= List of number-one singles in Switzerland =

This is a list of number-one hits in Switzerland by year from the Swiss Music Charts compiled every week.

== 1960s ==
- 1968
- 1969

== 1970s ==
- 1970
- 1971
- 1972
- 1973
- 1974
- 1975
- 1976
- 1977
- 1978
- 1979

== 1980s ==
- 1980
- 1981
- 1982
- 1983
- 1984
- 1985
- 1986
- 1987
- 1988
- 1989

== 1990s ==
- 1990
- 1991
- 1992
- 1993
- 1994
- 1995
- 1996
- 1997
- 1998
- 1999

== 2000s ==
- 2000
- 2001
- 2002
- 2003
- 2004
- 2005
- 2006
- 2007
- 2008
- 2009

== 2010s ==
- 2010
- 2011
- 2012
- 2013
- 2014
- 2015
- 2016
- 2017
- 2018
- 2019

== 2020s ==
- 2020
- 2021
- 2022
- 2023
- 2024
- 2025
- 2026
