= Gurtenfestival =

Music festival in Bern, Switzerland

- Genre: Rock, pop, hip hop
- Dates: July
- Location: Bern, Switzerland
- Coordinates: 46°57′N 7°27′E
- Years active: 1977–present
- Website: Official site

Gurtenfestival is an annual musical festival in Bern, Switzerland.

== 1991–2012 ==
=== 1995 ===
(14–16 July): Ben Harper, Incognito, Jeff Buckley, Public Enemy, Robben Ford, The Cranberries, The Cure, The Mission, Zap Mama, Zucchero, Stiltskin

=== 1996 ===
(19–21 July): Björk, Clawfinger, Coolio, Die Fantastischen Vier, Die Toten Hosen, Fettes Brot, Galliano, House of Pain, Iggy Pop, Jimmy Cliff, Jovanotti, Keziah Jones, Massive Attack, Nick Cave with Kylie Minogue & PJ Harvey, Skunk Anansie

=== 1997 ===
(18–20 July): Apocalyptica, Articolo 31, Bürger Lars Dietrich & Stefan Raab, David Byrne, De La Soul, Element Of Crime, Erasure, Faithless, Fun Lovin' Criminals, Isaac Hayes, Ismael Lo, Neneh Cherry, Noir Désir, Run DMC, Shaggy, Simple Minds, Spin Doctors, Taj Mahal, Youssou N'Dour

=== 1998 ===
(17–19 July): Asian Dub Foundation, Bobby Byrd, Chumbawamba, Herbert Grönemeyer, Jestofunk, Moby, Portishead, Rammstein, Sinéad O'Connor, The Corrs, Therapy?, Tito & Tarantula, Tito Puente & Arturo Sandoval

=== 1999 ===
(16–18 July): Alliance Ethnik, Björn Again, Bloodhound Gang, Die Fantastischen Vier, Everlast, Faithless, Gölä, Jonny Lang, Keziah Jones, Lovebugs, Patent Ochsner, Skunk Anansie, Subzonic, Tricky, UB40, Züri West

=== 2000 ===
(14–16 July): All Saints, Alpha Blondy, Angélique Kidjo, Ani DiFranco, Asian Dub Foundation, Guano Apes, HIM, Iggy Pop, Laurent Garnier, Lunik, Maceo Parker, Moby, Moloko, Orishas, Pet Shop Boys, Tower of Power, The Wailers

=== 2001 ===
(13–15 July): Die Ärzte, Die Happy, Eagle-Eye Cherry, Erykah Badu, Fun Lovin' Criminals, Incognito, Khaled, Kool & The Gang, Manu Chao, Morcheeba, Motörhead, Pink Martini, PJ Harvey, Saint Germain, Ska-P, The Young Gods, Thomas D

=== 2002 ===
(19–21 July): Air, Bauchklang, Bebel Gilberto, Beverley Knight, Chaka Khan, Die Toten Hosen, Favez, Gentleman, Gotan Project, Jarabe de Palo, Jovanotti, Lamb, Oasis, Patent Ochsner, Seeed, Sister Sledge, Ska-P, Skaladdin, Stiller Has, The Charlatans, Züri West

=== 2003 ===
(18–20 July): Alanis Morissette, Anouk, Asian Dub Foundation, Danko Jones, Skin, Die Fantastischen Vier, Earth, Wind & Fire Experience, Elvis Spectacular, Farin Urlaub Racing Team, Jimmy Cliff, Lovebugs, Massive Attack, Moloko, Open Season, Orishas, Röyksopp, Saybia, Starsailor, Stress & Band, The Skatalites, Tricky

=== 2004 ===
(15–18 July): 2Raumwohnung, Cameo, Danko Jones, Die Ärzte, Die Happy, IAM, Julian Marley, Kosheen, Lunik, Mando Diao, Spearhead, Millencolin, Monster Magnet, Myslovitz, Nena, Nguru, Ozomatli, Panteón Rococó, Placebo, Plüsch, Seeed, Ska-P, Sportfreunde Stiller, Stephan Eicher, The Streets, Vive La Fête, Wir sind Helden, Züri West

=== 2005 ===
(14–17 July): Adam Green, Athlete, Baze & Guests, Beatsteaks, Desorden Publico, Dizzee Rascal, Farin Urlaub Racing Team, Frank Popp Ensemble, Gentleman & the Far East Band, Jovanotti, Juli, Karamelo Santo, Louie Vega and his Elements of Live, Lovebugs, Mando Diao, Mich Gerber, Miss Kittin, Open Season, Patent Ochsner, Patrice, Roots Manuva, Sektion Kuchikäschtli, Silbermond, Söhne Mannheims, Stress, Sum 41, Texas, The Brand New Heavies, The Chemical Brothers, The Hives, The Prodigy, The Soundtrack of Our Lives, US3, Within Temptation

=== 2006 ===
(13–16 July): Bela B., Billy Idol, Breitbild, Coldcut, Culcha Candela, Danko Jones, David Gray, Skin, Editors, Fettes Brot, Flogging Molly, Gogol Bordello, James Blunt, Jamie Cullum, Joy Denalane, Kaizers Orchestra, Laurent Garnier & Bugge Wesseltoft, Manu Chao, Mattafix, Mousse T. & Band, Phoenix, Reamonn, Sportfreunde Stiller, Stiller Has, The Sounds, We Are Scientists, William White, Wir sind Helden, Wurzel 5, Xavier Naidoo

=== 2007 ===
(19–22 July): 2raumwohnung, 6er Gascho, Avril Lavigne, Babylon Circus, Backslash, Baschi, Basement Jaxx, Baze feat. Secondo, Beatsteaks, Bligg, The BossHoss, Brothertunes, Christina Stürmer, Clawfinger, Cypress Hill, Danko Jones, The Delilahs, Die Fantastischen Vier, Dieter Thomas Kuhn, Dizzee Rascal, Donavon Frankenreiter, Fiji, Freundeskreis, Gaugehill, Gimma, Gustav, Hillbilly Moon Explosion, Joss Stone, Kelis, Kosheen, The Locos, Lunik, Magicrays, Maury, My Name Is George, Nada Surf, Ojos de Brujo, Pegasus, Peter Bjorn and John, The Pipettes, Plüsch, The Roots, Scissor Sisters, Seven, Shantel, Stress, Sunrise Avenue, Swiss Jazz Orchestra, Tomazobi, The Young Gods, Weyermann

The French hip hop band IAM was also scheduled to come, but a few days before the event one of the crew members became ill and so IAM did not make it.

=== 2008 ===
(17–20 July): Amy Macdonald, Ben Harper, Culcha Candela, Disco Ensemble, Herbert Grönemeyer, HIM, Ich und Ich, John Butler Trio, Kaiser Chiefs, Miss Platinum, N.E.R.D., Paolo Nutini, Solomon Burke, The Bosshoss, The Chemical Brothers, William White, Zappa Plays Zappa, Züri West

=== 2009 ===
(16–19 July): Bloc Party, Blue King Brown, Dropkick Murphys, Eluveitie, Franz Ferdinand, Glasvegas, Juliette Lewis, Kings of Leon, Moonraisers, Oasis, Patent Ochsner, Pendulum, Peter Fox, Phenomden, Razorlight, Röyksopp, Seven, Silbermond, Ska-P, Sorgente, Stress, The Gaslight Anthem, Travis, Tricky, White Lies

The Saturday Night headline performance of Oasis was the last concert of the British band in Switzerland before their breakup in August 2009.

=== 2010 ===
(15–18 July): Amy Macdonald, An Horse, Archive, Babyshambles, Bad Religion, Band of Skulls, Biffy Clyro, Blood Red Shoes, Charlie Winston, Chocquibtown, Editors, Empire of the Sun, Faith No More, Florence and the Machine, Gogol Bordello, Gossip, Groove Armada, Jet, John Butler Trio, Lunik, Milow, Open Season, Rodrigo y Gabriela, Sens Unik, Skunk Anansie, Steff la Cheffe, Stereophonics, The Kooks, The Parlotones

=== 2011 ===
(14–17 July): 2ManyDJs, 77 Bombay Street, Aloe Blacc, Arctic Monkeys, Beady Eye, Beatsteaks, Bloody Beetroots Death Crew 77, Brandon Flowers, Christophe Maé, Eels, Glasvegas, Jamie Cullum, Jamiroquai, Kaiser Chiefs, Kasabian, Kate Nash, Kummerbuben, Pendulum, Royal Republic, Sophie Hunger, The National, The Script, The Streets, The Ting Tings, The Vaccines, Underworld

=== 2012 ===
(12–15 July): Birdy Nam Nam, Bonaparte, Boy, Casper, Dick Brave & The Backbeats, Digitalism, Dry The River, Edward Sharpe and the Magnetic Zeros, Example, Frank Turner & The Sleeping Souls, Friendly Fires, Fritz Kalkbrenner, Gorillaz Sound System, Jan Delay, Kraftklub, Leningrad Cowboys, Lenny Kravitz, Nneka, Noel Gallagher's High Flying Birds, Norah Jones, Other Lives, Parov Stelar Band, Patent Ochsner, Phenomden, The Roots, Santigold, Snow Patrol, Stress, The Subways, Thees Uhlmann, Xavier Rudd, Yodelice, Züri West lo & leduc

== Gallery ==
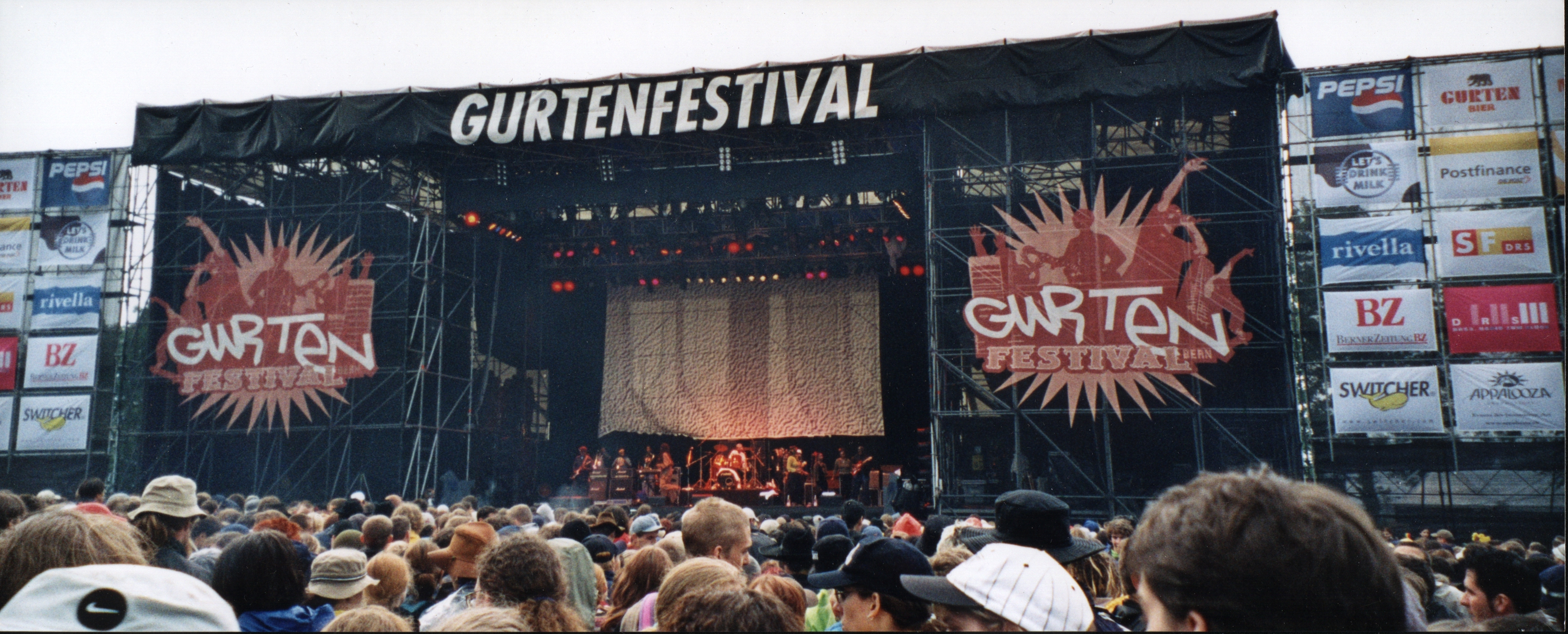
Gurtenfestival 2000

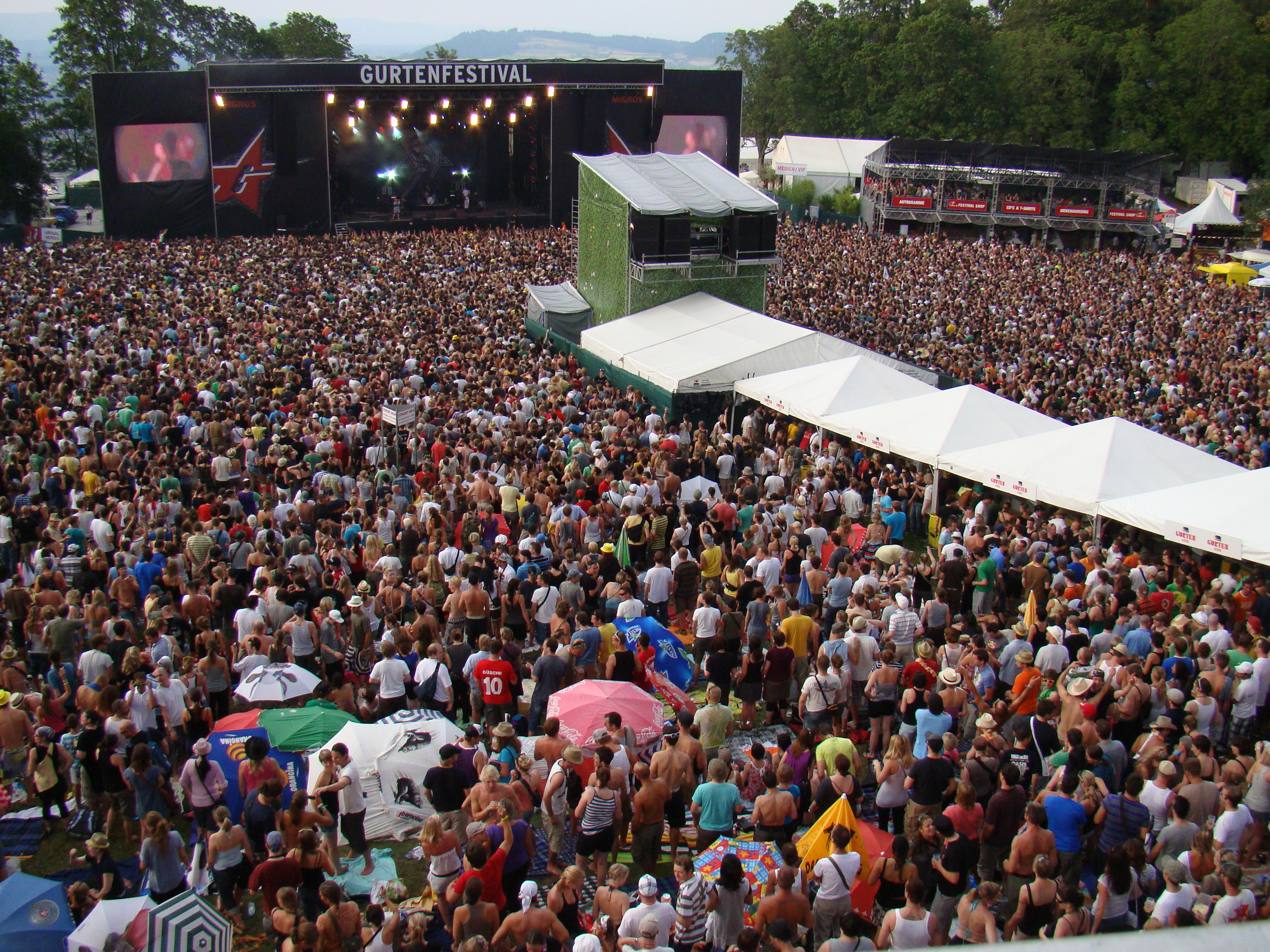
Gossip playing at the Gurtenfestival in 2010
