= Breiter als der Türsteher =

Studio album by Majoe
- Released: 5 September 2014
- Genres: German hip hop, gangsta rap
- Label: Banger Musik

Majoe chronology
Breiter als der Türsteher (2014)	Breiter als 2 Türsteher (2015)

Breiter als der Türsteher (B.A.D.T.) is the first solo album by German rapper Majoe. It was released on 5 September 2014 and includes 22 tracks on its premium edition.

== Track listing ==
No.	Title	Producer(s)	Length
1.	"Nur der Tod kann mich stoppen"	Majoe
2.	"Stählende Faust"	Majoe
3.	"Prototyp Banger"	Majoe
4.	"Wenn wir kommen"	Majoe
5.	"Stresserblick"	Majoe & Kurdo
6.	"Badt"	Majoe feat. Farid Bang & Kollegah
7.	"Badt" (skit)	Majoe
8.	"Zanhpastalächeln"	Majoe
9.	"Ghettosuperstar"	Majoe
10.	"Bastard - Majoe & Jasko"	Majoe & Jasko
11.	"Musterschwiegersohn"	Majoe
12.	"Gladiator"	Majoe
13.	"Legende"	Majoe
14.	"Hantelbank"	Majoe
15.	"Immer für dich da"	Majoe
16.	"Muskulöse Übernahme"	Majoe & Kollegah
17.	"Schwester aus Gold"	Majoe
18.	"Manchmal"	Majoe feat. KC Rebell & Summer Cem
19.	"Hidden Track"	Muyo & Tino

== Singles and freetracks ==
Year	Title	Peak positions			Note
Year	Title	GER	AT	SUI	Note
2014	"Wat is' denn los mit dir"	39	—	—	First published: 25 April 2014 (with Kollegah) (download-single)
2014	"Nur der Tod kann mich stoppen" Breiter als der Türsteher	78	67	—	First published: 4 July 2014
2014	"Ghettosuperstar"; Breiter als der Türsteher	86	—	—	First published: 18 July 2014
2014	"BADT"; Breiter als der Türsteher	55	70	—	First published: 22 August 2014 (featuring Farid Bang & Kollegah)
2014	"Manchmal"; Breiter als der Türsteher	76	—	—	First published: 5 September 2014 (featuring KC Rebell & Summer Cem)
2014	"Stresserblick"; Breiter als der Türsteher	92	—	—	First published: 5 September 2014 (featuring Kurdo)
