= Seraina Telli =

Swiss singer and songwriter (born 1990)

- Telli in 2019

Background information
- Born: 17 April 1990 (age 36); Untersiggenthal, Aargau, Switzerland
- Genres: Rock; hard rock; heavy metal; progressive rock
- Occupations: Singer; songwriter
- Years active: 2010–present
- Labels: Nuclear Blast; Napalm Records; Rockstar Publishing; Metalville Records
- Member of: Dead Venus
- Formerly of: Rizon; Surrilium; Burning Witches

Seraina Telli (born 17 April 1990) is a Swiss singer, songwriter and multi-instrumentalist in the rock, hard rock, heavy metal and progressive rock genres. She was the female vocalist of Rizon from 2010 to 2014, and the lead vocalist of Surrillum (2011–2017) and Burning Witches (2015–2019). Since her departure from Burning Witches in 2019, she has been focusing on her band Dead Venus and her solo career.

== Biography ==
With a penchant for rock and heavy metal music, Telli developed a great interest in music in her childhood. After she studied music at the University of Freiburg in Germany, she began her career as a singer and songwriter.

In 2015, Telli was hired as the frontwoman of the heavy/power metal band Burning Witches and went on European tours with the band. During her time with Burning Witches, she was a songwriter and lyricist on the first two studio albums. In 2019, Telli left Burning Witches to focus on her band, Dead Venus, as well as her solo project. In October 2022, Telli released her debut solo album "Simple Talk" and it reached number 2 on the Swiss charts. In September 2023, she released her second album "Addicted to Color", which reached number 1 on the Swiss charts.

== Musical style ==
Telli is well known for her versatility as a musician and for using various genres.

== Discography ==
=== Studio albums ===
==== Solo ====
List of studio albums, with selected details
| Title | Details | Peak chart positions | |
| Title | Details | SWI | GER Rock |
|---|---|---|---|
| Simple Talk | Released: 30 October 2022; Label: Metalville Records | 2 | — |
| Addicted to Color | Released: 3 September 2023; Label: Metalville Records | 1 | — |
| Green | Released: 24 October 2025; Label: Metalville Records | 1 | 19 |
"—" denotes a recording that did not chart or was not released in that territory.

==== Dead Venus ====
List of studio albums, with selected details
| Title | Details | Peak chart positions SWI |
|---|---|---|
| Bird of Paradise | Released: 13 September 2019; Label: Self-released | — |
| Flowers & Pain | Released: 13 February 2022; Label: Rockstar Publishing | 86 |
