= Majoe =

German rapper

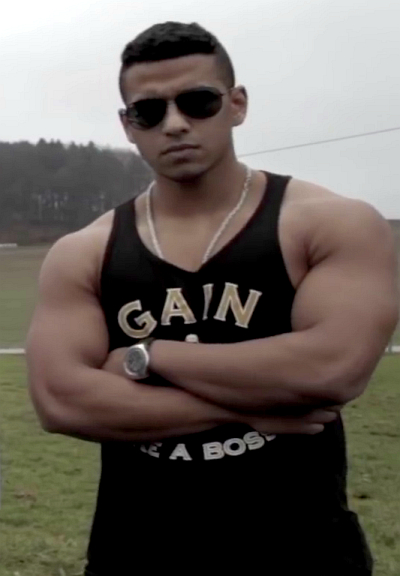
Majoe in 2014

Majyuran Ragunathan (Tamil: மயூரன் ரகுநாதன், born 21 April 1989), better known by his stage name Majoe, is a German rapper of Sri Lankan Tamil descent. He is signed by the Farid Bang-owned label Banger Music Records since 2012.

== Career ==
Majoe was born in Duisburg, Germany, the son of Tamil immigrants. His family fled from the Sri Lankan Civil War to Germany. At the age of 16, Majoe began to rap with his companion the German rapper Jasko. Together they rapped as the duo Majoe & Jasko. The two boys released one extended play titled Übernahme EP. The mixtape attracted so much attention that the German rapper Farid Bang took them under contract. Majoe obtained extended fame when he recorded freetracks with German rapper Kollegah.

On 5 September Majoe released his first solo album Breiter als der Türsteher (B.A.D.T.) that includes 22 tracks on the premium edition.

== Discography ==
=== Albums ===
Year	Title	Chart position			Note
Year	Title	GER	AUT	SWI	Note
2014	Breiter als der Türsteher	1	3	1	
2015	Breiter als 2 Türsteher	1	2	3	
2017	Auge des Tigers	1	3	2	
2018	Frontal	15	34	25	

=== Collaboration albums ===
Year	Title	Chart position			Note
Year	Title	GER	AUT	SWI	Note
2017	Blanco (with Kurdo)	6	7	7	

=== Singles ===
Year	Title	Chart position			Album
Year	Title	GER	AUT	SWI	Album
2014	"Wat is' denn los mit dir" (with Kollegah) (Download single)	39	—	—	
2014	"Nur der Tod kann mich stoppen"	78	67	—	Breiter als der Türsteher
2014	"Ghettosuperstar"	86	—	—	Breiter als der Türsteher
2014	"BADT" (featuring Farid Bang & Kollegah)	55	70	—	Breiter als der Türsteher
2014	"Manchmal" (featuring KC Rebell & Summer Cem)	76	—	—	Breiter als der Türsteher
2014	"Stresserblick" (featuring Kurdo)	92	—	—	Breiter als der Türsteher
2017	"Sidechick"	97	—	—	Auge des Tigers
2017	"Banger Imperium" (featuring Farid Bang, KC Rebell, Jasko, Summer Cem, 18 Karat & Play69)	82	—	—	Auge des Tigers
2017	"Silberner Ferrari" (featuring Farid Bang)	83	—	—	Auge des Tigers
2017	"Narben" (featuring MoTrip)	96	—	—	Auge des Tigers
2017	"Desert Eagle" (with Kurdo)	68	—	99	Blanco
2018	"Ewigkeit"	75	—	—	
2019	"Chellam"	85	—	80	

=== With Jasko ===
Albums

- 2012: Mobbing Musik
- 2013: Majoe vs. Jasko

EP

- 2011: Übernahme EP (Fatbeatz)
- 2012: Übernahme EP (Banger Musik Edition)
