= Cobra Spell =

Dutch heavy metal band

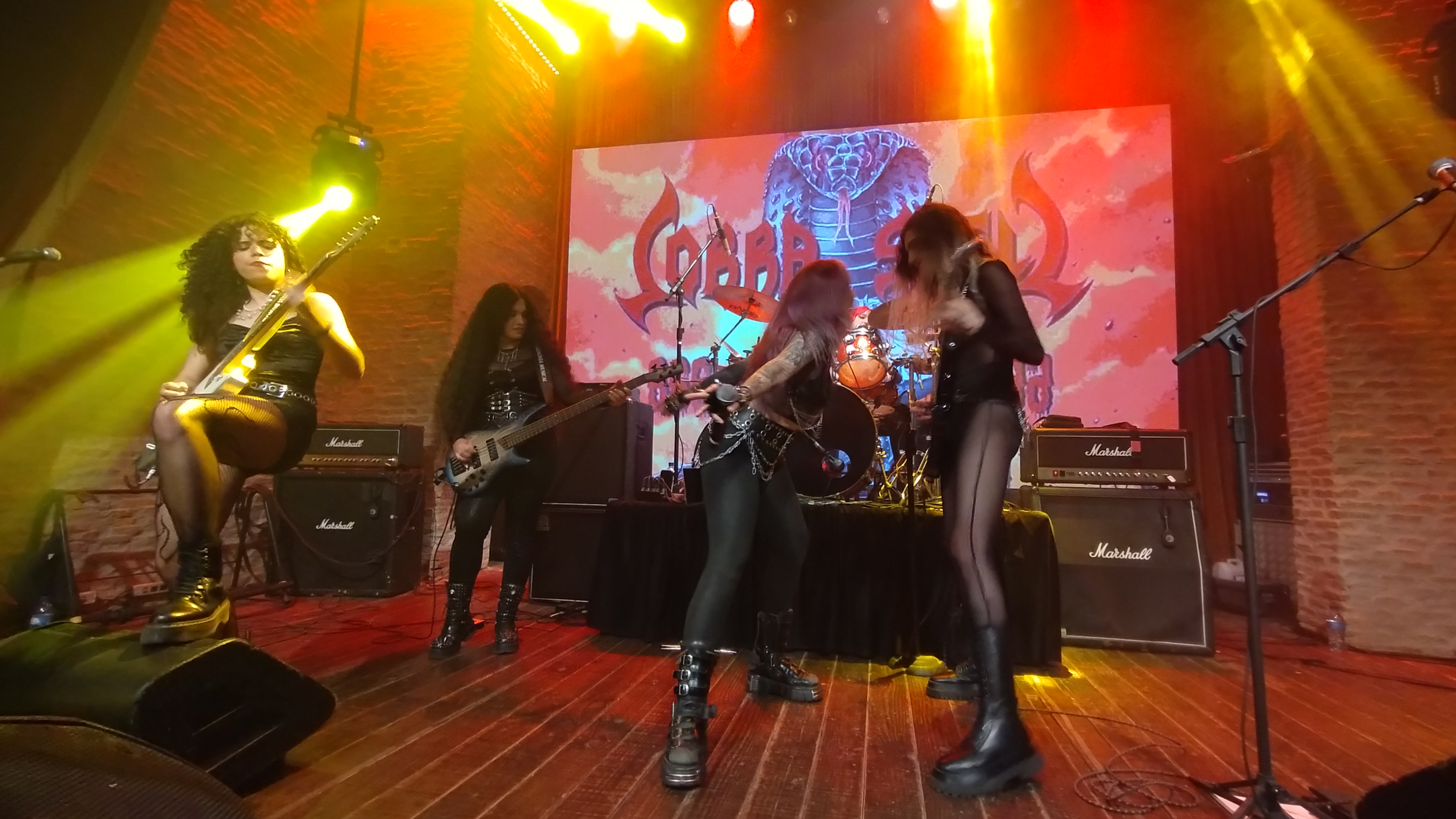
- Cobra Spell in Goiânia, Brazil

Background information
- Origin: Tilburg, Netherlands
- Genres: Heavy metal; hard rock
- Years active: 2019–2026 (Note: Hiatus)
- Label: Napalm Records
- Members: Sonia "Anubis" Nusselder; Kris Vega; Adri Funêrailles
- Past members: See below
- Website: www.cobraspell.com

Cobra Spell was a Dutch heavy metal band formed in Tilburg in 2019 by Sonia Anubis. Cobra Spell began with both male and female members in their ranks, then evolved into an all-female band, until in 2025, Adri Funêrailles joined as guitarist. The band is currently signed to Napalm Records.

== History ==
The band was formed in 2019 in Tilburg by guitarist Sonia Anubis, who previously played with the Swiss heavy metal band Burning Witches and spent two years with the Brazilian band Crypta. The new band would have an 1980s sleaze metal style and full creative freedom. The name "Cobra Spell" has no special meaning, and was selected simply because Anubis thought it was cool.

The other initial members came from several other indie bands, although none of them played the genre of Cobra Spell. They were the guitarist Sebastian Silva (Idle Hands, Silver Talon, Spellcaster), singer Alexx Panza (Hitten, Jack Starr’s Burning Starr), drummer Léonard Cakolli (Sharx, Adam Bomb), and bassist Anjelina Vehera. In the midst of the COVID-19 pandemic, Cobra Spell released their first EP, Love Venom, with the songs "Come on tonight", "Poison bite", "Love venom", and "Shake me".

The band had several line-up changes at that point, including the vocalist Panza. As the band was selected for a European tour with Ross the Boss and Dark Embrace, replacing the band Asomvel, they added the singer Kristina Vega, from the Spanish band Born in Exile. She sent a recording for her hearing an hour after talking with Anubis, and learned the full set within a week. She was confirmed as the new regular singer shortly afterwards. The lyrics of the songs, written from a male POV, were switched to a female one after the change.

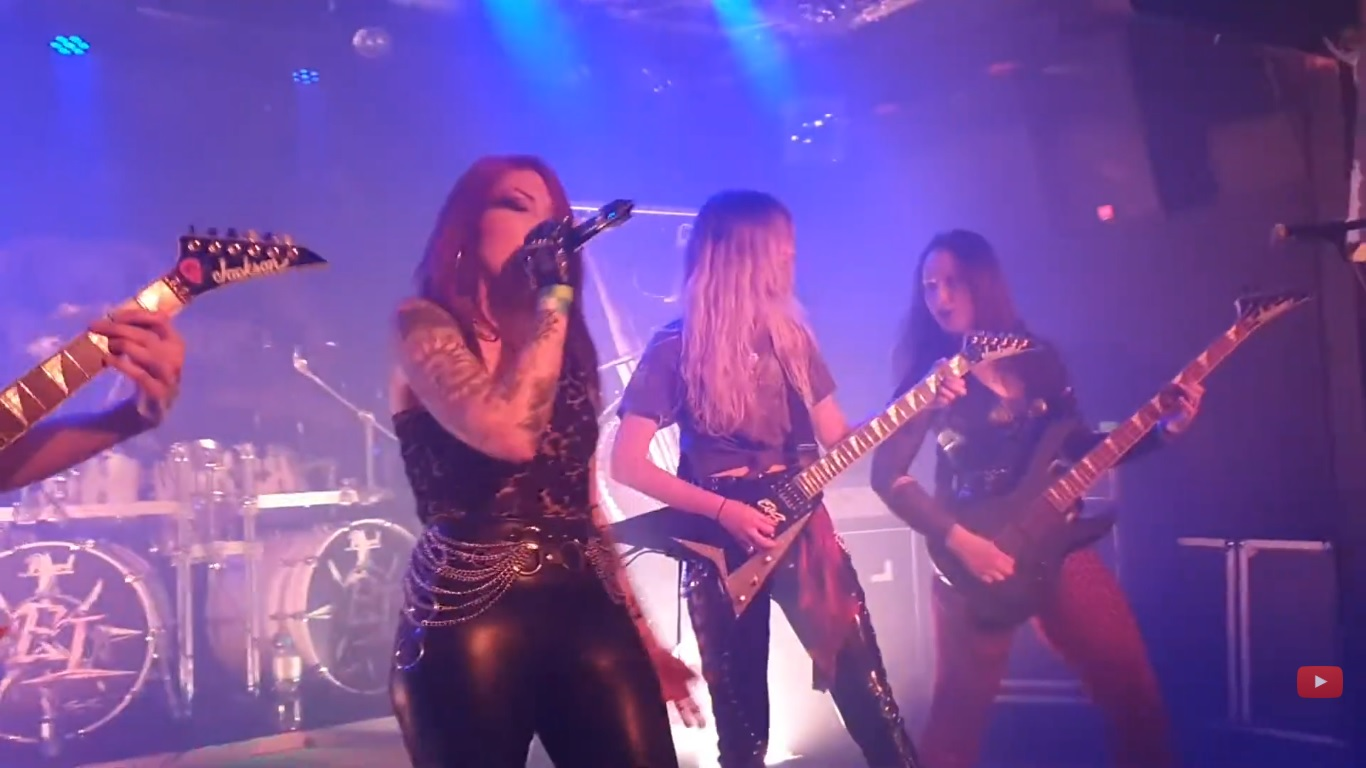
Cobra Spell performing in 2022

In March 2022, the band released their second EP Anthems of the Night, recorded in Madrid, after which Anubis left Crypta the following month to focus on Cobra Spell. The EP was financed by the fans of the band, which was an independent act at the time. The video "Addicted to the night" got half a million views on YouTube in two months. Later in December, the band signed an international distribution contract with the Austrian record label Napalm Records, and shortly afterward, they released their first studio album 666 in 2023, which was noticed by the specialist press. Cobra Spell released the single S.E.X. the same year. It was followed by the singles "The devil inside of me" and "Warriors from hell", and a European tour. The concerts at Lyon and Nuremberg were completely sold out.

In March 2025, the band released their third EP entitled Anthems of the Venomous Hearts. It was followed by a European tour, including the United Kingdom for the first time.

On February 17, 2026, the group announced via social media that they were going on an indefinite hiatus, citing that "the core and backbone of the project needs to pause".

== Band members ==
=== Last line-up ===
- Sonia "Anubis" Nusselder – guitar (2019–2026)
- Kris Vega – vocals (2022–2026)
- Adri Funérailles – guitar (2025–2026)

=== Former ===
- Sebastian "Spyder" Silva – guitar (2019–2020)
- Alexx Panza – vocals (2019–2022)
- Esmée van Sinderen – guitar (2020–2022)
- Angelina Vehera – bass (2020–2023)
- Mike "Lucas" Verhof – drums (2020)
- Léonard Cakolli – drums (2020–2023)
- Pineapple Jess – drums (2022–2023)
- Noelle dos Anjos – guitar (2022–2024)
- Roxana Herrera – bass (2023–2024)
- Hale Naphtha – drums (2023–2025)

=== Touring ===
- Raja Meissner – drums (2022)
- Anna Voloshyna – guitar (2022)
- Jara Solis – bass (2023)
- Bel Mena – bass (2025)
- Richie "Love" López – bass (2025)
- Eric Killer – drums (2025)

== Discography ==
Studio albums:

- 666 (2023)

EPs:

- Love Venom (2020)
- Anthems of the Night (2022)
- Anthems of the Venomous Hearts (2025)

Singles:

- "Come on Tonight" (2020)
- "Poison Bite" (2020)
- "Love Venom" (2020)
- "Shake Me" (2020)
- "Flaming Heart" (2022)
- "Addicted to the Night" (2022)
- "S.E.X." (2023)
- "The Devil Inside of Me" (2023)
- "Warrior from Hell" (2023)
- "Love Crime" (2024)
