= List of number-one hits of 2023 (Switzerland) =

This is a list of the Swiss Hitparade number-one hits of 2023.

== Swiss charts ==
Issue date	Song	Artist	Album	Artist
1 January	"All I Want for Christmas Is You"	Mariah Carey	Christmas	Michael Bublé
8 January	"I'm Good (Blue)"	David Guetta and Bebe Rexha	Paul	Sido
15 January	"I'm Good (Blue)"	David Guetta and Bebe Rexha	Every Loser	Iggy Pop
22 January	"Flowers"	Miley Cyrus	Dankbarkeit	Schwyzerörgeliquartett Genderbüebu
29 January	"Flowers"	Miley Cyrus	Rush!	Måneskin
5 February	"Flowers"	Miley Cyrus	Dankbarkeit	Schwyzerörgeliquartett Genderbüebu
12 February	"Flowers"	Miley Cyrus	Dankbarkeit	Schwyzerörgeliquartett Genderbüebu
19 February	"Flowers"	Miley Cyrus	Foregone	In Flames
26 February	"Flowers"	Miley Cyrus	Trustfall	Pink
5 March	"Flowers"	Miley Cyrus	Irgendöppis isch immer	Ritschi
12 March	"Flowers"	Miley Cyrus	Enfoirés un jour, toujours	Les Enfoirés
19 March	"Flowers"	Miley Cyrus	Endless Summer Vacation	Miley Cyrus
26 March	"Flowers"	Miley Cyrus	Songs of Surrender	U2
2 April	"Flowers"	Miley Cyrus	Memento Mori	Depeche Mode
9 April	"All Night"	RAF Camora featuring Luciano	Schön hämmer gredet	Mc Hero
16 April	"Flowers"	Miley Cyrus	Hope	NF
23 April	"Flowers"	Miley Cyrus	72 Seasons	Metallica
30 April	"Daylight"	David Kushner	72 Seasons	Metallica
7 May	"Flowers"	Miley Cyrus	High & Hungrig 3	Bonez MC and Gzuz
14 May	"Daylight"	David Kushner	−	Ed Sheeran
21 May	"Tattoo"	Loreen	−	Ed Sheeran
28 May	"Tattoo"	Loreen	Rockerherz	Megawatt
4 June	"Flowers"	Miley Cyrus	Love Songs	Peter Fox
11 June	"Sprinter"	Dave and Central Cee	But Here We Are	Foo Fighters
18 June	"Sprinter"	Dave and Central Cee	Invincible	Shakra
25 June	"Sprinter"	Dave and Central Cee	U.F.O.	Gölä
2 July	"Sprinter"	Dave and Central Cee	XV	RAF Camora
9 July	"Sprinter"	Dave and Central Cee	Balance	Beatrice Egli
16 July	"Malli"	Dardan and Azet	Speak Now	Taylor Swift
23 July	"Sprinter"	Dave and Central Cee	Speak Now	Taylor Swift
30 July	"Sprinter"	Dave and Central Cee	The Ballad of Darren	Blur
6 August	"Fe!n"	Travis Scott featuring Playboi Carti	Utopia	Travis Scott
13 August	"What Was I Made For?"	Billie Eilish	Meitli tanz!	Ländlertrio Rusch-Büeblä
20 August	"Sprinter"	Dave and Central Cee	Utopia	Travis Scott
27 August	"Sprinter"	Dave and Central Cee	Freud am Läbe	Heimweh
3 September	"Paint the Town Red"	Doja Cat	Addicted to Color	Seraina Telli
10 September	"Paint the Town Red"	Doja Cat	2bis	Florent Pagny
17 September	"Paint the Town Red"	Doja Cat	ADC	Freeze Corleone
24 September	"Paint the Town Red"	Doja Cat	Wenn s Läbe drzwüsche chunt	Baschi
1 October	"Paint the Town Red"	Doja Cat	Schwarzes Herz	Ayliva
8 October	"Si No Estás"	Iñigo Quintero	12	Schwiizergoofe
15 October	"Si No Estás"	Iñigo Quintero	Tradition	Bligg
22 October	"Si No Estás"	Iñigo Quintero	Nadie Sabe Lo Que Va a Pasar Mañana	Bad Bunny
29 October	"Si No Estás"	Iñigo Quintero	Hackney Diamonds	The Rolling Stones
5 November	"Si No Estás"	Iñigo Quintero	1989	Taylor Swift
12 November	"Si No Estás"	Iñigo Quintero	Proviant	Kunz
19 November	"Si No Estás"	Iñigo Quintero	MTV Unplugged	Stress
26 November	"Si No Estás"	Iñigo Quintero	X2VR	Sfera Ebbasta
3 December	"All I Want for Christmas Is You"	Mariah Carey	Wiehnacht wie's früener isch gsi	Jessica Ming and René Bisang
10 December	"All I Want for Christmas Is You"	Mariah Carey	Abentüür Pischteschreck	Schwiizergoofe
17 December	"All I Want for Christmas Is You"	Mariah Carey	Loch dür Zyt	Züri West
24 December	"All I Want for Christmas Is You"	Mariah Carey	Loch dür Zyt	Züri West
31 December	"All I Want for Christmas Is You"	Mariah Carey	Loch dür Zyt	Züri West
