= Echoes of the Soul =

Studio album by Crypta
- Released: 11 June 2021
- Recorded: January 2021
- Studio: Family Mob Studio, São Paulo, Brazil
- Genre: Death metal
- Length: 41:46
- Label: Napalm
- Producer: Thiago Vakka

Crypta chronology
Echoes of the Soul (2021)	Shades of Sorrow (2023)

Singles from Echoes of the Soul
- 1. "From the Ashes" Released: 7 April 2021; 2. "Starvation" Released: 11 May 2021; 3. "Dark Night of the Soul" Released: 8 June 2021

Professional ratings
Review scores
Source	Rating
Distorted Sound Magazine	9/10
Blabbermouth.net	8.5/10

Echoes of the Soul is the debut studio album by Brazilian death metal band Crypta. It was recorded throughout January 2021 at the Family Mob Studio in São Paulo, Brazil, mastered at Fascination Street Studios in Örebro, Sweden, and released on 11 June 2021 through Napalm Records. To date, it is the only Crypta album to feature Dutch guitarist Sonia "Anubis" Nusselder. The songs "From the Ashes", "Starvation" and "Dark Night of the Soul" were released as singles.

== Track listing ==
All tracks are written by Bergamaschi, Dametto, Nusselder and Lira.

Echoes of the Soul track listing
No.	Title	Length
1.	"Awakening"	0:56
2.	"Starvation"	4:16
3.	"Possessed"	3:46
4.	"Death Arcana"	4:44
5.	"Shadow Within"	4:48
6.	"Under the Black Wings"	3:42
7.	"Kali"	4:33
8.	"Blood Stained Heritage"	4:37
9.	"Dark Night of the Soul"	5:13
10.	"From the Ashes"	5:11
Total length:		41:46

== Personnel ==
=== Band members ===
- Fernanda Lira – bass, vocals
- Luana Dametto – drums
- Tainá Bergamaschi – guitars
- Sonia "Anubis" Nusselder – guitars

=== Staff ===
- Thiago Vakka – production
- Otávio Rossato – engineering
- Arthur Rizk – mixing
- Jens Bogren – mastering
- Renan Faciolo – photography
- João Duarte – layout
- Wes Benscoter – cover art

== Charts ==
Chart performance for Echoes of the Soul
Chart (2021)	Peak position
German Albums (Offizielle Top 100)	55
Swiss Albums (Schweizer Hitparade)	34
