= Shades of Sorrow =

Studio album by Crypta
- Released: 4 August 2023
- Recorded: February 2023
- Studio: Family Mob Studio, São Paulo, Brazil
- Genre: Death metal
- Length: 51:45
- Label: Napalm
- Producer: Rafael Augusto Lopes; Leeo Hanna; Gabriel Bonilha

Crypta chronology
Echoes of the Soul (2021)	Shades of Sorrow (2023)

Singles from Shades of Sorrow
- 1. "Lord of Ruins" Released: 31 May 2023; 2. "Trial of Traitors" Released: 27 June 2023; 3. "The Other Side of Anger" Released: 1 August 2023

Professional ratings
Review scores
Source	Rating
Angry Metal Guy	Great!
Blabbermouth.net	8.5
Distorted Sound Magazine	9/10
Metal Injection	8.5
MetalSucks	4.5/5 stars

Shades of Sorrow is the second studio album by Brazilian death metal band Crypta. It was recorded throughout February 2023 at the Family Mob Studio in São Paulo, Brazil. It was later mixed at 33 Studios in Stockholm, Sweden, mastered at Fascination Street Studios in Örebro, Sweden, and released in August 2023 through Napalm. It is the only studio album to feature guitarist Jéssica di Falchi, who left on March 10, 2025. The songs "Lord of Ruins", "Trial of Traitors" and "The Other Side of Anger" were also released as singles.

It was chosen by the Associação Paulista de Críticos de Arte as one of the 50 best Brazilian albums of 2023.

== Track listing ==
All tracks are written by Bergamaschi, Dametto, di Falchi and Lira.

Shades of Sorrow track listing
No.	Title	Length
1.	"The Aftermath"	1:01
2.	"Dark Clouds"	4:46
3.	"Poisonous Apathy"	4:28
4.	"The Outsider"	5:29
5.	"Stronghold"	6:15
6.	"The Other Side of Anger"	4:23
7.	"The Limbo"	0:47
8.	"Trial of Traitors"	4:54
9.	"Lullaby for the Forsaken"	4:30
10.	"Agents of Chaos"	4:49
11.	"Lift the Blindfold"	4:29
12.	"Lord of Ruins"	5:14
13.	"The Closure"	0:40

== Personnel ==
=== Band members ===
- Fernanda Lira – bass, vocals
- Luana Dametto – drums
- Tainá Bergamaschi – guitars
- Jéssica di Falchi – guitars

=== Session musician ===
- Pablo Greg – keyboards

=== Staff ===
- Rafael Augusto Lopes – production, engineering
- Leeo Hanna – production
- Gabriel Bonilha – production
- Otávio Rossato – engineering
- Daniel Bergstrand – mixing
- Jens Bogren – mastering
- Pablo Greg – sound design
- João Duarte – layout
- Luana Dametto – layout
- Estevam Romera – photography
- Raul Campos – cover art

== Charts ==
Chart performance for Shades of Sorrow
Chart (2023)	Peak position
Austrian Albums (Ö3 Austria)	52
German Albums (Offizielle Top 100)	23
Swiss Albums (Schweizer Hitparade)	43
