= List of number-one hits of 2017 (Switzerland) =

This is a list of the Swiss Hitparade number ones of 2017.

== Swiss charts ==
Issue date	Song	Artist	Album	Artist
1 January	"Rockabye"	Clean Bandit featuring Sean Paul and Anne-Marie	Blue & Lonesome	The Rolling Stones
8 January	"Rockabye"	Clean Bandit featuring Sean Paul and Anne-Marie	Blue & Lonesome	The Rolling Stones
15 January	"Shape of You"	Ed Sheeran	Patina	Kaiser & Dimitri
22 January	"Shape of You"	Ed Sheeran	Silver	Gotthard
29 January	"Shape of You"	Ed Sheeran	Silver	Gotthard
5 February	"Shape of You"	Ed Sheeran	Big Rocks	Krokus
12 February	"Shape of You"	Ed Sheeran	No Hunger	Kunz
19 February	"Shape of You"	Ed Sheeran	Human	Rag'n'Bone Man
26 February	"Shape of You"	Ed Sheeran	Under Stars	Amy Macdonald
5 March	"Shape of You"	Ed Sheeran	Endosaurusrex	Stiller Has
12 March	"Shape of You"	Ed Sheeran	÷	Ed Sheeran
19 March	"Shape of You"	Ed Sheeran	÷	Ed Sheeran
26 March	"Shape of You"	Ed Sheeran	Spirit	Depeche Mode
2 April	"Shape of You"	Ed Sheeran	Love	Züri West
9 April	"Shape of You"	Ed Sheeran	Love	Züri West
16 April	"Shape of You"	Ed Sheeran	Infinite	Deep Purple
23 April	"Despacito"	Luis Fonsi featuring Daddy Yankee	Mele7	Zuna
30 April	"Despacito"	Luis Fonsi featuring Daddy Yankee	Jong & Hässig Reloaded	Mimiks
7 May	"Despacito"	Luis Fonsi featuring Daddy Yankee	Humanz	Gorillaz
14 May	"Despacito"	Luis Fonsi featuring Daddy Yankee	Laune der Natur	Die Toten Hosen
21 May	"Despacito"	Luis Fonsi featuring Daddy Yankee	Helene Fischer	Helene Fischer
28 May	"Despacito"	Luis Fonsi featuring Daddy Yankee	Helene Fischer	Helene Fischer
4 June	"Despacito"	Luis Fonsi featuring Daddy Yankee	Helene Fischer	Helene Fischer
11 June	"Despacito"	Luis Fonsi featuring Daddy Yankee	Is This the Life We Really Want?	Roger Waters
18 June	"Despacito"	Luis Fonsi featuring Daddy Yankee	Black Friday	Bushido
25 June	"Despacito"	Luis Fonsi featuring Daddy Yankee	Maximum	KC Rebell and Summer Cem
2 July	"Despacito"	Luis Fonsi featuring Daddy Yankee	Evolve	Imagine Dragons
9 July	"Despacito"	Luis Fonsi featuring Daddy Yankee	Epic	Fler and Jalil
16 July	"Despacito"	Luis Fonsi featuring Daddy Yankee	Aloha	Calimeros
23 July	"Despacito"	Luis Fonsi featuring Daddy Yankee	Sampler 4	187 Strassenbande
30 July	"Despacito"	Luis Fonsi featuring Daddy Yankee	One More Light	Linkin Park
6 August	"Despacito"	Luis Fonsi featuring Daddy Yankee	Zauberland	Die Amigos
13 August	"Despacito"	Luis Fonsi featuring Daddy Yankee	Land ob de Wolke	Jodlerklub Wiesenberg
20 August	"Despacito"	Luis Fonsi featuring Daddy Yankee	Land ob de Wolke	Jodlerklub Wiesenberg
27 August	"Despacito"	Luis Fonsi featuring Daddy Yankee	Land ob de Wolke	Jodlerklub Wiesenberg
3 September	"Despacito"	Luis Fonsi featuring Daddy Yankee	Villains	Queens of the Stone Age
10 September	"What About Us"	Pink	Land ob de Wolke	Jodlerklub Wiesenberg
17 September	"What About Us"	Pink	13	Indochine
24 September	"What About Us"	Pink	Concrete and Gold	Foo Fighters
1 October	"What About Us"	Pink	Le présent d'abord	Florent Pagny
8 October	"Dusk Till Dawn"	Zayn featuring Sia	Urchig	Gölä
15 October	"Dusk Till Dawn"	Zayn featuring Sia	Urchig	Gölä
22 October	"Dusk Till Dawn"	Zayn featuring Sia	Beautiful Trauma	Pink
29 October	"Perfect"	Ed Sheeran	Blueme	Heimweh
5 November	"Perfect"	Ed Sheeran	Slow Motion	Eliane
12 November	"Perfect"	Ed Sheeran	Blueme	Heimweh
19 November	"Perfect"	Ed Sheeran	Reputation	Taylor Swift
26 November	"Perfect"	Ed Sheeran	Blueme	Heimweh
3 December	"Perfect"	Ed Sheeran	Blueme	Heimweh
10 December	"Perfect"	Ed Sheeran	Jung brutal gutaussehend 3	Kollegah and Farid Bang
17 December	"Perfect"	Ed Sheeran	Song Book	Stephan Eicher and Martin Suter
24 December	"Perfect"	Ed Sheeran	Revival	Eminem
31 December	"Perfect"	Ed Sheeran	÷	Ed Sheeran

== Romandie charts ==
Issue date	Song	Artist	Album	Artist
1 January	"Human"	Rag'n'Bone Man	Blue & Lonesome	The Rolling Stones
8 January	"Human"	Rag'n'Bone Man	2 – Tout le bonheur du monde	Kids United
15 January	"Shape of You"	Ed Sheeran	2 – Tout le bonheur du monde	Kids United
22 January	"Shape of You"	Ed Sheeran	Silver	Gotthard
29 January	"Shape of You"	Ed Sheeran	Silver	Gotthard
5 February	"Shape of You"	Ed Sheeran	Silver	Gotthard
12 February	"Shape of You"	Ed Sheeran	Silver	Gotthard
19 February	"Shape of You"	Ed Sheeran	Human	Rag'n'Bone Man
26 February	"Shape of You"	Ed Sheeran	Human	Rag'n'Bone Man
5 March	"Shape of You"	Ed Sheeran	Human	Rag'n'Bone Man
12 March	"Shape of You"	Ed Sheeran	Mission Enfoirés	Les Enfoirés
19 March	"Shape of You"	Ed Sheeran	Mission Enfoirés	Les Enfoirés
26 March	"Shape of You"	Ed Sheeran	Spirit	Depeche Mode
2 April	"Shape of You"	Ed Sheeran	÷	Ed Sheeran
9 April	"Shape of You"	Ed Sheeran	Force & Honneur	Lacrim
16 April	"Shape of You"	Ed Sheeran	Infinite	Deep Purple
23 April	"Despacito"	Luis Fonsi featuring Daddy Yankee	Damn	Kendrick Lamar
30 April	"Despacito"	Luis Fonsi featuring Daddy Yankee	÷	Ed Sheeran
7 May	"Despacito"	Luis Fonsi featuring Daddy Yankee	Humanz	Gorillaz
14 May	"Despacito"	Luis Fonsi featuring Daddy Yankee	Deo favente	SCH
21 May	"Despacito"	Luis Fonsi featuring Daddy Yankee	Harry Styles	Harry Styles
28 May	"Despacito"	Luis Fonsi featuring Daddy Yankee	One More Light	Linkin Park
4 June	"Despacito"	Luis Fonsi featuring Daddy Yankee	El Dorado	Shakira
11 June	"Despacito"	Luis Fonsi featuring Daddy Yankee	Is This the Life We Really Want?	Roger Waters
18 June	"Despacito"	Luis Fonsi featuring Daddy Yankee	Truth Is a Beautiful Thing	London Grammar
25 June	"Despacito"	Luis Fonsi featuring Daddy Yankee	Feed the Machine	Nickelback
2 July	"Despacito"	Luis Fonsi featuring Daddy Yankee	La vraie vie	Bigflo & Oli
9 July	"Despacito"	Luis Fonsi featuring Daddy Yankee	La vraie vie	Bigflo & Oli
16 July	"Despacito"	Luis Fonsi featuring Daddy Yankee	4:44	Jay-Z
23 July	"Despacito"	Luis Fonsi featuring Daddy Yankee	Evolve	Imagine Dragons
30 July	"Despacito"	Luis Fonsi featuring Daddy Yankee	Lust for Life	Lana Del Rey
6 August	"Despacito"	Luis Fonsi featuring Daddy Yankee	Everything Now	Arcade Fire
13 August	"Despacito"	Luis Fonsi featuring Daddy Yankee	Kaleidoscope	Coldplay
20 August	"Despacito"	Luis Fonsi featuring Daddy Yankee	Kaleidoscope	Coldplay
27 August	"Despacito"	Luis Fonsi featuring Daddy Yankee	Forever United	Kids United
3 September	"Despacito"	Luis Fonsi featuring Daddy Yankee	Liberté chérie	Calogero
10 September	"Despacito"	Luis Fonsi featuring Daddy Yankee	Forever United	Kids United
17 September	"What About Us"	Pink	13	Indochine
24 September	"What About Us"	Pink	13	Indochine
1 October	"What About Us"	Pink	Le présent d'abord	Florent Pagny
8 October	"Never Give Up"	Frik n Chic	Le présent d'abord	Florent Pagny
15 October	"What About Us"	Pink	Le présent d'abord	Florent Pagny
22 October	"What About Us"	Pink	Beautiful Trauma	Pink
29 October	"What About Us"	Pink	La fête est finie	Orelsan
5 November	"Perfect"	Ed Sheeran	Le choix du fou	Michel Sardou
12 November	"Perfect"	Ed Sheeran	Géopoétique	MC Solaar
19 November	"Perfect"	Ed Sheeran	Louane	Louane
26 November	"Perfect"	Ed Sheeran	On a tous quelque chose de Johnny	Various artists
3 December	"Perfect"	Ed Sheeran	Louane	Louane
10 December	"Perfect"	Ed Sheeran	Songs of Experience	U2
17 December	"Je te promets"	Johnny Hallyday	On a tous quelque chose de Johnny	Various artists
24 December	"Perfect"	Ed Sheeran	Louane	Louane
31 December	"Perfect"	Ed Sheeran	Louane	Louane
