= List of number-one hits of 2015 (Switzerland) =

This is a list of the Swiss Hitparade number ones of 2015.

== Swiss charts ==
Issue date	Song	Artist	Album	Artist
4 January	"Take Me to Church"	Hozier	Rock or Bust	AC/DC
11 January	"Take Me to Church"	Hozier	Rock or Bust	AC/DC
18 January	"Take Me to Church"	Hozier	Rock or Bust	AC/DC
25 January	"Take Me to Church"	Hozier	The Pale Emperor	Marilyn Manson
1 February	"Take Me to Church"	Hozier	Almaz	Kurdo
8 February	"Take Me to Church"	Hozier	Niveau weshalb warum	Deichkind
15 February	"Love Me like You Do"	Ellie Goulding	Apochalüpt	Müslüm
22 February	"Love Me like You Do"	Ellie Goulding	Carlo Cokxxx Nutten 3	Bushido
1 March	"Love Me like You Do"	Ellie Goulding	Fifty Shades of Grey: Original Motion Picture Soundtrack	Various Artists
8 March	"Love Me like You Do"	Ellie Goulding	Zucker fürs Volk	Lo & Leduc
15 March	"Love Me like You Do"	Ellie Goulding	Rebel Heart	Madonna
22 March	"Cheerleader" (Felix Jaehn Remix)	OMI	Sur la route des Enfoirés	Les Enfoirés
29 March	"Cheerleader" (Felix Jaehn Remix)	OMI	Chaos and the Calm	James Bay
5 April	"Are You with Me"	Lost Frequencies	Asphalt Massaka 3	Farid Bang
12 April	"See You Again"	Wiz Khalifa featuring Charlie Puth	Furious 7: Original Motion Picture Soundtrack	Various Artists
19 April	"See You Again"	Wiz Khalifa featuring Charlie Puth	Furious 7: Original Motion Picture Soundtrack	Various Artists
26 April	"See You Again"	Wiz Khalifa featuring Charlie Puth	BackFunkLoveSoul	Seven
3 May	"See You Again"	Wiz Khalifa featuring Charlie Puth	Supermoon	Sophie Hunger
10 May	"See You Again"	Wiz Khalifa featuring Charlie Puth	Wieso immer mir?	Chlyklass
17 May	"See You Again"	Wiz Khalifa featuring Charlie Puth	Achter Tag	Genetikk
24 May	"Lean On"	Major Lazer & DJ Snake featuring MØ	Mountain Man	Andreas Gabalier
31 May	"Heroes"	Måns Zelmerlöw	Muttersprache	Sarah Connor
7 June	"Lean On"	Major Lazer & DJ Snake featuring MØ	How Big, How Blue, How Beautiful	Florence and the Machine
14 June	"Lean On"	Major Lazer & DJ Snake featuring MØ	Drones	Muse
21 June	"Lean On"	Major Lazer & DJ Snake featuring MØ	Fata Morgana	KC Rebell
28 June	"Goodbye"	Feder featuring Lyse	JGUDZS – Jung genug um drauf zu scheissen	Kay One
5 July	"Lean On"	Major Lazer & DJ Snake featuring MØ	Santiago Blue	Die Amigos
12 July	"Goodbye"	Feder featuring Lyse	MTV Unplugged	Cro
19 July	"El mismo sol"	Álvaro Soler	Hurra die Welt geht unter	K.I.Z
26 July	"El Perdón"	Nicky Jam & Enrique Iglesias	Sommersehnsucht	Calimeros
2 August	"El Perdón"	Nicky Jam & Enrique Iglesias	Sommersehnsucht	Calimeros
9 August	"El Perdón"	Nicky Jam & Enrique Iglesias	Water for Your Soul	Joss Stone
16 August	"Astronaut"	Sido featuring Andreas Bourani	7	Paul Kalkbrenner
23 August	"Astronaut"	Sido featuring Andreas Bourani	Venom	Bullet for My Valentine
30 August	"Astronaut"	Sido featuring Andreas Bourani	Compton	Dr. Dre
6 September	"El Perdón"	Nicky Jam & Enrique Iglesias	Zwüsche dir und mir	Baschi
13 September	"Astronaut"	Sido featuring Andreas Bourani	The Book of Souls	Iron Maiden
20 September	"Astronaut"	Sido featuring Andreas Bourani	VI	Sido
27 September	"Astronaut"	Sido featuring Andreas Bourani	Seven Mountains	77 Bombay Street
4 October	"Astronaut"	Sido featuring Andreas Bourani	Sugar	Robin Schulz
11 October	"Astronaut"	Sido featuring Andreas Bourani	Mundart Folk	Kunz
18 October	"Sugar"	Robin Schulz	Surrender	Hurts
25 October	"Astronaut"	Sido featuring Andreas Bourani	Get Up	Bryan Adams
1 November	"Hello"	Adele	100% Schweizer Musik	Polo Hofer & Friends
8 November	"Hello"	Adele	Ensemble	Kendji Girac
15 November	"Hello"	Adele	CLA$$IC	Bushido & Shindy
22 November	"Hello"	Adele	Purpose	Justin Bieber
29 November	"Hello"	Adele	25	Adele
6 December	"Hello"	Adele	25	Adele
13 December	"Hello"	Adele	25	Adele
20 December	"Hello"	Adele	25	Adele
27 December	"Hello"	Adele	25	Adele

== Romandie charts ==
Issue date	Song	Artist	Album	Artist
4 January	"Dangerous"	David Guetta featuring Sam Martin	Rock or Bust	AC/DC
11 January	"Take Me to Church"	Hozier	Rock or Bust	AC/DC
18 January	"Take Me to Church"	Hozier	Restriction	Archive
25 January	"Take Me to Church"	Hozier	The Pale Emperor	Marilyn Manson
1 February	"Uptown Funk"	Mark Ronson featuring Bruno Mars	Gold Shadow	Asaf Avidan
8 February	"Uptown Funk"	Mark Ronson featuring Bruno Mars	R. E. D.	M. Pokora
15 February	"Take Me to Church"	Hozier	Fifty Shades of Grey: Original Motion Picture Soundtrack	Various Artists
22 February	"Take Me to Church"	Hozier	Vieux frères – Partie 2	Fauve
1 March	"Take Me to Church"	Hozier	Fifty Shades of Grey: Original Motion Picture Soundtrack	Various Artists
8 March	"Love Me like You Do"	Ellie Goulding	Fifty Shades of Grey: Original Motion Picture Soundtrack	Various Artists
15 March	"Love Me like You Do"	Ellie Goulding	Rebel Heart	Madonna
22 March	"Are You with Me"	Lost Frequencies	Sur la route des Enfoirés	Les Enfoirés
29 March	"Are You with Me"	Lost Frequencies	Sur la route des Enfoirés	Les Enfoirés
5 April	"Are You with Me"	Lost Frequencies	Sur la route des Enfoirés	Les Enfoirés
12 April	"Are You with Me"	Lost Frequencies	Sur la route des Enfoirés	Les Enfoirés
19 April	"See You Again"	Wiz Khalifa featuring Charlie Puth	D.U.C	Booba
26 April	"See You Again"	Wiz Khalifa featuring Charlie Puth	Chambre 12	Louane
3 May	"See You Again"	Wiz Khalifa featuring Charlie Puth	In extremis	Francis Cabrel
10 May	"Lean On"	Major Lazer & DJ Snake featuring MØ	In extremis	Francis Cabrel
17 May	"Lean On"	Major Lazer & DJ Snake featuring MØ	In extremis	Francis Cabrel
24 May	"Lean On"	Major Lazer & DJ Snake featuring MØ	In extremis	Francis Cabrel
31 May	"Goodbye"	Feder featuring Lyse	In extremis	Francis Cabrel
7 June	"Goodbye"	Feder featuring Lyse	Currency of Man	Melody Gardot
14 June	"Goodbye"	Feder featuring Lyse	Drones	Muse
21 June	"Goodbye"	Feder featuring Lyse	Drones	Muse
28 June	"Goodbye"	Feder featuring Lyse	Drones	Muse
5 July	"Goodbye"	Feder featuring Lyse	No Place in Heaven	Mika
12 July	"Goodbye"	Feder featuring Lyse	Chambre 12	Louane
19 July	"Reality"	Lost Frequencies featuring Janieck Devy	Chambre 12	Louane
26 July	"El Perdón"	Nicky Jam & Enrique Iglesias	Chambre 12	Louane
2 August	"El Perdón"	Nicky Jam & Enrique Iglesias	Chambre 12	Louane
9 August	"El Perdón"	Nicky Jam & Enrique Iglesias	Chambre 12	Louane
16 August	"El Perdón"	Nicky Jam & Enrique Iglesias	Chambre 12	Louane
23 August	"El Perdón"	Nicky Jam & Enrique Iglesias	Chambre 12	Louane
30 August	"El Perdón"	Nicky Jam & Enrique Iglesias	Chambre 12	Louane
6 September	"El Perdón"	Nicky Jam & Enrique Iglesias	Mon cœur avait raison	Maître Gims
13 September	"El Perdón"	Nicky Jam & Enrique Iglesias	The Book of Souls	Iron Maiden
20 September	"El Perdón"	Nicky Jam & Enrique Iglesias	The Book of Souls	Iron Maiden
27 September	"El Perdón"	Nicky Jam & Enrique Iglesias	Rattle That Lock	David Gilmour
4 October	"El Perdón"	Nicky Jam & Enrique Iglesias	Rattle That Lock	David Gilmour
11 October	"El Perdón"	Nicky Jam & Enrique Iglesias	Rattle That Lock	David Gilmour
18 October	"El Perdón"	Nicky Jam & Enrique Iglesias	Lay Low	Lou Doillon
25 October	"El Perdón"	Nicky Jam & Enrique Iglesias	Electronica 1: The Time Machine	Jean Michel Jarre
1 November	"Hello"	Adele	Corsu - Mezu mezu	Various Artists
8 November	"Hello"	Adele	Ensemble	Kendji Girac
15 November	"Hello"	Adele	Interstellaires	Mylène Farmer
22 November	"Hello"	Adele	De l'amour	Johnny Hallyday
29 November	"Hello"	Adele	25	Adele
6 December	"Hello"	Adele	25	Adele
13 December	"Hello"	Adele	25	Adele
20 December	"Hello"	Adele	25	Adele
27 December	"Hello"	Adele	25	Adele
