= Burning Witches =

Swiss heavy metal band

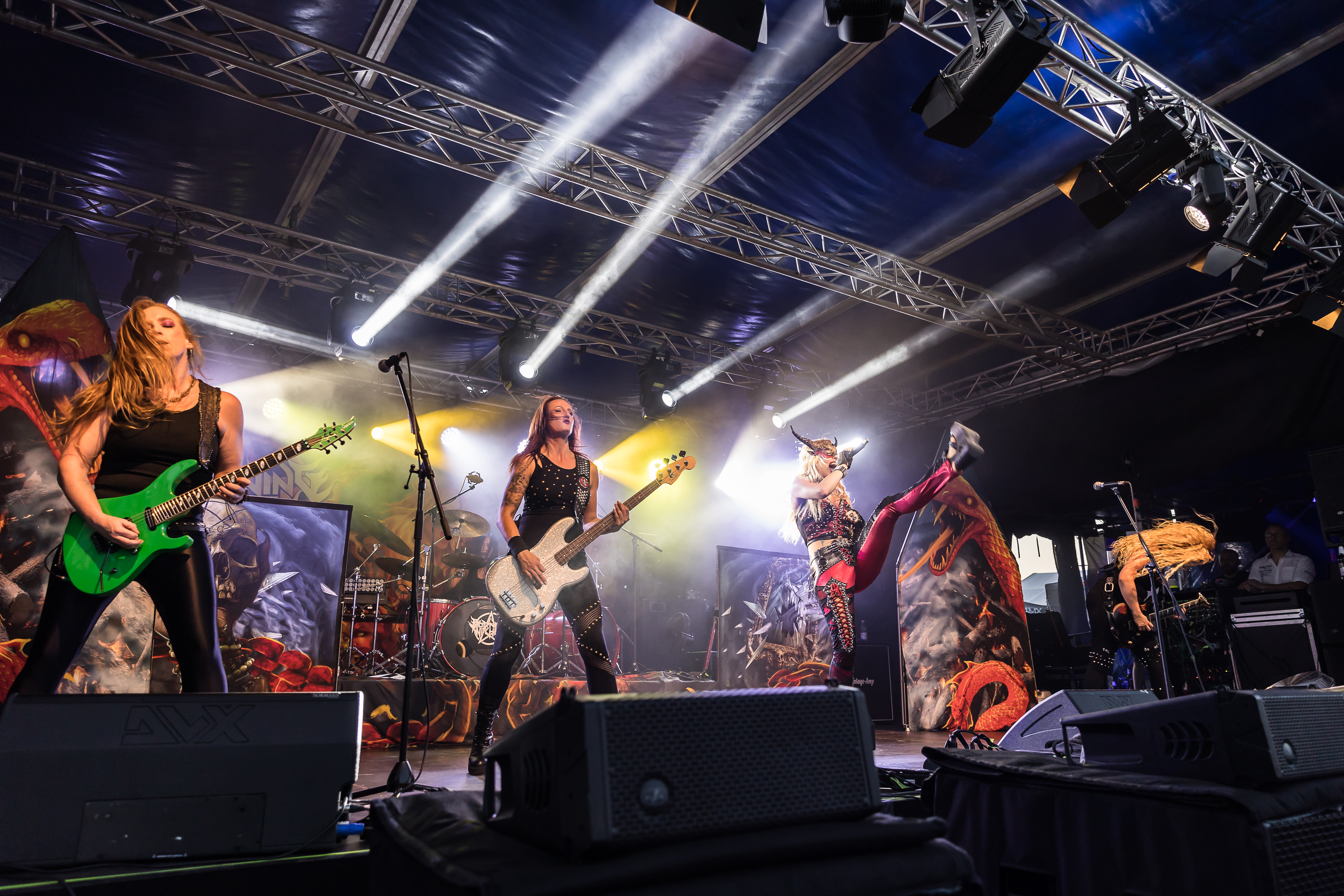
- Burning Witches in 2026

Background information
- Origin: Brugg, Aargau, Switzerland
- Genres: Heavy metal; power metal
- Years active: 2015–present
- Labels: Non Stop Music Records; Nuclear Blast; Napalm Records
- Members: Romana Kalkuhl; Jeanine Grob; Lala Frischknecht; Courtney Cox
- Past members: Seraina Telli; Alea Wyss; Sonia Nusselder; Larissa Ernst; Laura Guldemond
- Website: Official website

Burning Witches is a Swiss heavy metal band, founded by rhythm guitarist Romana Kalkuhl, based in Brugg, Aargau.

== History ==
=== Formation and self-titled debut ===
Romana Kalkuhl, guitarist with Atlas & Axis, had been looking for a cast for an all-female metal band for a long time. Over the years, she got to know different musicians and finally found the first cast with bassist Jeanine Grob, drummer Lala Frischknecht and lead singer Seraina Telli. In 2016, guitarist Alea Wyss completed the lineup. First came a self-titled single, which was also the band's first demo. This was voted "Demo of the Month" in both Rock Hard and Metal Hammer.

In 2017, Burning Witches released their self-titled debut album in-house, directed by V.O. Pulver (Poltergeist, Gurd) and Marcel "Schmier" Schirmer (Destruction). The album was distributed through the crowdfunding platform Pledge Music. With the song Jawbreaker, the album contains a cover version of a song by Judas Priest. The album reached number 73 in the Swiss album charts. Shortly after the release, Burning Witches began songwriting for their next album. On 14 February 2018, Nuclear Blast announced they had signed the band.

=== Hexenhammer and Dance with the Devil ===
In the meantime, Wyss was replaced by Sonia 'Anubis' Nusselder from the Netherlands. A tour as the opening act for Grave Digger followed. A first album trailer was released on 12 September 2018. Three digital singles followed. The album Hexenhammer was released on 9 November 2018. It is not a concept album in the strict sense, although the book of the same name plays a role in some songs. With Holy Diver by the band Dio there is again a cover version on the album. The album reached number 43 in the German album charts and number 21 in Switzerland. In June 2019, singer Seraina Telli left the band to focus on her own band, Dead Venus. She was succeeded by Dutch singer Laura Guldemond from the band Shadowrise.

In the Summer of 2019, Burning Witches played at the Wacken, Summer Breeze and Rockharz Open Air festivals. The album Dance with the Devil, produced by Pulver and Schirmer, was released on 6 March 2020. The album features a cover version of the Manowar song Battle Hymn, which features guest musicians Ross the Boss and Michael Lepond. Dance with the Devil entered the German and Swiss album charts at number 22 and 14 respectively. A few months later, Nusselder left the band after founding the death metal band Crypta with former Nervosa musicians Fernanda Lira and Luana Dametto. Larissa Ernst then took over as lead guitarist.

=== The Witch of the North ===
On 4 December, the band released The Circle of Five EP before recording their fourth studio album, The Witch of the North. The album was again produced by Schirmer and mixed and mastered by V.O. Powder. The album was released on 28 May 2021. The album entered the German and Swiss album charts at number 16 and 6 respectively. In February 2022, the band signed a new record deal with the Austrian record label Napalm Records. Their first tour of the United States with The Iron Maidens occurred in 2022.

== Musical style ==
Burning Witches is mainly influenced by the heavy metal of the 1980s, while the musicians also listen to other music. Among other things, Sonia 'Anubis' Nusselder also played in the death metal band Sephiroth. Nusselder is currently the lead guitarist of the band Cobra Spell. Musically, the band is reminiscent of Iron Maiden, Alice Cooper and Judas Priest.

== Band members ==
Burning Witches, current lineup live at Rock & Metal Day'z 2026, Oschersleben

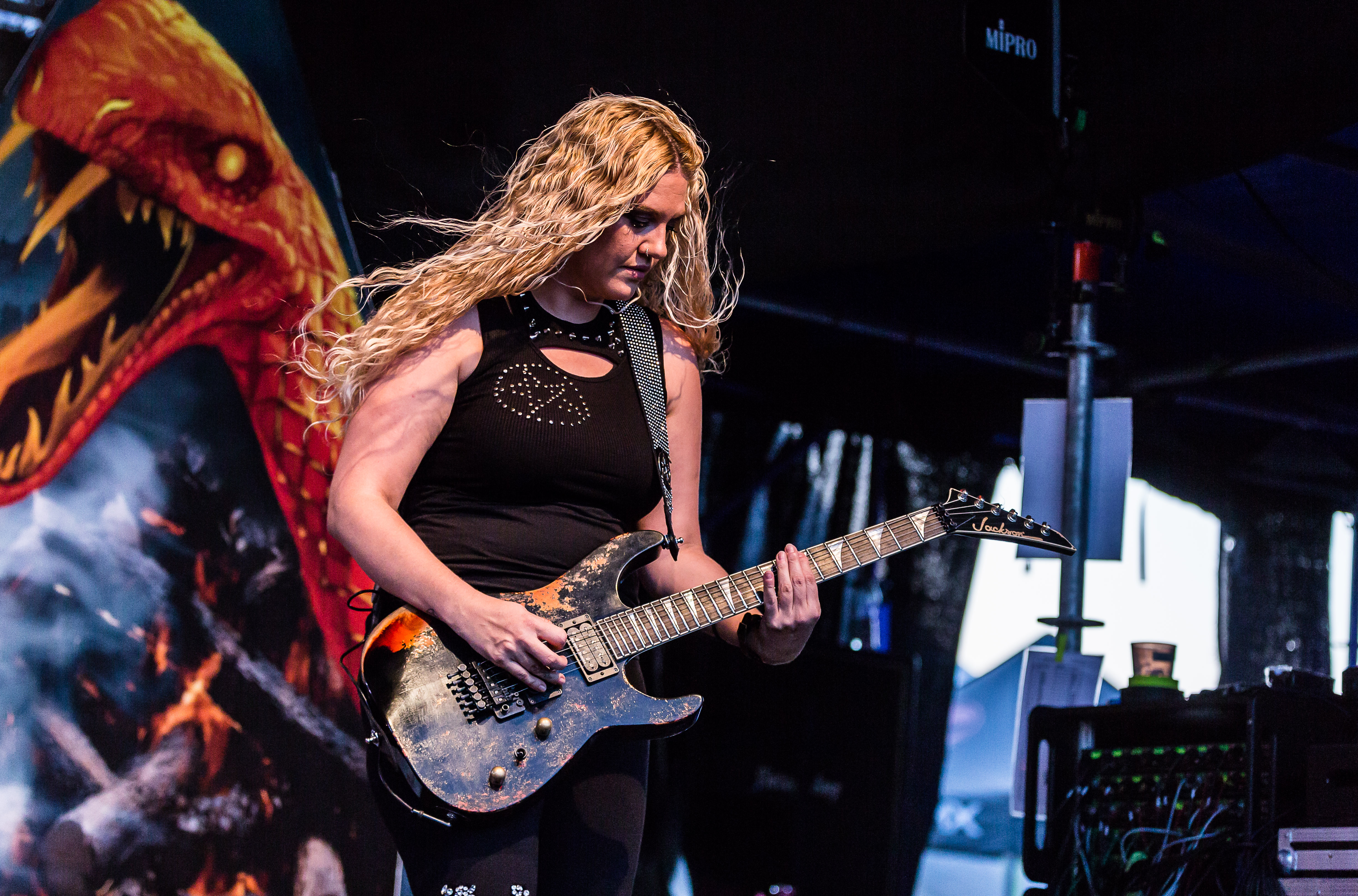
Romana Kalkuhl

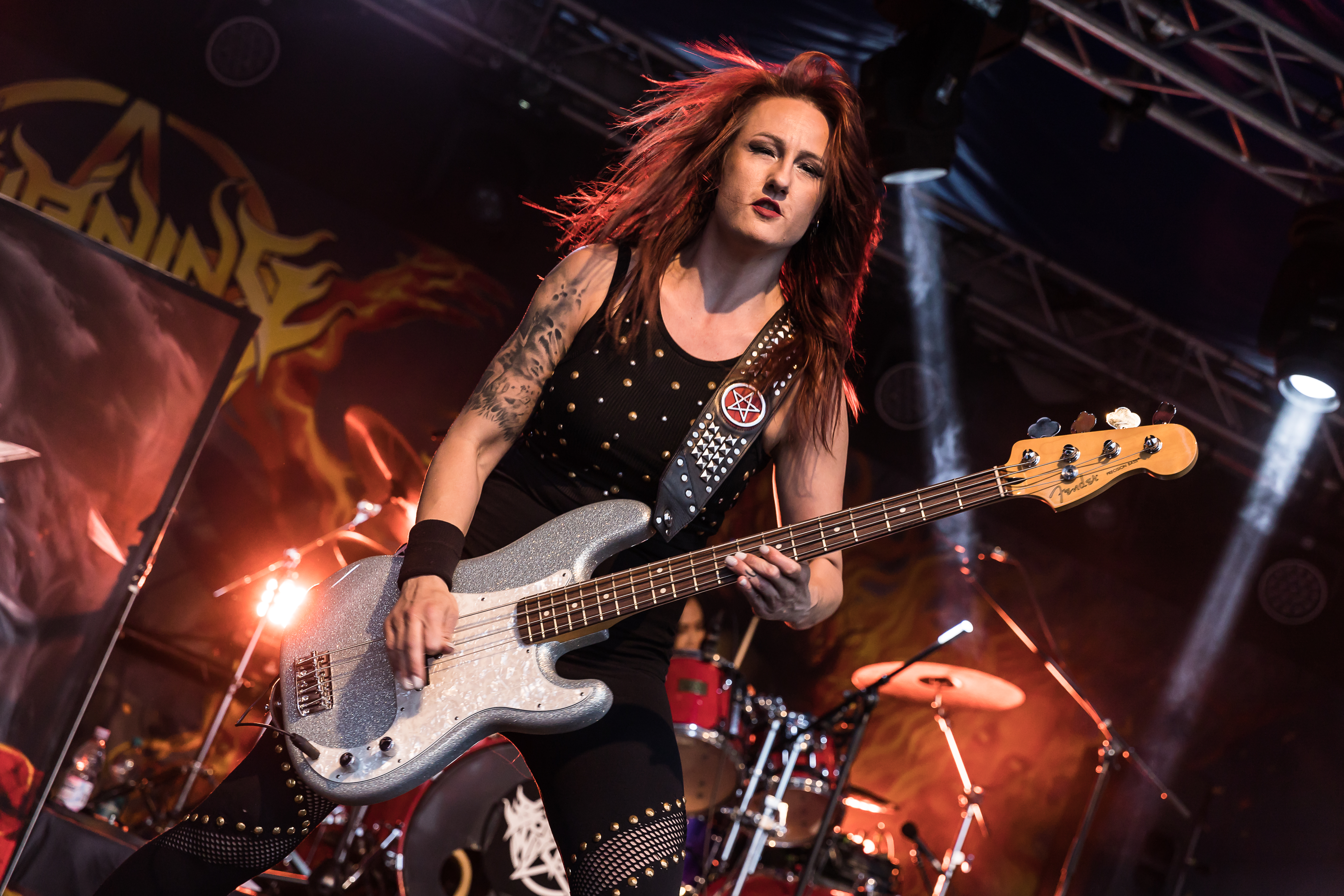
Jeanine Grob

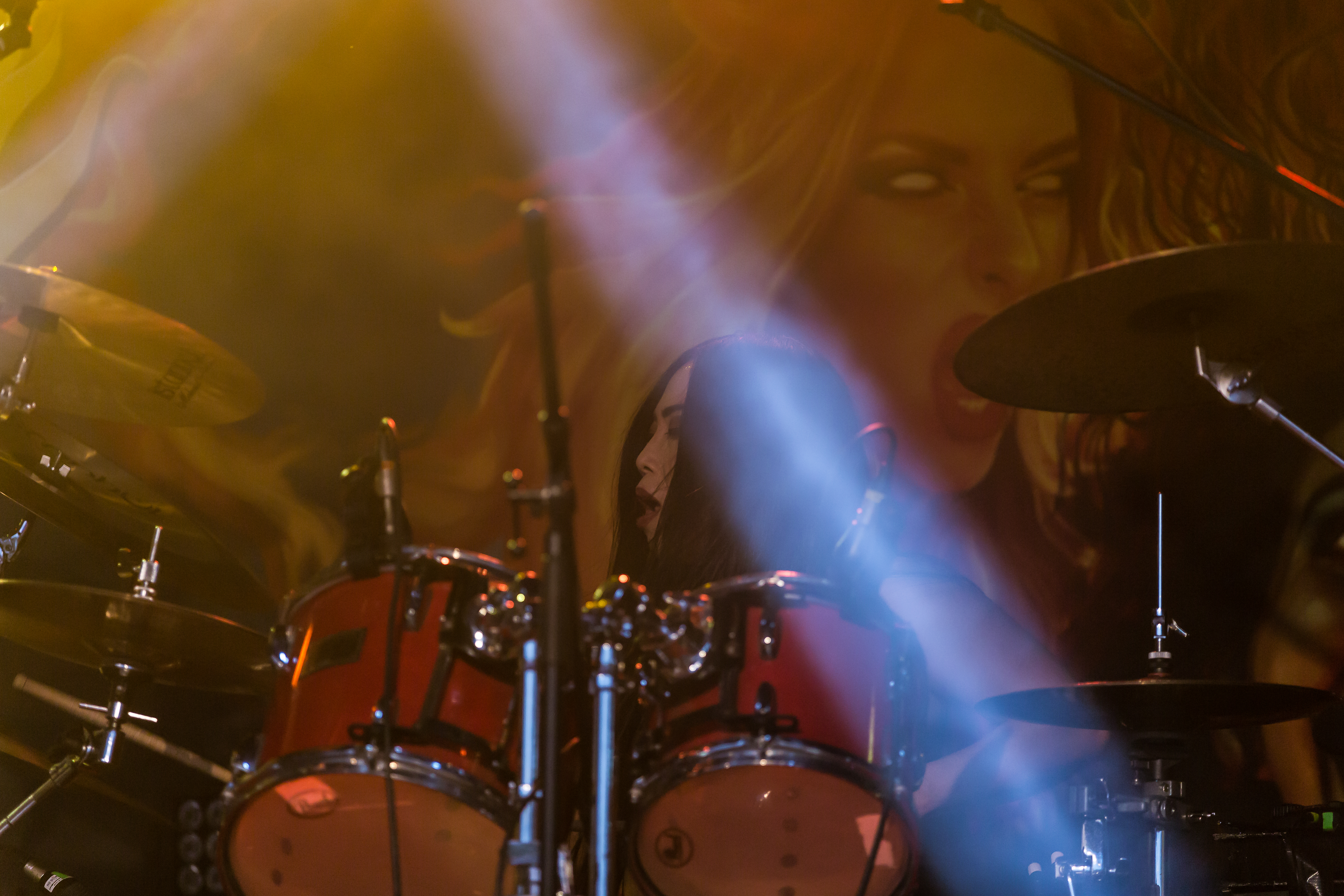
Lala Frischknecht

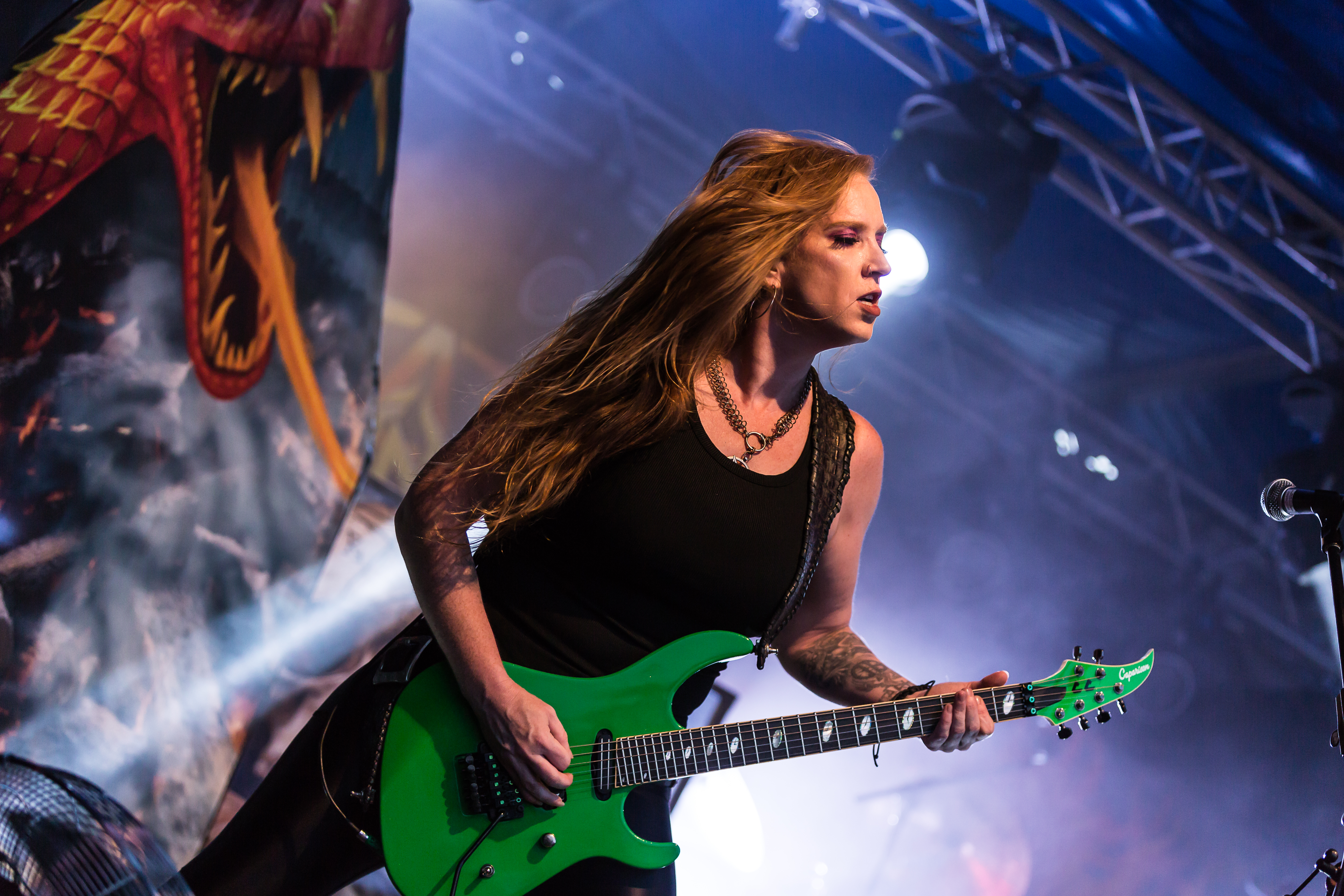
Courtney Cox

=== Current ===
- Romana Kalkuhl – rhythm guitar, backing vocals (2015–present)
- Jeanine Grob – bass (2015–present)
- Lala Frischknecht – drums, backing vocals (2015–present)
- Courtney Cox – lead guitar, backing vocals (2023–present)

=== Touring ===
- Simone Van Straten – guitar (2025)

=== Former ===
- Seraina Telli – lead vocals (2015–2019)
- Alea Wyss – lead guitar (2015–2018)
- Sonia Nusselder – lead guitar (2018–2020)
- Larissa Ernst – lead guitar (2020–2023)
- Laura Guldemond – lead vocals (2019–2026)

== Discography ==
=== Studio albums ===
Title	Album details	Peak chart positions	
Title	Album details	SWI	GER
Burning Witches	Release: 26 May 2017; Label: Non Stop Music Records	73	—
Hexenhammer	Release: 9 November 2018; Label: Nuclear Blast	21	43
Dance with the Devil	Release: 6 March 2020; Label: Nuclear Blast	14	22
The Witch of the North	Released: 28 May 2021; Label: Nuclear Blast	6	16
The Dark Tower	Release: 5 May 2023; Label: Napalm Records	3	20
Inquisition	Release: 22 August 2025; Label: Napalm Records	7	26

=== EPs ===
- 2018: Burning Alive (Live-EP, Self-produced)
- 2019: Wings of Steel (12"-EP, Nuclear Blast)
- 2020: The Circle of Five (EP, Nuclear Blast)

=== Singles ===
- 2016: Burning Witches (Demo 2016, Self-produced)
- 2018: Hexenhammer (Nuclear Blast)
- 2018: Executed (Nuclear Blast)
- 2018: Open Your Mind (Nuclear Blast)
- 2019: Wings of Steel (Nuclear Blast)
- 2020: Sea of Lies (Nuclear Blast)
- 2020: Dance with the Devil (Nuclear Blast)
- 2021: Flight of the Valkyries (Nuclear Blast)
- 2023: The Dark Tower (Napalm Records)
- 2023: Unleash the Beast (Napalm Records)
- 2023: World on Fire (Napalm Records)
- 2024: The Spell of the Skull (Napalm Records)
- 2025: High Priestess of the Night (Napalm Records)
- 2025: Soul Eater (Napalm Records)
