= Kunz (singer) =

Swiss singer

Marco Kunz
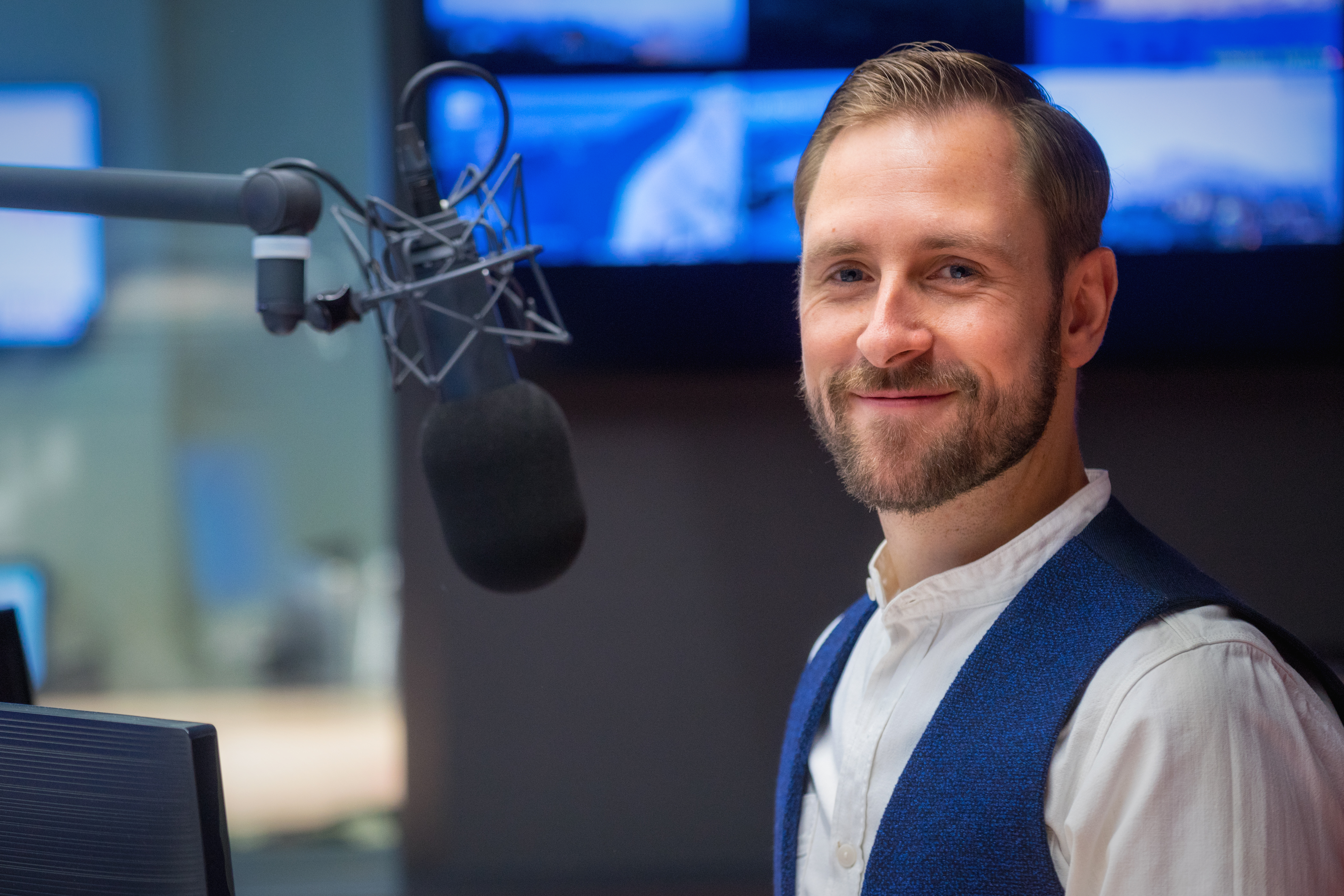
- Kunz in 2019
- Born: 14 August 1985 (age 41); Mauensee
- Other name: Kunz
- Occupation: Singer
- Years active: 2006-
- Website: https://www.kunzmusik.ch/

Marco Kunz (born 14 August 1985 in Mauensee), better known as simply Kunz, is a Swiss singer from Lucerne.

== Biography ==
Marco Kunz was born in Mauensee, Switzerland into a musical family. His father was a yodeller, and the family commonly sang together. He discovered his personal passion for music after secretly practicing on his sister's guitar. His first musical award was winning the junior yodel prize at 10 years old. He then became a member of the Surseer youth choir, and also performed in a rock band. In 2006, he became a member of the Swiss a cappella group a-live, who performed internationally. From 2007, he was the conductor of b-live choir in Küsnacht, then became the musical director of a-live. In 2010, he made solo appearances with his own music and left a-live in 2012 after signing a contract with Universal. Also in 2012, he recorded a mini album Chopf, Härz, Hand with six songs. In December 2012, he won the young talent award for best singer at the Small Prix Walo.

In May 2014, Kunz released his first full album Eifach so. It entered the Swiss Hitparade at number 21, and continued to stay in the top 100 for over a year. It reached a high of number 13, following an appearance by Kunz at a Bern radio station, Energy Air. This also helped Lüüt so wie mer to 3rd place in the single charts. Eifach so was then awarded a gold record for 10,000 units sold.

His second album, Mundart Folk (also how Kunz describes his genre), was released in 2015. It entered the charts at number one, and spent almost a year in the charts. In spring 2016, he received Newcomer of the Year 2015 at the Prix Walo. He also contributed the song Chliini Händ to the film Schellen-Ursli. In 2017, his third album No Hunger was released, and it reached number one in the Swiss charts.

In 2021, he took part in the second season of Sing meinen Song – Das Schweizer Tauschkonzert, a Swiss remake of the German reality show Sing meinen Song – Das Tauschkonzert.

In March 2021, Kunz released his fifth album, Mai.

== Discography ==
=== Albums ===
- Eifach so (2014)
- Mundart Folk (2015)
- No Hunger (2017)
- Förschi (2019)
- Mai (2021)
- Weisch no (Live Unplugged) (2023)

=== EPs ===
- Chopf, Härz, Hand (2012)

=== Singles ===
- Lüüt so wie mer (2014)
- Olten (2015)
- Chliini Händ (2015)
- Schlof nome ii (Live) 2017
- L.I.E.B.I (2018)
- S Gröschte (2019)
- Üses Lied (2019)
- Möuchstross (2020)
- mitenand (2022)
- Us de Region (2022)
- Sing Sing (2023)

== Awards and nominations ==
=== Awards ===
- 2015: Prix Walo - Category: "Newcomer"
- 2017: Prix Walo - Category: "Pop / Rock"

=== Nominations ===
- 2018: Swiss Music Awards - Category: "Best Male Solo Act"
- 2020: Swiss Music Awards - Category: "Best Male Solo Act"
- 2020: Swiss Music Awards - Category: "Best Album" (for Förschi)
