= Crypta =

Brazilian death metal band

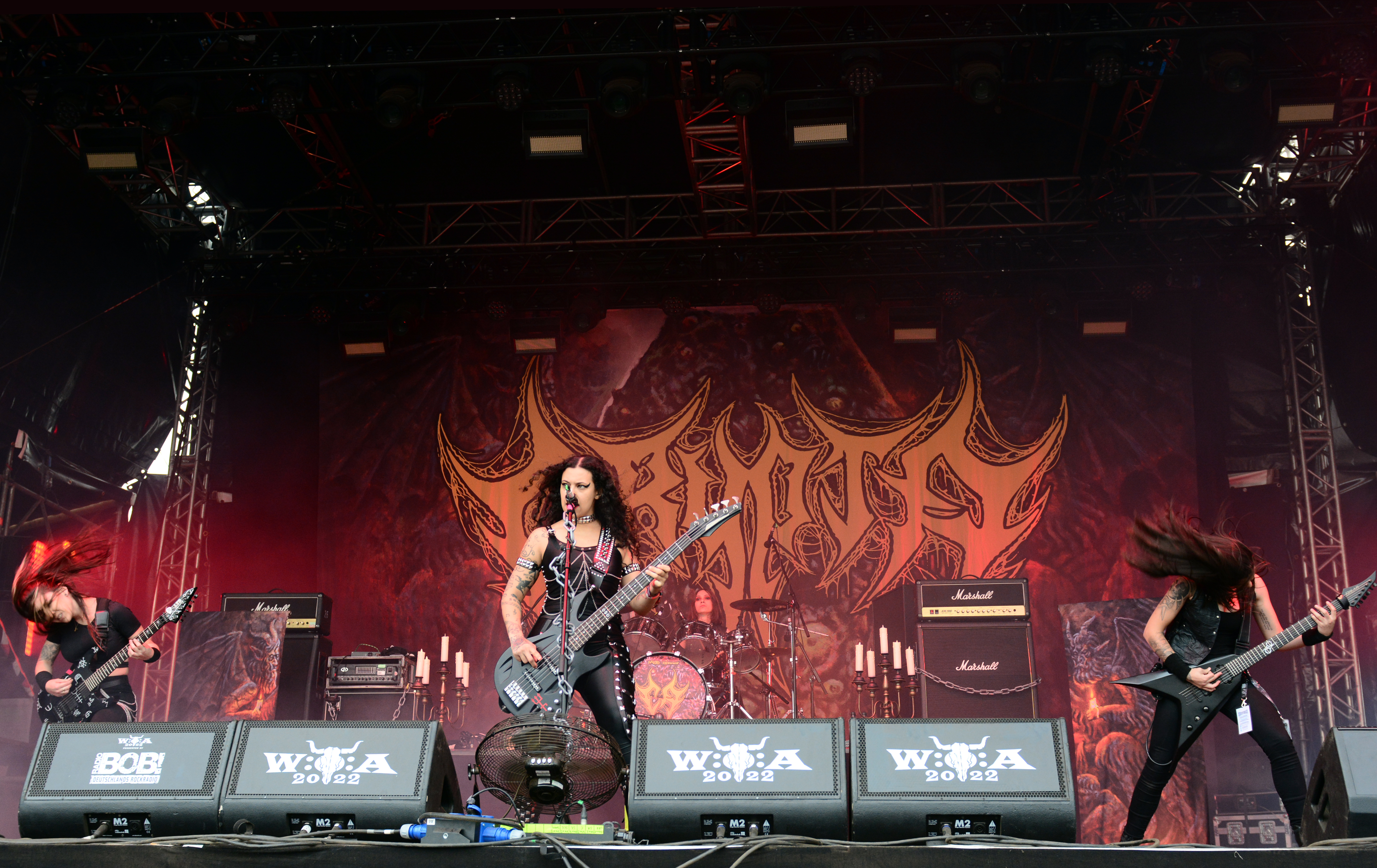
- Crypta performing at Wacken Open Air in August 2022

Background information
- Origin: São Paulo, Brazil
- Genre: Death metal
- Years active: 2019–present
- Label: Napalm Records
- Members: Fernanda Lira; Luana Dametto; Tainá Bergamaschi; Victoria Villarreal
- Past members: Sonia Nusselder; Jéssica di Falchi

Crypta is a Brazilian all-female death metal band from São Paulo, formed in 2019. Vocalist and bassist Fernanda Lira, drummer Luana Dametto, and guitarists Tainá Bergamaschi and Sonia Nusselder founded the band. The current lineup comprises Lira, Dametto, Bergamaschi, and guitarist Victoria Villarreal, who joined as a touring musician in 2025 before becoming a permanent member in 2026. Guitarist Jéssica di Falchi, a former band member, had also joined as a touring musician. Prior to forming Crypta, Lira and Dametto were in thrash metal band Nervosa.

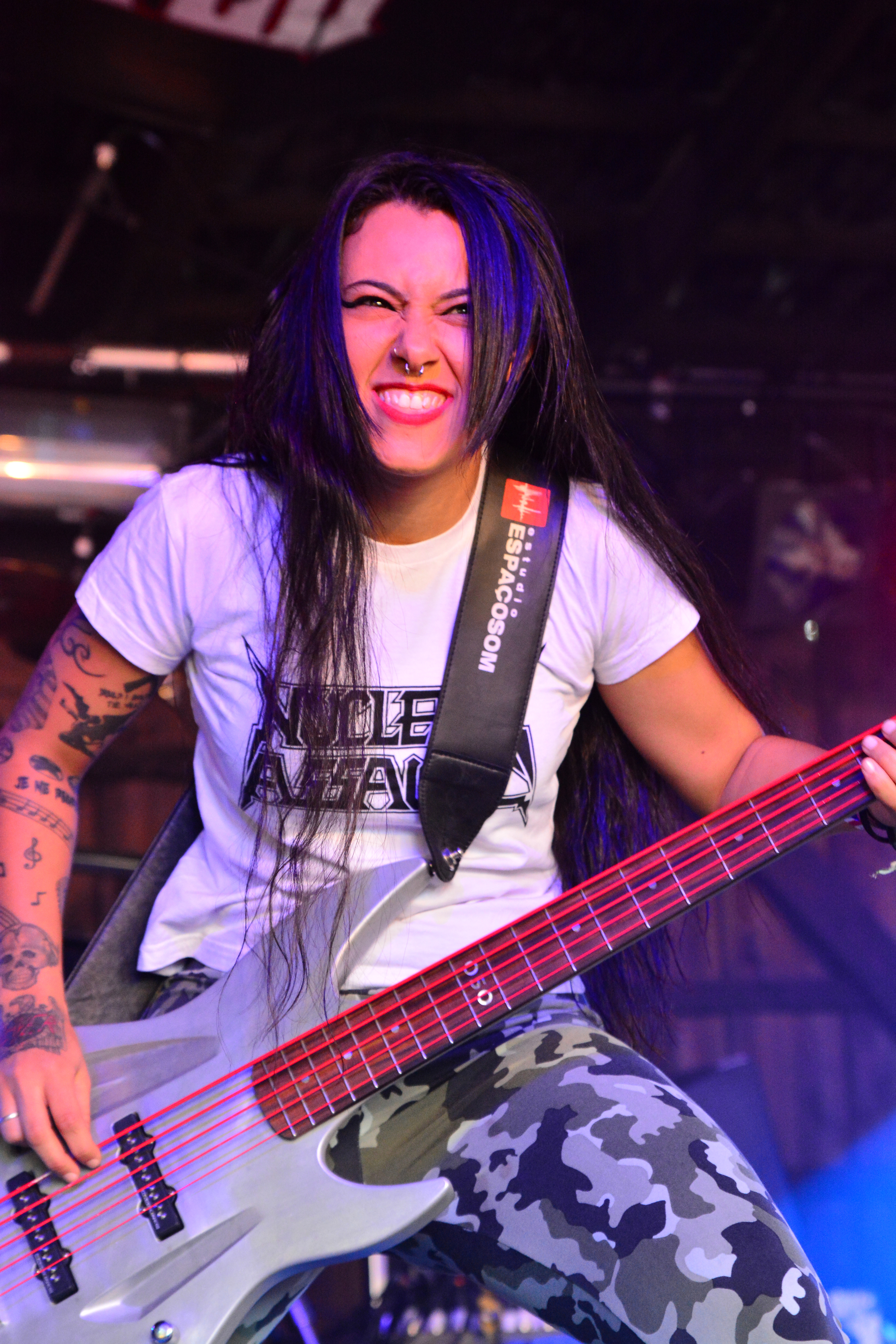
Vocalist and bassist Fernanda Lira

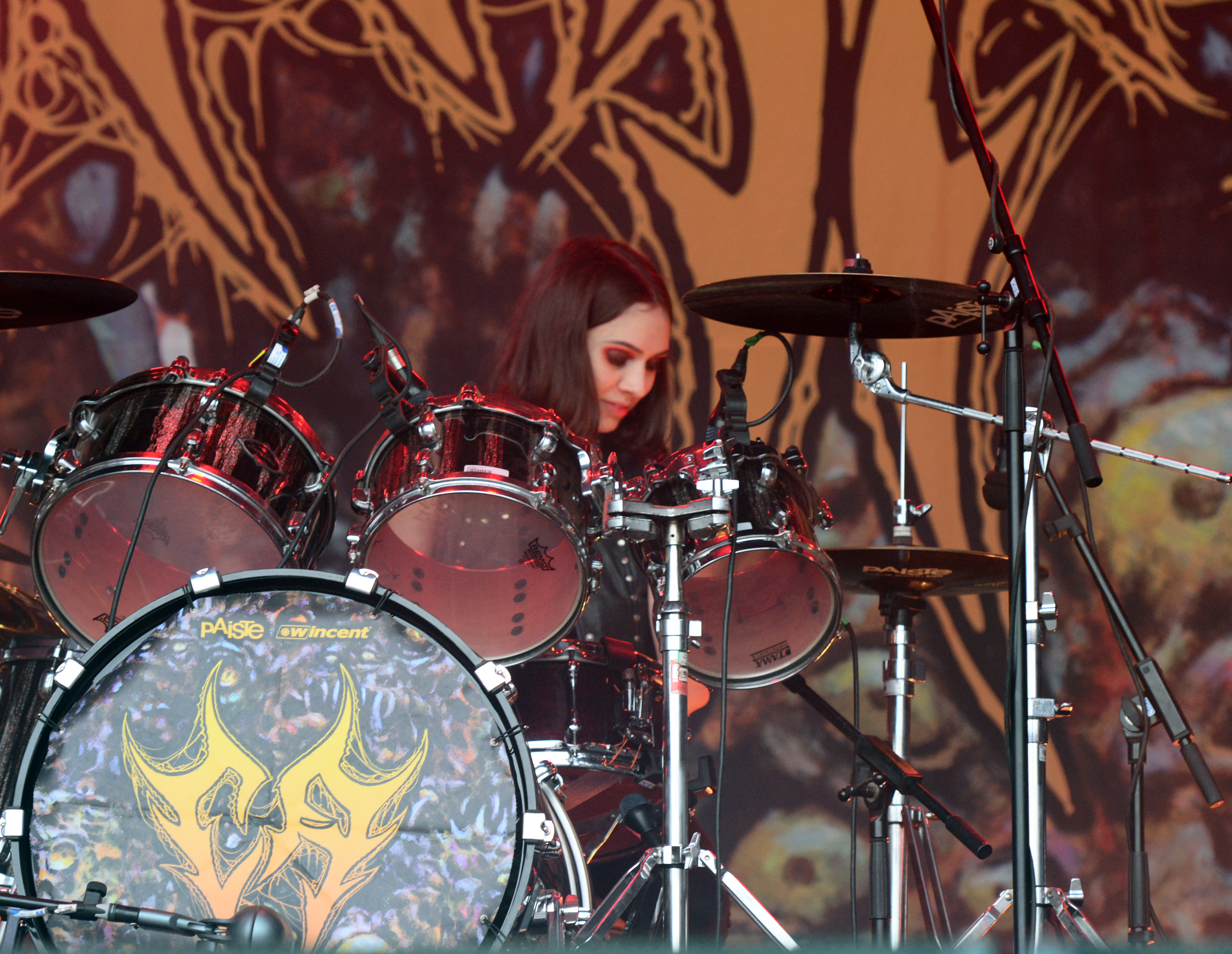
Drummer Luana Dametto

== History ==
=== Formation ===
On 25 April 2020, after straining their professional relationship, Fernanda Lira and Luana Dametto left the thrash metal band Nervosa. The following month, on 20 May, they announced that they had formed a death metal band, the genre they most identify with, called Crypta. They completed the line-up with guitarists Sonia Nusselder (ex-Burning Witches) and Tainá Bergamaschi (ex-Hagbard). Despite the announcement, the band was formed a year earlier in June 2019. On 16 June, Napalm Records announced that they would release the band's debut album. The band's first single and music video released was for the song "From The Ashes", about the story of the phoenix.

=== Echoes of the Soul ===
The band recorded their first album in early 2021 at Family Mob, a studio owned by Jean Dolabella (Ego Kill Talent, ex-Sepultura) and Estevam Romera. After releasing three singles (From the Ashes on 21 April, Starvation on 11 May and Dark Night of the Soul on 8 June,) their debut studio album, Echoes of the Soul, was released on 11 June 2021. It was mixed by Arthur Rizk (Code Orange, Power Trip) and mastered by Jens Bogren (Opeth, Dimmu Borgir, Sepultura). The cover art was created by Wes Benscoter, well known for his work with Black Sabbath, Kreator, Slayer, and many others. On 20 November, Crypta performed their first concert, at the Porão do Rock festival in Brasília, with an in-person audience and online streaming. An unreleased track from Echoes of the Soul, "I Resign", was released as a single and music video on 3 March 2022.

On 5 April 2022, through their social media networks, Nusselder announced that she amicably parted ways with Crypta to focus on a new band, Cobra Spell. On 13 April, Jéssica di Falchi was announced as the substitute for Nusselder during the band's scheduled concerts and tours, including shows at Wacken Open Air and Rock in Rio, although she was not confirmed as an official member until 5 October. Along with the announcement of di Falchi's official entry, the band confirmed that their second album was scheduled to be recorded and released in 2023.

On 31 March 2023, while performing at the Apollo Theatre in Belvidere, Illinois, the venue's roof collapsed onto the audience during a tornado. Crypta was the only band that had performed at the concert, headlined by Morbid Angel alongside Skeletal Remains and Revocation. The sole death of the collapse, 51-year-old Frederick Forest Livingston Jr., was the only audience member to buy a Crypta band shirt, and was the subject of a WLS-TV interview by Lira.

=== Shades of Sorrow ===
On 31 May 2023, Crypta announced the release of Shades of Sorrow, for 4 August. The announcement was made along with the release of the band's new single from the album, Lord of Ruins, accompanied by a music video. Before the album's release date, the singles Trial of Traitors and The Other Side of Anger were released, on 27 June and 1 August, respectively, along with music videos for both songs.

On 10 March 2025, the band announced that di Falchi departed the band, stating it was a step "taken by mutual agreement, with the decision coming from her, and being respected and accepted by the band".

=== New formation and upcoming third studio album ===
On 19 April 2026, Crypta announced, through its social media channels, that American guitarist Victoria Villarreal (Chaos Rising, ex-Syrebris) joined the band. The band also confirmed they are writing and rehearsing material for a new studio album, without prediction for its release.

== Band members ==
Crypta, band members at Rockharz 2026

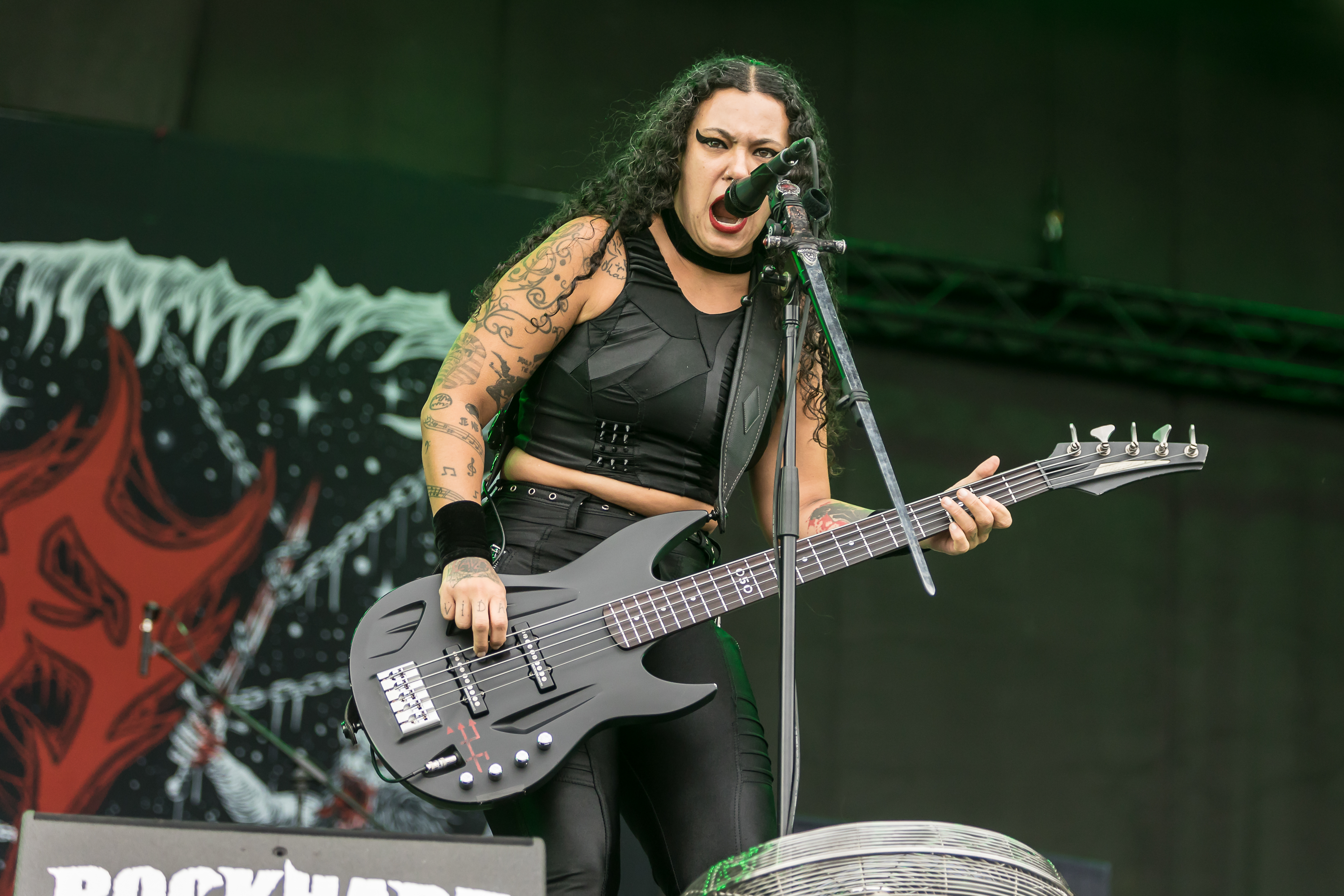
Fernanda Lira, vocals, bass

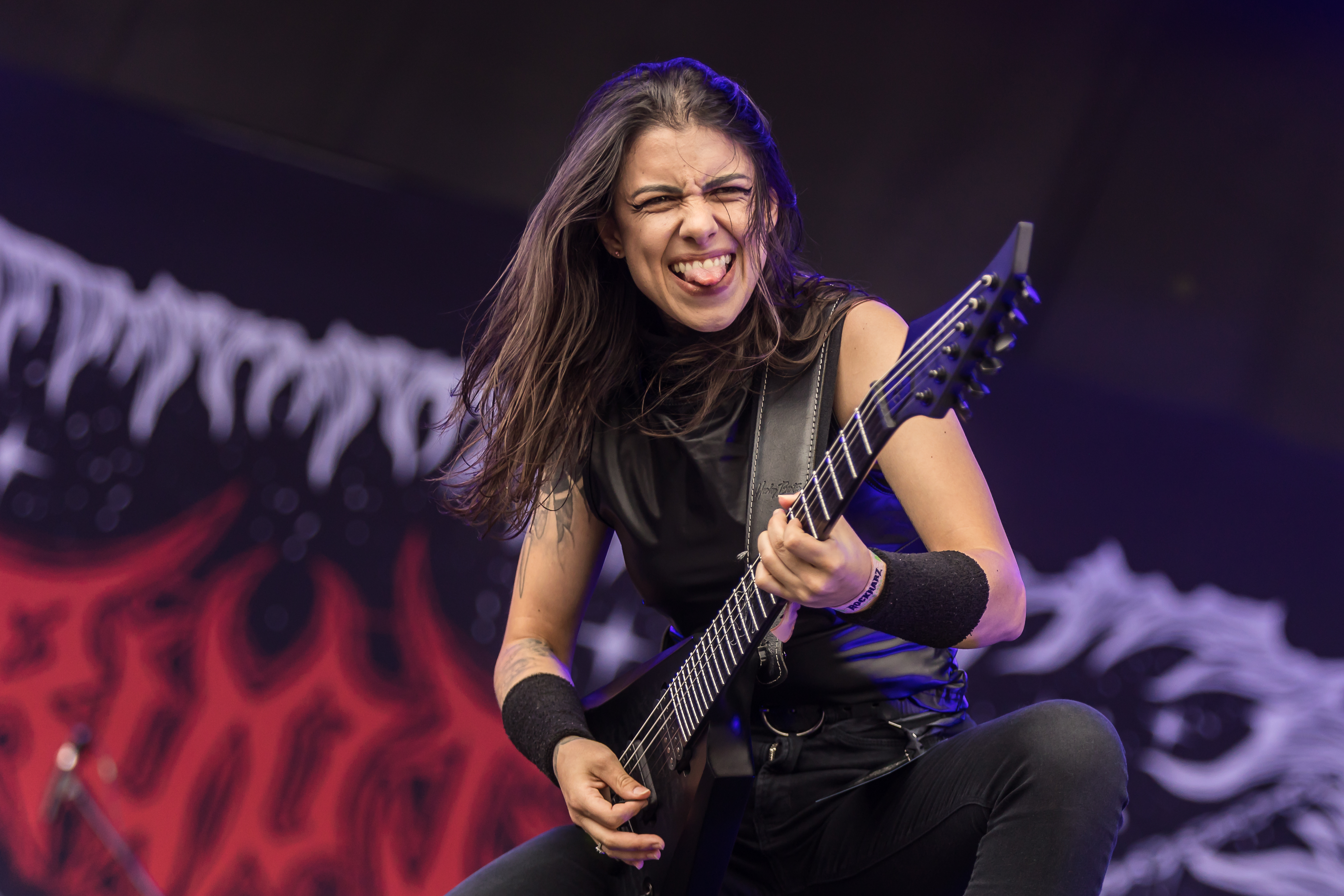
Tainá Bergamaschi, guitars

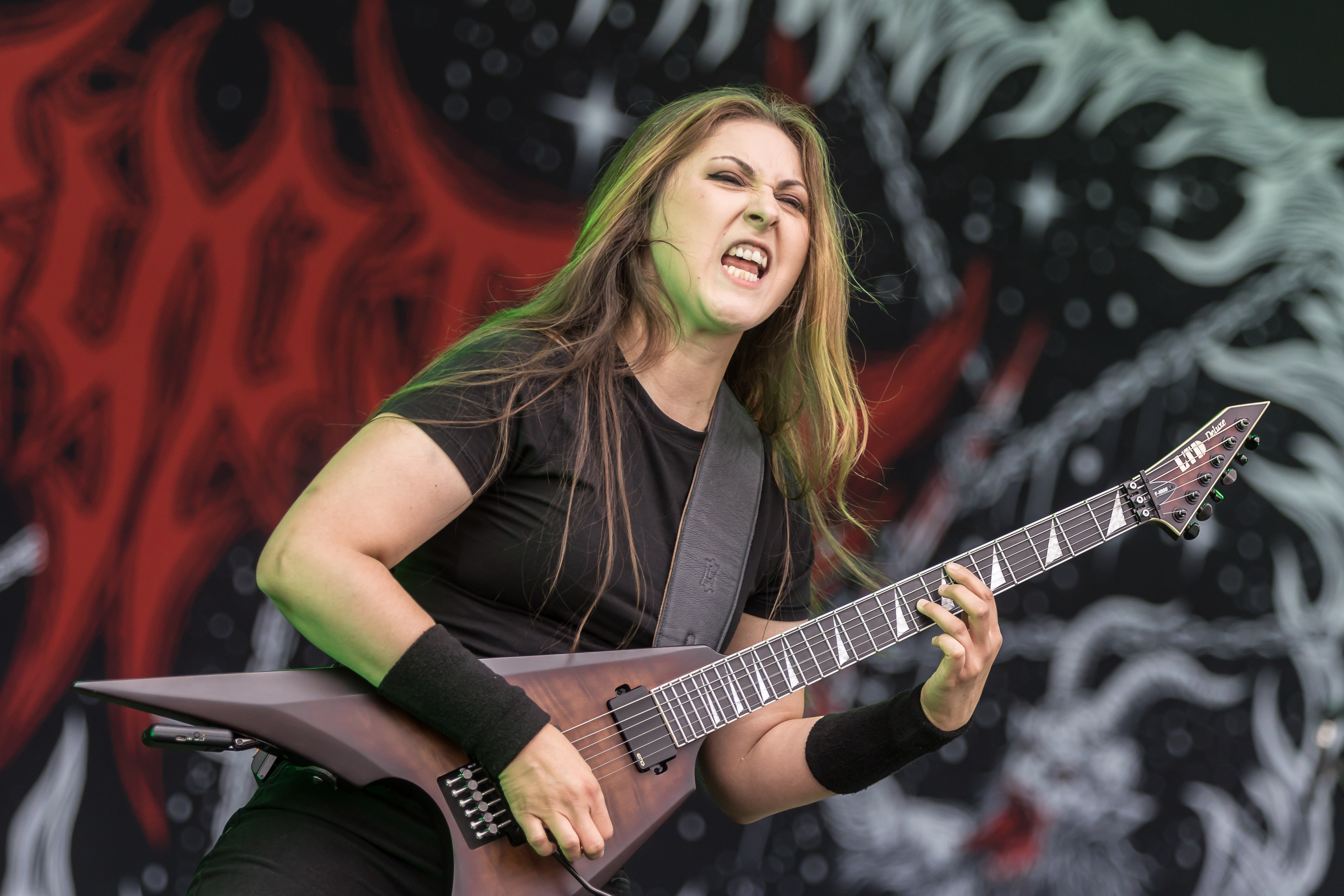
Victoria Villarreal, guitars

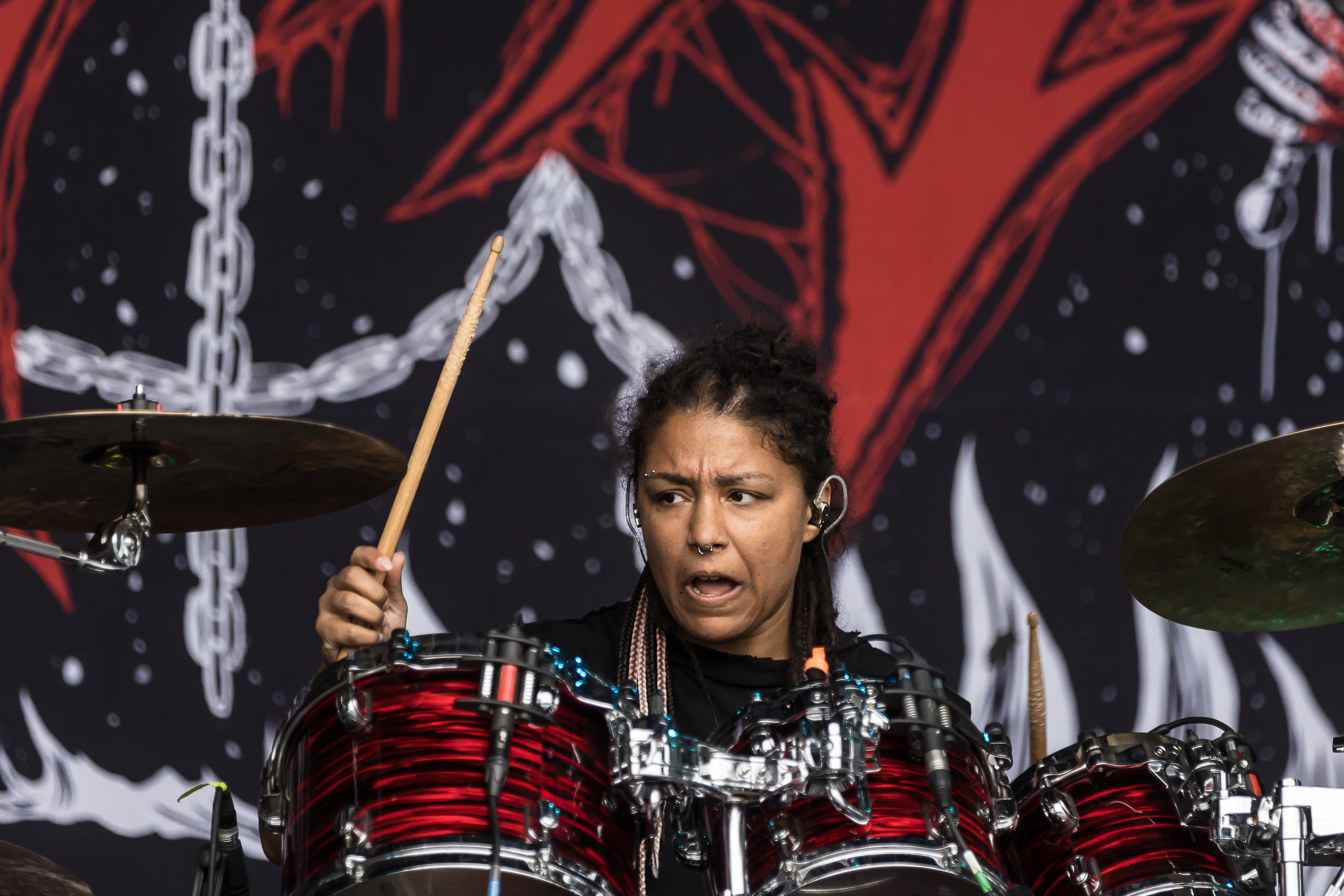
Cierra White, drums (live)

=== Current ===
- Fernanda Lira – bass, vocals (2019–present)
- Luana Dametto – drums (2019–present)
- Tainá Bergamaschi – rhythm guitar (2020–present)
- Victoria Villarreal – lead guitar (2026–present; touring 2025–2026)

=== Former ===
- Sonia "Anubis" Nusselder – lead guitar (2019–2022)
- Jéssica di Falchi – lead guitar (2022–2025; touring 2022)

=== Touring ===
- Elisa "Helly" Montin – drums (2023)
- Helena Nagagata – lead guitar (2025)
- Julia Geaman – drums (2025)
- Cierra White – drums (2026)

== Discography ==
=== Studio albums ===
- Echoes of the Soul (2021)
- Shades of Sorrow (2023)

=== Singles ===
- "From the Ashes" (2021)
- "Starvation" (2021)
- "Dark Night of the Soul" (2021)
- "I Resign" (2022)
- "Lord of Ruins" (2023)
- "Trial of Traitors" (2023)
- "The Other Side of Anger" (2023)
- "A Portrait of Decay" (2026)
