= Sorgente =

Sorgente is a surname. Notable people with the surname include:

- Alex Sorgente (born 1997), Italian park skateboarder
- Marco Antonio Sorgente (died 1597), Italian writer

== See also ==
- Sorgente Group, company
