= List of number-one hits of 2014 (Switzerland) =

This is a list of the Swiss Hitparade number ones of 2014.

== Swiss charts ==
Issue date	Song	Artist	Album	Artist
5 January	"Hey Brother"	Avicii	Racine carrée	Stromae
12 January	"Happy"	Pharrell Williams	Racine carrée	Stromae
19 January	"Happy"	Pharrell Williams	High Hopes	Bruce Springsteen
26 January	"Happy"	Pharrell Williams	High Hopes	Bruce Springsteen
2 February	"Happy"	Pharrell Williams	The Spell	Ira May
9 February	"Happy"	Pharrell Williams	Alpentainer	Trauffer
16 February	"Happy"	Pharrell Williams	Alpentainer	Trauffer
23 February	"Happy"	Pharrell Williams	Sonny Black	Bushido
2 March	"Happy"	Pharrell Williams	Öpfelboum u Palme	Ritschi
9 March	"Happy"	Pharrell Williams	G I R L	Pharrell Williams
16 March	"Happy"	Pharrell Williams	G I R L	Pharrell Williams
23 March	"Waves" (Robin Schulz Remix)	Mr Probz	Bon anniversaire	Les Enfoirés
30 March	"Waves" (Robin Schulz Remix)	Mr Probz	Out Among the Stars	Johnny Cash
6 April	"Waves" (Robin Schulz Remix)	Mr Probz	Out Among the Stars	Johnny Cash
13 April	"Happy"	Pharrell Williams	Bang!	Gotthard
20 April	"Happy"	Pharrell Williams	Caustic Love	Paolo Nutini
27 April	"Crossroads"	Shem Thomas	Bang!	Gotthard
4 May	"Happy"	Pharrell Williams	Vodka Zombie Rambo Gang	Mimiks
11 May	"The One"	Aneta Sablik	Die schönsten Mundart-Balladen – Nashville Aufnahmen	Gölä
18 May	"Traum"	Cro	King	Kollegah
25 May	"All of Me"	John Legend	Ghost Stories	Coldplay
1 June	"Traum"	Cro	Ghost Stories	Coldplay
8 June	"Traum"	Cro	Ghost Stories	Coldplay
15 June	"Prayer in C" (Robin Schulz Remix)	Lilly Wood and the Prick & Robin Schulz	Melodie	Cro
22 June	"Prayer in C" (Robin Schulz Remix)	Lilly Wood and the Prick & Robin Schulz	The Hunting Party	Linkin Park
29 June	"Prayer in C" (Robin Schulz Remix)	Lilly Wood and the Prick & Robin Schulz	X	Ed Sheeran
6 July	"Prayer in C" (Robin Schulz Remix)	Lilly Wood and the Prick & Robin Schulz	X	Ed Sheeran
13 July	"Prayer in C" (Robin Schulz Remix)	Lilly Wood and the Prick & Robin Schulz	X	Ed Sheeran
20 July	"Prayer in C" (Robin Schulz Remix)	Lilly Wood and the Prick & Robin Schulz	Ghost Stories	Coldplay
27 July	"Prayer in C" (Robin Schulz Remix)	Lilly Wood and the Prick & Robin Schulz	X	Ed Sheeran
3 August	"Prayer in C" (Robin Schulz Remix)	Lilly Wood and the Prick & Robin Schulz	Sommerträume	Die Amigos
10 August	"Prayer in C" (Robin Schulz Remix)	Lilly Wood and the Prick & Robin Schulz	Origins	Eluveitie
17 August	"Prayer in C" (Robin Schulz Remix)	Lilly Wood and the Prick & Robin Schulz	Farbenspiel	Helene Fischer
24 August	"Prayer in C" (Robin Schulz Remix)	Lilly Wood and the Prick & Robin Schulz	Farbenspiel	Helene Fischer
31 August	"Prayer in C" (Robin Schulz Remix)	Lilly Wood and the Prick & Robin Schulz	Farbenspiel	Helene Fischer
7 September	"Prayer in C" (Robin Schulz Remix)	Lilly Wood and the Prick & Robin Schulz	2014 – We Are the Party	DJ Antoine
14 September	"Prayer in C" (Robin Schulz Remix)	Lilly Wood and the Prick & Robin Schulz	Breiter als der Türsteher	Majoe
21 September	"Prayer in C" (Robin Schulz Remix)	Lilly Wood and the Prick & Robin Schulz	World on Fire	Slash featuring Myles Kennedy & the Conspirators
28 September	"Prayer in C" (Robin Schulz Remix)	Lilly Wood and the Prick & Robin Schulz	Popular Problems	Leonard Cohen
5 October	"Prayer in C" (Robin Schulz Remix)	Lilly Wood and the Prick & Robin Schulz	Fidlä ha	Franz Arnold's Wiudä Bärg
12 October	"All About That Bass"	Meghan Trainor	Fairytales – Best of 2006–2014	Sunrise Avenue
19 October	"All About That Bass"	Meghan Trainor	FVCKB!TCHE$GETMONE¥	Shindy
26 October	"All About That Bass"	Meghan Trainor	.5: The Gray Chapter	Slipknot
2 November	"All About That Bass"	Meghan Trainor	Bis hierher und viel weiter	Beatrice Egli
9 November	"All About That Bass"	Meghan Trainor	Bis hierher und viel weiter	Beatrice Egli
16 November	"Dangerous"	David Guetta featuring Sam Martin	The Endless River	Pink Floyd
23 November	"Dangerous"	David Guetta featuring Sam Martin	Märtyrer	Kool Savas
30 November	"Ensemble"	Migros-Ensemble	Dauernd jetzt	Herbert Grönemeyer
7 December	"Ensemble"	Migros-Ensemble	Rock or Bust	AC/DC
14 December	"Ensemble"	Migros-Ensemble	Rock or Bust	AC/DC
21 December	"Ensemble"	Migros-Ensemble	Rock or Bust	AC/DC
28 December	"Ensemble"	Migros-Ensemble	Rock or Bust	AC/DC

== Romandie charts ==
Issue date	Song	Artist	Album	Artist
5 January	"Hey Brother"	Avicii	Racine carrée	Stromae
12 January	"Happy"	Pharrell Williams	Racine carrée	Stromae
19 January	"Happy"	Pharrell Williams	Racine carrée	Stromae
26 January	"Happy"	Pharrell Williams	Racine carrée	Stromae
2 February	"Happy"	Pharrell Williams	Racine carrée	Stromae
9 February	"Happy"	Pharrell Williams	Racine carrée	Stromae
16 February	"Happy"	Pharrell Williams	Racine carrée	Stromae
23 February	"Happy"	Pharrell Williams	Racine carrée	Stromae
2 March	"Happy"	Pharrell Williams	Racine carrée	Stromae
9 March	"Happy"	Pharrell Williams	G I R L	Pharrell Williams
16 March	"Happy"	Pharrell Williams	G I R L	Pharrell Williams
23 March	"Happy"	Pharrell Williams	Bon anniversaire	Les Enfoirés
30 March	"Happy"	Pharrell Williams	Bon anniversaire	Les Enfoirés
6 April	"Happy"	Pharrell Williams	Bon anniversaire	Les Enfoirés
13 April	"Happy"	Pharrell Williams	Bang!	Gotthard
20 April	"Happy"	Pharrell Williams	Racine carrée	Stromae
27 April	"Happy"	Pharrell Williams	Racine carrée	Stromae
4 May	"Happy"	Pharrell Williams	Racine carrée	Stromae
11 May	"A Sky Full of Stars"	Coldplay	Racine carrée	Stromae
18 May	"All of Me"	John Legend	Xscape	Michael Jackson
25 May	"All of Me"	John Legend	Ghost Stories	Coldplay
1 June	"All of Me"	John Legend	Ghost Stories	Coldplay
8 June	"All of Me"	John Legend	Ghost Stories	Coldplay
15 June	"Dare (La La La)"	Shakira	Lazaretto	Jack White
22 June	"We Are One (Ole Ola)"	Pitbull featuring Jennifer Lopez & Claudia Leitte	Ultraviolence	Lana Del Rey
29 June	"Dare (La La La)"	Shakira	X	Ed Sheeran
6 July	"Prayer in C" (Robin Schulz Remix)	Lilly Wood and the Prick & Robin Schulz	Ultraviolence	Lana Del Rey
13 July	"Prayer in C" (Robin Schulz Remix)	Lilly Wood and the Prick & Robin Schulz	Ghost Stories	Coldplay
20 July	"Prayer in C" (Robin Schulz Remix)	Lilly Wood and the Prick & Robin Schulz	Ghost Stories	Coldplay
27 July	"Prayer in C" (Robin Schulz Remix)	Lilly Wood and the Prick & Robin Schulz	Racine carrée	Stromae
3 August	"Prayer in C" (Robin Schulz Remix)	Lilly Wood and the Prick & Robin Schulz	Racine carrée	Stromae
10 August	"Prayer in C" (Robin Schulz Remix)	Lilly Wood and the Prick & Robin Schulz	Racine carrée	Stromae
17 August	"Prayer in C" (Robin Schulz Remix)	Lilly Wood and the Prick & Robin Schulz	Racine carrée	Stromae
24 August	"Prayer in C" (Robin Schulz Remix)	Lilly Wood and the Prick & Robin Schulz	Les feux d'artifice	Calogero
31 August	"Prayer in C" (Robin Schulz Remix)	Lilly Wood and the Prick & Robin Schulz	Inspiré de faits réels	Bénabar
7 September	"Prayer in C" (Robin Schulz Remix)	Lilly Wood and the Prick & Robin Schulz	V	Maroon 5
14 September	"Prayer in C" (Robin Schulz Remix)	Lilly Wood and the Prick & Robin Schulz	Lullaby and... The Ceaseless Roar	Robert Plant
21 September	"Prayer in C" (Robin Schulz Remix)	Lilly Wood and the Prick & Robin Schulz	World On Fire	Slash featuring Myles Kennedy & the Conspirators
28 September	"Prayer in C" (Robin Schulz Remix)	Lilly Wood and the Prick & Robin Schulz	Popular Problems	Leonard Cohen
5 October	"Prayer in C" (Robin Schulz Remix)	Lilly Wood and the Prick & Robin Schulz	Popular Problems	Leonard Cohen
12 October	"Prayer in C" (Robin Schulz Remix)	Lilly Wood and the Prick & Robin Schulz	Strut	Lenny Kravitz
19 October	"Prayer in C" (Robin Schulz Remix)	Lilly Wood and the Prick & Robin Schulz	Songs of Innocence	U2
26 October	"Prayer in C" (Robin Schulz Remix)	Lilly Wood and the Prick & Robin Schulz	.5: The Gray Chapter	Slipknot
2 November	"Prayer in C" (Robin Schulz Remix)	Lilly Wood and the Prick & Robin Schulz	1989	Taylor Swift
9 November	"Chandelier"	Sia	Je suis en vie	Akhenaton
16 November	"Dangerous"	David Guetta featuring Sam Martin	The Endless River	Pink Floyd
23 November	"Dangerous"	David Guetta featuring Sam Martin	Rester vivant	Johnny Hallyday
30 November	"Ensemble"	Migros-Ensemble	Rester vivant	Johnny Hallyday
7 December	"Ensemble"	Migros-Ensemble	Rock or Bust	AC/DC
14 December	"Ensemble"	Migros-Ensemble	Rock or Bust	AC/DC
21 December	"Ensemble"	Migros-Ensemble	Les Enfoirés en chœur – De 1985 à aujourd'hui	Les Enfoirés
28 December	"Ensemble"	Migros-Ensemble	Les Enfoirés en chœur – De 1985 à aujourd'hui	Les Enfoirés
