= Marco Antonio Sorgente =

Italian writer

Marco Antonio Sorgente (died 1597) was an Italian writer mainly regarding Neapolitan political traditions and laws. Only a single book by him was published with the help of his brother Muzio. Born to an aristocratic family, Marco Antonio studied law in Naples under the encouragement of his uncle, Marino Freccia. His take on the laws reflect reforms initiated by the viceroy Pedro de Toledo. Isodoro Tranchini in his short biographical entry calls the work a faticosa ...farraggine de cose diverse (a tired hodge-podge of many things).

== Works ==
- Di Napoli illustrata liber unicus
