= Brothertunes =

- Origin: Bern, Switzerland
- Genres: Pop, Soul
- Years active: 2002–present
- Labels: Nation Music, Believe Digital
- Members: Rich Fonje; Philly Hansen
- Website: www.brothertunes.com

Brothertunes is a pop music group from Bern, Switzerland. The founding members consist of Rich Fonje (vocals) and Philly Hansen (guitarist).

== Musical career ==
Brothertunes' first radio single "Sincerely Yours" from their first officially released studio album Come Close entered the Swiss charts directly into the Top 50. In April 2006, Brothertunes was voted the Swiss Top Act of the Month by Swiss national Radio DRS 3.

Shortly after their initial radio success, the German music magazine "Musikmarkt" highlighted Fonje and Hansen and their album Come Close and declared the duo a top act and promising talent whose talents would be recognized beyond Swiss borders. Further success followed in October 2006, when Brothertunes were voted by listeners of Radio Swiss Pop (FM 103.8) as the "Swiss Newcomers of the Year," which was the first time that such an award was presented by Radio Swiss Pop.

In 2008, Brothertunes released their second album A Million Things To Say. The album was produced by Grammy Award winner Van Hunt, who produced the first radio single, "Starship," which was the first of the three album single releases and became a Top 20 radio hit in Switzerland. The album was mixed by Hans-Martin Buff, who worked for over four years at the Paisley Park Studios and as personal engineer for Prince.

Brothertunes' latest EP, Who Needs Love! is scheduled for release on November 22, 2010.

== Discography ==
- 2006: Come Close
- 2008: A Million Things to Say
- 2010: Who Needs Love!
- 2014: "This Woman"

== Singles ==
- 2014: "Stubborn love"
- 2014: "Pity me"
- 2011: "Say it again"
- 2010: "Who needs love!"
- 2008: "Starship"
- 2008: "No moment to waste"
- 2008: "Better"
- 2006: "Sincerely Yours"
- 2006: "Come close"
- 2006: "Back on me"

== Awards and nominations ==
- 2005: First Prize in the Pop/Rock category at the 2005 M4Music Festival
- 2006: Swiss National Radio DRS 3 - Swiss Top Act of the Month (April 2006)
- 2006: Radio Swiss Pop (FM 103.8) - "Swiss Newcomers of the Year" (October 2006)
- 2010: French Radio Méga FM (FM 96.5) - "Newcomers of the Week" (November 8-14th 2010)
- 2011: Finalist Caprices Festival - "Best New Talents" (April 2011)
