= Kurdo (rapper) =

German rapper of Kurdish Descent

- Born: Kurdo Jalal Omar Abdulqadir; 30 November 1988 (age 37); Sulaymaniyah, Kurdistan Region, Iraq
- Origin: Heidelberg, Germany
- Genres: Hip hop
- Occupation: Rapper
- Years active: 2011–present
- Labels: Azzlackz, Almaz Musiq

Kurdo Jalal Omar Abdulqadir (Kurdish: كوردۆ جه‌لال عومه‌ر عه‌بدولقادر, born 30 November 1988) better known by the mononym Kurdo is a German rapper of Iraqi Kurdish origin from Heidelberg, Germany.

Born in the city of Sulaymaniyah in the Kurdistan Region of northern Iraq, he immigrated with his family to Germany when he was eight. In 2011, he launched his music through YouTube and was signed by the label Azzlackz. A few months later, he founded his own label Beefhaus with a debut mixtape 11ta Stock Sound and the single "Nike Kappe". In 2014, he released his debut album Slum Dog Millionaer with collaborations with Eko Fresh, KC Rebell, Mosh36, Misel439, Nazar, and Kontra K. As of 2022, Kurdo has many viral hits with listeners from all over the world, from his worldwide famous songs "Alles Coco", "Ya Salam", and others released in previous years.

On 10 September 2014, Kurdo announced his self-founded label Almaz Musiq that released his second album, Almaz, followed by Verbrecher aus der Wüste in 2016, Vision in 2017, Blanco in 2017, and Miserabel in 2022. He has charted in Germany, Austria and Switzerland.

== Discography ==
=== Albums ===
Year	Title	Chart		
Year	Title	GER	AUT	SWI
2014	Slum Dog Millionaer	6	28	16
2015	Almaz	3	7	1
2016	Verbrecher aus der Wüste	2	4	4
2017	Vision	8	10	9
2019	11ta Stock Sound 2	2	7	4
2022	Miserabel	13	27	16

=== Collaboration albums ===
Year	Title	Chart		
Year	Title	GER	AUT	SWI
2017	Blanco (with Majoe)	6	7	7

=== Mixtapes ===
Year	Title
2012	11ta Stock Sound

=== Singles ===
Year	Title	Chart		
Year	Title	GER	AUT	SWI
2012	"Nike Kappe umgekehrt"	–	–	–
2014	"Stresserblick" (Majoe feat. Kurdo)	92	–	–
2017	"Ya Salam"	30	–	88
2017	"Desert Eagle" (Kurdo & Majoe)	68	–	99
2018	"Bugatti Veyron"	41	–	–
2018	"Wellou"	–	54	38
2018	"Sinaloa Kartell" (Gent feat. Fousy)	–	–	–
2019	"100 K" (Gent feat. Kurdo)	71	–	–
2019	"Regentropfen"	68	–	94
2019	"Alles Coco"	57	–	–
2021	"Planet Maymun"	–	–	–
2021	"Miserabel"	–	–	–
2021	"NKT"	–	–	–
2021	"PISMAM"	–	–	–
2021	"Immer echter"	–	–	–
2021	"Bébé"	–	–	–
2021	"Weisse TN sneakers"	–	–	–
2021	"Butterfly" (feat. NGEE)	–	–	–
2021	"Awimbawe" (feat. Capo)	–	–	–
