= Stiller Has =

Swiss band

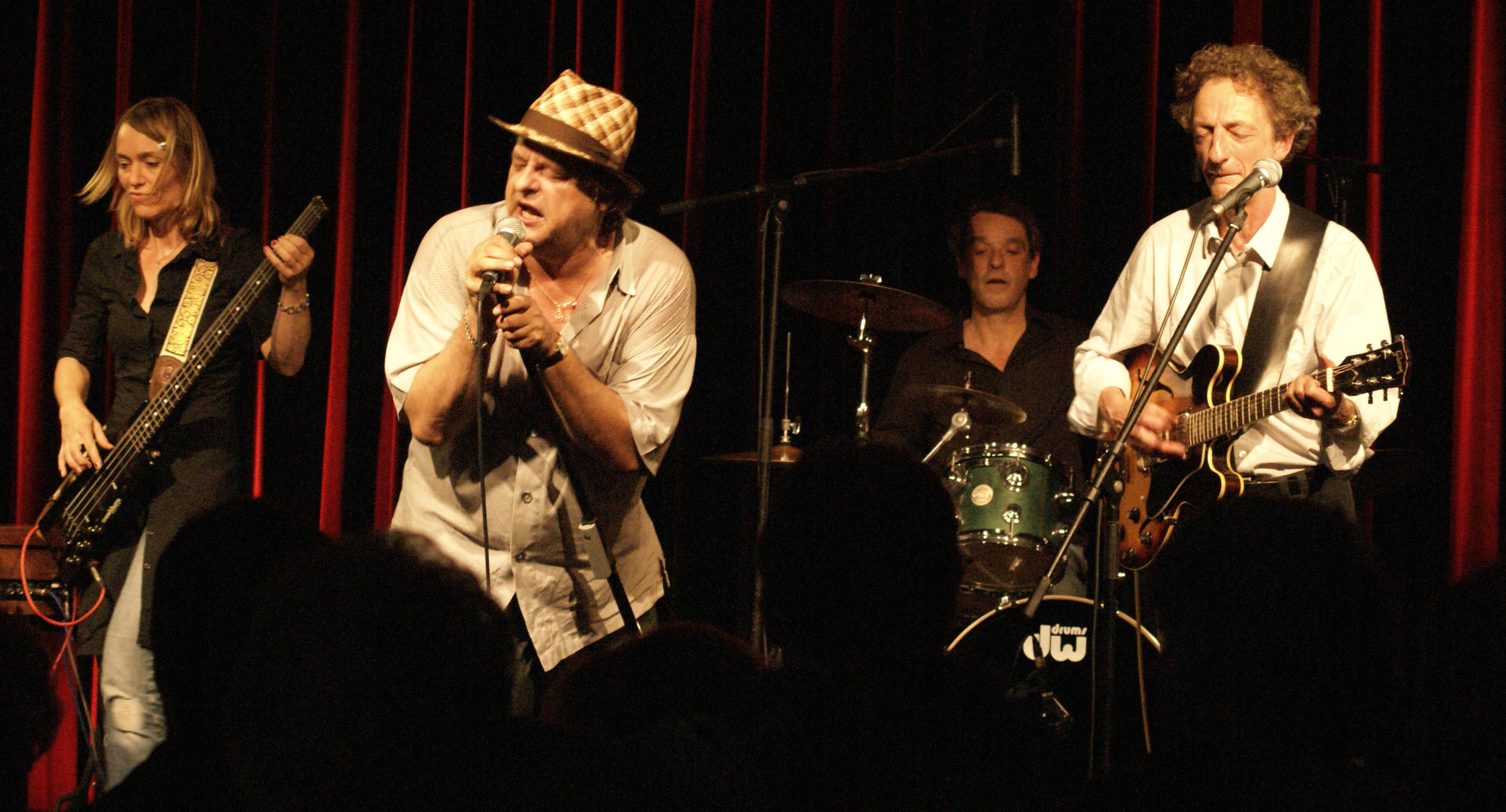
- Stiller Has in 2009: Buser, Anaconda, Fürst, Schafer (from left to right)

Background information
- Origin: Bern, Switzerland
- Genres: Mundart (Bernese German)
- Years active: 1989–present
- Members: Roman Wyss; Boris Klečić; Andreas Wyss; Andi Pupato
- Past members: Endo Anaconda (died 2022); Balts Nill (until 2005); Salome Buser (until 2016); Markus Fürst (until 2016); René "Schifer" Schafer (until 2016)
- Website: www.stillerhas.ch

Stiller Has (German for Silent Hare) are a music band, originally a duo consisting of Endo Anaconda and Balts Nill, founded in 1989 in Bern, Switzerland. Considering themselves part of the Kleinkunst, or "small stage art" scene, they have nonetheless become a cult band across the German-speaking Switzerland.

Stiller Has perform in Mundart, their native Bernese German, singing - as the Berner Zeitung put it - "about a piece of Switzerland that is paid little attention ... the middle country, the middle classes, the poor, the mediocre. ... Those that bitch about their fate, get drunk and get bitten in the butt by their own dog". The NZZ has assessed them as "the band that has described and sung about the existential orientation of Switzerland like no one else".

To date, Stiller Has have made numerous tours across Switzerland and released 15 CDs. In 1995, they received the Salzburger Stier and the Deutscher Kleinkunstpreis, the two most notable small stage art awards in the German-speaking countries. In May 2007 Stiller Has received the Liederpreis 2007 for their song Geischterbahn.

== Discography ==
- Stiller Has (1989) (on MC), 2001 re-edition on CD)
- Der Wolf ist los (1991)
- Landjäger (1994)
- Moudi (1996)
- Live auf Moudi Tour (1996)
- Chole (1998)
- Walliselle (2000)
- Stiller Has (2001)
- Stelzen (2002)
- Poulet Tour (2004, live)
- Geisterbahn (2006)
- Zwanzig Goldige Hasensongs (2007, compilation)
- So verdorbe (2009)
- Böses Alter (2013)
- Alterswild (2015, live)
- Endosaurusrex (2017)
- Pfadfinder (2020)
