= Swiss Hitparade =

Swiss music charts

The Swiss Hitparade (German: Schweizer Hitparade) is Switzerland's main music sales charts. The charts are a record of the highest-selling singles and albums in various genres in Switzerland.

The Swiss charts include:

- Singles Top 75 (released since 1968)
- Singles Top 100
- Albums Top 100 (released since late 1983)
- Compilations Top 20
- Airplay Top 30
- Streaming Top 100
- Swiss Artist Singles Top 10
- Swiss Artist Albums Top 10
- Vinyl Albums Top 10
- Rock Albums Top 5
- Pop Albums Top 5
- Hip Hop Albums Top 5

Since 2010, Hitparade's compiler Media Control has also set up Les Charts, a record chart of the highest-selling singles and albums in Romandie, the Francophone region of Switzerland:

- Romandie Singles Top 20 (discontinued)
- Romandie Albums Top 50

The charts are updated weekly on Sundays, and are posted publicly on the preceding Wednesday mornings.

== See also ==
- List of number-one singles in Switzerland
