= Cro discography =

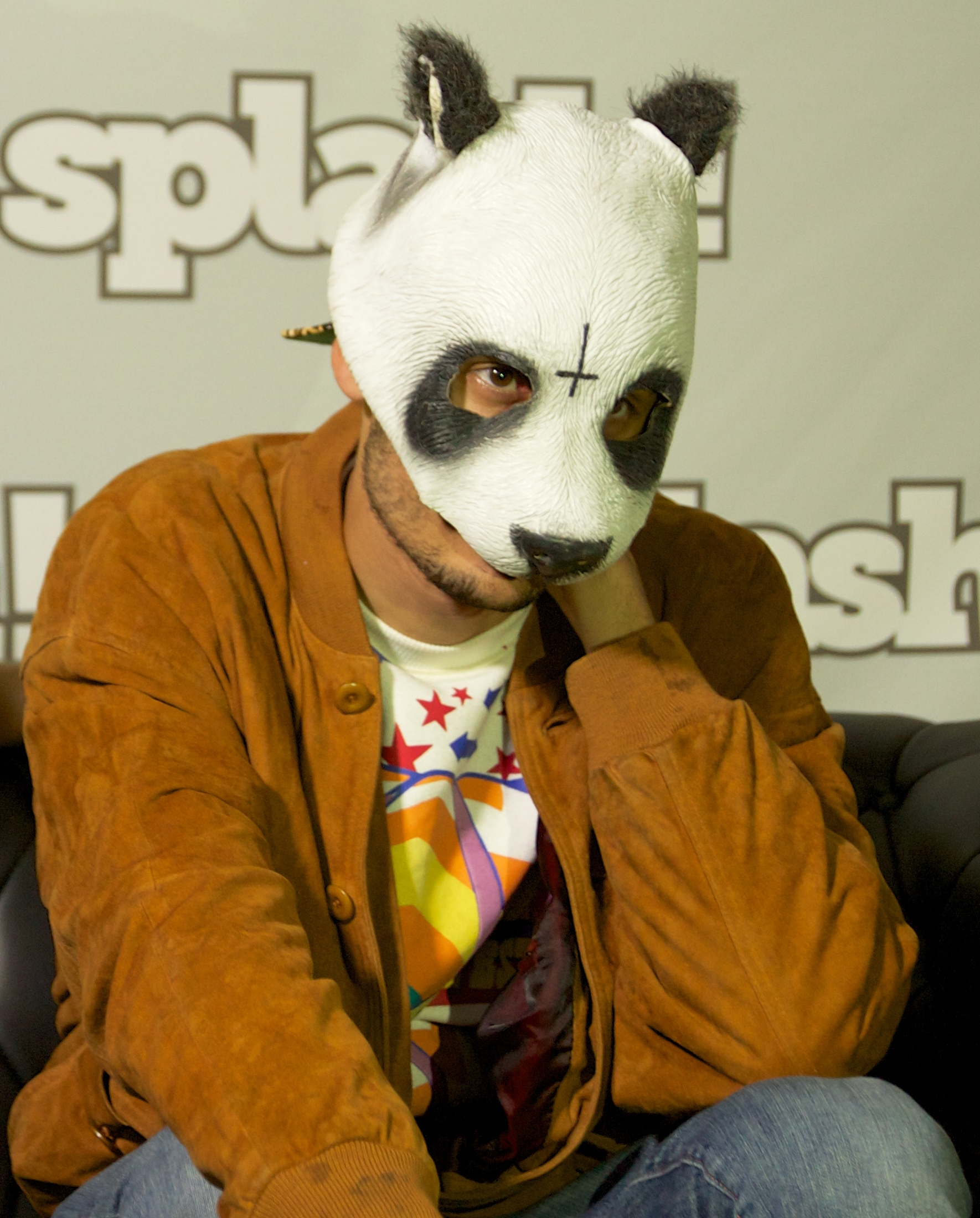
- Cro at the 2012 Splash! festival
- Studio albums: 5
- Singles: 27
- Music videos: 4
- Mixtapes: 4

German rapper Cro has released four studio albums, four mixtapes and 27 singles.

== Albums ==
=== Studio albums ===
Title	Album details	Peak chart positions				Certifications
Title	Album details	GER	GER HH	AUT	SWI	Certifications
Raop	Released: 6 July 2012; Label: Chimperator Productions; Formats: CD, digital download	1	12	1	7	BVMI: 7× Gold; IFPI AUT: Platinum; IFPI SWI: Gold
Raop +5	Released: 5 July 2013; Label: Chimperator Productions; Formats: CD, digital download	1	12	1	7	BVMI: 7× Gold; IFPI AUT: Platinum; IFPI SWI: Gold
Melodie	Released: 6 June 2014; Label: Chimperator Productions; Formats: CD, digital download	1	5	1	1	BVMI: Platinum; IFPI AUT: Gold; IFPI SWI: Gold
tru.	Released: 8 September 2017; Label: Chimperator Productions; Formats: CD, digital download	1	1	1	2	BVMI: Gold
Trip	Released: 30 April 2021; Label: Chimperator Productions; Formats: CD, digital download	1	—	2	8	
11:11	Released: 11 August 2022; Label: Chimperator Productions; Formats: CD, digital download	1	—	1	3	

=== Live albums ===
List of albums, with selected chart positions
Title	Album details	Peak chart positions				Certifications
Title	Album details	GER	GER HH	AUT	SWI	Certifications
MTV Unplugged	Released: 3 July 2015; Label: Chimperator; Format: DVD, CD, digital download	1	1	1	1	BVMI: Platinum; IFPI AUT: Gold

=== Mixtapes ===
Title	Details
Trash	Released: 2009; Label: Self-released; Formats: Digital download
Meine Musik	Released: 2011; Label: Self-released; Formats: Digital download
Easy	Released: 2 December 2011; Label: Chimperator Productions; Formats: Digital download
Sunny	Released: 29 June 2013; Label: Chimperator Productions; Formats: Digital download

== Singles ==
=== As lead artist ===
Title	Year	Peak chart positions			Certifications	Album
Title	Year	GER	AUT	SWI	Certifications	Album
"Easy"	2012	2	4	22	BVMI: 3× Platinum; IFPI AUT: Platinum; IFPI SWI: Platinum	Raop
"Du"	2012	2	10	42	BVMI: 2× Platinum; IFPI AUT: Gold; IFPI SWI: Gold	Raop
"King of Raop"	2012	24	63	—		Raop
"Meine Zeit"	2012	33	69	—		Raop
"1.000.000 Pandas"	2012	—	26	—		Raop
"Einmal um die Welt"	2012	8	1	27	BVMI: 3× Gold; IFPI AUT: Platinum; IFPI SWI: Gold	Raop
"Whatever"	2013	1	3	6	BVMI: 3× Gold; IFPI AUT: Platinum; IFPI SWI: Gold	Raop +5
"Traum"	2014	1	1	1	BVMI: Diamond; IFPI AUT: Platinum; IFPI SWI: Platinum	Melodie
"Bad Chick"	2014	9	28	69	BVMI: 3× Gold	Melodie
"Hey Girl"	2014	35	52	34	BVMI: Gold	Melodie
"Bye Bye"	2015	1	2	7	BVMI: 2× Platinum	MTV Unplugged
"Melodie"	2015	44	14	49	BVMI: Gold	Melodie / MTV Unplugged
"Unendlichkeit"	2017	13	14	42	BVMI: 3× Gold; IFPI AUT: Gold	tru.
"Baum"	2017	79	49	—		tru.
"Tru"	2017	77	69	—		tru.
"Computiful (Carlifornia RMX)"	2018	—	—	—		Non-album singles
"10419" (with Trettmann and Kitschkrieg)	2018	24	29	78	IFPI AUT: Gold	Non-album singles
"Oneway"	2018	48	41	—		Non-album singles
"Victoria's Secret"	2018	86	70	—		Non-album singles
"1000 Hits" (with Jamule)	2019	14	13	30	BVMI: Gold	Non-album singles
"Fall auf" (with Badchieff)	2020	36	20	74		Non-album singles
"Endless Summer"	2020	—	—	—		Trip
"LMF2"	2020	—	—	—		Trip
"Dich"	2020	90	—	—		Trip
"Hoch"	2020	—	70	—		Trip
"Alles dope"	2021	22	14	62		Trip
"SYGL" (featuring Shindy)	2021	9	9	33		Trip
"Smooth"	2021	51	46	96		Trip
"Hör nicht auf" (featuring Teesy)	2021	45	44	—		Trip

=== As featured artist ===
Title	Year	Peak chart positions			Album
Title	Year	GER	AUT	SWI	Album
"Horst & Monika" (Die Orsons feat. Cro)	2012	34	—	—	Das Chaos und die Ordnung
"Fühlt sich wie Fliegen an" (Max Herre feat. Clueso & Cro)	2012	27	47	—	Hallo Welt!
"Do They Know It's Christmas?" (Band Aid 30 feat. Cro)	2014	1	10	21	Non-album single
"5 Minuten" (KitschKrieg featuring Cro, AnnenMayKantereit and Trettmann)	2019	10	13	38	Non-album single
"1975" (Majan featuring Cro)	2019	52	—	97	Non-album single
"Frühstück in Paris" (with Capital Bra)	2020	1	1	3	CB7
"Bei Nacht" (with RAF Camora)	2023	6	1	10	XV

== Other charted songs ==
Title	Year	Peak chart positions			Album
Title	Year	GER	AUT	SWI	Album
"Hi Kids"	2012	57	50	—	Easy
"Ein Teil"	2012	95	—	—	Raop
"Nie mehr"	2012	98	—	—	Raop
"Starting Over"	2012	43	63	—	Einmal um die Welt – EP
"Wie du"	2013	59	—	—	Raop +5
"Jetzt"	2014	55	54	—	Melodie
"Meine Gang (Bang Bang)" (featuring Dajuan)	2014	75	61	—	Melodie
"Todas" (featuring Wyclef Jean)	2017	65	55	—	tru.
"Noch da"	2018	86	57	79	tru.
"—" denotes a recording that did not chart or was not released in that territory.

== Music videos ==
List of music videos as lead artist, showing directors
Title	Year	Director(s)	Ref.
"Easy"	2011	Harris Hodovic	
"Du"	2012	Niels Münter	
"King of Raop"	2012	Formzwei	
"Meine Zeit"	2012	Ndilyo Nimindé	
"1 Million"	2012	Unknown	
"Einmal um die Welt"	2012	Ramon Rigoni, Stefan Tauber	
"Whatever"	2013	Illuminati Film	
"Traum"	2014	Lars Timmermann	
"Meine Gang"	2014	Martin Schreier	
"Bad Chick"	2014	Niels Münter	
"Hey Girl"	2014	Lars Timmermann, Daniel Titz	
"Hi Kids"	2014	Unknown	
"Dream"	2015	Lars Timmermann	
