= 2013 Echo Awards =

- Official poster
- Date: March 21, 2013
- Location: Palais am Berliner Funkturm, Berlin, Germany
- Hosted by: Helene Fischer
- Website: http://www.echopop.de/

Television/radio coverage
- Network: Das Erste

The 22nd Annual Echo Awards were held on March 21, 2013, at the Palais am Berliner Funkturm in Berlin. The show was broadcast on Das Erste and was hosted for the first time by Schlager entertainer Helene Fischer. Nominations for all 27 award categories were announced on January 31, 2013.

Die Toten Hosen won the most number of awards during the ceremony, with four, including the Echo for Song of the Year for "Tage wie diese" and Album of the Year for Ballast der Republik. In addition, the band was awarded Best National Rock/Pop Group and Producers of the Year along with Vincent Sorg. Other multiple winners include: Cro, Unheilig, Lana Del Rey and host Helene Fischer with two awards each.

== Performers ==
The following performed on the main telecast:

- Carla Bruni – "Mon Raymond"
- Cascada "Glorious"
- Cro – "Einmal um die Welt"
- Depeche Mode – "Heaven"
- Frida Gold – "Liebe ist meine Rebellion"
- David Garrett – "Viva la Vida"
- Helene Fischer – "Let Me Entertain You"
- Hurts – "Miracle"
- Lena – "Neon (Lonely People)"
- Peter Plate – "Wir beide sind Musik"
- Emeli Sandé – "Read All About It, Part III"
- Santiano & Andreas Gabalier – "Es gibt nur Wasser"
- Seeed – "Deine Zeit"
- Silly – "Deine Stärken"
- Hannes Wader & Die Toten Hosen – "Heute hier, morgen dort"

== Winners and nominees ==
=== Awards ===
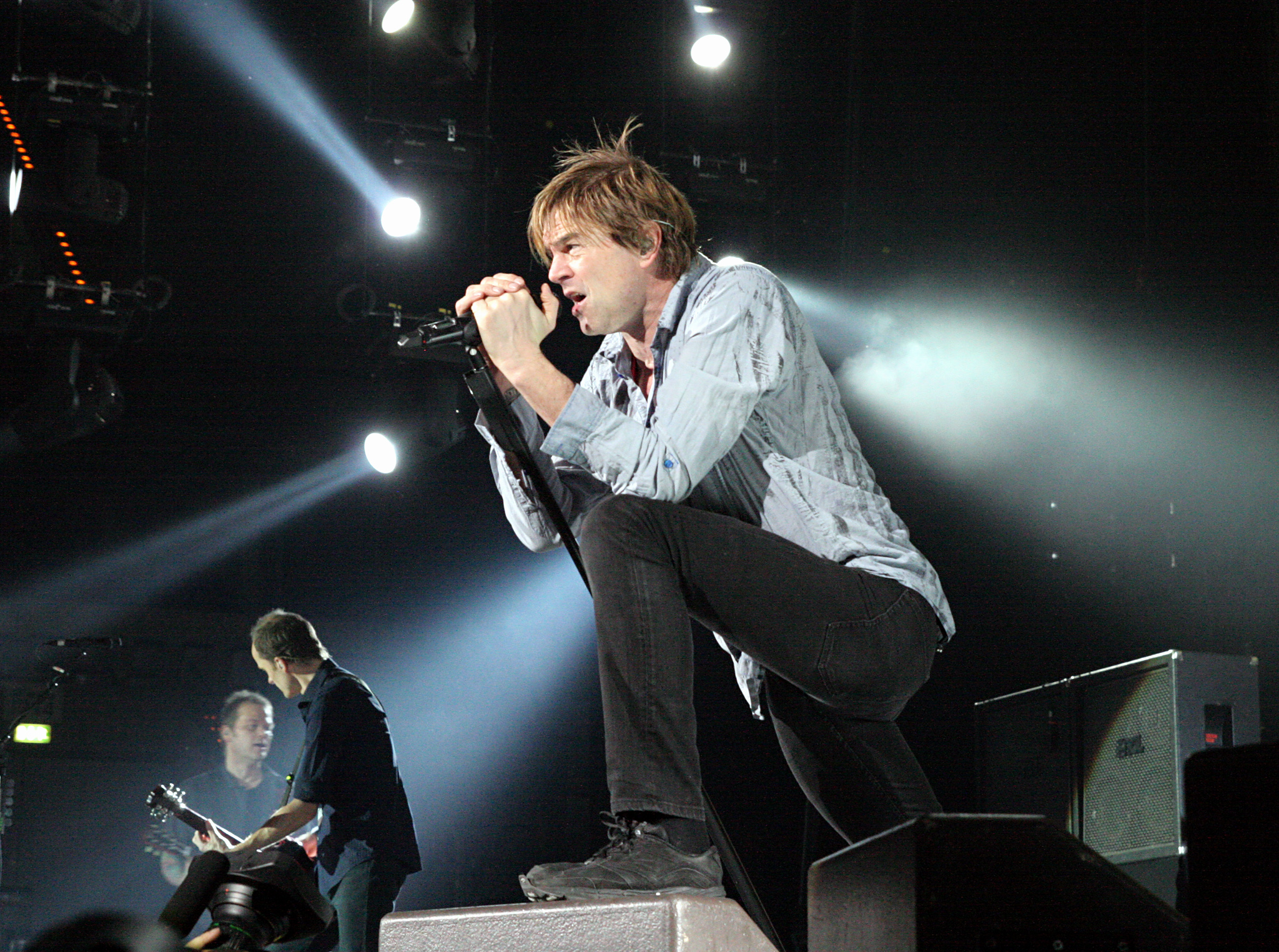
Die Toten Hosen won the most number of awards during the ceremony, including Song and Album of the Year.

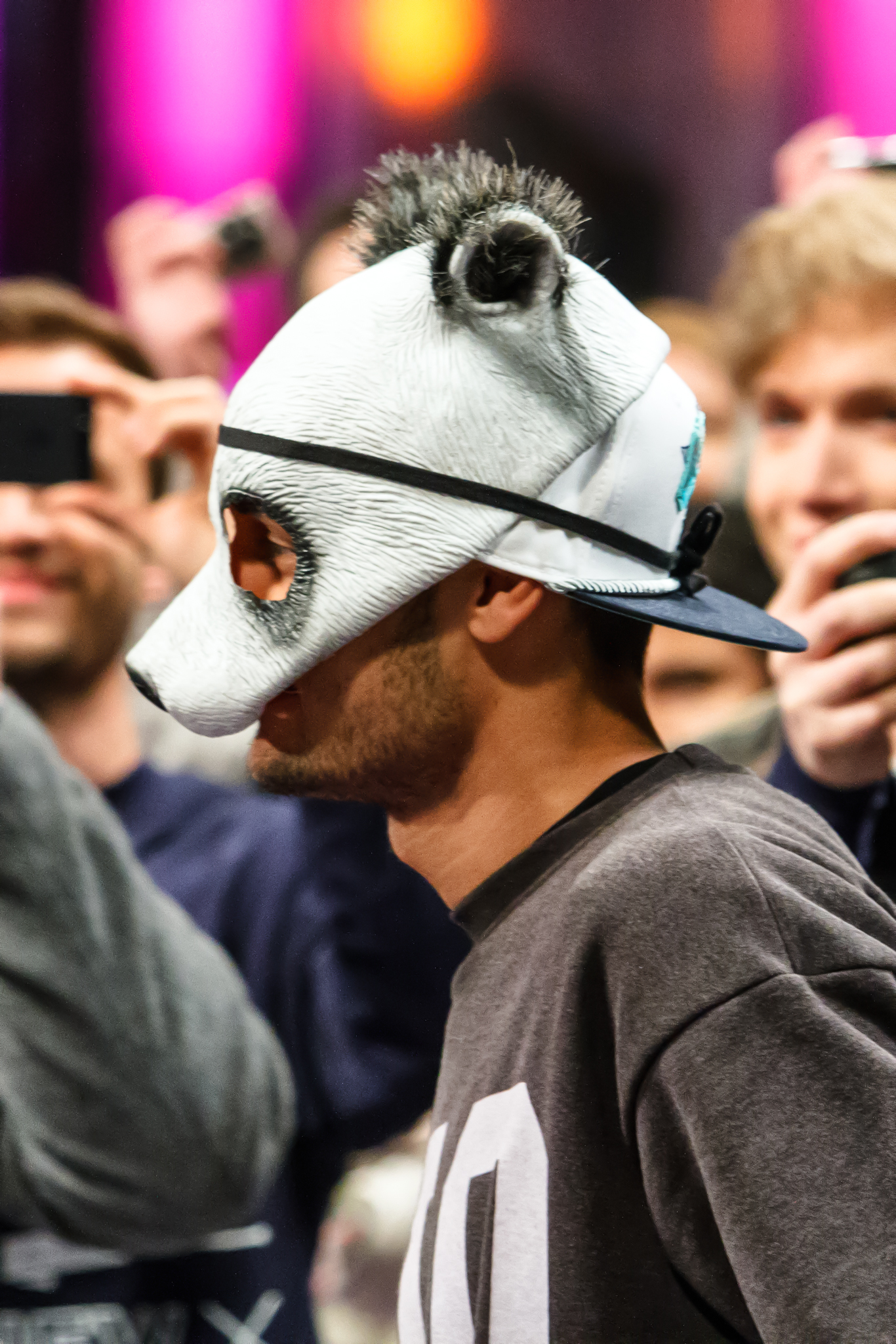
Rapper Cro received two awards of out his six nods.

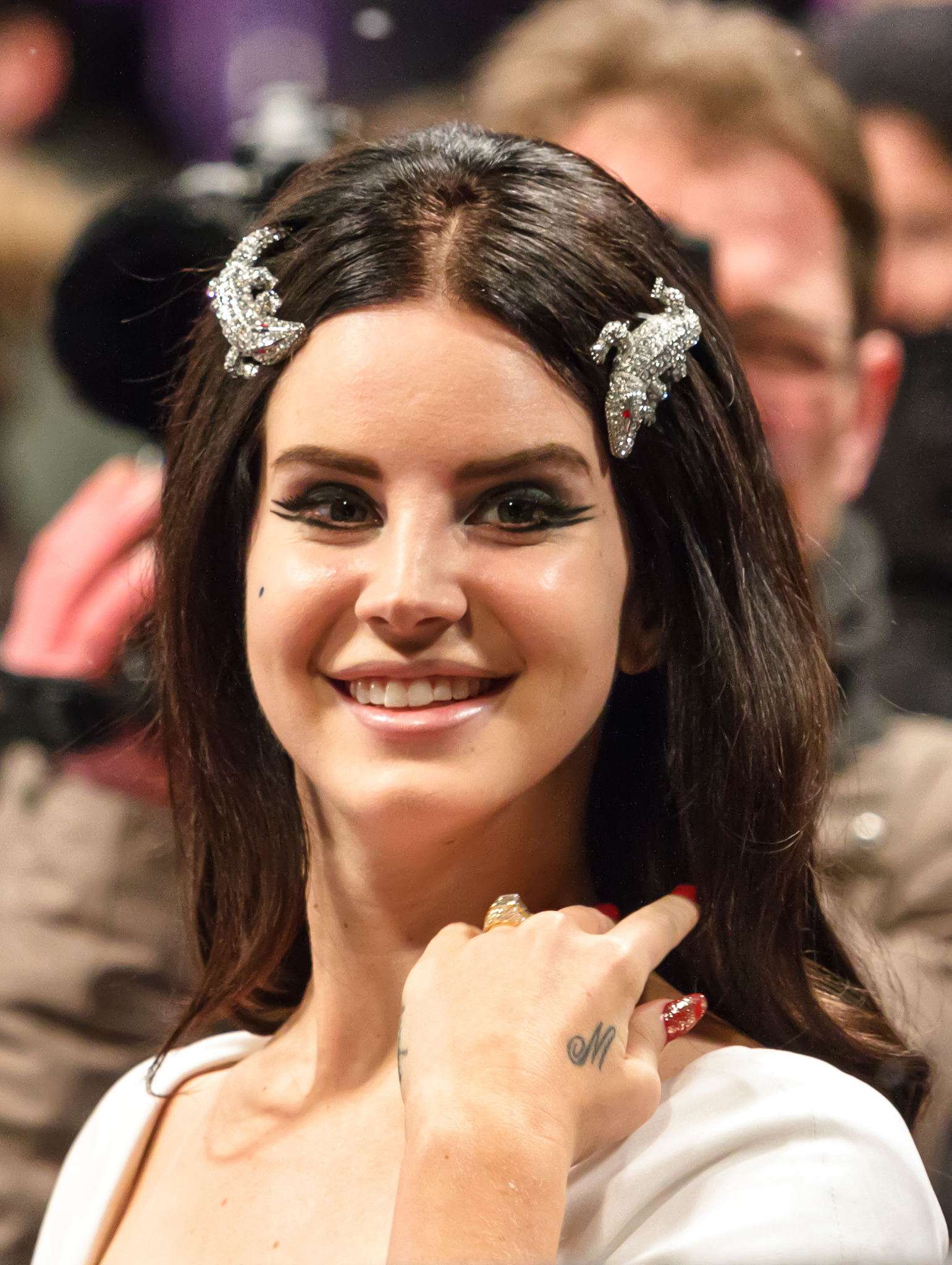
American singer Lana Del Rey was awarded Best International Newcomer and Female Rock/Pop Artist.

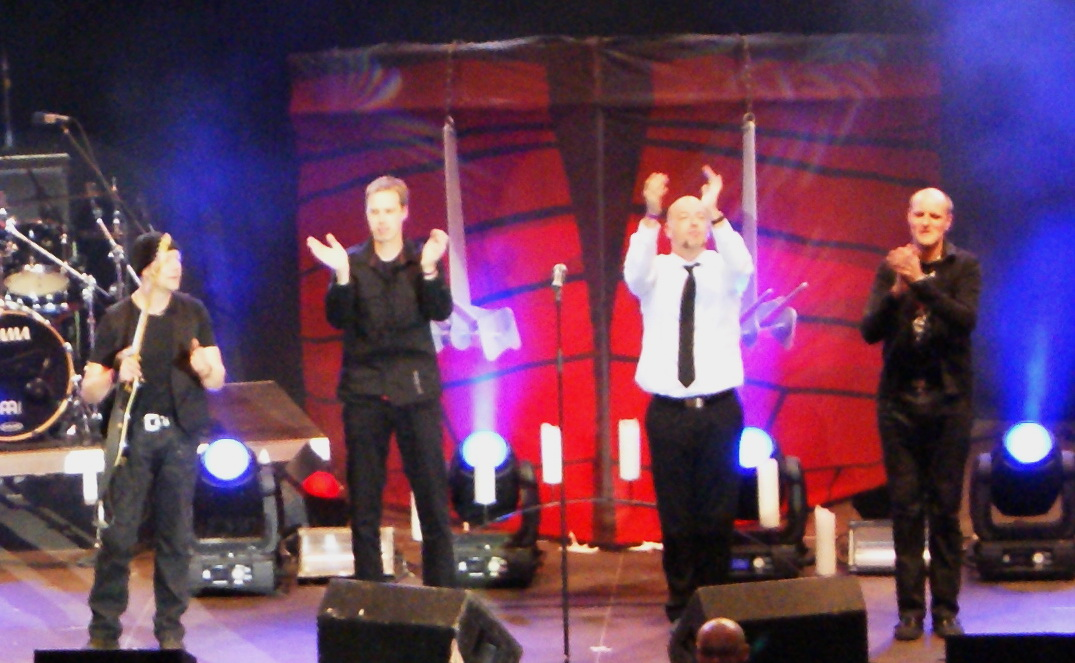
Unheilig were awarded two prizes out of five nominations.

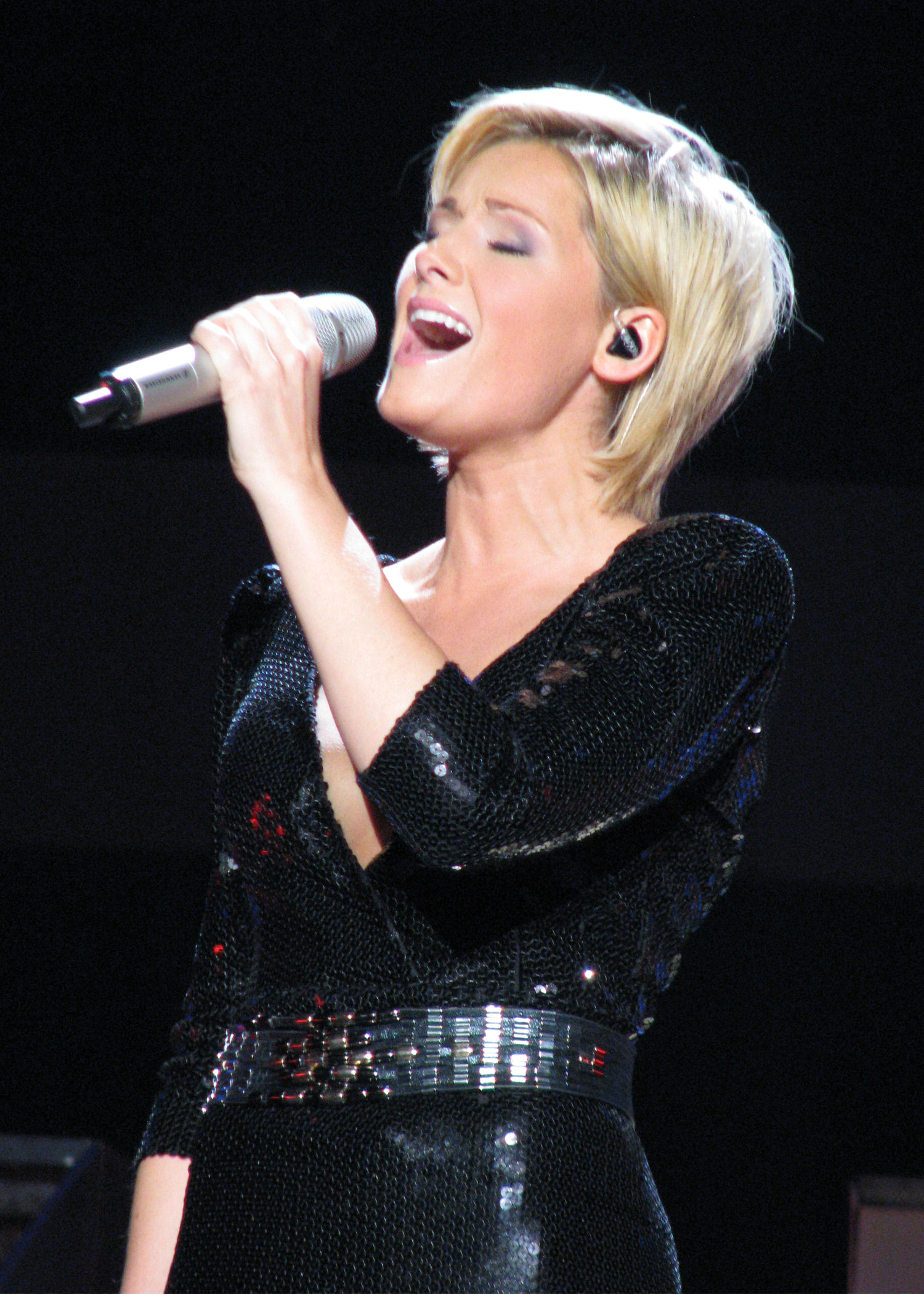
Host Helene Fischer won two Echo Awards, including Best Schlager Artist or Group.

The winners and nominees per category were (Winners are listed first and highlighted in boldface):

General
Song of the Year	Album of the Year
**Die Toten Hosen – "Tage wie diese"**; Asaf Avidan & the Mojos – "One Day / Reckoning Song"; Lykke Li – "I Follow Rivers"; Psy – "Gangnam Style"; Rihanna – "Diamonds"	**Die Toten Hosen – Ballast der Republik**; Die Ärzte – Auch; Cro – Raop; Santiano – Bis ans Ende der Welt; Unheilig – Lichter der Stadt
Best National Newcomer	Best International Newcomer
**Cro – Raop**; Mrs. Greenbird – Mrs. Greenbird; Daniele Negroni – Crazy; Ivy Quainoo – Ivy; Santiano – Bis ans Ende der Welt	**Lana Del Rey – Born to Die**; Alex Clare – The Lateness of the Hour; Luca Hänni – My Name Is Luca; Of Monsters and Men – My Head Is an Animal; Emeli Sandé – Our Version of Events
Rock/Pop
Best National Rock/Pop Male Artist	Best International Rock/Pop Male Artist
**David Garrett – Music**; Rea Garvey – Can't Stand the Silence; Heino – Mit freundlichen Grüßen; Peter Maffay – Tabaluga und die Zeichen der Zeit; Daniele Negroni – Crazy	**Robbie Williams – Take the Crown**; Joe Cocker – Fire It Up; Mark Knopfler – Privateering; Eros Ramazzotti – Noi; Bruce Springsteen – Wrecking Ball
Best National Rock/Pop Female Artist	Best International Rock/Pop Female Artist
**Ivy Quainoo – Ivy**; Mandy Capristo – Grace; Lena – Stardust; Nena – Du bist gut; Y’akoto – Babyblues	**Lana Del Rey – Born to Die**; Amy Macdonald – Life in a Beautiful Light; Katie Melua – Secret Symphony; P!nk – The Truth About Love; Emeli Sandé – Our Version of Events
Best National Rock/Pop Group	Best International Rock/Pop Group
**Die Toten Hosen – Ballast der Republik**; The BossHoss – Liberty of Action; Mrs. Greenbird – Mrs. Greenbird; PUR – Schein & Sein; Silbermond – Himmel auf	**Mumford & Sons** – Babel; Florence + the Machine – Ceremonials; Gossip – A Joyful Noise; Of Monsters and Men – My Head Is an Animal; The xx – Coexist
Rock/Alternative
Best National Rock/Alternative Group	Best International Rock/Alternative Group
**Unheilig – Lichter der Stadt**; Die Ärzte – Auch; ~~Frei.Wild~~ – ~~Feinde deiner Feinde~~; Kraftklub – Mit K; MIA. – Tacheles	**Linkin Park – Living Things**; Billy Talent – Dead Silence; Green Day – ¡Uno!; Muse – The 2nd Law; The Rolling Stones – GRRR!
Schlager/Folk
Best Schlager Artist or Group	Best Folk Artist or Group
**Helene Fischer – Für einen Tag: Live 2012**; Fantasy – Best Of: 10 Jahre Fantasy; Olaf – Wenn der Anker fällt; Matthias Reim – Unendlich; Michael Wendler – Spektakulär	**Santiano – Bis ans Ende der Welt**; Die Amigos – Bis ans Ende der Zeit; Andreas Gabalier – Volks-Rock'n'Roller Live; Michael Hirte – Liebesgrüße auf der Mundharmonika; Kastelruther Spatzen – Leben und leben lassen
Others
Best Hip Hop/Urban Artist or Group	Best Club/Dance Artist or Group
**Cro – Raop**; Max Herre – Hallo Welt!; Kollegah & Farid Bang – Jung, brutal, gutaussehend 2; Seeed – Seeed; Xavas – Gespaltene Persönlichkeit	**Deichkind – Befehl von ganz unten**; DJ Antoine – Sky Is the Limit; Fritz Kalkbrenner – Sick Travellin'; Paul Kalkbrenner – Guten Tag; Schiller – Sonne
Best Crossover Artist or Group	Best Music DVD
**Wise Guys** – Zwei Welten; Adoro – Träume; Adya – Classic 2; The Baseballs – Good Ol' Christmas; Gregorian – Epic Chants	**Helene Fischer – Für einen Tag: Live 2012**; Peter Maffay – Tabaluga und die Zeichen der Zeit; Rammstein – Videos 1995–2012; Die Toten Hosen – Noches como Estas: Live in Buenos Aires; Unheilig – Lichter der Stadt
Producer(s) of the Year	Music Video of the Year
**Die Toten Hosen**, **Vincent Sorg** – **Die Toten Hosen**; Cro – Cro; Der Graf, Brötzmann, Masbaum, Spremberg, Verlage – Unheilig; Elephant Music – Santiano; Seeed – Seeed	**Lena – "Stardust"**; Bushido – "Kleine Bushidos"; Cro – "Easy"; Die Toten Hosen – "Tage wie diese"; Y-Titty – "Der letzte Sommer"
Critic's Choice	Radio–Echo
**Kraftklub – Mit K**; Deichkind – Befehl von ganz unten; Kid Kopphausen – I; Sizarr – Psycho Boy Happy; Die Türen – ABCDEFGHIJKLMNOPQRSTUVWXYZ	**Roman Lob – "Standing Still"**; Cro – "Du"; Die Ärzte – "M&F"; Die Toten Hosen – "Tage wie diese"; Silbermond – "Himmel auf"
Lifetime Achievement Award (National)	Lifetime Achievement Award (International)
**Hannes Wader**	**Led Zeppelin**

== Artists with multiple nominations and awards ==
The following artists received multiple nominations:

- Seven: Die Toten Hosen
- Six: Cro
- Five: Unheilig
- Four: Santiano
- Three: Die Ärzte, Seeed, Silbermond
- Two: Mandy Capristo, Deichkind, Helene Fischer, Mrs. Greenbird, Max Herre, Kraftklub, Lena, Peter Maffay, Daniele Negroni, Of Monsters and Men, Ivy Quainoo, Lana Del Rey, Emeli Sandé, Xavas, Y’akoto

The following artists received multiple awards:

- Four: Die Toten Hosen
- Two: Cro, Unheilig, Lana Del Rey, Helene Fischer

== Televised ratings ==
In its original live television broadcast, the ceremony received an 11.4 share/rating among viewers aged 18–49 and was watched by 3.73 million people.
