= List of number-one hits of 2013 (Germany) =

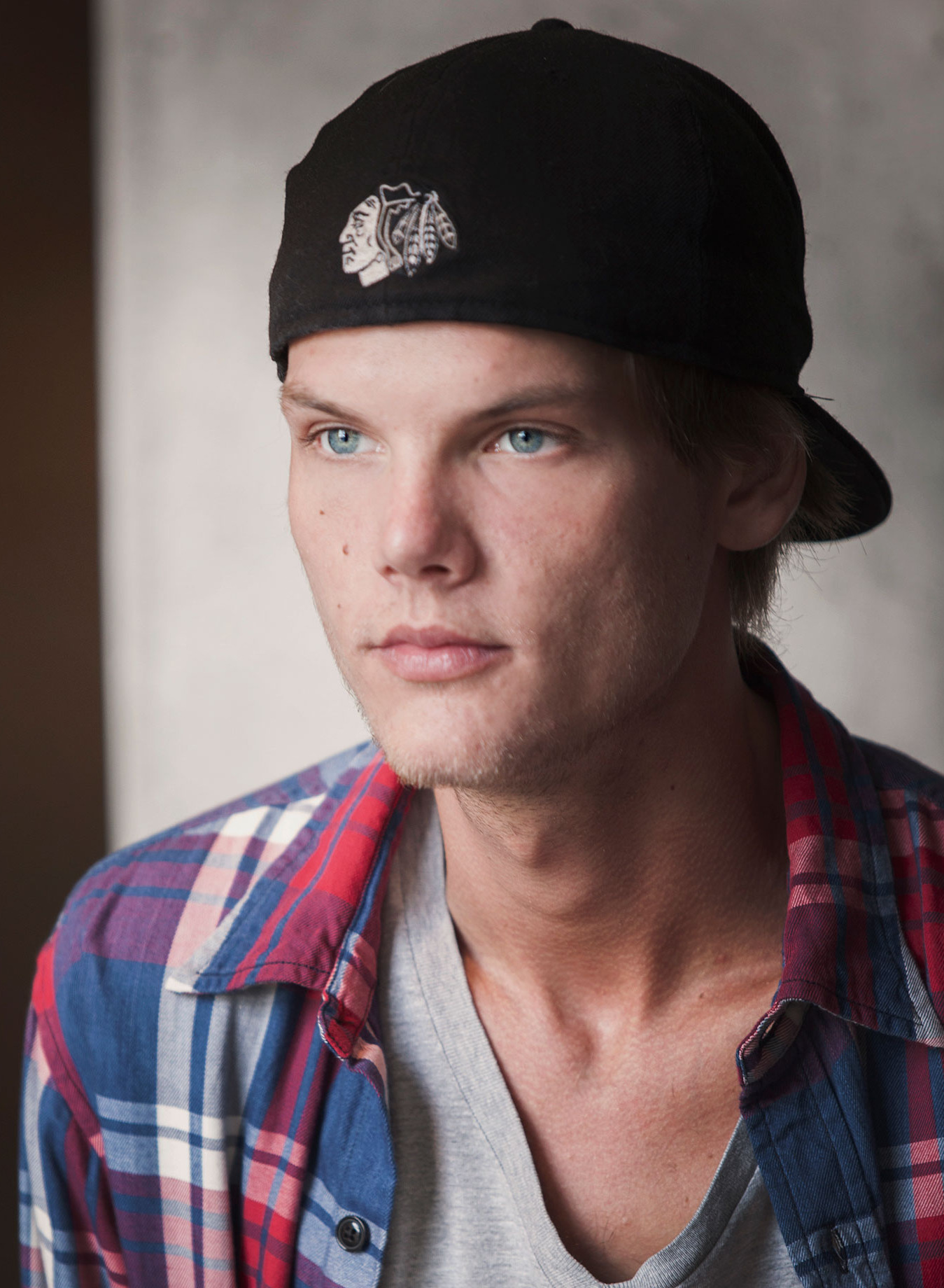
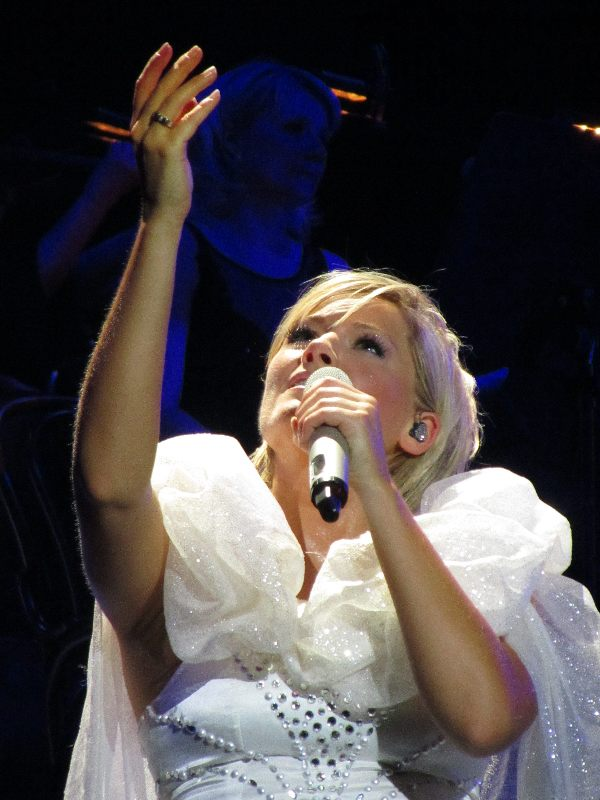
Avicii's "Wake Me Up" became the best-performing single of 2013, while Helene Fischer's "Farbenspiel" became the best-performing album of the year.

The Media Control charts are record charts compiled by Media Control on behalf of the German record industry. They include the "Single Top 100" and the "Album Top 100" chart. The chart week runs from Friday to Thursday, and the chart compilations are published on Tuesday for the record industry. The entire top 100 singles and top 100 albums are officially released the following Friday by Media Control. The charts are based on sales of physical singles and albums from retail outlets as well as permanent music downloads.

== Number-one hits by week ==
Key
†	Indicates best-performing single and album of 2013

Issue date	Song	Artist(s)	Ref.	Album	Artist(s)	Ref.
4 January	"Diamonds"	Rihanna		Mrs. Greenbird	Mrs. Greenbird	
11 January	"Gangnam Style"	Psy		Für einen Tag – Live 2012	Helene Fischer	
18 January	"Scream & Shout"	will.i.am featuring Britney Spears		Mrs. Greenbird	Mrs. Greenbird	
25 January	"Scream & Shout"	will.i.am featuring Britney Spears		Abenteuer	Andrea Berg	
1 February	"Scream & Shout"	will.i.am featuring Britney Spears		Abenteuer	Andrea Berg	
8 February	"Scream & Shout"	will.i.am featuring Britney Spears		Unendlich	Matthias Reim	
15 February	"Scream & Shout"	will.i.am featuring Britney Spears		Mit freundlichen Grüßen	Heino	
22 February	"Scream & Shout"	will.i.am featuring Britney Spears		Jung, brutal, gutaussehend 2	Kollegah and Farid Bang	
1 March	"Scream & Shout"	will.i.am featuring Britney Spears		Mit freundlichen Grüßen	Heino	
8 March	"Scream & Shout"	will.i.am featuring Britney Spears		Mit freundlichen Grüßen	Heino	
15 March	"Scream & Shout"	will.i.am featuring Britney Spears		Mit freundlichen Grüßen	Heino	
22 March	"Let Her Go"	Passenger		The Next Day	David Bowie	
29 March	"Let Her Go"	Passenger		The 20/20 Experience	Justin Timberlake	
5 April	"Let Her Go"	Passenger		Delta Machine	Depeche Mode	
12 April	"Let Her Go"	Passenger		Delta Machine	Depeche Mode	
19 April	"Let Her Go"	Passenger		Outlaw Gentlemen & Shady Ladies	Volbeat	
26 April	"Just Give Me a Reason"	Pink featuring Nate Ruess		Kompass ohne Norden	Prinz Pi	
3 May	"Just Give Me a Reason"	Pink featuring Nate Ruess		Feinde deiner Feinde	Frei.Wild	
10 May	"Safe and Sound"	Capital Cities		Now What?!	Deep Purple	
17 May	"Safe and Sound"	Capital Cities		Dann mach's gut	Reinhard Mey	
24 May	"Mein Herz"	Beatrice Egli		Mit den Gezeiten	Santiano	
31 May	"Get Lucky"	Daft Punk featuring Pharrell Williams		Random Access Memories	Daft Punk	
7 June	"Get Lucky"	Daft Punk featuring Pharrell Williams		Am seidenen Faden	Tim Bendzko	
14 June	"Blurred Lines"	Robin Thicke featuring T.I. and Pharrell		Bei meiner Seele	Xavier Naidoo	
21 June	"Blurred Lines"	Robin Thicke featuring T.I. and Pharrell		13	Black Sabbath	
28 June	"Blurred Lines"	Robin Thicke featuring T.I. and Pharrell		Im Herzen jung	Die Amigos	
5 July	"Blurred Lines"	Robin Thicke featuring T.I. and Pharrell		D.N.A	Genetikk	
12 July	"Whatever"	Cro		Liebe ist meine Religion	Frida Gold	
19 July	"Wake Me Up!"†	Avicii		Hoch 2	RAF 3.0	
26 July	"Wake Me Up!"†	Avicii		NWA (indiziert)	Shindy	
2 August	"Wake Me Up!"†	Avicii		Preachers of the Night	Powerwolf	
9 August	"Wake Me Up!"†	Avicii		Heut' ist Dein Tag	Hansi Hinterseer	
16 August	"Wake Me Up!"†	Avicii		Triebwerke	Alligatoah	
23 August	"Wake Me Up!"†	Avicii		Sommer, Sonne, Kaktus!	Helge Schneider	
30 August	"Wake Me Up!"†	Avicii		Das schwarze 1X1	Saltatio Mortis	
6 September	"Wake Me Up!"†	Avicii		Eksodus	Eko Fresh	
13 September	"Wake Me Up!"†	Avicii		Opus	Schiller	
20 September	"Wake Me Up!"†	Avicii		Atlantis	Andrea Berg	
27 September	"Talk Dirty"	Jason Derulo featuring 2 Chainz		Die Nacht der Dämonen	Die Ärzte	
4 October	"Talk Dirty"	Jason Derulo featuring 2 Chainz		Atlantis	Andrea Berg	
11 October	"Talk Dirty"	Jason Derulo featuring 2 Chainz		Hinterland	Casper	
18 October	"Bonfire Heart"	James Blunt		Farbenspiel †	Helene Fischer	
25 October	"Jubel"	Klingande		Farbenspiel †	Helene Fischer	
1 November	"Hey Brother"	Avicii		Farbenspiel †	Helene Fischer	
8 November	"Jubel"	Klingande		Rich Kidz	Prince Kay One	
15 November	"Jubel"	Klingande		The Marshall Mathers LP 2	Eminem	
22 November	"Jubel"	Klingande		The Marshall Mathers LP 2	Eminem	
29 November	"Jubel"	Klingande		Swings Both Ways	Robbie Williams	
6 December	"Jubel"	Klingande		Still	Frei.Wild	
13 December	"Jubel"	Klingande		30-11-80	Sido	
20 December	"Changes"	FAUL & Wad Ad vs. Pnau		Swings Both Ways	Robbie Williams	
27 December	"Timber"	Pitbull featuring Kesha		Swings Both Ways	Robbie Williams	

== See also ==
- List of number-one hits (Germany)
- List of German airplay number-one songs
