= Traum (Cro song) =

Single by Cro

from the album Melodie
- Released: 9 May 2014
- Genre: Pop; hip hop
- Length: 3:14
- Label: Chimperator / Groove Attack
- Songwriters: Shuko, Freedo, Cro

Cro singles chronology
"Whatever" (2013)	"Traum" (2014)	"Bye Bye" (2015)

"Traum" ("Dream") is a 2014 single by German rapper Cro. Released on 9 May 2014, it is his seventh single and the first release from his 2014 album Melodie. It was also released as a remix CD containing six tracks, including the radio single, remixes and instrumentals of the song. On 17 February 2015, Cro released an English version of the song titled "Dream" on iTunes.

== Track list ==
Single

1. "Traum" (3:17)
2. "Traum" (instrumental) (3:15)

EP Traum

1. "Traum (3:14)
2. "Traum" (instrumental) (3:14)
3. "Traum" (MRLN remix) (4:17)
4. "Traum" (Cro remix) (4:01)
5. "Traum" (MRLN remix) [instrumental] (4:17)
6. "Traum" (Cro remix) [instrumental] (4:00)

== Charts ==
=== Weekly charts ===
Chart (2014)	Peak position
Austria (Ö3 Austria Top 40)	1
Euro Digital Song Sales (Billboard)	5
Germany (GfK)	1
Luxembourg Digital Song Sales (Billboard)	3
Switzerland (Schweizer Hitparade)	1

=== Year-end charts ===
Chart (2014)	Position
Austria (Ö3 Austria Top 40)	3
Germany (Media Control Charts)	9
Switzerland (Schweizer Hitparade)	16

== Certifications ==
Region	Certification	Certified units/sales
Austria (IFPI Austria)	Gold	15,000^{*}
Germany (BVMI)	Diamond	1,000,000^{‡}
Switzerland (IFPI Switzerland)	Platinum	30,000^{^}
^{*} Sales figures based on certification alone.^{^} Shipments figures based on certification alone.^{‡} Sales+streaming figures based on certification alone.
