= Meine Zeit =

Single by Cro

from the album Raop
- Released: 1 July 2012
- Genre: Pop, rap
- Length: 3:07
- Label: Chimperator
- Songwriter(s): Cro
- Producer(s): Cro

Cro singles chronology
"King of Raop" (2012)	"Meine Zeit" (2012)	"Einmal um die Welt" (2012)

"Meine Zeit" ("My time") is the fourth single by German rapper Cro. A pop and rap song, it was produced by Cro, and the lyrics and musical composition are also attributed to him. On 1 July 2012, the music video was released. The same day, the single was released as the fourth single from his debut album Raop through Chimperator Productions.

== Track listing ==
All tracks are written by Cro

Single
No.	Title	Length
1.	"Meine Zeit"	3:07
Total length:		3:07

== Weekly charts ==
Chart	Peak position
Austria (Ö3 Austria Top 40)	69
Germany (GfK)	33
