= Kraftklub =

German band

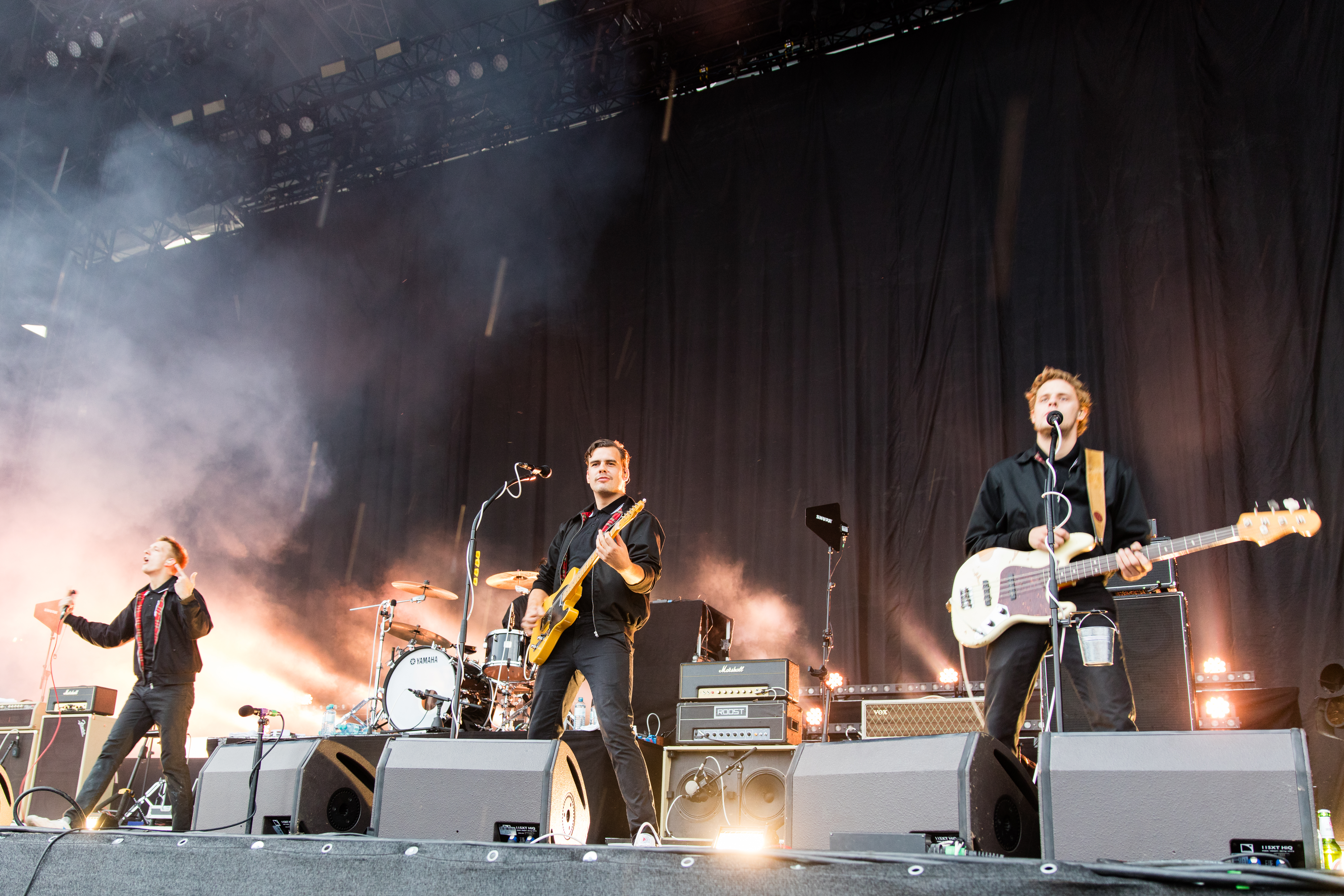
- Kraftklub performing in 2015

Background information
- Also known as: In Schwarz
- Origin: Chemnitz, Germany
- Genres: Indie rock; rap rock; garage rock revival
- Years active: 2010–present
- Label: Vertigo
- Members: Felix Brummer (Felix Kummer); Karl Schumann; Till Brummer (Till Kummer); Steffen Israel (Steffen Thiede); Max Marschk
- Website: kraftklub.to

Kraftklub are a German band from Chemnitz. Their music mixes indie rock and rap.

== History ==
Logo

=== Founding and early years (2009–2011) ===
The band members first met at school and founded the band at the end of 2009. At the Splash Festival 2009, rapper Bernd Bass (Felix Brummer) performed together with the rock band Neon Blocks for the first time. At the end of 2009, they founded the band Kraftklub and started recording their first studio album. On 13 February 2010, they released their first EP, titled Adonis Maximus at a record release party in the Chemnitz club Atomino.

In September 2010, the band won the New Music Award, a music prize awarded by various ARD radio stations. As a result, several major labels became aware of them. As of January 2011, they are signed to Universal Domestic Rock/Vertigo Berlin.

Kraftklub have performed as the support act for bands including Beatsteaks, Fettes Brot, Casper, Die Toten Hosen, and Rammstein. On 5 August 2011, they released their first single, Zu Jung.

=== Breakthrough with Mit K (2011–2013) ===
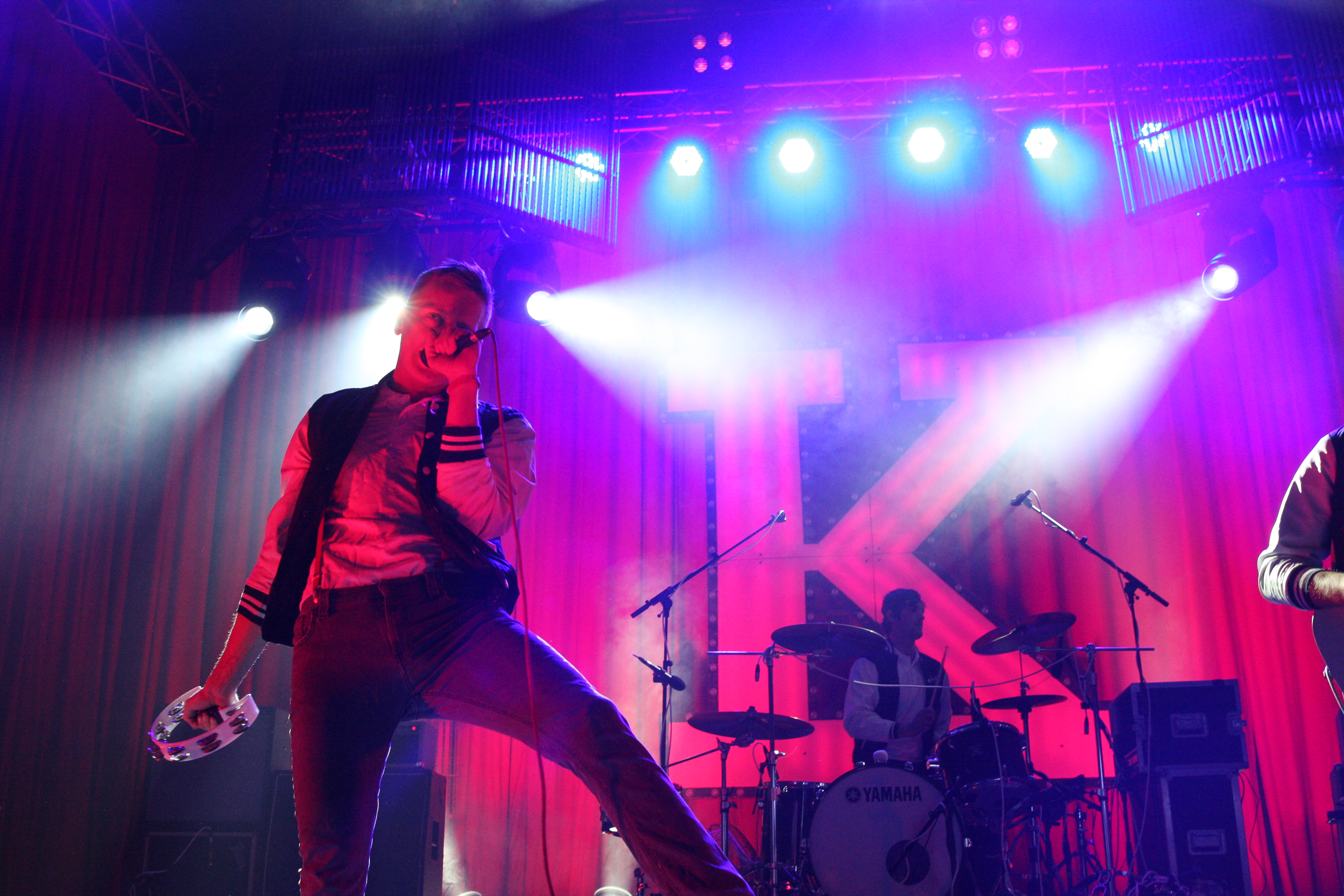
Kraftklub at Melt! Festival 2013

On 29 September 2011, the band represented Saxony in the Bundesvision Song Contest with their song Ich will nicht nach Berlin, coming fifth with a total of 89 points. The single was released the next day where it reached number 45 on the German Media Control Charts. Their debut album Mit K was released on 20 January 2012 and shot straight to number one in Germany. In April 2012, Songs für Liam, the next single from their album, was released. It debuted at number 40 and peaked at number 14 in the German Media Control Charts.

On 6 April 2012, K.I.Z and Kraftklub gave an unannounced concert on the roof of the Chemnitz commercial complex Terminal 3 as part of the documentary film series Durch die Nacht mit ... commissioned by Arte. The performance was announced only a few hours before via social networks, despite the ban on dancing on Good Friday, and as a result of the crowds of spectators the police closed off the Chemnitzer Brückenstraße.

Kraftklub refer to their hometown of Chemnitz as "Karl-Marx-Stadt" (this was the name the city was known as from 1953 to 1990) – one of their songs on Mit K is entitled Karl-Marx-Stadt – and they are known for their trademark poloshirts, varsity jackets and suspenders.

For Record Store Day 2012, Kraftklub released the song Songs for Liam in a version with Casper as vinyl single, which is limited to 700 pieces.

Its first concert outside of Germany was at 19 September 2012, in "La Puerta Grande" Bar in Bogotá, thanks to the "Kolumbien mit K" tour promoted by the Goethe Institut – Colombia, which took them by Bogotá, Medellín and Cali, each one with two concerts respectively, and one in Cartagena.

In 2013, Kraftklub was nominated (among others) together with the group Frei.Wild for the music award Echo in the category Rock/Alternative National. On 6 March 2013, Kraftklub announced that they want to be removed from the list of nominees, as Kraftklub does not want to be named in the same line as FreiWild. After MIA. and Die Ärzte also withdrew their participation, Frei.Wild was removed from the list of nominees and Kraftklub received the "Kritikerpreis National".

The song Eure Mädchen can be heard on the soundtrack of the football video game FIFA 13. It is the only German song in the game. Kraftklub has a guest appearance in the song "Ganz schön okay" on the album Hinterland by German rapper Casper.

=== In Schwarz (2014–2016) ===
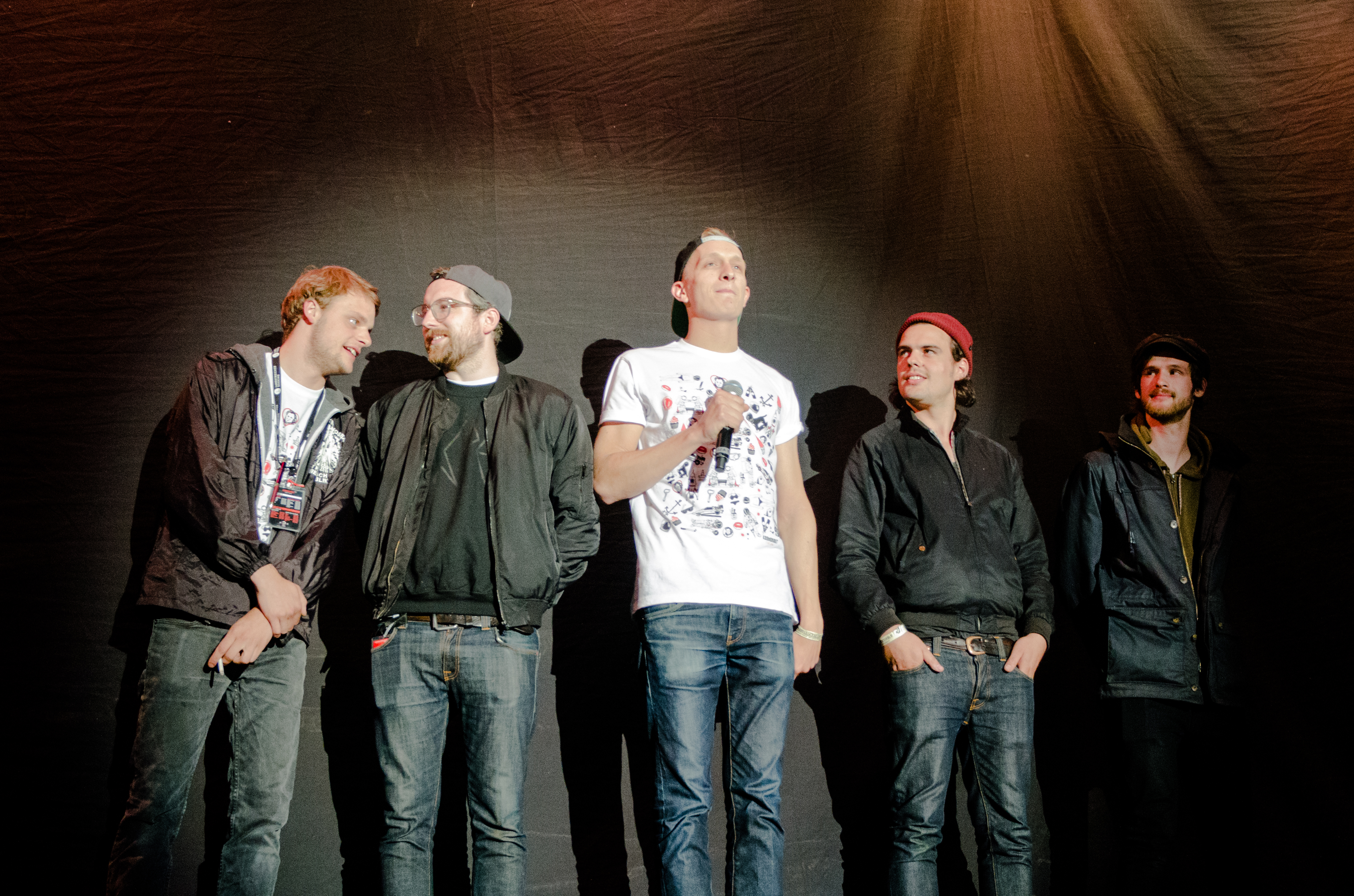
Kraftklub at Kosmonaut Festival 2014

On 20 May 2014, the music video Hand in Hand (in a version with bassist Till Brummer on vocals) of an allegedly new band called In Schwarz appeared on YouTube. The video was uploaded by the music label Audiolith Records. On 2 June 2014, In Schwarz appeared on the German television show Circus HalliGalli and revealed themselves as Kraftklub. On August 7, Kraftklub presented their second single, Unsere Fans, on MDR Sputnik.

The album In Schwarz was released on September 12, 2014. It entered the German charts at number one, and spent 18 weeks in the top 50.

In 2015, Felix Brummer and Steffen Israel began hosting "Radio Mit K" broadcast on RBB Fritz. The show later became a podcast, and continued until November 2025 when the final episode was released.

On 20 November 2015, the first live album Randale was released. Part of the DVD is a recording of the concert in the Max-Schmeling-Halle in Berlin from 6. March 2015. In January 2016 followed the Randale-tour, in which the band gave concerts in several German cities. The same year, they won the Best Narrative category with the music video Wie Ich during the Berlin Music Video Awards

=== Keine Nacht für Niemand (2017–2022) ===
On 16 March 2017, the band released the first single "Dein Lied" from the album Keine Nacht für Niemand during a ten-hour Facebook livestream. The album was released on 2 June 2017. The title of the album is an allusion to the album Keine Macht für Niemand by the band Ton Steine Scherben.

=== KARGO (2022–2025) ===
On 1 April, the band announced their new album KARGO and released the single "Ein Song reicht". The album was released on 22 September 2022. The band started their KARGO tour in November 2022 at a number of dates in Germany, one in Vienna, Austria, and one in Zurich, Switzerland.

During 2023, besides playing festivals, the band also played open air shows which took place in Cologne, twice in Berlin, Wiesbaden and Dresden. The latter was Kraftklub's biggest Headline Show to date, playing in front of over 40.000 people.

=== Sterben in Karl-Marx-Stadt (2025–present) ===
On May 28, 2025, in front of the Schauspielhaus in Chemnitz the band performed a surprise gig where they announced their new album Sterben in Karl-Marx-Stadt, performing lead single Schief in jedem Chor. The band later confirmed a tour, to complement the album, around Germany, Austria and Switzerland. The album officially released on 28 November. The album debuted at number 1 in the German and Austrian charts.

== Band members ==
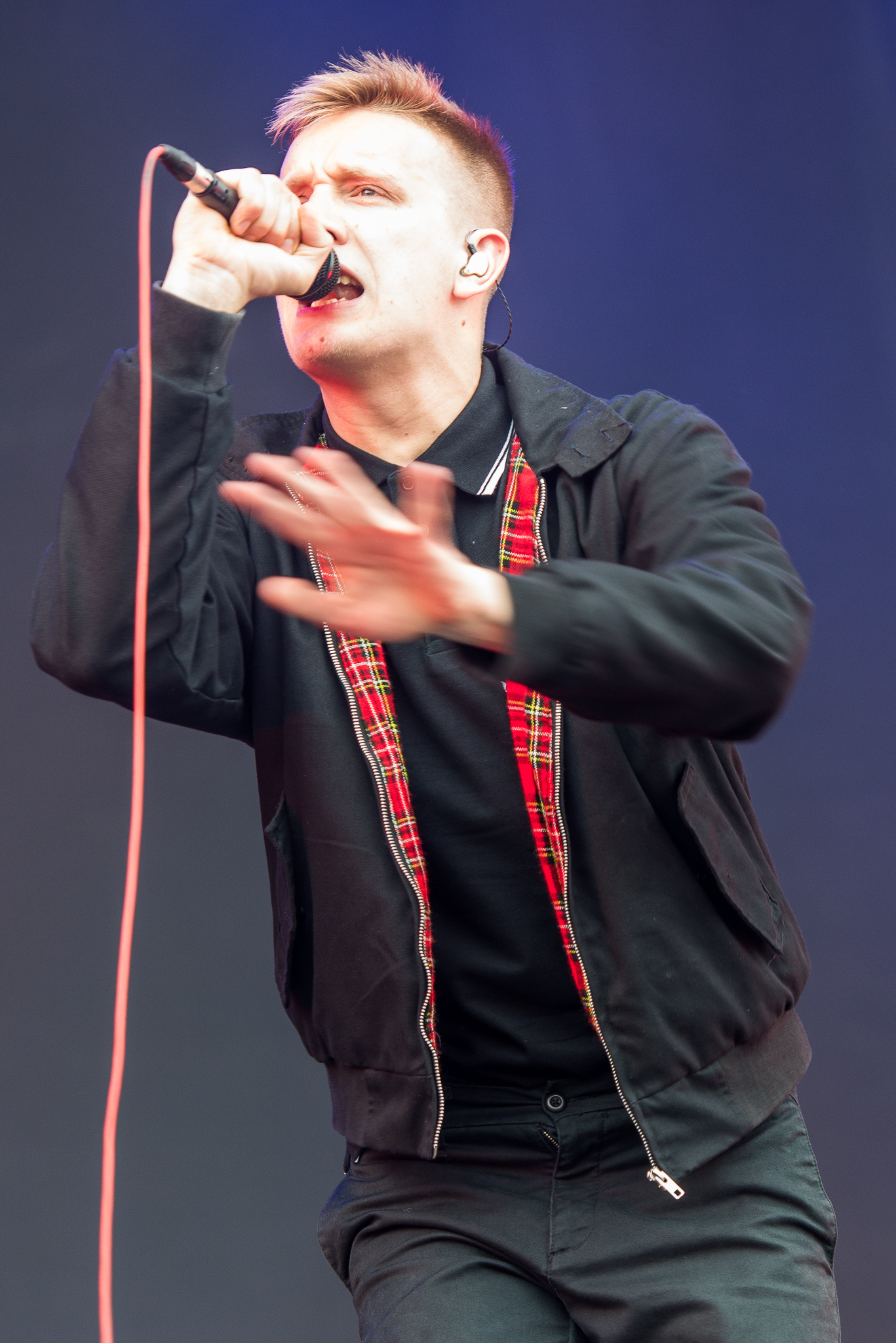
Felix Kummer (Brummer) (rap, vocals) in 2015

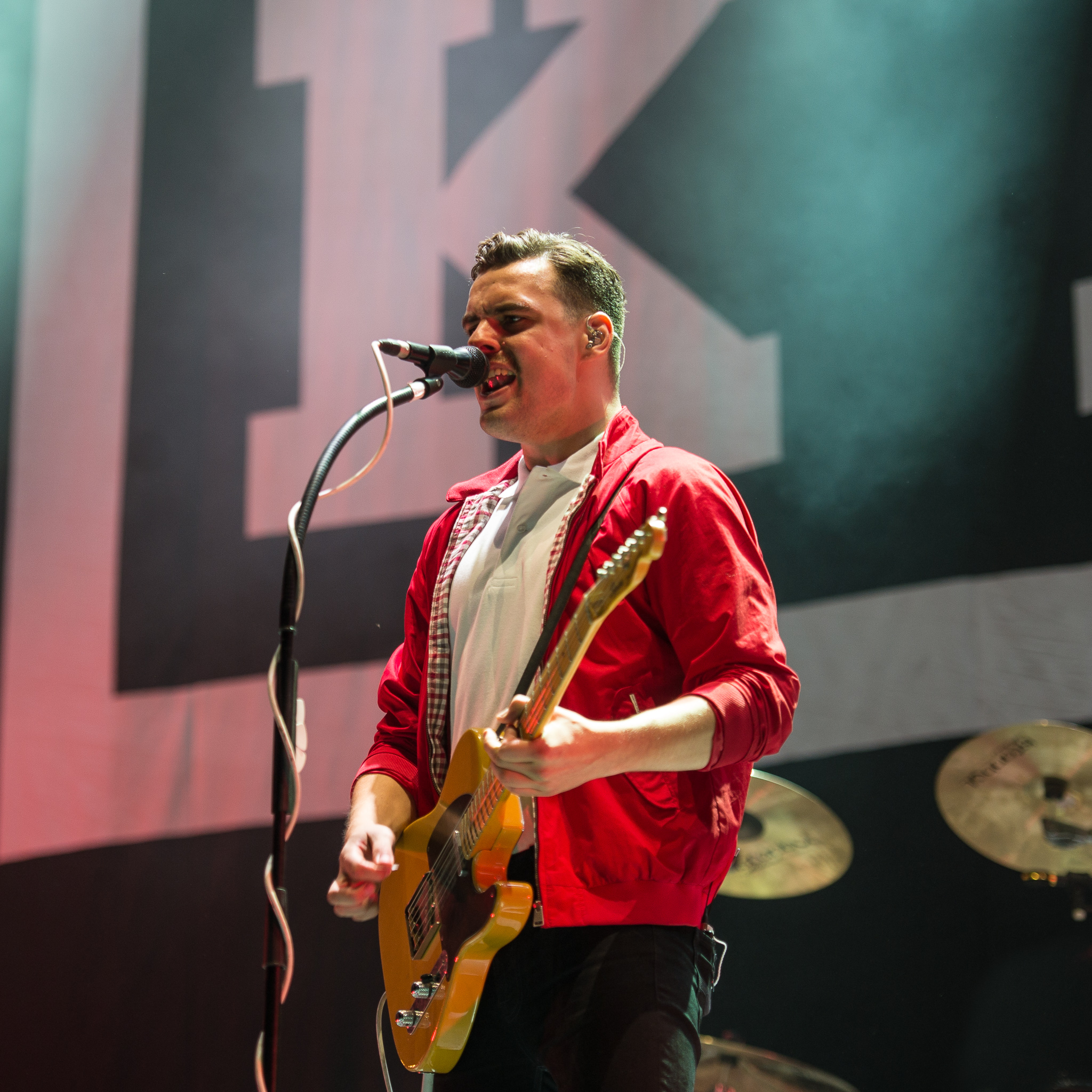
Karl Schumann (rhythm guitar, vocals) in 2017

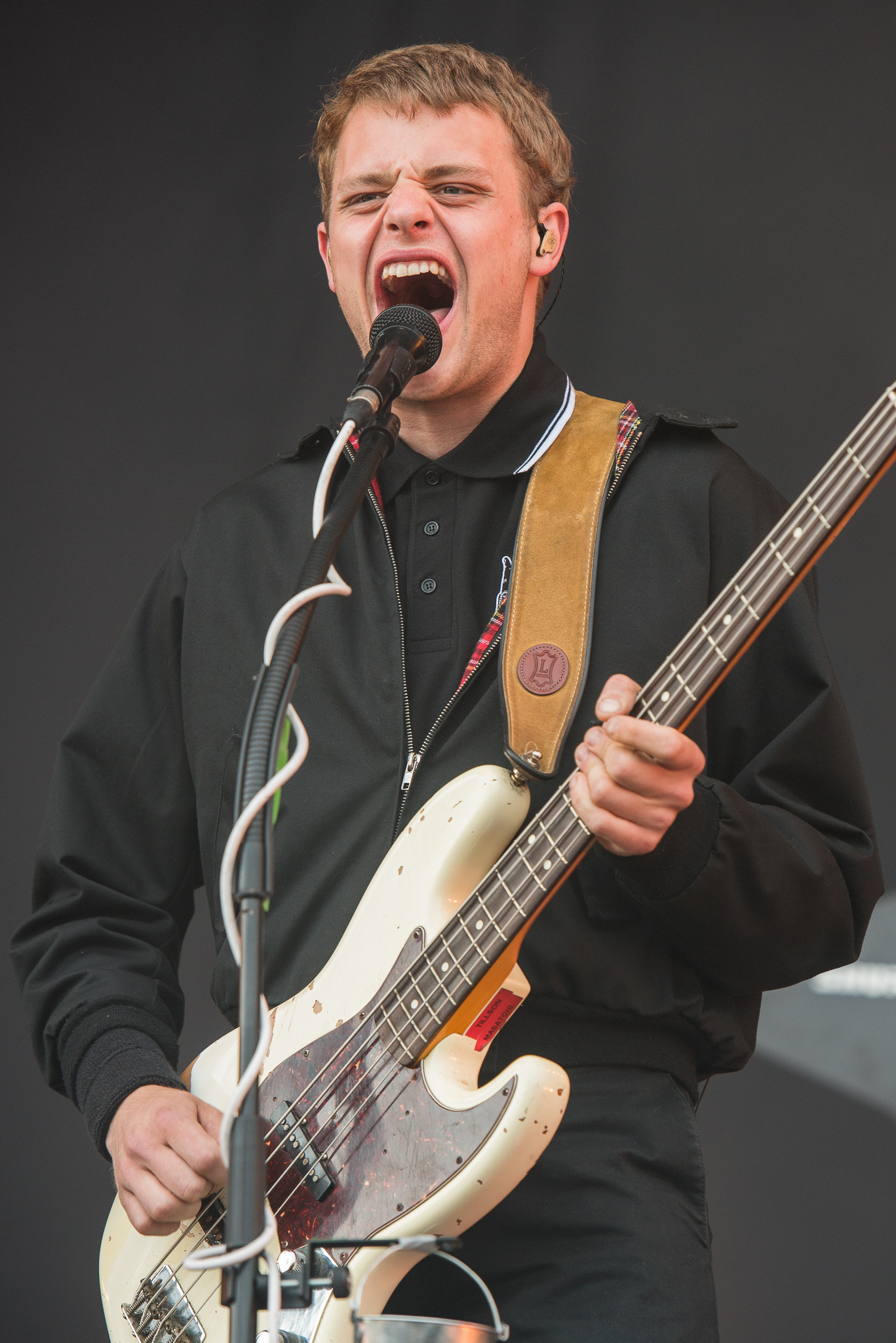
Till Kummer (Brummer)(bass) in 2015

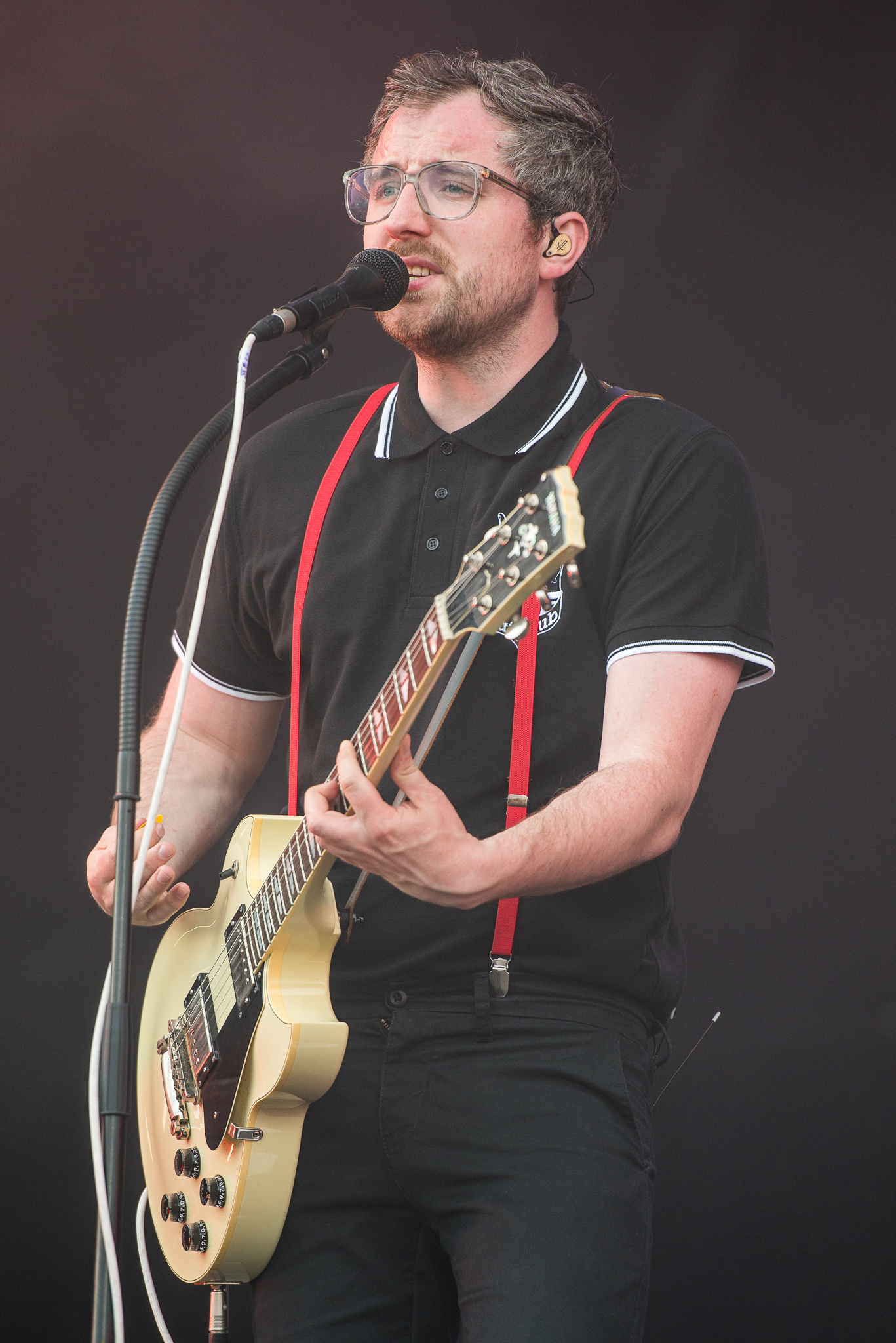
Steffen Israel (lead guitar, keys) in 2015

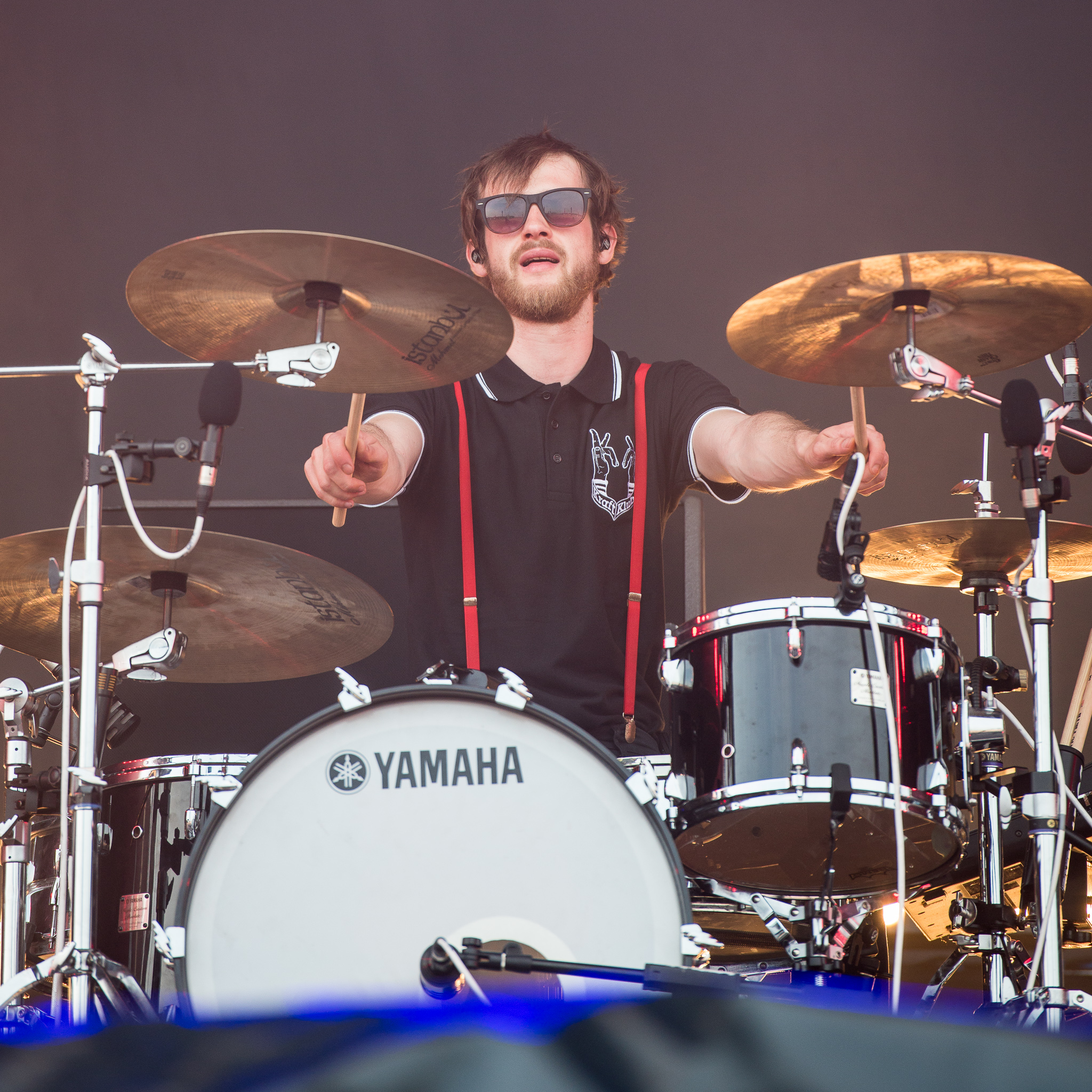
Max Marschk (drums) in 2015

Till and Felix are brothers and the sons of AG. Geige member Jan Kummer. Since there is no artistic connection to Kraftklub, the brothers use the surname Brummer instead.

Felix and Till are also the brothers of Nina and Lotta Kummer, who also perform under the band name Blond.

=== Kummer ===
Starting with the release of his first single 9010 on June 11, 2019, Felix launched his solo rap-career, performing simply under his last name Kummer. He released several singles culminating in the release of his first and only album, Kiox, named after his father's East-German record shop, which topped German charts in October 2019. It also placed 19th and 36th in Austria and Switzerland, respectively. In 2021 Felix announced the end of his solo career and released a final single "Der letzte Song (Alles wird gut)" (The Last Song (everything will be good)) featuring Fred Rabe of the band Giant Rooks. The single also hit the number one spot on the German charts in November 2021, placing 15th in Austria and 36th in Switzerland.

It is noteworthy, that his performing and last name Kummer, at the same time, is a German word meaning sorrow or grief, reflecting in some way the overall sentiment of the album, which also is the motive of the first song of the album "Nicht die Musik" (Not the music [you're looking for]) as well as the theme of the aforementioned non-album single "Der letzte Song (Alles wird gut)". Concurrently, underlined by his resolute rapping tone, he comes across as confident with having a fighting spirit, which gives most of his tracks also a positive and hopeful undertone, indicated as well in the chorus of, along with its alternative title in brackets itself, "Alles wird gut" (everything will be good).

He went on tour twice (KIOX Tour & Bye, Bye Kummer) under this name through Germany while also visiting cities in fellow German speaking countries Vienna, Austria and Zurich, Switzerland. His last two concerts as Kummer he performed in front of a sold-out audience at the Parkbühne Wuhlheide open-air venue in Berlin.

Additionally, on Kraftklub's KARGO tour (2022–present) at most of their concerts Felix performed his song "Bei dir" (With you) with the rest of the band, often while they were in the midst of the crowd for a couple of songs.

== Awards and nominations ==
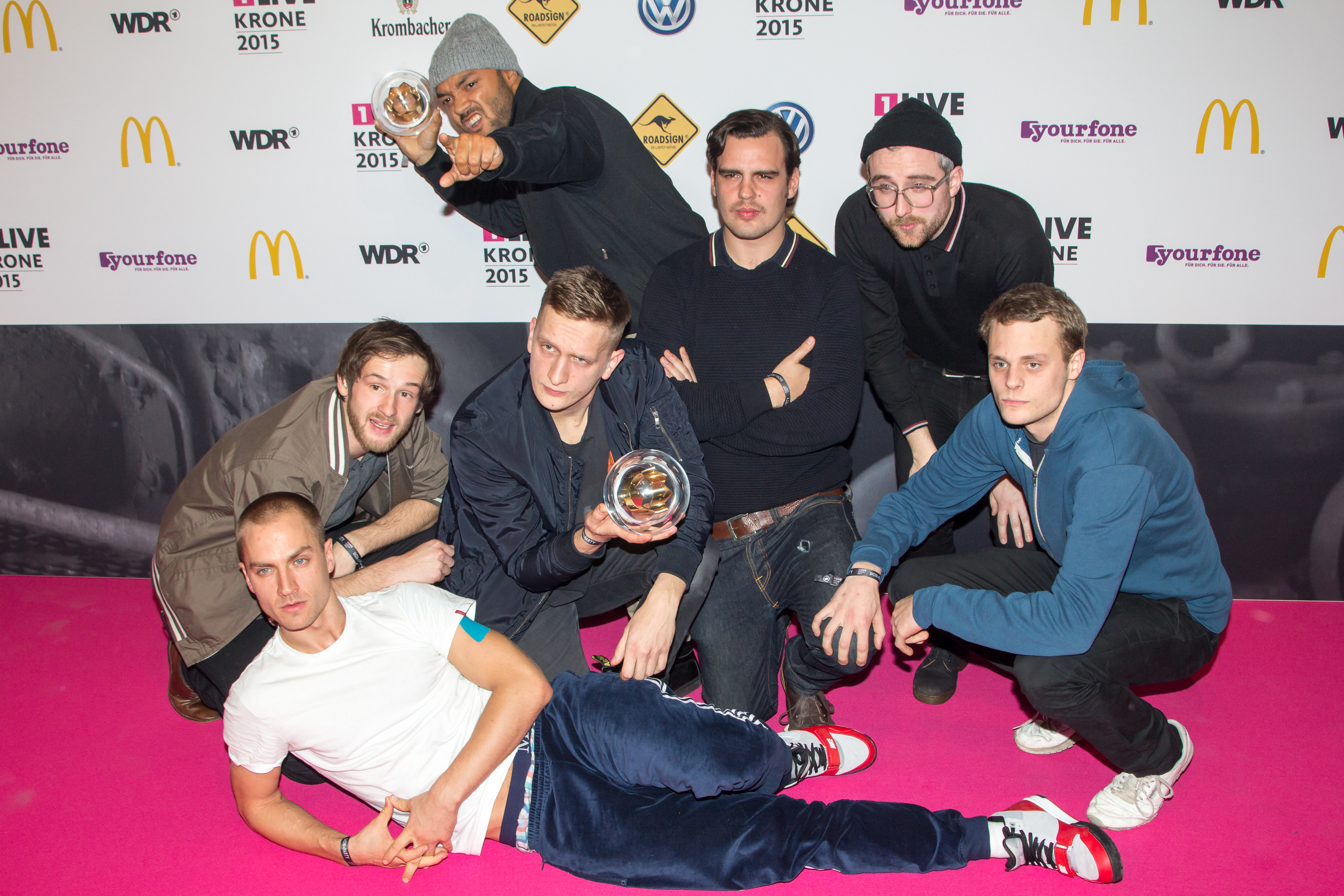
Kraftklub at the 2015 1LIVE Krone awards

Award	Year	Category	Winner	Result	Ref.
New Music Award	2010	Winner	Themselves	Won	
1LIVE Krone	2012	Best Album	Mit K	Won	
1LIVE Krone	2014	Best Band	Themselves	Won	
1LIVE Krone	2015	Best Band	Themselves	Won	
1LIVE Krone	2017	Best Band	Themselves	Won	
1LIVE Krone	2017	Best Live Band	Themselves	Won	
1LIVE Krone	2017	Best Live Band	Themselves	Won	
1LIVE Krone	2022	Best Alternative Song	Ein Song reicht	Won	
1LIVE Krone	2023	Best Live band	Themselves	Won	
Echo Music Prize	2013	Critics Award	Mit K	Won	
Echo Music Prize	2015	Best Video	Unsere Fans	Won	
Berlin Music Video Awards	2015	Best Narrative	Wie Ich	Won	
Preis für Popkultur	2018	Best Idea/Concept	Clubtausch in Köln	Won	

== Discography ==
=== Albums ===
- 2012: Mit K
- 2014: In Schwarz
- 2015: Randale (live album)
- 2017: Keine Nacht für Niemand
- 2022: KARGO
- 2025: Sterben in Karl-Marx-Stadt

=== EPs ===
- 2010: Adonis Maximus
- 2012: Live im Astra Berlin
- 2012: Songs für Liam

=== Singles ===
- 2011: "Zu jung"
- 2011: "Ich will nicht nach Berlin"
- 2011: "Eure Mädchen"
- 2012: "Songs für Liam"
- 2012: "Kein Liebeslied"
- 2012: "Mein Leben"
- 2014: "Hand in Hand"
- 2014: "Unsere Fans"
- 2014: "Wie ich"
- 2014: "Schüsse in die Luft"
- 2015: "Blau"
- 2015: "Alles wegen dir"
- 2017: "Dein Lied"
- 2017: "Fenster"
- 2017: "Sklave"
- 2017: "Chemie Chemie Ya"
- 2017: "Am Ende"
- 2018: "Liebe zu Dritt"
- 2022: "Ein Song reicht"
- 2022: "Wittenberg ist nicht Paris"
- 2022: "Fahr mit mir (4x4)" feat. Tokio Hotel
- 2022: "Teil dieser Band"
- 2022: "Blaues Licht"
- 2025: “Schief in jedem Chor”
- 2025: "Wenn ich tot bin, fang ich wieder an"
- 2025: "Unsterblich sein (*)" feat. Domiziana
- 2025: "Marlboro Mann"

=== Song appearances ===
- "Eure Mädchen" from EA Sports' FIFA 13 soundtrack (2012)
