= King of Raop =

Single by Cro

from the album Raop
- Released: 30 June 2012
- Genre: Pop, rap
- Length: 3:09
- Label: Chimperator
- Songwriter(s): Cro
- Producer(s): Jopez

Cro singles chronology
"Du" (2012)	"King of Raop" (2012)	"Meine Zeit" (2012)

"King of Raop" is the third single by German rapper Cro. A pop and rap song, it was produced by Jopez. The lyrics and musical composition are attributed to Cro. On 30 June 2012, the music video was released. The same day, the single was released on as the third single from his debut album Raop through Chimperator Productions.

== Track listing ==
All tracks are written by Cro

Single
No.	Title	Length
1.	"King of Raop"	3:09
Total length:		3:09

== Weekly charts ==
Chart	Peak position
Austria (Ö3 Austria Top 40)	63
Germany (GfK)	24
