= Frei.Wild =

German rock band from South Tirol, Italy

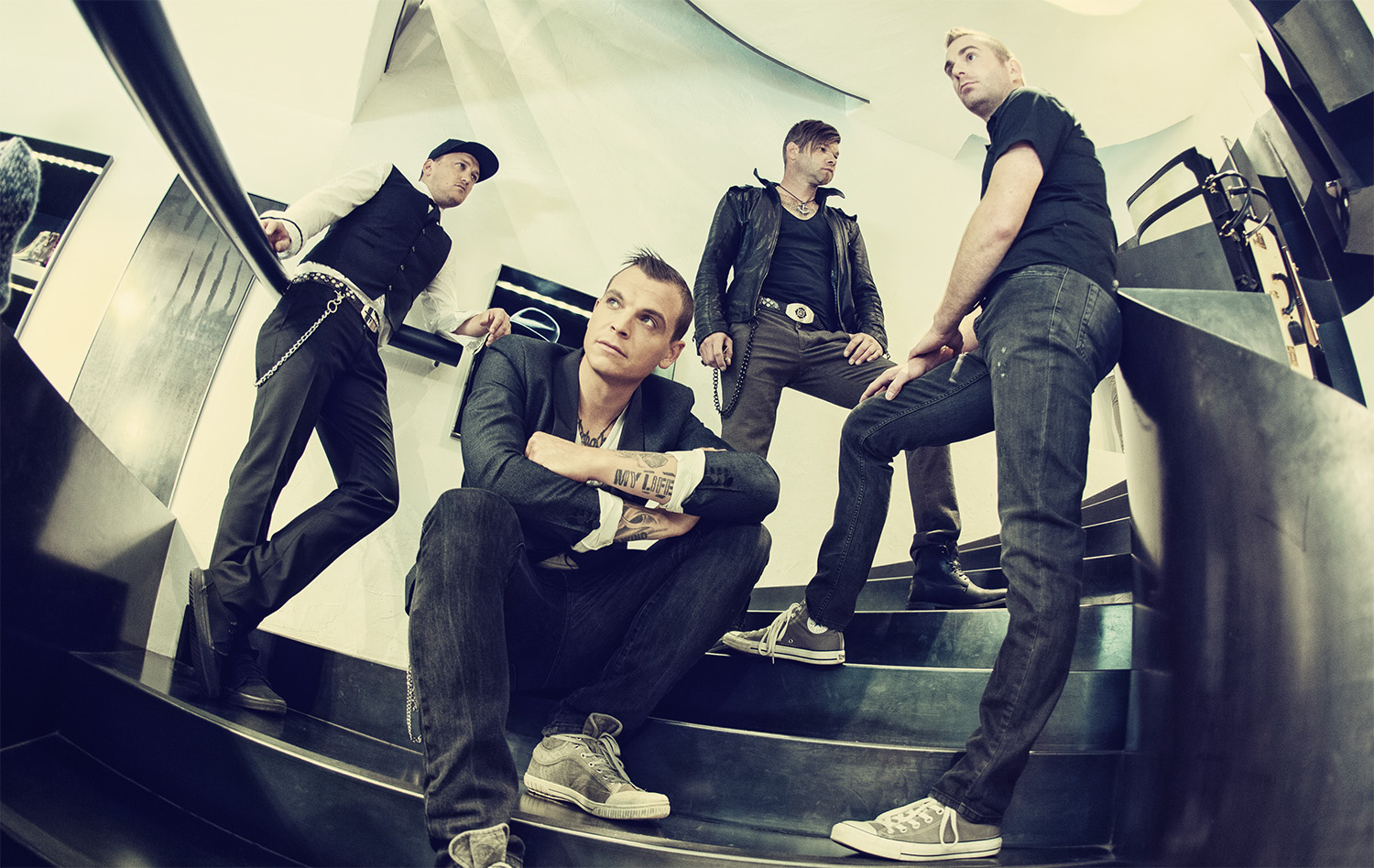
- Frei.Wild (2013)

Background information
- Origin: Brixen, South Tyrol, Italy
- Genres: German rock, hard rock
- Years active: 2001–present
- Labels: Razorwire, Asphalt, Rookies & Kings
- Members: Philipp Burger; Jonas Notdurfter; Jochen Gargitter; Christian Fohrer
- Website: frei-wild.net

Frei.Wild (pronounced FRY-vilt, the word Frei translates to "free" and the word Wild translates to "wild") is an Italian rock band from Brixen, South Tyrol, Italy. Its members belong to the German-speaking population of South Tyrol and their songs are mostly in German.

== History ==
Frei.Wild was founded in September 2001 by Philipp Burger (vocals, guitar) and Jonas Notdurfter (guitar). Jochen Gargitter (“Zegga”) joined as bassist and Christian Fohrer (“Föhre”) as drummer shortly afterwards. In their early years, the band cited German language rock acts such as Böhse Onkelz and Rammstein as musical influences.

The band’s debut album Eines Tages was released in 2002, followed by Wo die Sonne wieder lacht in 2003. Their third studio album, Mensch oder Gott, appeared in 2004. After changing record labels, the band released Mitten ins Herz in 2006. In 2007, Frei.Wild released the live DVD Von Nah und Fern, followed by the studio album Gegen alles, gegen nichts in 2008.

In 2009, the band founded the independent label Rookies & Kings and released the album Hart am Wind. Their 2010 album Gegengift reached number two on the German album charts and earned the band a nomination for Best National Rock/Alternative Group at the 2011 Echo Awards.

The 2012 album Feinde deiner Feinde also reached number two on the German charts and received a nomination for the 2013 Echo Awards. Following public controversy surrounding the nomination, the band was temporarily removed from the awards.

In May 2013, the gold edition of Feinde deiner Feinde became the band’s first number one album in Germany.

Their ninth studio album, Still, featuring primarily acoustic reinterpretations of earlier songs, entered the German album charts at number one in December 2013.

In November 2025, Frei.Wild released their eighteenth studio album Immer unter Feuer via Rookies & Kings. The album debuted at number one on the German album charts, becoming the band’s eighth number one album in Germany.

The release was accompanied by an arena tour across Germany, Austria and Switzerland in 2026.

Frei.Wild is also closely associated with the annual Alpen Flair Festival in South Tyrol, which was initiated by the band and has grown into a major music festival in South Tyrol.

== Criticism ==
Before founding Frei.Wild, Philipp Burger had been active in the right wing extremist skinhead scene during his youth in the 1990s and was a member of the band Kaiserjäger. Burger later stated in interviews that he no longer identifies with those political views. In 2008, Burger was associated with the right-wing party Die Freiheitlichen for several months, although he later stated that he had never officially been a member.

Their songs Südtirol (South Tyrol) and Wahre Werte (True Values) are often criticised as promoting nationalism. Südtirol contains the lines "Kurz gesagt, ich dulde keine Kritik an diesem heiligen Land, das unsre Heimat ist, (...) Südtirol, du bist noch nicht verlorn, in der Hölle sollen deine Feinde schmorn." ("To make it short: I don't tolerate any criticism on this holy country, that is our home, (...) South Tyrol, you aren't lost yet, in hell your enemies shall burn."). The chorus of Wahre Werte includes the lines "Wann hört ihr auf, eure Heimat zu hassen? Wenn ihr euch Ihrer schämt, dann könnt ihr sie doch verlassen, (...) Sprache, Brauchtum und Glaube sind Werte der Heimat, ohne sie gehen wir unter, stirbt unser kleines Volk" ("When are you going to stop to hate your home country? If you are ashamed of it, you can leave it, (...) Language, tradition and belief are values of the home country, without them we will perish, our small nation will die."). The band often defends these lines by pointing out the history of the German population in South Tyrol, explaining that the lines must be understood in the context of italianization.

Frei.Wild were nominated for the 2013 Echo Awards as Best National Rock/Alternative Group for their album Feinde deiner Feinde, based on the number of records they had sold. Kraftklub and MIA., who were nominated in the same category, protested in response and asked to be removed from the nomination list. In reaction, Frei.Wild were excluded from the awards in order to avoid that the event would be overshadowed by a political debate.
In February 2014, Frei.Wild were nominated as Best National Rock/Alternative Group for the 2014 Echo Awards again due to the commercial success of the album Still. An ethical review committee, which had been created by the Echo's organizers in response to the public criticism to Frei.Wild's nomination in 2013, approved the band. After the controversy surrounding the 2013 Echo Awards, Frei.Wild later won the award for Best National Rock/Alternative Group in 2016.

== Discography ==
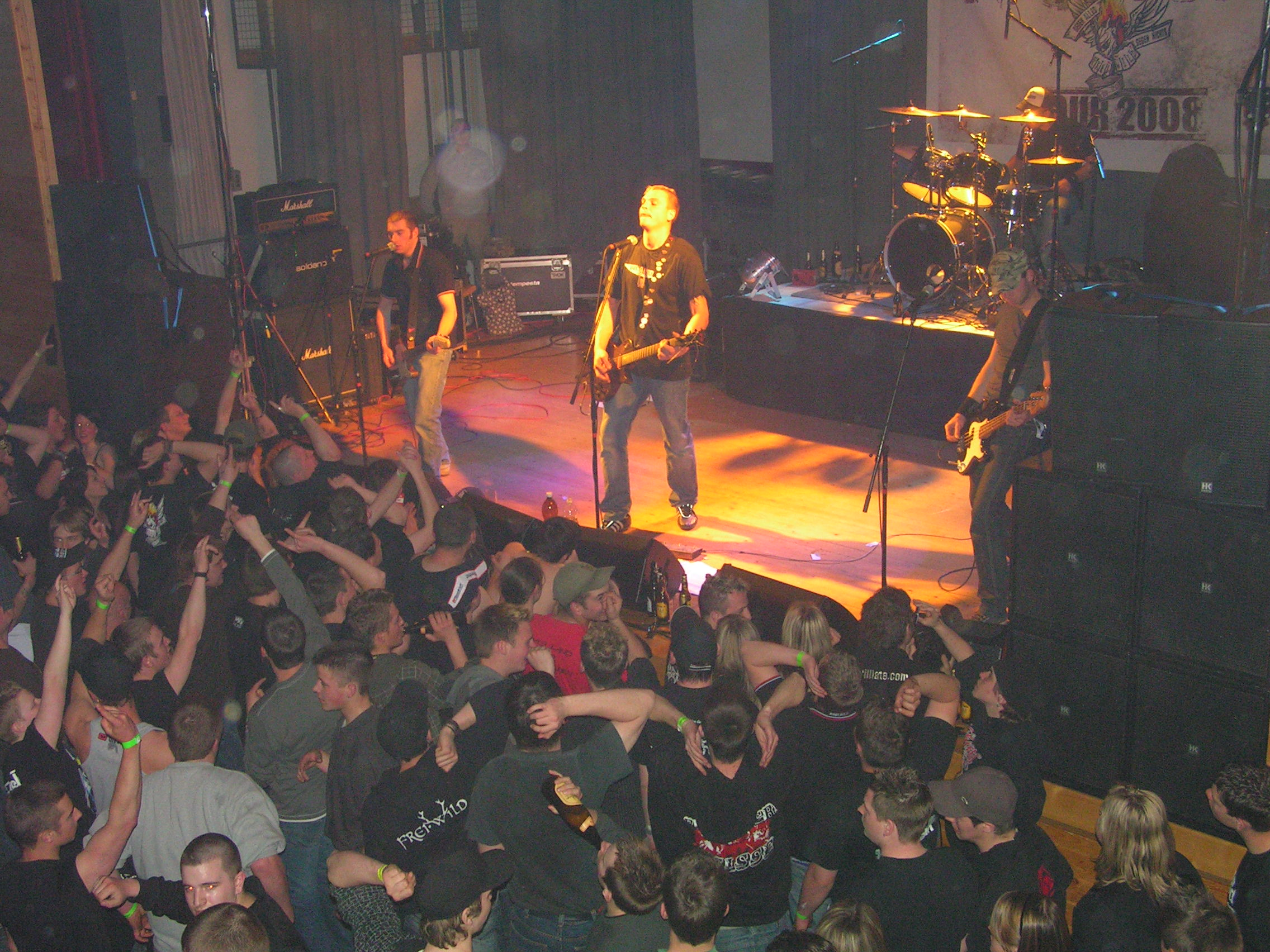
Frei.Wild performing in 2008

=== Albums ===
==== Studio albums ====
- Eines Tages (2002)
- Wo die Sonne wieder lacht (2003)
- Mensch oder Gott (2004)
- Mitten ins Herz (2006)
- Gegen alles, gegen nichts (2008)
- Hart am Wind (2009)
- Gegengift (2010)
- Feinde deiner Feinde (2012)
- Still (2013)
- Opposition (2015)
- 15 Jahre Deutschrock & SKAndale (2016)
- Rivalen und Rebellen (2018)
- Still II (2019)
- Corona Quarantäne Tape (2020)
- Corona Tape II (2020)
- 20 Jahre, Wir schaffen Deutsch.Land (2021)
- Immer Unter Feuer (2025)

==== Live albums ====
- Von nah und fern (2007)
- Händemeer (2011)
- Die Welt brennt – Live in Stuttgart (2012)
- Auf stiller Fahrt (2014)
- Live in Frankfurt: Unfassbar, unvergleichbar, unvergesslich (2014)
- 15 Jahre mit Liebe, Stolz & Leidenschaft (2016)
- Rivalen und Rebellen – Live & More (2018)

=== Singles ===
- Das Land der Vollidioten (2009)
- Sieger stehen da auf, wo Verlierer liegen bleiben (2010)
- Dieses Jahr holen wir uns den Pokal (2010)
- Allein nach vorne (2010)
- Weil du mich nur verarscht hast (2011)
- Feinde deiner Feinde (2012)
- Tot und doch am Leben (2012)
- Mach dich auf (2012)
- Wer nichts weiß, wird alles glauben (2012)
- Zieh mit den Göttern (2012)
- Unendliches Leben (2012)
- Verdammte Welt (2013)
- Stille Nacht (2013)
- Wir brechen eure Seelen (2014)
- Unvergessen, unvergänglich, lebenslänglich (2015)
- Wie ein schützender Engel (2015)
- Macht euch endlich alle platt (2017)
- Rivalen und Rebellen (2017)
- Antiwillkommen (2017)
- Herz schlägt Herz (2017)
- Und ich war wieder da (2018)
- Der Teufel trägt Geweih (2019)
- Die Liebe mich zu hassen (2019)
- Sommerland (2019)
- Blinde Völker wie Armeen (2019)
- Keine Lüge reicht je bis zur Wahrheit (2019)
- Corona Weltuntergang (2020)
- Alles, alles was mir fehlt (2020)
- Wir gehen Dir ewig auf die Eier (2020)
- Nur das Leben in Freiheit (2020)
- Hier rein da raus Freigeist (2020)
- Renne, brenne, Himmelstürmer (2020)
- Ich weiss wer ich war (2020)
- Wo geht es hin wo bleiben wir stehen (2020)
- Engel über dem Himmel (2020)
- Spirit of 1996 (2020)
- Corona Weltuntergang V2 (2020)
- Krieg ohne Sieger (2021)
- Frohe Weihnacht, Buon Natale, Merry Christmas (2021)

== Awards ==
Year	Awards	Category	Result
2011	Echo	Best National Rock/Alternative Group	Nominated
2013	Echo	~~Best National Rock/Alternative Group~~	Nominated
2014	Echo	Best National Rock/Alternative Group	Nominated
2015	Echo	Best Music DVD	Nominated
2016	Echo	Best National Rock/Alternative Group	Won
2017	Echo	Best Rock national	Nominated
