= Whatever (Cro song) =

Single by Cro

from the album Raop +5
- Released: 28 June 2013
- Genre: Pop, hip hop
- Length: 3:14
- Label: Chimperator / Groove Attack
- Songwriter: Cro
- Producer: Cro

Cro singles chronology
"Einmal um die Welt" (2012)	"Whatever" (2013)	"Traum" (2014)

"Whatever" is a 2013 single by German rapper Cro and his first single that topped the German singles chart. The lighthearted song was very popular in the German market, receiving upwards of 40 million views on YouTube as of July 2016. Released on 28 June 2013, it is his sixth single and is found on the 2013 EP Whatever.

== Track listing ==
Maxi single

1. "Whatever" (3:11)
2. "Whatever" (instrumental) (3:11)

Whatever EP

1. "Whatever" (3:11)
2. "Chillin" (4:32)
3. "Bei dir" (2:20)
4. "Ab jetzt" (2:49)

== Charts ==
=== Weekly charts ===
Chart (2013)	Peak position
Austria (Ö3 Austria Top 40)	3
Germany (GfK)	1
Switzerland (Schweizer Hitparade)	6

=== Year-end charts ===
Chart (2013)	Position
Austria (Ö3 Austria Top 40)	21
Germany (Media Control AG)	25

== Certifications ==
Region	Certification	Certified units/sales
Austria (IFPI Austria)	Gold	15,000^{*}
Germany (BVMI)	Platinum	300,000^{^}
Switzerland (IFPI Switzerland)	Gold	15,000^{^}
^{*} Sales figures based on certification alone.^{^} Shipments figures based on certification alone.
