= Melodie (album) =

Studio album by Cro
- Released: 6 July 2014
- Genre: Rap, pop
- Length: 46:56
- Label: Chimperator
- Producer: Cro, Shuko, Freedo, Michael Geldreich, Peet

Cro chronology
Raop (2012)	Melodie (2014)	tru. (2017)

Singles from Melodie
- 1. "Traum" Released: 9 May 2014; 2. "Bad Chick" Released: 5 September 2014; 3. "Hey Girl" Released: 7 November 2014

Melodie ("Melody") is the second studio album by German rapper Cro. It was released on 6 July 2014 by the hip-hop label Chimperator Productions in both a standard and deluxe edition. The album debuted at No. 1 on the German, Austrian, and Swiss album charts.

== Reception ==
Melodie rose to popularity after being released in the 26th week of 2014, rising to 1st place in the German charts. Overall, the album spent eight weeks in the top 10. In Austria and Switzerland, the album immediately placed at the top of the charts.

The first single off the album, entitled Traum (or Dream), was released on May 9, 2014 and reached No. 1 as well in Germany, Austria and Switzerland. In Germany, the song held the number 1 spot for four weeks. The second single Bad Chick was published on September 5, 2014 and reached position 9 in the German charts. Hey Girl, the third and last single reached number 35.

== Charts ==
=== Weekly charts ===
Chart (2014)	Peak position
Austrian Albums (Ö3 Austria)	1
German Albums (Offizielle Top 100)	1
Swiss Albums (Schweizer Hitparade)	1

=== Year-end charts ===
Chart (2014)	Position
Austrian Albums (Ö3 Austria)	7
German Albums (Offizielle Top 100)	11
Swiss Albums (Schweizer Hitparade)	19
