= Tru. =

tru.

Studio album by Cro
- Released: 8 September 2017
- Genre: Rap, pop
- Length: 83:30
- Label: Chimperator

Cro chronology
MTV Unplugged (2015)	tru. (2017)	Trip (2021)

Cro studio album chronology
Melodie (2014)	tru. (2017)	Trip (2021)

Singles from Raop
- 1. "Baum" Released: 30 May 2017; 2. "Unendlichkeit" Released: 2 June 2017; 3. "Tru" Released: 27 July 2017

tru. is the third studio album by German rapper Cro. It was released on 8 September 2017 by the hip-hop label Chimperator Productions. The album reached No. 1 of the German and Austrian, and No. 2 of the Swiss album charts.

== Track listing ==
1. "Kapitel 1"
2. "Fkngrt"
3. "Forrest Gump"
4. "Tru."
5. "Hi"
6. "Todas"
7. "Baum"
8. "Unendlichkeit (Main Edit)"
9. "Computiful"
10. "No 105."
11. "Noch da"
12. "Paperdreams"
13. "Fake You."
14. "Alien"
15. "0711"
16. "Slow Down"
17. "2kx"

== Charts ==
=== Weekly charts ===
Chart (2017)	Peak position
Austrian Albums (Ö3 Austria)	1
German Albums (Offizielle Top 100)	1
Swiss Albums (Schweizer Hitparade)	2

=== Year-end charts ===
Chart (2017)	Position
Austrian Albums (Ö3 Austria)	71
German Albums (Offizielle Top 100)	63

== Certifications ==
Region	Certification	Certified units/sales
Germany (BVMI)	Gold	100,000^{‡}
^{‡} Sales+streaming figures based on certification alone.
