= Du (Cro song) =

Single by Cro

from the album Raop
- Released: 29 June 2012
- Genre: Pop, rap
- Length: 2:54
- Label: Chimperator
- Songwriter: Cro
- Producer: Cro

Cro singles chronology
"Easy" (2012)	"Du" (2012)	"King of Raop" (2012)

"Du" ("You") is the second single by German rapper Cro. A pop and rap song, it was produced by Cro, and the lyrics and musical composition are also attributed to him. On 29 June 2012, the music video was released. The same day, the single was released on as the second single from his debut album Raop through Chimperator Productions.

== Track listing ==
All tracks are written by Cro.

iTunes single
No.	Title	Length
1.	"Du"	2:54
Total length:		2:54

CD single bonus track
No.	Title	Length
2.	"Du" (Budget Remix)	2:58
Total length:		5:52

Amazon digital download bonus track
No.	Title	Length
3.	"Du" (Instrumental)	2:54
Total length:		8:46

iTunes (bonus track version) - EP bonus track
No.	Title	Length
4.	"Meine Musik"	2:48
Total length:		11:34

== Charts ==
=== Weekly charts ===
Chart (2012)	Peak position
Austria (Ö3 Austria Top 40)	10
Germany (GfK)	2
Switzerland (Schweizer Hitparade)	42

=== Year-end charts ===
Chart (2012)	Position
Austria (Ö3 Austria Top 40)	58
Germany (Media Control AG)	35

== Certifications ==
Region	Certification	Certified units/sales
Austria (IFPI Austria)	Gold	15,000^{*}
Germany (BVMI)	2× Platinum	1,200,000^{‡}
Switzerland (IFPI Switzerland)	Gold	15,000^{^}
^{*} Sales figures based on certification alone.^{^} Shipments figures based on certification alone.^{‡} Sales+streaming figures based on certification alone.
