= Einmal um die Welt =

Single by Cro

from the album Raop
- Released: 2 November 2012
- Genre: Pop, rap
- Length: 2:21
- Label: Chimperator
- Songwriter: Cro. Kilians
- Producers: Cro, Kilians

Cro singles chronology
"Meine Zeit" (2012)	"Einmal um die Welt" (2012)	"Whatever" (2013)

"Einmal um die Welt" ("One time around the world") is the fifth single by German rapper Cro. A pop and rap song, it was produced by Cro and Kilians. It first appeared on his mixtape "Meine Musik", released on 11 February 2011. The lyrics and musical composition are attributed to Cro. On 27 October, the music video was released. The single was released on 2 November 2012 as the fifth single from Cro's debut album Raop on 23 March 2012 through Chimperator Productions.

The song samples "Fight the Start" by German indie rock band The Kilians. The official video clip was filmed entirely in Portugal (Lisbon and Cascais).

== Track listing ==
All tracks are written by Cro.

Single
No.	Title	Length
1.	"Einmal um die Welt"	2:21
2.	"Einmal um die Welt" (Budget Remix)	2:25
Total length:		4:46

Maxi edition
No.	Title	Length
1.	"Einmal um die Welt"	2:21
2.	"Starting Over"	2:45
3.	"Einmal um die Welt" (Budget Remix)	2:25
4.	"Einmal um die Welt" (Marlon & Stroh Remix)	3:52
5.	"Einmal um die Welt" (Instrumental)	2:21
6.	"Starting Over" (Instrumental)	2:45
Total length:		1

== Charts ==
Chart	Peak position
Austria (Ö3 Austria Top 40)	1
Germany (GfK)	8
Switzerland (Schweizer Hitparade)	27

=== Year-end charts ===
Chart (2012)	Position
Germany (Media Control AG)	65

Chart (2013)	Position
Germany (Media Control AG)	54

== Certifications ==
Region	Certification	Certified units/sales
Austria (IFPI Austria)	Platinum	30,000^{*}
Germany (BVMI)	Platinum	300,000^{^}
Switzerland (IFPI Switzerland)	Gold	15,000^{^}
^{*} Sales figures based on certification alone.^{^} Shipments figures based on certification alone.
