= Raop =

2012 studio album by Cro

Studio album by Cro
- Released: 6 July 2012
- Recorded: c. 2010-2012
- Genre: pop rap
- Length: 37:54
- Label: Chimperator
- Producers: Cro, Jopez, Conscious Youth, Shuko, Fonty, Kilians, Johannes Opper, Peerless, Ralf C. Mayer, Dexter

Cro chronology
Raop (2012)	Melodie (2014)

Singles from Raop
- 1. "Easy" Released: 23 March 2012; 2. "Du" Released: 29 June 2012; 3. "King of Raop" Released: 30 June 2012; 4. "Meine Zeit" Released: 1 July 2012; 5. "Einmal um die Welt" Released: 2 November 2012

Raop is the debut album by German rapper Cro. It was released on 6 July 2012 through Chimperator Productions. It sold 60,000 copies units in Germany in its first week.

On 23 March, the first single off the album, "Easy", was released. In June 2012, "Easy" was certificated gold. The music video to the song has over 50 million views on YouTube. From 29 June to 1 July 2012, Cro released one single each day; "Du", "King of Raop", and "Meine Zeit". Music videos were also filmed for every single. All of his five released singles were placed in the top 100 in the German single charts.

== Background ==
Cro worked on the album for one and a half months. On 19 April 2012 it was announced the album would be released on 6 July 2012. It was titled Raop after Cro's description of his music genre. He says it is a mixture between rap and pop. On 24 May 2012 the album cover was first uncovered.

== Versions ==
The album was released in five different versions, a standard version, including 13 songs, a Vinyl LP, also including the 13 songs, a premium edition, including 2 more songs, 4 remixes, and a DVD of the making-of the album, Road to Raop, a limited "Panda Banda Deluxe" edition, which includes the 13 songs, 2 bonus songs, 4 remixes, the DVD and instrumentals of all of the songs, and an exclusive Amazon edition, which includes the 13 songs, 2 bonus songs, 4 remixes, the DVDs, instrumentals of all of the songs, a T-shirt, and a playbutton which can play all of the 13 songs.

== Production ==
Raop was mostly produced by Cro himself. While he had often used samples for his earlier mixtapes he had to waive using portions of other songs. The reason was the short production progress which led to him not having enough time to obtain consent for using samples. Cro changed his working procedure to recording his own melodies.

== Promotion ==
=== Singles ===
Three songs from the album were released as singles. These were released on three consecutive days. "Du" was released on 29 June 2012. "King of Raop" was released as a promotional single on 30 June. "Meine Zeit" was released on 1 July as the last promotional single. Music videos were also made for all of the three songs. On 28 June 2012 the music video for "Du" was published on tape.tv. Following that, was the video for "King of Raop" which was filmed by a company from Stuttgart called Formzwei. The video for "Meine Zeit" was released by Juice Magazine. Parts of the video were filmed on the roof terrace of Chimperator Productions. On 27 October, Cro released the music video for his fifth single "Einmal um die Welt" which was released on 2 November. The song previously appeared on his Mixtape "Meine Musik" in early 2011.

=== Tour ===
On 5 May 2012 Cro embarked on the "Road to Raop Festival Tour" during which he has been visiting many festivals. During the tour he has visited Rock am Ring and Rock im Park and Splash! Festival. The tour is supposed to end on 22 September 2012. On 1 October, Cro embarked on the "Raop Tour".

== Track listing ==
No.	Title	Writer(s)	Producer(s)	Length
1.	"Intro"	Cro	Cro	2:46
2.	"King of Raop"	Cro	Jopez	3:09
3.	"Easy"	Cro	Cro	2:53
4.	"Geile Welt" (Awesome world)	Cro	Cro, Conscious Youth	2:52
5.	"Du" (You)	Cro	Cro	2:54
6.	"Wie ich bin" (The Way I am)	Cro	Shuko, Fonty	3:11
7.	"Meine Zeit" (My time)	Cro	Cro	3:09
8.	"Nie mehr" (Never again)	Cro	Cro	3:03
9.	"Jeder Tag" (Everyday)	Cro	Cro	2:56
10.	"Genauso" (Just like that)	Cro	Cro	3:28
11.	"Einmal um die Welt" (Once around the world)	Cro	Cro, Kilians	2:22
12.	"Wir waren hier" (We were here)	Cro	Cro, Johannes Opper, Peerless, Ralf C. Mayer	2:24
13.	"Ein Teil" (One part)	Cro	Dexter	2:56
Total length:				37:54

Premium edition bonus tracks
No.	Title	Writer(s)	Producer(s)	Length
14.	"Hässlich" (Ugly)	Cro	Cro, Opper, Peerless, Mayer	2:58
15.	"Papa schüttelt seinen Kopf" (Daddy shakes his head)	Cro	Cro	3:06
16.	"Meine Zeit (Jopez Remix)"	Cro		3:27
17.	"Easy (Guido Craveiro Reggae Remix)"	Cro, Bobby Hebb	Cro	3:37
18.	"Wir waren hier (Budget Remix)"	Cro		2:12
19.	"Meine Zeit (Kaas, Maeckes & Peerless Remix)"	Cro		2:52
20.	"Road to Raop DVD"			26:31
Total length:				1:22:34

Exclusive Amazon Edition bonus tracks
No.	Title	Length
21.	"Instrumentals"	37:54
Total length:		2:00:28

Samples

- "Easy" contains a sample of "Sunny" by Mieko Hirota
- "Meine Zeit" contains a sample of "My Name Is" by Eminem
- "Wir waren hier" contains a sample of "The Passenger" by Iggy Pop

== Raop +5 ==
Raop +5
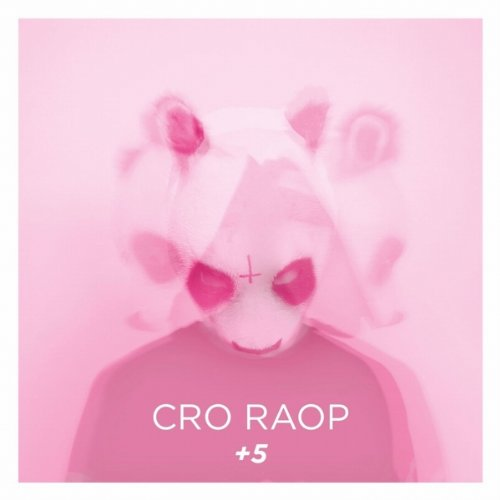

Studio album (reissue) by Cro
- Released: 5 July 2013
- Genres: Rap, pop
- Label: Chimperator
- Producers: Cro, Jopez, Conscious Youth, Shuko, Fonty, Kilians, Johannes Opper, Peerless, Ralf C. Mayer, Dexter

Cro chronology
Raop (2012)	Raop +5 (2013)

Singles from Raop
- 1. "Whatever" Released: 28 June 2013

On 5 July 2013, a new extended version of the album was released titled Raop +5 that included the 15 songs of the premium edition plus five additional tracks, including the single "Whatever" and "Chillin", "Bei dir", "Ab jetzt" and "Wie du".

Track list

1. "Intro" (2:46)
2. "King of Raop" (3:09)
3. "Easy" (2:52)
4. "Geile Welt" (2:50)
5. "Du" (2:54)
6. "Wie ich bin" (3:11)
7. "Meine Zeit (3:07)
8. "Nie mehr" (3:04)
9. "Jeder Tag" (2:56)
10. "Genauso" (3:25)
11. "Einmal um die Welt" (2:22)
12. "Wir waren hier" (2:24)
13. "Ein Teil" (2:55)
14. "Hässlich" (2:58)
15. "Papa schüttelt seinen Kopf" (3:06)
16. "Whatever" (3:11)
17. "Chillin" (4:32)
18. "Bei dir" (2:19)
19. "Ab jetzt" (2:49)
20. "Wie du" (2:32)

== Personnel ==
=== Performance ===
- Cro - primary artist, vocals, composer, mixing, production, writer
- Carl-Michael Grabinger - drums
- Guido Craveiro - bass, drums, guitar, keys, production, trombone, mixing, remixing
- Karolina "Lean" Kovac - vocals
- Peter Weihe - guitar
- Johannes Opper - bass, guitar, composer, production
- Til Schneider - trombone

=== Technical ===
- Arne Schult – composer
- Benedikt Janny – composer
- Bobby Hebb – composer, writer
- Carl Möller – composer
- Christoph Bauss – composer
- Conscious Youths – production
- Den Kilians – composer, production
- Dexter – production
- Dominic Lorberg – composer
- Felix Göppel – composer
- Gordian Scholz – composer
- Jonas Lang – composer
- Jopez – production
- Karri Miettinen – composer
- Lasse Mellberg – composer

- Lukas Michalczyk – composer
- Markus Winter – composer
- Michael Schuermann – composer
- Morten "Pro-Moe" Edh – composer
- Narinder Singh – composer
- Niko Papadopoulos – composer
- Peerless – mixing, production
- Peter Albertz – composer
- Ralf Christian Mayer – composer, mixing, production
- Sascha "Busy" Bühren – mastering
- Shuko & Fonty – production
- Simon Hartog – composer
- Tom Krüger – mastering
- Volker "IDR" Gebhardt – mixing

== Chart positions ==
=== Weekly charts ===
Chart (2012–13)	Peak position
Austrian Albums (Ö3 Austria)	1
German Albums (Offizielle Top 100)	1
Swiss Albums (Schweizer Hitparade)	7

=== Year-end charts ===
Chart (2012)	Position
Austrian Albums (Ö3 Austria)	15
German Albums (Offizielle Top 100)	9
Swiss Albums (Schweizer Hitparade)	58

Chart (2013)	Position
Austrian Albums (Ö3 Austria)	28
German Albums (Offizielle Top 100)	26
Swiss Albums (Schweizer Hitparade)	84

== Certifications ==
Region	Certification	Certified units/sales
Austria (IFPI Austria)	Platinum	20,000^{*}
Germany (BVMI)	7× Gold	700,000^{‡}
Switzerland (IFPI Switzerland)	Gold	15,000^{^}
^{*} Sales figures based on certification alone.^{^} Shipments figures based on certification alone.^{‡} Sales+streaming figures based on certification alone.
