= Easy (Cro song) =

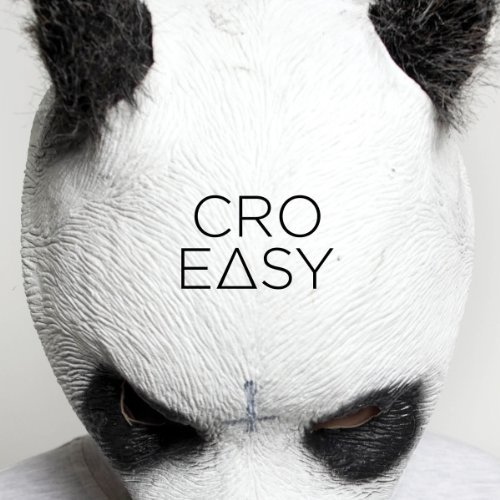

Single by Cro

from the album Raop
- Released: 23 March 2012
- Genre: Pop, rap
- Length: 2:53
- Label: Chimperator
- Songwriter: Cro
- Producer: Cro

Cro singles chronology
"Easy" (2012)	"Du" (2012)

Maxi edition

"Easy" is the debut single of German rapper Cro. A pop and rap song, it was produced by Cro, and the lyrics and musical composition are also attributed to him. It was first released on the internet on 23 November 2011, was later released on his mixtape Easy, which was available for free download, and later re-released as the lead single from his debut album Raop on 23 March 2012 through Chimperator Productions.

"Easy" attained commercial success, reaching number two in Germany and number 4 in Austria. The song was promoted by an accompanying music video directed by Harris Hodovic. It reached Platinum in Germany in October 2012.

== Content ==
In the first verse, Cro praises his rapping skills by comparing himself to Jay-Z and saying that he creates his instrumentals himself. He then changes the subject to the relationship with a woman and he gives reasons that would lead to him break up with her, such as marriage and pregnancy. In the end, he does leave her and is happy that she is no longer there.

In the lyrics, the word "easy" appears at the end of each verse, with a word that is based on it. For example, the words AC/DC and the phrase "erschieß sie" become "AC/D-Easy" and "ersch-Easy." The song does not have an actual chorus.

== Production ==
Cro produced the beat for "Easy" himself and used a sample of Bobby Hebb's song "Sunny" and also modeled the lyrics after this song. The track reached Platinum in October 2012.

== Music video ==
The music video for "Easy" was directed by Harris Hodovic and premiered on YouTube on 23 November 2011. It shows a woman (played by the model Sula Starridou) who is rapping the lyrics instead of Cro as she is walking through an apartment in which many different situations are depicted which are oriented after the song. The location then moves outside, where the woman continues to rap while in a skatepark/riding a bike. As of September 2017, the video has been viewed 53 million times on YouTube.

== Track listing ==
All tracks are written by Cro.

Digital download
No.	Title	Length
1.	"Easy"	2:53
2.	"Easy" (instrumental)	2:53
3.	"Easy" (a capella)	2:15
Total length:		8:01

CD single
No.	Title	Length
2.	"Easy" (music video)	3:14
Total length:		11:15

Maxi edition
No.	Title	Length
1.	"Easy"	2:53
2.	"Hi Kids"	3:14
3.	"Lieblingssong"	2:11
4.	"Konfetti (feat. Ahzumjot & Rockstah)"	3:12
Total length:		11:30

== Charts ==
=== Weekly charts ===
Chart (2011–2012)	Peak position
Austria (Ö3 Austria Top 40)	4
Germany (GfK)	2
Luxembourg Digital Songs (Billboard)	3
Switzerland (Schweizer Hitparade)	22

=== Year-end charts ===
Chart (2012)	Position
Austria (Ö3 Austria Top 40)	17
Germany (Media Control AG)	19
Switzerland (Schweizer Hitparade)	63

== Certifications ==
Region	Certification	Certified units/sales
Austria (IFPI Austria)	Platinum	30,000^{*}
Germany (BVMI)	3× Platinum	1,800,000^{‡}
Switzerland (IFPI Switzerland)	Platinum	30,000^{^}
^{*} Sales figures based on certification alone.^{^} Shipments figures based on certification alone.^{‡} Sales+streaming figures based on certification alone.
