= Cro (musician) =

German rapper (born 1990)

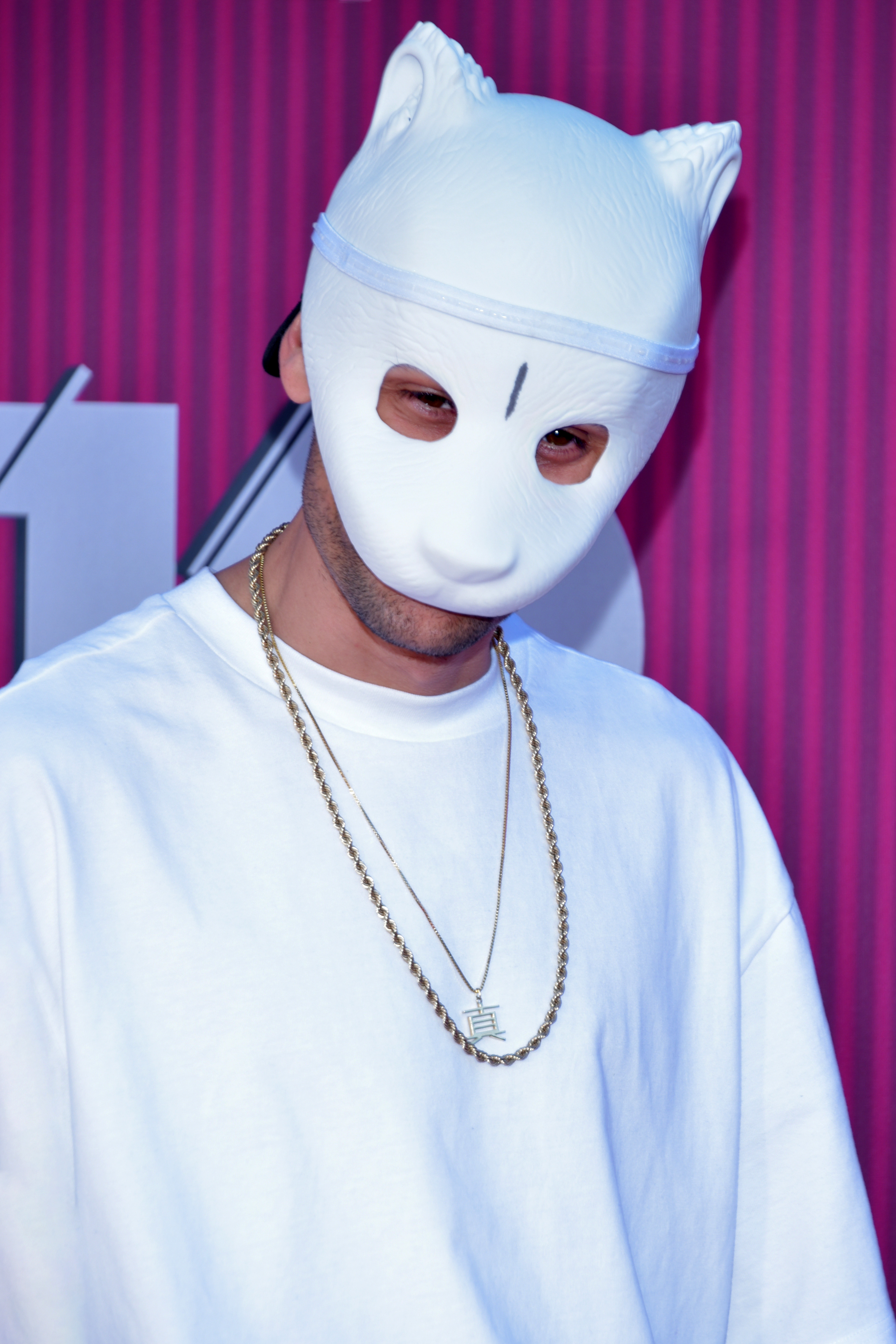
- Cro in 2019

Background information
- Born: Carlo Waibel; 31 January 1990 (age 36); Mutlangen, West Germany
- Genres: Pop rap, hip hop
- Occupations: Rapper, singer, producer
- Years active: 2006–present
- Website: cromusik.de

Carlo Waibel (born 31 January 1990), better known by the stage name Cro, is a German rapper and singer. He describes his music as a mixture between rap and pop, which he calls "raop". He is known for wearing a panda mask on stage.

== Early life ==
Cro was born Carlo Waibel. He attended the Realschule Galgenberg in Aalen, and later the Johannes-Gutenberg-Schule, a vocational school in Stuttgart. He began recording music at the age of 13. and learned to play piano and guitar.

== Musical career ==
In 2009, Cro released his first mixtape, Trash. On 11 February 2011, his second mixtape Meine Musik was released. It was available for free download. Cro produced the entire mixtape himself. Through the mixtape, German hip-hop musician Kaas took notice of Cro. Besides his musical career, Cro is also active as a designer. Since 2010, he has been designing under his clothing label Vio Vio. After receiving his Mittlere Reife, he completed an apprenticeship as a media designer and worked for the Stuttgarter Zeitung as a cartoonist.

Through Kaas, Cro met Sebastian Andrej Schweizer, founder of the independent label, Chimperator Productions, and Kodimey Awokou. At the end of September 2011, a making-of video for a new artist was published by the label, leading to speculations about which artist had been signed. In October 2011, Schweizer announced that he had signed Cro.

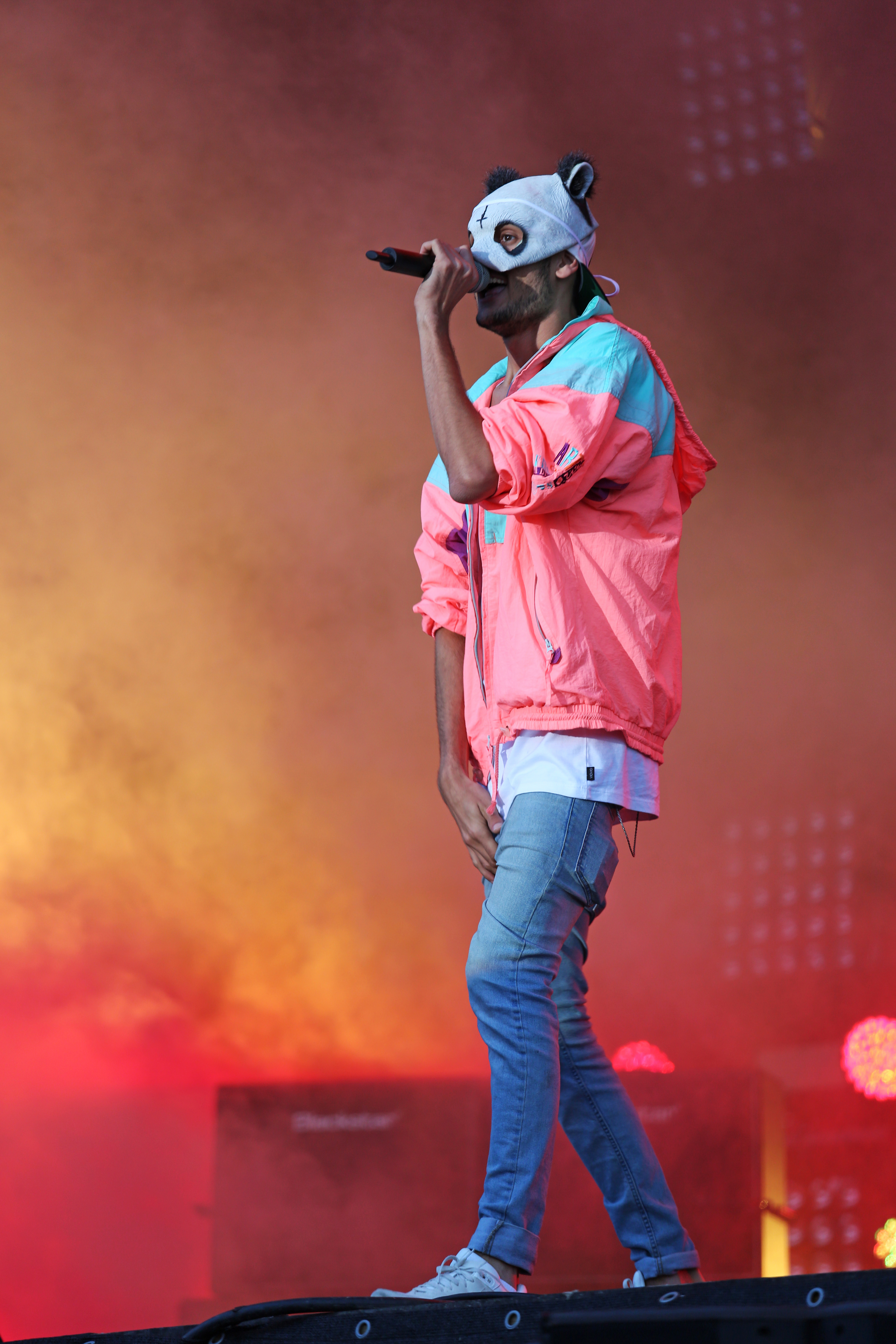
Cro performing in 2013

From 30 October until 7 November 2011, Cro was a supporting act for the Norwegian band Madcon during their Glow Tour 2011. During the concert and for photos, Cro wore a panda mask. Psaiko.Dino, producer at Chimperator Productions, adopted the role as a spokesperson for Cro, especially for the videoblogs.

In November 2011, the music video for Easy, which had been directed by Harris Hodovic and was announcing the upcoming mixtape, was released on tape.tv. A few days later, the video was released on YouTube, where it gained more than 500,000 views in the first two weeks. In the beginning of 2012, it had gained 12 million views, mid-May, the view count had risen to a number of more than 44 million. The American blog hypetrak.com also reported on the video and Cro. German hip-hop and funk musician Jan Delay posted the video on his Facebook page and said Cro was the "future of German rap". Besides "Easy", "Hi Kids" and "Kein Benz" were also released prior to the release of the mixtape. On 1 December 2011, Cro was a guest on the show NeoParadise by the channel ZDFneo, where he performed snippets of three songs from his mixtapes Meine Musik and Easy. One day later, Chimperator Productions released the mixtape Easy which is available for free download on their website.

In the beginning of 2012, Cro signed a contract with Universal Music Publishing Group. On 27 January 2012, he embarked on a concert tour named "Pandas Gone Wild!", on which he was accompanied by Psaiko.Dino. In mid February 2012, the music video for "Easy" gained 1,000,000 views on YouTube. In mid May the number of the views rose to 3,000,000. On 23 March 2012, the song "Easy" was released as a single. Besides the Standard version, the Limited Edition version included the songs "Hi Kids", "Lieblingssong", as well as "Konfetti", a collaboration with Ahzumjot and Rockstah. "Easy" entered the German Single Charts on second place.

In June 2012, Cro's single "Easy" was certified gold in Germany. The music video for the single gained 20,000,000 views on YouTube. From 29 June until 1 July, Cro released one single each day, "Du", "King of Raop", and "Meine Zeit". Music videos were also filmed for every single. On 6 July, Cro released his debut album, Raop. Mid-July, "Easy", "Hi Kids", "Du", "King of Raop", and "Meine Zeit", all of his five released singles were placed in the Top 100 in the German Single Charts.

On 7 September 2012, Cro released a free mixtape called Raop which included 16 remixes of songs from his album Raop. On 28 September, Cro competed in the Bundesvision Song Contest with his and Die Orsons' song "Horst & Monika" and took the fifth place. On 19 October 2012, Cro released the track "1 Millionen" through the iTunes and made it available for free download. He dedicated this track to having more than 1 million fans on Facebook. On 21 October, he released a music video to accompany the track.

On 27 October 2012, Cro released the music video for his fifth single "Einmal um die Welt" which was released on 2 November. In November, Cro's debut album, Raop and single "Easy" reached platinum status in Germany whereas "Du" was certified gold. In Austria, Raop and "Easy" and in Switzerland, "Easy" were also certified gold. He also won the Bambi award in the category "Pop National". On 6 December, he won the 1LIVE Krone for "Beste Single" for his debut single, "Easy". He was also named Newcomer of the Year 2012 by iTunes. His debut album, Raop was named "Album of the Year" by MTV.

In March 2013, Cro won a Swiss Music Award in the category "Best Album Urban - International" for his album Raop. Cro has cooperated with H&M and has designed a collection of clothes for men and women which was released on 4 April 2013. On 11 March, H&M and Cro released additional behind-the-scenes images plus an interview.

== Other ventures ==
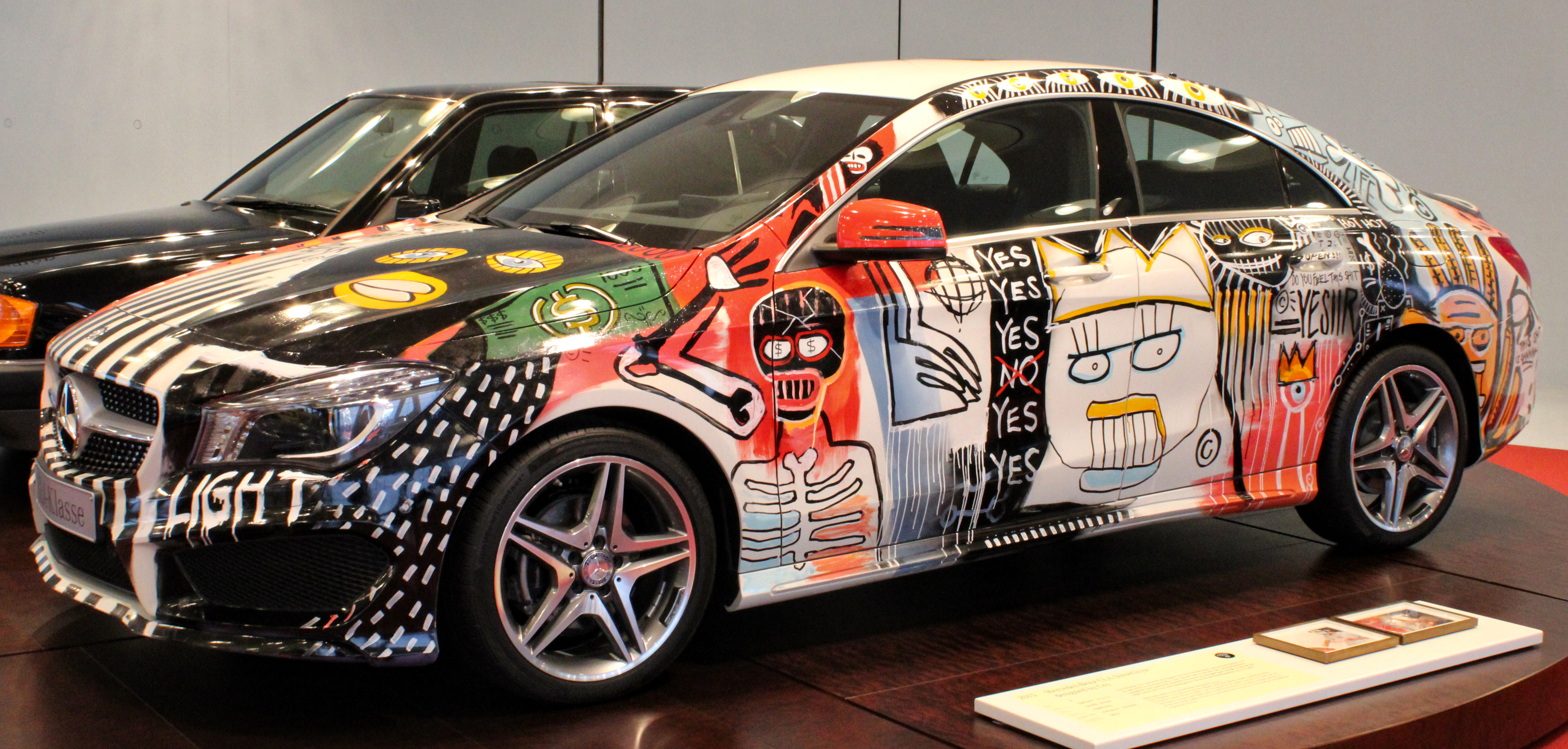
Mercedes-Benz CLA StreetStyle designed by Cro

Apart from his music, Cro also works as a designer. In 2010, he founded his own fashion label called VioVio. In 2015, he created a unique design for a Mercedes-Benz CLA which was given as a prize to one of his fans and is now part of the Mercedes-Benz Museum in Stuttgart, Germany.

After the release of his last studio album tru., Cro started showing more of his art in general. On 8 September 2017, he had his first vernissage at the Circle Culture Gallery in Berlin, where he showed several pieces of art, including masks that he colored and self-made paintings.

In 2016, Cro made his first movie titled Unsere Zeit ist jetzt ("Our Time Is Now"), where he collaborated with German actor Til Schweiger. The movie premiered on 6 October 2016 in German cinemas.

== Panda mask ==
Cro does not show his face in public. To protect his privacy, he wears a mask for all musical and media appearances. He has also stated that the masks serve to draw attention to his music as opposed to him as a person. His first mask was a cut version made out of latex. Since 2014, he has worn an alternate mask made of cotton for some performances. Since the premiere of the video for "Unendlichkeit", Cro has worn a more minimalistic mask that is made of plastic and is fully white.

Since 13 August 2020, Cro changed his mask with nearly every new single he released for his album, trip. Currently he has been releasing promotional photos using a “futuristic space mask”, which vaguely resembles the panda mask he used to wear.

== Discography ==
- Raop (2012)
- Melodie (2014)
- MTV Unplugged (2015)
- tru. (2017)
- trip (2021)
- 11:11 (2022)

== Tours ==
- Support for Madcon's Glow Tour (2011) (8 shows)
- Pandas Gone Wild! Tour (2012) (10 shows)
- Hip Teens Wear Tight Jeans 2012 Tour (with Rockstah and Ahzumjot, 2012) (17 shows)
- Road to Raop Festival Tour (2012) (20 shows)
- Raop Tour (2012–13) (44 shows)
- Cro Open Air Tour 2013 (2013) (14 shows)
- Mello Tour 2015
- stay tru. tour 2018
- trip is (a)live Tour 2022
- Cronicles Open Air 2025

== Awards and nominations ==
Year	Ceremony	Category	Work	Result	Ref.
2012	1LIVE Krone	Best Album	Raop	Nominated	
2012	1LIVE Krone	Best Single	"Easy"	Won	
2012	Bambi Awards	Pop National	—N/a	Won	
2012	Hiphop.de Awards	Best Facebook Page	/cromusic	Nominated	
2012	Hiphop.de Awards	Best Newcomer - National	—N/a	Nominated	
2012	Hiphop.de Awards	Best Rap-Solo-Act - National	—N/a	Nominated	
2012	Hiphop.de Awards	Best Release - National	Raop	Nominated	
2012	Hiphop.de Awards	Best Song - National	"Du"	Nominated	
2012	Hiphop.de Awards	Best Video - National	"Meine Zeit"	Nominated	
2012	MTV Europe Music Awards	Best German Act	—N/a	Nominated	
2012	World Music Awards	World's Best Song	"Easy"	Pending	
2012	World Music Awards	World's Best Video	"Easy"	Pending	
2012	World Music Awards	World's Best Male Artist	—N/a	Pending	
2013	Swiss Music Awards	Best Album Urban - International	Raop	Won	
2017	Hiphop.de Awards	Best Producer National	N/A	Won	
