= MTV Europe Music Award for Best Swiss Act =

Category of MTV Europe Music Awards

The following is a list of the MTV Europe Music Award winners and nominees for Best Swiss Act.

== Winners and nominees ==
Winners are listed first and highlighted in bold.

=== 2000s ===
| Year | Artist | Ref |
|---|---|---|
2009
| 2009 | **Stress** | |
| 2009 | Lovebugs | |
| 2009 | Phenomden | |
| 2009 | Ritschi | |
| 2009 | Seven | |

=== 2010s ===
| Year | Artist | Ref |
|---|---|---|
2010
| 2010 | **Greis** | |
| 2010 | Baschi | |
| 2010 | Lunik | |
| 2010 | Marc Sway | |
| 2010 | Stefanie Heinzmann | |
2011
| 2011 | **Gimma** | |
| 2011 | Adrian Stern | |
| 2011 | Baschi | |
| 2011 | Myron | |
| 2011 | TinkaBelle | |
| 2011 | Blue Cold Ice Creams | |
2012
| 2012 | **DJ Antoine** | |
| 2012 | 77 Bombay Street | |
| 2012 | Mike Candys | |
| 2012 | Remady | |
| 2012 | Stress | |
2013
| 2013 | **Bastian Baker** | |
| 2013 | DJ Antoine | |
| 2013 | Remady & Manu-L | |
| 2013 | Steff La Cheffe | |
| 2013 | Stress | |
2014
| 2014 | **Sinplus** | |
| 2014 | Bastian Baker | |
| 2014 | DJ Antoine | |
| 2014 | Remady & Manu-L | |
| 2014 | Mr.Da-Nos & The Product G&B | |
| 2014 | Pre-nominations: Sinplus; Pegasus; 77 Bombay Street; Patrick Miller | |
2015
| 2015 | **Stefanie Heinzmann** | |
| 2015 | Can "Stress" Canatan | |
| 2015 | 77 Bombay Street | |
| 2015 | DJ Antoine | |
| 2015 | Lo & Leduc | |
2016
| 2016 | **Chlyklass** | |
| 2016 | Damian Lynn | |
| 2016 | Nickless | |
| 2016 | Bastian Baker | |
| 2016 | Bligg | |
2017
| 2017 | **Mimiks** | |
| 2017 | Lo & Leduc | |
| 2017 | Pegasus | |
| 2017 | Xen | |
| 2017 | Züri West | |
2018
| 2018 | **Loco Escrito** | |
| 2018 | Zibbz | |
| 2018 | Lo & Leduc | |
| 2018 | Hecht | |
| 2018 | Pronto | |
2019
| 2019 | **Loredana** | |
| 2019 | Stefanie Heinzmann | |
| 2019 | Ilira | |
| 2019 | Monet192 | |
| 2019 | Faber | |

=== 2020s ===
| Year | Artist | Ref |
|---|---|---|
2020
| 2020 | **Loredana** | |
| 2020 | Seven | |
| 2020 | Bligg | |
| 2020 | Loco Escrito | |
| 2020 | Pronto | |
2021
| 2021 | **Gjon's Tears** | |
| 2021 | Arma Jackson | |
| 2021 | Monet192 | |
| 2021 | Stefanie Heinzmann | |
| 2021 | Loredana | |
2022
| 2022 | **Loredana** | |
| 2022 | Patent Ochsner | |
| 2022 | Marius Bear | |
| 2022 | Faber | |
| 2022 | Priya Ragu | |
2023
| 2023 | **Gjon's Tears** | |
| 2023 | Monet192 | |
| 2023 | Danitsa | |
| 2023 | Stress | |
| 2023 | Tantie Kita | |
2024
| 2024 | **Nemo** | |
| 2024 | Benjamin Amaru | |
| 2024 | Faber | |
| 2024 | Priya Ragu | |
| 2024 | Stress | |
