= List of number-one hits of 2013 (Switzerland) =

This is a list of the Swiss Hitparade number ones of 2013.

== Swiss charts ==
Issue date	Song	Artist	Album	Artist
6 January	"Diamonds"	Rihanna	Unapologetic	Rihanna
13 January	"Gangnam Style"	Psy	Nothing but the Beat	David Guetta
20 January	"Scream & Shout"	will.i.am featuring Britney Spears	The Truth About Love	Pink
27 January	"Scream & Shout"	will.i.am featuring Britney Spears	Powerplay	Shakra
3 February	"Scream & Shout"	will.i.am featuring Britney Spears	Django Unchained	Various artists
10 February	"Bella Vita"	DJ Antoine	Sky Is the Limit	DJ Antoine
17 February	"Scream & Shout"	will.i.am featuring Britney Spears	Sky Is the Limit	DJ Antoine
24 February	"Thrift Shop"	Macklemore and Ryan Lewis featuring Wanz	Jung, brutal, gutaussehend 2	Kollegah and Farid Bang
3 March	"Thrift Shop"	Macklemore and Ryan Lewis featuring Wanz	Sky Is the Limit	DJ Antoine
10 March	"Thrift Shop"	Macklemore and Ryan Lewis featuring Wanz	Dirty Dynamite	Krokus
17 March	"Thrift Shop"	Macklemore and Ryan Lewis featuring Wanz	Dirty Dynamite	Krokus
24 March	"Thrift Shop"	Macklemore and Ryan Lewis featuring Wanz	The Next Day	David Bowie
31 March	"Let Her Go"	Passenger	The 20/20 Experience	Justin Timberlake
7 April	"Let Her Go"	Passenger	Delta Machine	Depeche Mode
14 April	"Let Her Go"	Passenger	Delta Machine	Depeche Mode
21 April	"Let Her Go"	Passenger	Outlaw Gentlemen & Shady Ladies	Volbeat
28 April	"Let Her Go"	Passenger	To Be Loved	Michael Bublé
5 May	"Get Lucky"	Daft Punk feat. Pharrell Williams	Living the Dream	Luca Hänni
12 May	"Get Lucky"	Daft Punk feat. Pharrell Williams	Vögu Zum Geburtstag	Steff La Cheffe
19 May	"Get Lucky"	Daft Punk feat. Pharrell Williams	Marylou	Anna Rossinelli
26 May	"Mein Herz"	Beatrice Egli	Recto Verso	Zaz
2 June	"Get Lucky"	Daft Punk feat. Pharrell Williams	Random Access Memories	Daft Punk
9 June	"Blurred Lines"	Robin Thicke feat. T.I. and Pharrell Williams	Glücksgefühle	Beatrice Egli
16 June	"Blurred Lines"	Robin Thicke feat. T.I. and Pharrell Williams	Glücksgefühle	Beatrice Egli
23 June	"Blurred Lines"	Robin Thicke feat. T.I. and Pharrell Williams	13	Black Sabbath
30 June	"Blurred Lines"	Robin Thicke feat. T.I. and Pharrell Williams	13	Black Sabbath
7 July	"Blurred Lines"	Robin Thicke feat. T.I. and Pharrell Williams	13	Black Sabbath
14 July	"Blurred Lines"	Robin Thicke feat. T.I. and Pharrell Williams	Glücksgefühle	Beatrice Egli
21 July	"Wake Me Up!"	Avicii	Magna Carta... Holy Grail	Jay-Z
28 July	"Wake Me Up!"	Avicii	Magna Carta... Holy Grail	Jay-Z
4 August	"Wake Me Up!"	Avicii	Magna Carta... Holy Grail	Jay-Z
11 August	"Wake Me Up!"	Avicii	Blurred Lines	Robin Thicke
18 August	"Wake Me Up!"	Avicii	In a World Like This	Backstreet Boys
25 August	"Wake Me Up!"	Avicii	Glücksgefühle	Beatrice Egli
1 September	"Wake Me Up!"	Avicii	Racine carrée	Stromae
8 September	"Wake Me Up!"	Avicii	Racine carrée	Stromae
15 September	"Wake Me Up!"	Avicii	Racine carrée	Stromae
22 September	"Wake Me Up!"	Avicii	Atlantis	Andrea Berg
29 September	"Wake Me Up!"	Avicii	Loud Like Love	Placebo
6 October	"Wake Me Up!"	Avicii	Fire Within	Birdy
13 October	"Wake Me Up!"	Avicii	Too Old to Die Young	Bastian Baker
20 October	"Bonfire Heart"	James Blunt	Farbenspiel	Helene Fischer
27 October	"Bonfire Heart"	James Blunt	Farbenspiel	Helene Fischer
3 November	"Bonfire Heart"	James Blunt	Moon Landing	James Blunt
10 November	"Jubel"	Klingande	Service Publigg	Bligg
17 November	"The Monster"	Eminem feat. Rihanna	The Marshall Mathers LP 2	Eminem
24 November	"The Monster"	Eminem feat. Rihanna	The Marshall Mathers LP 2	Eminem
1 December	"The Monster"	Eminem feat. Rihanna	Swings Both Ways	Robbie Williams
8 December	"Stolen Dance"	Milky Chance	Pure Lebensfreude	Beatrice Egli
15 December	"Stolen Dance"	Milky Chance	30-11-80	Sido
22 December	"Stolen Dance"	Milky Chance	Swings Both Ways	Robbie Williams
29 December	"Stolen Dance"	Milky Chance	Swings Both Ways	Robbie Williams

== Romandie charts ==
Issue date	Song	Artist	Album	Artist
6 January	"Gangnam Style"	Psy	Sans attendre	Céline Dion
13 January	"Gangnam Style"	Psy	Sans attendre	Céline Dion
20 January	"Diamonds"	Rihanna	Sans attendre	Céline Dion
27 January	"Scream & Shout"	will.i.am featuring Britney Spears	Sans attendre	Céline Dion
3 February	"Scream & Shout"	will.i.am featuring Britney Spears	Génération Goldman	Various artists
10 February	"Scream & Shout"	will.i.am featuring Britney Spears	Génération Goldman	Various artists
17 February	"Thrift Shop"	Macklemore and Ryan Lewis featuring Wanz	Drôle de parcours	La Fouine
24 February	"Thrift Shop"	Macklemore and Ryan Lewis featuring Wanz	Black City Parade	Indochine
3 March	"Thrift Shop"	Macklemore and Ryan Lewis featuring Wanz	Black City Parade	Indochine
10 March	"Thrift Shop"	Macklemore and Ryan Lewis featuring Wanz	Génération Goldman	Various artists
17 March	"Thrift Shop"	Macklemore and Ryan Lewis featuring Wanz	Girl Who Got Away	Dido
24 March	"Thrift Shop"	Macklemore and Ryan Lewis featuring Wanz	The Next Day	David Bowie
31 March	"Thrift Shop"	Macklemore and Ryan Lewis featuring Wanz	La boîte à musique des Enfoirés	Les Enfoirés
7 April	"Just Give Me a Reason"	Pink feat. Nate Ruess	Delta Machine	Depeche Mode
14 April	"Just Give Me a Reason"	Pink feat. Nate Ruess	La boîte à musique des Enfoirés	Les Enfoirés
21 April	"Just Give Me a Reason"	Pink feat. Nate Ruess	Delta Machine	Depeche Mode
28 April	"Just Give Me a Reason"	Pink feat. Nate Ruess	Together Alone	Alex Hepburn
5 May	"Get Lucky"	Daft Punk feat. Pharrell Williams	Arts Martiens	IAM
12 May	"Get Lucky"	Daft Punk feat. Pharrell Williams	Arts Martiens	IAM
19 May	"Get Lucky"	Daft Punk feat. Pharrell Williams	Arts Martiens	IAM
26 May	"Get Lucky"	Daft Punk feat. Pharrell Williams	Recto Verso	Zaz
2 June	"Get Lucky"	Daft Punk feat. Pharrell Williams	Random Access Memories	Daft Punk
9 June	"Get Lucky"	Daft Punk feat. Pharrell Williams	Random Access Memories	Daft Punk
16 June	"Blurred Lines"	Robin Thicke feat. T.I. and Pharrell Williams	Random Access Memories	Daft Punk
23 June	"Blurred Lines"	Robin Thicke feat. T.I. and Pharrell Williams	Je veux du bonheur	Christophe Maé
30 June	"Blurred Lines"	Robin Thicke feat. T.I. and Pharrell Williams	Je veux du bonheur	Christophe Maé
7 July	"Blurred Lines"	Robin Thicke feat. T.I. and Pharrell Williams	Je veux du bonheur	Christophe Maé
14 July	"Blurred Lines"	Robin Thicke feat. T.I. and Pharrell Williams	Random Access Memories	Daft Punk
21 July	"Blurred Lines"	Robin Thicke feat. T.I. and Pharrell Williams	Random Access Memories	Daft Punk
28 July	"Blurred Lines"	Robin Thicke feat. T.I. and Pharrell Williams	Random Access Memories	Daft Punk
4 August	"Wake Me Up!"	Avicii	Random Access Memories	Daft Punk
11 August	"Wake Me Up!"	Avicii	Random Access Memories	Daft Punk
18 August	"Wake Me Up!"	Avicii	Random Access Memories	Daft Punk
25 August	"Wake Me Up!"	Avicii	Random Access Memories	Daft Punk
1 September	"Wake Me Up!"	Avicii	Racine carrée	Stromae
8 September	"Wake Me Up!"	Avicii	Racine carrée	Stromae
15 September	"Wake Me Up!"	Avicii	Racine carrée	Stromae
22 September	"Wake Me Up!"	Avicii	Racine carrée	Stromae
29 September	"Wake Me Up!"	Avicii	Racine carrée	Stromae
6 October	"Wake Me Up!"	Avicii	Racine carrée	Stromae
13 October	"Formidable"	Stromae	Too Old To Die Young	Bastian Baker
20 October	"Bonfire Heart"	James Blunt	Racine carrée	Stromae
27 October	"Animals"	Martin Garrix	Racine carrée	Stromae
3 November	"Animals"	Martin Garrix	Moon Landing	James Blunt
10 November	"Animals"	Martin Garrix	Racine carrée	Stromae
17 November	"The Monster"	Eminem feat. Rihanna	The Marshall Mathers LP 2	Eminem
24 November	"Royals"	Lorde	Artpop	Lady Gaga
1 December	"Royals"	Lorde	Racine carrée	Stromae
8 December	"Royals"	Lorde	Midnight Memories	One Direction
15 December	"Hey Brother"	Avicii	Racine carrée	Stromae
22 December	"Hey Brother"	Avicii	Racine carrée	Stromae
29 December	"Hey Brother"	Avicii	Racine carrée	Stromae
