= DJ Antoine discography =

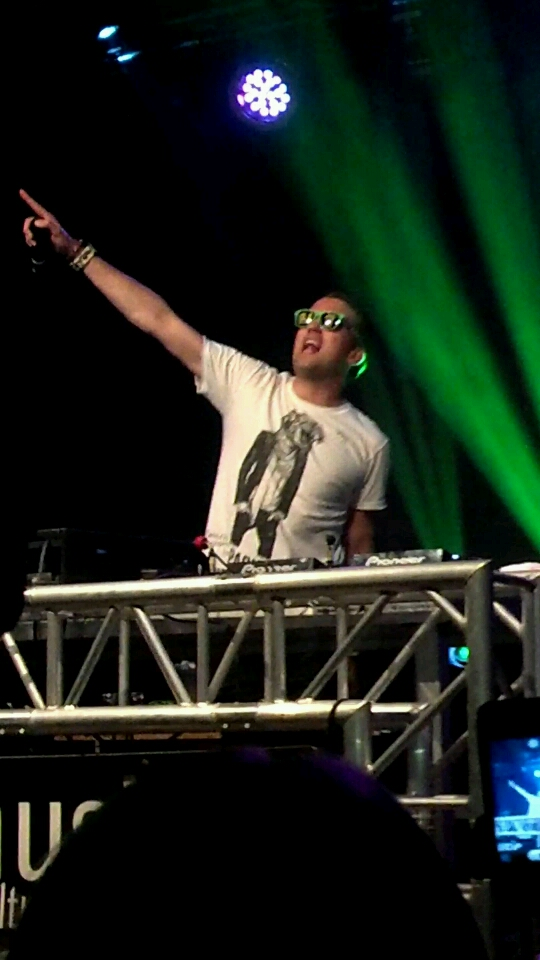
- DJ Antoine at Pahlazzo (2013)
- Studio albums: 13
- Extended plays: 2
- Live albums: 4
- Compilation albums: 2
- Singles: 32

This is the discography of DJ Antoine, a Swiss DJ and producer. Since 1997, he has released 13 studio albums and over 35 singles.

== Albums ==
=== Studio albums ===
List of studio albums, with selected chart positions and certifications
Title	Album details	Peak chart positions					Certifications
Title	Album details	SWI	AUT	BEL (FL)	FRA	GER	Certifications
Stop!	Released: 25 April 2008; Label: Phonag; Format: CD, digital download	4	—	—	—	—	IFPI SWI: Gold
2008	Released: 13 June 2008 (SWI); Label: Phonag; Formats: CD, digital download	2	—	—	—	—	IFPI SWI: Gold
A Weekend at Hotel Campari	Released: 26 September 2008 (SWI); Label: Phonag; Formats: CD, digital download	4	—	—	—	—	IFPI SWI: Gold
2009	Released: 27 March 2009 (SWI); Label: Phonag; Formats: CD, digital download	1	—	—	—	—	IFPI SWI: Gold
Superhero?	Released: 12 June 2009 (SWI); Label: Phonag; Formats: CD, digital download	2	—	—	—	—	
17900	Released: 13 November 2009 (SWI); Label: Phonag; Formats: CD, digital download	9	—	—	—	—	
2010	Released: 7 May 2010 (SWI); Label: Phonag; Formats: CD, digital download	1	—	—	—	—	
WOW	Released: 5 November 2010 (SWI); Label: Phonag; Formats: CD, digital download	7	—	—	—	—	
2011	Released: 27 May 2011 (SWI); Label: Phonag; Formats: CD, digital download	1	—	—	—	—	IFPI SWI: Platinum
Welcome to DJ Antoine	Released: 12 August 2011 (GER); Label: Kontor; Formats: CD, digital download	—	16	77	74	6	BVMI: Gold
Sky Is the Limit	Released: 25 January 2013 (SWI); Label: Phonag; Formats: CD, digital download	1	2	—	—	6	IFPI SWI: Platinum; BVMI: Gold
We Are the Party	Released: 29 August 2014 (SWI); Label: Phonag; Formats: CD, digital download	1	4	—	—	10	
Provocateur	Released: 18 March 2016; Label: Phonag; Formats: CD, digital download	5	13	—	—	26	
The Time Is Now	Released: 9 November 2018; Label: Phonag; Formats: CD, digital download	22	—	—	—	—	
"—" denotes a recording that did not chart or was not released in that territory.

=== Live albums ===
List of live albums, with selected chart positions and certifications
Title	Album details	Peak chart positions	Certifications
Title	Album details	SWI	Certifications
Live in Dubai	Released: 21 September 2005; Label: Muve; Formats: CD, digital download	3	
Live in St. Tropez	Released: 16 June 2006; Label: Muve; Formats: CD, digital download	2	
Live in Moscow	Released: 1 December 2006; Label: Muve; Formats: CD, digital download	3	IFPI SWI: Gold
Live in Bangkok	Released: 28 November 2008 (SWI); Label: Phonag; Formats: CD, digital download	14	

=== Compilation albums ===
List of compilation albums, with selected chart positions
Title	Album details	Peak chart positions
Title	Album details	SWI
Vive la Révolution?	Released: 1 February 2008; Label: Clubstar; Formats: CD, digital download	—
Platinum Collection	Released: 2 March 2012 (SWI); Label: Phonag; Formats: CD, digital download	6
"—" denotes a recording that did not chart or was not released in that territory.

=== Remix albums ===
List of remix albums, with selected chart positions and certifications
Title	Album details	Peak chart positions	Certifications
Title	Album details	SWI	Certifications
Houseworks 01	Released: 6 February 2000; Label: Houseworks; Formats: CD, digital download	18	
@mainstation – Mainstation 01	Released: 25 June 2000; Label: Houseworks; Formats: CD, digital download	10	
DJ Antoine	Released: 6 February 2002; Label: Muve; Formats: CD, digital download	4	IFPI SWI: Platinum
Houseworks Presents Ultraviolet	Released: 3 November 2002; Label: Houseworks; Formats: CD, digital download	6	
Summer Anthems	Released: 13 April 2003; Label: Phonag; Formats: CD, digital download	5	
100%	Released: 22 March 2004; Label: Phonag; Formats: CD, digital download	6	
The Black Album	Released: 3 April 2005; Label: Phonag; Formats: CD, digital download	1	
2008 – Remixed	Released: 2008; Label: Phonag; Formats: CD, digital download	—	
2009 – Remixed	Released: 2009; Label: Phonag; Formats: CD, digital download	—	
2010 – Remixed	Released: 2010; Label: Phonag; Formats: CD, digital download	—	
2011 – Remixed	Released: 26 August 2011 (SWI); Label: Phonag; Formats: CD, digital download	—	
Welcome to DJ Antoine – Remixed	Released: 28 October 2011; Label: Kontor; Formats: CD, digital download	—	
2019 Megamix	Released: 21 June 2019; Label: Kontor; Formats: Digital download, streaming	32	
"—" denotes a recording that did not chart or was not released in that territory.

=== Extended plays ===
- 1999: The Disco Bassline EP
- 2007: Moscow Dyagilev EP (DJ Vini vs. DJ Antoine)

== DVDs ==
Title	Year	Notes
Superhero? •Label: Phonag Records	2009	Released: 12 June 2009

== Singles ==
=== As lead artist ===
List of singles as lead artist, with selected chart positions and certifications, showing year released and album name
Title	Year	Peak chart positions									Certifications	Album
Title	Year	SWI	AUT	BEL (FL)	BEL (WA)	FRA	GER	NL	SPA	SVK	Certifications	Album
"Sound of My Life"	1997	—	—	—	—	—	—	—	—	—		Non-album single
"Visit Me"	1999	—	—	—	—	—	—	—	—	—		Non-album single
"Do It"	1999	—	—	—	—	—	—	—	—	—		Non-album single
"You Make Me Feel"	2000	—	—	—	—	—	—	—	—	—		Non-album single
"Discosensation" (vs. Mad Mark)	2001	70	—	—	—	—	—	—	—	—		Non-album single
"Take It or Leave It" (featuring Eve Gallagher)	2002	70	—	—	—	—	—	—	—	—		DJ Antoine
"All We Need"	2005	40	—	—	—	—	84	—	—	—		The Black Album
"This Time"	2007	45	—	49	—	—	—	—	—	—		Live in Moscow
"Funky Kitchen Club (I'll Remain)"	2008	46	—	—	—	—	—	—	—	—		Stop
"Stop!"	2008	58	—	—	—	—	—	—	—	—		Stop
"Apologize"	2008	16	—	—	—	—	—	—	—	—		Stop
"Can't Fight This Feeling" (vs. Mad Mark)	2008	37	—	—	—	—	—	—	—	—		2008
"Underneath"	2008	59	—	—	—	—	—	—	—	—		2008
"Pump Up the Volume" (vs. Mad Mark)	2008	30	—	—	—	—	—	—	—	—		A Weekend at Hotel Campari
"December"	2009	65	—	—	—	—	—	—	—	—		Live in Bangkok
"In My Dreams"	2009	48	—	—	—	—	—	—	—	—		2009
"I Promised Myself"	2009	40	—	—	—	—	—	—	—	—		2009
"One Day, One Night" (featuring Mish)	2009	20	—	—	—	—	—	—	—	—		Superhero?
"Every Breath"	2009	10	22	—	—	—	—	—	—	—		17900
"S'Beschte" (featuring MC Roby Rob)	2009	95	—	—	—	—	—	—	—	—		17900
"Welcome to St. Tropez" (vs. Timati featuring Kalenna)	2011	2	4	9	17	7	3	10	16	6	IFPI SWI: 3× Platinum; BVMI: 2× Platinum	2011
"Sunlight" (featuring Tom Dice)	2011	10	51	8	43	—	85	93	—	—	IFPI SWI: Gold; BEA: Gold	2011
"Ma Chérie" (featuring The Beat Shakers)	2011	2	2	35	20	73	6	—	—	1	IFPI SWI: 4× Platinum; BVMI: 5× Gold	Welcome to DJ Antoine
"I'm on You" (with Timati, Diddy and Dirty Money)	2012	67	—	40	—	—	50	—	—	—		SWAGG
"Shake 3X" (vs. Rene Rodrigezz featuring MC Yankoo)	2012	—	31	—	—	—	63	—	—	—		2011
"Ma Chérie 2k12" (vs. Mad Mark)	2012	—	—	—	—	7	—	—	—	—		Welcome to DJ Antoine
"Broadway" (vs. Mad Mark)	2012	—	—	—	—	—	94	—	—	41		Welcome to DJ Antoine
"Bella Vita"	2013	1	5	—	66	57	15	91	—	1	IFPI SWI: Platinum; BVMI: Gold	Sky Is the Limit
"Sky Is the Limit" (vs. Mad Mark)	2013	7	8	—	—	—	15	—	—	18		Sky Is the Limit
"House Party" (vs. Mad Mark featuring B-Case and U-Jean)	2013	40	22	—	—	—	44	—	—	—	BVMI: Gold	Sky Is the Limit
"Crazy World" (vs. Mad Mark)	2013	—	63	—	—	—	—	—	—	—		Sky Is the Limit
"We Are FCB Megamix"	2013	63	—	—	—	—	—	—	—	—		Non-album single
"Light It Up"	2014	29	54	—	—	—	53	—	—	81		We Are the Party
"Go with Your Heart" (with Mad Mark featuring Temara Melek and Euro)	2014	50	75	—	—	—	—	—	—	—		We Are the Party
"We Are the Party" (vs. Mad Mark featuring X-Stylez and Two-M)	2014	—	62	—	—	—	—	—	—	—		We Are the Party
"Wild Side" (vs. Mad Mark featuring Jason Walker)	2015	56	—	—	—	—	—	—	—	—		We Are the Party
"Holiday" (featuring Akon)	2015	8	9	46	—	120	18	—	—	13	BVMI: Gold	Provocateur
"Thank You" (featuring Eric Lumaire)	2016	42	75	—	—	—	—	—	—	—		Provocateur
"Weekend Love" (featuring Jay Sean)	2016	23	71	—	—	—	85	—	—	—		Provocateur
"La vie en rose"	2017	47	—	—	—	—	—	—	—	—		The Time Is Now
"I Love Your Smile" (with Dizkodude featuring Sibbyl)	2017	95	—	—	—	—	—	—	—	—		The Time Is Now
"El Paradiso" (featuring Armando and Jimmi the Dealer)	2018	81	—	—	—	—	—	—	—	—		The Time Is Now
"Ole Ole" (featuring Karl Wolf and Fito Blanko)	2018	60	—	—	—	—	—	—	—	—		The Time Is Now
"Yallah Habibi" (featuring Sido and Moe Phoenix)	2018	36	—	—	—	—	67	—	—	—		The Time Is Now
"Shout" (featuring DEADLINE)	2020	—	—	—	—	—	—	—	—	—		Non-album single
"—" denotes a recording that did not chart or was not released in that territory.

== Certifications ==
Gold

- Austria
  - 2011: for the single Welcome to St. Tropez
- Germany
  - 2012: for the album Welcome to DJ Antoine
- Switzerland
  - 2001: for the album Houseworks #2
  - 2002: for the album DJ Antoine
  - 2006: for the album Live in Moscow
  - 2008: for the album 2008
  - 2008: for the album A Weekend at Hotel Campari
  - 2008: for the album Stop!
  - 2009: for the album 2009

Platinum

- Germany
  - 2011: for the single Welcome to St. Tropez
  - 2012: for the single "Ma chérie"
- Switzerland
  - 2011: for the single Welcome to St. Tropez
  - 2012: for the album 2011
  - 2012: for the single "Ma chérie"
  - 2014: for the album Sky Is the Limit
  - 2014: for the single "Bella Vita"

Country	Gold	Platinum
Austria	1	0
Germany	1	2
Switzerland	7	5
Total	9	7
