= List of number-one hits of 2011 (Switzerland) =

This is a list of the Swiss Hitparade number ones of 2011.

== Swiss charts ==
Issue date	Song	Artist	Album	Artist
9 January	"The Time (Dirty Bit)"	The Black Eyed Peas	Heaven – Best of Ballads Part 2	Gotthard
16 January	"Barbra Streisand"	Duck Sauce	Heaven – Best of Ballads Part 2	Gotthard
23 January	"Barbra Streisand"	Duck Sauce	Heaven – Best of Ballads Part 2	Gotthard
30 January	"Barbra Streisand"	Duck Sauce	Doo-Wops & Hooligans	Bruno Mars
6 February	"Rolling in the Deep"	Adele	21	Adele
13 February	"Coming Home"	Diddy-Dirty Money featuring Skylar Grey	21	Adele
20 February	"Grenade"	Bruno Mars	21	Adele
27 February	"Born This Way"	Lady Gaga	Charm School	Roxette
6 March	"Grenade"	Bruno Mars	21	Adele
13 March	"Grenade"	Bruno Mars	Ich schwöru	Sina
20 March	"Born This Way"	Lady Gaga	Collapse into Now	R.E.M.
27 March	"Grenade"	Bruno Mars	2011: Dans l'oeil des Enfoirés	Les Enfoirés
3 April	"Grenade"	Bruno Mars	Schiffsverkehr	Herbert Grönemeyer
10 April	"Grenade"	Bruno Mars	Schiffsverkehr	Herbert Grönemeyer
17 April	"On the Floor"	Jennifer Lopez featuring Pitbull	Schiffsverkehr	Herbert Grönemeyer
24 April	"On the Floor"	Jennifer Lopez featuring Pitbull	Wasting Light	Foo Fighters
1 May	"On the Floor"	Jennifer Lopez featuring Pitbull	Strings 'n' Stripes	The Baseballs
8 May	"On the Floor"	Jennifer Lopez featuring Pitbull	Strings 'n' Stripes	The Baseballs
15 May	"On the Floor"	Jennifer Lopez featuring Pitbull	Strings 'n' Stripes	The Baseballs
22 May	"Call My Name"	Pietro Lombardi	Love?	Jennifer Lopez
29 May	"Call My Name"	Pietro Lombardi	Jenseits von gut und böse	Bushido
5 June	"Party Rock Anthem"	LMFAO featuring Lauren Bennett & GoonRock	Born This Way	Lady Gaga
12 June	"Party Rock Anthem"	LMFAO featuring Lauren Bennett & GoonRock	2011	DJ Antoine
19 June	"Party Rock Anthem"	LMFAO featuring Lauren Bennett & GoonRock	Born This Way	Lady Gaga
26 June	"Party Rock Anthem"	LMFAO featuring Lauren Bennett & GoonRock	Born This Way	Lady Gaga
3 July	"Party Rock Anthem"	LMFAO featuring Lauren Bennett & GoonRock	Born This Way	Lady Gaga
10 July	"Mr. Saxobeat"	Alexandra Stan	4	Beyoncé
17 July	"Mr. Saxobeat"	Alexandra Stan	21	Adele
24 July	"Mr. Saxobeat"	Alexandra Stan	21	Adele
31 July	"Mr. Saxobeat"	Alexandra Stan	21	Adele
7 August	"Mr. Saxobeat"	Alexandra Stan	Back to Black	Amy Winehouse
14 August	"Danza Kuduro"	Lucenzo featuring Don Omar	Back to Black	Amy Winehouse
21 August	"Mr. Saxobeat"	Alexandra Stan	Adya Classic [2011]	Adya
28 August	"Got 2 Luv U"	Sean Paul featuring Alexis Jordan	Watch the Throne	Jay-Z & Kanye West
4 September	"Got 2 Luv U"	Sean Paul featuring Alexis Jordan	Black and White America	Lenny Kravitz
11 September	"Got 2 Luv U"	Sean Paul featuring Alexis Jordan	I'm with You	Red Hot Chili Peppers
18 September	"Got 2 Luv U"	Sean Paul featuring Alexis Jordan	Nothing but the Beat	David Guetta
25 September	"Got 2 Luv U"	Sean Paul featuring Alexis Jordan	Nothing but the Beat	David Guetta
2 October	"New Age"	Marlon Roudette	Nothing but the Beat	David Guetta
9 October	"Turn This Club Around"	R.I.O. featuring U-Jean	The Awakening	James Morrison
16 October	"New Age"	Marlon Roudette	Lago Maggiore	Florian Ast & Francine Jordi
23 October	"New Age"	Marlon Roudette	Renaissance II	Stress
30 October	"We Found Love"	Rihanna featuring Calvin Harris	23	23
6 November	"We Found Love"	Rihanna featuring Calvin Harris	Mylo Xyloto	Coldplay
13 November	"Someone Like You"	Adele	Mylo Xyloto	Coldplay
20 November	"Someone Like You"	Adele	Mylo Xyloto	Coldplay
27 November	"Someone Like You"	Adele	Aura	Kool Savas
4 December	"We Found Love"	Rihanna featuring Calvin Harris	Talk That Talk	Rihanna
11 December	"Hangover"	Taio Cruz featuring Flo Rida	21	Adele
18 December	"Someone Like You"	Adele	Lioness: Hidden Treasures	Amy Winehouse
25 December	"She Doesn't Mind"	Sean Paul	21	Adele

== Romandie charts ==
Issue date	Song	Artist	Album	Artist
9 January	"The Time (Dirty Bit)"	The Black Eyed Peas	Le meilleur des Enfoirés – 20 ans	Les Enfoirés
16 January	"Barbra Streisand"	Duck Sauce	Le meilleur des Enfoirés – 20 ans	Les Enfoirés
23 January	"Over the Rainbow"	Israel Kamakawiwo'ole	Bretonne	Nolwenn Leroy
30 January	"Over the Rainbow"	Israel Kamakawiwo'ole	Putain de stade	Indochine
6 February	"Over the Rainbow"	Israel Kamakawiwo'ole	21	Adele
13 February	"Over the Rainbow"	Israel Kamakawiwo'ole	21	Adele
20 February	"Over the Rainbow"	Israel Kamakawiwo'ole	21	Adele
27 February	"Born This Way"	Lady Gaga	21	Adele
6 March	"Sun Is Up"	Inna	21	Adele
13 March	"Sun Is Up"	Inna	21	Adele
20 March	"On the Floor"	Jennifer Lopez featuring Pitbull	Collapse into Now	R.E.M.
27 March	"On the Floor"	Jennifer Lopez featuring Pitbull	2011: Dans l'oeil des Enfoirés	Les Enfoirés
3 April	"On the Floor"	Jennifer Lopez featuring Pitbull	2011: Dans l'oeil des Enfoirés	Les Enfoirés
10 April	"Just Can't Get Enough"	The Black Eyed Peas	Jamais seul	Johnny Hallyday
17 April	"Just Can't Get Enough"	The Black Eyed Peas	Jamais seul	Johnny Hallyday
24 April	"On the Floor"	Jennifer Lopez featuring Pitbull	Jamais seul	Johnny Hallyday
1 May	"On the Floor"	Jennifer Lopez featuring Pitbull	21	Adele
8 May	"On the Floor"	Jennifer Lopez featuring Pitbull	21	Adele
15 May	"On the Floor"	Jennifer Lopez featuring Pitbull	Let Them Talk	Hugh Laurie
22 May	"Where Them Girls At"	David Guetta featuring Nicki Minaj & Flo Rida	Let Them Talk	Hugh Laurie
29 May	"On the Floor"	Jennifer Lopez featuring Pitbull	Let Them Talk	Hugh Laurie
5 June	"Party Rock Anthem"	LMFAO featuring Lauren Bennett & GoonRock	Born This Way	Lady Gaga
12 June	"Party Rock Anthem"	LMFAO featuring Lauren Bennett & GoonRock	Born This Way	Lady Gaga
19 June	"Party Rock Anthem"	LMFAO featuring Lauren Bennett & GoonRock	Born This Way	Lady Gaga
26 June	"Party Rock Anthem"	LMFAO featuring Lauren Bennett & GoonRock	Born This Way	Lady Gaga
3 July	"Party Rock Anthem"	LMFAO featuring Lauren Bennett & GoonRock	Born This Way	Lady Gaga
10 July	"Party Rock Anthem"	LMFAO featuring Lauren Bennett & GoonRock	4	Beyoncé Knowles
17 July	"Party Rock Anthem"	LMFAO featuring Lauren Bennett & GoonRock	21	Adele
24 July	"Party Rock Anthem"	LMFAO featuring Lauren Bennett & GoonRock	21	Adele
31 July	"Party Rock Anthem"	LMFAO featuring Lauren Bennett & GoonRock	21	Adele
7 August	"Give Me Everything"	Pitbull featuring Ne-Yo, Nayer & Afrojack	Back to Black	Amy Winehouse
14 August	"Man Down"	Rihanna	Back to Black	Amy Winehouse
21 August	"Man Down"	Rihanna	21	Adele
28 August	"Got 2 Luv U"	Sean Paul featuring Alexis Jordan	21	Adele
4 September	"Got 2 Luv U"	Sean Paul featuring Alexis Jordan	21	Adele
11 September	"Elle me dit"	Mika	I'm with You	Red Hot Chili Peppers
18 September	"Elle me dit"	Mika	Nothing but the Beat	David Guetta
25 September	"Elle me dit"	Mika	Tomorrow May Not Be Better	Bastian Baker
2 October	"Elle me dit"	Mika	21	Adele
9 October	"Elle me dit"	Mika	21	Adele
16 October	"Rain Over Me"	Pitbull featuring Marc Anthony	21	Adele
23 October	"Someone Like You"	Adele	21	Adele
30 October	"Someone Like You"	Adele	21	Adele
6 November	"Someone Like You"	Adele	Mylo Xyloto	Coldplay
13 November	"Someone Like You"	Adele	Mylo Xyloto	Coldplay
20 November	"Someone Like You"	Adele	21	Adele
27 November	"Someone Like You"	Adele	21	Adele
4 December	"Someone Like You"	Adele	21	Adele
11 December	"Someone Like You"	Adele	21	Adele
18 December	"Someone Like You"	Adele	Lioness: Hidden Treasures	Amy Winehouse
