= Swiss Music Awards =

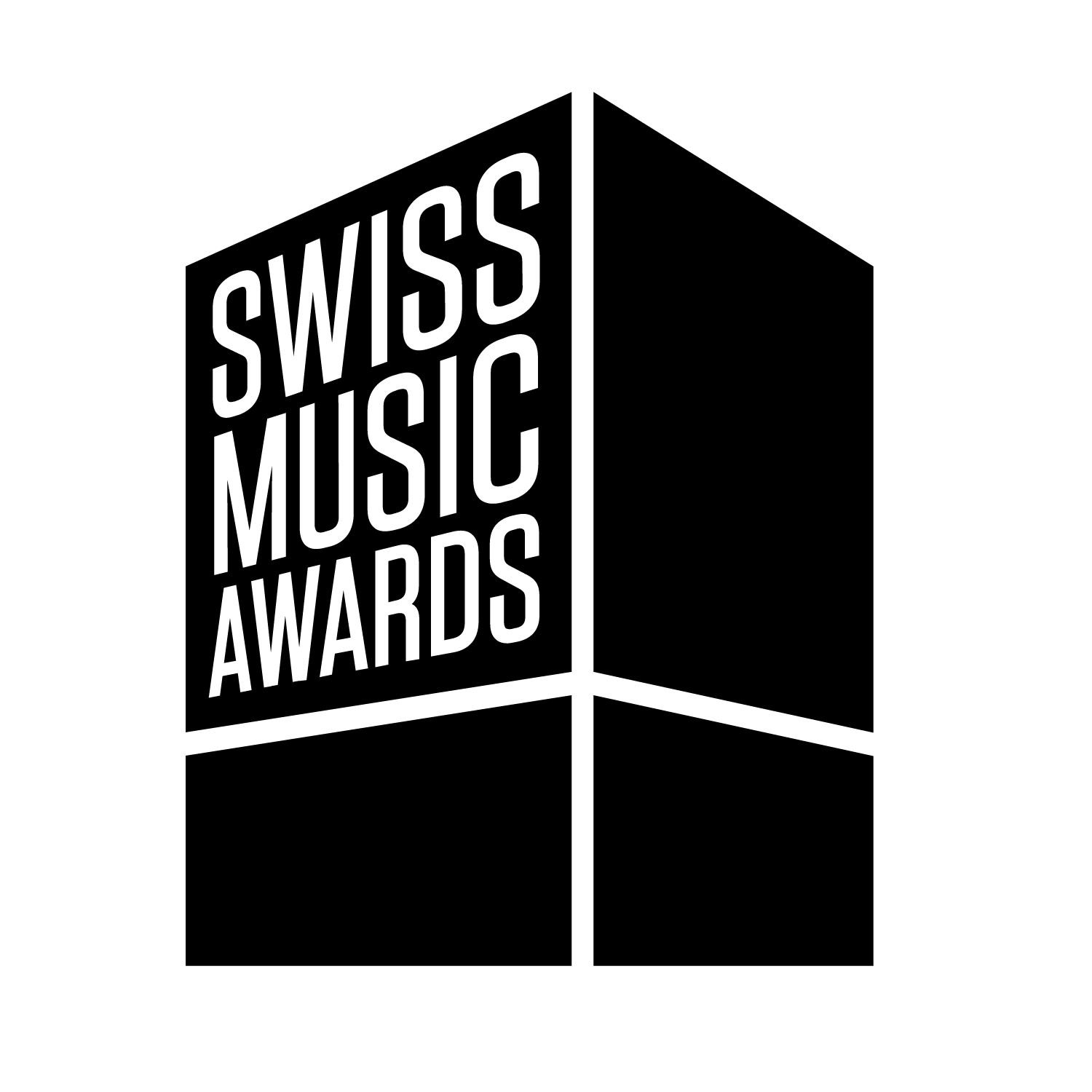
- Awarded for: Music achievements
- Country: Switzerland
- First award: 2008; 18 years ago
- Website: swissmusicawards.ch

The Swiss Music Awards (SMA) is Switzerland's largest award ceremony for music, and serves to promote the national music scene and showcase its cultural diversity. The event allows newcomers to introduce their music to a broader public, while also honouring the accomplishments of the country's most successful musicians. The show is broadcast live.

== Winners ==
=== 2008 ===
Category	Winner
Best National Song	"On n’a q’une terre" by Stress
Best International Song	"Umbrella" by Rihanna feat. Jay-Z
Best National Pop/Rock Album	Domino Effect by Gotthard
Best International Pop/Rock Album	Loose by Nelly Furtado
Best National Urban Album	Renaissance by Stress
Best International Urban Album	As I Am by Alicia Keys
Best National Newcomer	Redwood
Best International Newcomer	Amy Winehouse
Best National Dance Album	Variété (The Show) by DJ Tatana
Best National Music Video	"Mais où?" by Stress

=== 2009 ===
Category	Winner
Best National Song	"My Man Is a Mean Man" by Stefanie Heinzmann
Best International Song	"This Is the Life" by Amy Macdonald
Best National Pop/Rock Album	Haubi Songs by Züri West
Best International Pop/Rock Album	This Is the Life by Amy Macdonald
Best National Urban Album	0816 by Bligg
Best International Urban Album	Ich und meine Maske by Sido
Best National Newcomer	Stefanie Heinzmann
Best International Newcomer	Leona Lewis
Best National Dance Album	Stop! by DJ Antoine
Best National Live Act	Züri West

=== 2010 ===
Category	Winner
Best National Song	"Tous les mêmes" by Stress feat. Karolyn
Best International Song	"Poker Face" by Lady Gaga
Best National Pop/Rock Album	Touch Yello by Yello
Best International Pop/Rock Album	Funhouse by Pink
Best National Urban Album	Des rois, des pions et des fous by Stress
Best International Urban Album	The E.N.D. by The Black Eyed Peas
Best National Newcomer	Pegasus
Best International Newcomer	Milow
Best National Dance Album	2009 by DJ Antoine
Jury Award	"Und jetz … was hät das mit mir z tue?" by Big Zis
Outstanding Achievement	Yello

=== 2011 ===
Category	Winner
Best National Hit	"Legändä & Heldä" by Bligg
Best International Hit	"Waka Waka (This Time for Africa)" by Shakira
Best National Pop/Rock Album	Herz by Adrian Stern
Best International Pop/Rock Album	A Curious Thing by Amy Macdonald
Best National Urban Album	Bart aber herzlich by Bligg
Best International Urban Album	Recovery by Eminem
Best National Dance Album	No Superstar by Remady
Best National Breaking Act	Caroline Chevin
Best International Breaking Act	Unheilig
Best National Talent	Steff la Cheffe
Outstanding Achievement	Polo Hofer
Tribute Award	Steve Lee

=== 2012 ===
Category	Winner
Best National Hit	"Up in the Sky" by 77 Bombay Street
Best International Hit	"Rolling in the Deep" by Adele
Best National Pop/Rock Album	Up in the Sky by 77 Bombay Street
Best International Pop/Rock Album	21 by Adele
Best National Urban Album	Renaissance II by Stress
Best International Urban Album	Planet Pit by Pitbull
Best National Dance Album	2011 by DJ Antoine
Best National Breaking Act	Bastian Baker
Best International Breaking Act	Bruno Mars
Best National Talent	Dabu Fantastic
Outstanding Achievement	Andreas Vollenweider

=== 2013 ===
Category	Winner
Best National Hit	"Skyline" by Pegasus
Best International Hit	"Call Me Maybe" by Carly Rae Jepsen
Best National Pop/Rock Album	Johnny - The Rimini Flashdown Part II by Patent Ochsner
Best International Pop/Rock Album	Ballast der Republik by Die Toten Hosen
Best National Urban Album	Noël's Room by Stress, Noah Veraguth and Bastian Baker
Best International Urban Album	Raop by Cro
Best National Dance Album	The Original by Remady & Manu-L
Best National Breaking Act	Luca Hänni
Best International Breaking Act	Emeli Sandé
Best National Talent	Hecht
Best National Live Act	Stress
Best Romandie Act	Bastian Baker
Tribute Award	Claude Nobs

=== 2014 ===
Category	Winner
Best National Hit	"Mundart" by Bligg
Best International Hit	"Get Lucky" by Daft Punk feat. Pharrell Williams
Best National Pop/Rock Album	Too Old to Die Young by Bastian Baker
Best International Pop/Rock Album	All the Little Lights by Passenger
Best National Urban Album	Service publigg by Bligg
Best International Urban Album	The Marshall Mathers LP 2 by Eminem
Best National Breaking Act	Nicole Bernegger
Best International Breaking Act	Macklemore & Ryan Lewis
Best International Album	Racine carrée by Stromae
Best National Dance Album	Green by Mr. Da-Nos
Best National Talent	Yokko
Best National Live Act	Eluveitie
Best Romandie Act	Bastian Baker
Outstanding Achievement	Züri West

=== 2015 ===
Category	Winner
Best Female Solo Act	Beatrice Egli
Best Male Solo Act	Philipp Fankhauser
Best Group	Lo & Leduc
Best Breaking Act	James Gruntz
Best Live Act	Lo & Leduc
Best Talent	Lo & Leduc
Best Romandie Act	Stress
Best Album	Bang! by Gotthard
Best Hit	"I Take It All" by Pegasus
Best International Act	Ed Sheeran
Best International Breaking Act	Imagine Dragons
Best International Album	Ghost Stories by Coldplay
Best International Hit	"Happy" by Pharrell Williams
Artist Award	James Gruntz
Outstanding Achievement	Krokus
Tribute Award	Udo Jürgens

=== 2016 ===
Category	Winner
Best Female Solo Act	Stefanie Heinzmann
Best Male Solo Act	Bastian Baker
Best Group	Patent Ochsner
Best Breaking Act	Dodo
Best Live Act	Patent Ochsner
Best Talent	Damian Lynn
Best Romandie Act	Bastian Baker
Best Album	Finitolavoro – The Rimini Flashdown Part 3 by Patent Ochsner
Best Hit	"Waiting" by Nickless
Best International Act	Adele
Best International Breaking Act	Sam Smith
Best International Album	25 by Adele
Best Hit International	"Are You with Me" by Lost Frequencies
Artist Award	Sophie Hunger
Outstanding Achievement	Peter Reber

=== 2017 ===
Category	Winner
Best Female Solo Act	Beatrice Egli
Best Male Solo Act	Trauffer
Best Group	Schluneggers Heimweh
Best Breaking Act	Schluneggers Heimweh
Best Live Act	Hecht
Best Talent	Nemo
Best Romandie Act	Mark Kelly
Best Album	Heiterefahne by Trauffer
Best Hit	"Angelina" by Dabu Fantastic
Best International Act	Coldplay
Best International Breaking Act	Álvaro Soler
Best International Album	A Head Full of Dreams by Coldplay
Best International Hit	"Faded" by Alan Walker
Artist Award	Seven
Outstanding Achievement	DJ BoBo
Tribute Award	Mani Matter

=== 2018 ===
Category	Winner
Best Female Solo Act	Eliane
Best Male Solo Act	Nemo
Best Group	Züri West
Best Breaking Act	Nemo
Best Live Act	Nemo
Best Talent	Crimer
Best Romandie Act	Danitsa
Best Album	Love by Züri West
Best Hit	"Du" by Nemo
Best International Solo Act	Ed Sheeran
Best International Group	Imagine Dragons
Best International Breaking Act	Rag'n'Bone Man
Best International Hit	"Shape of You" by Ed Sheeran
Artist Award	Faber
Tribute Award	Martin Ain

=== 2019 ===
Category	Winner
Best Female Solo Act	Steff la Cheffe
Best Male Solo Act	Bligg
Best Group	Lo & Leduc
Best Breaking Act	Härz
Best Live Act	The Gardener & the Tree
Best Talent	Marius Bear
Best Romandie Act	Emilie Zoé
Best Album	KombiNation by Bligg
Best Hit	"Adiós" by Loco Escrito
Best International Solo Act	Eminem
Best International Group	Imagine Dragons
Best International Breaking Act	Camila Cabello
Best International Hit	"Échame la Culpa" by Luis Fonsi & Demi Lovato
Artist Award	Black Sea Dahu
Outstanding Achievement	Sina

=== 2020 ===
Category	Winner
Best Female Act	Stefanie Heinzmann
Best Male Act	Luca Hänni
Best Group	Patent Ochsner
Best Breaking Act	Loredana
Best Live Act	Hecht
Best Talent	Monet192
Best Romandie Act	Muthoni Drummer Queen
Best Album	Cut Up by Patent Ochsner
Best Hit	"Punto" by Loco Escrito
Best International Solo Act	Billie Eilish
Best International Group	Rammstein
Best International Breaking Act	Billie Eilish
Best International Hit	"Shallow" by Lady Gaga & Bradley Cooper
Artist Award	Baze
Outstanding Achievement	Stephan Eicher

=== 2021 ===
Category	Winner
Best Female Act	Beatrice Egli
Best Male Act	Loco Escrito
Best Group	Gotthard
Best Breaking Act	Megawatt
Best Live Act	Hecht
Best Talent	Caroline Alves
Best Romandie Act	Arma Jackson
Best Album	Zämehäbe by Heimweh
Best Hit	"Ámame" by Loco Escrito
Best International Solo Act	The Weeknd
Best International Group	AC/DC
Best International Breaking Act	Ava Max
Best International Hit	"Blinding Lights" by The Weeknd
Artist Award	Trummer
Outstanding Achievement	Patent Ochsner
