= Seven Mountains =

Seven Mountains may refer to:

- Seven Mountains, Bergen, seven mountains surrounding the Norwegian city of Bergen
- Seven Mountains (album), 2015 album by Swiss band 77 Bombay Street
  - "Seven Mountains" (song), title track and 2015 single by 77 Bombay Street from the same titled album Seven Mountains
- Bảy Núi, also known as Thất Sơn, both of which mean "seven mountains" in Vietnamese

== See also ==
- Seven Devils Mountains, notable peaks in west central Idaho in the Hells Canyon Wilderness
- Suzuka Seven Mountains, main peaks of the Suzuka Mountains in Japan
- Suite for the Seven Mountains, 2008 debut album by Norwegian saxophonist Marius Neset
- Seven Mountains Media, American media company owning number of country music radio stations mostly in Pennsylvania
- The Seven Storey Mountain, 1948 autobiography of the Trappist monk Thomas Merton
- Seven Mountain Mandate, a dominionist movement within evangelical Christianity
