= Up in the Sky =

Up in the Sky may refer to:

- "Up in the Sky", a song by Oasis from their 1994 album Definitely Maybe
- "Up in the Sky" (album), a 2011 album by 77 Bombay Street, or the title track
- "Up in the Sky", a song by Joe Satriani song from his 1998 album Crystal Planet
