= Lo & Leduc =

Swiss rap group

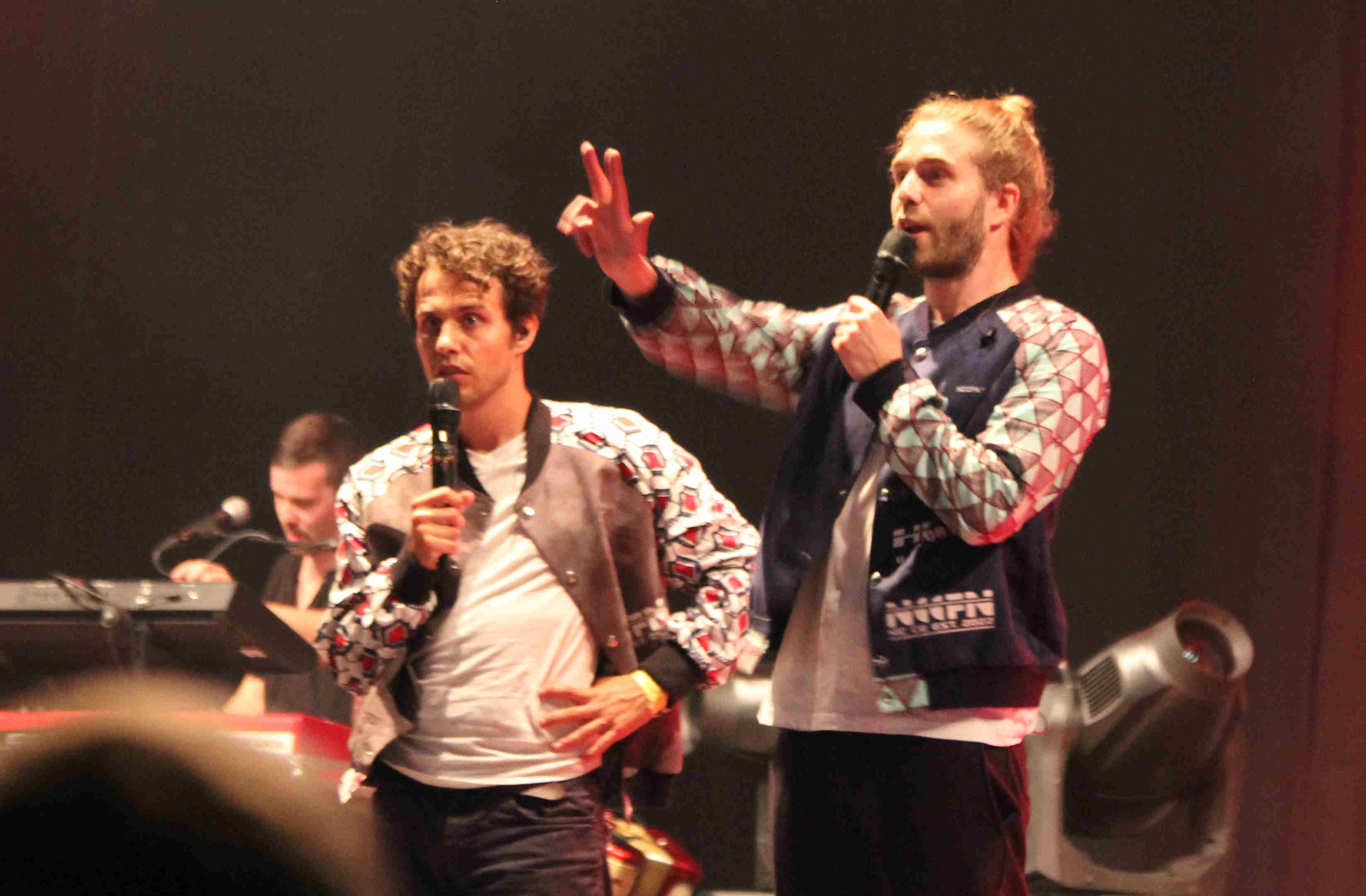
Lo & Leduc at the Bardentreffen in Nuremberg 2018

Lo & Leduc are a Swiss rap group from Bern. They broke through with a 2014 album called Zucker fürs Volk, or "Sugar for the People".

== Career ==
=== In Pacomé ===
Lo und Leduc started in the middle of 2005 as a Bernese dialect group known as Pacomé. In 2007, the four-piece band's singer Luc Oggier had voice problems for half a year, and Lorenz Häberli was brought on as a substitute. He thereafter remained with the group as a permanent member.

Pacomé published its first album in 2009. There were leftover songs that the two rappers, known as Lo & Luc, published "Update 1.0" as a free download. Just six months later, "Update 2.0" was released for free on the internet as well. Their third Update was released in 2012 with music designed to be more danceable. "Update 3.0" was freely available on the internet, and with songs like Räuber u Poli, was a success.

Also in 2012, Lo & Leduc began planning their first commercial album. Besides Music, the pair studied German and History. They collaborated with Dodo, another Swiss singer who had previously collaborated with Steff la Cheffe. It would take until the spring of 2014 for the album to be finished. With the release of the first single from the album, All die Büecher, they came in at No. 42 on the Swiss Hitparade. The album Zucker fürs Volk was released in April 2014, and rose to #2 on the charts within a week. It remained in the charts throughout the year, and in early 2015, went back into the top ten after the release of Jung verdammt (Condemned Young), which was a #3 hit. The album reached gold status.

In the 2015 Swiss Music Awards, Lo & Leduc were the performers with the most nominations (Best Group, Best Live Act and Best Talent). They won the award in all three categories, the second group to get all three in one year after Stress in 2008.

== Members ==
- Lo (Lorenz Häberli, born 25 September 1986)

Lo started as a rap battler and was the first to win the renowned "Ultimate MC Battle" in Bern three times. He was also a guest on albums by Tommy Vercetti.

- Leduc (Luc Oggier, born 25 February 1989)

Leduc won an award at the talent competition Stammplatz for composing the title song of the Pacomé album Küste vo Bern. He also works as a music teacher.

== Discography ==
=== Albums ===
Title	Year	Peak positions	Certification
Title	Year	SWI	Certification
Zucker fürs Volk	2014	1	
Ingwer und Ewig	2017	2	
Hype	2019	5	
Mercato	2022	2	
Krise als Chanson	2026	5	

=== Mixtapes ===
Title	Year	Peak positions	Certification
Title	Year	SWI	Certification
Update 1.0	2009	–	
Update 2.0	2010	–	
Update 3.0 fin de siècle	2012	–	
Update 4.0	2018	19	

=== Singles ===
Title	Year	Peak positions	Album
Title	Year	SWI	Album
"All die Büecher"	2014	40	
"Jung verdammt"	2014	2	
"Blaui Peperoni"	2015	41	
"Bini bi dir"	2015	59	
"Chapeau" (with Seven)	2016	43	
"Mis Huus dis Huus"	2017	13	
"Erfunde"	2017	68	
"Für Ingwer und Ewig"	2017	67	
"Chileli vo Wasse"	2017	17	
"079"	2017	1	
"Lug wi mir flüge"	2017	100	
"Im erschte Tram"	2017	39	
"Online"	2019	8	
"Tribut"	2020	4	

=== Featured in ===
Title	Year	Peak positions	Album
Title	Year	SWI	Album
"1" (SAD feat. Büne Huber, Lo & Leduc)	2012	68	
"Dynamite" (Ira May | Noah Veraguth | Lo & Leduc)	2014	21	
