= Rosalie (song) =

2008 song by Bligg

Single by Bligg

from the album 0816
- Language: German
- Released: October 10, 2008
- Genre: Hip-hop
- Length: 3:02
- Label: Universal
- Songwriters: Roman Camenzind, Marco Bliggensdorfer, Fred Herrmann, Walter Alder

"Rosalie" is a song by Bligg, a Swiss rapper. The lyrics were written by Roman Camenzind, Marco Bliggensdorfer (Bligg), Fred Herrmann, and Walter Alder. "Rosalie" entered the Swiss hit-parade at number 21 on 26 October 2008, and it was at number 5 for two weeks.

The song is about a handsome seller of roses, who walks from table to table in a small café and tells lonely girls how pretty they are and how much they deserve a rose until he reveals that they actually cost something.

== Charts ==
=== Weekly charts ===
Chart (2008–09)	Peak position
Switzerland (Schweizer Hitparade)	5

=== Year-end charts ===
Chart (2008)	Position
Switzerland (Schweizer Hitparade)	63
Chart (2009)	Position
Switzerland (Schweizer Hitparade)	10
