= Seven Mountains (album) =

Studio album by 77 Bombay Street
- Released: 18 September 2015
- Recorded: 2013–2015
- Genre: Folk rock, indie rock
- Label: Gadget Records

77 Bombay Street chronology
Oko Town (2012)	Seven Mountains (2015)

Singles from Seven Mountains
- 1. "Seven Mountains" Released: 16 June 2015; 2. "Once and Only" Released: 2015; 3. "Bombay" Released: 2016

Seven Mountains is the fourth album of Swiss folk rock and indie rock band 77 Bombay Street released 18 September 2015 after their self-financed independent album Dead Bird in 2009 and their two studio albums Up in the Sky in 2011 and Oko Town in 2012. The four Buchli brothers started writing the songs in Berline, Germany before moving to Australia to add new songs to the album. The album was recorded in Linear Recording Studios and produced by Chris Vallejo, its founder.

The single "Seven Mountains" was pre-released on 16 June 2015 in preparation for the launching of the album. The follow-up singles were "Once and Only" and "Bombay", all three accompanied by music videos.

The album reached the top of the Schweizer Hitparade, the official Swiss Albums Chart becoming their second consecutive chart topping release in Switzerland as the previous album Oko Town also made it to number 1. The album was certified platinum.

== Track listing ==
No.	Title	Writer(s)	Length
1.	"Prelude"	Matt Buchli; Joe Buchli; Esra Buchli; Simri-Ramon Buchli	1:14
2.	"Seven Mountains"	Matt Buchli	4:03
3.	"Club of Optimistic People"	Matt Buchli	4:21
4.	"Painted"	Matt Buchli	3:58
5.	"Bombay"	Joe Buchli; Matt Buchli	3:23
6.	"Falling"	Esra Buchli	4:24
7.	"Intermezzo"	Matt Buchli; Joe Buchli; Esra Buchli; Simri-Ramon Buchli	0:36
8.	"Once and Only"	Matt Buchli	3:27
9.	"Amazing Day"	Simri-Ramon Buchli	3:27
10.	"Where Are You"	Esra Buchli	3:36
11.	"December"	Simri-Ramon Buchli	3:20
12.	"Waterproof"	Matt Buchli	2:52
13.	"Dancing on the Coast"	Matt Buchli	5:30
14.	"Own the World (bonus track)"	Matt Buchli	3:25
15.	"Finale"	Matt Buchli; Joe Buchli; Esra Buchli; Simri-Ramon Buchli	0:27
Total length:			48:03

== Charts ==
=== Weekly charts ===
Chart (2015–2016)	Peak position
Swiss Albums (Schweizer Hitparade)	1

=== Year-end charts ===
Chart (2015)	Position
Swiss Albums (Schweizer Hitparade)	31
