= Oko Town (album) =

Studio album by 77 Bombay Street
- Released: 5 June 2012
- Recorded: 2011–2012
- Genre: Folk rock, indie rock
- Length: 51:49
- Label: Gadget Records

77 Bombay Street chronology
Up in the Sky (2011)	Oko Town (2012)	Seven Mountains (2015)

Singles from Oko Town
- 1. "Low on Air" Released: 2012; 2. "Angel" Released: 2013; 3. "Follow the Rain" Released: 2014

Oko Town is the third album of Swiss folk rock and indie rock band 77 Bombay Street released 5 October 2012 after their self-financed independent album Dead Bird in 2009 and their studio album Up in the Sky in 2011. It was released on Gadget Records.

The single "Low on Air" was released on 17 August 2012 and the follow-up singles were "Angel" and "Follow the Rain".

The album reached the top of the Schweizer Hitparade, the official Swiss Albums Chart becoming their first chart topping release in Switzerland. The album was certified platinum.

== Track listing ==
No.	Title	Writer(s)	Lead vocals	Length
1.	"Follow the Rain"	77 Bombay Street; Thomas Fessler	Matt Buchli	3:31
2.	"Planet Earth"	77 Bombay Street; Thomas Fessler	Joe Buchli	3:17
3.	"Wake Me Up"	77 Bombay Street; Thomas Fessler	Matt Buchli	3:40
4.	"Low on Air"	77 Bombay Street; Thomas Fessler	Simri-Ramon Buchli	4:15
5.	"Garden"	77 Bombay Street; Thomas Fessler	Matt Buchli	3:48
6.	"Oko Town"	77 Bombay Street; Thomas Fessler	Simri-Ramon Buchli	2:58
7.	"Clown"	77 Bombay Street; Thomas Fessler	Esra Buchli	3:46
8.	"Angel"	77 Bombay Street; Thomas Fessler	Matt Buchli	4:10
9.	"Seeker"	77 Bombay Street; Thomas Fessler	Matt Buchli	4:01
10.	"Indian"	77 Bombay Street; Thomas Fessler	Simri-Ramon Buchli	3:44
11.	"Rainbow"	77 Bombay Street; Thomas Fessler	Joe Buchli	3:24
12.	"Gladiator"	77 Bombay Street; Thomas Fessler	Simri-Ramon Buchli	3:47
13.	"Johnny"	77 Bombay Street; Thomas Fessler	Matt Buchli	3:35
14.	"Gotta Get Home"	77 Bombay Street; Thomas Fessler	Matt Buchli	3:53
Total length:				51:49

== Charts ==
=== Weekly charts ===
Chart (2012–2013)	Peak position
Swiss Albums (Schweizer Hitparade)	1

=== Year-end charts ===
Chart (2012)	Position
Swiss Albums (Schweizer Hitparade)	19
Chart (2013)	Position
Swiss Albums (Schweizer Hitparade)	62
