= 77 Bombay Street =

Swiss folk rock band

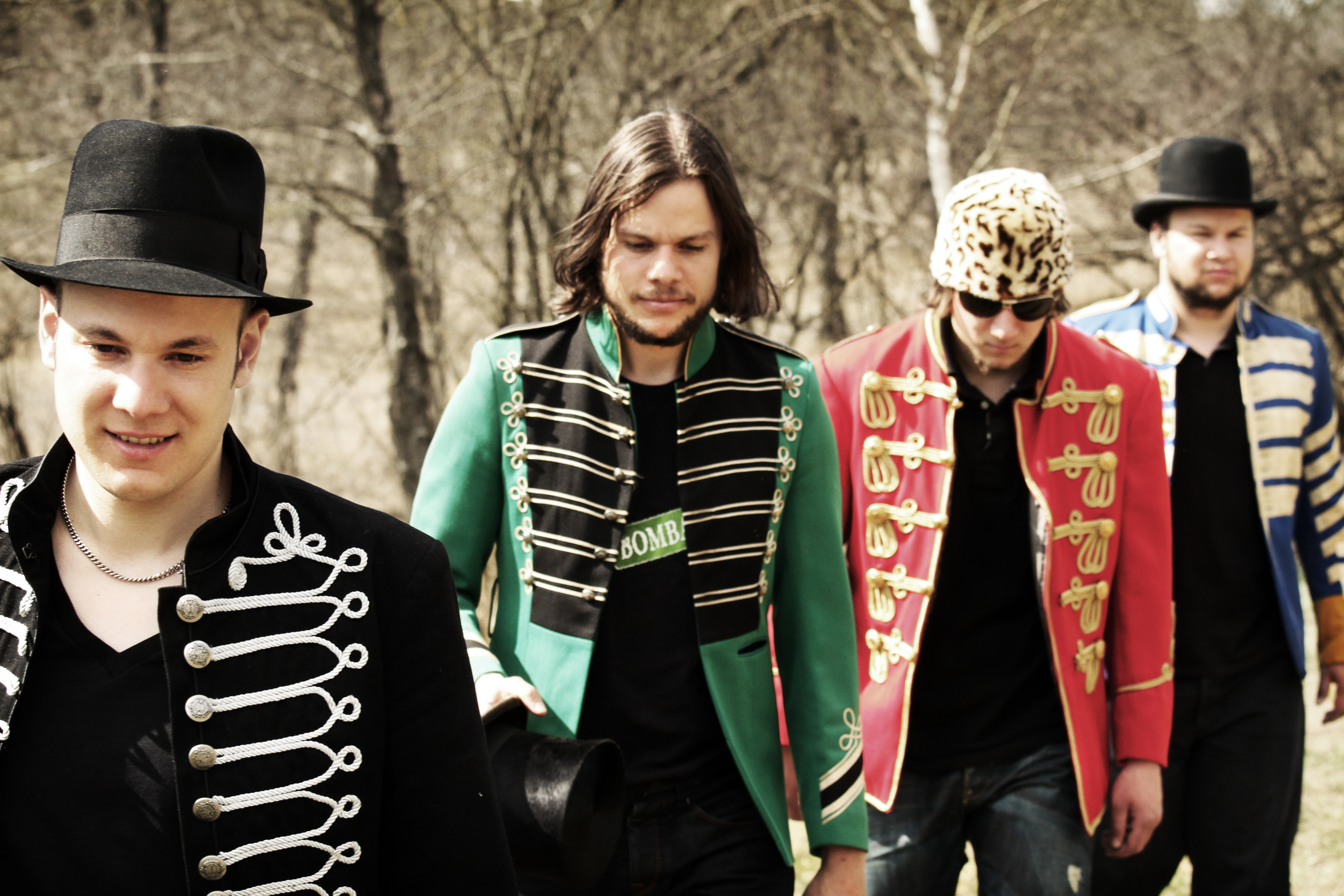
- Four brothers left to right: Joe, Matt, Simri-Ramon and Esra

Background information
- Origin: Scharans, Graubünden, Switzerland
- Genres: Indie rock, folk rock, alternative rock
- Years active: 2008–present
- Labels: Gadget
- Members: Matt Buchli; Joe Buchli; Simri-Ramon Buchli; Esra Buchli
- Website: 77bombaystreet.com

77 Bombay Street is a Swiss folk rock musical group that was formed in 2008 in Scharans, canton Graubünden. It consists of four brothers Matt, Joe, Simri-Ramon and Esra Buchli. The band was named after their temporary home in Adelaide, Australia, where the whole Buchli family lived for two years. As of 2021, the band had released five studio albums, the first called Dead Bird self-released, the next three Up in the Sky, Oko Town and Seven Mountains in association with Gadget Records. In 2021, they released their fifth album, Start Over.

Both Up in the Sky (2011) and Oko Town (2012) went platinum in Switzerland, the former peaking at the third place, the latter hitting the top of Schweizer Hitparade, the official Swiss Albums Chart. According to their official Facebook site in 2014, the band was working on their fourth studio album. In an interview Matt Buchli said "Yes, we are busy writing new songs and we've got a feeling it will be fantastic! Every album is a new and great challenge."

In 2012, the band won two Swiss Music Awards with album Up in the Sky and its title track "Up in the Sky" for Best Album Pop/Rock National and Best Hit National, respectively. In 2015, the band worked on their fourth studio album, Seven Mountains, which was released in fall 2015. In summer 2021, the album Start Over was published.

== Band members ==
- Matt Buchli – lead vocals, background vocals, acoustic guitar
- Simri-Ramon Buchli – vocals, background vocals, bass
- Joe Buchli– vocals, background vocals, electric guitar
- Esra Buchli – vocals, drums

== Discography ==
=== Albums ===
Year	Album	Peak positions	Certification
Year	Album	SWI	Certification
2009	Dead Bird	–	
2011	Up in the Sky	3	Platinum
2012	Oko Town	1	Platinum
2015	Seven Mountains	1	Gold
2021	Start Over	4	

=== Singles ===
Year	Single	Peak positions	Certification	Album
Year	Single	SWI	Certification	Album
2010	"47 Millionaires"	–		Up in the Sky
2011	"Long Way"	55		Up in the Sky
2011	"Up in the Sky"	7		Up in the Sky
2011	"I Love Lady Gaga"	19		Up in the Sky
2012	"Low on Air"	19		Oko Town
2013	"Angel"	–		Oko Town
2014	"Follow the Rain"	66		Oko Town
2015	"Seven Mountains"	–		Seven Mountains
2016	"Bombay"	–		Seven Mountains
2016	"Empire"	11		–
2021	"Drifters in the Wind"	–		Start Over
2021	"Karaoke Girl"	–		Start Over
2021	"Train Home"	–		Start Over
2021	"Fox"	–		Start Over
2021	"Eugene"	–		Start Over
2021	"Start Over"	–		Start Over
2021	"Middle of My World"	–		Start Over
