= Tomorrow May Not Be Better =

Studio album by Bastian Baker
- Released: 9 September 2011 (Switzerland)
- Recorded: 2011
- Genre: Pop, Rock
- Label: Phonag Records

Singles from Tomorrow May Not Be Better
- 1. "I'd Sing For You" Released: 2011; 2. "Lucky" Released: 2011; 3. "Tomorrow May Not Be Better" Released: 2011

Tomorrow May Not Be Better - Platinum Edition (2012)

Tomorrow May Not Be Better is the debut album by Swiss singer-songwriter Bastian Baker. It was released in Switzerland on 9 September 2011 on Phonag record label. Three singles were released from the album, "I'd Sing for You", "Lucky" and the title track "Tomorrow May Not Be Better"

After the success of Baker, the album was rereleased in a Platinum Edition containing additional tracks and was released in both Switzerland and France simultaneously with three additional bonus tracks including "We'll Follow You" the Official Swiss Davis Cup Team Song.

== Track list (2011) ==
1. "Colorful Hospital" (3:52)
2. "I'd Sing For You" (3:24)
3. "Lucky" (3:31)
4. "Nobody Should Die Alone" (4:00)
5. "Tomorrow May Not Be Better" (3:00)
6. "I Still Don't Realize" (4:43)
7. "Having Fun" (4:27)
8. "Smile" (3:32)
9. "With You Gone" (4:41)
10. "Planet Earth" (5:04)
11. "Love Machine" (4:26)
12. Blank (0:06)
13. "Song About a Priest" (7:40)

== Track list – platinum edition (2012) ==
1. "Colorful Hospital" (3:52)
2. "I'd Sing For You" (3:24)
3. "Lucky" (3:31)
4. "Nobody Should Die Alone" (4:00)
5. "Tomorrow May Not Be Better" (3:00)
6. "I Still Don't Realize" (4:43)
7. "Having Fun" (4:27)
8. "Smile" (3:32)
9. "With You Gone" (4:41)
10. "Planet Earth" (5:04)
11. "Love Machine" (4:26)
12. "Song About a Priest" (7:40)

Bonus Tracks

- 13. "Tomorrow May Not Be Better (Live Acoustic Version)" (4:38)
- 14. "The Road" (feat. Aliose) (3:55)
- 15. "We'll Follow You" (Official Swiss Davis Cup Team Song) (2:57)

== Charts ==
=== Weekly charts ===
Chart (2011–13)	Peak position
Belgian Albums (Ultratop Wallonia)	13
French Albums (SNEP)	59
Swiss Albums (Schweizer Hitparade)	3

=== Year-end charts ===
Chart (2011)	Position
Swiss Albums (Schweizer Hitparade)	53
Chart (2012)	Position
French Albums (SNEP)	199
Swiss Albums (Schweizer Hitparade)	16
Chart (2013)	Position
Belgian Albums (Ultratop Wallonia)	158
Swiss Albums (Schweizer Hitparade)	93
