= Bligg =

Swiss rapper (born 1976)

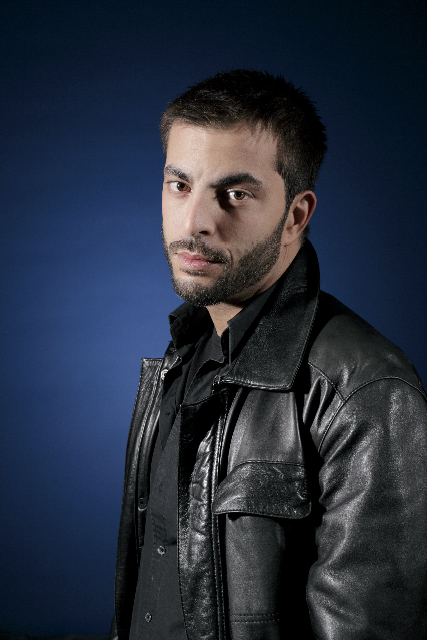

Background information
- Born: Marco Bliggensdorfer; 30 September 1976 (age 50); Zurich, Switzerland
- Genre: Rap
- Years active: 1995–present
- Formerly of: Bligg'n'Lexx

Marco Bliggensdorfer (born 30 September 1976, in Zurich), professionally known as Bligg, is a Swiss rapper. His albums 0816 and Bart Aber Herzlich reached the spot on the Swiss charts; four of his other albums have peaked the Top 20. In 1999 and 2000, he was part of the duo Bligg'n'Lexx with rapper and producer Lexx, releasing one album together.

== Career ==
=== Beginnings ===
At the age of 16, Bligg began freestyling. In 1995, he released a limited EP, Zürislang Freistiil, which was the first opportunity to really hear him rapping.

=== Bligg'n'Lexx ===
Bligg'n'Lexx
- Origin: Switzerland
- Genre: Rap
- Years active: 1998-2001
- Past members: Bligg (Marco Bliggensdorfer); Lexx (Alex Storrer)

Three years later, Bliggensdorfer met Alex Storrer, a producer and rapper known as Lexx. Forming a hip hop duo, the two worked together on Chocolate, Cheese and Sounds. In 1999, they released their first single, called Schnitzeljagd under the name Bligg'n'Lexx. The single was remixed by DJ Cutmando, whom the pair met while touring. Ever since then, DJ Cutmando has worked with Bligg multiple times.

In 2000, Bligg'n'Lexx collaborated with Pete Penicka to release the single Du & Ich from the Bligg'n'Lexx debut and only studio album Nahdisnah. The album received positive reviews and increased the group's popularity.

=== Solo career ===
Bligg also started working on additional songs and was signed as a separate act to Universal Switzerland. In 2001, Bligg released his first solo album, entitled Normal, which reached #20 on the Swiss charts. He worked with hip-hop artists Spooman, Lexx (his partner in Bligg'n'Lexx) and with Stress, as well as the American rap group The Alkaholiks. In Another song, the soul musician Emel was included, whom Bligg had known for a while.

The songs Alles scho mal ghört and Relaxtra reached the Swiss Singles Chart Top 20. Alles scho mal ghört remained on the charts for 16 weeks, eventually reaching #7. In 2002, Relaxtra was released as an EP for a second time.

After the release of Normal, Bligg ended his relationship with Universal and signed with Nation Music. In 2004, he released his second album, entitled Odyssey. On this album, he worked with many Swiss producers. Odyssey stayed on the Swiss charts for 9 weeks and reached #19. Featured guests on this album includes Emel, Stress, Stephanie, and Berlin rapper Kool Savas. The single King Size became very popular, and after the release of this album, Bligg went on tour for a second time with DJ Cutmando and other musicians.

In 2005, Bligg released an album called Okey Dokey via the Musikvertrieb-Label. The album was the first Dualdisc that was ever released on the Swiss market. Emel and Kool Savas were included on this album. The single Gang Nöd is Bligg's contribution for Swiss suicide prevention campaign featured on television. In 2006, Bligg released the album Mit Liib & Seel. This was the first time that Bligg sang on one of his albums, as well as the first time that he used English lyrics. After the album's release, Bligg went on tour, accompanied by a seven-person band.

In 2007, Bligg released his fourth album, called Yves Spink. He worked on this album with DJ Cutmando, in their own well-furnished recording studio. The album reached the Top 10 Swiss charts. The album, which is named after a Swiss party organizer, features a song called Suzanne. This song is dedicated to Susanne Wille, the moderator of the Swiss news show 10vor10.

In October 2007, the song Volksmusigg was used for the TV show Die grössten Schweizer Hits. It was performed by the folk group Streichmusik Alder. This version was successful and was released as a single, then stayed on the Swiss charts for 20 weeks. Bligg went then on tour with Streichmusik Alder.

After successfully working with the group, Bligg decided to incorporate traditional folk elements into his songs, especially using the Hammered dulcimer in his beats. In October 2008, Bligg released his fifth album called 0816. After eight weeks, Bligg reached #1 on the Swiss charts and stayed there for weeks. The first single off the album was the song Rosalie, which was about a woman who falls in love with a florist. The song reached #5 on the Hitparade Single charts. From 8 January to 18 April 2009, Bligg went on tour. In order to reproduce the recorded album's style elements while touring, the band included accordion player Nicolas Senn, who played the Hammered dulcimer on-stage.

Between 2010 and 2020, Bligg released 6 further albums called Bart aber herzlich, Service publigg, Instinkt, KombiNation, Unplugged and Okey Dokey II. All six albums reached the Top 5 on the Official Swiss Charts.

== Bligg'n'Lexx discography ==
Year	Album	Peak positions
Year	Album	SWI
2000	Nahdisnah	—

with Lexx as Bligg'n'Lexx

Year	Single	Album
1999	"Schnitzeljagd"	Non-album single
2000	"Du & Ich"	Nahdisnah

== Bligg discography ==
=== Albums ===
Year	Album	Peak positions	Certifications
Year	Album	SWI	Certifications
2001	Normal	20	
2004	Odyssey	19	
2006	Mit Liib & Seel	12	
2007	Yves Spink	9	
2008	0816	1	IFPI SWI: 4× Platinum
2010	Bart aber herzlich	1	IFPI SWI: 4× Platinum
2013	Service Publigg	1	IFPI SWI: 2× Platinum
2015	Instinkt	3	IFPI SWI: Gold
2018	KombiNation	1	IFPI SWI: Platinum
2019	Unplugged	2	
2020	Okey Dokey II	1	
2023	Tradition	1	
2026	The Bligg Picture	1	

Other solo album releases

- 2009: 0816 Nackt (Deluxe edition of 0816)
- 2011: Brass aber herzlich (Deluxe edition of Bart aber herzlich)
- 2014: Service Publigg – Live im Volkshaus (Deluxe edition of Service Publigg)

=== EPs ===
- 2001: Relaxtra
- 2004: Odyssey Club

=== Mixtapes ===
Year	Album	Peak positions
Year	Album	SWI
2005	Okey Dokey	23

=== Singles ===
Year	Single	Peak positions	Album	Certifications
Year	Single	SWI	Album	Certifications
2001	"Alles scho mal ghört" (feat. Emel)	7	Normal	
2001	"Raw Dawgz" (feat. Tha Alkaholiks)	–	Normal	
2001	"Relaxtra" (feat. Lexx & Stress)	19	Normal	
2004	"Single"	18	Odyssey	
2004	"King Size" (feat. Kool Savas)	–	Odyssey	
2005	"Gang nöd"	–	Non-album single	
2007	"Susanne"	–	Yves Spink	
2007	"Börn Baby"	–	Yves Spink	
2007	"Volksmusigg" (with Streichmusik Alder)	7	Yves Spink	
2008	"Für's Läbe"	–	Non-album single	
2008	"Rosalie"	5	0816	IFPI SWI: 2× Platinum
2008	"Musigg i dä Schwiiz"	9	0816	IFPI SWI: Platinum
2009	"Signal"	23	0816	
2009	"Stahn Uf" (with Baschi, Stress, Ritschi & Seven)	1	Non-album single	
2010	"Legendä und Heldä"	1	Bart aber herzlich	IFPI SWI: Platinum
2010	"Chef"	15	Bart aber herzlich	IFPI SWI: Platinum
2011	"Manhattan"	9	Bart aber herzlich	IFPI SWI: Platinum
2011	"I'd Kill for You" (feat. Jessy Howe)	59	Bart aber herzlich	
2011	"Au poste" (with Stress, Kaspar E. Glättli III)	43		
2013	"MundART"	3	Service Publigg	IFPI SWI: Gold
2015	"Lah sie redä"	4	Instinkt	
2018	"Ja aber..."	14	KombiNation	IFPI SWI: Gold
2018	"In Tüüfels Chuchi" (feat. Zid)	73	KombiNation	
2018	"Im freiä Fall"	97	KombiNation	
2018	"Us Mänsch" (feat. Marc Sway)	16	KombiNation	
2020	"B.L.I. Doppel G"	27	TBA	IFPI SWI: Gold

Featured in

- 1999: Bruch e Waag (Gleiszwei featuring Bligg)
- 2001: De Schwierig (Gleiszwei featuring Bligg)
- 2002: S'tut Ma Laid (Spooman with Bligg, TZA)
- 2002: Olmapeople (Stress featuring Bligg)
- 2012: Irgendwenn (Slädu featuring Bligg)
- 2012: One At The Time (Stress featuring Bligg)
- 2020: Narbe (SMA Kids with Bligg)

Others

- 1995: Zürisläng Freischtiil (Vinyl) (with Lügner, Tiisär & DJ Cutmando)

== Awards and nominations ==
=== Results ===
Year	Award	Nomination	Work	Result	Ref.
2009	Swiss Music Awards	Best Album Urban National	0816	Won	
2009	Swiss Music Awards	Best Song National	Rosalie	Nominated	
2010	Swiss Music Awards	Best Song National	Stahn Uf (with Baschi, Ritschi, Seven & Stress)	Nominated	
2011	Swiss Music Awards	Best Hit National	Legändä & Heldä	Won	
2011	Swiss Music Awards	Best Album Urban National	Bart aber herzlich	Won	
2014	Swiss Music Awards	Best Hit National	Mundart	Won	
2014	Swiss Music Awards	Best Album Urban National	Service Publigg	Won	
2016	MTV Europe Music Awards	Best Swiss Act	Himself	Nominated	
2017	Swiss Music Awards	Best Male Solo Act	Himself	Nominated	
2017	Swiss Music Awards	Best Album	Instinkt	Nominated	
2019	Swiss Music Awards	Best Hit	Üs Mänsch (with Marc Sway)	Nominated	
2019	Swiss Music Awards	Best Male Solo Act	Himself	Won	
2019	Swiss Music Awards	Best Album	KombiNation	Won	
2019	Swiss Influencer Awards	Music	Himself	Won	
2020	MTV Europe Music Awards	Best Swiss Act	Himself	Nominated	
