= Sky Is the Limit =

Studio album by DJ Antoine
- Released: 25 January 2013
- Length: 2:12:47 (standard)
- Label: Kontor Records
- Producer: DJ Antoine & Mad Mark

DJ Antoine chronology
Welcome to DJ Antoine (2007)	Sky Is the Limit (2013)	Sky Is the Limit (The DJ Edition) (2013)

Singles from Sky Is the Limit
- 1. "Bella Vita" Released: 25 January 2013; 2. "Bella Vita (Remixes)" Released: 26 January 2013; 3. "All I Live For" Released: 15 March 2013; 4. "Sky Is the Limit" Released: 15 March 2013; 5. "Ma Chérie 2k13 (Ma Chérie)" Released: 15 March 2013; 6. "House Party" Released: 27 September 2013; 7. "Crazy World" Released: 27 December 2013

Sky Is the Limit is the seventh studio album published by the Swiss DJ and producer DJ Antoine, released on 25 January 2013. The first single released from the album is "Bella Vita". The second was All I Live For and the third Sky Is the Limit.

== Background ==
DJ Antoine announced the first time on 22 November 2012 on his official YouTube channel announced that he will release on 25 January 2013 a new album. Not at all songs the guest musicians or singers are given. The Swiss singer Maury, who sang hits like All We Need, In My Dreams or Broadway, acted on this CD with many tracks, both as a singer and as a songwriter and producer with Mad Mark and Antoine.

=== Description of the CDs ===
First CD (↓ Track listing) The first CD consists entirely of new songs. Various, often not mentioned musicians, work with here. All tracks from DJ Antoine were mixed by his studio partner and good friend Mad Mark. Cover songs are also available, for example "Power to the People" by fii.

Second CD (↓ Track listing) On CD number two are also contained many new songs, and here also the DJ duo Flame Makers participated alongside Mad Mark on many songs. As a special this CD includes a remix of the song "Ma Chérie", in which the American rapper Pitbull participates. You can also, the song "Beautiful Liar" in two variations, as a dance and as a rock version.

Third CD (↓ Title List) The third CD is only in the Limited Edition. It consists of a special DJ mix, which includes selected songs of this album, which merge into each other. But not the radio version are used, but the extended versions of the songs. In download stores such as Amazon or iTunes, it is available only as a 76-minute single-track.

== Release ==
Sky Is the Limit appeared almost worldwide. In each of the selected countries, it was published at various times on various record label. There have also different number of songs. In a country more and in another country less, for example, the Japanese version of Sky Is the Limit includes the song "Every Breath" from 2010. Also, various CD cover were selected.

=== Release dates ===
Country	Date	Title Number	Label
Germany	25 January 2013	36	Kontor Records
Italy	1 February 2013	36	X-Energy Records
Japan	15 May 2013	15	Global Productions
United States	14 May 2013	21	Global Productions

== Editions ==
There are different editions of the album available:

Edition	Includes
Digital Download	CD1, CD2 and Bonus
2CD Standard	CD1 and CD2
3CD Limited	CD1, CD2, CD3 in a box
Deluxebox	CD1, CD2, CD3 in a box with limited bracelet, poster and sticker

== Chart performance ==
Within just a few hours, the album was ranked number one in the German, Austrian and Swiss iTunes album chart. In Germany it rose in the first week til number No. 6 in the official album charts. In Austria, it jumped to number 2 and in Switzerland, the album reached number one on the album charts.

Although the song "House Party", "Sky Is the Limit" and "Perfect Day" did not appear as a single, it reached due to strong downloads in several music portals the singles charts in many countries. "Bella Vita" peaked on number one only one week after the album was released. In Germany "Sky Is the Limit" was the most successful song of the album.

== Track listing ==
CD1
No.	Title	Writer(s)	guest musicians	Length
1.	"Sky Is the Limit" (Album Version)		Vocals by Jenson Vaughan	4:38
2.	"Crazy World" (Radio Edit)	TBA	Vocals by Craig Smart	3:14
3.	"Perfect Day" (Radio Edit)	TBA	feat. B-Case & Shontelle; Vocals by DJ Antoine, Mad Mark, Maury	2:57
4.	"Hello Romance" (DJ Antoine vs Mad Mark 2k13 Radio Edit)	TBA	Vocals by Maury	2:55
5.	"Bella Vita" (DJ Antoine vs Mad Mark 2k13 Radio Edit)		Vocals by Jenson Vaughan & TomE	3:24
6.	"Children Of The Night [We Are]" (DJ Antoine vs Mad Mark 2k13 Radio Edit)		with Morandi	3:40
7.	"Meet Me In Paris" (Radio Edit)		Vocals by Craig Smart	3:21
8.	"Give It Up for Love" (Album Version)		with Nicola Fasano, Steve Forest feat. U-Jean	4:17
9.	"My Corazon" (Radio Edit)		Vocals by Craig Smart, Jenson Vaughan & Tideman	3:29
10.	"House Party" (Radio Edit)		feat. B-Case & U-Jean	3:27
11.	"To The People" (DJ Antoine vs Mad Mark 2k13 Radio Edit)		feat. fii	3:17
12.	"Keep On Dancing (With The Stars)" (Album Version)		feat. Jade Novah	4:16
13.	"Everlasting Love" (Album Version)		Vocals by Craig Smart	3:58
14.	"Now Or Never" (Radio Edit)		with Cristian Marchi	2:57
15.	"Something in The Air" (Radio Edit)		Vocals by Jenson Vaughan & TomE	3:19
16.	"We Will Never Grow Old" (Radio Edit)		Vocals by Anne Judith Wik	3:38
17.	"On Top of the World" (Radio Edit)		feat. B-Case, Nick McCord & Joey Moe	3:12
18.	"Welcome to My Home" (DJ Antoine vs Mad Mark 2k13 Radio Edit)		feat. The One	3:01
19.	"Already There" (Album Version)		Vocals by Craig Smart & Jenson Vaughan	4:45
20.	"You and Me" (Radio Edit)		feat. B-Case & U-Jean	3:04
Total length:				1:10:49

CD2
No.	Title	guest musicians	Length
1.	"Pop It Up [We Wanna Party]" (Album Version)	feat. Juiceppe	3:48
2.	"Festival Killer" (Album Version)	with FlameMakers	4:23
3.	"Beautiful Liar" (Album Version)	feat. Nick McCord	4:27
4.	"Paralyzed" (DJ Antoine vs Mad Mark 2k13 Album Edit)	with Syke'N'Sugarstarr feat. Destineak	3:55
5.	"Without You" (Album Version)	with FlameMakers feat. Ladina Spence	3:38
6.	"Love Song" (Album Version)	with FlameMakers	3:55
7.	"It's Like Insomnia" (Album Version)	with FlameMakers feat. Jojo B	3:44
8.	"Paradise" (Album Version)	feat. Kalenna of Dirty Money	4:34
9.	"Girls 4x" (FlameMakers Album Version)	Vocals by Craig Smart	4:08
10.	"Firelight" (Album Version)	with FlameMakers; Vocals by Grace Tither	3:53
11.	"All I Live For" (DJ Antoine vs Mad Mark 2k13 Radio Edit)	with FlameMakers; Vocals by Maury	3:53
12.	"These Boots" (Radio Edit)	Vocals by Alisha Pillay	3:27
13.	"Like A Hurricane" (Album Version)	with FlameMakers feat. Max Barskih; Vocals by Katrin	3:10
14.	"You're Ma Chérie" (DJ Antoine vs Mad Mark 2k13 Radio Edit)	feat. Pitbull; Vocals by Angel	3:12
15.	"Beautiful Liar" (Original Mix)	feat. Nick McCord	4:01
16.	"Es werde Nacht"	feat. Hellmut	3:50
Total length:			1:01:58

Digital download bonus
No.	Title	guest musicians	Length
17.	"Unbreakable" (Radio Edit)	DJ Antoine vs. Mad Mark feat. Karl Wolf	2:48
18.	"Bermuda Triangle" (DJ Antoine vs. Mad Mark)	feat. Axana	3:52
19.	"DJ Antoine Special DJ Mix" (Continuous Mix)		76:16
Total length:			1:22:56

CD3 (only in 3CD Limited Version)
No.	Title	guest musicians	Length
1.	"Sky Is the Limit" (Album Version)	Vocals by Jenson Vaughan	5:19
2.	"House Party" (Extended Mix)	feat. B-Case & U-Jean	3:26
3.	"Festival Killer" (Extended Mix)	with FlameMakers	5:25
4.	"Bella Vita" (DJ Antoine vs Mad Mark 2k13 Extended Mix)	Vocals by Jenson Vaughan & TomE	4:08
5.	"Pop It Up [We Wanna Party]" (Extended Mix)	feat. Juiceppe	5:03
6.	"Beautiful Liar" (Extended Mix)	feat. Nick McCord	4:30
7.	"Without You" (Extended Mix)	with FlameMakers feat. Ladina Spence	3:46
8.	"Children Of The Night [We Are]" (DJ Antoine vs Mad Mark 2k13 Extended Mix)	with Morandi	5:40
9.	"Perfect Day" (Extended Mix)	feat. B-Case & Shontelle; Vocals by DJ Antoine, Mad Mark, Maury	3:38
10.	"My Corazon" (Extended Mix)	Vocals by Jenson Vaughan	4:01
11.	"It's Like Insomnia" (Extended Mix)	with FlameMakers feat. Jojo B	4:03
12.	"Something in The Air" (Extended Mix)	Vocals by Jenson Vaughan & TomE	4:22
13.	"Hello Romance" (DJ Antoine vs Mad Mark 2k13 Extended Mix)	Vocals by Maury	3:07
14.	"Meet Me In Paris" (Extended Mix)	Vocals by Craig Smart	3:31
15.	"Give It Up for Love" (Extended Mix)	with Nicola Fasano, Steve Forest feat. U-Jean	4:46
16.	"Firelight" (Extended Mix)	with FlameMakers; Vocals by Grace Tither	4:22
17.	"Paralyzed" (DJ Antoine vs Mad Mark 2k13 Extended Vocal Mix)	with Syke'N'Sugarstarr feat. Destineak	3:41
18.	"Love Song" (Extended Mix)	with FlameMakers	5:11
Total length:			1:21:49

== Charts ==
=== Weekly charts ===
Chart (2013)	Peak position
Austrian Albums (Ö3 Austria)	2
German Albums (Offizielle Top 100)	6
Swiss Albums (Schweizer Hitparade)	1

=== Year-end charts ===
Chart (2013)	Position
Austrian Albums (Ö3 Austria)	25
German Albums (Offizielle Top 100)	86
Swiss Albums (Schweizer Hitparade)	3

== Certifications ==
Region	Certification	Certified units/sales
Germany (BVMI)	Gold	100,000^{‡}
Switzerland (IFPI Switzerland)	Platinum	20,000^{^}
^{^} Shipments figures based on certification alone.^{‡} Sales+streaming figures based on certification alone.
