= Bella Vita =

Single by DJ Antoine

from the album Sky Is the Limit
- Released: 25 January 2013
- Genre: Electro house
- Length: 3:23
- Songwriters: Fabio Antoniali; Antoine Konrad; Craig Smart; Jens Kindervater; Jenson Vaughan; Frank Bülles; Tom Corea

DJ Antoine singles chronology
"Broadway" (2012)	"Bella Vita" (2013)	"Sky Is the Limit" (2013)

"Bella Vita" is a song by Swiss DJ and producer DJ Antoine, taken from his studio album Sky Is the Limit. "Bella vita" means beautiful life in Italian. The song reached number one in Switzerland.

== Track listings ==
CD single
No.	Title	Length
1.	"Bella Vita" (DJ Antoine vs Mad Mark 2k13 Radio Edit)	3:23
2.	"Bella Vita" (DJ Antoine vs Mad Mark 2k13 Extended Mix)	5:22

== Charts and certifications ==
=== Peak positions ===
Chart (2013)	Peak position
Austria (Ö3 Austria Top 40)	5
Belgium (Ultratip Bubbling Under Wallonia)	16
Czech Republic Airplay (ČNS IFPI)	29
France (SNEP)	57
Germany (GfK)	15
Hungary (Editors' Choice Top 40)	28
Netherlands (Single Top 100)	91
Italy (FIMI)	29
Poland Dance (ZPAV)	3
Slovakia Airplay (ČNS IFPI)	1
Switzerland (Schweizer Hitparade)	1

=== Year-end charts ===
Chart (2013)	Position
Germany (Media Control AG)	74
Switzerland (Schweizer Hitparade)	21

== Certifications ==
Region	Certification	Certified units/sales
Germany (BVMI)	Gold	150,000^{^}
Italy (FIMI)	Gold	15,000^{*}
Switzerland (IFPI Switzerland)	Platinum	30,000^{^}
^{*} Sales figures based on certification alone.^{^} Shipments figures based on certification alone.
