= Züri West =

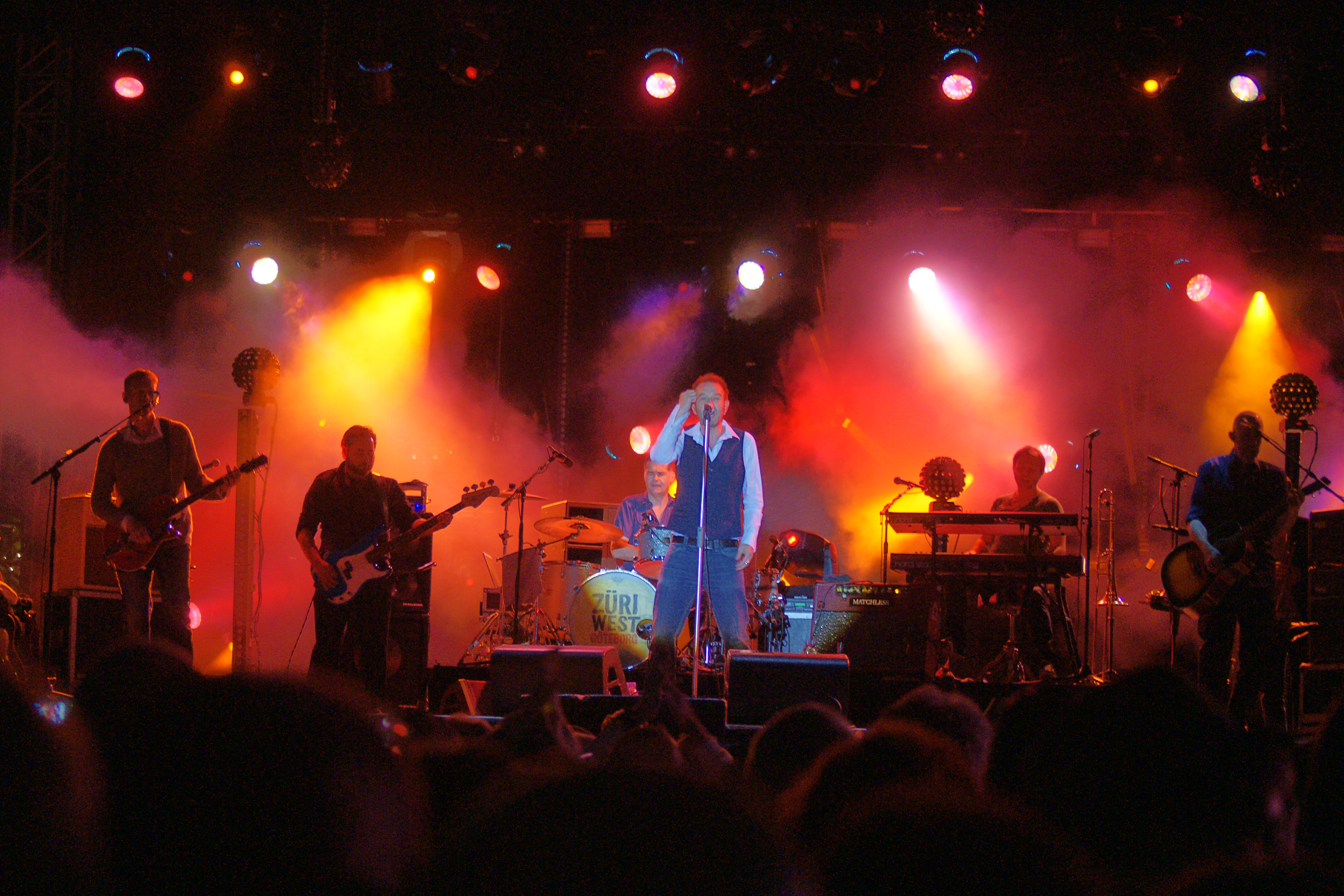
- Züri West at the «Stars of Sounds» concert in Aarberg, 1 June 2012.

Background information
- Origin: Switzerland
- Genre: Rock
- Years active: 1984–present
- Members: Kuno Lauener; Markus Fehlmann; Gert Stäuble; Manuel Häfliger; Wolfgang Zwieauer
- Past members: Peter Schmid (until 1986); Sam Mumenthaler (until 1986); Martin S. Silfverberg (until 1992); Peter von Siebenthal (until 2000); Martin Gerber (until 2000); Oliver Kuster (until 2004); Jürg Schmidhauser (until 2012); Tom Etter (until 2017)
- Website: www.zueriwest.ch

Züri West (Swiss German for Zürich West) is a Swiss rock band. Most of their songs are written in Bernese German.

The band's name is an ironic reference to Bern, the capital of Switzerland, as merely a place west of Zürich, the largest city in Switzerland.

They released their debut studio album, Sport und Musik in 1987.

== Line-up ==
=== Current members ===
- Kuno Lauener (vocals): since 1984
- Markus Fehlmann (guitar): since 1984
- Gert Stäuble (drums): since 1993
- Manuel Häfliger (guitar): since 2017
- Wolfgang Zwieauer (bass): since 2017

=== Former members ===
- Peter Schmid (bass): 1984-1986
- Sam Mumenthaler (drums): 1984-1986
- Martin S. Silfverberg (drums): 1986–1992
- Peter von Siebenthal (guitar): 1984-2000
- Martin Gerber (bass): 1986–2000
- Oli Kuster (keyboards): 2000-2004
- Jürg Schmidhauser (bass): 2000-2012
- Tom Etter (guitar): 2000-2017

== Discography ==
- Splendid EP (13 December 1985) - Black Cat at Bebop
- Kirchberg EP (November, 1986) - Black Cat at Sound Service
- Sport und Musik (15 November 1987) - Black Cat at Sound Service
- Bümpliz - Casablanca (13 May 1989) - Black Cat at Sound Service
- Elvis (15 June 1990) - Black Cat at Sound Service
- Arturo Bandini (15 November 1991) - Sound Service
- Wintertour (21 November 1992) - Weltrekords at Sound Service
- Züri West (10 May 1994) - Weltrekords at Sound Service
- Hoover Jam (11 May 1996) - Weltrekords at Sound Service
- Super 8 (6 March 1999) - Weltrekords at Sound Service
- Radio zum Glück (25 August 2001) - Weltrekords at Sound Service
- Retour - Best of (15 November 2003) - Weltrekords at Sound Service
- Aloha from Züri West (12 June 2004) - Weltrekords at Sound Service
- Haubi Songs (12 January 2008) - Weltrekords at Sound Service
- HomeRekords (23 April 2010) - Weltrekords at Sound Service
- Göteborg (23 March 2012) - Sound Service
- Love (24 March 2017) - Sound Service
- Loch dür Zyt (8 December 2023) - Sound Service

== Videography ==
- Am Blues vorus (28 March 2003)
