= Patent Ochsner =

Swiss rock band

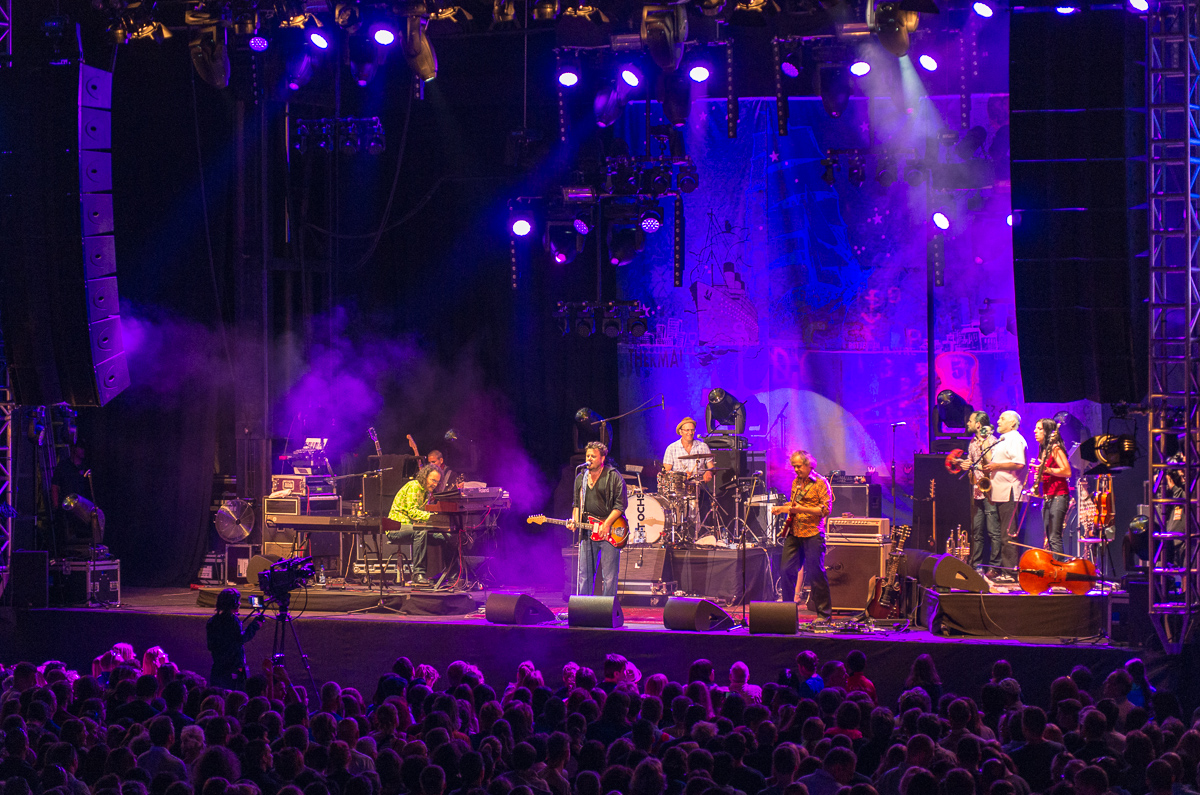
- Patent Ochsner at Stars of Sounds 2013

Background information
- Origin: Bern, Switzerland
- Genres: Mundart (Bernese German)
- Years active: 1990–present
- Members: Büne Huber; Monic Mathys; Andi Hug; Christian Brantschen; Menk Grossniklaus; Disu Gmünder; Daniel Woodtli; Katrin Bögli; Daniela Bertschinger
- Past members: Philippe Stalder (until 1995); Martin Neuhaus (until 1995); Carlo Brenni (until 1998); Böbu Ehrenzeller (until 2001); Resli Burri (until 2001); Tinu Frutiger (until 2001); Pascal „pazz“ Steiner (until 2006)
- Website: patentochsner.ch

Patent Ochsner is one of Switzerland's best-known rock bands, all of whose studio albums but one have topped the Swiss charts. Hailing from Bern, they perform songs in Swiss German.

== Current line-up (2006) ==
- Hanspeter Huber (vocals)
- Monic Mathys (bass guitar)
- Andi Hug (drums)
- Christian Brantschen (keyboard, accordion)
- Menk Grossniklaus (saxophone)
- Disu Gmünder (guitar)
- Pascal Steiner (keys and wind sven Jauch)
- Daniel Woodtli (trumpet)

== History ==
Patent Ochsner was formed in Bern in 1990 by singer Büne Huber and four other musicians. The lineup would change several times during the years. The band got their name from a ubiquitous type of Swiss dustbin and trash containers, manufactured by J. Ochsner AG and stamped with "Patent Ochsner".

In 1991, they released their debut "Schlachtplatte" (butcher plate; a traditional dish containing different types of meat and sausages). As the song "Bälpmoos" (about Belpmoos, Bern's regional airport) got huge radio airplay on Swiss radio stations they became quite famous in Switzerland. The ballad "Scharlachrot" (Scarlet) would increase their popularity.

In 1993 they released their second LP "Fischer" (fisherman), their first number one album. The year after "Gmües" (Vegetables) came out, completing their "food trilogy" together with Schlachtplatte and Fischer. "Gmües" contained the single hit "Jänner" (January).

In 1995 Patent Ochsner released the Song "Jacques" as their contribution to the campaign against French nuclear tests at Mururoa. The next year they released the hit single "W. Nuss vo Bümpliz" (a pun on Venus), followed by the album "Stella Nera" in 1997. After the live album "Wildbolz & Süsstrunk" released the year after, they had a break of a few years. Büne Huber released a solo album during this time.

Patent Ochsner had their comeback with 2 hit singles "Brandstifter" (arsonist) and "Trybguet" (flotsam), this song giving the name for their next album, released in 2003. In 2005 they released another album "Liebi, Tod & Tüüfu" (love, death & devil).

== Discography ==
=== Studio albums ===
- Schlachtplatte - (1991) - Zytglogge Verlag
- Fischer - (February, 1993) - COD Records
- Gmües - (August 29, 1994) - BMG Ariola (Switzerland)
- Stella Nera - (January 27, 1997) - BMG Ariola (Switzerland)
- Trybguet - (May 5, 2003) - BMG Ariola (Switzerland)
- Liebi, Tod + Tüüfu - (September 26, 2005) - Muve Records
- The Rimini Flashdown - (August 29, 2008) - Universal
- Johnny - The Rimini Flashdown Part II - (July 26, 2012) - Universal
- Finitolavoro - The Rimini Flashdown Part III - (2015) – Universal
- Cut Up (May 26, 2019) – Universal
- Tag & Nacht (January 31, 2025) – Universal

=== Live albums ===
- Wildbolz & Süsstrunk - (September 21, 1998) - BMG Ariola (Switzerland)
- Bundesplatz (CD + DVD) - (November 5, 2010) - Universal
- Gurten 2015 Live (November 6, 2015) - Universal
- Strange Fruits – Unique Moments – Live im Landesmuseum (November 3, 2017) - Universal

=== Radio singles ===
- Vohinger + Vovor (2005)
- Grüens Liecht (2005)

== Books ==
- Büne Huber, Martin Albisetti: Patent Ochsner Songbook. Stellanera, Bern 2004 ISBN 3-033-00254-4
