= Ma Chérie =

2011 single by DJ Antoine featuring The Beat Shakers

Single by DJ Antoine featuring The Beat Shakers

from the album Welcome to DJ Antoine
- Released: October 28, 2011
- Genre: Electro house
- Length: 3:48
- Songwriters: Maurizio Pozzi, Fabio Antoniali, Antoine Konrad, Boris Krstajic, D. Krstajic

DJ Antoine singles chronology
"Sunlight" (2011)	"Ma Chérie" (2011)	"I'm on You" (2012)

"Ma Chérie" is a song by Swiss DJ and producer DJ Antoine taken from his studio album Welcome to DJ Antoine. It features Serbian DJ-duo, The Beatshakers and features the vocals of Swiss singer-songwriter Maurizio Pozzi. The song became a top-ten hit in Austria, Belgium, Czech Republic, France, Germany, Hungary, Italy, Russia, Slovakia, Poland and Switzerland. The original Ma Cherie song was created in the 2007 by The Beatshakers with the voice of the singer Alberto, the lyrics by Danica Krstajić and the music by Boris Krstajić.

A remix of the song with Pitbull and Mad Mark was released in 2013, gaining over 20 million streams on Spotify as of 2020. In addition, another remix with both Pitbull and Enrique Iglesias was recorded, but never released.

== Track listings ==
CD single
No.	Title	Length
1.	"Ma Chérie" (DJ Antoine Vs Mad Mark 2k12 Radio Edit)	3:12
2.	"Ma Chérie" (Remady Radio Edit)	3:27

== Charts and certifications ==
=== Weekly charts ===
Original version

Chart (2010–2012)	Peak position
Austria (Ö3 Austria Top 40)	2
Belgium (Ultratip Bubbling Under Flanders)	35
Belgium (Ultratop 50 Wallonia)	20
Czech Republic Airplay (ČNS IFPI)	1
Europe (Euro Digital Songs)	5
France (SNEP)	73
Germany (GfK)	6
Hungary (Dance Top 40)	6
Hungary (Rádiós Top 40)	8
Italy (FIMI)	4
Luxembourg Digital Songs (Billboard)	2
Poland Dance (ZPAV)	7
Russia Airplay (TopHit); Houseshaker Radio Edit 2k12	13
Slovakia Airplay (ČNS IFPI)	1
Switzerland (Schweizer Hitparade)	2
Ukraine Airplay (TopHit); DJ Antoine vs Mad Mark Original Mix	47

Ma Chérie 2k12 version

Chart (2011)	Peak position
France (SNEP)	7

=== Year-end charts ===
Chart (2010)	Position
Switzerland (Schweizer Hitparade)	69

Chart (2012)	Position
Austria (Ö3 Austria Top 40)	3
Belgium (Ultratop Wallonia)	81
Germany (Official German Charts)	14
Hungary (Dance Top 40)	15
Hungary (Rádiós Top 40)	62
Russia Airplay (TopHit)	33
Poland (ZPAV)	13
Switzerland (Schweizer Hitparade)	3

2013 year-end chart performance for "Ma Chérie"
Chart (2013)	Position
Russia Airplay (TopHit)	191
Ukraine Airplay (TopHit)	174

=== Certifications ===
Region	Certification	Certified units/sales
Germany (BVMI)	5× Gold	750,000^{‡}
Italy (FIMI)	3× Platinum	90,000^{*}
Switzerland (IFPI Switzerland)	4× Platinum	120,000^{^}
Streaming
Denmark (IFPI Danmark)	Gold	900,000^{†}
^{*} Sales figures based on certification alone.^{^} Shipments figures based on certification alone.^{‡} Sales+streaming figures based on certification alone.^{†} Streaming-only figures based on certification alone.
