= Up in the Sky (album) =

Studio album by 77 Bombay Street
- Released: 11 February 2011
- Recorded: 2009–2011
- Genre: Folk rock
- Length: 46:15
- Label: Gadget Records

77 Bombay Street chronology
Dead Bird (2009)	Up in the Sky (2011)	Oko Town (2012)

Singles from Up in the Sky
- 1. "47 Millionaires" Released: 2010; 2. "Long Way" Released: 2011; 3. "Up in the Sky" Released: 2011; 4. "I Love Lady Gaga" Released: 2011

Up in the Sky is the second album of the Swiss folk rock band 77 Bombay Street. It was released in 2011 on Gadget Records as their first label release. The band had released its debut album Dead Bird independently self-financed and released in 2009.

Up in the Sky with all songs written by the four brothers and produced by Thomas Fessler reached number 3 on the Schweizer Hitparade, the official Swiss Albums chart. It resulted in four singles "47 Millionaires", "Long Way", the title track "Up in the Sky" (that made it to number 7 of the Swiss Singles Chart" and "I Love Lady Gaga".

Lead vocals on most tracks were performed by Matt Buchli. But lead vocals on the track "Miss You Girl" was by Joe Buchli and Simri-Ramon Buchli was the main performer on "I Love Lady Gaga". The album spent 115 weeks in the Swiss charts and went platinum.

== Track listing ==
No.	Title	Writer(s)	Lead vocals	Length
1.	"47 Millionnaires"	77 Bombay Street; Thomas Fessler	Matt Buchli	3:36
2.	"Up in the Sky"	77 Bombay Street; Thomas Fessler	Matt Buchli	3:48
3.	"Forgotten Your Name"	77 Bombay Street; Thomas Fessler	Matt Buchli	3:33
4.	"Long Way"	77 Bombay Street; Thomas Fessler	Matt Buchli	3:32
5.	"Miss You Girl"	77 Bombay Street; Thomas Fessler	Joe Buchli	3:53
6.	"It's Now"	77 Bombay Street; Thomas Fessler	Matt Buchli	4:21
7.	"I Love Lady Gaga"	77 Bombay Street; Thomas Fessler	Simri-Ramon Buchli	3:26
8.	"In the War"	77 Bombay Street; Thomas Fessler	Matt Buchli	3:54
9.	"Hero"	77 Bombay Street; Thomas Fessler	Matt Buchli	3:58
10.	"Waiting for Tomorrow"	77 Bombay Street; Thomas Fessler	Matt Buchli	4:20
11.	"Number 2"	77 Bombay Street; Thomas Fessler	Matt Buchli	3:04
12.	"Get Away"	77 Bombay Street; Thomas Fessler	Matt Buchli	3:20
Total length:				46:15

== Charts ==
=== Weekly charts ===
Chart (2011–13)	Peak position
Swiss Albums (Schweizer Hitparade)	3

=== Year-end charts ===
Chart (2011)	Position
Swiss Albums (Schweizer Hitparade)	9
Chart (2012)	Position
Swiss Albums (Schweizer Hitparade)	18
