= Bastian Baker =

Swiss musician

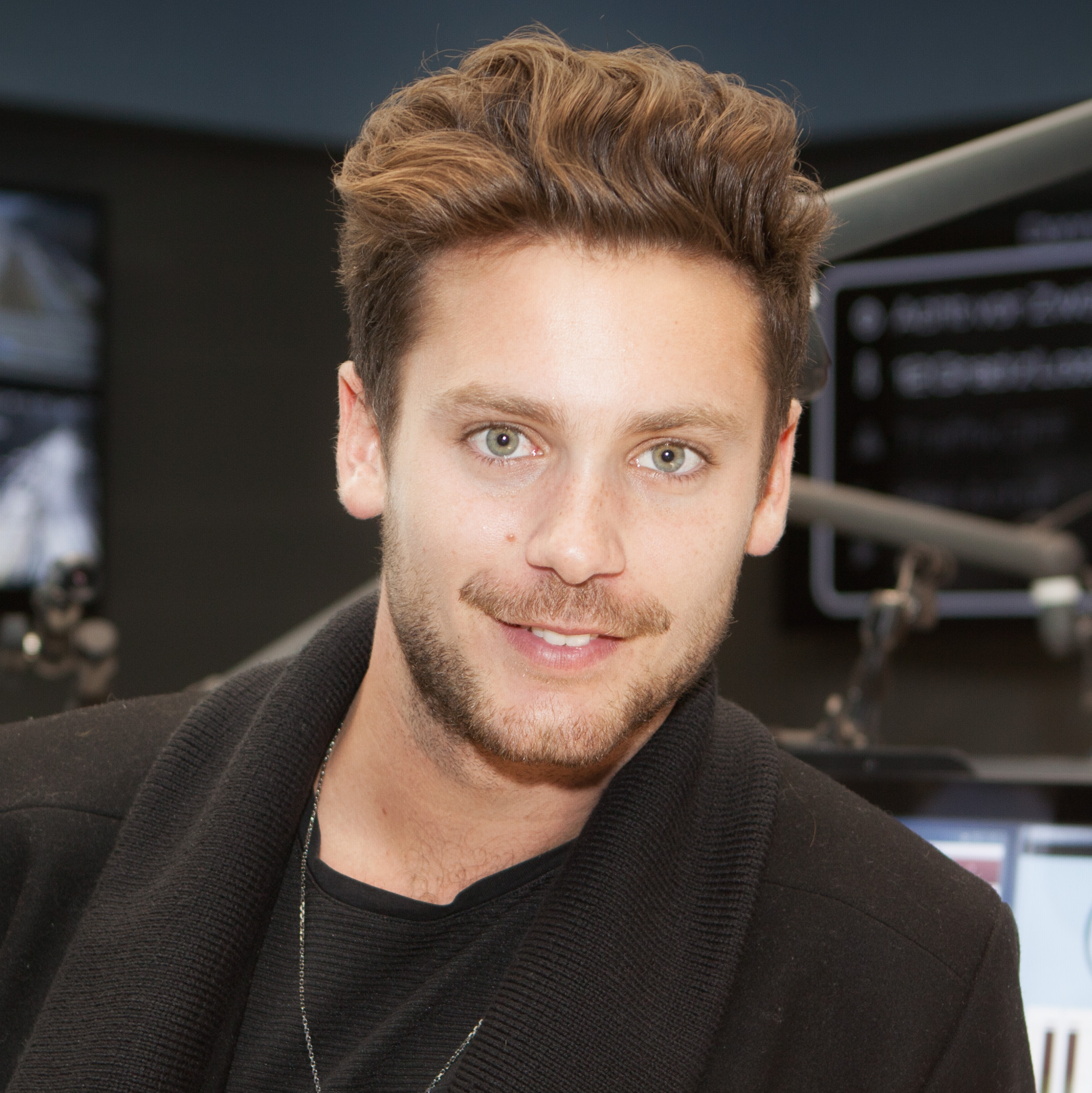
- Baker in 2017

Background information
- Born: 20 May 1991 (age 35); Lausanne, Switzerland
- Genres: Pop, country
- Occupations: Singer-songwriter, musician
- Instruments: Vocals, guitar
- Years active: 2011–present
- Label: Belleville Music
- Website: bastianbaker.com

Bastien Kaltenbacher (born 20 May 1991), better known as Bastian Baker, is a Swiss singer-songwriter.

== Career ==
Born in Lausanne to a professional hockey player father, Bastian wanted to become a professional hockey player in the footsteps of his father and played on Swiss National League's Juniors Elite A side "Lausanne 4 Clubs" under the name Bastien Kaltenbacher. But interested in music as well, he joined the school choir in Villeneuve, and was given solo roles. A father of a friend saw him in a performance in 2010 during a social gathering and offered to produce his songs. His first single "Lucky" produced by Richard Meyer (a.k.a. Swayd) was launched in March 2011 and charted in the Swiss Singles Chart. He took part in Caprices Festival in April 2011 and at Montreux Jazz Festival on 16 July 2011 releasing his debut album, Tomorrow May Not Be Better, on 9 September 2011. The album reached No. 3 in the Swiss album charts and topped the Romandie Charts and earned him in 2012, the "Best Breaking Act" award during Prix Walo, the official Swiss Music Awards in French language. After that success, he was invited to perform in French television's Taratata. His album Tomorrow May Not Be Better was released in France on 27 April 2012 and his single "Lucky" gained success in France as well.

From 13 October to 10 November 2012, he took part in season 3 of Danse avec les stars partnering with Katrina Patchett finishing 7th out of 10 participating stars.

Baker was the opening act for all dates of Shania Twain's 2018 Now Tour and performed "Party for Two" with her during her set.

On 20 August 2020, Baker was officially signed to a one-year contract by third-tier ice hockey team HCV Martigny of the MySports League and was introduced to the media at a press conference that same day.

== Personal life ==
Baker was born to hockey player Bruno Kaltenbacher and school teacher Magali, and has two sisters, Margaux and Marine. Marine is also pursuing a music career as MARYNE.

== Discography ==
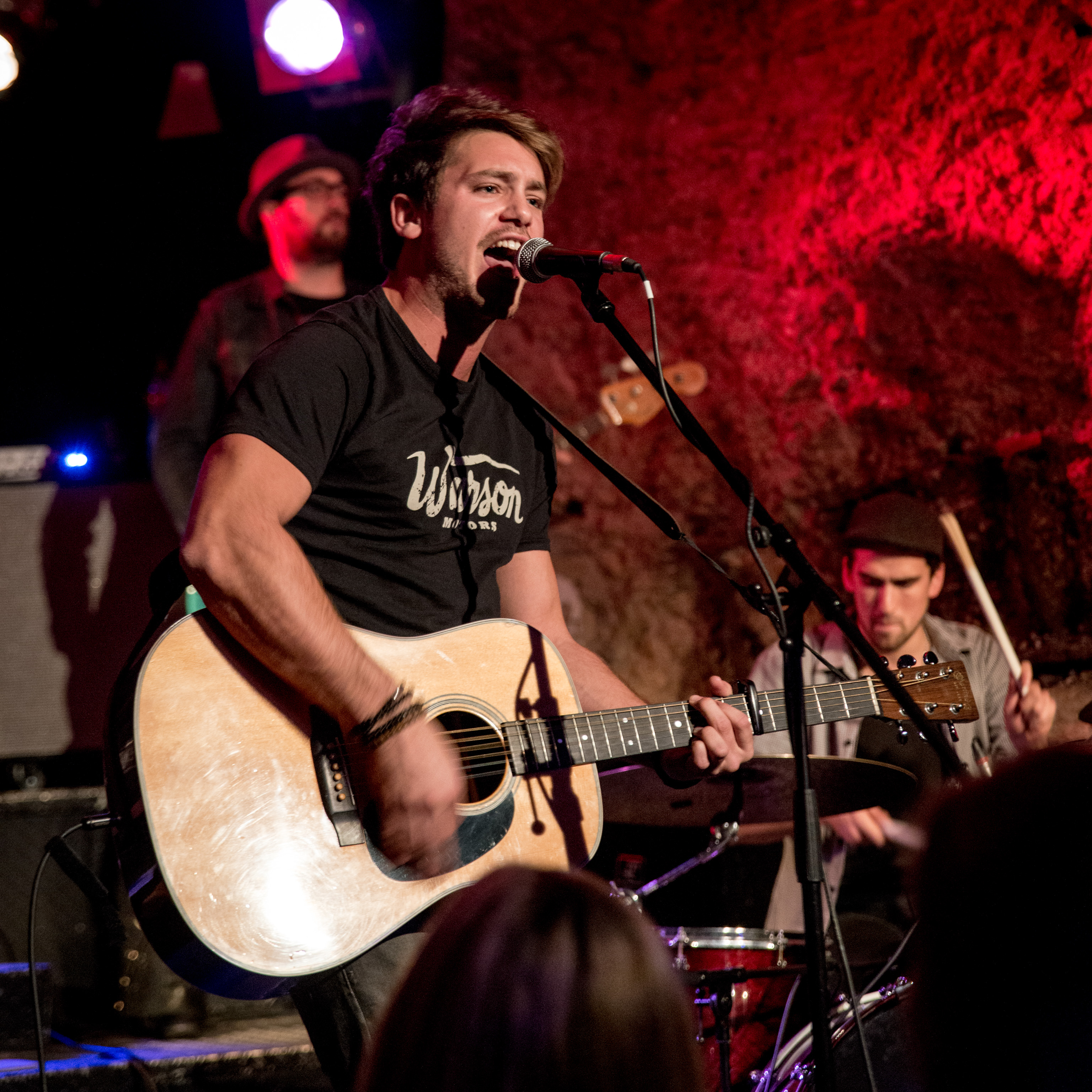
Baker performing in 2014

=== Albums ===
Album	Details	Charts			Certification
Album	Details	SWI	BEL (Wa)	FRA	Certification
Tomorrow May Not Be Better	Released: 9 September 2011 (SWI); Re-released: 27 April 2012 (SWI, FRA); Label: Phonag	3	79	59	SWI: Platinum
Noël's Room (with Stress & Noah Veraguth)	Released: 9 December 2012; Label: Phonag	1	—	—	
Too Old to Die Young	Released: 27 September 2013; Re-released: 24 October 2014; Label: Phonag	1	10	158	
Facing Canyons	Released: 6 November 2015; Label: Phonag	2	86	—	
Bastian Baker	Released: 26 October 2018; Label: Phonag	2	—	—	
Stories of the XXI	Released: 14 January 2022; Label: Phonag	1	—	—	

=== Singles ===
Year	Single	Charts			Certification	Album
Year	Single	SWI	BEL (Wa)	FRA	Certification	Album
2011	"I'd Sing for You"	9	11	—	SWI: Platinum	Tomorrow May Not Be Better
2011	"Lucky"^{[A]}	27	76	—		Tomorrow May Not Be Better
2011	"Tomorrow May Not Be Better"	65	—	—		Tomorrow May Not Be Better
2012	"Hallelujah"^{[B]}	24	55	18		Non-album release
2012	"All My Life" (with Stress & Noah Veraguth)	35	—	—		Noël's Room
2012	"Back in My Life" (with Stress)	34	—	—		Noël's Room
2013	"79 Clinton Street"	14	—	—		Too Old to Die Young
2014	"Follow the Wind"	20	—	—		Too Old to Die Young
2014	"Dirty Thirty"	73	—	—		Too Old to Die Young
2014	"Leaving Tomorrow"	33	—	—		Too Old to Die Young (Upgraded Edition)
2015	"Everything We Do"	21	—	—		Facing Canyons
2015	"Tattoo on My Brain"	23	—	—		Facing Canyons
2017	"Five Fingers"	48	—	—		
2018	"All Around Us"	51	—	—		Bastian Baker
2018	"Stay"	42	—	—		Bastian Baker
2020	"Here We Go" (with Yves Larock)	50	—	—		TBA
"—" denotes singles that did not chart or were not released.

== Notes ==
- A "Lucky" did not enter the Ultratop 50, but peaked at number 26 on the Wallonia Ultratip chart, which acts as a 50-song extension to the Ultratop 50.
- B "Hallelujah" did not enter the Ultratop 50, but peaked at number 5 on the Wallonia Ultratip chart, which acts as a 50-song extension to the Ultratop 50.
