= Seven (Swiss singer) =

Swiss musician (born 1978)

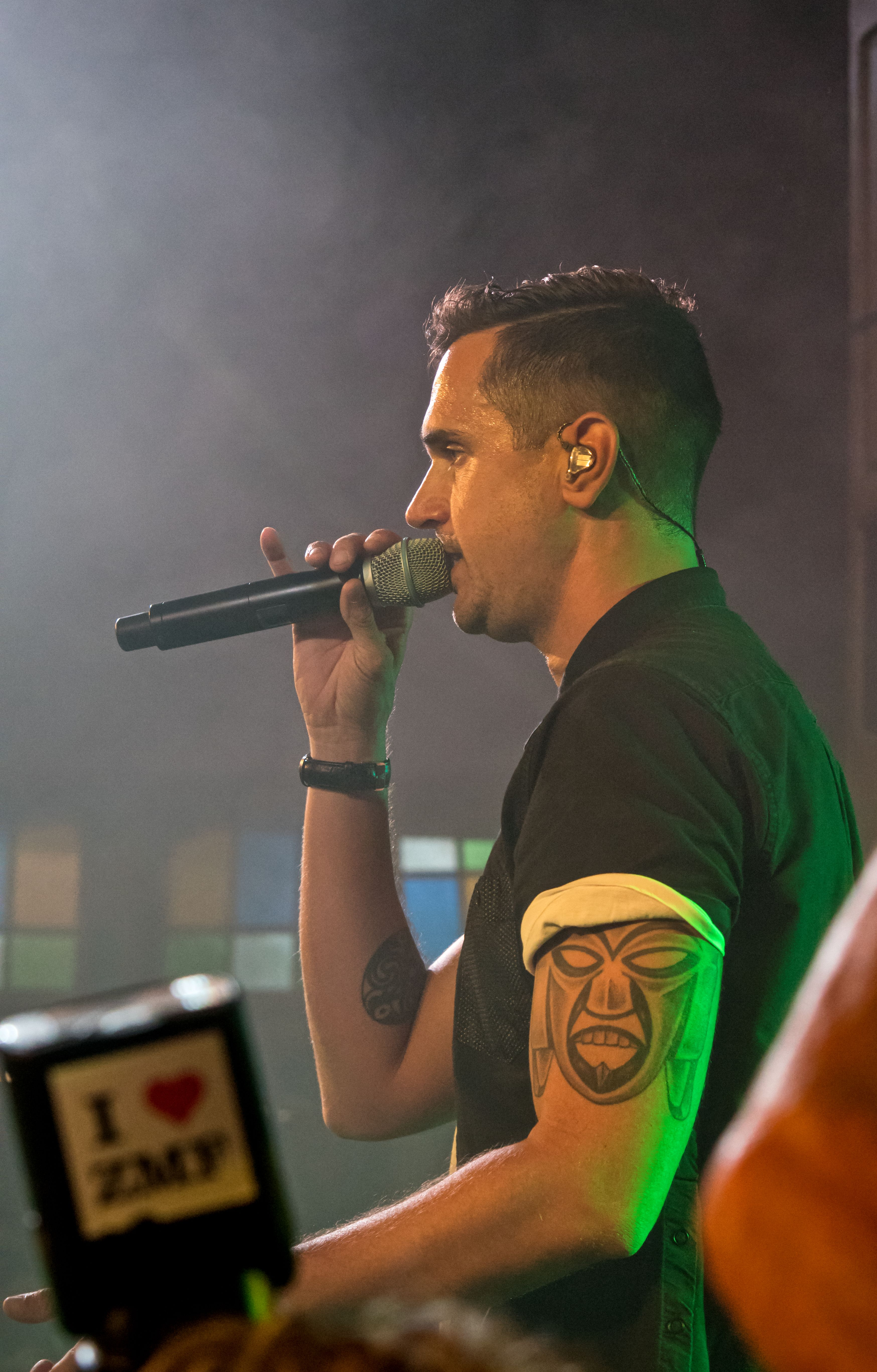
- Seven performing in 2016

Background information
- Birth name: Jan Dettwyler
- Born: 19 October 1978 (age 46); Wohlen, Switzerland
- Genres: R&B; soul; pop
- Occupation: Musician
- Instrument: Vocals
- Years active: 2000–present
- Labels: Sevenmusic Records
- Website: sevenmusic.ch/en

Jan Dettwyler (born 19 October 1978), professionally known as Seven, is a Swiss R&B, soul, and pop singer and musician.

== Discography ==
=== Studio albums ===
- Dedicated To... (2002)
- Sevensoul (2004)
- Lovejam (2005)
- Home (2007)
- Like a Rocket (2009)
- The Art Is King (2012)
- The Art Is Piano (2013)
- BackFunkLoveSoul (2015)
- 4Colors (2017)
- Ich Bin Mir Sicher! (2022)

=== EPs ===
- Brandneu (2020)

=== Live albums ===
- Seven Live – 2004 (2004)
- Seven Live @Cargo Club London (2005)
- Like a Rocket Live (2010)
- 7/7 Live Experience (2019)

== Compilations ==
- Unplugged (2010)
- Focused (2011)
- Best of 2002–2016 (2016)

=== Singles ===
- "Please" (2002)
- "Anymore" (2002)
- "Synthetic Soul" (2004)
- "Make U Happy" (2004)
- "Sign" (2005)
- "Mother" (2005)
- "Golden Stairs" (2007)
- "Wake Up" (2007)
- "On & On" (2007)
- "Lisa" (2009)
- "Go Slow" (2009)
- "Attitude" (2018)
- "Aber Wohi?" (2019)
- "Seele" (2020)
- "Immer Noch" (2020)
- "Dafür Musst Du Was Tun" (2020)
- "Junge (feat. Moses Pelham)" (2020)
- "Immer nur um Mich (feat. Flo Mega)" (2020)
- "Raus (feat. Curse)" (2020)
- "City of Gold – Live aus Frankfurt (feat. Laith Al-Deen)" (2020)
- "Unser kleines Wunder" (2021)
- "Lasst Uns Anders Sein" (2021)
- "Zu Zweit (feat. Cassandra Steen)" (2021)
- "Danke Dafür (feat. Credibil)" (2021)
- "Asche Im Wind" (2022)
