= DJ Antoine =

Swiss house DJ and record producer

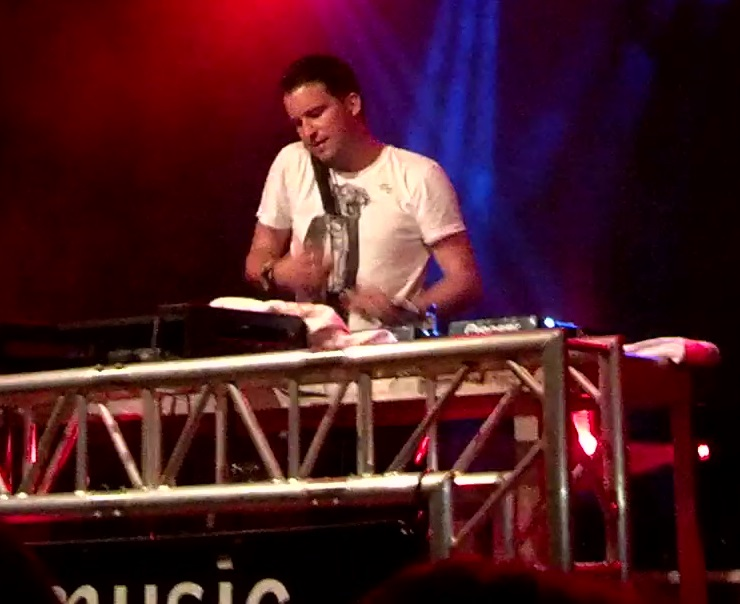
- DJ Antoine in 2013

Background information
- Born: Antoine Konrad; Sissach, Basel-Landschaft, Switzerland
- Genres: Electro, house, progressive house, electro house, hip house
- Occupations: DJ, record producer
- Years active: 1998–present
- Website: djantoine.com

Antoine Konrad, known professionally as DJ Antoine, is a Swiss house DJ and record producer from Basel.

== Musical career ==
=== Beginnings ===
DJ Antoine was born in Sissach, Basel-Landschaft.

In 1995, he opened a club, House Café, in Basel. He initially focused on Rap before switching genres to dance/electronic.

In 1998, he released his first album, DJ Antoine – The Pumpin' House Mix. In 2001, he won his first gold award for his album Houseworks 1. He has released over 50 albums.

Since 2003, he has been hosting a weekly radio show that is broadcast worldwide.

=== International career ===
In 2008, he released DJ Antoine –Stop!. The album's theme focuses on juvenile violence. For this album, he won a Swiss Music Award for Best National Dance Album in 2009. In 2010, his album DJ Antoine – 2010 was certified platinum. It was nominated for a Swiss Music Award in the category Best National Dance Album. In 2012, he won a Prix Walo in the 'DJ/Dance' category.

In 2011, he collaborated with Russian rapper Timati and American singer Kalenna on the hit single Welcome to St. Tropez, which was released in Germany and Austria by the German dance label Kontor Records. It became a top-5-hit in the German-speaking scene. His 2012 single Ma Chérie sold over 1 million units and earned several gold and platinum awards, and an MTV European Music Award for Best Swiss Act in 2012. Both singles and another collaboration with P. Diddy, Timati, and Dirty Money called I'm On You were included on his 2011 gold-certified album Welcome To DJ Antoine.

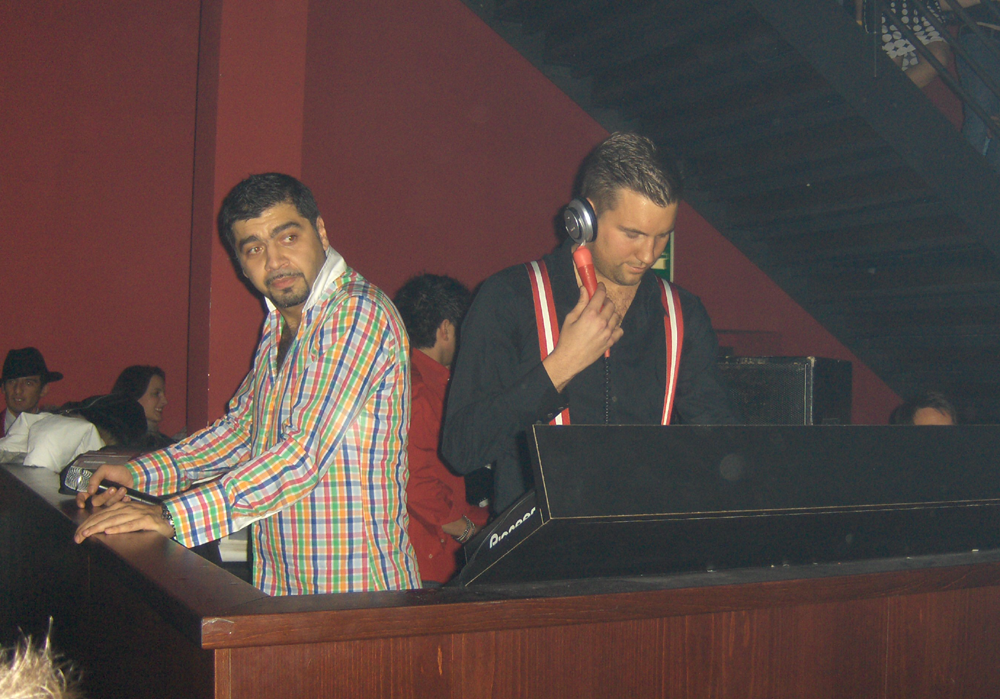
DJ Antoine (right) with MC Roby Rob in 2007

Antoine and his studio partner Mad Mark produced four more albums which charted in Switzerland and other European countries. His 2013 album Sky Is the Limit reached the top of Switzerland's album charts and the top 10 in Germany. It was certified platinum in Switzerland and gold in Germany. Holiday, a 2015 collaboration with American singer Akon, was featured on his 2016 album Provocateur, charting in Switzerland, Germany, Austria, France, and Belgium.

Antoine manages his own production and booking companies Global Productions GmbH and Global Bookings. He founded his own lifestyle company Konrad Lifestyle AG in 2016. His team consists of ten employees, based in Switzerland.

He has sold over 8,000,000 units of singles and albums and also runs his label Houseworks.

== Discography ==
Studio albums

- Stop! (2008)
- 2008 (2008)
- A Weekend at Hotel Campari (2008)
- 2009 (2009)
- Superhero? (2009)
- 17900 (2009)
- 2010 (2010)
- WOW (2010)
- 2011 (2011)
- Welcome to DJ Antoine (2011)
- Sky Is the Limit (2013)
- We Are the Party (2014)
- Provocateur (2016)
- The Time Is Now (2018)

Awards and achievements
Preceded by Gimma	Winner of MTV EMA for Best Swiss Act; 2012	Succeeded by
