= Rock am Ring and Rock im Park =

Pair of annual music festivals in Germany

Rock am Ring Rock im Park
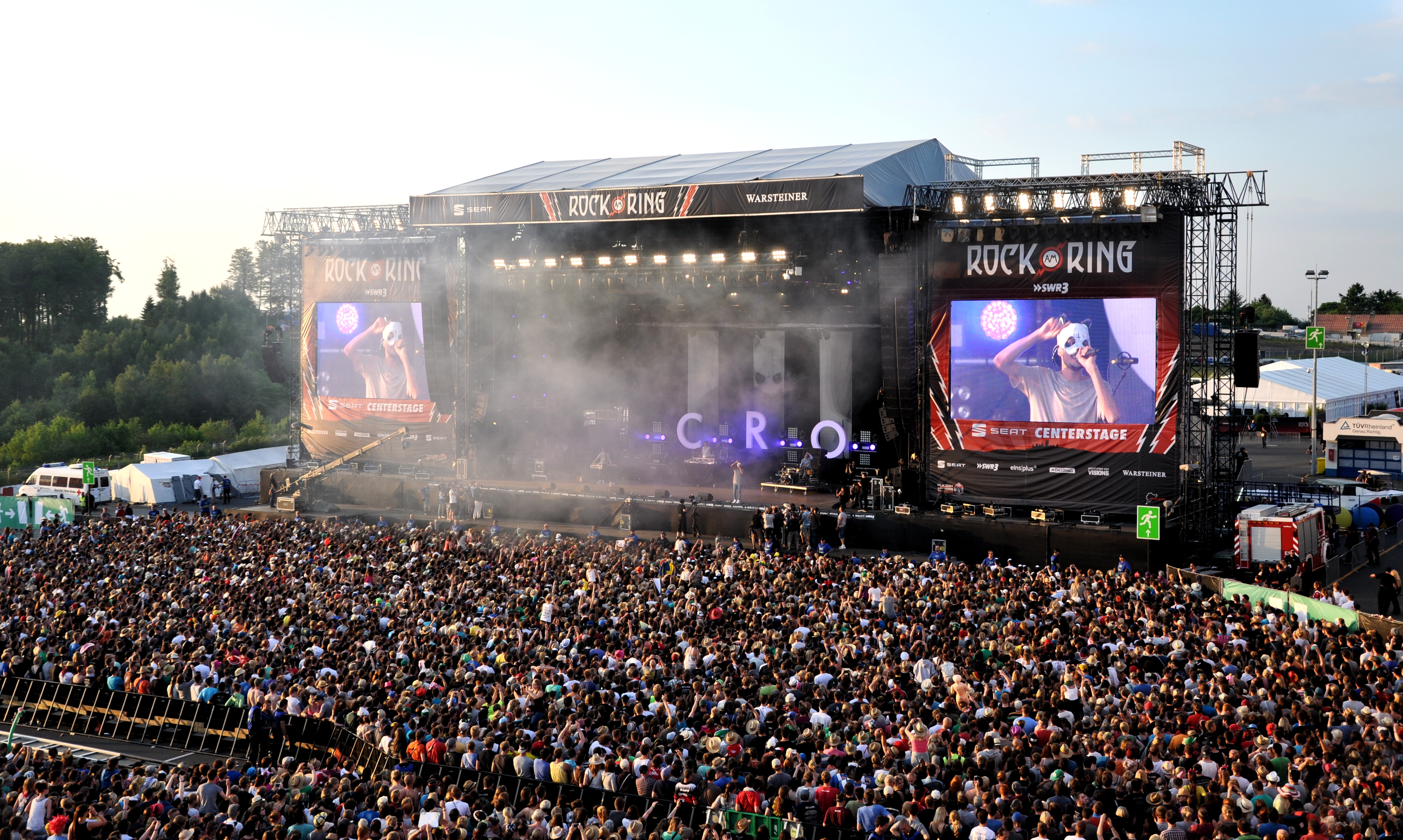
- Rock am Ring, 2013
- Genre: Heavy metal, punk rock, rock
- Dates: Usually first weekend in June
- Locations: Rock am Ring: Nürburgring, Nürburg, Rhineland-Palatinate, Germany; Rock im Park: Zeppelinfeld, Nuremberg, Bavaria, Germany
- Years active: 1985–1988, 1991–2019, 2022–present
- Founders: Marek Lieberberg
- Website: Rock am Ring: rock-am-ring.com/en Rock im Park: rock-im-park.com/en

The Rock am Ring (German for "Rock at [the] Ring") and Rock im Park ("Rock in [the] Park") festivals are two simultaneous rock music festivals held annually in Germany. While Rock am Ring takes place at the Nürburgring race track paddock at the village of Nürburg, Rock im Park takes place some 200 miles away in Nuremberg, at the Zeppelinfeld which also is used as a race track paddock. Rock am Ring festival was founded by Marek Lieberberg in 1985.

The two festivals are usually regarded as one event sharing nearly identical lineups. All artists perform one day at the Nürburgring and another day in Nuremberg during the three-day event. There have been minor exceptions in the past years where an artist would be announced for one of the festivals only. Combined, Rock im Park and Rock am Ring are the largest music festivals held in Germany and one of the largest in the world with a combined attendance of over 150,000 people in 2007, selling out both events in advance for the first time.

== History ==
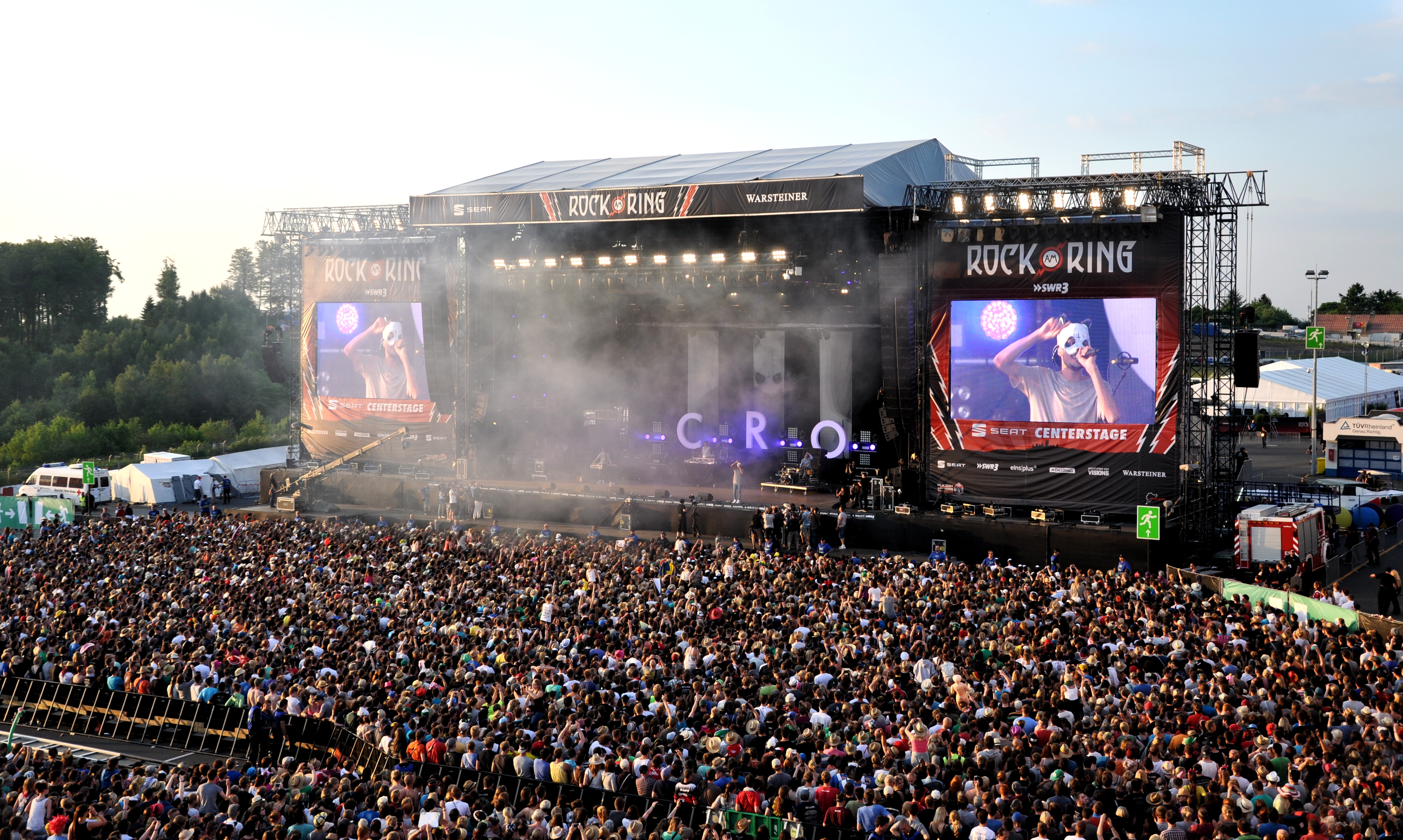
Center Stage 2013, the German rapper Cro performing

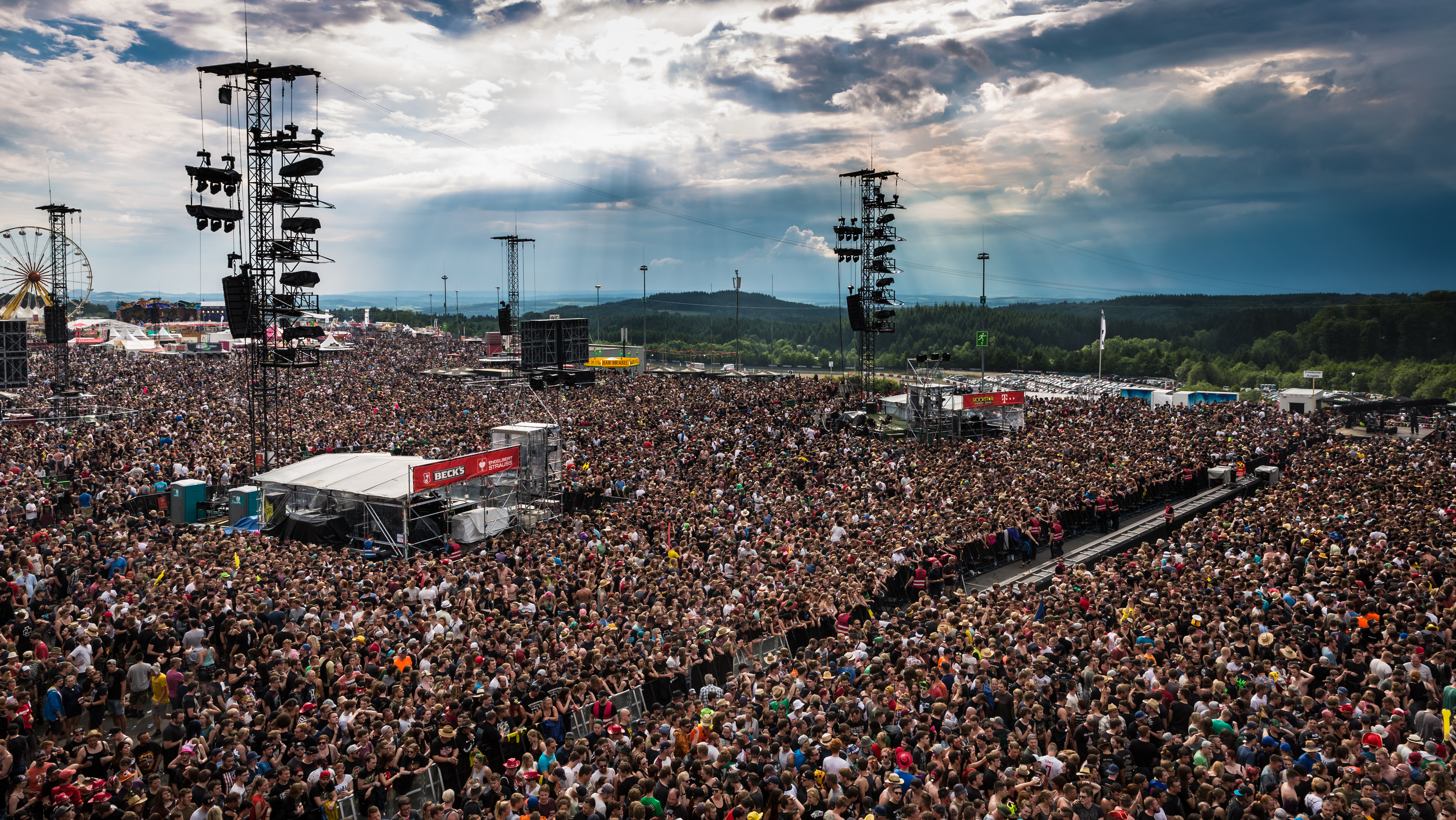
Festival site Rock am Ring 2017

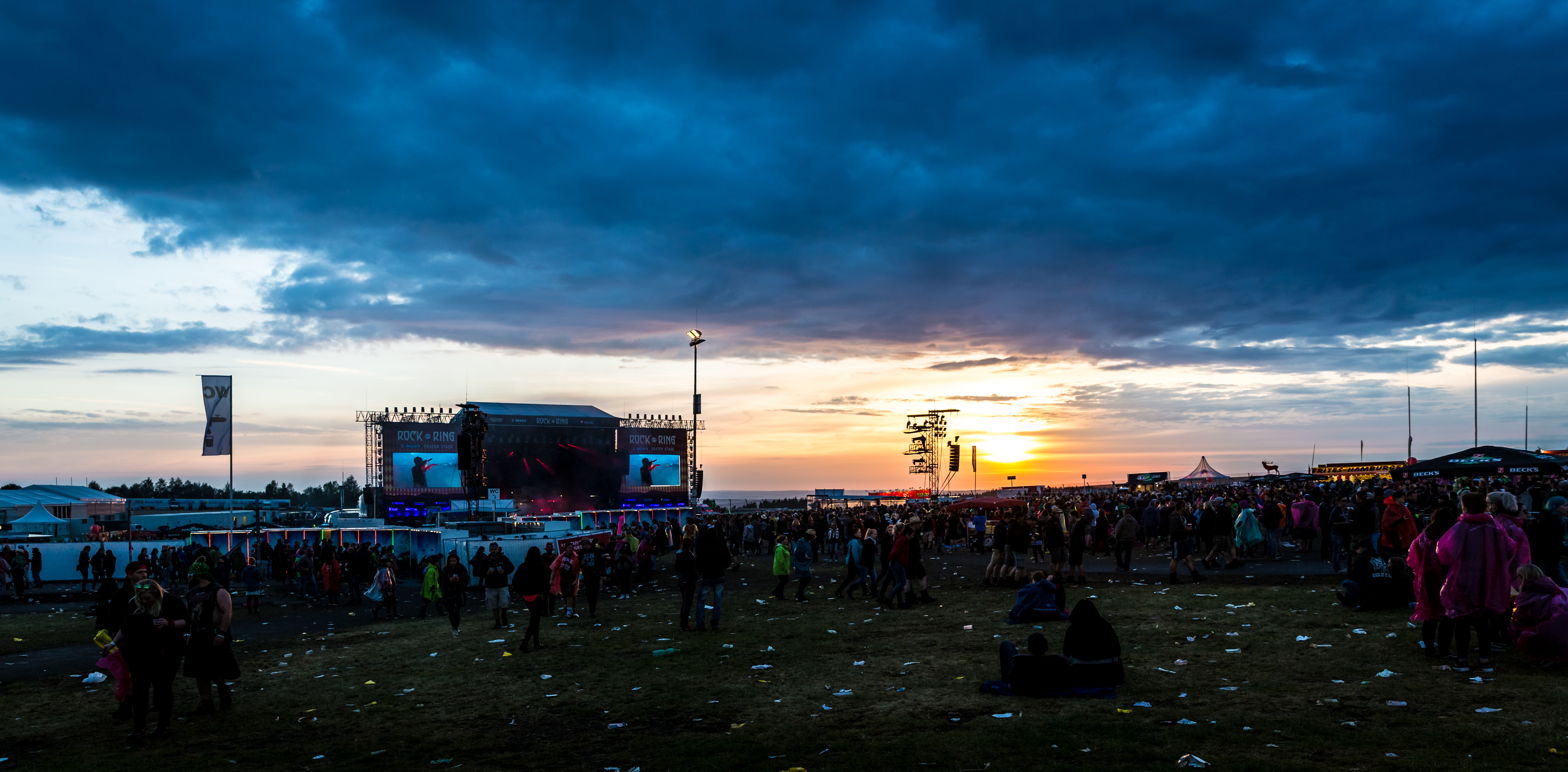
Festival site Rock am Ring 2017

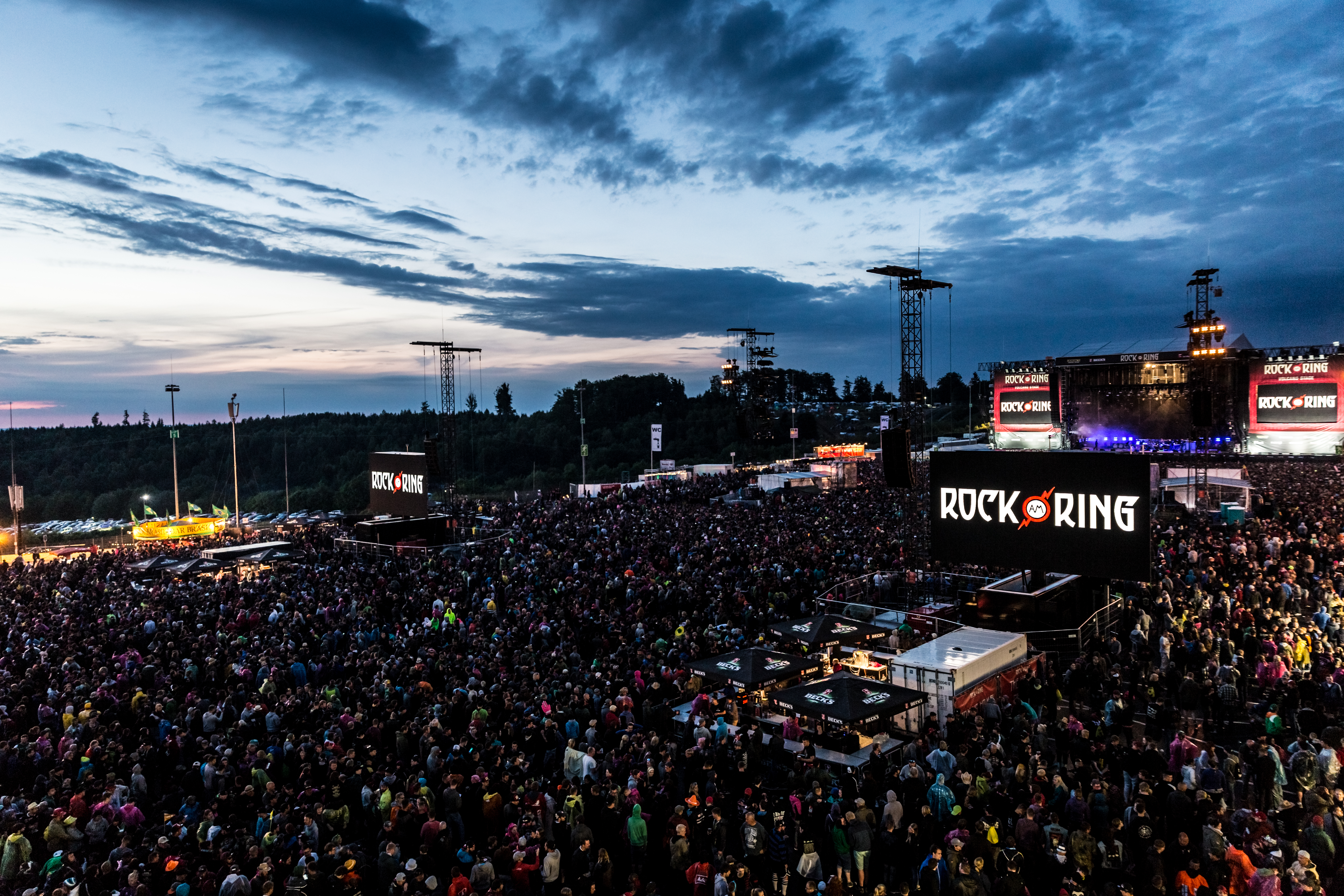
Festival site Rock am Ring 2017

In 1980, German concert promoter Marek Lieberberg initiated a festival project on the Nordschleife part of the Nürburgring, but it failed due to protests from locals and a lack of parking spaces.

In 1985, Lieberberg was inspired to bring to the German region of the Palatinate (Pfalz) the atmosphere that reigned in the town of Bethel during the first Woodstock festival. The first managing director of the new Nürburgring complex, Rainer Mertel, placed his trust in Lieberberg. Thus, in 1985, Lieberberg founded the Rock am Ring festival.

Rock am Ring was originally planned as a one-time festival on the Nürburgring motorsports complex, celebrating the inauguration of a newer, shorter version of the race track in 1985, but due to its commercial success (with 75,000 audience members), it was decided to make the concert an annual event. However, after a dip in attendance for the 1988 event, the festival was put on hiatus for two years. In 1991, the festival returned with a new concept: as well as featuring well-known artists, event organizers present lesser known up-and-coming bands to the public. In 1993, Rock im Park took place for the first time in Vienna. For the 1994 event, Rock im Park moved to the disused Munich-Riem airport, and the following year to Munich's Olympiastadion, where it found a home for the 1995 and 1996 event. In 1997 Rock im Park moved to Nuremberg's Frankenstadion where it was held until the venue was unavailable in 2004 because the stadium was being renovated for the 2006 Football World Cup. Since 2004 the venue moved again to the current Zeppelinfeld, where Rock im Park was since held with the exception of the 2006 festival, which due to the World Cup was moved to the nearby Luitpoldhain park.

The 2007 festival was used in a science experiment to test the effects of large bodies of people simultaneously jumping. The experiment data was used to calculate the result if the entire Chinese population were to jump in unison. The experiment concluded no significant results would come from the theoretical event.

After 29 editions of Rock am Ring, the new private owner of the Nürburgring decided that the contract would not be extended. The festival organizers continued at another location in 2015 and 2016 (Mendig Air Base/Vulkaneifel), returning to the Nürburgring in 2017.

=== Venues ===
Venue History
Year	Rock am Ring	Rock im Park
1985	Nürburgring, Nürburg	–
1986	Nürburgring, Nürburg	–
1987	Nürburgring, Nürburg	–
1988	Nürburgring, Nürburg	–
1989	–	–
1990	–	–
1991	Nürburgring, Nürburg	–
1992	Nürburgring, Nürburg	–
1993	Nürburgring, Nürburg	Rock in Wien; Ernst-Happel-Stadion, Vienna
1994	Nürburgring, Nürburg	Rock im Riem; Flughafen München Riem, Munich
1995	Nürburgring, Nürburg	Rock im Riem; Olympic Stadium, Munich
1996	Nürburgring, Nürburg	Rock im Riem; Olympic Stadium, Munich
1997	Nürburgring, Nürburg	Frankenstadion, Nuremberg
1998	Nürburgring, Nürburg	Frankenstadion, Nuremberg
1999	Nürburgring, Nürburg	Frankenstadion, Nuremberg
2000	Nürburgring, Nürburg	Frankenstadion, Nuremberg
2001	Nürburgring, Nürburg	Frankenstadion, Nuremberg
2002	Nürburgring, Nürburg	Frankenstadion, Nuremberg
2003	Nürburgring, Nürburg	Frankenstadion, Nuremberg
2004	Nürburgring, Nürburg	Zeppelinfeld, Nuremberg
2005	Nürburgring, Nürburg	Zeppelinfeld, Nuremberg
2006	Nürburgring, Nürburg	Luitpoldarena, Nuremberg
2007	Nürburgring, Nürburg	Zeppelinfeld, Nuremberg
2008	Nürburgring, Nürburg	Zeppelinfeld, Nuremberg
2009	Nürburgring, Nürburg	Zeppelinfeld, Nuremberg
2010	Nürburgring, Nürburg	Zeppelinfeld, Nuremberg
2011	Nürburgring, Nürburg	Zeppelinfeld, Nuremberg
2012	Nürburgring, Nürburg	Zeppelinfeld, Nuremberg
2013	Nürburgring, Nürburg	Zeppelinfeld, Nuremberg
2014	Nürburgring, Nürburg	Zeppelinfeld, Nuremberg
2015	Mendig Air Base, Mendig	Zeppelinfeld, Nuremberg
2016	Mendig Air Base, Mendig	Zeppelinfeld, Nuremberg
2017	Nürburgring, Nürburg	Zeppelinfeld, Nuremberg
2018	Nürburgring, Nürburg	Zeppelinfeld, Nuremberg
2019	Nürburgring, Nürburg	Zeppelinfeld, Nuremberg
2020	Cancelled due to the COVID-19 pandemic	
2021	Cancelled due to the COVID-19 pandemic	
2022	Nürburgring, Nürburg	Zeppelinfeld, Nuremberg
2023	Nürburgring, Nürburg	Zeppelinfeld, Nuremberg
2024	Nürburgring, Nürburg	Zeppelinfeld, Nuremberg
2025	Nürburgring, Nürburg	Zeppelinfeld, Nuremberg

== Past dates and headliners ==
Date	Bands	Attendance (RaR)	Attendance (RiP)
25–26 May 1985	U2, Joe Cocker, Foreigner, Marius Müller-Westernhagen, Marillion, Chris de Burgh, Rick Springfield, Gianna Nannini, the Alarm, Lone Justice, Immaculate Fools, REO Speedwagon, Saga, Mink DeVille, Russ Ballard, Night Ranger, Huey Lewis and the News, Shakatak	75,000	-
14–15 June 1986	Simple Minds headlining the Cure, INXS, James Taylor, Simply Red, Echo & the Bunnymen, Talk Talk, the Bangles, Cock Robin, Feargal Sharkey, and the Waterboys.	50,000	-
6–7 June 1987	David Bowie, Eurythmics, Udo Lindenberg, UB40	60,000	-
11–12 June 1988	Marius Müller-Westernhagen, Fleetwood Mac, Chris Rea, Imperiet	30,000	-
28–30 June 1991	INXS, Toto, Sting, the Sisters of Mercy, the Jeremy Days	51,000	-
5–7 June 1992	Marillion, Saga, Bryan Adams, Elton John, Pearl Jam, the Cult, Tori Amos, Héroes del Silencio	42,000	-
29–30 May 1993	INXS, Faith No More, Brian May, Robert Plant, Héroes del Silencio, Melissa Etheridge, Def Leppard, Danzig, the Black Crowes, Leonard Cohen, Hothouse Flowers, the Jayhawks, World Party, Ugly Kid Joe	50,000	-
21–23 May 1994	Aerosmith, Peter Gabriel, Clawfinger, Nina Hagen, Radiohead, Therapy?, Rage Against the Machine, the Smashing Pumpkins	70,000	-
3–4 June 1995	Van Halen, Bon Jovi, Megadeth, Bad Religion, Otto Waalkes, Pretenders	70,000	-
24–26 May 1996	Rage Against the Machine, Bryan Adams, Dave Matthews Band, Herbert Grönemeyer, Die Toten Hosen, Sting, Fugees, Alanis Morissette, Héroes del Silencio, Bush, Mike + The Mechanics, Sepultura, Rancid, Paradise Lost	75,000	-
16–18 May 1997	Soraya, Kiss, Aerosmith, Die Ärzte, Supertramp, Texas, Neneh Cherry, Faith No More	70,000	40,000
29–31 May 1998	Bob Dylan, Genesis, Ozzy Osbourne, Rammstein, BAP, the Prodigy, Bad Religion, Guano Apes, Godsmack, Van Halen, Therapy?, Soulflower	58,000	not specified
21–23 May 1999	Metallica, Bryan Adams, Alanis Morissette, Xavier Naidoo, Kid Rock, Robbie Williams, Faithless, Skunk Anansie, Placebo, Travis, Garbage.	63,000	30,000
9–11 June 2000	Oasis, Pearl Jam, Slipknot, Die Toten Hosen, Sting, Eurythmics, Korn, Rage Against the Machine	75,000	40,000
1–3 June 2001	Blackmail, HIM, A-ha, Anastacia, Limp Bizkit, Linkin Park, Papa Roach, Radiohead, Alanis Morissette, Kid Rock, Godsmack, OutKast, Reamonn, Hed PE, Mudvayne, Sammy Deluxe	65,000	50,000
17–19 May 2002	Lenny Kravitz, Carlos Santana, Faithless, Neil Young, Jamiroquai, Wyclef Jean, P.O.D., Drowning Pool, Ozzy Osbourne, Alien Ant Farm, System of a Down, Natalie Merchant, Bad Religion, Muse, Fettes Brot	50,000	40,000
6–8 June 2003	Iron Maiden, Metallica, Placebo (substituting for Linkin Park as a result of Chester Bennington being hospitalized with an abdominal parasite infection), Audioslave, Evanescence, Apocalyptica, Marilyn Manson, Deftones, Queens of the Stone Age, Zwan, the Cardigans, Maná, Molotov, Lifehouse, the Donnas, Murderdolls, Reamonn, Silverchair, the Hives, the Dandy Warhols, Die Happy, blackmail, MIA., Joachim Deutschland, Whyte Seeds, Stone Sour, Clawfinger Emil Bulls, Dave Gahan, Stereophonics, Badly Drawn Boy, Turin Brakes, Tomte, the Ark, Saybia, Surrogat, Disturbed, Boysetsfire, Moby, Beginner, ASD (Afrob & Samy Deluxe), Patrice, Saïan Supa Crew, Deichkind, Kool Savas, Creutzfeld & Jakob, Rolf Stahlhofen	75,000	40,000
4–6 June 2004	Red Hot Chili Peppers, Muse, Nickelback, Evanescence, Die Toten Hosen, Faithless, Bad Religion, Moloko, Avril Lavigne, Wir sind Helden, Judas Priest (Rock im Park only), Linkin Park (Rock am Ring only), Lostprophets, Motörhead, Sportfreunde Stiller, the Rasmus, Seeed, Korn, 3 Doors Down, Lagwagon, H-Blockx, Dover, Machine Head	65,000	40,000
3–5 June 2005	headliners Iron Maiden, R.E.M., HIM, Wir sind Helden, Mudvayne, Melody Club, Green Day, Incubus, the Hives, Slayer, Marilyn Manson, 3 Doors Down, Helmet, Billy Idol, Velvet Revolver, Feeder, the Prodigy, the Chemical Brothers, Slipknot, Mötley Crüe, Fettes Brot, Mando Diao, Subway to Sally, Apocalyptica, Die Toten Hosen, Wednesday 13, Dir En Grey, Avenged Sevenfold, Kagerou, Maroon 5, Papa Roach, Within Temptation, Weezer, Black Raven, Garbage.	70,000	45,000
2–4 June 2006	headliners Guns N' Roses, Kaizers Orchestra, Korn and Metallica, Angels & Airwaves, Trivium, Alter Bridge, Avenged Sevenfold, Cradle of Filth, Depeche Mode, the Darkness, Placebo, Morrissey, Franz Ferdinand, Deftones, Editors, Bela B., Nelly Furtado, Sportfreunde Stiller, Kaiser Chiefs, Tool, Jamiroquai, Dir En Grey, Atreyu, In Flames, Opeth, Bloodhound Gang, Kagerou, Danko Jones, Bullet for My Valentine, Alice in Chains, Stone Sour, Point Blank, the Zutons, Strapping Young Lad, She Wants Revenge, Lacuna Coil	80,000	49,000
1–3 June 2007	headliners Linkin Park, Papa Roach, the Smashing Pumpkins, Die Ärzte and Slayer, Evanescence, Korn, the White Stripes, Velvet Revolver, Thirty Seconds to Mars, Muse, Beatsteaks, Billy Talent, Mando Diao, Wir sind Helden, Dave Matthews Band (withdrew from the event), the Hives, Arctic Monkeys, My Chemical Romance, Kaiser Chiefs, Jan Delay & Disko No. 1, M.I.A., the Kooks, Wolfmother, Stone Sour, Amy Winehouse (withdrew from the event), As I Lay Dying, Bloodsimple, Breed 77, the Cat Empire, Chimaira, the Cribs, Fair to Midland, Disco Ensemble, Enter Shikari, the Fratellis, Funeral for a Friend, Ghosts, Gogol Bordello, Good Charlotte, the Higher, Hinder, Killswitch Engage, Lamb of God, Little Man Tate, Machine Head, Maxïmo Park, McQueen, Megadeth, Mr. Hudson & the Library, Paolo Nutini, Papa Roach (canceled Rock im Park performance due to vocal problems), Razorlight, Scissor Sisters, Silverstein, the Sounds, Sugarplum Fairy, Tele, Type O Negative, Under the Influence of Giants, the Used, Zoot Woman, Aiden, Miasma, Charlotte Hatherley, DevilDriver, Down Below, DragonForce, Finley, Gallows, Groove Armada, Head Automatica, In This Moment, Kilian, Lez Zeppelin, the Long Blondes (Rock im Park only), Lost Alone, Mutemath, Ohrbooten, One Fine Day, Paramore, Pohlmann, Revolverheld, Saosin, Smoke Blow, Sunrise Avenue, Turbostaat, the Last Exit to Anywhere	82,000 for the first time sold out in advance sale	60,000
6–8 June 2008	headliners Die Toten Hosen, Rage Against the Machine, Metallica; also HIM, the Prodigy, Incubus, Sportfreunde Stiller, the Verve, the Offspring, Motörhead, Queens of the Stone Age, Eagles of Death Metal, Fettes Brot, Culcha Candela, the Fratellis, Serj Tankian, Bullet for My Valentine, Babyshambles, Nightwish, Lostprophets, In Flames, Kate Nash, Kid Rock, Alter Bridge, Simple Plan, Madsen, Dimmu Borgir, Bad Religion, Justice, Disturbed, 36 Crazyfists, Rooney, Stereophonics, Manic Street Preachers, Airbourne, Saxon, Pendulum, Danko Jones	more than 85,000 sold out in advance sale	75,000
5–7 June 2009	headliners Marilyn Manson, Billy Talent, Limp Bizkit, Placebo, the Killers, Korn, Slipknot, Mando Diao; also 2raumwohnung, Alexisonfire, All That Remains, ...And You Will Know Us by the Trail of Dead, Basement Jaxx, Biffy Clyro, Black Stone Cherry, Bloc Party, Bring Me the Horizon, Chester French, Chris Cornell, Dir En Grey, DragonForce, Dredg, Enter Shikari, Esser, Expatriate, Flogging Molly, Gallows, Guano Apes, Ich Bin Bunt, Jan Delay & Disko No. 1, Juliette Lewis, Kettcar, Kilians, Killswitch Engage, Kitty, Daisy & Lewis, Little Man Tate, Machine Head, Madina Lake, Madness, M.I.A., Middle Class Rut, New Found Glory, Pain, Papa Roach, Peter Bjorn and John, Phoenix, Peter Fox, Polarkreis 18, Razorlight, Reamonn, Scouting for Girls, Selig, Sevendust, Shinedown, Steadlür, Sugarplum Fairy, the All-American Rejects, the Crave, the Gaslight Anthem, the Kooks, the Prodigy, the Rifles, the Soundtrack of Our Lives, the Script, the Subways, Tomte, Trivium, Volbeat, White Lies	80,000 sold out in advance sale	60,000
3–6 June 2010	headliners Rammstein, Muse, Rage Against the Machine, Kiss, HIM, Thirty Seconds to Mars; also A Day to Remember, Airbourne, Alice in Chains, Alkaline Trio, As I Lay Dying, Bad Religion, Broilers, Bullet for My Valentine, Cancer Bats, Carpark North, Crime in Stereo, Crystal Castles, Cypress Hill, Das Actionteam, Delphic, Die Sterne, Disco Ensemble, Dizzee Rascal, Dommin, Editors, Donots, Ellie Goulding, Eyes of Solace, Fertig, Los!, Five Finger Death Punch, Foals, Gentleman, Gogol Bordello, Gossip, H-Blockx, Halestorm, HammerFall, Heaven Shall Burn, Jan Delay & Disko No. 1, Jay-Z, Kamelot, Kasabian, Katatonia, Kate Nash, Kiss, Lamb of God, Lazer, Lissie, Motörhead, Muse, OneRepublic, Pendulum, Rage Against the Machine, Rise Against, Rock Rotten's 9mm Assi Rock'n'Roll, Roman Fischer, Slash, Slayer, Sportfreunde Stiller (unplugged), Stone Sour, Sweethead, Taking Dawn, Taylor Hawkins and the Coattail Riders, the Cribs, the Damned Things, the Hives, the New Black, the Sounds, the Storm, Them Crooked Vultures, Tocotronic, Turbostaat, Volbeat, We Are the Fallen, Whitechapel, WhoMadeWho, Year Long Disaster, You Me at Six, Zebrahead	86,500 sold out in advance sale	60,500
3–5 June 2011	headliners System of a Down, Coldplay, Kings of Leon; also In Flames, Mando Diao, Avenged Sevenfold, Bring Me the Horizon; Beatsteaks, the Gaslight Anthem, Volbeat, Hurts, the BossHoss, Jazzkantine	84,000	55,200
1–3 June 2012	headliners Linkin Park, Metallica, Die Toten Hosen; also Evanescence, Soundgarden, Tenacious D, Billy Talent, Machine Head, Marilyn Manson, Trivium, the Offspring, Kasabian, Skrillex, Gossip, Gojira, Killswitch Engage	86,500 sold out in advance sale	76,000
7–9 June 2013	headliners Green Day, Volbeat, Thirty Seconds to Mars; also the Killers, the Prodigy, Seeed, Fettes Brot, Korn, Limp Bizkit, Paramore, Bullet for My Valentine, Hurts, Bad Religion, Phoenix, Stone Sour, the Bosshoss, Bring Me the Horizon, Tocotronic, Biffy Clyro, Papa Roach, Love and Death	87,000 sold out in advance sale	72,000
5–8 June 2014	headliners Linkin Park, Metallica, Iron Maiden, Kings of Leon; also the Offspring, Nine Inch Nails, Queens of the Stone Age, Avenged Sevenfold, Die Fantastischen Vier, Fall Out Boy, Slayer, Rob Zombie, Anthrax, Trivium, Gogol Bordello	more than 80,000	70,000
5–7 June 2015	headliners Foo Fighters, Die Toten Hosen, Slipknot, the Prodigy; also A Day to Remember, Asking Alexandria, Bad Religion, Bastille, Body Count Feat. Ice-T, Eagles of Death Metal, Enter Shikari, Godsmack, Hollywood Undead, In Flames, Interpol, Lamb of God, Marilyn Manson, Motörhead, Papa Roach, Parkway Drive, Pop Evil, Rise Against, Royal Republic, Skindred, Slash, Three Days Grace, Yellowcard, Zebrahead	more than 90,000	75,000
3–5 June 2016	headliners Red Hot Chili Peppers, Black Sabbath, Volbeat; also Amon Amarth, Architects, Billy Talent, Breaking Benjamin, Bullet for My Valentine, Deftones, Disturbed, Heaven Shall Burn, Killswitch Engage, Panic! at the Disco, Major Lazer, Of Mice & Men, Shinedown, Tenacious D	92,500 sold out in advance sale and attendance record	70,000
2–4 June 2017	headliners Rammstein, Die Toten Hosen, System of a down; also Airbourne, Alter Bridge, Beartooth, Five Finger Death Punch, Frank Carter & the Rattlesnakes, Gojira, In Flames, Macklemore & Ryan Lewis, Pierce the Veil, Prophets of Rage, Simple Plan, Skindred, Sum 41	87,000 sold out in advance sale	88,500
1–3 June 2018	headliners Foo Fighters, Thirty Seconds to Mars, Gorillaz, Muse; also Asking Alexandria, Avenged Sevenfold, Babymetal, Bad Religion, Bullet for My Valentine, Ego Kill Talent, Enter Shikari, Good Charlotte, Hollywood Undead, Jonathan Davis, Marilyn Manson, Meshuggah, Nothing But Thieves, Nothing More, Parkway Drive, Rise Against, Shinedown, Snow Patrol, Stone Sour	70.000	
7–9 June 2019	headliners Slipknot, Die Antwoord, Die Ärzte, Tool, Slayer, Tenacious D, the Smashing Pumpkins, Bring Me the Horizon, Dropkick Murphys, Sabaton, Bastille, the 1975, the BossHoss, Alligatoah, SDP, Amon Amarth, Architects, Foals, Alice in Chains	85,000	70,000
5–7 June 2020	headliners System of a Down, Green Day, Volbeat, Deftones, Billy Talent, Korn, Broilers, Disturbed, the Offspring, Weezer, Bilderbuch, Wanda, Alan Walker, Heaven Shall Burn, Yungblud, Powerwolf, Of Mice & Men, Motionless in White, August Burns Red	Cancelled due to the COVID-19 pandemic	
11–13 June 2021	headliners System of a Down, Green Day, Volbeat, Deftones, Billy Talent, Korn, Broilers, Disturbed, the Offspring, Weezer, Bilderbuch, A Day to Remember, Alan Walker, Fall Out Boy, Of Mice & Men, Powerwolf, Gojira, You Me at Six, Yungblud	Cancelled due to the COVID-19 pandemic	
3–5 June 2022	headliners Green Day, Muse, Volbeat, Broilers, Billy Talent, Korn, A Day to Remember, the Offspring, Deftones, Weezer, Donots, Bullet for My Valentine, Black Veil Brides, Scooter, Sportfreunde Stiller, Casper, Royal Republic, Airbourne, August Burns Red, Sondaschule	90,000	70.000

=== 2008 festival ===
The 2008 festival took place on 6–8 June 2008. 91 acts were officially confirmed. Both festivals were sold out on 1 May.

Confirmed acts:
3 Doors Down (replacing Chris Cornell, who backed out to record an album), 36 Crazyfists, Against Me!, Airbourne, Alpha Galates, Alter Bridge, Animal Alpha, Babyshambles, Bad Religion, Bedouin Soundclash, the Black Dahlia Murder, Black Stone Cherry, Black Tide, Bloodlights, Booka Shade, Bullet for My Valentine, CSS, Cavalera Conspiracy, Chiodos, Coheed and Cambria, Culcha Candela, Danko Jones, Die Toten Hosen, Dimmu Borgir, Disco Ensemble, Disturbed, Eagles of Death Metal, EL*KE, Fair to Midland, Fettes Brot, Fiction Plane, Filter, Finger Eleven, From First to Last, Gavin DeGraw, Gavin Rossdale, High on Fire, HIM, Hot Chip, In Case of Fire, In Flames, Incubus, Infadels, Jimmy Eat World, Joe Lean & the Jing Jang Jong, Johnossi, Jonathan Davis, Justice, Kate Nash, Kid Rock, Kill Hannah, Lostprophets, Madsen, Manic Street Preachers, Masters of Reality, Metallica, Motörhead, Nightwish, Oomph!, Opeth, Paramore, Pete Murray, Queens of the Stone Age, Rafael Weber, Rage Against the Machine, Rival Schools, Róisín Murphy, Rooney, Rose Tattoo, Saul Williams, Saxon, Seether, Serj Tankian, Silverstein, Simple Plan, Söhne Mannheims, Sonic Syndicate, Sportfreunde Stiller, Stereophonics, Steriogram, Takida, the Fall of Troy, the Fratellis, the Futureheads, the Hellacopters, the Offspring, the Prodigy, the Streets, the Verve, Tokyo Police Club, Turisas and ZOX.

Glory of Joann's MySpace profile lists them as performing at Rock am Ring, and ringrocker lists them as officially confirmed.

=== 2009 festival ===
The headline acts for 2009 were: Limp Bizkit, Slipknot, the Prodigy, Korn, Marilyn Manson, the Killers, Placebo and Billy Talent. Other bands included 2raumwohnung, Alexisonfire, All That Remains, ...And You Will Know Us by the Trail of Dead, Basement Jaxx, Biffy Clyro, Black Stone Cherry, Bloc Party, Bring Me the Horizon, Chester French, Chris Cornell, Dir En Grey, DragonForce, Dredg, Enter Shikari, Esser, Expatriate, Five Finger Death Punch, Flogging Molly, Forbidden Theory, Gallows, Guano Apes, Hollywood Undead, Ich Bin Bunt, Jan Delay & Disko No. 1, Juliette Lewis, Kettcar, Kilians, Killswitch Engage, Kitty, Daisy & Lewis, Little Man Tate, Machine Head, Madina Lake, Madness, Mando Diao, M.I.A., Middle Class Rut, New Found Glory, Pain, Papa Roach, Peter Bjorn and John, Peter Fox, Phoenix, Polarkreis 18, Razorlight, Reamonn, Scouting for Girls, Selig, Sevendust, Shinedown, Staind, Steadlür, Sugarplum Fairy, the All-American Rejects, the Crave, the Gaslight Anthem, the Kooks, the Rifles, the Script, the Soundtrack of Our Lives (OEOC), the Subways, Tomte, Trivium, Volbeat, White Lies Rock am Ring tickets were sold out by March 26.

=== 2011 festival ===
The headliners for the 2011 festival were System of a Down and Coldplay. Other bands included Disturbed, Alter Bridge, Rob Zombie, Interpol, Avenged Sevenfold, Social Distortion, Volbeat, Beatsteaks, August Burns Red, the BossHoss, Hurts, Korn, Madsen, Mando Diao, the Kooks, Sevendust, In Flames, 3 Doors Down, Lifehouse, the Devil Wears Prada, Ash and the Gaslight Anthem.

Center Stage (Rock am Ring)
Friday, 3	Saturday, 4	Sunday, 5
Kings of Leon; Mando Diao; Social Distortion; The Gaslight Anthem; Plain White T's; We Are Scientists; Thees Uhlmann & Band	Coldplay; Söhne Mannheims; The Kooks; Hurts; Ash; The Naked and Famous; Morning Parade	System of a Down; Beatsteaks; Volbeat; Avenged Sevenfold; Hollywood Undead; Millencolin; Mastodon

=== 2012 festival ===
Acts for the 2012 edition included As I Lay Dying, Anthrax, Awolnation, Billy Talent, Crystal Castles, Deichkind, DevilDriver, Dick Brave and the Backbeats, Die Toten Hosen, Donots, Enter Shikari, Evanescence, Example, Gossip, Gojira, Guano Apes, Kasabian, Keane, Korn, The Koletzkis, Killswitch Engage, Lamb of God, Lexy & K-Paul, Linkin Park, Machine Head, Marilyn Manson, Metallica, MIA., Motörhead, The Offspring, Opeth, Periphery, Shinedown, Skrillex, Soundgarden, Tenacious D, The Subways, and Trivium.

Center Stage (Rock am Ring)
Friday, 1	Saturday, 2	Sunday, 3
Linkin Park; Soundgarden; Gossip; Kasabian; Cypress Hill; The Subways; Tribes	Metallica; Billy Talent; Tenacious D Refused; Enter Shikari; Shinedown; Gojira	Die Toten Hosen; The Offspring; Dropkick Murphys; Dick Brave & The Backbeats; Donots; King Charles

=== 2013 festival ===
2013's edition was sold out since the beginning of January, and included acts like Thirty Seconds to Mars, Green Day, The Prodigy, Fettes Brot, Volbeat, Stone Sour, Sportfreunde Stiller, Simple Plan, The Killers, Paramore, All Time Low, Fun., Imagine Dragons, Papa Roach, Korn, Limp Bizkit, Bullet for My Valentine, Amon Amarth, A Day to Remember, Bring Me the Horizon, Asking Alexandria, The Bosshoss, Airbourne, Bush, Hacktivist, The Bloody Beetroots, Hurts, Phoenix, Tocotronic, Biffy Clyro, Stereophonics, Kate Nash, Selig, Bosse, Kraftklub, Bad Religion, Royal Republic, Seeed, Casper, The Wombats, ASAP Rocky, Five Finger Death Punch, Coheed And Cambria, Coal Chamber, Escape the Fate, Newsted and Pierce the Veil

Center Stage (Rock am Ring)
Friday, 7	Saturday, 8	Sunday, 9
Thirty Seconds to Mars; Fettes Brot; Cro; Paramore; Fun. Imagine Dragons; The Strypes	The Prodigy; Volbeat; Stone Sour; The Bosshoss; Airbourne; Papa Roach; Hacktivist	Green Day; Sportfreunde Stiller; Kraftklub; Simple Plan; Bad Religion; Royal Republic; All Time Low

=== 2014 festival ===
The 2014 edition of Rock am Ring was spread over 4 days. Headliners: Iron Maiden, Kings of Leon, Linkin Park, Metallica . Other bands included Alligatoah, Alter Bridge, Avenged Sevenfold, Babyshambles, Booka Shade, Die Fantastischen Vier, Fall Out Boy, Ghost, Gogol Bordello, Heaven Shall Burn, In Extremo, Jake Bugg, Jan Delay & Disko No. 1, John Newman, Karnivool, Klangkarussell Live, Kvelertak, Left Boy, Mando Diao, Marteria, Mastodon, Maxïmo Park, Milky Chance, Nine Inch Nails, Of Mice & Men, Opeth, Portugal. The Man, Powerman 5000, Queens of the Stone Age, Rob Zombie, Rudimental, SDP, Sierra Kidd, Slayer, Suicide Silence, Teesy, Triggerfinger, The Offspring.

Center Stage (Rock am Ring)
Thursday, 5	Friday, 6	Saturday, 7	Sunday, 8
Iron Maiden; The Offspring; Pennywise; Falling in Reverse; Klangkarussell; Rudimental; Cro	Kings Of Leon; Mando Diao; Kasabian; Rea Garvey; Jake Bugg; John Newman; Rival Sons	Linkin Park; Die Fantastischen Vier; Fall Out Boy; Alligatoah; Kaiser Chiefs; The Pretty Reckless; 257ers	Metallica; Avenged Sevenfold; Alter Bridge; In Extremo; Trivium; Black Stone Cherry

=== 2015 festival ===
In 2015 the festival moved to a new location, Mendig Air Base Headliners: Foo Fighters, Die Toten Hosen, Slipknot, Motionless in White. Other bands included A Day to Remember, Asking Alexandria, Bad Religion, Bastille, Body Count Feat. Ice-T, Eagles of Death Metal, Enter Shikari, Godsmack, Hollywood Undead, In Flames, Interpol, Lamb of God, Marilyn Manson, Motörhead, Papa Roach, Parkway Drive, Pop Evil, Rise Against, Royal Republic, Skindred, Slash, Three Days Grace, Yellowcard and Zebrahead.

Volcano Stage (Rock am Ring)
Friday, 5	Saturday, 6	Sunday, 7
Die Toten Hosen; Rise Against; Broilers; A Day to Remember; Bad Religion; Yellowcard; Donots	The Prodigy; Kraftklub; Slash Feat. Myles Kennedy; Interpol; Royal Republic; Zebrahead	Foo Fighters; Beatsteaks; Bastille; Frank Turner; Eagles of Death Metal; Ruen Brothers

Crater Stage (Rock am Ring)
Friday, 5	Saturday, 6	Sunday, 7
Fritz Kalkbrenner; Marilyn Manson; Clueso; Tocotronic; Mighty Oaks; Jamie T Ms Mr; Tüsn	Marsimoto; Deichkind; K.I.Z; Prinz Pi; Trailerpark; Bilderbuch; Feine Sahne Fischfilet; Antilopen Gang; Zugezogen Maskulin; Sondaschule	Slipknot; Motörhead; In Flames; Parkway Drive; Lamb of God; Papa Roach; Godsmack

=== 2016 festival ===
The festival was cancelled during the second day due to severe thunderstorms.

=== 2017 festival ===
In 2017 the festival returned to the Nürburgring. Headliners: Rammstein, Die Toten Hosen and System of a Down.

On the evening of 2 June 2017, the first day of the festival, the sold-out event with about 85,000 visitors was interrupted at 9:00 pm during a performance by the Düsseldorf band Broilers and the festival grounds cleared. The reason given was a terrorist situation. Other scheduled performances for Friday evening, including those of the headliner Rammstein and the rapper Marteria, were cancelled. Three men were arrested and checked in Hesse that same evening. Two of the men assigned to the Salafist scene in Hesse had access rights in the form of bracelets, which gave them direct access to many festival areas. One of the men was also suspected of having links to the terrorist scene. However, on the morning of 3 June, after a search of the grounds and a raid of the suspect's homes, the police announced that the suspicion of a threatening attack had not been substantiated, so that the festival could continue on Saturday noon. The access rights to the festival site had been received by the two main suspects due to a short-term staffing request from an external security service provider.

=== 2018 festival ===
The 2018 festival took place again in Nürburgring. Headliners: Thirty Seconds to Mars, Muse, Foo Fighters, Avenged Sevenfold, Marilyn Manson, and Gorillaz.

=== 2019 festival ===
The 2019 festival took place once again in Nürburgring. Headliners: Tool, Slipknot, Die Ärzte, and Slayer. Out of the 77 artists in the lineup, 36 percent were rock bands, equally representing alternative rock, hard rock, and indie rock, and 29 percent were metal bands.

Volcano Stage
Friday	Saturday	Sunday
Tool (US); The Smashing Pumpkins (US); Slash feat. Myles Kennedy & The Conspirators (US); Alice in Chains (US); Halestorm (US); Deadland Ritual (US); Badflower (US)	Die Ärzte (DE); Bring Me the Horizon (UK); Dropkick Murphys (US); Feine Sahne Fischfilet (DE); Seiler und Speer (AT); Underoath (US)	Slipknot (US); Tenacious D (US); The BossHoss (DE); Amon Amarth (SE); Godsmack (US); Atreyu (US)

Crater Stage
Friday	Saturday	Sunday
Bonez MC & RAF Camora (DE); The 1975 (UK); SDP (DE); Foals (UK); Cage the Elephant (US); Welshly Arms (US); Against the Current (US); Drangsal (DE) iDKHow (US); Palisades (US)	Die Antwoord (ZA); Slayer (US); Sabaton (SE); Architects (UK); Three Days Grace (CA); Trivium (US); Starset (US); I Prevail (US); The Fever 333 (US); The Hu (MN)	Marteria & Casper (DE); Bastille (UK); Alligatoah (DE); Kontra K (DE); KC Rebell (DE); BHZ (DE); BRKN (DE); DVTCH NORRIS (DE)

Alternastage
Friday	Saturday	Sunday
Arch Enemy (SE); Behemoth (PL); Beartooth (US); Kvelertak (NO); While She Sleeps (UK); Beyond the Black (DE); Bad Wolves (US); Power Trip (US); Fiend (US)	Alle Farben (DE); Left Boy (DE); Kovacs (NL); Alice Glass (CA); Nothing, Nowhere. (US); Juke Ross (US); Ryan Sheridan (IE); Jadu (DE)	Hot Water Music (US); Eagles of Death Metal (US); Black Rebel Motorcycle Club (US); Graveyard (SE); Kadavar (DE); The Struts (UK); Like a Storm (NZ); Adam Angst (DE); Coldrain (JP); Blackout Problems (DE)

=== 2020 festival ===
On 16 April 2020, the 2020 festival was cancelled due to the COVID-19 pandemic.

=== 2021 festival ===
On 10 March 2021, the 2021 festival was once more cancelled due to the COVID-19 pandemic.

=== 2022 festival ===
The festival resumed after being cancelled 2 years in a row due to the COVID-19 pandemic. The festival took place from 3 June through to 5 June 2022. The festivals headliners were Green Day, Muse, Deftones, Volbeat, Billy Talent, Korn, Weezer, The Offspring, Mastodon, and The Distillers.

Utopia Stage
Friday	Saturday	Sunday
Green Day (US); The Offspring (US); Broilers (DE); Maneskin (IT); Weezer (US); You Me At Six (UK); Donots (DE)	Muse (UK); Placebo (UK); Alligatoah (DE); RIN (DE); Sportfreunde Stiller (DE); Gang of Youths (AU); Kodaline (IE)	Volbeat (DK); Korn (US); Bullet For My Valentine (UK); Shinedown (US); Airbourne (AU); Black Veil Brides (US)

Mandora Stage
Friday	Saturday	Sunday
Scooter (DE); Marteria (DE); Jan Delay & Disko No. 1 (DE); BHZ (DE); Masked Wolf (AU); SSIO (DE); Serious Klein (DE); 102 Boyz (DE)	Casper (DE); Deftones (US); Fever 333 (US); Ice Nine Kills (US); Mastodon (US); Baroness (US); Ego Kill Talent (BR)	Billy Talent (CA); Beatsteaks (DE); A Day To Remember (US); Royal Republic (SE); Bush (UK); Tremonti (US); Myles Kennedy (US); Daughtry (US)

Orbit Stage
Friday	Saturday	Sunday
Danko Jones (CA); Stick To Your Guns (US); Caliban (DE); The Murder Capital (IE); Spiritbox (CA); Fire From The Gods (US); Unprocessed (DE); Akuma Six (DE)	Sondaschule (DE); Die Kassierer (DE); Don Broco (UK); Toxpack (DE); Schmutzki (DE); The Linda Lindas (US); Boston Manor (UK); Kafvka (DE); Schimmerling (DE)	Boys Noize (DE); Digitalism (DE); Drangsal (DE); 100 gecs (US); Grandson (CA); Skynd (AU); The Faim (AU); Tempt (DE); RedHook (DE)

=== 2023 festival ===
June 2–4. Headliners: Foo Fighters (US), Limp Bizkit (US), Rise Against (US), Kings of Leon (US), K.I.Z (DE), Tenacious D (US), Die Toten Hosen (DE), 5FDP (US), Bring Me the Horizon, Machine Gun Kelly

=== 2024 festival ===
June 7–9.

Headliners: Die Ärzte (DE), Avenged Sevenfold (US), QOTSA (US), Green Day (US), Broilers, Billy Talent, Måneskin (IT), Parkway Drive, Kraftklub (DE)

=== 2025 festival ===
The festival was celebrating its 30 years anniversary.

- June 6–8.
- 90.000 guests
- 102 bands
- 4 stages - Utopia, Mandora, Orbit & Atmos

The weather was mostly cloudy and there were several heavy showers and strong winds.

Headliners: Korn (US), Slipknot (US), Bring Me The Horizon, Sleep Token (UK), The Prodigy (UK), Kontra K (DE), Rise Against (US), SDP (DE), Spiritbox (CA), Beatsteaks (DE) and Biffy Clyro (UK)

Special Guests: Electric Callboy (DE), Roy Bianco & Die Abbrunzati Boys (DE), Knocked Loose (US)

Utopia Stage
Friday	Saturday	Sunday
Bring Me the Horizon (UK); Biffy Clyro (UK); A Day to Remember (US); Weezer (US); Knocked Loose (US); Roy Bianco & Die Abbrunzati Boys (DE); Electric Callboy (DE)	Slipknot (US); Kontra K (DE); Bullet for My Valentine (UK); Spiritbox (CA); Skillet (US); NOTHING MORE	Korn (US); Falling in Reverse (US); Beatsteaks (DE); IDLES (UK); The Warning (MX); Dead Poet Society (US)

Mandora Stage
Friday	Saturday	Sunday
K.I.Z (DE); Feine Sahne Fischfilet (DE); Frank Turner (UK); Poppy (US); Myles Kennedy (US); Frog Leap (NO); House of Protection (US)	SDP (DE); Rise Against (US); In Flames (SE); Heaven Shall Burn (Cancelled) (DE); Airbourne (AU); Kraftklub (performing in the crowd area) (DE); Me First and the Gimme Gimmes (US); Imminence (SE); Kittie (CA)	Sleep Token (UK); Powerwolf (DE); Lorna Shore (US); The Ghost Inside (US); Jinjer (UA); Jerry Cantrell (US); Polaris (AU); Fit for an Autopsy (US)

Orbit Stage
Friday	Saturday	Sunday
Electric Bassboy; Tocotronic (DE); Olli Schulz (DE); The Prodigy (UK); Adam Angst (DE); Destroy Boys (US); Drangsal (DE); SOFT PLAY (UK); Mia Morgan (DE); Die Nerven (DE); Christin Nichols (DE)	Millencolin (SE); Smash Into Pieces (SE); Seven Hours After Violet (US); Northlane (AU); Future Palace (DE); Evil Jared x Krogi (US-DE); Holy Wars; Defects; Still Talk	Brutalismus 3000 (DE); Stray From the Path (US); Terror (US) thrown Whitechapel (US); Deafheaven (US); VOWWS (US); Amira Elfeky (US); I See Stars (US); Zetra

Atmos Stage
Friday	Saturday	Sunday
Boston Manor (UK); Creeper (UK); Fleshwater (US); Nasty; Static Dress (UK); FJØRT; LØLØ (CA); Survive Said The Prophet (JP); Tulpe unpeople	Touché Amoré (US); Turbostaat (DE); Zebrahead (US); SiM (band) (JP); Superheaven (US); Trophy Eyes (AU); Grade 2 (UK); Spiritual Cramp (US); Teen Mortgage (US); Kris Barras Band (UK)	Kasalla (DE); ZSK (DE); Deine Cousine (DE); Massendefekt (DE); AViVA; Drug Church (US); Pain of Truth (US); Leftovers; The Red Flags

== Gallery ==
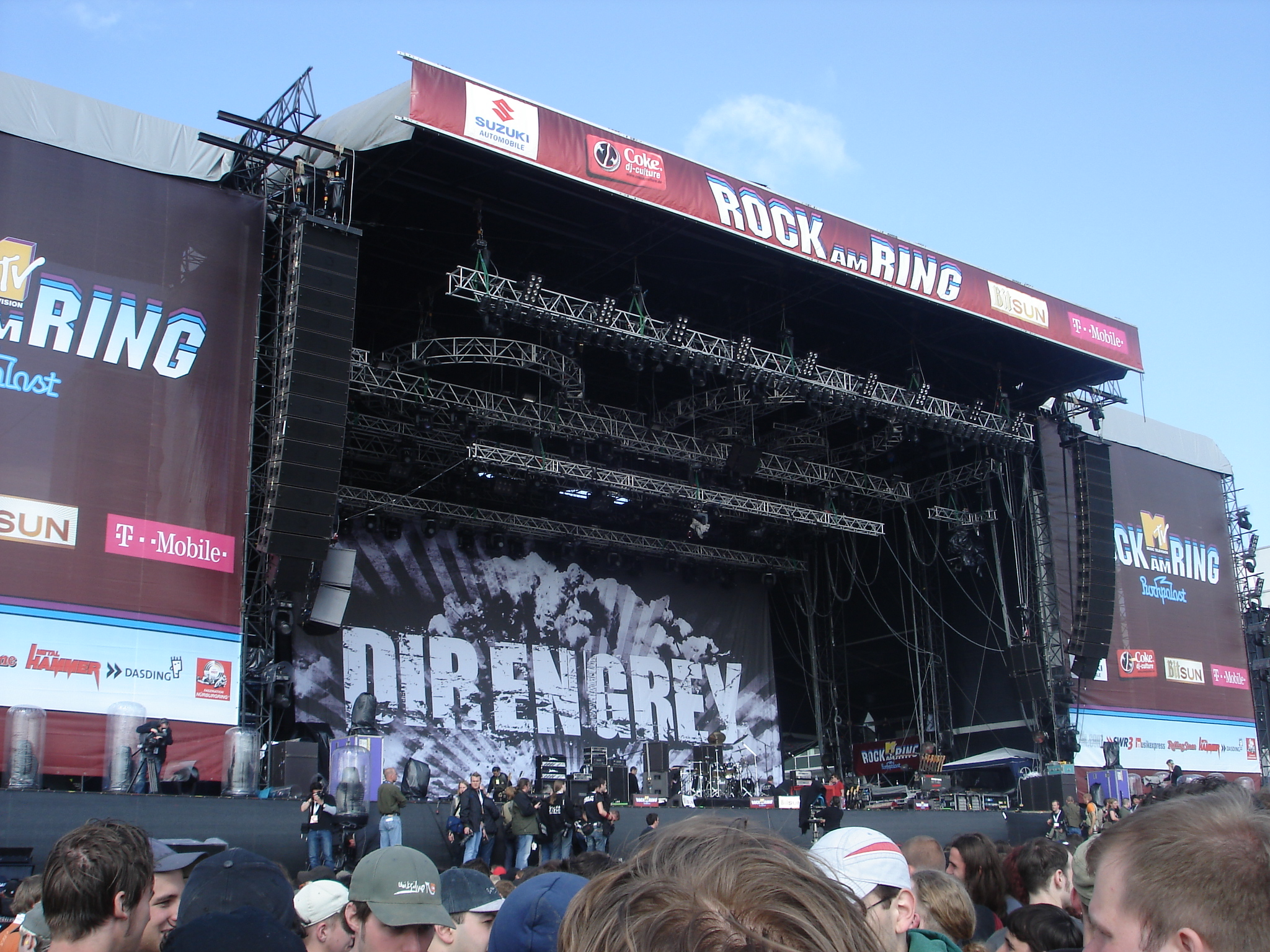
Rock am Ring 2006 stage, Dir en grey shown

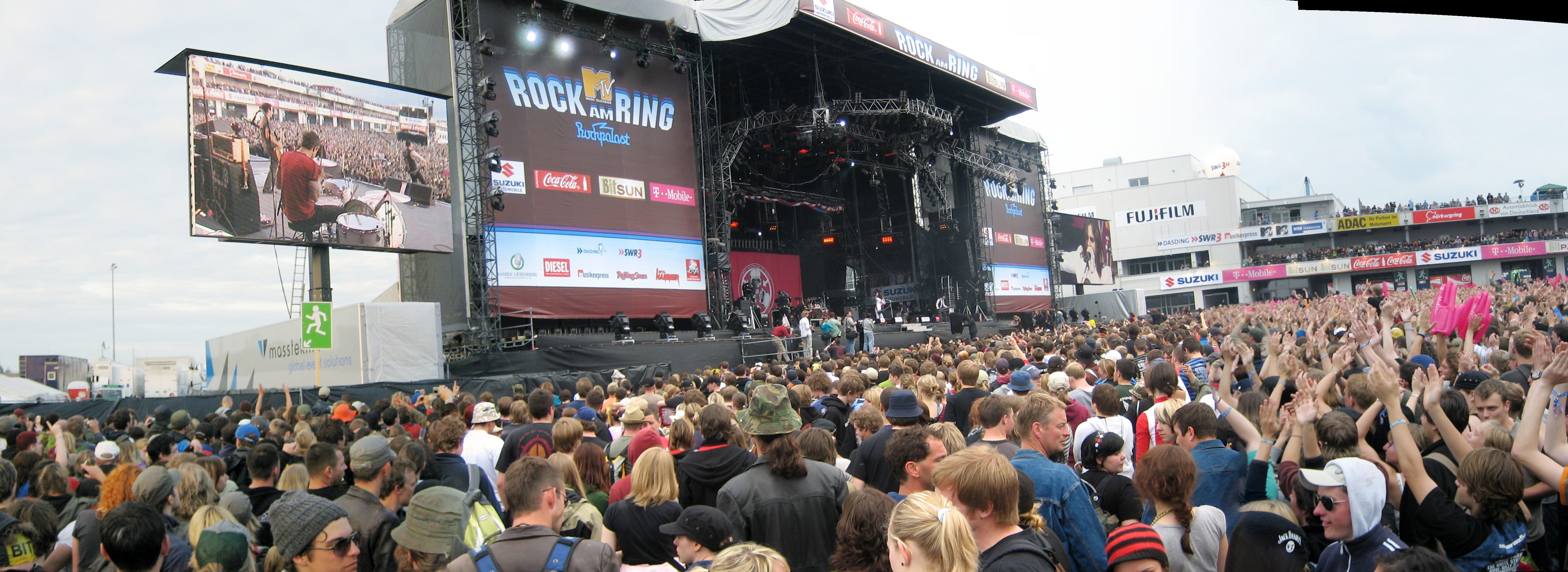
Rock am Ring 2007 main stage, 30 Seconds to Mars

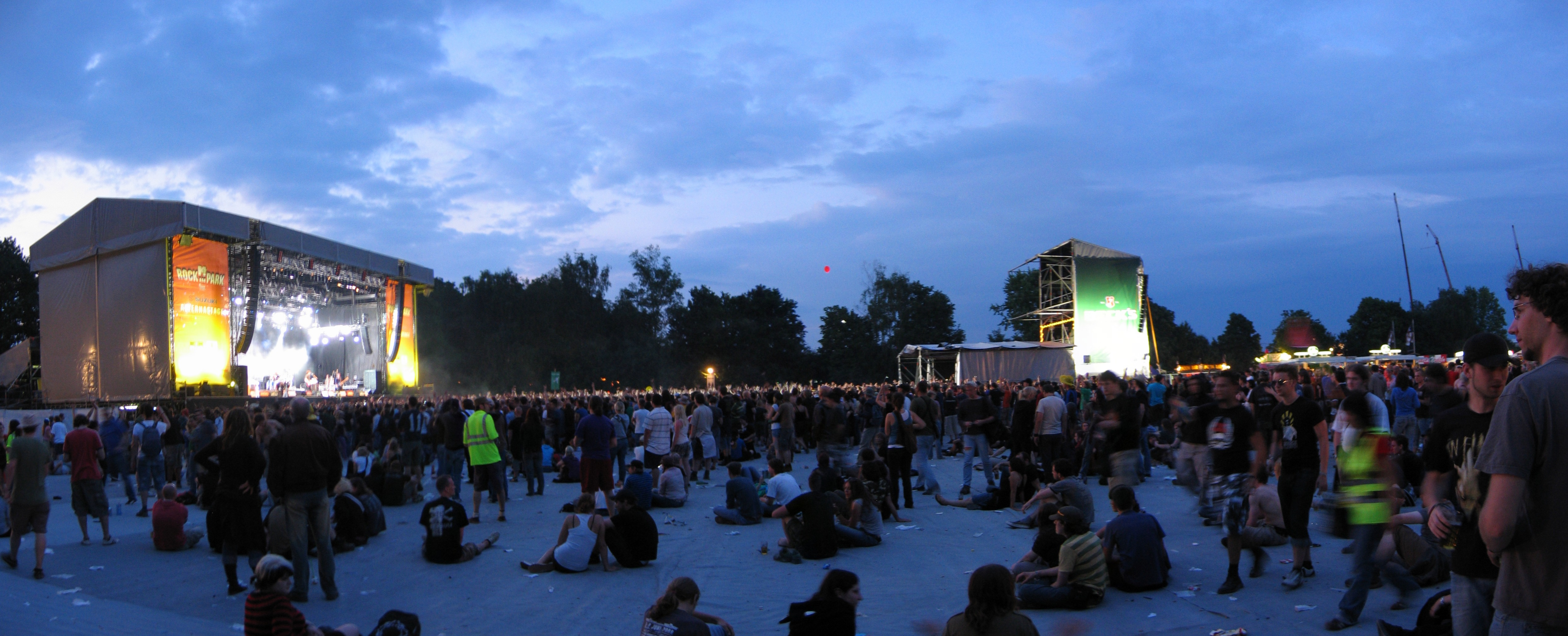
Panorama from the Alternative Stage in Rock Im Park 2008 festival

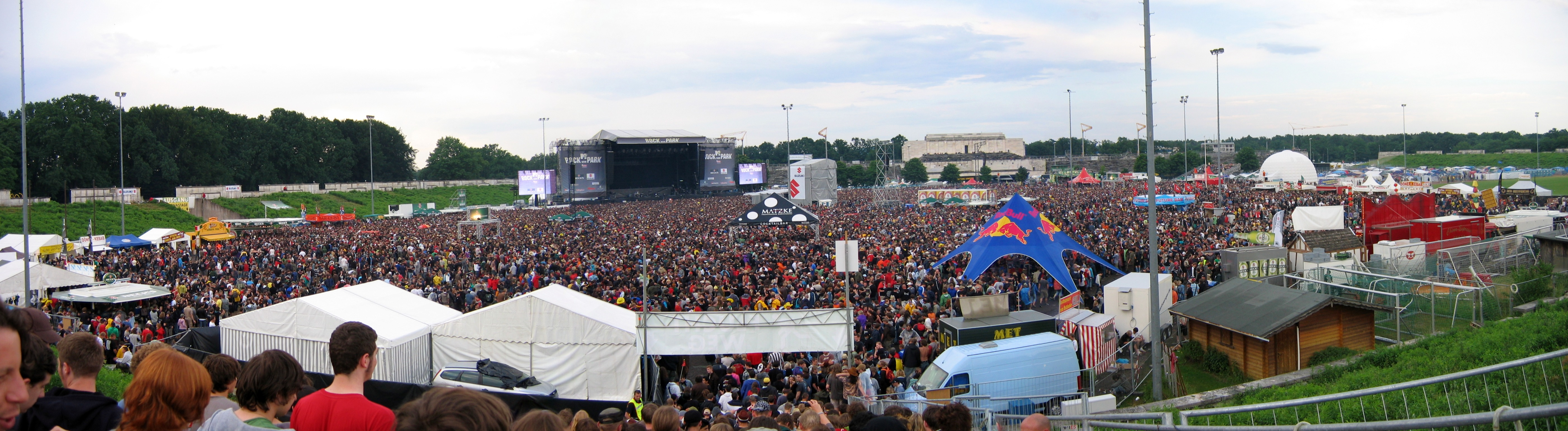
Panorama from the Zeppelin Field Main Stage during the Rock Im Park 2008 event

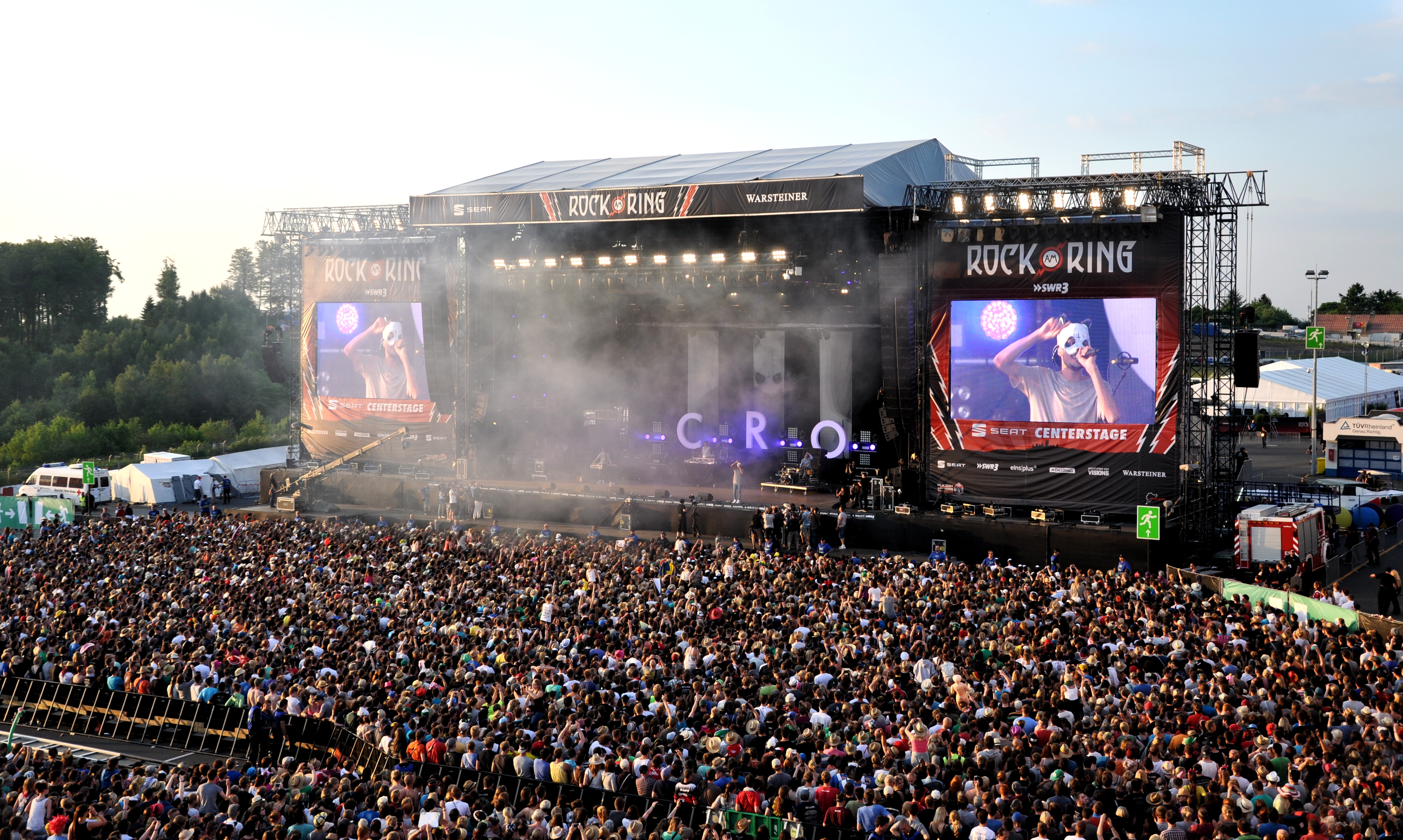
Rock am Ring 2013

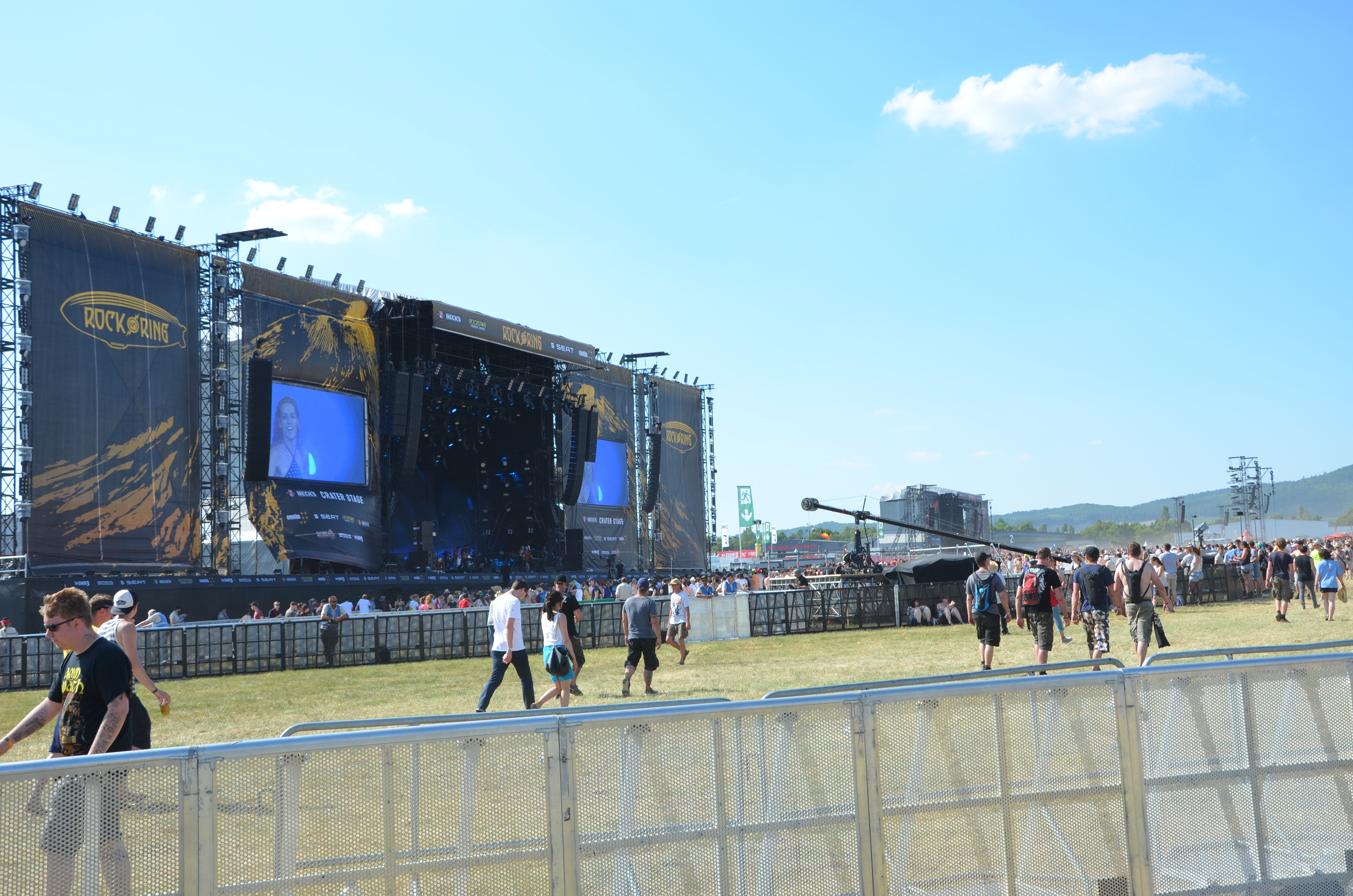
Rock am Ring 2015

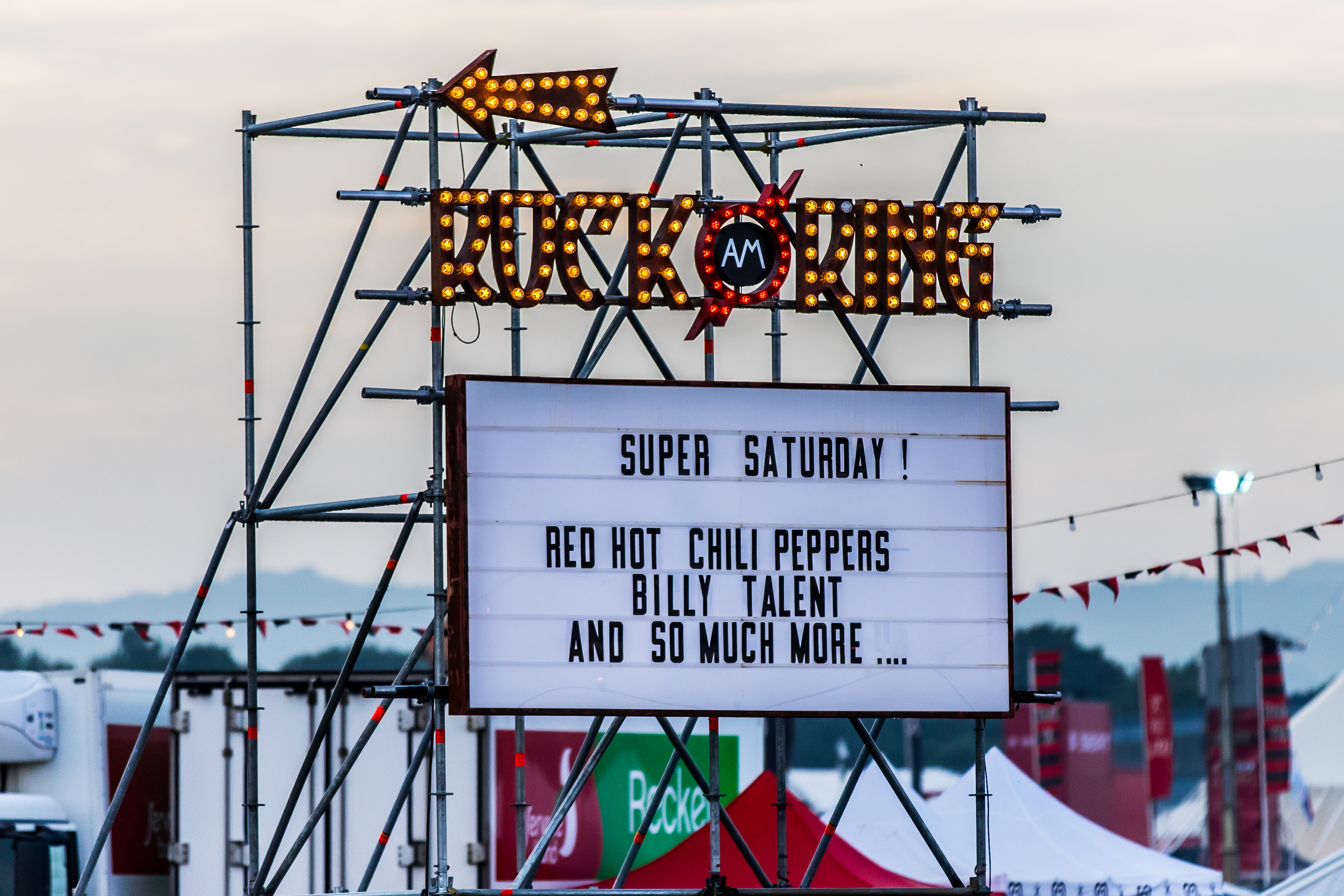
Rock am Ring 2016

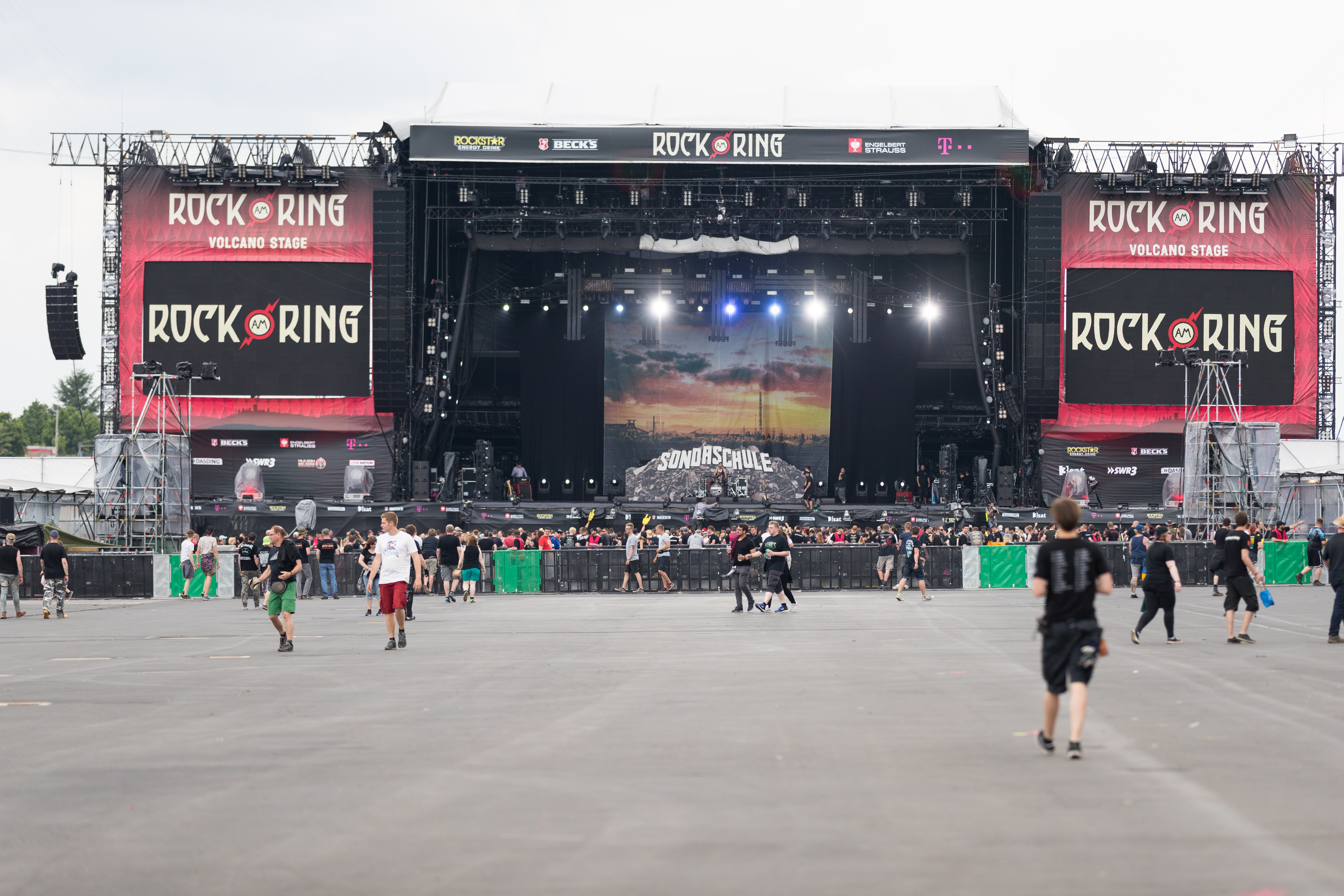
Rock am Ring 2017

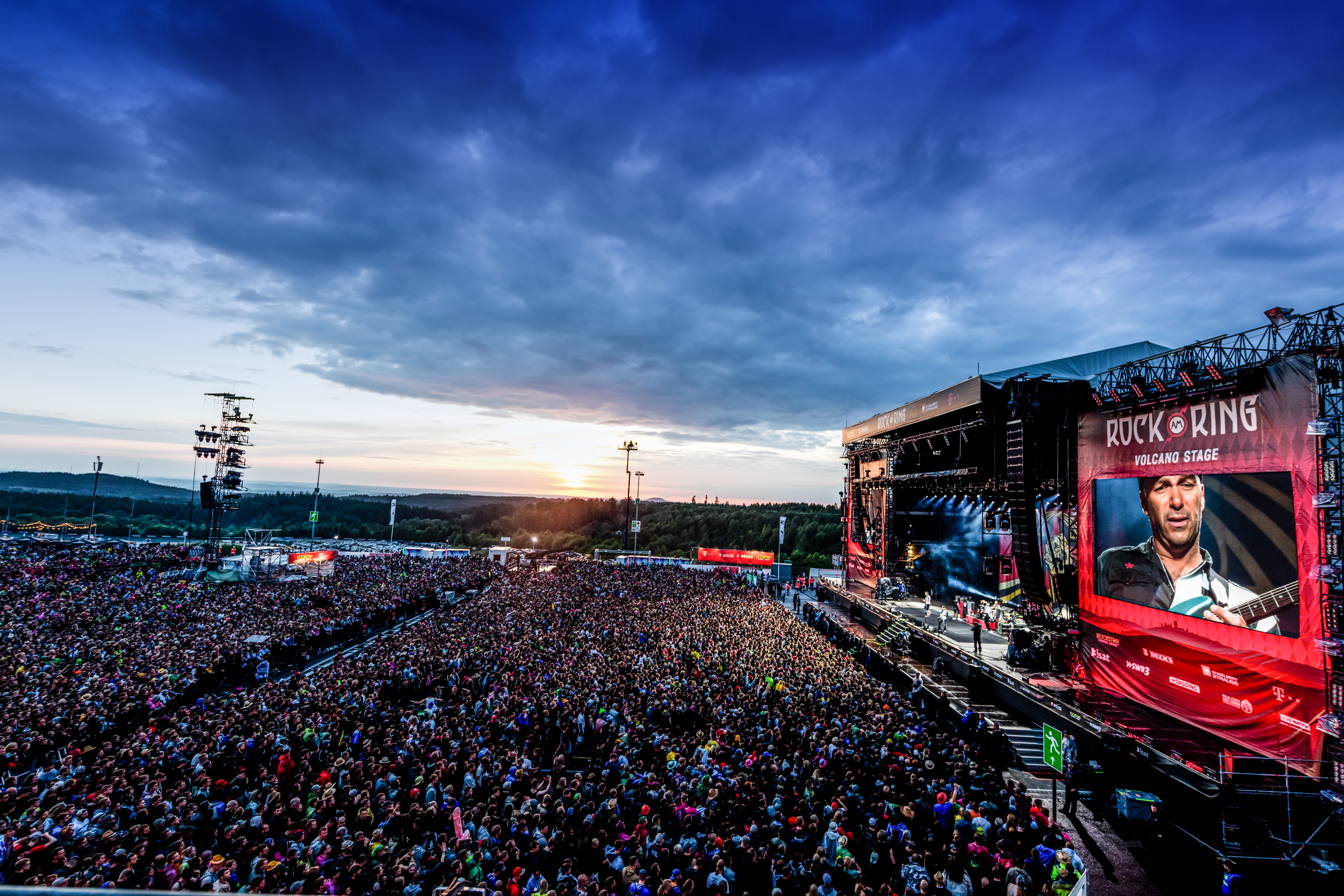
Rock am Ring 2017

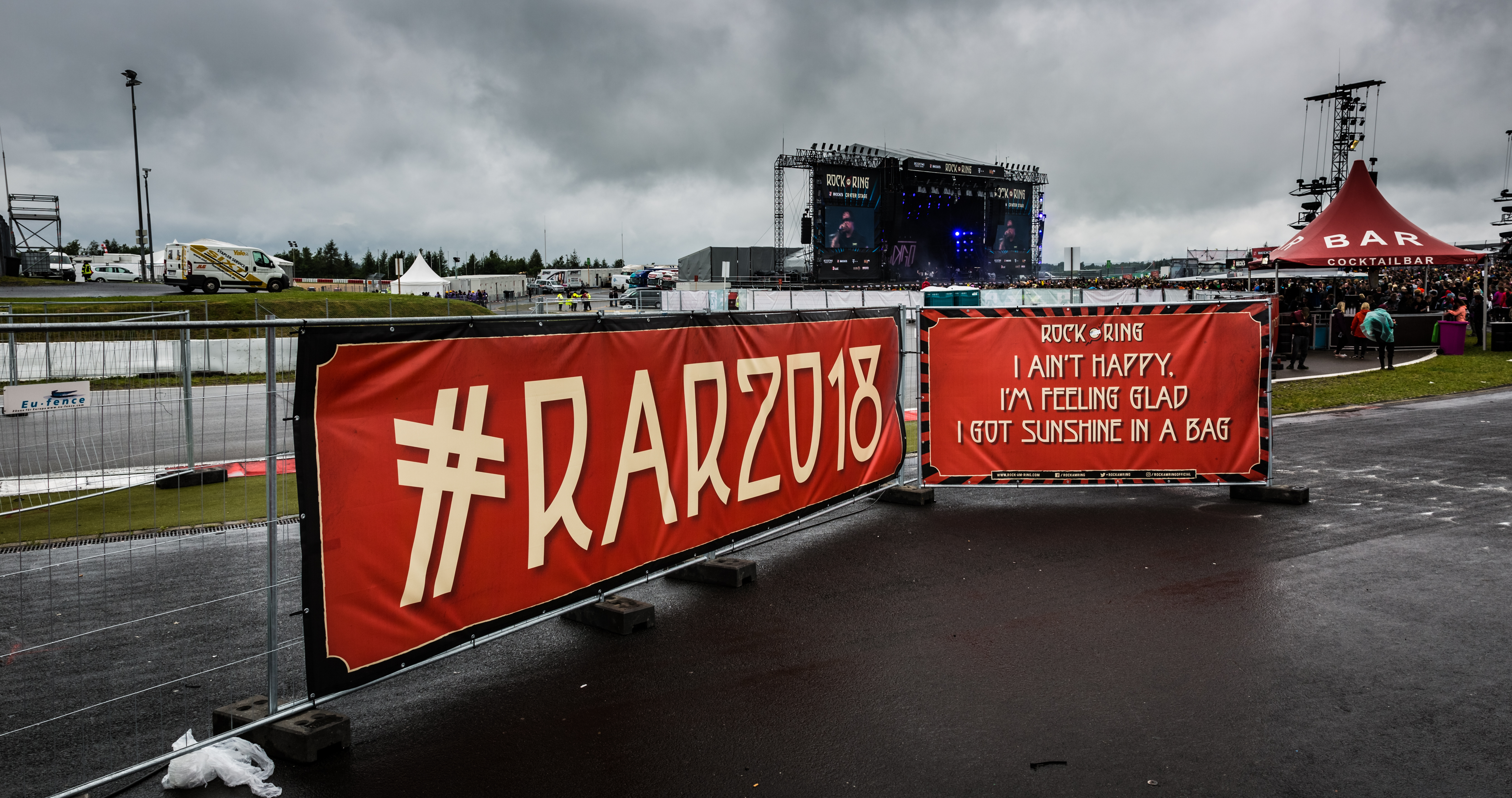
Rock am Ring 2018

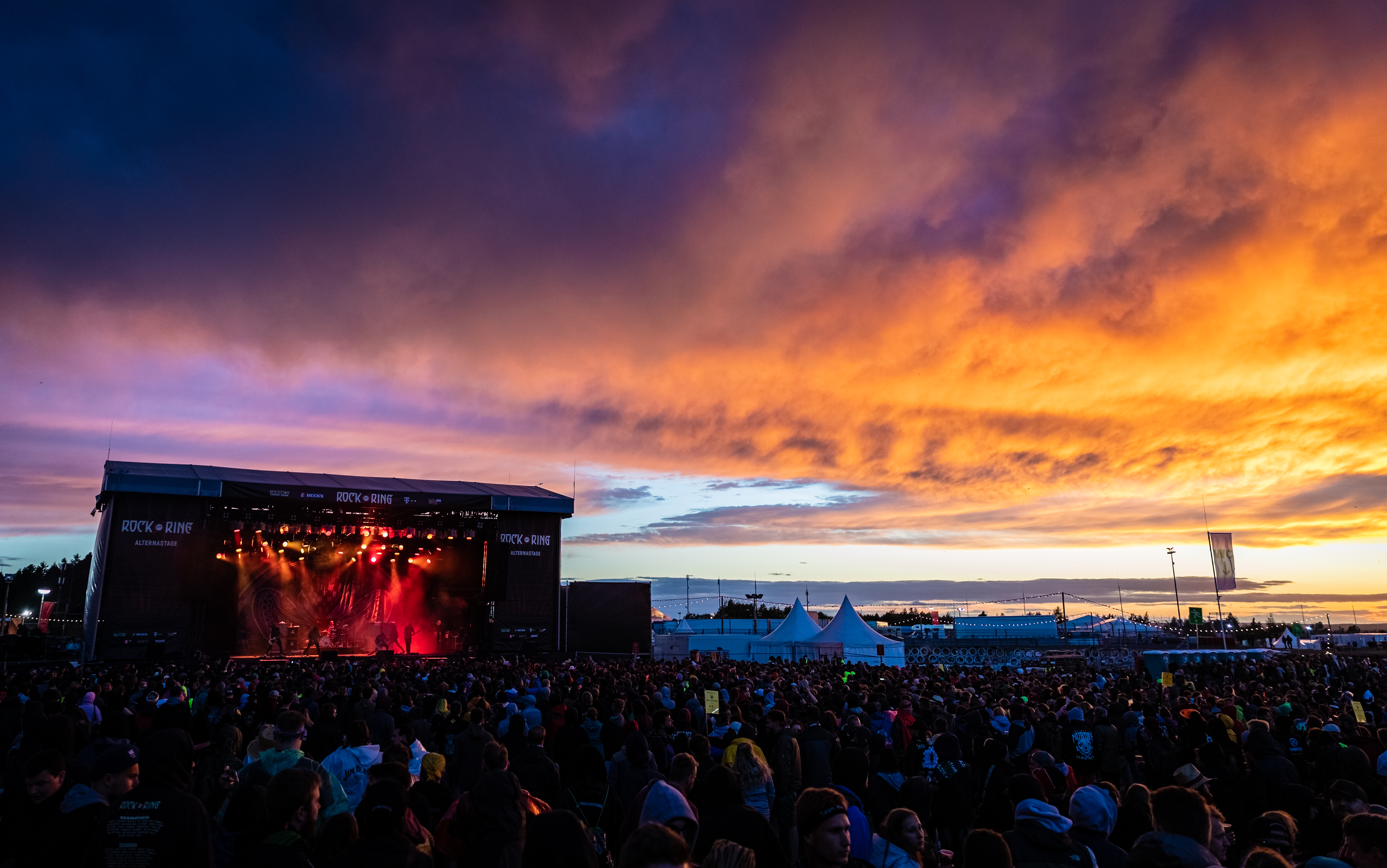
Rock am Ring 2019

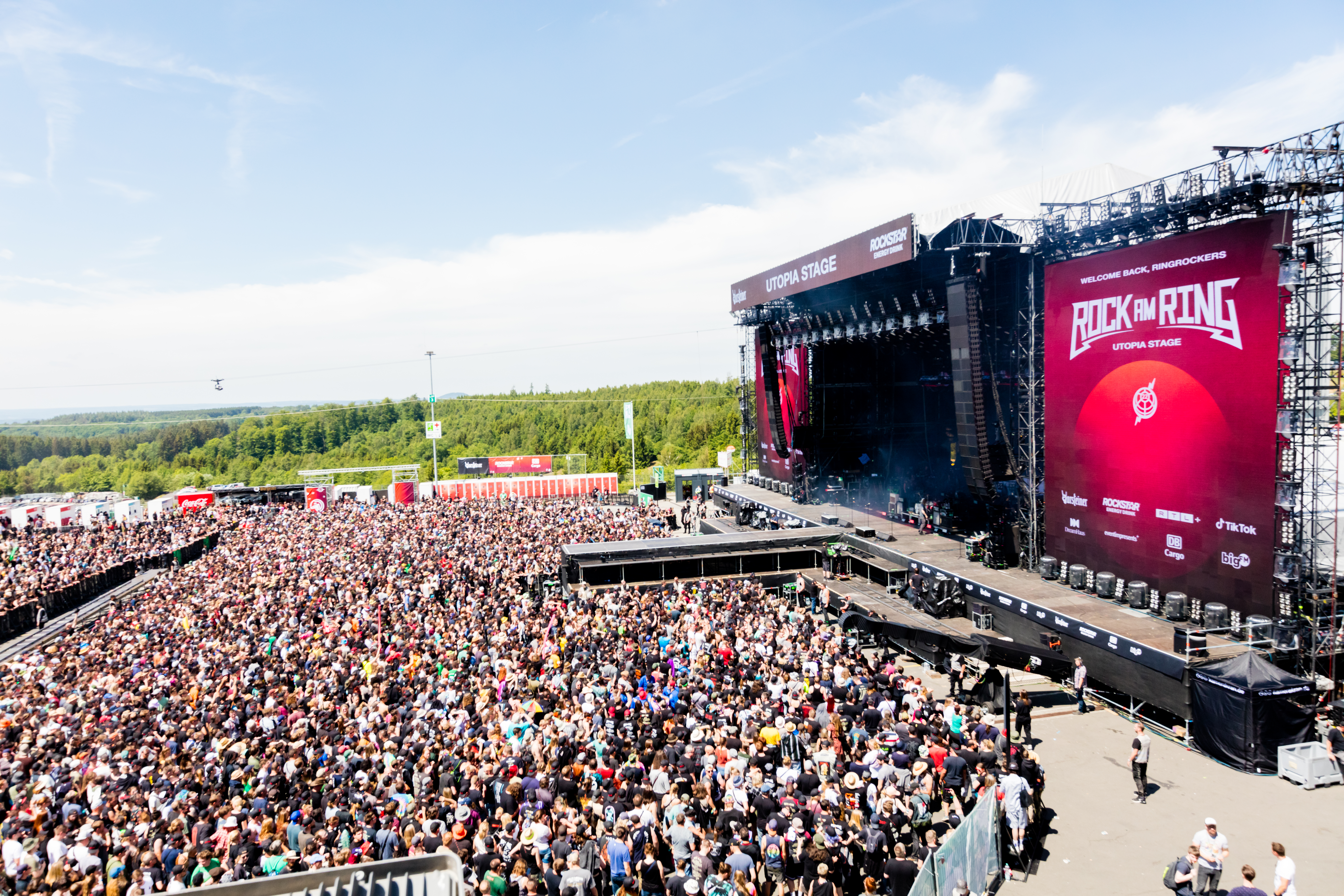
Rock am Ring 2022
