= Keith O'Conner Murphy =

American songwriter

Keith O’Conner Murphy
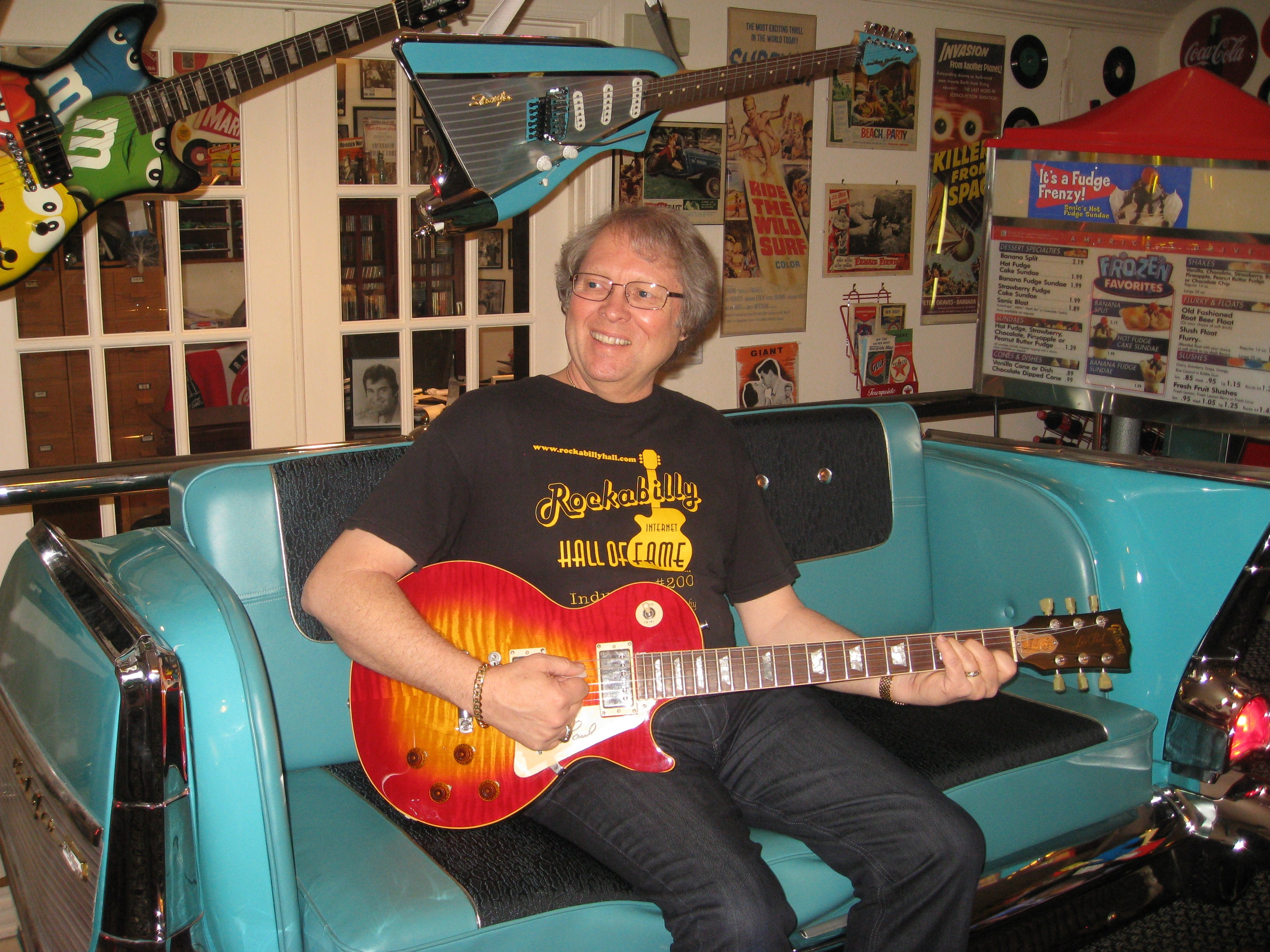
- Keith with guitar, 2013

Background information
- Born: Keith Edward Murphy; November 9, 1944 (age 81); Peru, Indiana, United States
- Genres: Rockabilly, rock and roll, country rock
- Occupation: Singer-songwriter
- Instruments: Vocals, guitar, tambourine, harmonica
- Years active: 1961–present
- Labels: King, Polydor (UK), Stacy

Keith O'Conner Murphy (Keith Murphy) is an American songwriter, singer and recording artist. His contributions to the rockabilly genre of rock and roll music were recognized in 2002 when he was inducted into the Rockabilly Hall of Fame. He is a voting member of the Recording Academy, the organization which awards the Grammys, and a voting member of the CMA Country Music Association.

== Early life ==
Keith Edward Murphy was born on November 9, 1944, in the small town of Peru, Indiana, (also birthplace of Cole Porter) to Edward William and Vivian Marcella (Martin) Murphy. He and his brother Brent, 20 years younger, were the only two children in the family. At the time of his birth, his father was serving in the US Army Air Corps in World War II.

As a child, Murphy loved music, and sang in church and school choirs. His primary family musical influence was his grandmother, Dora Collins Martin, who played piano professionally in local clubs, mostly honky tonk and popular music. His father, Ed, sometimes played harmonica for his own enjoyment, and his mother, Marcella, sang in school and church.

Murphy's formative years were spent in the Indiana towns of Peru, Wabash and Sweetser, all in adjoining counties. He graduated from Oak Hill High School, Marion College (now Indiana Wesleyan University) and Indiana University, where he earned an MBA.

When Murphy was in the 4th grade, his family moved to Wabash, Indiana. His first instrument was an Arthur Godfrey plastic ukulele with a plastic box on the fretboard that allowed a chord to be played by pushing one button. Murphy took it off and figured out which strings to push to play his own chords. When he was in junior high at Chippewa school in 1958, he saved his newspaper money and bought a $25 tangerine-and-white Harmony Caribbean H-1005 flat top from the local music store. It had a strip of aluminum cabinet trim to divide the colors on the front and the strings were not the easiest to press down, but it was a start.

When he was a sophomore, the family moved to Sweetser in Grant County, close to the larger city of Marion, where his father worked at the local Fisher Body plant. He began to take guitar lessons at Butler's music store from an old vaudeville performer, Art Oliver, and later Sy Cantrell, a local barber by trade. Murphy started playing rhythm guitar and was lead singer in a rock and roll band he helped form, and later used his guitar for song writing.

== Music career ==
Two of his earliest influences were Ritchie Valens and Buddy Holly. His first band was The Torkays, formed after he answered a newspaper ad placed by Jim Aguilar, looking for a guitarist, and met with him at Venable's café in Sweetser, Indiana on Monday, January 30, 1961. Aguilar had a 1960 Gibson Les Paul Standard cherry sunburst guitar. Murphy bought an identical one from Aguilar's former guitarist, serial number 0-1485, and these guitars years later were valued at around $250,000 each. Their first paying gig was Saturday, April 22, 1961, at the Van Buren, Indiana Conservation Club. They were hired by Bill Rock Sr. for $25 each to play at a party to celebrate the 15th birthday of his sister, Brenda Rock, who Murphy married six years later.

Aguilar and Murphy wanted to be recording artists, so they wrote some songs, recorded them on a small home tape recorder with one microphone, and took the demo tape around to several record companies. Their first trip was to Nashville and Memphis where they auditioned the songs with such companies as Decca, and the famous Sun Records, without success.

Next they drove to Chicago toward the end of 1962, where they scored a contract with Stacy Records, after John Dolan heard their teen age tragedy song "Little Loved One". The song describes a marriage and a car accident on the way home from the honeymoon, in which the bride dies. Stacy Records was a small but well-funded label owned by Gaylord Products, who made Gayla hair accessories and advertised on American Bandstand. Their biggest artist was Al Casey, who had records on the charts and was a member of Duane Eddy and Lee Hazlewood groups.

Since band members Murphy and Aguilar's brother Frank were underage, John Dolan came down from Chicago by train to Murphy's home. The parents met and signed contracts on January 17, 1963. There were several musicians who came into and out of the Torkays, but the three constant core members and who were on the record were Keith (O’Conner) Murphy on lead vocals and rhythm guitar, and the brothers Jim Aguilar on lead guitar and vocals, and Frank Aguilar on vocals. The four Stacy songs were recorded in a three-hour session in the Sam Phillips studio in Nashville, from 2:00 pm to 5:00 pm on Saturday, February 23, 1963. The other musicians on the record were the Nashville pros they called the "A" team:

- Cliff Parman – arranger and conductor, with many credits including Roy Orbison, Connie Francis, Bobby Vinton; wrote "Pretend"
- Gordon Stoker – background vocalist; the leader of the Jordanaires who backed Elvis on record and in films for many years
- Kelso Herston – guitar, bass and banjo; on numerous records including Jerry Lee Lewis; was musical director for the hit TV show Hee Haw
- Jerry Kennedy – guitar; four-time Grammy winner; CMA Hall of Fame producer and record executive. He played the guitar licks on such classics as "Pretty Woman", "Harper Valley PTA", and "Stand By Your Man", and was on Bob Dylan's Blonde On Blonde album as well as Elvis and Ringo records
- Hargus Pig Robbins – organ and piano; two-time CMA instrumentalist of the year and Hall of Fame member; his credits include nearly every country music star, as well as Bob Dylan, Paul Anka, John Denver, Ray Charles, Jerry Lee Lewis, and Neil Young, with whom he toured
- Willie Ackerman – drums; played on many Nashville recordings including with Willie Nelson, George Jones, and The Monkees; was the Hee Haw TV drummer
- Priscilla Ann Hubbard – background vocalist; was on many records including with Waylon Jennings, Willie Nelson, Jerry Lee Lewis and Elvis Presley
- Margie Singleton – background vocalist and Murphy's duet partner on "I Don’t Like It"; had solo hit records and duets with George Jones and Faron Young

The first two songs released on Stacy were "Little Loved One", which originally landed the band's contract, and "Cindy Lou!" (Stacy 958). These were released in early March 1963. The company decided to release the first record under Murphy's name and not the Torkays. For reasons never explained, they changed his name to "Keith O'Conner".

The central US east of the Mississippi and the northeast was playing "Little Loved One". In April 1963 the song was in the top 10 on the WABY Albany, New York list, and number 16 on the WISH hit list in Indianapolis. Murphy appeared on TV in several Indiana cities. Meanwhile, the South was playing "Cindy Lou". Aguilar and Murphy went on a promotional tour to New Orleans where "Cindy Lou" was listed as "best of the new releases", and made an appearance on regional TV with The Champs, who played "Tequila" and "Limbo Rock". Columbia Records took notice and offered to buy the contract from Stacy for around $20,000, but Stacy declined, sensing a hit and not needing the money.

In 2002 Murphy was inductee number 200 into the Rockabilly Hall of Fame on the strength of "Cindy Lou", which is collected worldwide and is considered one of the final original era of rockabilly songs issued before the British Invasion. Jim and Frank Aguilar were also recognized by the Rockabilly Hall of Fame for their contributions to the recordings.

The next two sides were "Karate" and "I Don't Like It" (Stacy 960) by The torkays, released in late April 1963. Stacy thought both records would be hits, and they wanted to own two acts. To make sure no one caught on that these were the same performers, they changed the songwriter credits on the Torkays' record to Angus (Aguilar) and O'Neil (Murphy). "Karate" was a novelty rocker and marked the first time in the US that a vocal had used martial arts as a theme.

After playing from 1961 through 1963, the Torkays amicably disbanded. Murphy did some work at Jan Hutchens' Tigre Records studio in Indianapolis for the next few years, and gave guidance to local Grant County groups. Murphy's next band was The Daze. The lineup never changed from 1965 to 1968, and consisted of the following members:

- Keith (O'Conner) Murphy, lead vocals, rhythm guitar, tambourine
- John Asher, lead guitar, harmonica and backup vocals
- Jerry Asher (John's younger brother), bass guitar
- Phil Fosnough, organ and backup vocals
- Bill Shearer, drums

The Daze played at many venues throughout Indiana and surrounding states, and was one of the more popular groups in the area. They often performed in the greater Detroit area, including at the Roostertail, as their manager Ray Skop lived there.

In 1967 they landed a contract with the iconic King Records based in Cincinnati, which was known mostly for rhythm and blues acts such as James Brown, Hank Ballard, Bill Doggett, Wynonie Harris, and Little Willie John. In May 1968 they recorded two of Murphy's songs, which were released on the King label September 19, 1968 (King 45–6171). The songs were "Slightly Reminiscent of Her" and its flip side, "Dirty Ol' Sam". The band members were the only musicians on the record.

Around this time period the owner of King Records, Syd Nathan, died March 2, 1968, and promotion efforts were in chaos. This was likely one of the last records released that Nathan approved. It was one of the last 50 or so that was released by King, before the label was purchased by Starday in October 1968, and the records noted "Distributed by Starday-King Records". King historian Chris Richardson noted "Keith Murphy & the Daze would help King Records expand its popular reach into the emerging “psychedelic" rock market May 1968 would find the recording of King's first "psych" 45 with "Slightly Reminiscent of Her", perhaps the only Psychedelic release. The single's recording, however, would take place against the backdrop of (1) label founder Syd Nathan's passing two months prior in March, (2) followed, in April, by civil unrest in the neighborhoods adjacent to Cincinnati's Evanston neighborhood – King's home base – when Martin Luther King Jr. was assassinated in Memphis". The King Records headquarters and studio were designated in 2009 with a marker as the second Rock and Roll Hall of Fame historical landmark site.

The record later became a valuable record to collectors, priced up to $1,000 in record books. Again, as in the case of Stacy Records, King decided to release it with Murphy headlining as "Keith Murphy and The Daze". In England Polydor Records released the recordings (Polydor 56542) with a slightly longer end on "Slightly Reminiscent of Her" and designated the "A" side as "Dirty Ol' Sam".

The band was together from about 1965 through 1968. The Vietnam War was heating up and Murphy enrolled in the local Marion College, now called Indiana Wesleyan University. He later received an MBA from Indiana University. In later years (1999) he wrote and recorded the theme song for a television series Outdoor USA. In 2008 he wrote the song "Tiddlywink" featured on the Rock in Threes! album by the noted German rockabilly group Black Raven. At least three of Murphy's recordings have been re-released on US and European compilation albums. In June 2012 he recorded and released a CD and digital album, The Class of 1962, as "Keith O'Conner Murphy", for his Oak Hill High School 50th class reunion. The album included a new song by the same name, which he wrote and sang, and which was reviewed by the Recording Academy for a Grammy nomination in 2013 in the Americana category. The album also included his original 1960s songs. In June 2017, Keith recorded "Tiddlywink", the song he had written for Germany's Black Raven and replaced their version with his own in a reissued "The Class of 1962". It was reviewed by the Recording Academy for a Grammy nomination in 2018 in the Best Rock Performance category. In April 2018, Black Raven again featured one of Keith's songs from the 60's "Karate!" on their album in CD, Vinyl, and even Cassette tape, titled Rockbox Revival. Black Raven was Kris Kristofferson's band for his European tour, and along with Keith, provided one of the few non-band songs on the album.

== Personal life ==
Murphy married Brenda Rock, the girl whose 15th birthday party was his first paying gig. After living in Northern New Jersey for 35 years, they returned to their native Grant County, Indiana in 2021. They have two daughters, Michelle and Monica. He is Top Pop at his marketing research firm Lollipop Research Company.

== Discography ==
=== Singles ===
- 1963 (US) "Little Loved One/Cindy Lou!", Keith O'Conner, Stacy 958
- 1963 (US) "Karate/I Don't Like It", The Torkays with Keith O'Conner, Stacy 960
- 1968 (US) "Slightly Reminiscent of Her/Dirty Ol' Sam", Keith Murphy and The Daze, King Records 6171
- 1968 (England) "Dirty Ol' Sam/Slightly Reminiscent of Her", Keith Murphy and The Daze, Polydor 56542

The British version of "Dirty Ol' Sam" had a slightly longer ending than the US version.

=== Original albums ===
- 2008 (Germany) CD and Vinyl "Rock In Threes!" by Black Raven, Part Records CD 673-001 and LP 373–002

The song "Tiddlywink" written, but not sung by Keith Murphy is featured on this album

- 2012 (US) CD "The Class of 1962", Keith O'Conner Murphy, "Tiddlywink performed by Black Raven, King Label #45-6171
- 2017 (US) CD "The Class of 1962" Reissued, Keith O'Conner Murphy, "Tiddlywink" performed by Keith O'Conner Murphy, Roundtuit Label No. 3
- 2018 (Germany) CD, Vinyl, Cassette "Rockbox Revival" includes "Karate!" written by Keith Murphy and Jim Aguilar, performed by Black Raven, Hot Stuff Records HSL −026

=== Compilation albums ===
- 1998 (US) CD and vinyl Chop Suey Rock Vol. 2, Hot and Sour Records LP and CD HS-002

The song "Karate" by The Torkays with Keith O'Conner is featured on this album.

- 2004 (US) CD Teen Town USA Vol. 5 Yeaah! Records Y-505

The song "Cindy Lou!" by Keith O'Conner is featured on this album.

- 2007 (England) CD The Electric Coffee House, Psychic Circle Records PCCD 7011

The song "Slightly Reminiscent of Her" by Keith Murphy and The Daze is featured on this album.

=== Television music ===
- 2000 (US) Theme song "Outdoor USA", written and performed by Keith O'Conner Murphy for nationally syndicated program Bill Rock's Outdoor USA on outdoor and sportsman channels
- 2013 (US) Interview: Bongo Boy Rock n' Roll TV Show Episode 1016 first aired 2013
