= Willie Ackerman =

American drummer (1939–2012)

- c. 1958

Background information
- Born: May 1, 1939; Nashville, Tennessee, United States
- Died: December 13, 2012 (aged 73)
- Genres: Country, rock, jazz
- Occupation: Drummer
- Years active: 1957-2000s
- Labels: RCA Studios

Willie Ackerman (May 1, 1939 – December 13, 2012) was a professional American drummer whose career began in 1957 and ended in the 2000s. He performed with Johnny Cash, Louis Armstrong, Willie Nelson, Waylon Jennings, The Monkees, Keith O'Conner Murphy and many other acts. Ackerman was an RCA Studios artist.

Ackerman was born in Nashville, Tennessee. He became a Hee Haw drummer, and was also at one time a drummer at the Grand Ole Opry. He recorded Marty Robbins' "El Paso" song in 1959, "Wings of a Dove" in 1960 and "The Grand Tour" in 1974 along with George Jones. He died in his sleep at his home and left behind his wife Jeannie Ackerman and son Trey Ackerman.

== Personal life ==
Ackerman was a close friend of Faron Young. His son, Trey Ackerman is a country musician. He was 73 when he died.
