= Bilderbuch =

Austrian rock band

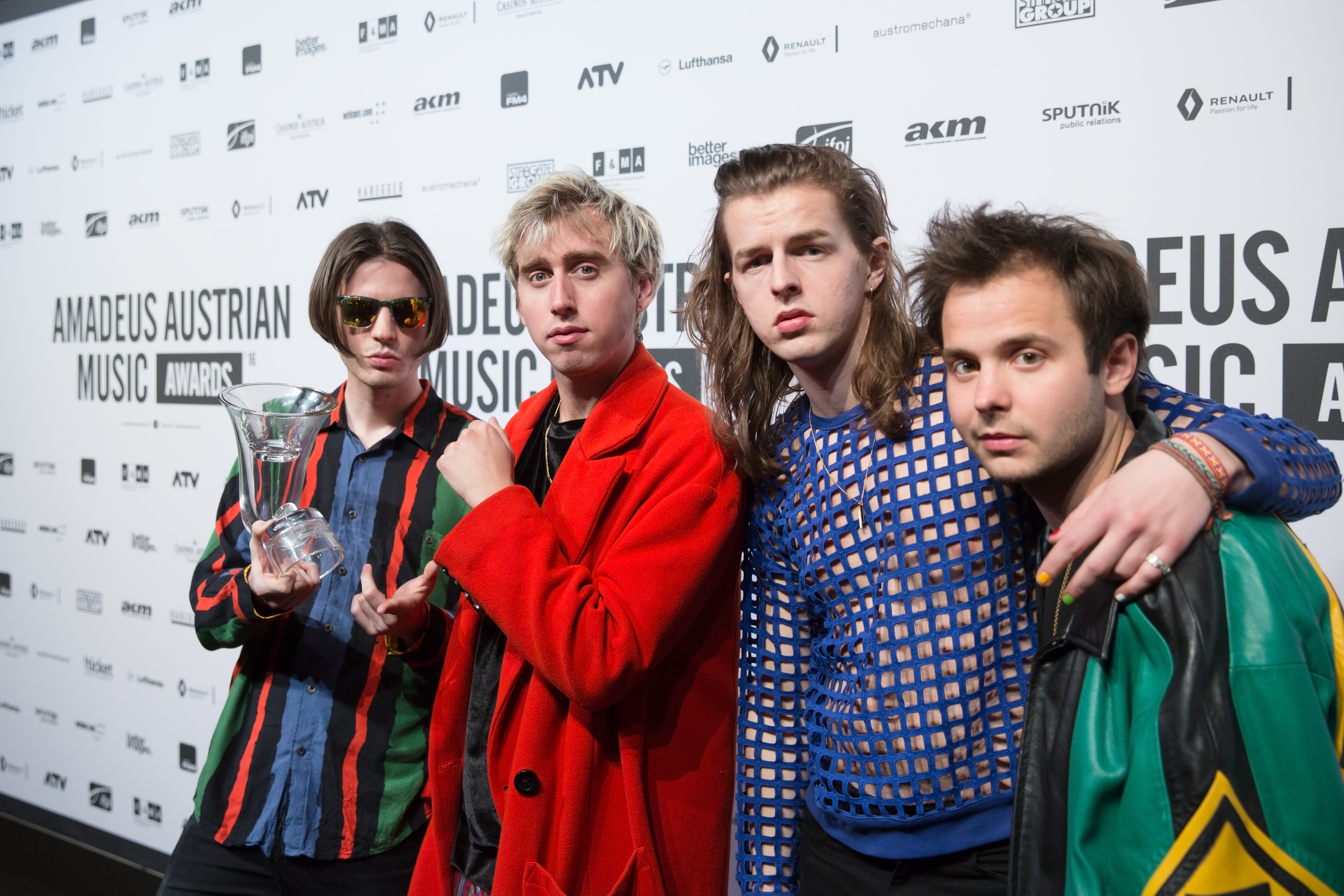
- Bilderbuch in 2014

Background information
- Origin: Kremsmünster, Austria
- Genres: Art pop; indie rock; art punk; alternative R&B; indie pop; hip hop; dance-punk
- Years active: 2005–present
- Label: Maschin Records
- Members: Maurice Ernst; Peter Horazdovsky; Philipp Scheibl; Uche Yara (Liveband); Lukas König (Liveband)
- Past members: Klemens Kranawetter; Andreas Födinger; Michael Krammer
- Website: www.bilderbuch-musik.at

Bilderbuch (English: "Picture Book") is an Austrian rock band and was formed in Kremsmünster, Austria in 2005 but has been based in Vienna since 2008. The current band members are Maurice Ernst (vocals, guitar), Peter Horazdovsky (bass), Michael Krammer (guitar) and Philipp Scheibl (drums). The band has released 7 albums as of 2022. The band began with indie rock, but over the years increasingly adopted elements of hip hop, electronic music and various pop styles.

The band's song "Spliff" was featured in the 2016 Gore Verbinski film A Cure for Wellness.

At the end of 2021 they toured the USA for the first time.

In 2026, Michael Krammer (guitar) announced that he will be leaving the band.

== Discography ==
=== Albums ===
- Nelken & Schillinge (2009)
- Die Pest im Piemont (2011)
- Schick Schock (2015)
- Magic Life (2017)
- Mea Culpa (2018)
- Vernissage My Heart (2019)
- Gelb ist das Feld (2022)
- ∞+1 (2026)

=== EPs ===
- Bitte, Herr Märtyrer (2010)
- Feinste Seide (2013)
- Mr. Refrigerator (2019)
- Softpower (2023)

=== Singles ===
- 2009: Calypso
- 2010: Kopf ab
- 2010: Bitte, Herr Märtyrer
- 2011: Karibische Träume
- 2011: Die Kirschen waren toll
- 2012: Ein Boot für uns
- 2013: Plansch
- 2013: Maschin
- 2014: Feinste Seide
- 2014: Spliff
- 2014: OM
- 2015: Willkommen im Dschungel
- 2015: Softdrink
- 2016: Sweetlove
- 2016: I <3 Stress
- 2016: Erzähl Deinen Mädels Ich Bin Wieder In Der Stadt
- 2017: Bungalow
- 2017: Baba
- 2018: eine nacht in manila
- 2018: Checkpoint (Nie Game Over)
- 2018: Sandwishes
- 2019: LED go
- 2019: Europa 22
- 2019: Frisbeee
- 2019: Mr. Refrigerator
- 2019: Kitsch
- 2021: Nahuel Huapi / Daydrinking
- 2021: Zwischen deiner und meiner Welt
- 2022: Schwarzes Karma / Ab und Auf
- 2022: I‘m Not Gonna Lie
- 2022: Baby, dass du es weißt
- 2023: Softpower
- 2023: Bluezone
- 2026: Irgendwo
- 2026: Push Reality
- 2026: Zahlen als Beweis
- 2026: Baby Junkie

== Awards and nominations ==
=== Berlin Music Video Awards ===
The Berlin Music Video Awards is an international festival that promotes the art of music videos.

Year	Nominated work	Award	Result	Ref.
2026	"Irgendwo"	Most Bizarre	Nominated	

== See also ==
- List of Austrians in music
