= Black Raven (band) =

German band

- Origin: Düsseldorf, Germany
- Genres: Rock and roll
- Years active: 1992–present
- Label: Various
- Members: Julian Wiethoff (since 1992); Jens Feldhaus (since 2012); Bojan Lutz (since 2014)
- Past members: Zlatko Tudja (1992 - 2001); Andy Tudja (1992 - 2003); Jan Ferres (2003–2007); Marcus Lazzari (2007–2011); Torsten Leyhausen (1992-2014)
- Website: www.blackraven.de

Black Raven is a German band formed in 1992 by Julian Wiethoff (vocals, guitar), Zlatko Tudja (vocals, guitar), Andy Tudja (percussion), and Torsten Leyhausen (bass guitar). They made their debut performance in Neuss in 1993.

It is regarded as the first internationally successful so-called Teddy boy / revival-rock'n'roll band from Germany. In 1995, they had their first international performances in England, the mother-country of the rock'n'roll revival movement of the late 1970s and early 1980s. Notable at this time were their gigs at the Teddy Boy Weekender in Great Yarmouth and at the Blackpool Rock’n’Roll-Weekender.

Black Raven has appeared as a backing group for Graham Fenton of Matchbox, Sandy Ford of the Flying Saucers and to Freddie 'Fingers' Lee.

A highpoint of their German career was the 2004 Jägermeister Rockliga – a competition in which eighteen bands took part. Black Raven received third place and, as a result, was invited to perform in the 2005 Rock am Ring alongside Iron Maiden, Green Day, R.E.M., Mötley Crüe, Sonic Youth, The Hives, Slayer, Marilyn Manson, Mando Diao and Die Toten Hosen, a contemporary band from Düsseldorf.

The band has been seen increasingly in other European countries particularly in Scandinavia and has appeared in 23 countries outside Germany including Japan, Russia and the USA.

== Collaboration with Kris Kristofferson ==
In 2013, American country singer, songwriter, and actor Kris Kristofferson produced and released an album by the then-current Black Raven lineup under the project name Rocket to Stardom on his label, KK Records. The debut album, A Rockin' Tribute To Kris Kristofferson, features 16 rockabilly covers of Kristofferson's songs. Kristofferson not only supported the project but also contributed vocals to two tracks, "Under The Gun" and "I Hate Your Ugly Face." Additionally, Kristofferson's daughter, Kelly, made her recording debut on the track "Between Heaven And Here."

== Discography ==
- Rock’n’Roll (EP, 1994)
- Raven's Break Up (LP, 1995)
- Fool's Paradise (EP, 1998)
- No Way To Stop Me - I'm On Rock’n’Roll (LP/CD, 2001)
- She's A Rocket (EP, 2004)
- Rock In Threes! (LP/CD, 2008)
- A Rockin' Tribute To Kris Kristofferson (CD, 2013)
- Rockbox Revival (LP/CD, 2018)
