= Selig (band) =

German band

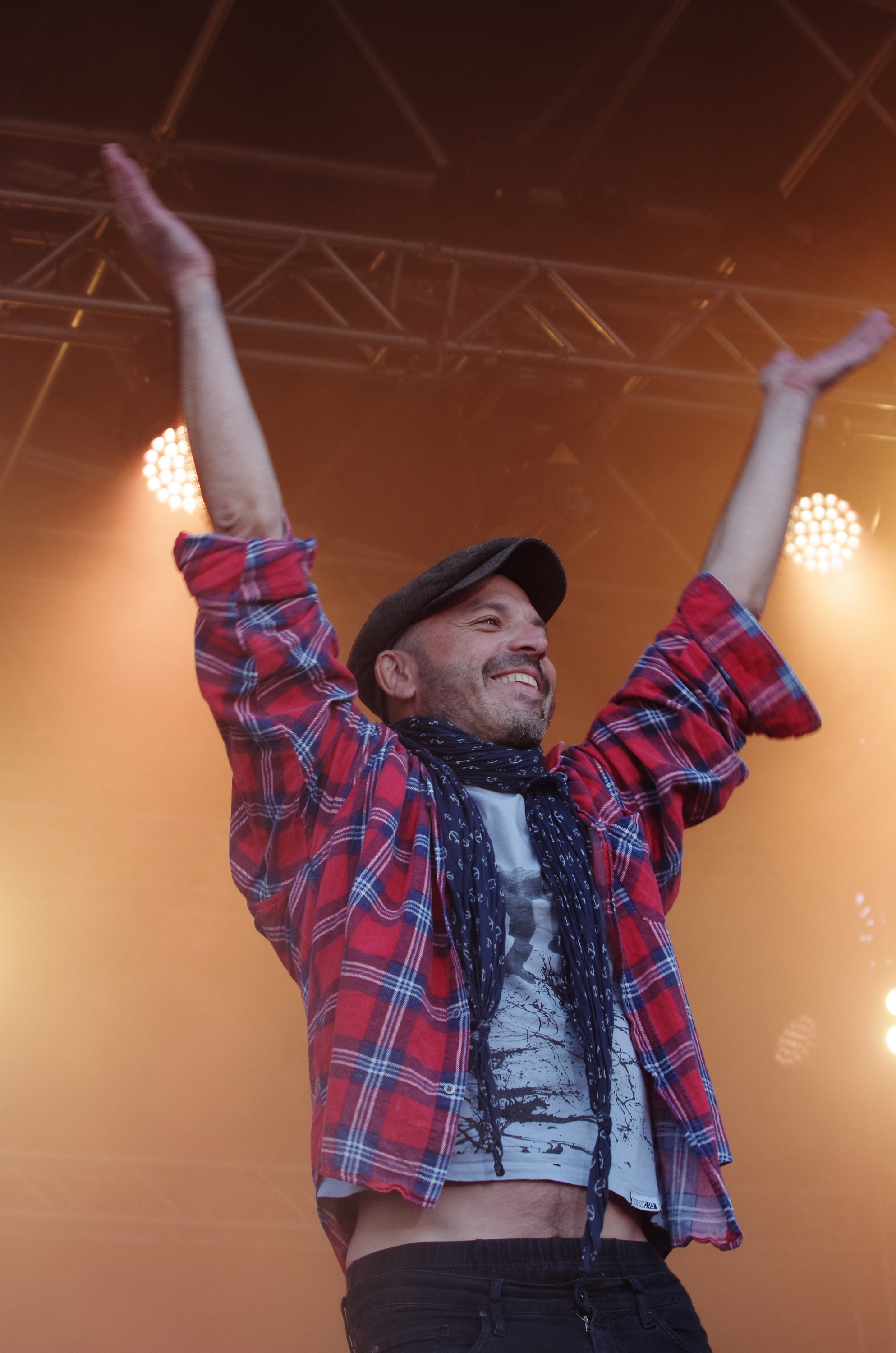
- Jan Plewka of Selig at Jübek Open Air 2013

Background information
- Origin: Hamburg, Germany
- Genres: German rock Grunge
- Years active: 1992–1999; 2008-present
- Labels: Epic, Sony BMG
- Members: Jan Plewka; Leo Schmidthals; Christian Neander; Stephan Eggert
- Past members: Malte Neumann
- Website: selig.eu

Selig ("Blessed") is a German rock band from Hamburg, which was most famous in the 1990s for a mixture of experimental 1970s rock and grunge.

== Members ==
Selig currently comprises Jan Plewka on vocals, Leo Schmidthals on bass, Christian Neander on guitar, Stephan "Stoppel" Eggert on drums, and Malte Neumann on keyboard.

== Formation and End ==
Selig was formed in 1992 in Hamburg. The band initially had Jan Plewka writing the lyrics, and Christian Neander writing the music. They released their self-titled debut album in 1994, which peaked at the 35th place in the Top 40 on the German album charts. In 1995, they released their second album, Hier, and received an Echo Music Prize in February 1995. In May 1995, the band embarked on a nearly sold out headliner tour and also appeared in several rock festivals. In 1997, the band released Blender, which was recorded in New York City. The 5 band members separated after Knockin' on Heaven's Door was finished recording. In January 1999, the band announced its dissolution, and released their Greatest Hits album in December 1999.

== Comeback ==
In August 2008, the band announced their comeback, and released their first single, Schau Schau, in March 2009.

== Discography ==
=== Studio albums ===
Year	Title	Peak chart positions
1994	Selig	35
1995	Hier (Here)	15
1997	Blender (Phoney)	15
2009	Und Endlich Unendlich (And finally infinite)	5
2010	Von Ewigkeit zu Ewigkeit (From Eternity To Eternity)	9
2013	Magma	4
2017	Kashmir Karma	19
2021	Myriaden (Myriads)	8
"—" denotes a recording that failed to chart.

=== Compilation albums ===
Year	Title	Peak chart positions
1999	Für immer und Selig (greatest hits double album)	—
2014	Die Besten (1994-2014) (compilation including newly recorded songs)	27
"—" denotes a recording that failed to chart.

=== Film Score ===
- 1997: Knockin' on Heaven's Door (OST)

=== Singles ===
Year	Title	Peak chart positions			Album
Year	Title	GER	AUT	SWI	Album
1994	"Sie hat geschrien" ("She Screamed")	—	—	—	Selig
1994	"Wenn ich wollte" ("If I Wanted")	—	—	—	Selig
1994	"Ohne Dich" ("Without You")	—	—	—	Selig
1995	"Ist es wichtig?" ("Does It Matter?")	93	—	—	Hier
1995	"Laß mich rein" ("Let Me In")	—	—	—	Hier
1996	"Bruderlos" ("Brotherless")	—	—	—	
1997	"Knockin' On Heaven's Door"	31	—	30	Knockin' on Heaven's Door (OST)
1997	"Popstar"	—	—	—	Blender
1997	"Sie zieht aus" ("She Is Moving Out")	—	—	—	Blender
2009	"Schau schau" ("Look Look")	46	—	—	Und Endlich Unendlich
2009	"Wir werden uns wiedersehen" ("We Will Meet Again")	47	—	—	Und Endlich Unendlich
2009	"Ich fall in Deine Arme" ("I Fall Into Your Arms")	76	—	—	Und Endlich Unendlich
2010	"Von Ewigkeit zu Ewigkeit" ("From Eternity To Eternity")	44	—	—	Von Ewigkeit zu Ewigkeit
2010	"Hey Ho"	—	—	—	Von Ewigkeit zu Ewigkeit
2012	"Alles auf einmal" ("Everything At Once")	58	48	—	Magma
2013	"Ohne dich (2014)"	52	57	74	Die Besten (1994-2014)
"—" denotes a recording that failed to chart or was not released in that territory
