= Los Premios MTV Latinoamérica for Best Alternative Artist =

Latino MTV award

This is a list of the Los Premios MTV Latinoamérica winners and nominees for Best Alternative Artist.

Year	Winner	Other nominees
2002	Manu Chao	Celso Piña; Ely Guerra; Enrique Bunbury; Kinky
2003	Molotov	Café Tacuba; El Otro Yo; Kinky; Plastilina Mosh
2004	Café Tacuba	Cartel de Santa; Control Machete; Kinky; Miranda!
2005	Miranda!	Andrea Echeverri; Belanova; Molotov; Natalia y La Forquetina
2006	Panda	Calle 13; División Minúscula; El Otro Yo; Zoé
2007	Panda	Allison; División Minúscula; Kinky; Zoé
2008	Café Tacuba	Emmanuel Horvilleur; Kinky; Molotov; Zoé
2009	Panda	Austin TV; División Minúscula; Kinky; Plastilina Mosh
