= List of awards and nominations received by Belinda Peregrín =

Belinda Peregrín is a Spanish-born Mexican singer-songwriter, actress, record producer and dancer. Latin Music Italian Awards 2013

== Berlin Music Video Awards ==
Year	Title of Work	Category	Result
2025	"LA MALA"	Best Director	Nominated

== BMI Latin Music Awards ==
Year	Title of Work	Category	Result
2009	Bella Traición	Award Winning Songs	Won

== Billboard Latin Music Awards ==
Year	Title of Work	Category	Result
2004	Belinda	Best Female Pop Album	Nominated

== Billboard Latin Women in Music ==
Year	Title of Work	Category	Result
2025	Belinda	Evolution Award	Won

== BreakTudo Awards ==
Year	Title of Work	Category	Result
2025	"Blink Twice (Remix)" (BINI with Belinda)	International Collaboration of the Year	Won

== Eres Awards ==
Year	Title of Work	Category	Result
2001	Belinda	Best Singer and Actress	Won

== Eres Niños Awards ==
Year	Title of Work	Category	Result
2002	Belinda for Cómplices Al Rescate	The Mega Actress	Nominated
2002	Belinda	The More Toned	Won

== Latin Grammy Awards ==
Year	Title of Work	Category	Result
2002	Cómplices Al Rescate	Best Children's Album	Nominated
2007	"Bella Traición"	Song of the Year	Nominated
2007	Utopía	Best Female Pop Vocal Album	Nominated

== Latin Music and Sports Awards ==
Year	Title of Work	Category	Result
2007	Belinda	Best Artist New Generation of the Year	Won

== La Gente Awards ==
Year	Title of Work	Category	Result
2007	Belinda	Best Artist New Generation of the Year	Won

== Los Premios MTV Latinoamérica ==
Year	Title of Work	Category	Result
2004	Belinda	Best Artist — North	Nominated
2004	Belinda	New Artist — Mexico	Won
2005	Belinda	Best Pop Artist	Nominated
2007	Belinda	Best Solo Artist	Won
2007	Belinda	Best Pop Artist	Nominated
2007	Belinda	Best Artist — North	Nominated
2007	Bella Traición	Video of the Year	Won
2007	Belinda	Fashionista — Female	Nominated
2007	Belinda	Artist of the Year	Nominated

== Lo Nuestro Awards ==
Year	Title of Work	Category	Result
2007	Ni Freud Ni Tu Mamá	Video of the Year	Nominated
2008	Belinda	Female Artist of the Year.	Won
2008	Belinda	Best New Artist	Nominated
2011	"Egoísta"	Video of the Year	Won
2012	"Dopamina"	Video of the Year	Nominated
2020	"Amor a primera vista" (with Los Ángeles Azules)	Regional Mexican Collaboration of the Year	Nominated
2025	Belinda	Female Pop Artist of the Year	Nominated
2025	"Jackpot" (with Kenia Os)	Best Female Combination	Won

== Mi TRL Awards ==
Year	Title of Work	Category	Result
2007	Belinda	Female Of The Year	Nominated
2007	Belinda	You Complete Me Awards	Nominated
2007	Belinda	Should Have DVR'D It Awards	Nominated
2008	Belinda	Best New Artist	Nominated

== Monitor Latino Awards ==
Year	Title of Work	Category	Result
2010	Egoísta feat. Pitbull	Special Collaboration	Nominated

== Nickelodeon - Kids Choice Awards México ==
Year	Title of Work	Category	Result
2010	Belinda for Camaleones	Favorite Female Character Series	Nominated

== Orgullosamente Latino Awards ==
Year	Title of Work	Category	Result
2007	Belinda	Latin Solo of the Year	Nominated
2008	Belinda	Latin Solo of the Year	Nominated

== Oye Awards ==
Year	Title of Work	Category	Result
2002	Cómplices Al Rescate: Mariana	Best Solo Grupero	Nominated
2004	Belinda	Best Female Solo Singer	Nominated
2004	Belinda	Album of the Year	Nominated
2004	Ángel	Video of the Year	Nominated
2005	Muriendo Lento	Song of the Year	Nominated
2005	Muriendo Lento	Video of the Year	Nominated
2007	Belinda	Best Female Solo Singer	Won
2007	Belinda	Best Basic 40	Nominated
2012	Gaia	Music Social Award	Nominated

== Palmas de Oro (Mexico) ==
Year	Title of Work	Category	Result
2001	Belinda for Amigos x Siempre	Best Child Actress	Won

== Pantalla de Cristal Awards ==
Year	Title of Work	Category	Result
2003	Lo Siento	Best Edition	Nominated
2005	Muriendo Lento	Best Animation	Nominated
2011	Dopamina	Best Photography	Nominated
2011	Dopamina	Best Art Direction	Nominated

== People en Español Awards ==
Year	Title of Work	Category	Result
2010	Belinda for Camaleones	Best Young Actress	Nominated
2010	Belinda & Alfonso Herrera for Camaleones	Best Couple	Nominated
2010	Carpe Diem	Álbum of the Year	Won
2010	Belinda	Singer or Pop Group	Nominated
2010	Egoísta	Song of the Year	Nominated
2010	Egoísta	Video of the Year	Won
2010	Somos el Mundo	Cover of the Year	Nominated
2011	Dopamina	Video of the Year	Nominated
2012	Belinda	Queen of the Facebook	Nominated
2012	Belinda	Debut of the Year	Won

== Premios Juventud ==
Year	Title of Work	Category	Result
2005	Muriendo Lento (with Moderatto)	Dynamic Duet	Nominated
2007	Belinda	Favorite Rock Artist	Nominated
2008	Belinda	Pop Artist	Nominated
2008	Belinda	Rock Artist	Nominated
2010	Belinda & Giovanni dos Santos	Hottest Romance	Nominated
2010	Somos el Mundo	Perfect Combination	Won
2010	Belinda	The Best Dressed	Won
2011	Belinda for Camaleones	Girl of my Dreams	Nominated
2012	Belinda	The Best Dressed	Won

== Quiero Awards ==
Year	Title of Work	Category	Result
2010	Egoísta	Best Female Video Artist	Nominated
2011	Dopamina	Best Female Video Artist	Nominated

== Shock Awards ==
Year	Title of Work	Category	Result
2011	"Lolita" for Niñas Mal	Best Music in a Movie or TV Series	Nominated

== Telehit Awards ==
Year	Title of Work	Category	Result
2010	Belinda	Young Artist of the Year	Won

== Top Glamour Awards ==
Year	Title of Work	Category	Result
2010	Belinda	Female Singer	Won

== Tu Musica Awards (Puerto Rico) ==
Year	Title of Work	Category	Result
2003	Belinda	Tu Musica Awards	Won

== TVyNovelas Awards ==
Year	Title of Work	Category	Result
2000	Belinda for Amigos x Siempre	Best Female Newcomer	Won
2005	Vivir for Corazones Al Límite	Best Musical Theme	Nominated

== Terra Awards ==
Year	Title of Work	Category	Result
2007	Bella Traición	Best Song of the Year	Won
2007	Belinda	Best Newcomer	Nominated

== Texas Awards ==
Year	Title of Work	Category	Result
2012	Belinda	Best Female Vocalist	Nominated

== 40 Principales Awards ==
Year	Title of Work	Category	Result
2007	Belinda	Best Artist International	Nominated
2008	Belinda	Best Artist International	Nominated
2008	Bella Traición	Best International Song	Nominated
2010	Ay Haití	Best Clip	Won
