= Los Premios MTV Latinoamérica for Best New Artist — South =

Latino MTV award

This is a list of the Los Premios MTV Latinoamérica winners and nominees for Best New Artist — South.

Year	Winner	Other nominees
2002	Bandana	Daniela Herrero; Jorge Drexler; Leo García; Parraleños
2003	Vicentico	Carajo; Emme; Kevin Johansen; Miranda!
2004	Airbag	Callejeros; Capri; Gazpacho; Leticia Brédice
2005	Bahiano	Cuentos Borgeanos; Flavio y La Mandiga; Lourdes; Luciano Supervielle
2006	Axel	Entre Ríos; Flor; Migue García; Nerd Kids
2007	Inmigrantes	Bicicletas; Ella Es Tan Cargosa; Las Pastillas del Abuelo; Pánico Ramírez
2009	Loli Molina	Banda de Turistas; F-A; Onda Vaga; Walter Domínguez
