= Los Premios MTV Latinoamérica for Best Artist — North =

Latino MTV award

This is a list of the Los Premios MTV Latinoamérica winners and nominees for Best Artist — North.

Year	Winner	Other nominees
2002	Shakira	Aleks Syntek; Celia Cruz; Juanes; Paulina Rubio
2003	Molotov	Café Tacuba; Maná; Mœnia; Natalia Lafourcade
2004	Julieta Venegas	Aleks Syntek; Belinda; Café Tacuba; Cartel de Santa
2005	Reik	Belanova; Café Tacuba; Moderatto; Molotov
2006	Belanova	Allison; Julieta Venegas; Maná; Motel
2007	División Minúscula	Belinda; Julieta Venegas; Paulina Rubio; Zoé
2008	Belanova	Café Tacuba; Motel; Ximena Sariñana; Zoé
2009	Panda	Jesse & Joy; Paulina Rubio; Ximena Sariñana; Zoé
