= Los Premios MTV Latinoamérica for Best Group or Duet =

Latino MTV award

This is a list of the Los Premios MTV Latinoamérica winners and nominees for Best Group or Duet.

Year	Winner	Other nominees
2002	La Ley	Babasónicos; Catupecu Machu; Kinky; La Oreja de Van Gogh
2003	Molotov	Café Tacuba; La Ley; La Oreja de Van Gogh; Maná
2004	La Oreja de Van Gogh	Babasónicos; Café Tacuba; Cartel de Santa; La Ley
2005	Reik	Café Tacuba; La Ley; Miranda!; Molotov
2006	Panda	Belanova; La Oreja de Van Gogh; Maná; Miranda!
2007	Maná	Babasónicos; Kudai; Miranda!; Panda
2008	Kudai	Babasónicos; Belanova; Café Tacuba; Miranda!
2009	Panda	Calle 13; Jesse & Joy; Wisin & Yandel; Zoé
