= Los Premios MTV Latinoamérica for Best Solo Artist =

Latino MTV award

This is a list of the Los Premios MTV Latinoamérica winners and nominees for Best Solo Artist.

Year	Winner	Other nominees
2002	Best Male Artist: Juanes	Alejandro Sanz; Diego Torres; Enrique Iglesias; Gustavo Cerati
2002	Best Female Artist: Shakira	Ely Guerra; Érica García; Paulina Rubio; Thalía
2003	Natalia Lafourcade	Diego Torres; Gustavo Cerati; Ricky Martin; Vicentico
2004	Julieta Venegas	Alejandro Sanz; Álex Ubago; Diego Torres; Tiziano Ferro
2005	Best Male Artist: Juanes	Alejandro Sanz; Daddy Yankee; Diego Torres; Tiziano Ferro
2005	Best Female Artist: Shakira	Andrea Echeverri; Belinda; Ely Guerra; Paulina Rubio
2006	Julieta Venegas	Daddy Yankee; Diego Torres; Gustavo Cerati; Tiziano Ferro
2007	Belinda	Alejandro Sanz; Daddy Yankee; Gustavo Cerati; Paulina Rubio
2008	Juanes	Diego; Emmanuel Horvilleur; Gustavo Cerati; Ximena Sariñana
2009	Paulina Rubio	Andrés Calamaro; Beto Cuevas; Daddy Yankee; Ximena Sariñana
