= Los Premios MTV Latinoamérica for Best Pop Artist — International =

Music award category

This is a list of the Los Premios MTV Latinoamérica winners and nominees for Best Pop Artist — International.

Year	Winner	Other nominees
2002	Pink	Avril Lavigne; Britney Spears; Kylie Minogue; Nelly Furtado
2003	Avril Lavigne	Christina Aguilera; Justin Timberlake; Madonna; Robbie Williams
2004	Avril Lavigne	Beyoncé; Hilary Duff; Joss Stone; Nelly Furtado
2005	Gwen Stefani	Ashlee Simpson; Backstreet Boys; Hilary Duff; Kelly Clarkson
2006	Robbie Williams	Ashlee Simpson; Kelly Clarkson; Madonna; Nelly Furtado
2007	Avril Lavigne	Gwen Stefani; Hilary Duff; Justin Timberlake; Rihanna
2008	Jonas Brothers	Amy Winehouse; Fergie; Madonna; Rihanna
2009	Jonas Brothers	Britney Spears; Lady Gaga; Miley Cyrus; Taylor Swift
