= Los Premios MTV Latinoamérica for Artist of the Year =

Latino MTV award

This is a list of the Los Premios MTV Latinoamérica winners and nominees for Artist of the Year.

Year	Winner	Other nominees
2002	(Colombia) Shakira	(Spain) Alejandro Sanz; (Argentina) Diego Torres; (Colombia) Juanes; (Chile) La Ley
2003	(Colombia) Juanes	(Mexico) Café Tacuba; (Chile) La Ley; (Mexico) Maná; (Mexico) Molotov; (Mexico) Natalia Lafourcade
2004	(Mexico) Julieta Venegas	(Spain) Alejandro Sanz; (Mexico) Café Tacuba; (Argentina) Diego Torres; (Spain) La Oreja de Van Gogh
2005	(Colombia) Shakira	(Mexico) Café Tacuba; (Argentina) Diego Torres; (Colombia) Juanes; (Argentina) Miranda!
2006	(Puerto Rico) Daddy Yankee	(Mexico) Belanova; (Argentina) Gustavo Cerati; (Mexico) Julieta Venegas; (Spain) La Oreja de Van Gogh
2007	(Mexico) Maná	(Mexico) Belinda; (Argentina) Babasónicos; (Chile) Kudai; (Spain) Alejandro Sanz
2008	(Colombia) Juanes	(Argentina) Babasónicos; (Mexico) Belanova; (Mexico) Café Tacuba; (Argentina) Miranda!
2009	(Puerto Rico) Wisin & Yandel	(Chile) Kudai; (Mexico) Paulina Rubio; (Mexico) Ximena Sariñana; (Mexico) Zoé
