= Los Premios MTV Latinoamérica for Best New Artist — North =

Latino MTV award

This is a list of the Los Premios MTV Latinoamérica winners and nominees for Best New Artist — North.

Year	Winner	Other nominees
2002	Sin Bandera	Cabas; Celso Piña; Kinky; Volován
2003	Natalia Lafourcade	Cartel de Santa; Inspector; Panteón Rococó; Qbo
2004	Belinda	Kalimba; La 5ª Estación; Lu; María Barracuda
2005	Reik	Delux; Elli Noise; Mariana Ochoa; Thermo
2006	Allison	Chetes; Diego; Motel; Nikki Clan
2007	Camila	Bengala; María José; Masappan; Pambo
2009	Paty Cantú	Hello Seahorse!; Jotdog; Sandoval; Tush
