= Los Premios MTV Latinoamérica for Best Artist — South =

Latino MTV award

This is a list of the Los Premios MTV Latinoamérica winners and nominees for Best Artist — South.

| Year | Winner | Other nominees |
|---|---|---|
| 2002 | Diego Torres | Babasónicos; Bersuit Vergarabat; Catupecu Machu; Gustavo Cerati |
| 2003 | Bersuit Vergarabat | Babasónicos; Gustavo Cerati; Kevin Johansen; Vicentico |
| 2004 | Diego Torres | Babasónicos; Bersuit Vergarabat; Catupecu Machu; Vicentico |
| 2005 | Miranda! | Árbol; Babasónicos; Bersuit Vergarabat; Catupecu Machu |
| 2006 | Gustavo Cerati | Airbag; Árbol; Babasónicos; Diego Torres |
| 2007 | Airbag | Babasónicos; Catupecu Machu; La Vela Puerca; Miranda! |
| 2008 | Miranda! | Andrés Calamaro; Babasónicos; Catupecu Machu; Emmanuel Horvilleur |
| 2009 | Miranda! | Andrés Calamaro; Babasónicos; Infierno 18; Los Fabulosos Cadillacs |
