= Los Premios MTV Latinoamérica for Best Pop Artist =

Latino MTV award

This is a list of the Los Premios MTV Latinoamérica winners and nominees for Best Pop Artist.

Year	Winner	Other nominees
2002	Shakira	Alejandro Sanz; Diego Torres; Enrique Iglesias; Paulina Rubio
2003	Natalia Lafourcade	Diego Torres; Paulina Rubio; Ricky Martin; Thalía
2004	Alejandro Sanz	Álex Ubago; Diego Torres; Julieta Venegas; Paulina Rubio
2005	Shakira	Belinda; Diego Torres; Julieta Venegas; Reik
2006	Kudai	Belanova; Diego Torres; Julieta Venegas; La Oreja de Van Gogh
2007	Julieta Venegas	Alejandro Sanz; Belinda; Miranda!; Paulina Rubio
2008	Kudai	Belanova; Jesse & Joy; Miranda!; Ximena Sariñana
2009	Reik	Fanny Lu; Jesse & Joy; Miranda!; Paulina Rubio
