= Los Premios MTV Latinoamérica for Best Rock Artist — International =

Latino MTV award

This is a list of the Los Premios MTV Latinoamérica winners and nominees for Best Rock Artist — International.

Year	Winner	Other nominees
2002	Red Hot Chili Peppers	Coldplay; Linkin Park; No Doubt; System of a Down
2003	Coldplay	Audioslave; Evanescence; Linkin Park; Radiohead
2004	Maroon 5	Blink 182; Evanescence; No Doubt; The Rasmus
2005	Green Day	Coldplay; Foo Fighters; Good Charlotte; Simple Plan
2006	My Chemical Romance	AFI; Coldplay; Placebo; Red Hot Chili Peppers
2007	Evanescence	Thirty Seconds to Mars; Maroon 5; My Chemical Romance; Panic! at the Disco
2008	Thirty Seconds to Mars	Coldplay; Fall Out Boy; Panic! at the Disco; Paramore
2009	Green Day	Coldplay; Fall Out Boy; Linkin Park; Metallica
