= Premio MTV Latinoamérica for Video of the Year =

Latino MTV award

This is a list of the Los Premios MTV Latinoamérica winners and nominees for Video of the Year.

Year	Winner	Other nominees	Ref(s).
2002	Shakira — "Suerte"	Diego Torres — "Color Esperanza"; Enrique Iglesias — "Héroe"; Juanes — "A Dios le Pido"; Paulina Rubio — "Si Tú Te Vas"	
2003	Molotov — "Frijolero"	Café Tacuba — "EO (El Sonidero)"; Gustavo Cerati — "Cosas Imposibles"; Juanes — "Fotografía (featuring Nelly Furtado)"; La Ley — "Ámate y Sálvate"	
2004	Café Tacuba — "Eres"	Alejandro Sanz — "No Es Lo Mismo"; Babasónicos — "Putita"; Julieta Venegas — "Andar Conmigo"; Molotov — "Hit Me"	
2005	Shakira — "La Tortura (featuring Alejandro Sanz)"	Juanes — "La Camisa Negra"; Miranda! — "Don"; Molotov — "Amateur"; Shakira — "No"	
2006	Maná — "Labios Compartidos"	Calle 13 — "Atrévete-te-te"; Gustavo Cerati — "Crimen"; Julieta Venegas — "Me Voy"; Miranda! — "El Profe"	
2007	Belinda — "Bella Traición"	Alejandro Sanz — "Te Lo Agradezco, Pero No (featuring Shakira)"; Calle 13 — "Tango del Pecado"; Gustavo Cerati — "Adiós"; Maná — "Manda Una Señal"; Panda — "Los Malaventurados No Lloran"	
2008	Belanova — "One, Two, Three, Go! (1, 2, 3, Go!)"	Babasónicos — "Pijamas"; Café Tacuba — "Esta Vez"; Juanes — "Me Enamora"; Motel — "Uno, Dos, Tres"	
2009	Wisin & Yandel — "Abusadora"	Calle 13 — "Electro Movimiento"; Nelly Furtado — "Manos al Aire"; Paulina Rubio — "Causa y Efecto"; Shakira — "Loba"	

== See also ==
- Latin Grammy Award for Best Short Form Music Video
- Lo Nuestro Award for Video of the Year
