= List of awards and nominations received by Paramore =

Paramore awards and nominations
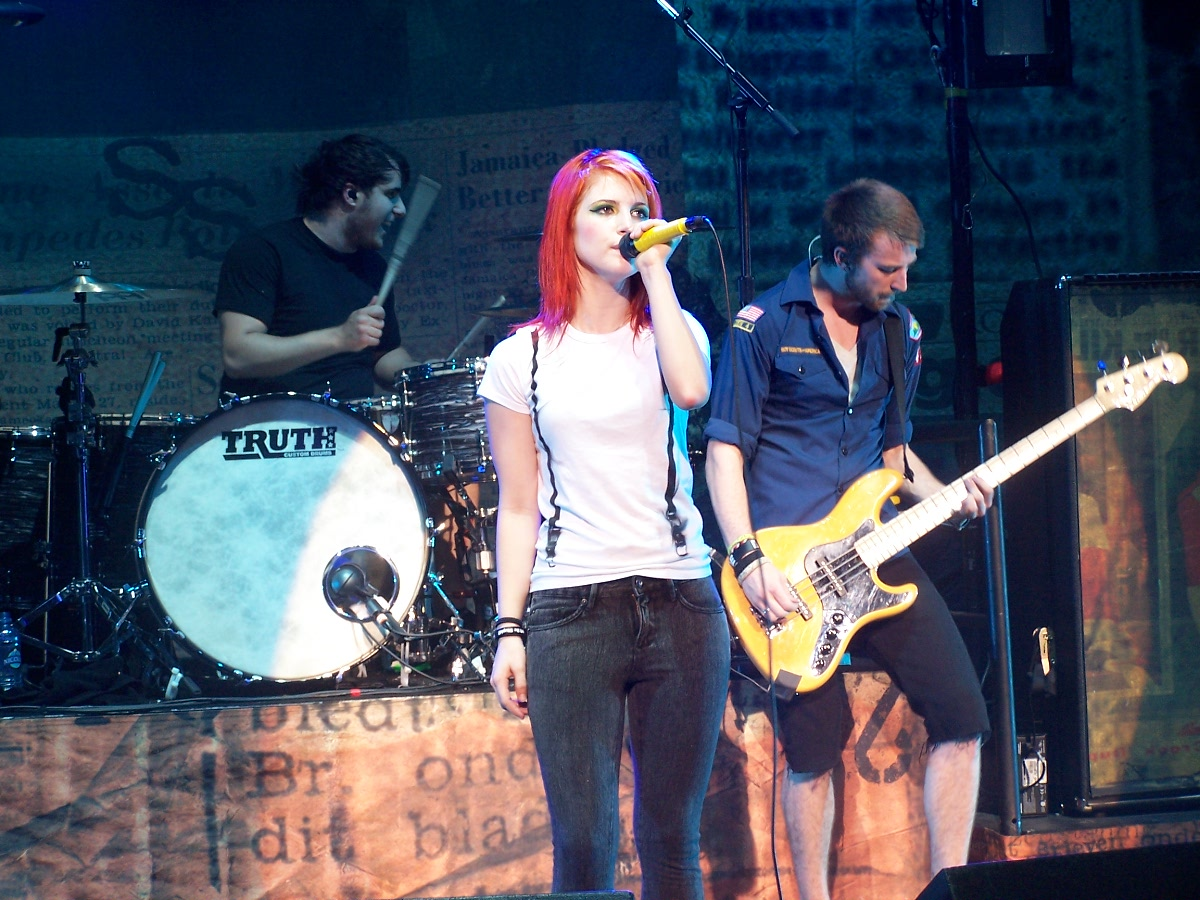
- Paramore opening of the show No Doubt in General Motors Place (2009)
Awards and nominations
Award	Wins	Nominations
American Music Awards	0	1
Billboard	0	1
Brit	0	1
Grammy	3	6
Kerrang!	2	8
Los Premios MTV Latinoamérica	1	3
MTV Australia	0	1
MTV Europe	1	6
MTV VMA	0	4
MTV Brazil	1	2
NME	3	4
MTV Movie & TV Awards	1	1
People's Choice Awards	2	4
Alternative Press Music Awards	0	8
International Dance Music Awards	1	1
Radio Disney Music Awards	1	1
Teen Choice Awards	11	18
Woodie Awards	1	1

Totals (Note: Certain award groups do not simply award one winner. They acknowledge several different recipients, have runners-up, and have third place. Since this is a specific recognition and is different from losing an award, runner-up mentions are considered wins in this award tally. For simplification and to avoid errors, each award in this list has been presumed to have had a prior nomination.)
- Wins: 31
- Nominations: 76

Paramore is an American rock band from Franklin, Tennessee formed in 2004. The band currently consists of Hayley Williams (lead vocals), Taylor York (guitar) and Zac Farro (drums). They have released six studio albums—All We Know Is Falling (2005), Riot! (2007), Brand New Eyes (2009), Paramore (2013), After Laughter (2017) and This Is Why (2023)—with several certifications around the United States, United Kingdom and Australia. The band has released twenty three singles, including: "Misery Business", that became their first charting single in the US Billboard Hot 100, certified single, and in 2015, the band's first to be certified triple-platinum in the United States; "Ignorance", that become the first single to reach the top fifteen in the UK Singles Chart; and "Ain't It Fun", which was the band's first top ten single in the United States.

Paramore has received 31 awards from 76 nominations. They received one nomination on the American Music Award for New Artist of the Year and many other nominations in magazines awards and popular votes ceremonies. Their single "Ain't It Fun" won the first Grammy Award for the band, out of four nominations, in the category Best Rock Song, that was awarded to the composers of the song, which are Hayley Williams and Taylor York. Paramore has received three MTV awards, including one MTV Europe Music Awards, one Los Premios MTV Latinoamérica and one MTV Video Music Brasil.

== Awards and nominations ==
Award	Year (Note: Year in which awards ceremony was held.)	Nominee/work	Category	Result	Ref.
Alternative Press Music Award	2014	Paramore	Artist of the Year	Nominated	
Alternative Press Music Award	2014	Paramore	Album of the Year	Nominated	
Alternative Press Music Award	2014	"Still Into You"	Song of the Year	Nominated	
Alternative Press Music Award	2014	Hayley Williams	Best Vocalist	Nominated	
Alternative Press Music Award	2014	Jeremy Davis	Best Bassist	Nominated	
Alternative Press Music Award	2015	Hayley Williams	Best Vocalist	Won	
Alternative Press Music Award	2015	Paramore	Best Live Band	Nominated	
Alternative Press Music Award	2015	Paramore	Most Dedicated Fans	Nominated	
American Music Award	2008	Paramore	New Artist of the Year	Nominated	
Billboard Music Awards	2015	"Ain't It Fun"	Top Rock Song	Nominated	
Brit Award	2024	Paramore	International Group	Nominated	
Grammy Award	2008	Paramore	Best New Artist	Nominated	
Grammy Award	2010	"Decode"	Best Song Written for a Motion Picture, Television or Other Visual Media	Nominated	
Grammy Award	2011	"The Only Exception"	Best Pop Performance by a Duo or Group with Vocals	Nominated	
Grammy Award	2015	"Ain't It Fun"	Best Rock Song	Won	
Grammy Award	2024	"This Is Why"	Best Alternative Music Performance	Won	
Grammy Award	2024	This Is Why	Best Rock Album	Won	
International Dance Music Award	2014	"Ain't It Fun"	Best Alternative/Indie Rock Dance Track	Won	
Kerrang! Award	2010	Paramore	Best Live Band	Nominated	
Kerrang! Award	2010	Paramore	Best International Band	Nominated	
Kerrang! Award	2010	Brand New Eyes	Best Album	Won	
Kerrang! Award	2012	"Monster"	Best Video	Won	
Kerrang! Award	2012	Hayley Williams	Tweeter of the Year	Won	
Kerrang! Award	2012	Hayley Williams	Hottest Female	Won	
Kerrang! Award	2013	"Now"	Best Video	Won	
Kerrang! Award	2013	"Now"	Best Single	Nominated	
Los Premios MTV Latinoamérica	2008	Paramore	Best New Artist — International	Nominated	
Los Premios MTV Latinoamérica	2008	Paramore	Best Rock Artist — International	Nominated	
Los Premios MTV Latinoamérica	2009	Hayley Williams	Fashionista — Female	Won	
MTV Australia Award	2009	"Decode"	Best Rock Video	Nominated	
MTV Europe Music Award	2008	Paramore	Best Rock	Nominated	
MTV Europe Music Award	2009	Paramore	Best Alternative	Nominated	
MTV Europe Music Award	2010	Paramore	Best Alternative	Won	
MTV Europe Music Award	2011	Paramore	Biggest Fans	Nominated	
MTV Europe Music Award	2013	Paramore	Best Alternative	Nominated	
MTV Europe Music Award	2013	Paramore	Best World Stage	Nominated	
MTV Europe Music Award	2014	Paramore	Best Alternative	Nominated	
MTV Europe Music Award	2023	Paramore	Best Alternative	Nominated	
MTV Movie Award	2009	"Decode"	Best Song from a Movie	Nominated	
MTV Video Music Award	2008	"Crushcrushcrush"	Best Rock Video	Nominated	
MTV Video Music Award	2009	"Decode"	Best Rock Video	Nominated	
MTV Video Music Award	2010	"Ignorance"	Best Rock Video	Nominated	
MTV Video Music Award	2023	"This is Why"	Best Alternative	Nominated	
MTV Video Music Brazil	2008	Paramore	International Artist	Won	
MTV Video Music Brazil	2010	Paramore	International Artist	Nominated	
NME Award	2009	Hayley Williams	Sexiest Female	Won	
NME Award	2010	Paramore	Best International Band	Won	
NME Award	2010	Paramore	Worst Band	Nominated	
NME Award	2010	Paramore.net	Best Band Blog	Nominated	
NME Award	2012	Hayley Williams	Hottest Female	Won	
People's Choice Award	2010	Paramore	Favorite Rock Band	Won	
People's Choice Award	2011	Paramore	Favorite Rock Band	Won	
People's Choice Award	2014	Paramore	Favorite Band	Nominated	
People's Choice Award	2014	Paramore	Favorite Alternative Band	Nominated	
Radio Disney Music Award	2014	"Still Into You"	Best Crush Song	Won	
Teen Choice Award	2008	Paramore	Breakout Group	Won	
Teen Choice Award	2008	Paramore	Rock Group	Won	
Teen Choice Award	2008	"Crushcrushcrush"	Rock Track	Won	
Teen Choice Award	2009	Paramore	Rock Group	Won	
Teen Choice Award	2009	"Decode"	Rock Track	Won	
Teen Choice Award	2010	Paramore	Rock Group	Won	
Teen Choice Award	2010	"The Only Exception"	Love Song	Nominated	
Teen Choice Award	2010	"Ignorance"	Rock Track	Won	
Teen Choice Award	2010	Brand New Eyes	Album – Rock	Won	
Teen Choice Award	2011	Paramore	Rock Group	Won	
Teen Choice Award	2011	"Monster"	Rock Track	Won	
Teen Choice Award	2013	Paramore	Rock Group	Won	
Teen Choice Award	2014	Paramore	Rock Group	Nominated	
Teen Choice Award	2014	"Ain't It Fun"	Rock Song	Nominated	
Teen Choice Award	2017	Paramore	Rock Group	Nominated	
Teen Choice Award	2017	"Hard Times"	Rock/Alternative Song	Nominated	
Woodie Award	2008	Paramore	Woodie of the Year	Won	
