= Best New Artist (disambiguation) =

Best New Artist is a Grammy Award. It may also refer to:

- BET Award for Best New Artist
- Brit Award for Best New Artist
- Golden Melody Award for Best New Artist
- Grammy Award for Best New Artist
- Japan Record Award for Best New Artist
- Latin Grammy Award for Best New Artist
- Los Premios MTV Latinoamérica for Best New Artist — Central
- Los Premios MTV Latinoamérica for Best New Artist — International
- Los Premios MTV Latinoamérica for Best New Artist — North
- Los Premios MTV Latinoamérica for Best New Artist — South
- MAMA Award for Best New Artist
- Melon Music Award for Best New Artist
- MTV Video Music Award for Best New Artist
- MTV Europe Music Award for Best New Act
- MTV Video Music Award Japan for Best New Artist
- Mnet Asian Music Award for Best New Artist (Solo or Group)
- New Zealand Music Award for Best New Artist
- NAACP Image Award for Outstanding New Artist
- Premios 40 Principales for Best Spanish New Artist
- Radio Disney Music Award for Best New Artist
- Soul Train Music Award for Best New Artist
- Tejano Music Award for Best New Artist

== See also ==
- Breakthrough Artist of the Year (disambiguation)
