= Los Premios MTV Latinoamérica for Best New Artist — International =

Latino MTV award

This is a list of the Los Premios MTV Latinoamérica winners and nominees for Best New Artist — International.

Year	Winner	Other nominees
2002	Avril Lavigne	Gorillaz; Linkin Park; Nelly Furtado; System of a Down
2003	Evanescence	Audioslave; Beyoncé; t.A.T.u.; The White Stripes
2004	Maroon 5	Franz Ferdinand; Joss Stone; The Rasmus; Yellowcard
2005	My Chemical Romance	Ashlee Simpson; Gwen Stefani; Kelly Clarkson; The Killers
2006	James Blunt	Arctic Monkeys; Fall Out Boy; Pussycat Dolls; Rihanna
2007	Fergie	+44; Amy Winehouse; Klaxons; Lily Allen
2008	Tokio Hotel	Alizée; Jonas Brothers; Katy Perry; Paramore
2009	Lady Gaga	Ashley Tisdale; McFly; Taylor Swift; The Veronicas
