= Los Premios MTV Latinoamérica for Song of the Year =

Latino MTV award

This is a list of the Los Premios MTV Latinoamérica winners and nominees for Song of the Year.

| Year | Winner | Other nominees | Ref(s). |
|---|---|---|---|
| 2006 | Shakira — "Hips Don't Lie (featuring Wyclef Jean)" | James Blunt — "You're Beautiful"; Julieta Venegas — "Me Voy"; Madonna — "Hung Up"; Maná — "Labios Compartidos" | |
| 2007 | Avril Lavigne — "Girlfriend" | Enrique Iglesias — "Dímelo"; Julieta Venegas — "Eres para Mí (featuring Anita Tijoux)"; Ricky Martin — "Tu Recuerdo (featuring La Mari from Chambao and Tommy Torres)"; Rihanna — "Umbrella (featuring Jay-Z)" | |
| 2008 | Tokio Hotel — "Monsoon" | Jonas Brothers — "When You Look Me in the Eyes"; Juanes — "Me Enamora"; Julieta Venegas — "El Presente"; Katy Perry — "I Kissed a Girl" | |
| 2009 | Lady Gaga — "Poker Face" | Kings of Leon — "Use Somebody"; Nelly Furtado — "Manos al Aire"; Shakira — "Loba"; Wisin & Yandel — "Abusadora" | |
