= Los Premios MTV Latinoamérica for Fashionista — Male =

Latino MTV award

This is a list of the Los Premios MTV Latinoamérica winners and nominees for Fashionista — Male.

Year	Winner	Other nominees
2007	Pablo Holman (from Kudai)	Daddy Yankee; José "Pepe" Madero (from Panda); Juanes; Wilmer Valderrama
2008	Joe Jonas (from the Jonas Brothers)	Alejandro Sergi (from Miranda!); Bill Kaulitz (from Tokio Hotel); Jay de la Cueva (from Moderatto); José "Pepe" Madero (from Panda)
2009	Nick Jonas (from the Jonas Brothers)	Diego Fainello (from Sonohra); Gabe Saporta (from Cobra Starship); José "Pepe" Madero (from Panda); Pete Wentz (from Fall Out Boy)
