= Los Premios MTV Latinoamérica for Best MTV Tr3́s Artist =

Latino MTV award

This is a list of the Los Premios MTV Latinoamérica winners and nominees for Best MTV Tr3́s Artist.

Year	Winner	Other nominees
2006	MTV Tr3́s Viewer's Choice Award: Don Omar	Daddy Yankee; Luis Fonsi; Kumbia Kings; Ricky Martin
2007	MTV Tr3́s Viewer's Choice Award — Best Pop Artist: Aventura	Daddy Yankee; Enrique Iglesias; Jennifer Lopez; RKM & Ken-Y
2007	MTV Tr3́s Viewer's Choice Award — Best Urban Artist: Wisin & Yandel	Calle 13; Don Omar; Héctor el Father; Joell Ortiz
2007	MTV Tr3́s Viewer's Choice Award — Best New Artist: Kat DeLuna	Down AKA Kilo; Gustavo Laureano; Notch; Xtreme
2009	Best MTV Tr3́s Artist: Aventura	Calle 13; Pitbull; Tito El Bambino; Wisin & Yandel
2009	Best New MTV Tr3́s Artist: Da' Zoo	Franco "El Gorila"; Jazmín López; Marcy Place; Pee Wee
