= List of awards and nominations received by Franz Ferdinand =

Franz Ferdinand are a Scottish rock band formed in Glasgow in 2002. The band's original lineup was composed of Alex Kapranos (lead vocals and guitar, keyboard), Nick McCarthy (rhythm guitar, keyboards and backing vocals), Bob Hardy (bass guitar), and Paul Thomson (drums, percussion and backing vocals). Julian Corrie (keyboards, synthesiser, guitar and backing vocals) joined the band in 2017 after McCarthy left during the previous year. The band has been notable for being one of the more popular post-punk revival bands, garnering multiple UK top 20 hits. They have been nominated for several Grammy Awards and have received two Brit Awards – winning one for Best British Group – as well as one NME Award.

== Best Art Vinyl ==
The Best Art Vinyl is an annual award that first began in 2005. It celebrates artists and designers of vinyl record cover art.

Year	Nominee / work	Award	Result
2005	You Could Have It So Much Better	Best Art Vinyl	Nominated
2006	"The Fallen"	Best Art Vinyl	Nominated

== Brit Awards ==
The Brit Awards are the British Phonographic Industry's annual pop music awards.

Year	Nominee / work	Award	Result
2005	Franz Ferdinand	British Album of the Year	Nominated
2005	Franz Ferdinand	British Breakthrough Act	Nominated
2005	Franz Ferdinand	British Group	Won
2005	Franz Ferdinand	British Rock Act	Won
2005	Franz Ferdinand	British Live Act	Nominated
2006	Franz Ferdinand	British Group	Nominated
2006	Franz Ferdinand	British Rock Act	Nominated
2006	Franz Ferdinand	British Live Act	Nominated

== Danish Music Awards ==
The Danish Music Awards is a Danish award show.

Year	Nominee / work	Award	Result
2005	Franz Ferdinand	Foreign Newcomer of the Year	Won
2005	"Take Me Out"	Foreign Hit of the Year	Won

== ECHO Awards ==
The ECHO Award is a German music award granted every year by the Deutsche Phono-Akademie, an association of recording companies.

Year	Nominee / work	Award	Result
2006	Themselves	Best International Rock/Alternative Act	Nominated

== Grammy Awards ==
The Grammy Award is an award presented by The Recording Academy to recognize achievement in the mainly English-language music industry.

Year	Nominee / work	Award	Result
2005	"Take Me Out"	Best Rock Performance by a Duo or Group with Vocal	Nominated
2005	"Take Me Out"	Best Music Video	Nominated
2005	Franz Ferdinand	Best Alternative Music Album	Nominated
2006	"Do You Want To"	Best Rock Performance by a Duo or Group with Vocal	Nominated
2006	You Could Have It So Much Better	Best Alternative Music Album	Nominated

== Hungarian Music Awards ==
The Hungarian Music Awards is the national music awards of Hungary, held every year since 1992 and promoted by Mahasz.

Year	Nominee / work	Award	Result
2006	You Could Have It So Much Better	Best Foreign Rock Album	Nominated

== iHeartRadio Much Music Video Awards ==
The iHeartRadio Much Music Video Awards are annual awards presented by the Canadian television channel Much to honour the year's best music videos.

Year	Nominee / work	Award	Result
2006	"Do You Want To"	Best International Group Video	Nominated

== Ivor Novello Awards ==
The Ivor Novello Awards are awards for songwriting and composing.

Year	Nominee / work	Award	Result
2004	"Take Me Out"	Best Contemporary Song	Won

== Mercury Prize ==
The Mercury Prize is an annual music prize awarded for the best album from the United Kingdom and Ireland.

Year	Nominee / work	Award	Result
2004	Franz Ferdinand	Nationwide Building Society Mercury Prize	Won

== Meteor Music Awards ==
The Meteor Music Awards was an accolade bestowed upon professionals in the music industry in Ireland and further afield.

Year	Nominee / work	Award	Result
2005	Franz Ferdinand	Best Live Performance	Nominated
2005	Franz Ferdinand	Best International Group	Won
2005	Franz Ferdinand	Best International Album	Won
2006	Franz Ferdinand	Best International Group	Nominated

== MTV ==
=== Los Premios MTV Latinoamérica ===
The Los Premios MTV Latinoamérica was the Latin American version of the MTV Video Music Award.

Year	Nominee / work	Award	Result
2004	Franz Ferdinand	Best New Artist – International	Nominated

=== MTV Asia Awards ===
The MTV Asia Awards is the Asian equivalent of the Europe MTV Europe Music Award.

Year	Nominee / work	Award	Result
2005	"Take Me Out"	Favorite Video	Nominated
2006	"Do You Want To"	Favorite Video	Nominated
2006	Franz Ferdinand	Favorite Rock Act	Nominated

=== MTV Australia Awards ===
The MTV Australia Awards started in 2005 and were Australia's first awards show to celebrate both local and international acts.

Year	Nominee / work	Award	Result
2005	Franz Ferdinand	Best Breakthrough	Nominated

=== MTV Europe Music Awards ===
The MTV Europe Music Award is an award presented by Viacom International Media Networks Europe to honour artists and music in pop culture.

Year	Nominee / work	Award	Result
2004	Franz Ferdinand	Best New Act	Nominated
2004	Franz Ferdinand	Best Alternative	Nominated
2004	Franz Ferdinand	Best UK & Ireland Act	Nominated
2005	Franz Ferdinand	Best Rock	Nominated
2013	Franz Ferdinand	Best Alternative	Nominated

=== MTV Video Music Awards ===
The MTV Video Music Award is an award presented by the cable channel MTV to honor the best in the music video medium.

Year	Nominee / work	Award	Result
2004	"Take Me Out"	Breakthrough Video	Won
2004	"Take Me Out"	MTV2 Award	Nominated

=== MTV Video Music Awards Japan ===
The MTV Video Music Awards Japan are the Japanese version of the MTV Video Music Award.

Year	Nominee / work	Award	Result
2005	"Take Me Out"	Best New Artist	Nominated
2009	"Ulysses"	Best Group Video	Nominated
2009	"Ulysses"	Best Rock Video	Nominated

=== MTVU Woodie Awards ===
The MTV Woodie Awards is an annual music show presented by MTVU with awards voted on by fans.

Year	Nominee / work	Award	Result
2004	Franz Ferdinand	Soundtrack of My Life Woodie	Nominated

== NME Awards ==
The NME Awards is an annual music awards show in the United Kingdom.

Year	Nominee / work	Award	Result
2004	Franz Ferdinand	Philip Hall Radar Award	Won
2004	Franz Ferdinand	Best New Band	Nominated
2005	Franz Ferdinand	Best British Band	Nominated
2005	Franz Ferdinand	Best Live Band	Nominated
2005	Franz Ferdinand	Best Album	Won
2005	"Take Me Out"	Best Track	Won
2005	"Take Me Out"	Best Video	Nominated
2006	Franz Ferdinand	Best British Band	Nominated
2006	Franz Ferdinand	Best Live Band	Won
2006	You Could Have It So Much Better	Best Album	Nominated
2006	"Do You Want To"	Best Track	Nominated
2006	"Do You Want To"	Best Video	Nominated

== Pollstar Concert Industry Awards ==
The Pollstar Concert Industry Awards is an annual award ceremony to honor artists and professionals in the concert industry.

Year	Nominee / work	Award	Result
2005	Themselves	Best New Touring Artist	Won

== Q Awards ==
The Q Awards are the UK's annual music awards run by the music magazine Q.

Year	Nominee / work	Award	Result
2004	Franz Ferdinand	Best New Act	Nominated
2004	Franz Ferdinand	Best Album	Nominated
2004	"Take Me Out"	Best Track	Nominated
2004	"Take Me Out"	Best Video	Won

== Shortlist Music Prize ==
The Shortlist Music Prize was an annual music award for the best album released in the United States that had sold fewer than 500,000 copies at the time of nomination.

Year	Nominee / work	Award	Result
2004	Franz Ferdinand	Shortlist Music Prize	Nominated

== Teen Choice Awards ==
The Teen Choice Awards is an annual awards show that airs on the Fox Broadcasting Company television network.

Year	Nominee / work	Award	Result
2005	Franz Ferdinand	Choice Music: Rock Group	Nominated

== UK Music Video Awards ==
The UK Music Video Awards is an annual celebration of creativity, technical excellence and innovation in music video and moving image for music.

Year	Nominee / work	Award	Result
2009	"Ulysses"	Best Indie/Alternative Video	Nominated
2009	"No You Girls"	Best Editing in a Video	Nominated
2009	"No You Girls"	Best Styling in a Video	Nominated

== Other ==
In January Franz Ferdinand Shortlisted BBC Sound of 2004 Second Place.

In July 2009, Franz Ferdinand's "Take Me Out" was voted number 100 in Triple J Hottest 100 songs of all time.
