= MTV Europe Music Award for Best Latin America South Act =

List of award winners and nominees

The following is a list of the MTV Europe Music Award winners and nominees for Best Latin America South Act. This category was always won by Argentina.

== Winners and nominees ==
=== 2010s ===
Year	Artist	Nationality	Ref
2012
2012	Axel	Argentina	
2012	Babasónicos	Argentina	
2012	Campo	Uruguay	
2012	Miranda!	Argentina	
2012	Tan Biónica	Argentina	
2013
2013	Airbag	Argentina	
2013	Illya Kuryaki and the Valderramas	Argentina	
2013	No Te Va Gustar	Uruguay	
2013	Rayos Laser	Argentina	
2013	Tan Biónica	Argentina	
2014
2014	Miranda!	Argentina	
2014	Babasónicos	Argentina	
2014	Banda de Turistas	Argentina	
2014	Tan Biónica	Argentina	
2014	Maxi Trusso	Argentina	
2015
2015	Axel	Argentina	
2015	Indios	Argentina	
2015	Maxi Trusso	Argentina	
2015	Tan Biónica	Argentina	
2015	No Te Va Gustar	Uruguay	
2016
2016	Lali	Argentina	
2016	Babasónicos	Argentina	
2016	Illya Kuryaki and the Valderramas	Argentina	
2016	Será Pánico	Argentina	
2016	Tini	Argentina	
2017
2017	Lali	Argentina	
2017	Airbag	Argentina	
2017	Carajo	Argentina	
2017	Indios	Argentina	
2017	Oriana	Argentina	
2018
2018	Lali	Argentina	
2018	Duki	Argentina	
2018	Los Auténticos Decadentes	Argentina	
2018	Paulo Londra	Argentina	
2018	Tini	Argentina	
2019
2019	J Mena	Argentina	
2019	Lali	Argentina	
2019	Cazzu	Argentina	
2019	Paulo Londra	Argentina	
2019	Tini	Argentina	

=== 2020s ===
Year	Artist	Nationality	Ref
2020
2020	Lali	Argentina	
2020	Cazzu	Argentina	
2020	Khea	Argentina	
2020	Nicki Nicole	Argentina	
2020	Tini	Argentina	
2021
2021	Tini	Argentina	
2021	Duki	Argentina	
2021	Nicki Nicole	Argentina	
2021	María Becerra	Argentina	
2021	Trueno	Argentina	
2022
2022	Tini	Argentina	
2022	Bizarrap	Argentina	
2022	Duki	Argentina	
2022	María Becerra	Argentina	
2022	Tiago PZK	Argentina	
2023
2023	Lali	Argentina	
2023	Bizarrap	Argentina	
2023	Duki	Argentina	
2023	Fito Páez	Argentina	
2023	Nicki Nicole	Argentina	
2024
2024	Dillom	Argentina	
2024	Emilia	Argentina	
2024	Luck Ra	Argentina	
2024	María Becerra	Argentina	
2024	Trueno	Argentina	

== See also ==
- MTV Video Music Award for Best Latin Artist
- MTV VMA International Viewer's Choice Award for MTV Latin America
- MTV VMA International Viewer's Choice Award for MTV Internacional
- Los Premios MTV Latinoamérica
  - Los Premios MTV Latinoamérica for Best Artist — South
