= Los Premios MTV Latinoamérica for Best Video Game Soundtrack =

Latino MTV award

This is a list of the Los Premios MTV Latinoamérica winners and nominees for Best Video Game Soundtrack.

Year	Winner	Other nominees
2008	Guitar Hero III: Legends of Rock	FIFA 08; Grand Theft Auto IV; Need for Speed: ProStreet; Rock Band
2009	Rock Band — Green Day Pack	FIFA 09; Guitar Hero: Metallica; Guitar Hero World Tour; Shaun White Snowboarding
