= Los Premios MTV Latinoamérica for Best Movie =

Latino MTV award

This is a list of the Los Premios MTV Latinoamérica winners and nominees for Best Movie.

Year	Winner	Other nominees
2008	U23D	Across the Universe; Control; I'm Not There; Shine a Light
2009	Twilight	Transformers: Revenge of the Fallen
