= Los Premios MTV Latinoamérica for Best Ringtone =

Latino MTV award

This is a list of the Los Premios MTV Latinoamérica winners and nominees for Best Ringtone.

Year	Winner	Other nominees
2008	Tokio Hotel — "Monsoon"	Jonas Brothers — "When You Look Me in the Eyes"; Juanes — "Tres"; Julieta Venegas — "El Presente"; Madonna — "4 Minutes"
2009	Katy Perry — "Hot n Cold"	Britney Spears — "Womanizer"; Lady Gaga — "Poker Face"; Metro Station — "Shake It"; Wisin & Yandel — "Abusadora"
