= Breakthrough Artist of the Year =

Breakthrough Artist of the Year may refer to:

- Juno Award for Breakthrough Artist of the Year
- New Zealand Music Award for Breakthrough Artist of the Year
- Breakthrough Artist, an award at Los Premios MTV Latinoamérica
