= Los Premios MTV Latinoamérica for Fashionista — Female =

Latino MTV award

This is a list of the Los Premios MTV Latinoamérica winners and nominees for Fashionista — Female.

Year	Winner	Other nominees
2007	Paulina Rubio	Belinda; Ely Guerra; Hilary Duff; Martha Higareda
2008	Rihanna	Denisse Guerrero (from Belanova); Gabriela Villalba (from Kudai); Hayley Williams (from Paramore); Katy Perry
2009	Hayley Williams (from Paramore)	Fanny Lu; Katy Perry; Miley Cyrus; Shakira
