= Jose Tillan =

José Tillán (born May 24, 1966) is a media executive and professional musician, composer and producer whose career has primarily been focused on the Latin music industry. Tillán launched MATT Entertainment in 1993, where he managed Cuban-American singer-songwriter Nil Lara, Peruvian pop-roots singer-songwriter Pepe Alva and punk-rock outfit Joe Popp. After approximately 4 years as an artist manager, he closed MATT Entertainment and joined MTV Networks as the director of music and talent.

While at MTV, Tillán spearheaded MTV’s ‘Unplugged’ series for MTV Latin America with artists such as Shakira, Mana, Alejandro Sanz, La Ley, Julieta Venegas, Diego Torres and Ricky Martin. He also played a role in launching the MTV Video Music Awards Latin America, Latin America’s premiere award show and the network’s highest rated property. Since 2003, Tillan also produced and arrange the opening musical segments for the show, working closely with artists such as Ricky Martin, Juanes, Julieta Venegas, Daddy Yankee, La Ley, Vicentico, Alex Lora, Aterciopelados, Plastilina Mosh and Diego Torres.

As of 2016, Tillan was founder of babyelvis, a Wynwood-based production company showcasing Latin artists. He is a three-time Latin Grammy winner and continued to serve as the show's executive producer following his departure from MTV.
