= Robot Zonda =

Rock band

- Origin: Argentina, Buenos Aires
- Genres: Pop rock
- Years active: 2006–present
- Label: Independent
- Members: Kiko Robot; Javi Robot; Paky Robot; Billy Robot; Noe Robot; Dani Robot
- Website: Official Bandsite

Robot Zonda is an Argentinian rock band, formed in 2006 at Buenos Aires, composed of Kiko Robot (vocals), Javi Robot (guitar), Paky Robot (drums), Billy Robot (bass), Noe Robot (backing vocals) and Dani Robot (keyboards).

== Biography ==
=== Formation ===
Robot Zonda was formed in 2006 at Buenos Aires and keeps in activity at the present, performing hundreds of shows each year, both in their home town Buenos Aires and in other Argentina provinces and abroad. Robot Zonda is a rock band, with influences from hard rock, punk rock and grunge music.

=== National and International tours ===
From 2009 on, Robot Zonda performed at stages across the country, visiting many times La Plata city, Mendoza, Córdoba, Rosario and Costa Argentina.

Robot Zonda also went on International tours, visiting Chile twice, playing a total of five shows in the neighbour country, including two shows in the popular Blondie discothèque. In 2018 Robot Zonda performed for the first time in New York City

=== Main shows ===
Robot Zonda has performed in several stages and festivals all across Argentina. Some of the main shows were at Luna Park Stadium, performing as opening act of Deftones and QuickSandNYC, Hot Festival (with Catupecu Machu and Massive Attack among others), Código País Festival (at Hipódromo de Buenos Aires), "PUMA Urban Art" Festival (at Buenos Aires Design with Tan Biónica and No lo Soporto among others), Sónica Festival (at The Roxy with Massacre), "Rock & Barrios" Festival, XPOX (Extreme Sports Exposition), Ahora! Festival, Offside Festival (at Anfiteatro Mataderos with Heladeros del Tiempo), Ciudad Emergente Festival (at Centro Cultural Recoleta with Poncho and No Lo Soporto among others), "Rock en el Rojas" festival, "3D Animation Rocks" festival (at Centro Cultural Borges), three times at Groove, three times at Niceto Club, Salón Real, The Roxy (Los Arcos) and Plaza de Mayo. The band has performed with 2 Minutos, Stuka, Doble Fuerza and with alternative musicians such as Daniel Melero, Juana la Loca, Onda Vaga, Billordo, La Armada Cósmica and Callate Mark, among others.

=== Schools Tour ===
In 2009, Robot Zonda started a Schools Tour, performing live shows every day during two months in more than 44 schools at Buenos Aires City. The success of this idea, made Robot Zonda repeat the Schools Tour every year, including more schools and extending it to Buenos Aires Province too.

=== MTV Video Music Awards nomination ===
During 2009, Robot Zonda was nominated for MTV Video Music Awards Latinoamerica as Revelation Artist. It was achieved thanks to Robot Zondas' fans as they had to vote between several Argentinian bands.

=== Maravilla Martinez Tribute ===
In February 2013, Robot Zonda wrote a tribute song to the current box world champion, Sergio "Maravilla" Martinez. The song had a big impact in specialized world press and was used by Sergio "Maravilla" Martinez himself to celebrate his 38th birthday.

== Discography ==
=== Live recorded albums ===
- (2019) Robot Zonda Live at Luna Park Stadium

=== Studio albums ===
- (2020) Robot Zonda

== Official videos ==
Year	Song
2020	"No les importa nada"
2020	"Es Una Avalancha"
2020	"Estoy Re Loco"
2020	"Héroe Popular"
