= Flor (singer) =

Argentine female pop and rock singer

- Born: Florencia Caserta; April 13, 1984 (age 42)
- Origin: El Palomar, Buenos Aires, Argentina
- Genres: Pop rock, rock
- Occupation: Singer
- Instruments: Voice, guitar
- Years active: 2001—
- Label: Universal

Florencia "Flor" Caserta (born April 13, 1984) is an Argentine female pop and rock singer.

== Biography ==
Caserta was born in El Palomar, Buenos Aires. She met Pablo Romero, singer of the band Árbol, who heard her singing and invited her to make a disc of covers from different bands from El Oeste (the western zone of Greater Buenos Aires). It was there that she recorded her first song, “Mañana en el Abasto”, by Sumo.

After that, they proposed that she record some demos of pop music. The process lasted two years, until they obtained five songs which they presented to producer Gustavo Santaolalla.

== Discography ==
Flor's first album is the self-titled Flor (2006). Tracks include:

- "La Respuesta" (The Answer)
- "No, nada" (No, nothing)
- "Aire" (Air)
- "Igual" (Same One)
- "Sal" (Get Out)
- "Girar" (To Turn)
- "Así" (Like This)
- "¿Qué será?" (What Will Be?)
- "Jazmín"

"Jazmín" was the album's first single. "La Respuesta" was its second single.

== Charts ==
Song	Country	Peak position	Link
"Jazmín"	Uruguay Top 20	#19	

== Production ==
Pablo Romero, Gustavo Santaolalla, Adrián Sosa. Associated Producer: Aníbal Kerpel.

The album was recorded in Los Angeles, California by Aníbal Kerpel and mixed in "La Casa" studios in Los Angeles.

== See also ==
- Mononymous persons
