= Entre Ríos (band) =

Argentine musical ensemble

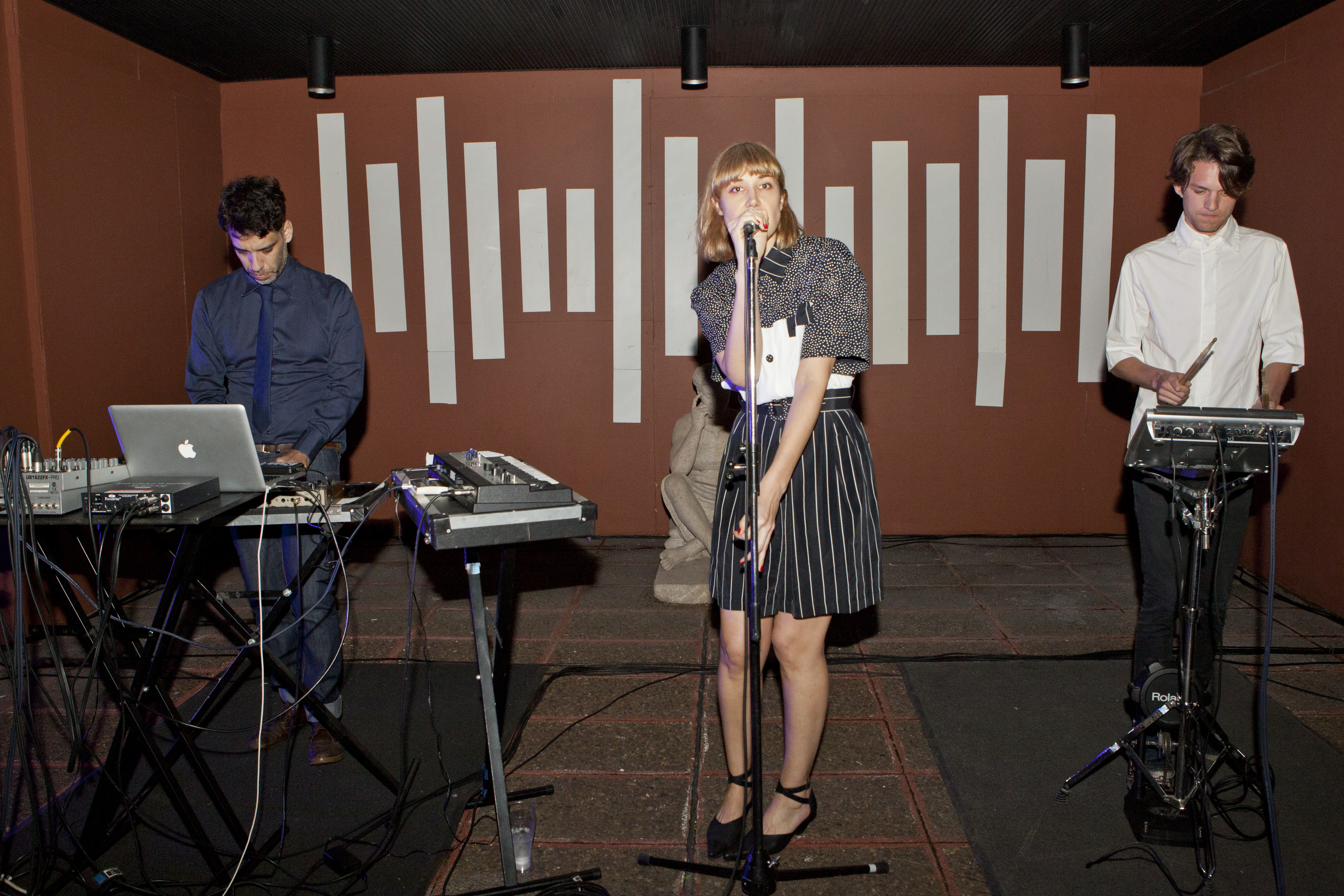
- Entre Ríos performing in 2014 at the Museo Nacional de Bellas Artes

Background information
- Origin: Buenos Aires, Argentina
- Genre: Indietronica
- Years active: 2000 - present
- Labels: Elefant Records, Índice Virgen
- Members: Sebastián Carreras (synthesizers); Gabriel Lucena (programming); Rosario Ortega (vocals); Romina Dangelo (drums)
- Past members: Isol (vocals); Paula Meijide (vocals)

Entre Ríos is an Argentine indietronica band originally formed in Buenos Aires by Sebastián Carreras, Gabriel Lucena and Isol (Marisol Misenta) in 2000. They became popular when the song "Hoy no" was used in a Quilmes spot.

In 2005 Isol left the group the release of their album Onda. She was replaced by Paula Meijide, who was part of the band until 2006. In 2008, Rosario Ortega and Romina Dangelo joined Entre Ríos as the vocalist and drummer respectively.

They have performed many gigs around Spain and Latin America, and were a big influence for other groups such as Miranda! and Belanova.

== Discography ==
- Litoral, EP, 2000
- Temporal, EP, 2001
- Provincia, 2001
- Idioma suave (trans. "Gentle Language"), 2002
- Sal (trans. both "Salt" and "Come Out"), 2003
- Completo, 2005
- Onda (trans. "Wave"), 2005
- Entre Ríos (trans. "Between Rivers"), 2008
