= El Otro Yo =

Argentine rock band

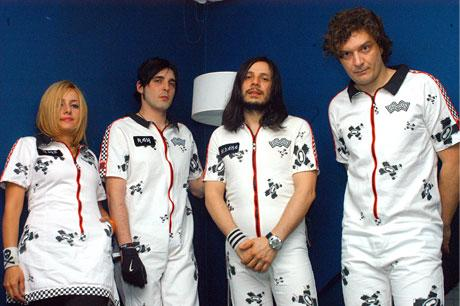

Background information
- Origin: Temperley, Lomas de Zamora, Argentina
- Genres: Alternative rock; punk
- Years active: 1990–2016 (indefinite hiatus)
- Label: Besótico Records
- Members: Cristian Aldana; María Fernanda Aldana; Joan Sprei; Gabriel Guerrisi; Ezequiel Araujo
- Website: elotroyo.com

El Otro Yo ([el ˈotɾo ˈʝo], "The Other Me") is an Argentinean alternative rock band. They made their debut in the late 1980s / early 1990s, with a demo tape called Los Hijos de Alien, followed by Traka-Traka. Later on, the group founded their own label, Besotico Records.

== From the beginnings in Temperley to Abrecaminos (1988–1999) ==
El Otro Yo formed in the late 1980s/early 1990s in Temperley, in the south of Greater Buenos Aires. At the age of five, Humberto Cristian and María Fernanda Aldana started playing music at home with their father's classical guitar (he was a bolero and tango singer in old bars) and a GEM organ. Under the influence of their mother, who was a poet, they started writing their first songs, which were simple in the early stages but revolutionary nonetheless, in the style of Velvet Underground & Nico. At school, they played together in a band called Revolución, where they covered songs by Sumo, Virus and Miguel Mateos. Afterwards, Cristian formed his first punk rock band: Los Apáticos. Between 1986 and 1987, Cristian played in Los Apáticos and El Gregal, where Ricky Rúa (current EOY drummer) played drums; meanwhile María became part of groups such as Rebecca, whose drummer was also Ricky Rúa. Around those years, they decided to form a band together. Marifer had read a letter that French poet Arthur Rimbaud wrote when he was 16 and which stated "I Am Another" ("Je Suis Un Autre"); that phrase was imbedded in her memory during the formative years of the band. In January 1988, María told Cristian about the title of the poem, he rounded off the idea and thus El Otro Yo became the definite name of the band.

Early line ups included musicians such as Sergio Ucci (Alerta Roja), Gabo Manelli (Los Brujos, Juana La Loca and Babasónicos), Lee-chi (Los Brujos) and many more. Back then, María Fernanda played keyboards meanwhile Cristian was the lead singer and guitar player. Later on, Omar Kischinovsky joined the band on drums and Daniel Rodríguez on bass, but Daniel left the band to pursue a career playing the sitar, which has proved to be successful. Due to the lack of a bass player, María Fernanda left the keyboards to replace Daniel. Now a trio, they left Temperley and started playing in Capital Federal, Córdoba, Mendoza and other Argentinian provinces. There are several demos that capture the work of all these line ups, but they never were released on CD. Back in 1992, they already had a demo with two tracks ("Los pájaros" and "Sexo en el elevador") and used two decks to make home recordings of songs such as "Analía", "Hola papá", "Vacaciones" and "Caminando". That same year, they released their first self-managed production: LOS HIJOS DE ALIEN. It was the first release of Besótico Records, the band's own label, thus sealing their independent personality. Carrying a small backpack, Cristian was in charge of distributing the album around the record shops. The cassette was regarded as Best Record of the Year by No, the rock section of Página 12, and also voted by several well-known artists as Best Album on the Sí music section of Clarín.

It was then when Daniela Cugliándolo and Sudor frío, her theatre group, joined the band on stage with a performance that depicted two actresses emulating one person. Later on, Daniela kept doing live performances that reflected the different emotions representing the intensity of the music. She appears on the "Corta el pasto" video with giant wings and a set of pruning shears. Afterwards, she became their keyboard player. In 1994, the three band members – Humberto Cristian Aldana (guitar and voice), his sister María Fernanda (bass and voice), and Omar Kischinovsky (drums) – record at Moebio Studios their second album and first CD: TRAKA TRAKA. Their artistic producer was Guillermo Picolini (Toreros Muertos, Pachuco Cadáver). The CD was launched at the Confitería Ideal.

In 1995, drummer Omar Kischinovsky decides to leave after having played in the band for almost three years. His final show was at El Borde, in Temperley. He was replaced by Raimundo Horacio Fajardo. The band's international debut was in Chile, in an exchange with Pánico. The same year, they record MUNDO, which has the distinctive feature of having been recorded with a portable four-track and using as a recording booth a derelict Dodge Polara that belonged to the Aldana family. The album was mixed by Diego Vainer, its recording engineer was Pablo Márquez and it was launched at Dr. Jekyll. To wrap up the year, they recorded a cover version of "Fuck You", which was the title of a tribute album to Sumo.

In 1996, they re-release a CD version of LOS HIJOS DE ALIEN, with unreleased versions of tracks such as "Lo de adentro" and a remix of "69", from the album MUNDO, in a production of Fantasías Animadas. That year, they join the Rock & Pop Alternativo Festival at Ferro Stadium, along with Soda Stereo, Nick Cave and the Bad Seeds, Silverchair, Tracy Bonham and Robi Draco Rosa among others, thus becoming one of the best bands in the country. The following year, María Fernanda told Cristian that she had some very experimental songs of her own that she would like to release. The project kept growing until it became a triple album called ESENCIA, which had a great CD edition and an album recorded by each band member. ESENCIA includes over 70 tracks divided into three albums that were recorded independently. It was presented on two occasions: at the Santa María Theatre and at the Ricardo Rojas Cultural Centre; the latter gathered the biggest audience of the Molotov Sessions (Ciclo Molotov).

In 1998, after touring around the country with Attaque 77, they release a 25-song compilation album called EL OTRO YO DEL OTRO YO, which includes the most outstanding songs of ESENCIA. Besótico also releases a book and solo album by María Fernanda called ENTRESUEÑOS. At the same time, they release EL MAR ALADO, a poetry booked penned by Ray.

In ’99, they release ABRECAMINOS, produced by Diego Vainer. This album will be widely accepted by the audience, thus expanding the frontiers of El Otro Yo. It was presented at the General San Martín Theatre. With songs such as "No me importa morir", "La música", "Melodías vibradoras" and "10.000.000", the band breaks the boundaries of the underground scene. That year, Ezequiel Araujo, Avant Press former bass player, joins the band on keyboards, after Daniela Cugliándolo (who by then had become a theatre director) moved to Barcelona, where nowadays she films and directs Super 8 art videos and is part of Spanish group Bradien.

== Contagiándose la energía del otro and the key of success (2000–07) ==
In early 2000, they continue touring around different neighborhoods, taking their music to the whole of Buenos Aires and other Argentinian provinces. Their shows in Chile, Uruguay and Peru prove to be successful, and their fan base in those countries rapidly increases. At this stage, Besótico Records starts releasing albums by Sugar Tampaxxx, Victoria Mil (former Victoria Abril), She-Devils, Rey Gurú and De Romanticistas Shaolin. This was a key year for El Otro Yo. By mid-year, they record a new live album during two shows at Cemento. This album was called CONTAGIÁNDOSE LA ENERGÍA DEL OTRO. After years of an independent career, their well-known Gira Interminable tour took them to Obras Sanitarias Stadium for the first time, where they presented their latest production. The street posters for the show read "Independent rock arrives to Obras". Over five thousand people gathered at this special show. To wrap up the year, they reached an agreement with Gustavo Santaolalla and his Surco label to release ABRECAMINOS internationally.

In 2001, a remastered re-edition of TRAKA TRAKA goes on sale and ABRECAMINOS is released in the United States and Mexico. They embark on a new Gira Interminable around the country, finishing up once again at Obras Sanitarias Stadium, with guests such as Leo García, Adrián Dárgelos and Rosario Bléfari, among others. As the frontiers expand, they play in the United States and Mexico for the first time. They join the Watcha Tour along with Los Enanitos Verdes, Molotov, La Ley, Juanes, Bersuit Vergarabat and Dover, among others. During this tour, and with the help of Gustavo Santaolalla, La Ley invites EOY to play at the Greek Theatre in Los Angeles, with an audience of over 20.000 people. In addition, the band meets Justin Meldal-Johnsen (bass player for Beck, Nine Inch Nails and Air, among others), who invites Beck to an EOY gig in Los Angeles.

During 2002, the band starts recording COLMENA, which is released in December, with "Inmaduro" as its first single. COLMENA is the hive where they concentrated the resulting product of the pollen they collected in each place they visited, shaping and packing it into a CD with fourteen songs and an interactive video. The new material, with an unusual and original cover art, was produced once again by Diego Vainer and featured guests such as Gustavo Santaolalla, Horacio "Gamexane" Villafañe (Todos Tus Muertos), Mariano Martínez (Attaque 77) and Ricardo Espinoza (Flema). It reflects a musical evolution and a greater integration in the songwriting process. Some of the most outstanding tracks are "Inmaduro", "Viajero", "Virus", "Calles" or "Me harté".

In 2004, the band releases ESPEJISMOS. That year, keyboard player Ezequiel Araujo decides to follow a new path as a producer (Intoxicados, Fidel and many others) and leaves the band. By synchronicity of the magical musical destiny, he is immediately replaced by Gabriel Guerrisi, distant cousin of the Aldana siblings and founder of Los Brujos (mega band from the 1990s), who had just left Juana La Loca. The hardcore moments and strong messages about society and the system that the band always conveyed are back on ESPEJISMOS ("Pecadores", "Nuevo orden", "Mascota del sistema" and its first single "Licuadora mutiladora"). Nevertheless, they also show a softer side on songs such as "Debe cambiar" or "Tu ángel". The album is played at the Obras Sanitarias Stadium on 16 April 2005. That same year, they release PIRATA, a live album with songs captured by the fans during the band's latest tour.

In 2006, Besótico releases Marifer's new solo album: DIOS TE SALVE MARÍA, a piano CD that comes with poetry and which was recorded at La Alianza Francesa and produced by Diego Vainer and Ezequiel Araujo. Furthermore, the label releases the live CD of the band's first show at Obras Sanitarias Stadium on 4 November 2000. CONTAGIÁNDOSE LA ENERGÍA DEL OTRO captures on CD and DVD the best moments of the night. The set list includes the band's most acclaimed songs (“10.000.000”, “No me importa morir”, “La música”, “EOY”, “Alegría”) and some distinctive guests: metal singer Claudio O’Connor on “69” and Diego Arnedo on “Fuck You”. The album includes an unreleased track called “Lobizón” and the DVD features documentaries about the 2000 Gira Interminable tour and backstage moments at Obras Sanitarias.

== 20 years traveling out of time: Fuera del Tiempo (2007–09) ==
In June 2007, FUERA DEL TIEMPO goes on sale. The album was produced by Patricio Claypole and American producer Billy Anderson (Melvins, Mr. Bungle, Sick of It All and Los Natas), among others. By the end of the year, the band plays in Ecuador for the first time at the international festival of independent bands, representing Argentina.

In 2008, they officially present FUERA DEL TIEMPO at the Obras Sanitarias Stadium. Once again, they kick off a national and international tour, under the mentorship of Diego Vainer, who also plays synthesizers and keyboards live. During the tour, the play in places such as the Vive Latino Festival, the Foro Sol in Mexico and the pyramids of the Música para los Dioses Festival. They also tour around Mexico with local band Café Tacuba. In October, they release ESTALLANDO TU LADO SALVAJE, a live CD and DVD from the 2005 show at Obras Sanitarias Stadium, where they presented ESPEJISMOS. This edition also includes images from previous tours and shows, such as the Pepsi Music show in 2007.At the end of the year, they celebrate their 20th anniversary with a show at Parque Roca, with special guests such as Horacio “Gamexane” Villafañe (Todos Tus Muertos), Walas (Massacre), Fernando Ruiz Díaz (Catupecu Machu), Ale Sergi y Juliana Gattas (Miranda), Chary (Loquero), and former EOY members like former drummer Omar Kischinovsky and “Osvaldito”, one of the first bass players, among other guests. On the other hand, they become the first Argentinian rock band to design a pair of trainers with Vans’ Black Fin.

In 2009, they travel to Mexico to record a new album under the production of Paco Huidobro. Furthermore, Cristian becomes the chairman of the Union of Independent Musicians (Unión de Músicos Independientes), a civil association that gathers over 6000 registered bands. In October, and after 15 years, Ray Fajardo decides to leave the band. Once again, musical dharma materializes and, on this occasion, Ricky Rúa becomes EOY drummer. Ricky was the singer in Los Brujos as well as drummer in the first bands that the Aldana siblings formed.

== From Ailabiu EOY to 5ta Dimensión (2010–) ==
The band celebrated the special Argentinian and Mexican editions of their new studio album, AILABIU EOY, which was artistically produced by Paco Huidobro and had Jason Carmer's technical production. The album was recorded in Mexico City in 2009, mastered by Harris Newman (Arcade Fire, Crystal Castles) at Grey Market Mastering, in Montreal (Canada), and featured renowned members from Café Tacuba, Molotov and Fobia. Along with the release of the album, they become the third band in the world (after Nine Inch Nails and Radiohead) to transform their official website into a social network, called Comunidad EOY, where thousands of fans around the world can sign up and upload pictures, videos, chat with other fans, make friends and get the latest updates on the band. They are also the first Latin American band to offer their own application to iPhone, iPad and iPod Touch users. In addition, they created EOY TV, their own television channel, which can be viewed on their official website. At the same time, their songs become available on all digital stores around the world.

In 2010, they shoot three videos: “Siempre fui yo” (directed by Guillermo Tragant), “Ailabiu” (directed by Juan Chappa) and “Velero” (directed by Mov Productions and with illustrations by Pablo Bisoglio, who also designed many of the band's album covers). Furthermore, the band was asked by MTV Latin America to perform a song for the MTV Bicentennial special.

They keep on touring on a national and international level and in October they are chosen by Pixies as guest act for their show at the Luna Park. They are the only Argentinian band to play at the Maquinaria Fest in Chile, where they share the stage with Pixies, Hoppo, Yo La Tengo, Cansei de Ser Sexy, Queens of the Stone Age, Linkin Park and Incubus, among other bands. In November, they are chosen by Smashing Pumpkins to open their show at the Luna Park.

In 2011, they kicked off the year by reviewing their first two records, LOS HIJOS DE ALIEN y TRAKA TRAKA, as well as playing songs from their new record at Unione e Benevolenza. In May, they played an acoustic set at the Centro Cultural de la Memoria Haroldo Conti, in the former ESMA. At the end of that month, they officially launched AILABIU EOY at the Salón Dorado, adding songs from MUNDO and ABRECAMINOS to the repertoire. In July, they debut the video for "El verano". On an international level, they joined the Unite Tour, which took them all over Mexico during three months and allowed them to play at the prestigious Cervantino Festival in Guanajuato. The band closed the “Espacio Joven” in Tecnópolis, where they played in two occasions (the final show being a special tribute to Horacio "Gamexane" Villafañe, a dear friend of the band), and also closed the festival that celebrated the National Law of Music, at Dos Congresos Square. They ended the year with two shows at Groove. Marifer Aldana releases a new solo album called “Noosfera”, which features guests such as Diego Vainer, Gerardo Farez and Ezequiel Araujo, among other friends.

In early 2012, they went into Panda and Cuzco studios to record their tenth album, 5TA DIMENSIÓN, produced by Gabriel Guerrisi and Cristian Aldana. The record was released in June 2012 and was presented with a show at the Vorterix Theatre. The first single was “Los niños”, a song about gender-based violence. 5TA DIMENSIÓN was presented with a tour around the country, with over 20 dates from North to South. They ended the year at El Teatro de Flores with a show that had Ezequiel Araujo back on keyboards on a permanent basis.

2013 was a special year as the band celebrated their 25th anniversary. The celebrations included a series of shows: the first one was in February at the Vorterix Theatre, where they celebrated the 10th anniversary of COLMENA. In May, it was the turn of "El Otro Yo para poguear", with the band's wildest songs being played at El Teatro de Flores. In September, they did an unplugged show at the ND Theatre, with 15 musicians on stage playing a string quartet, percussion and wind instruments. Special guests such Guillermo Piccolini, Diego Vainer and Gerardo Farez joined the band for this show. In October, they went back to the Vorterix Theatre for the "Mamelucos Fest Silver Anniversary", which saw the return of the overalls and the opportunity for a fan to win the band's official overall. That same month, they released PLATÓN EN LA 5TA DIMENSIÓN, with marked the official launch of 5TA DIMENSIÓN in record stores and which included the track "Platón", produced by Ezequiel Araujo. From this record, videos were made for "Saltar", "Te quiero" and "Dinero 666". They concluded the celebrations at the Auditorio Sur in Temperley with a show called "25 years, 50 songs", with a set list put together by the fans through the social networks.

== Discography ==
=== Studio albums ===
- Los Hijos De Alien (1993)
- Traka Traka (1994)
- Mundo (1995)
- Esencia (1997)
- Abrecaminos (1999)
- Colmena (2002)
- Espejismos (2004)
- Fuera del Tiempo (2007)
- Ailabiu EOY (2010)
- 5ta Dimensión (2012)
- Platón en la 5ta Dimensión (2013)

=== Live albums ===
- Contagiándose La Energía Del Otro (2000)
- Contagiándose La Energía Del Otro en vivo en Obras (2005)
- Pirata (2005)
- Estallando Tu Lado Salvaje (2008)

=== Compilations ===
- El Otro Yo del Otro Yo (1998)

=== DVDs ===
- Contagiándose La Energía Del Otro en vivo en Obras (CD + DVD) (2005)
- El Otro Yo en vivo Quilmes Rock 03 (DVD) (2005)
- Fuera del Tiempo (CD + DVD) (2007) (Mexico only)
- Estallando Tu Lado Salvaje (DVD + CD) (2008)
