= Érica García =

Argentinian composer and singer (born 1968)

- Born: Érica García; 6 April 1968 (age 58)
- Origin: Buenos Aires, Argentina
- Genres: Alternative rock, Psychedelic rock
- Occupation: Musician
- Instruments: Guitar; Bass guitar Piano; Vocals; Percussion
- Labels: Universal Music Group, Manimal Vinyl, Onomatic

Érica García (born 6 April 1968) is an Argentine composer and singer. She was nominated in the Latin Grammy Awards of 2000 for Best Female Rock Vocal Performance for her popular tune "Vete Destino" but did not win. While best known as a rock singer, she also sings tango music and jazz. She has worked as a writer, painter, fashion designer and television personality among other creative endeavours. Part of her ancestry can be traced to the Guaraní people.

== Musical career ==
García began her solo career in 1996 after 3 years of playing in Mata Violeta, the punk rock band she created in 1991. She made three records for Universal Music Group, the first one was produced by Ricardo Mollo (her partner in the years 1989-1999), the second one (nominated for the Latin Grammy) was produced by Garcia herself and Ricardo Mollo and the third record Amorama, was produced by Gustavo Santaolalla. Rolling Stone Argentina would describe Amorama as "the most important 2001 Argentine launch of the multinational Universal [Music Group]" that following year. García would tour with Enrique Bunbury who would declare that her voice is "born for rock." In 2003, she would perform in the Latin Alternative Music Conference. Of her participation there The New York Times would state, "that night's most impressive showing came in the PJ Harvey-like confidence of the Argentine singer Erica García, one of the few women who plays guitar and writes her own songs to reach international fame in this male-dominated genre."

García played and recorded in the Los Angeles musical collective Fool's Gold. She recorded and produced her fourth album ¨Afternoon in Bamboos¨ in Silver Lake, Los Angeles, 2006. She created the band Mountain Party to play the Hypnorituals and Mesmemusical miracles Hanging in the sky, an iconic folk festival curated by Devendra Banhart. García would also study acting at the Stella Adler Studio of Acting under Norman Brisky. She returned to her country Argentina in 2010. She organized the Santo Bombo parties, with bombo legüero performances, dancers, tattoo artists, and electronic music. She played the Hot Festival in October 2010, with Massive Attack, Scissors Sisters, Yeasayer and Mika among other artists. García currently lives in Buenos Aires, and she plays shows all over the country. She directs Escuela de Experimentacion Vocal. In 2014 she released an album of tangos titled Tangos Vampiros.

== Collaborations ==
Garcia collaborated with the band Divididos, on ukulele and accordion in "El Burrito" and "Sisters", she served as the guest musician (1992 to 1998) with Brazzaville in two albums. She performed with Café Tacuba, Ely Guerra, Los Tres and Javiera Parra at the MTV Latin awards in Los Angeles, 2002. Her other collaboration include Brazzaville, Cienfuegos
Hecuba
Montecarlo Jazz Ensemble
Pampa del Indio
Andrea Alvarez
Fool's Gold

== Discography ==
=== Solo ===
- El cerebro (1997) Producer : Ricardo Mollo

Musicians:
Erica Garcia
Martin Aloe
Alejo Vintrob
Max Araujo
Ervin Stutz
Fabian Von Quntiero

- La bestia (1998) Producer: Erica Garcia and Ricardo Mollo

Musicians:
Erica Garcia
Martin Aloe
Fernando Samalea
Ricardo Mollo
Ervin Stutz
Matias Zapata

- Amorama (2001) Producer: Gustavo Santaolalla

Musicians:
Justin Meldhal Johnsen
Jon Brion
Victor Indrizzo
Roger Manning Jr.
Joe Gore
David Campbell
Sebastian Escofet
Javier Casalla
Gustavo Santaolalla

- Tangos Vampiros (2014)

=== As Mountain Party ===
- Afternoon in Bamboos (2006)

=== As Lady Grave ===
- Lady Grave (2006)

=== Compilations ===
"New Weird American "2007 "Surco Artists "2000

== Tributes ==
"Through the Wilderness" Madonna Tribute (Manimal Vinyl) 2006 "Tributo a Sandro", "Quiero llenarme de ti" 2000

== Awards ==
- Latin Grammy Nomination, 2000
- Premio Gardel 1999 Nominacion, Mejor Artista de rock
- Premio Gardel 2002 Nominacion
- MTV Latin awards nominee
- Best female singer, Rolling Stone Latin America 2000, 2001, 2002
- Best New Artist, 2000, awarded by Diario Clarin
- One of the 20 women of the year, 2000, awarded by Diario Clarin

== Film and TV career ==
"The Treasure of the Black Jaguar" (2010) directed by Mike Bruce: as "Carmelita"."Franco Buenaventura" (2002) as "Gisela".
