= División Minúscula =

Mexican rock band

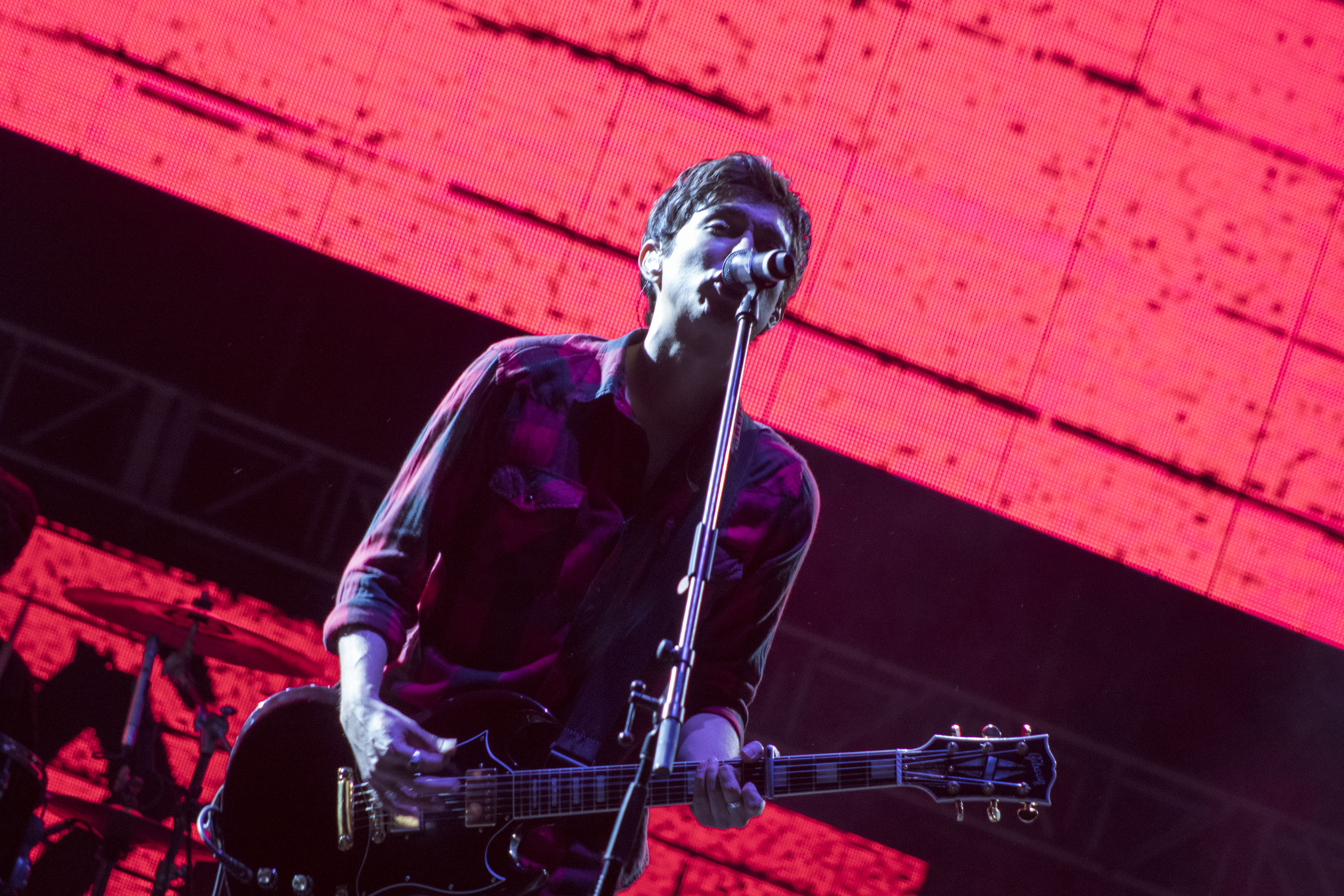

Background information
- Origin: Matamoros, Tamaulipas
- Genres: Alternative rock • pop punk • indie rock • desert rock
- Years active: 1996–present
- Labels: Sones del Mexside, Universal
- Members: Javier Blake; Kiko Blake; Alejandro Luque; Ricardo Pérez

División Minúscula (Spanish for "Minuscule Division") is a Mexican rock band from Matamoros, Tamaulipas.

== History ==
The four members of División Minúscula, Javier Blake (singer-guitarist), Ricci Pérez (guitarist), Kiko Blake (drummer) and Alejandro Luque (bassist), formed the band in late 90s, in the town of Matamoros, Tamaulipas. After reuniting they hooked up with Toy Hernandez, the man behind Control Machete, who signed them to his Sones del Mexside label.

The group’s 2001 debut was Extrañando Casa ("Homesick"). After a five-year hiatus the band reunited and released a new record, Defecto Perfecto ("Perfect Defect").

The group were nominated in the MTV Video Music Awards Latin America in two categories, "Promising Artist" and "Best Alternative Act", but didn't win anything. Defecto Perfecto, was certified Gold by AMPROFON on May 31, 2007.

== Members ==
Javier Blake - Vocals, Guitar (1996–Present)
Ricci Perez - Guitar (1996 - 2007, 2011–Present)
Alejandro Luque - Bass (1996–Present)
Kiko Blake - Drums (1996–Present)
Efrén Barón - Guitar (2008–2019)
Eduaro Vela - Guitar (2020-Present)

== Discography ==
- Extrañando Casa (2001)
- Defecto Perfecto (2006)
- Sirenas (2008)
- División (2012)
- Secretos - EP (2016)
- Escombros - EP (2023)

== Singles ==
- "Televidente" (2003)
- "Extrañando Casa" (2003)
- "Cursi" (2004)
- "Sismo" (2006)
- "Veneno Es Antídoto (S.O.S.)" (2006)
- "Sognare" (2007)
- "Control" (2008)
- "Las Luces de Esta Ciudad" (2009)
- "Tan Fuerte, Tan Fragil" (2009)
- "Sed" (2012)
- "Voces" (2013)
- "Frenesí" (2016)
- "Humanos Como Tú - En Vivo" (2018)
- "Año Nuevo - En Vivo" (2018)
- "Laberintos" (2022)
- "La Última Llamada" (2022)
- "Escombros" (2022)
