= Moderatto =

Pop-rock band

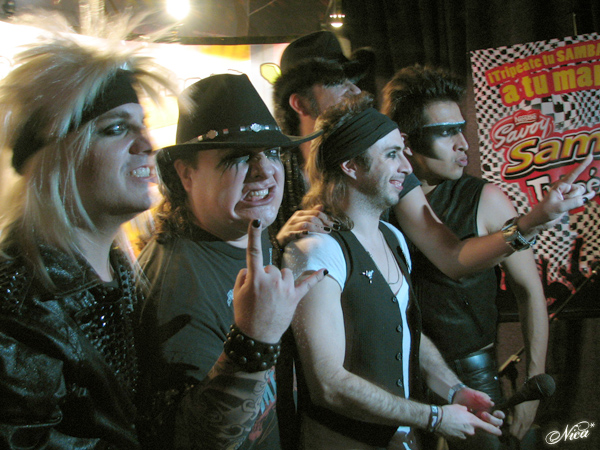

Background information
- Origin: Mexico City, Mexico
- Genres: Glam rock, pop rock, pop metal, glam metal, alternative rock, heavy metal, hard rock
- Years active: 1999–2024
- Labels: EMI
- Members: Jay de la Cueva; Xavi Moderatto; Marcello Lara; Roy Ochoa Avilés; Elohim Corona
- Website: moderatto.com

Moderatto was a Mexican rock band from Mexico City, known for their exaggerated on-stage personae that parody the stereotypical 1980s glam metal lifestyle. Moderatto started as a cover band in the late 1990s and released their debut CD Resurrexíon in 2001. The band has been successful since then, with three of their first five albums being awarded platinum.

== Career ==
Moderatto formed in the late 1990s. It began playing in 2001 in Mexico City, then consisting of five friends: Jay de la Cueva, Javier Ramírez, Marcelo Lara, Iñaki Vazquez and Olallo Rubio. They launched their mainstream debut CD Resurrexión in 2001. This album quickly gained popularity thanks to their first single "Márchate Ya" and later "Isabel". In November 2004 they launched El Detector de Metal, whose first single, a cover of Timbiriche's "Muriendo Lento", featured female pop singer Belinda as a collaboration with her.

The group released ¡Grrrr! at the end of 2006 with its first single, "Sentimettal", which climbed to No. 3 on the Mexican Top 40 in three weeks.

Three of their first five albums were certified platinum.

In addition to Mexico and Latin America, they also performed at Yokohama's Red Brick Warehouse on 24 July 2010 and The Trump Room in Shibuya, Tokyo the following day.

== Discography ==
- Resurrexión (2001)
- El Detector de Metal (2004)
- Nos vemos en el invierno (2005)
- En Directo... Ponte Loco! (2006)
- ¡Grrrr! (2006)
- Moderatto Army (2007)
- Queremos Rock (2008)
- Carisma (2012)
- Malditos Pecadores (2014)
- Volviendo Japonés (2016)
- Moderatto XV: Todos Los Éxitos (2017)
- Rockea Bien Duro (2022)
