= Premios MTV Latinoamérica =

MTV Latin America Awards
- Native name: Premios MTV Latinoamérica
- Awarded for: Notable musicians and music videos in Latin America
- Country: United States
- Presented by: MTV Latin America
- Formerly called: MTV Video Music Awards Latin America (2002–2005)
- First award: October 24, 2002; 24 years ago
- Final award: October 15, 2009; 17 years ago
- Website: http://mtvla.com

Television/radio coverage
- Network: MTV Latin America

The MTV Latin America Awards, originally known as the MTV Video Music Awards Latin America (VMALA), were the Latin American edition of the MTV Video Music Awards. The show debuted on MTV Latin America in 2002 under its original name. In subsequent years, it was rebranded as Los Premios MTV ("The MTV Awards"), though it continued to be referred to internationally as the MTV Latin America Awards.

The awards were created to celebrate the most notable musicians and music videos in Latin America. They were presented annually and broadcast live on MTV Networks Latin America. Winners received a trophy known as the lengua ("tongue"), a stylized tongue-shaped statue. According to the network, the design represented the Spanish-language as the cultural thread that unites Latin America.

From 2002 to 2004, all ceremonies were held in Miami, Florida. The 2005 edition was scheduled to take place in Latin America for the first time, but was ultimately cancelled (see below). The 2006 ceremony, held in Mexico City, became the first to be successfully celebrated in the region. The awards were discontinued in 2010 and later succeeded by the MTV Millennial Awards (MTV MIAW) in 2013.

== History ==
Created in 2002, the VMALAs were held in the Jackie Gleason Theatre in Miami Beach, Florida until 2004. Sylvia Villagran was the live announcer. In 2005 the awards were to be held Wednesday, October 19 at the Xcaret Park's Great Tlachco Theater in Playa del Carmen (close to Cancún), Quintana Roo, Mexico, for the first time in a different location since their creation. However, due to the approach of Hurricane Wilma towards the Mexican Riviera Maya, the show was moved from October 20 to the 19th, but it was eventually postponed. The date was then moved again, this time to December 22. A couple of months later, MTV decided that it was not feasible to have the show on the aforementioned scheduled date. Instead, the awards were given out on a 1/2 hour special where the winners received their awards after having practical jokes played on them (in a Punk'd style). Would-be hosts Molotov hosted this special and played live on a public concert in Playa del Carmen. Another special aired that same day with some of the winners performing. Miranda! played from their studio in Argentina. Two songs from Juanes's concert in Buenos Aires were also filmed by MTV for this special, and Panda and Reik also performed from MTV's studios in Mexico City. Another half-hour special was broadcast that day showing how the show was supposed to happen and the reaction of the artists and MTV's workers after they found out about its cancellation. The 2005 edition would have included performances by Shakira, Sean Paul, My Chemical Romance, Foo Fighters, Ricky Martin, Simple Plan, Miranda!, Babasónicos, Belinda, and Good Charlotte.

On July 21 MTV Latin America announced that the 2006 ceremonies would be held on 19 October 2006 in Palacio de los Deportes indoor arena in Mexico City. Also, MTV announced that the name of the awards would be changed from Video Music Awards Latin America to Premios MTV Latinoamérica (MTV Awards Latin America). The nominees for this year's awards were announced on September 4, introducing 3 new categories: Promising Artist, Breakthrough Artist, and Song of the Year (the only category with nominees in both English and Spanish). Also, Best Solo Artist again replaced Best Male and Female, while the award for Best International Hip-Hop/R&B Artist will not be handed out. It also appeared that the ceremony returned in style after the previous year's ceremony was cancelled in 2005 due to Hurricane Wilma and all of the presenters for the 2006 ceremony apologized to viewers during the broadcast for such, and, for the first time, viewers would be able to vote for the Best Independent Artist award, but a few days later, the category was taken completely off the voting list, which meant that its inclusion on it was an error by MTV. Also, MTV Tres will be handing out for the first time ever its own Viewer's Choice Award during their U.S. simulcast of the event. The following years the event was held in Mexico too (Mexico City in 2007 and Guadalajara, Jalisco in 2008).

In 2009 the event was held in three cities in different dates (September 30 in Buenos Aires, Argentina; October 5 in Mexico City, Mexico; October 11 in Bogotá, Colombia) and broadcast live in Los Angeles on October 15. In 2010 the awards were permanently cancelled and replaced by the MTV World Stage Mexico.

== Host cities ==
Year	Date	Host city	Venue	Host(s)
2002	October 24	Miami Beach, United States	Jackie Gleason Theatre	Diego Luna and Mario Pergolini
2003	October 23	Miami Beach, United States	Jackie Gleason Theatre	Diego Luna
2004	October 21	Miami Beach, United States	Jackie Gleason Theatre	Paulina Rubio
2005	December 22	Playa del Carmen, Mexico	Xcaret Park, Teatro Gran Tlachco	Molotov
2006	October 19	Mexico City, Mexico	Palacio de los Deportes	Molotov and Ana de la Reguera
2007	October 18	Mexico City, Mexico	Palacio de los Deportes	Diego Luna
2008	October 16	Guadalajara, Mexico	Telmex Auditorium	No official host.
2009	October 15			
2009	October 15	Mexico City	Hipódromo de las Américas	Residente and Nelly Furtado
2009	October 15	Buenos Aires, Argentina	Espacio Darwin	Residente and Nelly Furtado
2009	October 15	Bogotá, Colombia	Corferias	Residente and Nelly Furtado
2009	October 15	Los Angeles, United States	Gibson Amphitheatre	Residente and Nelly Furtado
2010–2012	Replaced with MTV World Stage Mexico concerts			
2013	Replaced with MTV Millennial Awards			

== Award categories ==
- Artist of the Year
- Video of the Year
- Song of the Year (2006–2009)
- Best Solo Artist (2003–2004, 2006–2009)
- Best Group or Duet
- Best Pop Artist
- Best Rock Artist
- Best Alternative Artist
- Best Urban Artist (2007, 2009)
- Best Pop Artist — International
- Best Rock Artist — International
- Best New Artist — International
- Best Artist — North
- Best New Artist — North
- Best Artist — Central
- Best New Artist — Central
- Best Artist — South
- Best New Artist — South
- Breakthrough Artist
- "La Zona" Award
- Fashionista — Female
- Fashionista — Male
- Best Fan Club
- Best Video Game Soundtrack
- Best Ringtone
- Best Movie
- Best MTV Tr3́s Artist
- Agent of Change
- MTV Legend

=== Defunct categories ===
- Best Hip-Hop/R&B Artist — International (2004–2005)
- Best Independent Artist
- Promising Artist
- Best Reunion Tour

== Winners and nominees ==
=== MTV VMA International Viewer's Choice Award for MTV Internacional ===
==== 1989 ====
- Chayanne — "Este Ritmo Se Baila Así"
- Emmanuel — "La Última Luna"
- Fito Páez — "Sólo los Chicos"
- Gipsy Kings — "Djobi Djoba"
- Miguel Mateos–ZAS — "Y, sin Pensar"

==== 1990 ====
- Franco De Vita — "Louis"
- Gloria Estefan — "Oye Mi Canto"
- Los Prisioneros — "Tren al Sur"
- Soda Stereo — "En la Ciudad de la Furia"

==== 1991 ====
- Emmanuel — "Bella Señora"
- Franco De Vita — "No Basta"
- Juan Luis Guerra y 440 — "A Pedir Su Mano"
- Los Prisioneros — "Estrechez de Corazón"

==== 1992 ====
- Caifanes — "Nubes"
- El General — "Muévelo"
- El Último de la Fila — "Cuando el Mar Te Tenga"
- Gipsy Kings — "Baila Me"
- Mecano — "El 7 de Septiembre"

==== 1993 ====
- Café Tacuba — "María"
- Juan Luis Guerra y 440 — "El Costo de la Vida"
- Luis Miguel — "América, América"
- Mecano — "Una Rosa Es una Rosa"

=== MTV VMA International Viewer's Choice Award for MTV Latin America ===
==== 1994 ====
- Caifanes — "Afuera"
- Los Fabulosos Cadillacs — "El Matador"
- La Ley — "Tejedores de Ilusión"
- Mano Negra — "El Señor Matanza"

==== 1995 ====
- Café Tacuba — "La Ingrata"
- Fito Páez — "Circo Beat"
- Santana — "Luz Amor y Vida"
- Todos Tus Muertos — "Mate"
- Los Tres — "Déjate Caer"

==== 1996 ====
- Los Fabulosos Cadillacs — "Mal Bicho"
- Illya Kuryaki and the Valderramas — "Abarajame"
- Maldita Vecindad y los Hijos del 5to. Patio — "Don Palabras"
- Eros Ramazzotti — "La Cosa Más Bella"
- Soda Stereo — "Ella Usó Mi Cabeza Como un Revólver"

==== 1997 ====
- Azul Violeta — "Volveré a Empezar"
- Café Tacuba — "Chilanga Banda"
- Control Machete — "¿Comprendes Mendes?
- Fito Páez — "Cadáver Exquisito"
- Aleks Syntek y la Gente Normal — "Sin Ti"

==== 1998 ====
===== North =====
- Aterciopelados — "Cosita Seria"
- Illya Kuryaki and the Valderramas — "Jugo"
- La Ley — "Fotofobia"
- Molotov — "Gimme Tha Power"
- Plastilina Mosh — "Mr. P. Mosh"

===== South =====
- Andrés Calamaro — "Loco"
- Los Fabulosos Cadillacs — "Calaveras y Diablitos"
- Illya Kuryaki and the Valderramas — "Jugo"
- Molotov — "Gimme Tha Power"
- Turf — "Casanova"

==== 1999 ====
===== North =====
- Bersuit Vergarabat — "Sr. Cobranza"
- Café Tacuba — "Revés"
- Control Machete — "Sí, Señor"
- Ricky Martin — "Livin' la Vida Loca"
- Molotov — "El Carnal de las Estrellas"

===== South =====
- Los Auténticos Decadentes — "Los Piratas"
- Ricky Martin — "Livin' la Vida Loca"
- Miguel Mateos — "Bar Imperio"
- Molotov — "El Carnal de las Estrellas"
- Los Pericos — "Sin Cadenas"

==== 2000 ====
===== North =====
- Jumbo — "Siento Que"
- La Ley — "Aquí"
- Mœnia — "Manto Estelar"
- Shakira — "Ojos Así"
- Aleks Syntek — "Tú Necesitas"

===== South =====
- Gustavo Cerati — "Paseo Inmoral"
- Los Fabulosos Cadillacs — "La Vida"
- Illya Kuryaki and the Valderramas — "Coolo"
- Shakira — "Ojos Así"
- Diego Torres — "Donde Van"

==== 2001 ====
===== North =====
- Control Machete — "Amores Perros (featuring Ely Guerra)"
- Genitallica — "Imagina"
- La Ley — "Fuera de Mí"
- Paulina Rubio — "Y Yo Sigo Aquí"
- Alejandro Sanz — "El Alma al Aire"

===== Southwest =====
- Chancho en Piedra — "Eligiendo una Reina"
- Dracma — "Hijo de Puta"
- La Ley — "Fuera de Mí"
- Paulina Rubio — "Y Yo Sigo Aquí"
- Stereo 3 — "Atrévete a Aceptarlo"

===== Southeast =====
- Catupecu Machu — "Y Lo Que Quiero Es Que Pises sin el Suelo"
- Natalia Oreiro — "Tu Veneno"
- Fito Páez — "El Diablo de Tu Corazón"
- Paulina Rubio — "Y Yo Sigo Aquí"
- Alejandro Sanz — "El Alma al Aire"

==== 2002 ====
===== North =====
- Enrique Iglesias — "Héroe"
- Juanes — "A Dios le Pido"
- Jumbo — "Cada Vez Que Me Voy"
- Celso Piña — "Cumbia sobre el Rio (featuring Control Machete and Blanquito Man)"
- Paulina Rubio — "Si Tú Te Vas"
- Shakira — "Suerte"

===== Southwest =====
- Enrique Iglesias — "Héroe"
- Javiera y Los Imposibles — "Maldita Primavera"
- Juanes — "A Dios le Pido"
- Nicole — "Viaje Infinito"
- Stereo 3 — "Amanecer sin Ti"
- Shakira — "Suerte"

===== Southeast =====
- Babasónicos — "El Loco"
- Érica García — "Positiva"
- Enrique Iglesias — "Escapar"
- Juanes — "A Dios le Pido"
- Shakira — "Suerte"
- Diego Torres — "Color Esperanza"

== Records ==
=== Most wins ===
Artist	Awards
Shakira	12
Juanes	9
Panda	8

== MTV Latin America's Regions ==
Like the MTV Europe Music Awards and the MTV Asia Awards, the VMALAs also hand out its regional categories. These regions, however, have been under constant changes and renaming. Here's how each region was perceived year by year:

2002:

- North: Mexico, Central America, Dominican Republic, Venezuela, and Colombia
- Southwest: Chile, Peru, Bolivia, and Ecuador
- Southeast: Argentina, Paraguay, and Uruguay

2003–2009:

- North (Mexico in 2004): Mexico
- Central: Colombia, Chile, Peru, Ecuador, Central America, Dominican Republic, Venezuela and Bolivia
- South (Argentina in 2004): Argentina, Paraguay, Uruguay
