= Los Premios MTV Latinoamérica 2006 =

- Date: October 19, 2006
- Location: Palacio de los Deportes in Mexico City
- Country: Mexico
- Hosted by: Molotov; Ana de la Reguera
- Act(s): Allison; Belanova; Belinda; Calle 13; Daddy Yankee; Evanescence; Julieta Venegas; Kinky; Maná; Miranda!; Nelly Furtado; Panda; Robbie Williams; Shakira

The annual Premios MTV Latinoamérica 2006 took place on October 19, 2006 in Mexico City at Palacio de los Deportes for the first time.

They were the first MTV awards celebrated in Latin America and the ceremony returned in style after last year's awards were cancelled due to Hurricane Wilma approaching to the Riviera Maya and all of the presenters for the 2006 ceremony apologized to viewers during the broadcast for such.

== Nominations ==
Winners in bold.

=== Artist of the Year ===
- Belanova
- **Daddy Yankee**
- Gustavo Cerati
- Julieta Venegas
- La Oreja de Van Gogh

=== Video of the Year ===
- Calle 13 — "Atrévete-te-te"
- Gustavo Cerati — "Crimen"
- Julieta Venegas — "Me Voy"
- **Maná — "Labios Compartidos"**
- Miranda! — "El Profe"

=== Song of the Year ===
- James Blunt — "You're Beautiful"
- Julieta Venegas — "Me Voy"
- Madonna — "Hung Up"
- Maná — "Labios Compartidos"
- **Shakira — "Hips Don't Lie (featuring Wyclef Jean)"**

=== Best Solo Artist ===
- Daddy Yankee
- Diego Torres
- Gustavo Cerati
- **Julieta Venegas**
- Tiziano Ferro

=== Best Group or Duet ===
- Belanova
- La Oreja de Van Gogh
- Maná
- Miranda!
- **Panda**

=== Best Pop Artist ===
- Belanova
- Diego Torres
- Julieta Venegas
- **Kudai**
- La Oreja de Van Gogh

=== Best Rock Artist ===
- Babasónicos
- Bersuit Vergarabat
- Fobia
- Gustavo Cerati
- **Maná**

=== Best Alternative Artist ===
- Calle 13
- División Minúscula
- El Otro Yo
- **Panda**
- Zoé

=== Best Independent Artist ===
- **Charlie 3**
- Chucknorris
- Dani Umpi
- Doctor Krápula
- Finde
- Subdivisión

No public voting

=== Best Pop Artist — International ===
- Ashlee Simpson
- Kelly Clarkson
- Madonna
- Nelly Furtado
- **Robbie Williams**

=== Best Rock Artist — International ===
- AFI
- Coldplay
- **My Chemical Romance**
- Placebo
- Red Hot Chili Peppers

=== Best New Artist — International ===
- Arctic Monkeys
- Fall Out Boy
- **James Blunt**
- Pussycat Dolls
- Rihanna

=== Best Artist — North ===
- Allison
- **Belanova**
- Julieta Venegas
- Maná
- Motel

=== Best New Artist — North ===
- **Allison**
- Chetes
- Diego
- Motel
- Nikki Clan

=== Best Artist — Central ===
- Andrea Echeverri
- **Juanes**
- Kudai
- La Pestilencia
- Líbido

=== Best New Artist — Central ===
- Doctor Krápula
- **Fonseca**
- Ilona
- Jeremías
- Maía

=== Best Artist — South ===
- Airbag
- Árbol
- Babasónicos
- Diego Torres
- **Gustavo Cerati**

=== Best New Artist — South ===
- **Axel**
- Entre Ríos
- Flor
- Migue García
- Nerd Kids

=== MTV Tr3́s Viewer's Choice Award ===
- Daddy Yankee
- **Don Omar**
- Luis Fonsi
- Kumbia Kings
- Ricky Martin

=== Breakthrough Artist ===
- Allison
- Motel
- Kudai
- **Panda**
- Zoé

=== Promising Artist ===
- Axel
- **Calle 13**
- División Minúscula
- Fonseca
- Jesse & Joy

=== MTV Legend Award ===
- **Maná**

== Performances ==
- Shakira — "No"
- Julieta Venegas, Kinky and Daddy Yankee — "Me Voy" / "¿A Dónde Van los Muertos?" / "Eres para Mí"
- Evanescence — "Call Me When You're Sober" / "Bring Me to Life"
- Calle 13 and Nelly Furtado — "Atrévete-te-te" / "Maneater" / "No Hay Igual"
- Belanova — "Por Ti"
- Robbie Williams — "Rudebox" / "Rock DJ"
- Miranda! — "El Profe"
- Panda — "Narcicista por Excelencia"
- Maná — "Labios Compartidos"
- Allison and Belinda — "Frágil" / "Ni Freud, Ni Tu Mamá" / "Hips Don't Lie"

== Appearances ==
- Adrián Dárgelos (from Babasónicos), Manolo Cardona and Calle 13 — presented Best Group or Duet
- Roberto Pettinato — performed a comedy routine and introduced Evanescence
- Álex Ubago, Imanol Landeta and Axel — presented Best Pop Artist
- Diego Luna — presented Song of the Year
- Fall Out Boy — introduced Calle 13
- Reik — introduced Belanova
- Johnny Knoxville, Chris Pontius and Blue Demon Jr. — presented Best Solo Artist
- Belinda and Kudai — introduced Robbie Williams
- Carolina "Pampita" Ardohain and Benjamín Vicuña — introduced Miranda!
- Sofía Zámolo, Naty Botero and Camila Sodi — presented Best Pop Artist—International
- Shakira — introduced Maná and presented them the MTV Legend Award
- Nelly Furtado and Sizu Yantra (Ruben Albarran from Café Tacuba) — presented Artist of the Year

== Memorable Moments ==
- Julieta Venegas forgot the lyrics to her own song "Me Voy" and had to be helped by Kinky's lead singer.
- While Robbie Williams was performing "Rudebox" his drummer lost a drumstick but then he recovered it.
- Robbie Williams mooned the audience and kissed some women from it.
- Robbie Williams, after winning a Lengua, screamed "I would like to put this on your clitoris".
