= Los Premios MTV Latinoamérica 2007 =

- Date: 18 October 2007
- Location: Palacio de los Deportes in Mexico City
- Country: Mexico
- Hosted by: Diego Luna
- Act(s): Thirty Seconds to Mars; Avril Lavigne; Babasónicos; Belinda; División Minúscula; Ely Guerra; Hilary Duff; Jesse & Joy; Juanes; Kudai; Los Concorde; Miranda!; Molotov; Plastilina Mosh; The Cure

The annual Premios MTV Latinoamérica 2007 took place on 18 October 2007 in Mexico City at the Palacio de los Deportes for the second time in a row.

On 25 July 2007 the local government announced they will invest 10 million pesos on the show's planning and that they will have 16 giant screens around the city to broadcast the event live.

There were 3 new categories: Best Urban Artist, Influence Award and Fashionista.

Diego Luna was the host for the third time. He previously co-hosted the 2002 edition and hosted the 2003 edition.

Belinda Peregrin was the most nominated female artist of the year.

Café Tacuba were expected to play live on the show, but one day before the show MTV cancelled their presentation because according to MTV policies they can't have any other activities except for the ones MTV has planned for them in the upcoming week. The band are expected to play on "Las Lunas del Auditorio" on 24 October 2007.

It was announced during the red carpet that 12 million votes were counted for the different categories.

Jose Tillan was the Executive Producer of the event.

== Nominations ==
Winners in bold.

=== Artist of the Year ===
- Belinda
- Babasónicos
- Kudai
- Alejandro Sanz
- **Maná**

=== Video of the Year ===
- Alejandro Sanz – "Te Lo Agradezco, Pero No (featuring Shakira)"
- **Belinda – "Bella Traición"**
- Calle 13 – "Tango del Pecado"
- Gustavo Cerati – "Adiós"
- Maná – "Manda Una Señal"
- Panda – "Los Malaventurados No Lloran"

=== Song of the Year ===
- **Avril Lavigne – "Girlfriend"**
- Enrique Iglesias – "Dímelo"
- Julieta Venegas – "Eres para Mí (featuring Anita Tijoux)"
- Ricky Martin – "Tu Recuerdo (featuring La Mari from Chambao and Tommy Torres)"
- Rihanna – "Umbrella (featuring Jay-Z)"

=== Best Solo Artist ===
- Alejandro Sanz
- **Belinda**
- Daddy Yankee
- Gustavo Cerati
- Paulina Rubio

=== Best Group or Duet ===
- Babasónicos
- Kudai
- **Maná**
- Miranda!
- Panda

=== Best Pop Artist ===
- Alejandro Sanz
- Belinda
- **Julieta Venegas**
- Miranda!
- Paulina Rubio

=== Best Rock Artist ===
- **Babasónicos**
- Bersuit Vergarabat
- Catupecu Machu
- Gustavo Cerati
- Moderatto

=== Best Urban Artist ===
- Anita Tijoux
- Calle 13
- **Daddy Yankee**
- Don Omar
- La Mala Rodríguez

=== Best Alternative Artist ===
- Allison
- División Minúscula
- Kinky
- **Panda**
- Zoé

=== Best Independent Artist ===
- L.E.G.O.
- Los Dynamite
- **No Lo Soporto**
- No Te Va Gustar
- The Hall Effect
- Turbina

No public voting

=== Best Pop Artist – International ===
- **Avril Lavigne**
- Gwen Stefani
- Hilary Duff
- Justin Timberlake
- Rihanna

=== Best Rock Artist – International ===
- Thirty Seconds to Mars
- **Evanescence**
- Maroon 5
- My Chemical Romance
- Panic! at the Disco

=== Best New Artist – International ===
- +44
- Amy Winehouse
- **Fergie**
- Klaxons
- Lily Allen

=== Best Artist – North ===
- Belinda
- **División Minúscula**
- Julieta Venegas
- Paulina Rubio
- Zoé

=== Best New Artist – North ===
- Bengala
- **Camila**
- María José
- Masappan
- Pambo

=== Best Artist – Central ===
- Aterciopelados
- Caramelos de Cianuro
- **Kudai**
- Líbido
- Los Bunkers

=== Best New Artist – Central ===
- Anita Tijoux
- Juan Fernando Velasco
- Naty Botero
- PopCorn
- **Six Pack**

=== Best Artist – South ===
- **Airbag**
- Babasónicos
- Catupecu Machu
- La Vela Puerca
- Miranda!

=== Best New Artist – South ===
- Bicicletas
- **Inmigrantes**
- Ella Es Tan Cargosa
- Las Pastillas del Abuelo
- Pánico Ramírez

=== MTV Tr3́s Viewer's Choice Award – Best Pop Artist ===
- **Aventura**
- Daddy Yankee
- Enrique Iglesias
- Jennifer Lopez
- RKM & Ken-Y

=== MTV Tr3́s Viewer's Choice Award – Best Urban Artist ===
- Calle 13
- Don Omar
- Héctor el Father
- Joell Ortiz
- **Wisin & Yandel**

=== MTV Tr3́s Viewer's Choice Award – Best New Artist ===
- Down AKA Kilo
- Gustavo Laureano
- **Kat DeLuna**
- Notch
- Xtreme

=== Breakthrough Artist ===
- **Camila**
- División Minúscula
- Estelares
- Jesse & Joy
- PopCorn

=== Promising Artist ===
- Bengala
- Inmigrantes
- **La Mala Rodríguez**
- Naif
- No Te Va Gustar

No public voting

=== Fashionista Award – Female ===
- Belinda
- Ely Guerra
- Hilary Duff
- Martha Higareda
- **Paulina Rubio**

=== Fashionista Award – Male ===
- Daddy Yankee
- José "Pepe" Madero (from Panda)
- Juanes
- **Pablo Holman (from Kudai)**
- Wilmer Valderrama

=== "Agent of Change" Award ===
- **Juanes**

=== Influence Award ===
- **The Cure**

== Performances ==
- The Cure – "Friday I'm in Love"
- Juanes – "Me Enamora"
- Avril Lavigne – "When You're Gone" and "Girlfriend"
- Jesse & Joy – "Espacio Sideral"
- Kudai – "Déjame Gritar"
- División Minúscula – "Sognare"
- Thirty Seconds to Mars and Ely Guerra – "From Yesterday"
- Belinda – "Bella Traición"
- Hilary Duff and Plastilina Mosh – "With Love"
- Babasónicos – "El Colmo"
- The Cure – "The End of the World"
- Molotov – "Yofo"
- Los Concorde, Kudai and Miranda! – "De Música Ligera"

== Appearances ==
- Soda Stereo – performed some of "De Música Ligera" and presented Best Group or Duet
- Airbag and Martha Higareda – introduced Avril Lavigne
- RBD – presented Best Pop Artist
- Valeria Gastaldi and Luis Roberto Guzmán – introduced Kudai, Jesse & Joy and División Minúscula
- Nicole Neumann – presented Best Rock Artist
- Panda and Dalma Maradona – introduced Thirty Seconds to Mars
- Luisana Lopilato and Valerie Domínguez – introduced Belinda
- Paulina Rubio and Wilmer Valderrama – presented Song of the Year
- Miranda! and Belanova – introduced Babasónicos
- Avril Lavigne and Thirty Seconds to Mars – presented Video of the Year
- Beto Cuevas – presented the Influence Award
- Julieta Venegas and Hilary Duff – introduced Molotov
- Álex Lora – presented Artist of the Year

== Memorable moments ==
- One day before the show, MTV cancelled Café Tacuba's performance, one of the most expected and publicised. According to MTV's policies, acts can't have any other activities except the ones MTV had planned for them for the week after the show, and Café Tacuba had already booked a performance for "Las Lunas del Auditorio" on 24 October 2007.
- There was a power blackout during the show, just before the live performance of Hilary Duff.
- RBD, Maná, Paulina Rubio and Belinda were booed by the audience when they appeared on stage to present an award or perform.
