= MTV Video Music Awards Latinoamérica 2005 =

Latino MTV music video award ceremony

- Date: ~~October 20, 2005~~; ~~October 19, 2005~~; December 22, 2005 (special show)
- Location: Teatro Gran Tlachco in Xcaret, Playa del Carmen
- Country: Mexico
- Hosted by: Molotov
- Acts: ~~Babasónicos~~; ~~Belanova~~; ~~Belinda~~; ~~Foo Fighters~~; ~~Good Charlotte~~; ~~Gustavo Cerati~~; Juanes; Miranda!; ~~Moderatto~~; Molotov; ~~My Chemical Romance~~; Panda; ~~Sean Paul~~; Reik; ~~Ricky Martin~~; ~~Shakira~~; ~~Simple Plan~~

The annual MTV Videos Music Awards Latinoamérica were to be held Wednesday, October 19 at the Xcaret Park's Great Tlachco Theater in Playa del Carmen (close to Cancún), Quintana Roo, Mexico, for the first time in a different location since their creation. However, due to the approach of Hurricane Wilma towards the Mexican Riviera Maya, the show was moved from October 20 to the 19th, but it was eventually postponed. The date was then moved again, this time to December 22.

A couple of months later, MTV decided that it was not feasible to have the show on the aforementioned scheduled date. Instead, the awards were given out on a half-hour special called "Por Fin Los Premios MTV 2005" where the winners received their awards after having practical jokes played on them (a la Punk'd). Would-be hosts Molotov hosted this special and played live on a public concert in Playa del Carmen. A second special, called "Lenguas en Vivo: Ganadores en Concierto" (Tongues Live: Winners in Concert) aired that same day with some of the winners performing. Miranda! played from their studio in Argentina, two songs from Juanes's concert in Buenos Aires were also filmed by MTV for this special, and Panda and Reik also performed from MTV's studios in Mexico City. A third and final 1/2 hour special called "El Show que Wilma se Voló" was also broadcast that day showing how the show was supposed to happen and the reaction of the artists and MTV's workers after they found out about its cancellation.

== Nominations ==
Winners in bold.

=== Artist of the Year ===
- Café Tacuba
- Diego Torres
- Juanes
- Miranda!
- **Shakira**

=== Video of the Year ===
- Juanes — "La Camisa Negra"
- Miranda! — "Don"
- Molotov — "Amateur"
- **Shakira — "La Tortura (featuring Alejandro Sanz)"**
- Shakira — "No"

=== Best Male Artist ===
- Alejandro Sanz
- Daddy Yankee
- Diego Torres
- **Juanes**
- Tiziano Ferro

=== Best Female Artist ===
- Andrea Echeverri
- Belinda
- Ely Guerra
- Paulina Rubio
- **Shakira**

=== Best Group or Duet ===
- Café Tacuba
- La Ley
- Miranda!
- Molotov
- **Reik**

=== Best Pop Artist ===
- Belinda
- Diego Torres
- Julieta Venegas
- Reik
- **Shakira**

=== Best Rock Artist ===
- Babasónicos
- Catupecu Machu
- **Juanes**
- Lucybell
- Moderatto

=== Best Alternative Artist ===
- Andrea Echeverri
- Belanova
- **Miranda!**
- Molotov
- Natalia y La Forquetina

=== Best Independent Artist ===
- La Etnnia
- Los Natas
- **Panda**
- Pornois
- Thermo

No public voting

=== Best Pop Artist — International ===
- Ashlee Simpson
- Backstreet Boys
- **Gwen Stefani**
- Hilary Duff
- Kelly Clarkson

=== Best Rock Artist — International ===
- Coldplay
- Foo Fighters
- Good Charlotte
- **Green Day**
- Simple Plan

=== Best Hip-Hop/R&B Artist — International ===
- 50 Cent
- Beastie Boys
- **The Black Eyed Peas**
- Missy Elliott
- Eminem

=== Best New Artist — International ===
- Ashlee Simpson
- Gwen Stefani
- Kelly Clarkson
- **My Chemical Romance**
- The Killers

=== Best Artist — North ===
- Belanova
- Café Tacuba
- Moderatto
- Molotov
- **Reik**

=== Best New Artist — North ===
- Delux
- Elli Noise
- Mariana Ochoa
- **Reik**
- Thermo

=== Best Artist — Central ===
- Andrea Echeverri
- Juanes
- Kudai
- La Ley
- **Shakira**

=== Best New Artist — Central ===
- **Andrea Echeverri**
- Ciudad Satélite
- La Etnnia
- Kudai
- Los Píxel

=== Best Artist — South ===
- Árbol
- Babasónicos
- Bersuit Vergarabat
- Catupecu Machu
- **Miranda!**

=== Best New Artist — South ===
- **Bahiano**
- Cuentos Borgeanos
- Flavio y La Mandiga
- Lourdes
- Luciano Supervielle

== Performances ==
=== Por Fin Los Premios MTV 2005 ===
- Molotov — "Mamar"

=== Lenguas en Vivo: Ganadores en Concierto ===
- Reik — "Que Vida La Mía" and "Yo Quisiera"
- Miranda! — "Don"
- Panda — "Cita En El Quirófano"
- Juanes — "La Camisa Negra" and "Dámelo"

== Memorable Moments ==
- The show being postponed twice and finally cancelled (due to the approach of Hurricane Wilma).
