= MTV Video Music Awards Latinoamérica 2003 =

- Date: October 23, 2003
- Location: Jackie Gleason Theater in Miami
- Country: United States
- Hosted by: Diego Luna
- Preshow hosts: Catupecu Machu; Elan; Kevin Johansen; Líbido; Qbo
- Acts: Alejandro Sanz; Alex Lora; Andrea Echeverri; Charly Alberti; Control Machete; Dido; Ely Guerra; Gustavo Cerati; Iggy Pop; Jorge González; Juanes; Korn; La Ley; Natalia Lafourcade; Plastilina Mosh; Sum 41; The Mars Volta; Vicentico

The second annual MTV Video Music Awards Latinoamérica 2003 took place on October 23, 2003, in Miami at the Jackie Gleason Theater for the second time in a row.

Diego Luna hosted the awards alone for the first time. He previously co-hosted the 2002 edition.

== Nominations ==
Winners in bold.

=== Artist of the Year ===
- Café Tacuba
- **Juanes**
- La Ley
- Maná
- Molotov
- Natalia Lafourcade

=== Video of the Year ===
- Café Tacuba — "EO (El Sonidero)"
- Gustavo Cerati — "Cosas Imposibles"
- Juanes — "Fotografía (featuring Nelly Furtado)"
- La Ley — "Ámate y Sálvate"
- **Molotov — "Frijolero"**

=== Best Solo Artist ===
- Diego Torres
- Gustavo Cerati
- **Natalia Lafourcade**
- Ricky Martin
- Vicentico

=== Best Group or Duet ===
- Café Tacuba
- La Ley
- La Oreja de Van Gogh
- Maná
- **Molotov**

=== Best Pop Artist ===
- Diego Torres
- **Natalia Lafourcade**
- Paulina Rubio
- Ricky Martin
- Thalía

=== Best Rock Artist ===
- Gustavo Cerati
- Jaguares
- **Juanes**
- La Ley
- Maná

=== Best Alternative Artist ===
- Café Tacuba
- El Otro Yo
- Kinky
- **Molotov**
- Plastilina Mosh

=== Best Independent Artist ===
- **Hermanos Brothers**
- Miranda!
- Panda
- Totus Toss
- Volován

No public voting

=== Best Pop Artist — International ===
- **Avril Lavigne**
- Christina Aguilera
- Justin Timberlake
- Madonna
- Robbie Williams

=== Best Rock Artist — International ===
- Audioslave
- **Coldplay**
- Evanescence
- Linkin Park
- Radiohead

=== Best New Artist — International ===
- Audioslave
- Beyoncé
- **Evanescence**
- t.A.T.u.
- The White Stripes

=== Best Artist — Mexico ===
- Café Tacuba
- Maná
- Mœnia
- **Molotov**
- Natalia Lafourcade

=== Best New Artist — Mexico ===
- Cartel de Santa
- Inspector
- **Natalia Lafourcade**
- Panteón Rococó
- Qbo

=== Best Artist — Central ===
- Aterciopelados
- Juanes
- La Ley
- **Líbido**
- Los Prisioneros

=== Best New Artist — Central ===
- Coni Lewin
- Marciano
- Pettinellis
- **TK**
- Zen

=== Best Artist — Argentina ===
- Babasónicos
- **Bersuit Vergarabat**
- Gustavo Cerati
- Kevin Johansen
- Vicentico

=== Best New Artist — Argentina ===
- Carajo
- Emme
- Kevin Johansen
- Miranda!
- **Vicentico**

== Performances ==
=== Pre-show ===
- Elán — "Midnight"
- Kevin Johansen — "Sur o No Sur"
- Qbo — "No Más"
- Líbido — "Frágil"
- Catupecu Machu — "Y Lo Que Quiero Es Que Pises sin el Suelo"

=== Main show ===
- Álex Lora, Andrea Echeverri, Charly Alberti, Jorge González, Juanes, Plastilina Mosh, Ricky Martin and Vicentico as "Los Black Stripes" — "We Are South American Rockers" / "Bolero Falaz" / "Gimme Tha Power" / "Livin' la Vida Loca" / "El Matador"
- Alejandro Sanz — "No Es Lo Mismo "
- Korn — "Right Now"
- La Ley and Ely Guerra — "Ámate y Sálvate" and "El Duelo"
- Dido — "White Flag"
- Café Tacuba — "Eres" and "Cero y Uno"
- The Mars Volta — "Drunkship of Lanterns"
- Gustavo Cerati — "Artefacto"
- Natalia Lafourcade and Control Machete — "En el 2000" and "Bien, Bien"
- Iggy Pop and Sum 41 — "Little Know It All" and "Lust for Life"

== Appearances ==
- Madonna — introduced the audience to the show
- Britney Spears, Erik Estrada, Daisy Fuentes, Iggy Pop and Sum 41 — appeared in the opening sketch
- Diego Maradona — appeared during Diego Luna's opening monologue
- Álex Lora, Juanes and Charly Alberti — presented Best Group or Duet
- Andrea Echeverri and Dido — introduced Alejandro Sanz
- Patricia Velásquez and Sum 41 — presented Best Pop Artist
- Maná (Fher, Alex and Sergio) — presented Best Rock Artist—International
- Daniela Cicarelli, Amelia Vega and Elsa Benítez — presented Best Rock Artist
- Kelly Osbourne and Molotov — introduced Korn
- Catupecu Machu and Leticia Bredice — presented Best New Artist—Argentina
- La Oreja de Van Gogh (Amaia and Pablo) and Mœnia (Alfonso and "Midi") — introduced La Ley
- Elan and María Jimena Pereyra — introduced Dido
- Sofía Mulánovich, Chris Pontius, Steve-O and Manny Puig — presented Best Artist—Central
- Gustavo Cerati — introduced Café Tacuba
- Daisy Fuentes and Deborah Ombres — presented Best Solo Artist
- Zack de la Rocha — introduced The Mars Volta
- The cast of Dirty Sanchez and Fabiola Campomanes — presented Best Alternative Artist
- Natalia Lafourcade and Kinky (Gil and Ulises) — introduced Gustavo Cerati
- Martha Higareda and Alfonso Herrera — introduced Natalia Lafourcade
- Diego Torres, Esther Cañadas and Robi Rosa — presented Video of the Year
- Alejandro Sanz — presented Artist of the Year
