= MTV Video Music Awards Latinoamérica 2002 =

2002 music awards ceremony

- Date: October 24, 2002
- Location: Jackie Gleason Theater in Miami
- Country: United States
- Hosted by: Diego Luna; Mario Pergolini
- Acts: Álvaro Henríquez; Avril Lavigne; Café Tacuba; Carlos Santana; Diego Torres; Ely Guerra; Erica García; Javiera Parra; Juanes; Kinky; Maná; Michelle Branch; Molotov; Paulina Rubio; Shakira; System of a Down

The first annual MTV Video Music Awards Latinoamérica 2002 took place on October 24, 2002, in Miami at the Jackie Gleason Theater.

== Nominations ==
Winners in bold.

=== Artist of the Year ===
- Alejandro Sanz
- Diego Torres
- Juanes
- La Ley
- **Shakira**

=== Video of the Year ===
- Diego Torres — "Color Esperanza"
- Enrique Iglesias — "Héroe"
- Juanes — "A Dios le Pido"
- Paulina Rubio — "Si Tú Te Vas"
- **Shakira — "Suerte"**

=== Best Male Artist ===
- Alejandro Sanz
- Diego Torres
- Enrique Iglesias
- Gustavo Cerati
- **Juanes**

=== Best Female Artist ===
- Ely Guerra
- Érica García
- Paulina Rubio
- **Shakira**
- Thalía

=== Best Group or Duet ===
- Babasónicos
- Catupecu Machu
- Kinky
- **La Ley**
- La Oreja de Van Gogh

=== Best Pop Artist ===
- Alejandro Sanz
- Diego Torres
- Enrique Iglesias
- Paulina Rubio
- **Shakira**

=== Best Rock Artist ===
- Aterciopelados
- Babasónicos
- Catupecu Machu
- Juanes
- **La Ley**

=== Best Alternative Artist ===
- Celso Piña
- Ely Guerra
- Enrique Bunbury
- Kinky
- **Manu Chao**

=== Best Pop Artist — International ===
- Avril Lavigne
- Britney Spears
- Kylie Minogue
- Nelly Furtado
- **Pink**

=== Best Rock Artist — International ===
- Coldplay
- Linkin Park
- No Doubt
- **Red Hot Chili Peppers**
- System of a Down

=== Best New Artist — International ===
- **Avril Lavigne**
- Gorillaz
- Linkin Park
- Nelly Furtado
- System of a Down

=== Best Artist — North ===
- Aleks Syntek
- Juanes
- Kinky
- Paulina Rubio
- **Shakira**

=== Best New Artist — North ===
- Cabas
- Celso Piña
- Kinky
- **Sin Bandera**
- Volován

=== Best Artist — Southwest ===
- Javiera y Los Imposibles
- La Ley
- **Líbido**
- Los Bunkers
- Los Prisioneros

=== Best New Artist — Southwest ===
- **DJ Méndez**
- Los Bunkers
- Mamma Soul
- No Me Acuerdo
- Sinergia

=== Best Artist — Southeast ===
- Babasónicos
- Bersuit Vergarabat
- Catupecu Machu
- **Diego Torres**
- Gustavo Cerati

=== Best New Artist — Southeast ===
- **Bandana**
- Daniela Herrero
- Jorge Drexler
- Leo García
- Parraleños

=== MTV Legend Award ===
- **Soda Stereo**

== Performances ==
- Santana and Michelle Branch — "The Game of Love"
- Molotov and Juanes — "Here Comes the Mayo" / "Mala Gente"
- Avril Lavigne — "Complicated"
- Shakira — "Inevitable"
- Maná — "Ángel de Amor"
- System of a Down — "Chop Suey!"
- Café Tacuba, Álvaro Henríquez, Javiera Parra, Ely Guerra and Érica García — "Olor a Gas"
- Diego Torres — "Color Esperanza"
- Kinky and Paulina Rubio — "Más" / "I Was Made for Lovin' You"

== Appearances ==
- The Rolling Stones — introduced the audience to the show and introduced Santana and Michelle Branch
- Juanes and Diego Torres — presented Best Female Artist
- Johnny Knoxville, Jason Acuña and Ryan Dunn — presented Best Rock Artist
- Paulina Rubio — introduced Molotov
- Anastacia, Enrique Bunbury and Dante Spinetta — presented Best New Artist—International
- Álex Lora, Ricardo Mollo and Jorge González — presented Video of the Year
- Nick Carter (from the Backstreet Boys) and Fey — introduced Avril Lavigne
- Yamila Díaz-Rahi, Liliana Domínguez and Roselyn Sánchez — presented Best Rock Artist—International
- Julio Iglesias Jr. and Bandana — introduced Shakira
- Natalia Oreiro and Ruth Infarinato — presented Best Artist—Southeast
- Avril Lavigne, Aleks Syntek and Facundo Gómez — presented Best Group or Duet
- Carlos Santana — introduced Maná
- Jaime Bayly, Angie Cepeda and Sofía Vergara — presented Best Artist—Southwest
- Adrián Dárgelos (from Babasónicos) and Cabas — presented Best Pop Artist—International
- Iggy Pop and Dolores Barreiro — introduced System of a Down
- Mario Pergolini — presented MTV Legend Award
- Andrea Echeverri and Héctor Buitrago (from Aterciopelados) — introduced Café Tacuba, Álvaro Henríquez, Javiera Parra, Ely Guerra and Érica García
- Javiera Parra (from Javiera y Los Imposibles) and Ely Guerra — introduced Diego Torres
- Howie Dorough (from the Backstreet Boys), Yolanda Andrade and Montserrat Olivier — presented Best Male Artist
- Maná — presented Artist of the Year
