= MTV Video Music Awards Latinoamérica 2004 =

- Date: October 21, 2004
- Location: Jackie Gleason Theater in Miami
- Country: United States
- Hosted by: Paulina Rubio
- Act(s): Alex Ubago; Beastie Boys; The Black Eyed Peas; Cartel de Santa; Diego Torres; DJ Toy; Juanes; Julieta Venegas; La Ley; Lenny Kravitz; Paulina Rubio; Pitbull; The Rasmus; Tiziano Ferro

The annual MTV Video Music Awards Latinoamérica 2004 took place on October 21, 2004 in Miami at the Jackie Gleason Theater for the third time in a row.

Paulina Rubio was the first woman to host the awards.

== Nominations ==
Winners in bold.

=== Artist of the Year ===
- Alejandro Sanz
- Café Tacuba
- Diego Torres
- **Julieta Venegas**
- La Oreja de Van Gogh

=== Video of the Year ===
- Alejandro Sanz — "No Es Lo Mismo"
- Babasónicos — "Putita"
- **Café Tacuba — "Eres"**
- Julieta Venegas — "Andar Conmigo"
- Molotov — "Hit Me"

=== Best Solo Artist ===
- Alejandro Sanz
- Álex Ubago
- Diego Torres
- **Julieta Venegas**
- Tiziano Ferro

=== Best Group or Duet ===
- Babasónicos
- Café Tacuba
- Cartel de Santa
- La Ley
- **La Oreja de Van Gogh**

=== Best Pop Artist ===
- **Alejandro Sanz**
- Álex Ubago
- Diego Torres
- Julieta Venegas
- Paulina Rubio

=== Best Rock Artist ===
- Babasónicos
- Bersuit Vergarabat
- Fobia
- **La Ley**
- Vicentico

=== Best Alternative Artist ===
- **Café Tacuba**
- Cartel de Santa
- Control Machete
- Kinky
- Miranda!

=== Best Independent Artist ===
- **Capri**
- Los Látigos
- Pornomotora
- Telefunka
- Tolidos

No public voting

=== Best Pop Artist — International ===
- **Avril Lavigne**
- Beyoncé
- Hilary Duff
- Joss Stone
- Nelly Furtado

=== Best Rock Artist — International ===
- Blink 182
- Evanescence
- **Maroon 5**
- No Doubt
- The Rasmus

=== Best Hip-Hop/R&B Artist — International ===
- 50 Cent
- Beastie Boys
- **The Black Eyed Peas**
- Outkast
- Usher

=== Best New Artist — International ===
- Franz Ferdinand
- Joss Stone
- **Maroon 5**
- The Rasmus
- Yellowcard

=== Best Artist — Mexico ===
- Aleks Syntek
- Belinda
- Café Tacuba
- Cartel de Santa
- **Julieta Venegas**

=== Best New Artist — Mexico ===
- **Belinda**
- Kalimba
- La 5ª Estación *
- Lu
- María Barracuda

*La 5ª Estación originated in Spain but it's considered a Mexican band as they were launched there

=== Best Artist — Central ===
- Cabas
- La Ley
- Los Bunkers
- Lucybell
- **TK**

=== Best New Artist — Central ===
- **Cementerio Club**
- De Saloon
- Lulu Jam
- Pali
- Pornomotora

=== Best Artist — Argentina ===
- Babasónicos
- Bersuit Vergarabat
- Catupecu Machu
- **Diego Torres**
- Vicentico

=== Best New Artist — Argentina ===
- **Airbag**
- Callejeros
- Capri
- Gazpacho
- Leticia Brédice

== Performances ==
- Diego Torres, La Ley and Julieta Venegas — "Yeah!" / "Hey Ya!" / "Hey Mama"
- The Black Eyed Peas — "Let's Get It Started"
- The Rasmus — "Guilty"
- Alex Ubago — "Aunque No Te Pueda Ver"
- Tiziano Ferro — "Tardes Negras"
- Juanes — "Nada Valgo Sin Tu Amor"
- Julieta Venegas and Cartel de Santa — "Lento"
- Lenny Kravitz — "Calling All Angels"
- Paulina Rubio, DJ Toy and Pitbull — "Dame Otro Tequila" / "Culo"
- Molotov — "Amateur" and "Gimme Tha Power"
- Beastie Boys — "Ch-Check It Out" and "Sabotage"

== Appearances ==
- Bono — introduced the audience to the show
- Molotov — presented Best Solo Artist
- La Ley — introduced The Rasmus
- Belinda and Natalia Lafourcade — introduced Alex Ubago and Tiziano Ferro
- Adrián and Marcelo (from Babasónicos) and Pirry — introduced Juanes
- Xzibit, Silvina Luna, María Eugenia Ritó and Rocío Guirao Díaz — presented Best Hip-Hop/R&B Artist—International
- Benjamín Vicuña, Kalimba and Ana de la Reguera — introduced Julieta Venegas and Cartel de Santa
- Miguel Rodarte and Nicole Neumann — presented Best Rock Artist
- Shakira — introduced Lenny Kravitz
- Diego Torres — introduced Paulina Rubio and Pitbull
- Gastón Pauls and Florencia de la V — presented Best Artist—Argentina
- Leticia Brédice — introduced Molotov
- Lenny Kravitz — presented Artist of the Year

== Memorable Moments ==
- Host Paulina Rubio showed her behind.
