= Los Premios MTV Latinoamérica 2009 =

- Date: September 30, 2009; October 5, 2009; October 11, 2009; October 15, 2009
- Location: Espacio Darwin in Buenos Aires, Hipódromo de las Américas in Mexico City, Corferias in Bogotá, Gibson Amphitheatre in Los Angeles
- Country: Argentina; Mexico; Colombia; United States
- Hosted by: Residente; Nelly Furtado; Announcer: Sylvia Villagran
- Acts: 50 Cent; Alejandro Sanz; Ashley Tisdale; Cobra Starship; David Guetta; Diva Gash; Doctor Krápula; Fall Out Boy; Fanny Lu; Jesse & Joy; Kelly Rowland; Miranda!; Nelly Furtado; Pablo Lescano; Panda; Paulina Rubio; Placebo; Shakira; Sussie 4; The Veronicas; Wisin & Yandel; Zuker

The eighth annual Premios MTV Latinoamérica 2009 took place on October 15, 2009 in Bogotá, Colombia at Corferias, at the Gibson Amphitheatre in Los Angeles, United States, Mexico City, Mexico and Buenos Aires, Argentina.

René Pérez Joglar, also known as Residente from Calle 13, alongside pop singer Nelly Furtado served as the hosts. Sylvia Villagran was the announcer for the show.

Regional awards were given out on special events recorded prior to the main show to be held on October 15 at the Gibson Amphitheatre in Los Angeles. Buenos Aires was the first city to host this year's event. Miranda! and Pablo Lescano performed at Espacio Darwin on September 30. The Hipódromo de las Américas at Mexico City was the second venue to host the regional event on October 5. Jesse & Joy, Panda and Placebo performed. The next city to host the regional event was Bogotá at Corferias on October 11. Alejandro Sanz, Doctor Krápula, Fanny Lu, Shakira and The Veronicas performed.

Jose Tillan was the Executive Producer of the event. This was the final installment of the Latin American MTV Awards before being canceled since 2010 and replaced with MTV World Stage concerts in Mexico.

== Nominations ==
Winners are in bold text.

=== Artist of the Year ===
- Kudai
- Paulina Rubio
- **Wisin & Yandel**
- Ximena Sariñana
- Zoé

=== Video of the Year ===
- Calle 13 — "Electro Movimiento"
- Nelly Furtado — "Manos al Aire"
- Paulina Rubio — "Causa y Efecto"
- Shakira — "Loba"
- **Wisin & Yandel — "Abusadora"**

=== Song of the Year ===
- Kings of Leon — "Use Somebody"
- **Lady Gaga — "Poker Face"**
- Nelly Furtado — "Manos al Aire"
- Shakira — "Loba"
- Wisin & Yandel — "Abusadora"

=== Best Solo Artist ===
- Andrés Calamaro
- Beto Cuevas
- Daddy Yankee
- **Paulina Rubio**
- Ximena Sariñana

=== Best Group or Duet ===
- Calle 13
- Jesse & Joy
- **Panda**
- Wisin & Yandel
- Zoé

=== Best Pop Artist ===
- Fanny Lu
- Jesse & Joy
- Miranda!
- Paulina Rubio
- **Reik**

=== Best Rock Artist ===
- Andrés Calamaro
- Los Fabulosos Cadillacs
- Moderatto
- Motel
- **Zoé**

=== Best Alternative Artist ===
- Austin TV
- División Minúscula
- Kinky
- **Panda**
- Plastilina Mosh

=== Best Urban Artist ===
- **Calle 13**
- Cartel de Santa
- Daddy Yankee
- Dante
- Wisin & Yandel

=== Best Pop Artist — International ===
- Britney Spears
- **Jonas Brothers**
- Lady Gaga
- Miley Cyrus
- Taylor Swift

=== Best Rock Artist — International ===
- Coldplay
- Fall Out Boy
- **Green Day**
- Linkin Park
- Metallica

=== Best New Artist — International ===
- Ashley Tisdale
- **Lady Gaga**
- McFly
- Taylor Swift
- The Veronicas

=== Best Artist — North ===
- Jesse & Joy
- **Panda**
- Paulina Rubio
- Ximena Sariñana
- Zoé

=== Best New Artist — North ===
- Hello Seahorse!
- Jotdog
- **Paty Cantú**
- Sandoval
- Tush

=== Best Artist — Central ===
- Aterciopelados
- Doctor Krápula
- **Don Tetto**
- Fanny Lu
- Kudai

=== Best New Artist — Central ===
- **Ádammo**
- Bomba Estéreo
- El Sie7e
- Nicole Natalino
- Zaturno

=== Best Artist — South ===
- Andrés Calamaro
- Babasónicos
- Infierno 18
- Los Fabulosos Cadillacs
- **Miranda!**

=== Best New Artist — South ===
- Banda de Turistas
- F-A
- **Loli Molina**
- Onda Vaga
- Walter Domínguez

=== Best MTV Tr3́s Artist ===
- **Aventura**
- Calle 13
- Pitbull
- Tito El Bambino
- Wisin & Yandel

=== Best New MTV Tr3́s Artist ===
- **Da' Zoo**
- Franco "El Gorila"
- Jazmín López
- Marcy Place
- Pee Wee

=== Breakthrough Artist ===
- Ádammo
- Fanny Lu
- Massacre
- Paty Cantú
- **Sonohra**

=== "La Zona" Award ===
- Ádammo
- Alika & Nueva Alianza
- Cienfue
- **Hello Seahorse!**
- Los Daniels
- Robot Zonda

No public voting

=== Fashionista Award — Female ===
- Fanny Lu
- **Hayley Williams (from Paramore)**
- Katy Perry
- Miley Cyrus
- Shakira

=== Fashionista Award — Male ===
- Diego Fainello (from Sonohra)
- Gabe Saporta (from Cobra Starship)
- José "Pepe" Madero (from Panda)
- **Nick Jonas (from the Jonas Brothers)**
- Pete Wentz (from Fall Out Boy)

=== Best Fan Club ===
- **Britney Spears (President: Erik Magdaleno)**
- Jonas Brothers (President: Christina Méndez)
- Metallica (President: Jorge Armando Fernández)
- Shakira (President: Dario Castillo)
- Taylor Swift (President: Sue Ann Carol Castro Cipriano)

=== Best Video Game Soundtrack ===
- FIFA 09
- Guitar Hero: Metallica
- Guitar Hero World Tour
- **Rock Band — Green Day Pack**
- Shaun White Snowboarding

=== Best Ringtone ===
- Britney Spears — "Womanizer"
- **Katy Perry — "Hot n Cold"**
- Lady Gaga — "Poker Face"
- Metro Station — "Shake It"
- Wisin & Yandel — "Abusadora"

=== Best Movie ===
- Transformers: Revenge of the Fallen
- **Twilight**

=== Best Live Performance at "Los Premios 2009" ===
- Alejandro Sanz — "Looking for Paradise"
- Ashley Tisdale — "It's Alright, It's OK"
- **Cobra Starship and Paulina Rubio — "Good Girls Go Bad"/"Ni Rosas Ni Juguetes"**
- David Guetta and Kelly Rowland — "When Love Takes Over"
- Fall Out Boy — "I Don't Care"
- Jesse & Joy — "Adiós"
- Nelly Furtado — "Manos al Aire"
- Panda — "Sólo a Terceros"
- Placebo — "Ashtray Heart"
- Shakira — "Loba"
- The Veronicas — "Untouched"
- Wisin & Yandel and 50 Cent — "Mujeres in the Club"

=== Agent of Change ===
- **Shakira**

=== MTV Legend Award ===
- **Café Tacuba**

== Performances ==
=== Buenos Aires ===
- Miranda! — "Es Imposible!", "Hola", "Perfecta", "Yo Te Diré", "Lo Que Siento por Tí", "Mentía", "Enamorada", "El Profe" and "Don" (featuring Pablo Lescano)
- Zuker — DJed at the end of the Buenos Aires event

=== Mexico City ===
- Jesse & Joy — "Adiós", "Si te Vas", "Volveré", "Chocolate", "Electricidad", "Ya no Quiero" and "Espacio Sideral"
- Panda — "Sólo a Terceros", "Cita en el Quirófano", "Los Malaventurados No Lloran" and "Narcisista por Excelencia
- Placebo — "Ashtray Heart", "For What It's Worth", "Battle for the Sun", "Special Needs", "Special K" and "Every You, Every Me"
- Sussie 4 — DJed at the end of the Mexico City event

=== Bogotá ===
- Alejandro Sanz — "Looking for Paradise" and "Corazón Partío"
- Fanny Lu and Doctor Krápula — "Tú No Eres para Mi"
- Shakira — "Loba"
- The Veronicas — "Untouched", "Everything I'm Not", "Take Me on the Floor" and "4Ever"
- Diva Gash — DJed at the end of the Bogotá event

=== Los Angeles ===
- Nelly Furtado — "Manos Al Aire"
- Cobra Starship and Paulina Rubio — "Good Girls Go Bad"/"Ni Rosas Ni Juguetes"
- Ashley Tisdale — "It's Alright, It's OK"
- Wisin & Yandel and 50 Cent — "Mujeres in the Club"/"Abusadora"
- David Guetta and Kelly Rowland — "When Love Takes Over"
- Fall Out Boy — "I Don't Care"

== Appearances ==
=== Buenos Aires ===
- Fabio Posca and Brenda Asnicar — presented Best New Artist — South
- Mike Amigorena and Déborah de Corral — presented Best Artist — South

=== Mexico City ===
- Motel and Ana Brenda Contreras — introduced Jesse & Joy
- Leonardo de Lozanne and Eiza González — presented Best New Artist — North
- Moderatto and Paola Espinosa — introduced Panda
- Aleks Syntek and Paty Garza — presented Best Artist — North
- Belanova — introduced Placebo

=== Bogotá ===
- Juanes — introduced Alejandro Sanz
- Carlos Vives — presented Agent of Change
- Fonseca — introduced Shakira
- Taliana Vargas and Johanna Carreño — presented Best Artist — Central
- María Gabriela de Faría and Reinaldo Zavarce — introduced The Veronicas (also hosted the event's red carpet pre-show)
- Connie Camelo and CAMO — presented Best New Artist — Central
- Kudai — introduced Doctor Krápula and Fanny Lu

=== Los Angeles ===
- Audrina Patridge and Wilmer Valderrama — presented Best Solo Artist
- Kelly Osbourne and Drake Bell — introduced Cobra Starship
- Snoop Dogg and Anahí — presented Video of the Year
- Backstreet Boys and Jery Sandoval — presented Best Pop Artist
- Dave Navarro and Tommy Lee — presented Best Rock Artist
- Alessandra Ambrosio and Alfonso Herrera — introduced Ashley Tisdale
- Miranda Cosgrove and PeeWee — introduced Wisin & Yandel and 50 Cent
- Selena Gomez and Reik — presented Best Duo or Group
- Ximena Sariñana and Zoé — introduced Morrissey
- Morrissey — presented Legend Award
- Sofia Vergara and 50 Cent — presented Artist of the Year
- Amandititita with the hosts — introduced Fall Out Boy
