= Los Premios MTV Latinoamérica for Best New Artist — Central =

Latino MTV award

This is a list of the Los Premios MTV Latinoamérica winners and nominees for Best New Artist — Central.

Year	Winner	Other nominees
2002	DJ Méndez	Los Bunkers; [Mamma Soul; No Me Acuerdo; Sinergia
2003	TK	Coni Lewin; Marciano; Pettinellis; Zen
2004	Cementerio Club	De Saloon; Lulu Jam; Pali; Pornomotora
2005	Andrea Echeverri	Ciudad Satélite; La Etnnia; Kudai; Los Píxel
2006	Fonseca	Doctor Krápula; Ilona; Jeremías; Maía
2007	Six Pack	Anita Tijoux; Juan Fernando Velasco; Naty Botero; PopCorn
2009	Ádammo	Bomba Estéreo; El Sie7e; Nicole Natalino; Zaturno
