= MTV Europe Music Award for Best Latin America Central Act =

Category of MTV Europe Music Awards

The following is a list of the MTV Europe Music Award winners and nominees for Best Latin America Central Act. This category was almost always won by Colombia, except in 2013 by Anna Carina from Peru, and in 2022 by Danny Ocean from Venezuela.

== Winners and nominees ==
=== 2010s ===
Year	Artist	Nationality	Ref
2012
2012	Don Tetto	Colombia	
2012	Ádammo	Peru	
2012	Caramelos de Cianuro	Venezuela	
2012	Juanes	Colombia	
2012	Naty Botero	Colombia	
2013
2013	Anna Carina	Peru	
2013	Cali & El Dandee	Colombia	
2013	Javiera Mena	Chile	
2013	Maluma	Colombia	
2013	Pescao Vivo	Colombia	
2014
2014	Don Tetto	Colombia	
2014	Alkiados	Colombia	
2014	Mirella Cesa	Ecuador	
2014	J Balvin	Colombia	
2014	Nicolás Mayorca	Colombia	
2015
2015	J Balvin	Colombia	
2015	ChocQuibTown	Colombia	
2015	Javiera Mena	Chile	
2015	Pasabordo	Colombia	
2015	Piso 21	Colombia	
2016
2016	Maluma	Colombia	
2016	Alkilados	Colombia	
2016	J Balvin	Colombia	
2016	Manuel Medrano	Colombia	
2016	Sebastian Yatra	Colombia	
2017
2017	J Balvin	Colombia	
2017	Maluma	Colombia	
2017	Morat	Colombia	
2017	Piso 21	Colombia	
2017	Sebastián Yatra	Colombia	
2018
2018	Sebastián Yatra	Colombia	
2018	J Balvin	Colombia	
2018	Karol G	Colombia	
2018	Maluma	Colombia	
2018	Manuel Turizo	Colombia	
2019
2019	Sebastián Yatra	Colombia	
2019	J Balvin	Colombia	
2019	Maluma	Colombia	
2019	Mau y Ricky	Venezuela	
2019	Piso 21	Colombia	

=== 2020s ===
Year	Artist	Nationality	Ref
2020
2020	Sebastián Yatra	Colombia	
2020	Camilo	Colombia	
2020	J Balvin	Colombia	
2020	Karol G	Colombia	
2020	Maluma	Colombia	
2021
2021	Sebastián Yatra	Colombia	
2021	Camilo	Colombia	
2021	J Balvin	Colombia	
2021	Karol G	Colombia	
2021	Maluma	Colombia	
2022
2022	Danny Ocean	Venezuela	
2022	Karol G	Colombia	
2022	Feid	Colombia	
2022	Manuel Turizo	Colombia	
2022	Camilo	Colombia	
2023
2023	Feid	Colombia	
2023	Blessd	Colombia	
2023	Manuel Turizo	Colombia	
2023	Ryan Castro	Colombia	
2023	Sebastián Yatra	Colombia	
2024
2024	Manuel Turizo	Colombia	
2024	Beéle	Colombia	
2024	Blessd	Colombia	
2024	Kapo	Colombia	
2024	Sofia Castro	Colombia	

== See also ==
- MTV Video Music Award for Best Latin Artist
- MTV VMA International Viewer's Choice Award for MTV Latin America
- MTV VMA International Viewer's Choice Award for MTV Internacional
- Los Premios MTV Latinoamérica
  - Los Premios MTV Latinoamérica for Best Artist — Central
