= Los Premios MTV Latinoamérica for Best Artist — Central =

Latino MTV award

This is a list of the Los Premios MTV Latinoamérica winners and nominees for Best Artist — Central.

Year	Winner	Other nominees
2002	Líbido	Javiera y Los Imposibles; La Ley; Los Bunkers; Los Prisioneros
2003	Líbido	Aterciopelados; Juanes; La Ley; Los Prisioneros
2004	TK	Cabas; La Ley; Los Bunkers; Lucybell
2005	Shakira	Andrea Echeverri; Juanes; Kudai; La Ley
2006	Juanes	Andrea Echeverri; Kudai; La Pestilencia; Líbido
2007	Kudai	Aterciopelados; Caramelos de Cianuro; Líbido; Los Bunkers
2008	Juanes	Doctor Krápula; Don Tetto; Kudai; Los Bunkers
2009	Don Tetto	Aterciopelados; Doctor Krápula; Fanny Lu; Kudai
