= Los Premios MTV Latinoamérica for Best Fan Club =

Latino MTV award

This is a list of the Los Premios MTV Latinoamérica winners and nominees for Best Fan Club.

Year	Winner	Other nominees
2008	Tokio Hotel (President: Fátima Acosta)	Thirty Seconds to Mars (President: Iris Delgado); Babasónicos (President: Juan Laborda); Belanova (President: Luis Nazario); Jonas Brothers (President: Miguel Villa); Kudai (President: Martín Torrilla)
2009	Britney Spears (President: Erik Magdaleno)	Jonas Brothers (President: Christina Méndez); Metallica (President: Jorge Armando Fernández); Shakira (President: Dario Castillo); Taylor Swift (President: Sue Ann Carol Castro Cipriano)
