= 2011 MTV Europe Music Awards =

Annual edition of the awards show

- Date: 6 November 2011 (9:00 PM CET)
- Location: Odyssey Arena, Belfast, Northern Ireland
- Hosted by: Selena Gomez
- Most awards: Lady Gaga (4)
- Most nominations: Lady Gaga (7)

Television/radio coverage
- Network: MTV Networks International (Europe)

The 2011 MTV EMAs (also known as the MTV Europe Music Awards) were held in Northern Ireland's capital Belfast, on Sunday, 6 November 2011, at the Odyssey Arena in the Titanic Quarter area of the city and was hosted by Selena Gomez. Additional live venues for the awards show include Ulster Hall and Belfast City Hall.

On 19 September 2011, MTV Networks International announced the 2011 nominees. The main categories were dominated by Lady Gaga with seven nominations, Katy Perry and Bruno Mars with five and Britney Spears, Thirty Seconds to Mars and Adele with three apiece. Lady Gaga was the biggest winner of the night, taking home 4 awards. Other winners include Thirty Seconds to Mars, Bruno Mars and Justin Bieber with two apiece.

During the show Selena Gomez said that MTV received 154 million votes from people around the globe. Queen received the Global Icon Award from Katy Perry, and the band closed the awards ceremony, with Adam Lambert on vocals, performing "The Show Must Go On", "We Will Rock You" and "We Are the Champions".

== Nominations ==
Winners are in bold text.

Best Song	Best Video
**Lady Gaga — "Born This Way"**: Adele — "Rolling in the Deep"; Bruno Mars — "Grenade"; Jennifer Lopez (featuring Pitbull) — "On the Floor"; Katy Perry — "Firework"	**Lady Gaga — "Born This Way"**: Adele — "Rolling in the Deep"; Beastie Boys — "Make Some Noise"; Beyoncé — "Run the World (Girls)"; Justice — "Civilization"
Best Female	Best Male
**Lady Gaga**: Adele; Beyoncé; Jennifer Lopez; Katy Perry	**Justin Bieber**: Bruno Mars; David Guetta; Eminem; Kanye West
Best New Act	Best Pop
**Bruno Mars**: Far East Movement; Jessie J; LMFAO; Wiz Khalifa	**Justin Bieber**: Britney Spears; Katy Perry; Lady Gaga; Rihanna
Best Rock	Best Alternative
**Linkin Park**: Coldplay; Foo Fighters; Kings of Leon; Red Hot Chili Peppers	**Thirty Seconds to Mars**: Arcade Fire; Arctic Monkeys; My Chemical Romance; The Strokes
Best Hip-Hop	Best Live Act
**Eminem**: Jay-Z & Kanye West; Lil Wayne; Pitbull; Snoop Dogg	**Katy Perry**: Coldplay; Foo Fighters; Lady Gaga; Red Hot Chili Peppers
Best World Stage Performance	Best Push Act
**Thirty Seconds to Mars**: Arcade Fire; Diddy – Dirty Money; Enrique Iglesias; Kings of Leon; Linkin Park; My Chemical Romance; Ozzy Osbourne; Snoop Dogg; The Black Eyed Peas	**Bruno Mars**: Alexis Jordan; Big Time Rush; Far East Movement; Jessie J; Katy B; LMFAO; Neon Trees; Skylar Grey; Theophilus London; Wiz Khalifa
Biggest Fans	Best Worldwide Act
**Lady Gaga**: Justin Bieber; Paramore; Selena Gomez; Thirty Seconds to Mars	**Big Bang**: Abd El Fattah Grini; Britney Spears; Lena; Restart
Voices Award
**Justin Bieber**
Global Icon
**Queen**

== Regional nominations ==
Winners are in bold text.

Best Adria Act	Best Belgian Act
**Dubioza Kolektiv**: Hladno pivo; Magnifico; S.A.R.S.; SevdahBABY	**Deus**; Goose; Stromae; The Subs; Triggerfinger
Best Czech & Slovak Act	Best Danish Act
**Charlie Straight**: Ben Cristovao; Debbi; PSH; Rytmus	**Medina**: L.O.C.; Nik & Jay; Rasmus Seebach; Rune RK
Best Dutch Act	Best Finnish Act
**Ben Saunders**: Afrojack; Baskervilles; De Jeugd van Tegenwoordig; Go Back to the Zoo	**Lauri Ylönen**: Anna Abreu; Children of Bodom; Haloo Helsinki!; Sunrise Avenue
Best French Act	Best German Act
**La Fouine**: Ben l'Oncle Soul; David Guetta; Martin Solveig; Soprano	**Lena**: Beatsteaks; Clueso; Culcha Candela; Frida Gold
Best Greek Act	Best Hungarian Act
**Mark F. Angelo featuring Shaya**: Κokkina Halia; Melisses; Onirama; Panos Mouzourakis featuring Kostis Maraveyas	**Compact Disco**: Bin-Jip; Fish!; Punnany Massif; The Carbonfools
Best Israeli Act	Best Italian Act
**The Young Professionals**: Izabo; Liran Danino; Sarit Hadad; The Walking Man	**Modà**: Fabri Fibra; Jovanotti; Negramaro; Verdena
Best Norwegian Act	Best Polish Act
**Eva & The Heartmaker**: Erik og Kriss; Jaa9 & OnklP; Jarle Bernhoft; Madcon	**Ewa Farna**: Afromental; Doda; Monika Brodka; Myslovitz
Best Portuguese Act	Best Romanian Act
**Aurea**: Amor Electro; Diego Miranda; Expensive Soul; The Gift	**Alexandra Stan**: Fly Project; Guess Who; Puya; Smiley
Best Russian Act	Best Spanish Act
**Nyusha**: Gradusi; Kasta; Machete; Timati	**Russian Red**: El Pescao; Nach; Vetusta Morla; Zenttric
Best Swedish Act	Best Swiss Act
**Swedish House Mafia**: Eric Amarillo; Mohombi; Robyn; Veronica Maggio	**Gimma**: Adrian Stern; Baschi; Myron; TinkaBelle
Best Turkish Act	Best Ukrainian Act
**Atiye Deniz**: Cartel; Duman; Hadise; Mor ve Ötesi	**Sirena**: Jamala; Ivan Dorn; Kazaky; Max Barskih
Best UK & Ireland Act	
**Adele**: Coldplay; Florence and the Machine; Jessie J; Kasabian	

== Worldwide Act nominations ==
Winners are in bold text.

Best Africa, Middle East and India Act	Best Asia and Pacific Act
**Abd El Fattah Grini**: Black Coffee; Cabo Snoop; Fally Ipupa; Wizkid	**Big Bang**: Agnes Monica; Exile; Gotye; Jane Zhang; Jay Chou; Sia
Best European Act	Best Latin American Act
**Lena**: Adele; Alexandra Stan; Atiye Deniz; Aurea; Ben Saunders; Charlie Straight; Compact Disco; Deus; Dubioza kolektiv; Eva & the Heartmaker; Ewa Farna; Gimma; La Fouine; Lauri Ylönen; Mark F. Angelo & Shaya; Medina; Modà; Nyusha; Russian Red; Sirena; Swedish House Mafia; The Young Professionals	**Restart**: Ádammo; Babasónicos; Belanova; Calle 13; Don Tetto; No Te Va Gustar; Panda; Seu Jorge; Zoé
Best North American Act	
**Britney Spears**: Beyoncé; Bruno Mars; Foo Fighters; Justin Bieber; Katy Perry; Lady Gaga; Lil Wayne	

== Performances ==
=== Pre show ===
- Jason Derülo — "It Girl / In My Head"

=== Main show ===
- Coldplay — "Every Teardrop Is a Waterfall"
- LMFAO (featuring Lauren Bennett and GoonRock) — "Party Rock Anthem"
- Bruno Mars — "Marry You"
- Jessie J — "Price Tag"
- Red Hot Chili Peppers — "The Adventures of Rain Dance Maggie"
- Lady Gaga — "Marry the Night"
- Selena Gomez & the Scene — "Hit the Lights"
- Snow Patrol — "Called Out in the Dark"
- Justin Bieber — "Mistletoe / Never Say Never"
- David Guetta (featuring Taio Cruz, Ludacris and Jessie J) — "Sweat (David Guetta Remix) / Little Bad Girl / Without You"
- Queen + Adam Lambert — "The Show Must Go On / We Will Rock You / We Are the Champions"

=== Digital show ===
- Snow Patrol — "This Isn't Everything You Are"
- Jason Derülo — "Don't Wanna Go Home"

== Appearances ==
- Louise Roe and Tim Kash — Red carpet hosts
- Nicole Polizzi and Jennifer Farley — presented Best Live Act
- David Hasselhoff — presented Best Female
- Katy Perry — presented Global Icon Award
- Ashley Rickards and Sheamus — presented Best Male
- Amy Lee — introduced Red Hot Chili Peppers
- Jeremy Scott and From Above — presented Best New Act
- Hayden Panettiere — presented Best Song
- Malcolm-Jamal Warner and Tracee Ellis Ross — presented Best Worldwide Act
- Jessie J — introduced the Amy Winehouse tribute
- Bar Refaeli and Irina Shayk — presented Best Video

== See also ==
- 2011 MTV Video Music Awards
