= Kiruba =

Ecuadorian pop group

- Origin: Quito, Ecuador
- Genres: Pop rock, teen pop.
- Works: MTM Records
- Years active: 2003–2004; 2008–2009
- Label: MTM Records
- Members: María José Blum, Cecilia Calle, Mariela Nazareno, Diana Rueda, Gabriela Villalba
- Website: Official website

Kiruba was an Ecuadorian pop group that originated from the 2002 Ecuadorian season of the reality television show Popstars. The original members of the group were Maria Jose Blum, Diana Rueda, Mariela Nazareno, Gabriela Villalba, and Cecilia Calle.

The group's history can be divided into three phases. The first phase took place from 2003 to 2004, immediately after winning Popstars. The second phase occurred from 2008 to 2009 under the name "Hada 4" after Gabriela Villalba left to join the Chilean band Kudai. The final phase was from 2017 to 2018, during which the group reunited under their original name.

As a quintet they released two studio albums and five singles, selling more than 10,000 copies of their albums, but they separated in 2004 due to differences between the members and the promotion of the television channel that managed their career. Four years later they met under the name of Hada 4 and without the presence of Gabriela Villalba, who at that time was part of the group Kudai, releasing an album and a single with little acceptance. They finally met again in 2017 to release a studio album.

On October 23, 2018, Kiruba confirmed through social media that Cecilia Calle had departed from the group, citing her desire to focus on her family.

== History ==
The band emerged from the first season of the Ecuadorian version of the reality show Popstars, which aired on the Teleamazonas Channel in 2003. After three months of competition, a panel of judges selected the final five members: María José Blum (Guayaquil), Diana Rueda (Quito), Mariela Nazareno (Esmeraldas), Gabriela Villalba (Quito) and Cecilia Calle (Guayaquil).

During the show, the name Kiruba was chosen, based on a suggestion by Diana Rueda, which referenced Quiruba, a leader of the Amazonian Shuar Tribe, known for bravely fighting the Spanish Conquerors near Macas.

=== Launch ===
The group released their debut album titled "Kiruba" immediately after winning the competition, and it quickly sold 5,000 copies within a few days of its release. Kiruba became a national phenomenon and received numerous accolades, including a triple-platinum certification. Their first single, "Quisiera," topped the charts in Ecuador for several weeks and reached fifteenth place in Latin America on the HTV chart.

Although their subsequent singles, "Camina," ("Walk") "Me Pierdo," ("I get lost") and "Como Extraño Tu Luz," ("How I miss your light") were less successful, but they managed to achieve top positions on radio stations in Ecuador.

=== Second disc and separation ===
In 2004, the group released their second and final album as a quintet, titled "Baila La Luna" ("The Moon Dances"), which featured the single "Me Quedo Contigo" ("I Stay With You") reaching the third position on the Ecuadorian charts. However, the band disbanded that same year due to internal disagreements among the members.

After the breakup, Mariela Nazareno led a local rock band called Tinticos, Diana Rueda worked on several painting exhibitions, Cecilia Calle founded a dance company and pursued a career as a television host, María José Blum participated in the soap opera "El Cholito," and Gabriela Villalba joined the Chilean rock band Kudai in 2006.

=== Hada 4 ===
In 2008, four of the five former members of Kiruba: María José Blum, Diana Rueda, Cecilia Calle and Mariela Nazareno (Gabriela Villalba was already part of the international band Kudai), returned under the name of "Hada 4", a new project that brought them together in the recording studios and stages. The name change was due to the fact that the television channel that formed them as a group was the legal owner of the name Kiruba, and this time the girls wanted to work independently.

In June 2008, Kiruba announced during a press conference about their comeback to the music scene. They revealed that their first single from the new album, titled "Volviéndome Loca" ("Going Crazy"), would be released on July 15. However, on the night of November 9, during their first official appearance on the program "Bailando Por Un Sueño Edición Especial" (Dancing With The Stars Special Edition), it was revealed that Diana Rueda had left the group, resulting in Kiruba becoming a trio consisting of María José, Mariela, and Cecilia.

=== Return in 2017 ===
From the first days of August 2017, several rumors began to appear about a possible reunion of the five original members of Kiruba, especially on social networks related to the group, such as the Facebook page of the official fan club that had been inactive since November 2015, and surprisingly returned to activity with a series of clues. Other rumors appeared because the girls began to post mysterious photographs on their Instagram accounts, and it finally exploded when one of the fans claimed to have seen them recording a video on Salinas beach, and that he had even been able to hear part of the new musical theme.

On the night of August 23, 2017, the five former members of the band made an announcement through their social networks, published a photograph of all of them together and a written statement "Kiruba is back!" Confirming the reunion with the original name. The statement also included a preview with information from the album, which would be produced between Quito, Bogotá and Miami under the direction of Gustavo Pachín.

In August 2017, Kiruba announced his return to the stage in the media, with the 5 original members of the group on the cover of the Ecuadorian magazine "¡Hola!". Kiruba was a national trend on Twitter for 4 days. On January 30, 2018, Kiruba premiered his new song "Se Me Fue", with the collaboration of Magic Juan, a former member of Proyecto Uno. The musical theme mixes pop with urban and Latin. The song was composed by Andrés Torres, producer of the song Despacito; Santiago Hernández, former member of Sin Ánimo de Lucro; Gabriela Villalba and Sebastián Jácome. "Se Me fue", reached the first place in the Ecuadorian tabloids (25 Nationals) in the first week of its release, and remained in the top 10 of the list for 19 weeks.

On June 17, 2018, Kiruba premiered on his YouTube channel and Facebook "#LaRevuelta" a miniseries where the members tell anecdotes of the past with the band as well as the advances in their current musical project. In episode number four of the miniseries released on July 8, 2018, details of the band are revealed recording a new single, which is composed by Diana Rueda and produced by Cesar Galarza.

On October 23, 2018, Cecilia Calle announced her departure, through a statement on the group's social networks. One day after the announcement, Kiruba releases his second official single "Alma" along with a media tour and a national contest for a meet and greet at the official release of the video clip on November 21, 2018. "Alma", with music and lyrics by Diana Rueda and produced by Cesar Galarza, a member of the band Verde 70, debuted at position 12 of the Ecuadorian tabloid "25 Nacionales" in its first week of release.

On November 25, Kiruba returns with his first villiancico, but this time without Gabriela Villalba. "Blanca Navidad" reached in its first week of release the #2 on iTunes Charts in Ecuador.

In July 2024 they announced two dates with all the members a unique concert in Quito they sold more than 700 tickets and one of FlashBack 593 with other Ecuadorian artists in Guayaquil, they announced that Kiruba is in force and they will soon release a new promotional single.

== Kirubamanía ==
The success of the five girls was not only reflected in the explosive sales of their albums - unprecedented in Ecuadorian history - but also in their expansion into new commercial ventures, signing contracts with the major multinationals such as Nescafé, whose commercial was never released; Bellsouth (now Movistar), for which they composed a song and recorded a commercial; Wella's Wellapon hair care line, whose commercial was directed by Jorge Lucas; and the American brand Lee, which produced a clothing line inspired by the personal style of the members.

== Discography ==
=== Kiruba - 2003 ===
1. Quisiera
2. Como Extraño Tu Luz
3. Me Pierdo
4. Dame
5. Mirando Como Un Bobo Watching Like A Fool'
6. Te Llevo En Mi Corazón
7. Camina
8. Eres
9. Con Todo Lo Que Tengo
10. Mosaico Kiruba [El Aguacate, Pasional, Vasija de Barro]

=== Baila La Luna - 2004 ===
1. Me Quedo Contigo
2. La Cumbia Del Olvido
3. Calle Desierta
4. A Veces
5. Trotamundos
6. Vuelve A Mí
7. Pensar En Ti
8. Bello Ciao
9. Baila La Luna
10. Tarde O Temprano

=== Hada 4 - 2008 ===
1. Volviéndome Loca

== Members ==
- María José Blum: From Guayaquil, after the group disbanded she entered the world of acting with roles in theater musicals such as "Enredos entre dos", in addition to television series such as "El Cholito" and "La pareja feliz". In 2005, she released an album; the following year she got married, and in 2007 she opened her own perfume store.
- Diana Rueda: Born in Quito, after the Kiruba's breakup she dedicated herself to visual arts, exhibiting her work in galleries in her city. She founded a doll brand with the Japanese amigurumi technique, and in 2013 he released an album entitled "Del Otro Lado".
- Mariela Nazareno: From Esmeraldas, Ecuador, after the separation of the band in 2004, she formed a folk rock band called Tinticos. She then transitioned to television, debuted as an entertainment reporter in the program Noche a Noche with Marián of Canal 1, later hosting several programs on Ecuador TV. She participated in the reality show "Escuela de famosos" of Ecuavisa, acted in theater productions and became an arts academy instructor in Quito.
- Cecilia Calle: Born in Guayaquil. In 2005, she debuted as a presenter of the entertainment program "En Corto", then became presenter of the youth program Conectados de Gamavisión. She married choreographer Walter Rueda and founded her own dance academy. She became a notable fashion and style blogger, co-hosted TC Televisión's entertaining variety morning programs and then RTS's El Club de la Mañana. She stepped away from the spotlight after her second marriage to the businessman Jorge Juan Eljuri, with whom she moved to Miami.
- Gabriela Villalba: From Quito. After the band's breakup, she starred in a Colombian youth telenovela called Al ritmo de tu corazón. Returning to Ecuador, she released the album Todo Bien in 2006, whose lead single "Me doy vueltas" topped Ecuadorian charts. However, she halted promotion to join the Chilean pop rock band Kudai, relocating to Mexico with them. After Kudai disbanded in 2010, Gabriela focused on personal projects, sporadically releasing songs such as "Psycho" (2014), "París," "Saudade," and "Imposible" (2016). Involved in campaigns against eating disorders among teenagers, she is a spokesperson for the "Quiérete" campaign with cosmetics brands Cyzone and L’Bel.

== See also ==
- Women in Music
