= Premios 40 Principales for Chilean Act =

Spanish music award

Premios 40 Principales for Best Chilean Act
- Awarded for: Best in Spanish and International music
- Country: Spain/America
- Presented by: Los 40 Principales
- First award: 2007

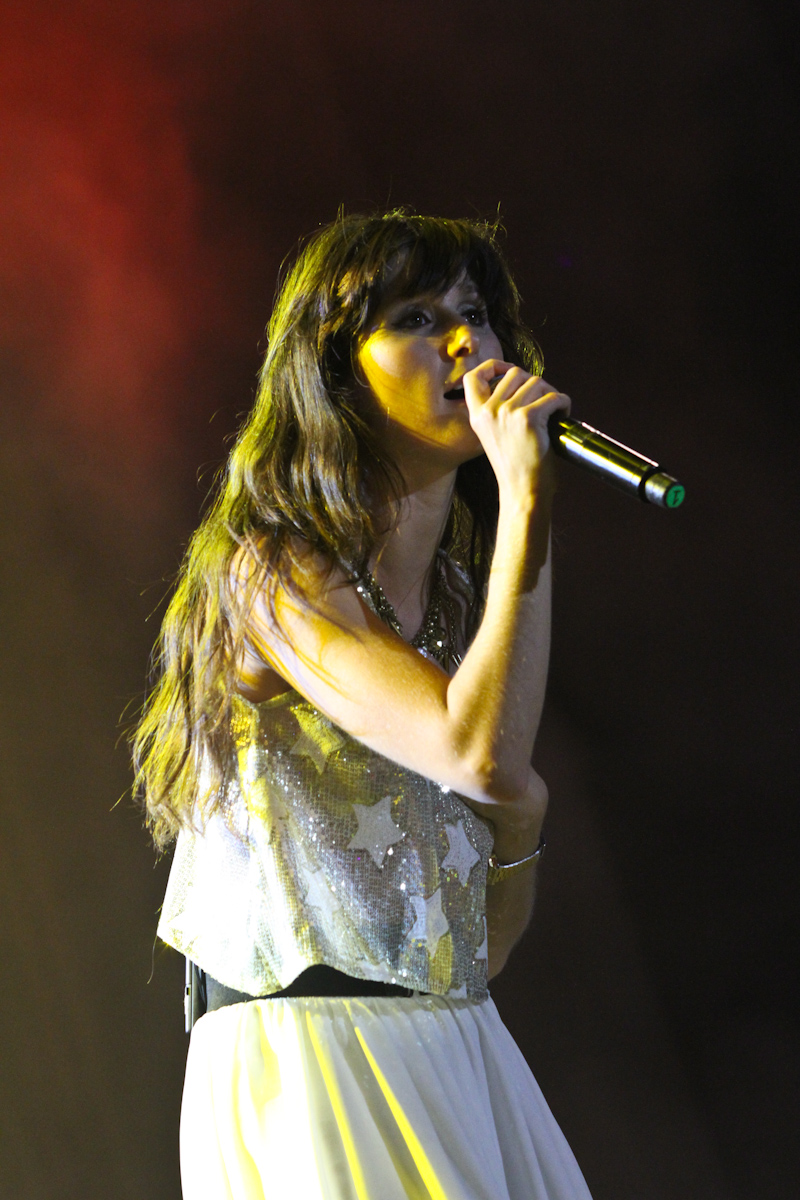
2014 winner Francisca Valenzuela.

The Premio 40 Principales for Best Chilean Act is an honor presented annually at Los Premios 40 Principales from 2007 to 2011. It was then discontinued due to the creation of Los Premios 40 Principales América, reemerging in 2014 as part of them.

| Year | Winner | Other nominees |
Los Premios 40 Principales España
| 2007 | Kudai | Amango; Difuntos Correa; Sinergia; Six Pack |
| 2008 | Shamanes | Kudai; Denise Rosenthal; De Saloon; Nicole Natalino |
| 2009 | Chancho en Piedra | Kata Palacios; Sinergia; Movimiento Original; Zk y Crac MC |
| 2010 | DJ Méndez | Koko Stambuk; Zaturno; Chico Trujillo; Croni K |
| 2011 | Los Vásquez | Mc Billeta; Eyci and Cody; Francisca Valenzuela; Los Bunkers |
Los Premios 40 Principales América
| 2014 | Francisca Valenzuela | Gondwana; Gepe; Ana Tijoux; Javiera Mena |
