= MTV Europe Music Award for Best Latin American Act =

Category of MTV Europe Music Awards

The following is a list of the MTV Europe Music Award winners and nominees for Best Latin American Act.

== 2010s ==
Year	Winner	Nominees
2011	Restart	Ádammo; Babasónicos; Belanova; Calle 13; Don Tetto; No Te Va Gustar; Panda; Seu Jorge; Zoé
2012	Restart	Axel; Don Tetto; Panda
2013	Fresno	Anna Carina; Airbag; Paty Cantú
2014	Dulce Maria	Don Tetto; Miranda!; Anitta
2015	Anitta	Axel; J Balvin; Mario Bautista
2016	Maluma	Anitta; Lali; Paty Cantú

== See also ==
- MTV Video Music Award for Best Latin Artist
- MTV VMA International Viewer's Choice Award for MTV Brasil
- MTV VMA International Viewer's Choice Award for MTV Latin America
- MTV VMA International Viewer's Choice Award for MTV Internacional
- MTV Video Music Brazil
