= MTV Europe Music Award for Best Arabia Act =

Category of MTV Europe Music Awards

The following is a list of the MTV Europe Music Award winners and nominees for Best Arabian Act. In 2012 award was given as Best Middle East Act.

== 2000s ==
Year	Winner	Nominees
2007	Rashed Al-Majed	Nancy Ajram; Elissa; Mohamed Hamaki; Tamer Hosny
2008	Karl Wolf	Abri; Fayez; Mohamed Hamaki; Carole Samaha
2009	Joe Ashkar	Rashed Al-Majed; Darine Hadchiti; Amr Mostafa; Ramy Sabry

== 2010s ==
Year	Winner	Nominees
2010	Mohamed Hamaki	Joseph Attieh; Khaled Selim
2012 ^{[a]}	Ahmed Soultan	K2Rhym (Karim AlGharbi); Karl Wolf; Qusai; Sandy
2013 ^{[a]}	Ahmed Soultan	Hamdan Al Abri; Juliana Down; Lara Scandar; Rakan
2014 ^{[a]}	Mohammed Assaf	Saad Lamjarred; Jana; Cairokee; Omar Basaad
2019 ^{[a]}	Karim Nour & Cheru Kunnath Paijas	Qusai; Rashed Al-Majed; Omar abdullat

^{^[a]}award given as Best Middle East Act
