= 2014 MTV Europe Music Awards =

Annual edition of the awards show

- Date: 9 November 2014 (9:00 PM CET)
- Location: The SSE Hydro, Glasgow, Scotland
- Hosted by: Nicki Minaj
- Most awards: One Direction and 5 Seconds of Summer (3 each)
- Most nominations: Katy Perry (7)
- Website: http://tv.mtvema.com

Television/radio coverage
- Network: MTV, VIVA, Channel 5

The 2014 MTV EMAs (also known as the MTV Europe Music Awards) were held at The SSE Hydro, Glasgow, Scotland on 9 November 2014. This was the first time since 2003 when the awards were held in Scotland and the fifth time the United Kingdom has hosted the MTV EMA since the show was hosted in Belfast, Northern Ireland. The event showcases the world's hottest musical acts in a different city each year. The event was hosted by Nicki Minaj.

Ariana Grande opened the show with "Problem" and "Break Free". An additional performance from Alicia Keys was featured at the O2 Academy Glasgow. Ozzy Osbourne received the award for Global Icon from Slash. Slash closed the show performing "Crazy Train" featuring The Conspirators and with Myles Kennedy and Simon Neil from Biffy Clyro on vocals.

One Direction and 5 Seconds Of Summer were the biggest winners of the night with three wins, followed by Ariana Grande and Katy Perry.

== Voting process ==
Category	Voting Method	Start date	End date
Biggest Fans	Twitter and Instagram Hashtag	15 Sept @12 pm CET	8 Nov @ 11:59 pm CET
Worldwide Act Pre-Nomination	Twitter and Weibo (in China only) Hashtag	9 Sept @ 12 pm CET	14 Sept @ 11:59 pm CET
Worldwide Act Phase 1 - Local	Website mtvema.com/App	16 Sept @12 pm CET	22 Oct @ 11:59 pm CET
Worldwide Act Phase 2 - Cluster	Website mtvema.com/App	23 Oct @ 12 pm CET	29 Oct @ 11:59 pm CET
Worldwide Act Phase 3 - Final	Website mtvema.com/App	30 Oct @ 12 pm CET	8 Nov @ 11:59 pm CET
Best Video	MTV Music Editorial Team - not eligible for audience voting	N/A	N/A
Global Icon	MTV Music Editorial Team - not eligible for audience voting	N/A	N/A
Greatest EMA Moments	Website mtvema.com/mtv-ema-top-20	25 Sept @12 pm CET	20 Nov @ 11:59 pm CET
Additional Social Category (Artist on the Rise, #EMAzing Artist)	social media	TBA	TBA
All Others	Website mtvema.com/App	16 Sept @12 pm CET	8 Nov @ 11:59 pm CET

== Nominations ==
Winners are in bold text.

Best Song	Best Video
**Ariana Grande (featuring Iggy Azalea) — "Problem"**: Eminem (featuring Rihanna) — "The Monster"; Katy Perry (featuring Juicy J) — "Dark Horse"; Pharrell Williams — "Happy"; Sam Smith — "Stay With Me"	**Katy Perry (featuring Juicy J) — "Dark Horse"**: Iggy Azalea (featuring Rita Ora) — "Black Widow"; Kiesza — "Hideaway"; Pharrell Williams — "Happy"; Sia — "Chandelier"
Best Female	Best Male
**Ariana Grande**: Beyoncé; Katy Perry; Nicki Minaj; Taylor Swift	**Justin Bieber**: Ed Sheeran; Eminem; Justin Timberlake; Pharrell Williams
Best New Act	Best Pop
**5 Seconds of Summer**: Ariana Grande; Charli XCX; Kiesza; Sam Smith	**One Direction**: 5 Seconds of Summer; Ariana Grande; Katy Perry; Miley Cyrus
Best Electronic	Best Rock
**Calvin Harris**: Afrojack; Avicii; David Guetta; Hardwell	**Linkin Park**: Arctic Monkeys; The Black Keys; Coldplay; Imagine Dragons
Best Alternative	Best Hip-Hop
**Thirty Seconds To Mars**: Arcade Fire; Lana Del Rey; Lorde; Paramore	**Nicki Minaj**: Drake; Eminem; Iggy Azalea; Kanye West
Best Live Act	Best World Stage Performance
**One Direction**: Beyoncé; Bruno Mars; Justin Timberlake; Katy Perry	**Enrique Iglesias**: Afrojack; B.o.B; Ellie Goulding; Fall Out Boy; Flo Rida; Hardwell; Imagine Dragons; The Killers; Kings of Leon; Linkin Park; Nicole Scherzinger; Pharrell Williams; Simple Plan
Best Push Act	Biggest Fans
**5 Seconds of Summer**: Ariana Grande; Charli XCX; Cris Cab; John Newman; Jungle; Kid Ink; Kiesza; Lorde; Sam Smith; Zedd	**One Direction**: 5 Seconds of Summer; Ariana Grande; Justin Bieber; Nicki Minaj
Best Look	Best Worldwide Act
**Katy Perry**: Iggy Azalea; Nicki Minaj; Rita Ora; Taylor Swift	**Bibi Zhou**: 5 Seconds of Summer; Alessandra Amoroso; B.A.P.; Dawid Kwiatkowski; Dulce Maria; Fifth Harmony; Mohammed Assaf; One Direction; Revolverheld
Artist on the Rise	Best Song With A Social Message
**5 Seconds Of Summer**: Fifth Harmony; Jake Miller; Lucy Hale; Nick Jonas	**Beyoncé — "Pretty Hurts"**: Alicia Keys — "We Are Here"; Arcade Fire — "We Exist"; Hozier — "Take Me to Church"; Meghan Trainor — "All About That Bass"
Global Icon
**Ozzy Osbourne**

== Regional nominations ==
Winners are in bold text.

=== Northern Europe ===
Best Danish Act	Best Finnish Act
**Christopher**: Burhan G; L.I.G.A; Medina; Sivas	**Isac Elliot**: Kasmir; Nikke Ankara; Robin; Teflon Brothers
Best Norwegian Act	Best Swedish Act
**Adelén**: Anders Nilsen; Donkeyboy; Martin Tungevaag; Nico & Vinz	**The Fooo**: Anton Ewald; Avicii; Icona Pop; Tove Lo
Best UK & Ireland Act	
**One Direction**: Calvin Harris; Cheryl Cole; Ed Sheeran; Sam Smith	

=== Southern Europe ===
Best French Act	Best Greek Act
**Indila**: Casseurs Flowters; Christine and the Queens; Julien Doré; Tal	**Vegas**: Demy; Despina Vandi; Kostas Martakis; Thanos Petrelis
Best Italian Act	Best Portuguese Act
**Alessandra Amoroso**: Caparezza; Club Dogo; Emis Killa; Giorgia	**David Carreira**: Amor Electro; Diego Miranda; HMB; Richie Campbell
Best Spanish Act	
**Enrique Iglesias**: Izal; Leiva; Sweet California; Vinila Von Bismark	

=== Central Europe ===
Best Belgian Act	Best Dutch Act
**Dimitri Vegas & Like Mike**: Netsky; The Oddword; Stromae; Triggerfinger	**Kensington**: Chef'Special; Hardwell; Martin Garrix; Mr. Probz
Best German Act	Best Swiss Act
**Revolverheld**: Cro; Marteria; Max Herre; Milky Chance; Sido	**Sinplus**: Bastian Baker; DJ Antoine; Mr. Da-Nos & The Product G&B; Remady & Manu-L

=== Eastern Europe ===
Best Adria Act	Best Israeli Act
**Van Gogh**: Gramatik; Punčke; Vatra; Who See	**TRIPL featuring Meital de Razon**: Eliad; E-Z; Dudu Tassa; Ido B & Zooki
Best Polish Act	Best Romanian Act
**Dawid Kwiatkowski**: Artur Rojek; Grzegorz Hyży; Jamal; Mrozu	**Andra**: Antonia Iacobescu; Elena Gheorghe; Maxim; Smiley
Best Russian Act	
**Nyusha**: Bianka; Kasta; Noize MC; Serebro	

=== Africa, Middle East and India ===
Best African Act	Best Middle East Act
**Sauti Sol**: Davido; Diamond; Goldfish; Toofan	**Mohammed Assaf**: Cairokee; Jana; Omar Basaad; Saad Lamjarred
Best Indian Act	
**Yo Yo Honey Singh**: Meet Bros Anjjan; Pritam Chakraborty; Vishal–Shekhar	

=== Japan and Korea ===
Best Japanese Act	Best Korean Act
**Daichi Miura**: E-Girls; Namie Amuro; One Ok Rock; Perfume	**B.A.P**: BTS; Beast; CNBLUE; Kara

=== Southeast Asia, Mainland China, Hong Kong and Taiwan ===
Best Southeast Asian Act	Best Mainland China and Hong Kong Act
**Sarah Geronimo**: Agnez Mo; Hồ Ngọc Hà; Noah; Stefanie Sun; Slot Machine; Yuna	**Bibi Zhou**: G.E.M.; Moraynia Liu; Wang Feng; Jason Zhang
Best Taiwanese Act	
**Hebe Tien**: A-mei; Mayday; Sodagreen; Will Pan	

=== Australia and New Zealand ===
Best Australian Act	Best New Zealand Act
**5 Seconds Of Summer**: Havana Brown; Iggy Azalea; Justice Crew; Sia	**Lorde**: Broods; Ginny Blackmore; Kimbra; Stan Walker

=== Latin America ===
Best Brazilian Act	Best Latin America North Act
**Anitta**: Marcelo D2; MC Guimê; Pitty; Projota	**Dulce María**: Camila; CD9; Panda; Zoé
Best Latin America Central Act	Best Latin America South Act
**Don Tetto**: Alkilados; J Balvin; Mirella Cesa; Nicolás Mayorca	**Miranda!**: Babasónicos; Banda de Turistas; Maxi Trusso; Tan Biónica

=== North America ===
Best Canadian Act	Best US Act
**Justin Bieber**: Arcade Fire; Avril Lavigne; Drake; Kiesza	**Fifth Harmony**: Beyoncé; Eminem; Katy Perry; Pharrell Williams

== Worldwide nominations ==
Winners are in bold text.

Best Northern European Act	Best Southern European Act
**One Direction**: Adelén; The Fooo; Christopher; Isac Elliot	**Alessandra Amoroso**: David Carreira; Enrique Iglesias; Shaka Ponk; Vegas
Best Central European Act	Best Eastern European Act
**Revolverheld**: Dimitri Vegas & Like Mike; Kensington; Sinplus	**Dawid Kwiatkowski**: Andra; Nyusha; Tripl featuring Meital de Razon; Van Gogh
Best Africa, Middle East and India Act	Best Japan and Korea Act
**Mohammed Assaf**: Sauti Sol; Yo Yo Honey Singh	**B.A.P.**: Daichi Miura
Best Southeast Asia, China, Hong Kong and Taiwan Act	Best Australia and New Zealand Act
**Bibi Zhou**: Hebe Tien; Sarah Geronimo	**5 Seconds of Summer**: Lorde
Best Latin American Act	Best North American Act
**Dulce Maria**: Anitta; Don Tetto; Miranda!	**Fifth Harmony**: Justin Bieber

== Performances ==
Artist(s)	Song(s)
Pre-Show
Fifth Harmony	"BO$$"
Nick Jonas	"Jealous"
Main show
Ariana Grande	"Problem" "Break Free"
Kiesza	"Hideaway"
Royal Blood	"Figure It Out"
Charli XCX	"Boom Clap" "Break the Rules"
U2	"Every Breaking Wave"
Nicki Minaj; Skylar Grey	"Super Bass" "Bed of Lies" "Anaconda"
Ed Sheeran	"Thinking Out Loud"
Enrique Iglesias; Gente de Zona	"I'm a Freak" "Bailando"
Alicia Keys	"We Are Here"
Slash; Myles Kennedy; The Conspirators; Simon Neil	**Tribute to Ozzy Osbourne** "Crazy Train"

== Appearances ==
=== Pre show ===
- Bonang Matheba — Red Carpet Host
- Laura Whitmore — Pre-Red Carpet and Backstage Host
- Sway Calloway — Pre-Red Carpet Host

=== Main show ===
- Emeli Sandé and Alicia Keys – presented Best Song
- Redfoo — presented Best Pop
- Jena Malone and Jourdan Dunn – presented Best Hip-Hop
- Laura Whitmore – presented Best Song With a Social Message
- Slash – presented Global Icon
- Afrojack – presented Worldwide Act
- David Hasselhoff, Brie Bella and Nikki Bella – presented Best Female

== See also ==
- 2014 MTV Video Music Awards
