= Premios Nuestra Tierra =

- Awarded for: Outstanding achievements for artists in the Colombian music industry
- Country: Colombia
- First award: 2007

The Premios Nuestra Tierra or Our Country Awards is an annual Colombian music award show. They have a format similar to that of the Grammy Awards, but restricted to the Colombian scope. The first Premios Nuestra Tierra were held in 2007. From 2015 through 2019 the show was discontinued for unknown reasons, until 2020 when they returned.

== History ==
The awards began in 2007 and were created by Blanca Luz Holguín, Fernán Martínez and Alejandro Villalobos with the purpose of encouraging Colombian artists and trying to encourage new Colombian singers so that the music industry in Colombia has much greater movement.

In 2008 and 2009 Movistar bought half of the proposal that was renamed "Premios Movistar nuestra tierra" in order to promote its other Colombian project "Movistar Radio". Since 2010 the prizes have been renamed "premios nuestra tierra" without any sponsored.

On May 16, 2020, after seven years since the last award ceremony, the ninth edition was held.

== Method of choice ==
The winners are chosen through an association that has the organization of the awards, where directors participate, some representatives of the Colombian record companies and executives of RCN and Caracol Radio.

== Trophy ==
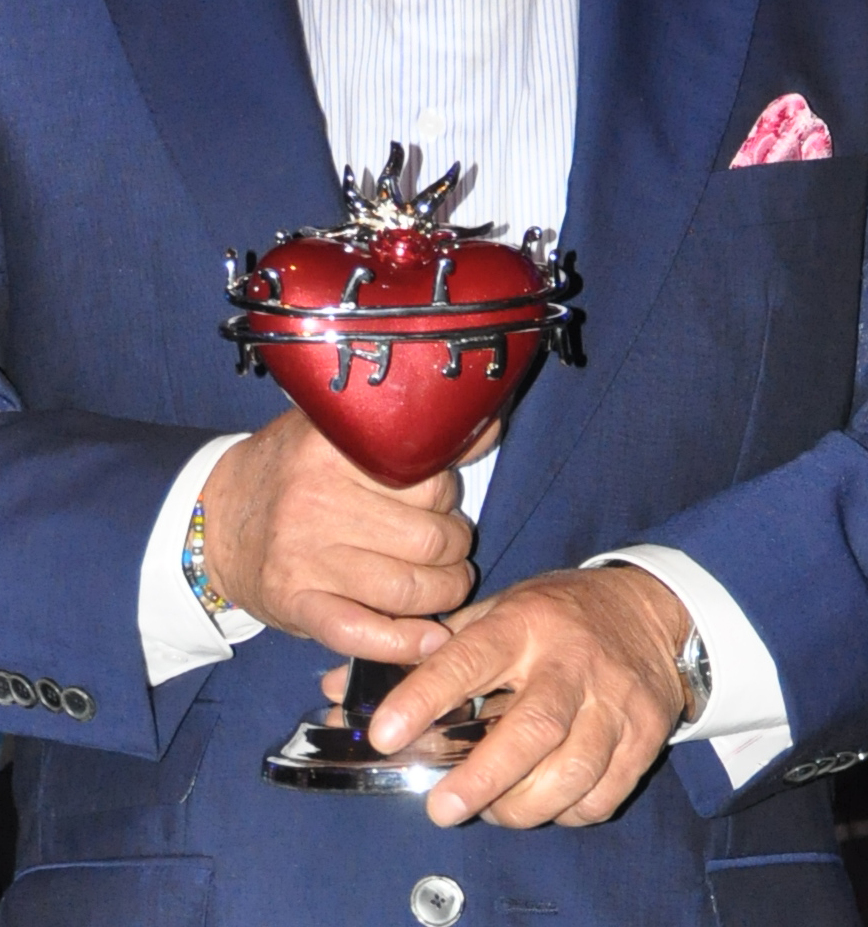
Example of a Nuestra Tierra trophy

The current award is a heart with musical notes around and a crown at the top representing the heart of Jesus.

At first the trophy was a plaque that symbolized the signs that Colombian public buses put to inform people where they are going, however, they realized that the plaque was very uncomfortable, and was later modernized to the current one.

== Categories ==
General

- Best Song of the Year
- Best Artist of the Year.
- Best Album of the Year.
- Best New Artist.
- Best Producer.

Tropical Pop

- Best Tropical Pop Interpretation.
- Best Tropical Pop Artist of the Year.

Pop

- Best Pop Artist of the Year
- Best Pop Song

Urban

- Best Urban Song of the Year
- Best Urban Artist

Alternative

- Best Alternative Artist
- Better Alternative Interpretation

Vallenato

- Best Performance
- Best Artist

Tropical

- Best Solo Artist or Tropical Group
- Best Tropical Interpretation

Folkloric

- Best Solo Artist or Folkloric Group of the Year
- Best Performance

Videos

- Best Video for Artist
- Best Music for TV
- Best Movie Soundtrack:

Popular (Colombian popular music)

- Best Artist of the year
- Best Song of the Year:

Christian

- Best Christian Song
- Best Christian Artist:

Públic

- Best Interpretation of the Public
- Best Public Artist
- Best Fan Club:

Digital

- Best Website:
- Twitterer of the Year
- Best DJ:

== Records ==
=== Most wins ===
The record for most Premios Nuestra Tierra won is held by J Balvin with 30 awards. The record for most Premios Nuestra Tierra won by a female artist belongs to Karol G with 19 awards. The record for most wins for a group belongs to ChocQuibTown, who have collected 8 awards.

Rank	Artist	Number of awards
1	J Balvin	30
2	Carlos Vives	20
3	Karol G	19
4	Silvestre Dangond	16
5	Fonseca	14
5	Pipe Bueno	14
6	Juanes	13
7	Shakira	12
8	Andrés Cepeda	11
8	Sebastián Yatra	11
9	ChocQuibTown	8
10	Camilo	7
10	Grupo Niche	7
10	Jorge Celedón	7
10	Santiago Cruz	7
11	Feid	6
12	Don Tetto	5
12	Dragon y Caballero	5
13	Doctor Krápula	4
13	Guayacán Orquesta	4
13	Jhonny Rivera	4
13	Morat	4
13	Ovy On The Drums	4
14	Andrés Cabas	3
14	Cholo Valderrama	3
14	Giovanny Ayala	3
14	Jessi Uribe	3
14	La Iguana	3
14	Luis Alfonso	3
14	Maluma	3
14	Manuel Turizo	3
14	Monsieur Periné	3
14	Nicki Minaj	3
14	Ryan Castro	3

=== Most wins in a single ceremony ===
The record for the most Premios Nuestra Tierra won in a single year is held by Juanes, J Balvin and Karol G in 2008, 2012 and 2024, respectively.

Silvestre Dangond (in 2009) and Carlos Vives (in 2013 and 2014) follow with 6 awards. Additionally Fonseca (in 2007), Andrés Cepeda (in 2010), J Balvin (in 2020) and Karol G (in 2022) follow with 5 awards won in a single year.

- Juanes: 8 (2008)
- J Balvin: 8 (2012)
- Karol G: 8 (2024)

== See also ==
- Latin American television awards
