= Quisiera =

Quisiera may refer to:

- Quisiera, 1989 album by Emmanuel
  - the song from the album
- "Quisiera", 1994 song by Ricardo Montaner
- "Quisiera", 1998 by Juan Luis Guerra from the album Ni es lo mismo ni es igual
- "Quisiera", 2003 song by Kiruba from the album Kiruba (album)
