= 2012 MTV Europe Music Awards =

Annual edition of the awards show

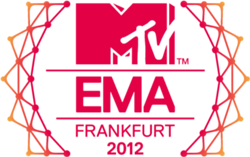
- Date: 11 November 2012
- Location: Festhalle Frankfurt, Frankfurt, Germany
- Hosted by: Heidi Klum and Ludacris

Highlights
- Most awards: Taylor Swift, Justin Bieber and One Direction (3)
- Most nominations: Rihanna (8)

Television/radio coverage
- Network: Viacom International Media Networks (Europe)

The 2012 MTV EMAs (also known as the MTV Europe Music Awards) were held in Frankfurt, Germany, on 11 November 2012. This was the fifth time the awards had been held in Germany, and the second time Frankfurt had been the host city. On 17 August the nominees were announced. Rihanna received eight nominations while Katy Perry and Taylor Swift received five, leading the categories.

This year added new regional categories to compete in the Best Worldwide Act, as well as the Best Look category, due to the presence of the same award at the Italian TRL Awards. Taylor Swift, Han Geng, Justin Bieber and One Direction were the biggest winners taking home three awards each.

== Nominations ==
Winners are in bold text.

Best Song	Best Video
**Carly Rae Jepsen – "Call Me Maybe"**: Fun (featuring Janelle Monáe) – "We Are Young"; Gotye (featuring Kimbra) – "Somebody That I Used to Know"; Pitbull (featuring Chris Brown) – "International Love"; Rihanna (featuring Calvin Harris) – "We Found Love"	**Psy – "Gangnam Style"**: Katy Perry – "Wide Awake"; Lady Gaga – "Marry the Night"; M.I.A. – "Bad Girls"; Rihanna (featuring Calvin Harris) – "We Found Love"
Best Female	Best Male
**Taylor Swift**: Katy Perry; Nicki Minaj; Pink; Rihanna	**Justin Bieber**: Flo Rida; Jay-Z; Kanye West; Pitbull
Best New Act	Best Pop
**One Direction**: Carly Rae Jepsen; Fun; Lana Del Rey; Rita Ora	**Justin Bieber**: Katy Perry; No Doubt; Rihanna; Taylor Swift
Best Electronic	Best Rock
**David Guetta**: Avicii; Calvin Harris; Skrillex; Swedish House Mafia	**Linkin Park**: Coldplay; Green Day; Muse; The Killers
Best Alternative	Best Hip-Hop
**Lana Del Rey**: Arctic Monkeys; Florence and the Machine; Jack White; The Black Keys	**Nicki Minaj**: Drake; Jay-Z & Kanye West; Nas; Rick Ross
Best Live Act	Best World Stage Performance
**Taylor Swift**: Green Day; Jay-Z & Kanye West; Lady Gaga; Muse	**Justin Bieber**: Arcade Fire; Arctic Monkeys; B.o.B; Evanescence; Flo Rida; Jason Derülo; Joe Jonas; Kasabian; Kesha; LMFAO; Maroon 5; Nelly Furtado; Red Hot Chili Peppers; Sean Paul; Snoop Dogg; Snow Patrol; Taylor Swift
Best Push Act	Biggest Fans
**Carly Rae Jepsen**: Conor Maynard; Foster the People; Fun; Gotye; Lana Del Rey; Mac Miller; Michael Kiwanuka; Of Monsters and Men; Rebecca Ferguson; Rita Ora	**One Direction**: Justin Bieber; Katy Perry; Lady Gaga; Rihanna
Best Look	Best Worldwide Act
**Taylor Swift**: ASAP Rocky; Jack White; Nicki Minaj; Rihanna	**Han Geng**: Ahmed Soultan; Dima Bilan; Restart; Rihanna
MTV2 US Artist About to Go Global	
**MGK**: 2 Chainz; ASAP Rocky; Big Sean; Mac Miller; Tyga	
Global Icon
**Whitney Houston**

== Regional nominations ==
Winners are in bold text.

=== Europe ===
Best Adria Act	Best Belgian Act
**Who See**: Elemental; MVP; TBF; Trash Candy	**Milow**: Deus; Netsky; Selah Sue; Triggerfinger
Best Czech & Slovak Act	Best Danish Act
**Majk Spirit**: Ben Cristovao; Sunshine; Mandrage; Celeste Buckingham	**Medina**: Aura Dione; L.O.C.; Nik & Jay; Rasmus Seebach
Best Dutch Act	Best Finnish Act
**Afrojack**: The Partysquad; Eva Simons; Gers Pardoel; Tiësto	**Robin**: Cheek; Chisu; Elokuu; PMMP
Best French Act	Best German Act
**Shaka Ponk**: Irma; Orelsan; Sexion D'Assaut; Tal	**Tim Bendzko**: Cro; Kraftklub; Seeed; Udo Lindenberg
Best Greek Act	Best Hungarian Act
**Vegas**: Claydee; Goin' Through; Melisses; Nikki Ponte	**30Y**: Funktasztikus; Odett; Soerii és Poolek; Supernem
Best Israeli Act	Best Italian Act
**Ninet Tayeb**: Dudu Tassa; Moshe Peretz; Riff Cohen; The Young Professionals	**Emis Killa**: Cesare Cremonini; Club Dogo; Giorgia; Marracash
Best Norwegian Act	Best Polish Act
**Erik & Kriss**: Donkeyboy; Madcon; Karpe Diem; Sirkus Eliassen	**Monika Brodka**: Iza Lach; Mrozu; Pezet; The Stubs
Best Portuguese Act	Best Romanian Act
**Aurea**: Amor Electro; Klepht; Monica Ferraz; Os Azeitonas	**Vunk**: CRBL; Grasu XXL; Guess Who; Maximilian
Best Russian Act	Best Spanish Act
**Dima Bilan**: Kasta; Nervy; Serebro; Jeanna Friske	**The Zombie Kids**: Corizonas; Iván Ferreiro; Love of Lesbian; Supersubmarina
Best Swedish Act	Best Swiss Act
**Loreen**: Alina Devecerski; Avicii; Laleh; Panetoz	**DJ Antoine**: 77 Bombay Street; Mike Candys; Remady; Stress
Best Ukrainian Act	Best UK & Ireland Act
**Alloise**: Champagne Morning; Dio.Filmy; Ivan Dorn; The Hardkiss	**One Direction**: Conor Maynard; Jessie J; Ed Sheeran; Rita Ora

=== Africa, Middle East and India ===
Best African Act	Best Middle East Act
**D'Banj**: Camp Mulla; Mi Casa; Sarkodie; Wizkid	**Ahmed Soultan**: K2Rhym (Karim Gharbi); Karl Wolf; Qusai; Sandy
Best Indian Act	
**Alobo Naga & The Band**: Bandish Projekt; Indus Creed; Menwhopause	

=== Asia and Oceania ===
Best Asian Act	Best Australia & New Zealand Act
**Han Geng**: Yuna Zarai; Super Junior; Exile; Jolin Tsai	**Gotye**: 360; Gin Wigmore; Kimbra; The Temper Trap

=== Latin America ===
Best Brazilian Act	Best Latin America North Act
**Restart**: Agridoce; ConeCrewDiretoria; Emicida; Vanguart	**Panda**: Danna Paola; Jesse & Joy; Kinky; Ximena Sariñana
Best Latin America Central Act	Best Latin America South Act
**Don Tetto**: Ádammo; Caramelos de Cianuro; Juanes; Naty Botero	**Axel**: Babasónicos; Campo; Miranda!; Tan Biónica

== Worldwide Act nominations ==
Winners are in bold text.

Best Africa, Middle East and India Act	Best Asia and Pacific Act
**Ahmed Soultan**: Alobo Naga & The Band; D'Banj	**Han Geng**: Gotye
Best European Act	Best Latin American Act
**Dima Bilan**: 30Y; Afrojack; Alloise; Aurea; DJ Antoine; Emis Killa; Erik & Kriss; Loreen; Majk Spirit; Medina; Milow; Monika Brodka; One Direction; Robin; Shaka Ponk; Tim Bendzko; Vegas; Vunk; Who See; The Zombie Kids	**Restart**: Axel; Don Tetto; Panda
Best North American Act	
**Rihanna**: Carly Rae Jepsen; Chris Brown; Drake; Green Day; Justin Bieber; Katy Perry; Linkin Park; Pink; Usher	

== Performances ==
Artist(s)	Song(s)
Rita Ora	"R.I.P."
Fun	"We Are Young"
Carly Rae Jepsen	"Call Me Maybe"
Alicia Keys	"New Day" "Girl on Fire"
No Doubt	"Looking Hot"
The Killers	"Runaways"
Psy	"Gangnam Style"
Muse	"Madness"
Pitbull	"Don't Stop the Party"
Taylor Swift	"We Are Never Ever Getting Back Together"

== Appearances ==
- Louise Roe, Tim Kash and Sway Calloway – Red carpet hosts and presented Biggest Fans
- Madeon - House DJ
- Lana Del Rey – presented Best Female
- Kim Kardashian – presented Best Song
- Cast of Geordie Shore (Gaz Beadle, Holly Hagan, Sophie Kasaei, Ricci Guarnaccio, Vicky Pattison, Daniel Thomas-Tuck, Jay Gardner and Charlotte Crosby) – presented Best Male
- Anne Vyalitsyna, Brett Davern and Isabeli Fontana – presented Best Live Act
- Heidi Klum – presented Best Look
- Alicia Keys – presented Global Icon
- David Hasselhoff – presented Best Video
- Jonas Brothers – presented Best Worldwide Act

== See also ==
- 2012 MTV Video Music Awards
