= MTV Europe Music Award for Best North American Act =

Category of MTV Europe Music Awards

The following is a list of the MTV Europe Music Award winners and nominees for Best North American Act.

== 2010s ==
Year	Winner	Nominees
2011	Britney Spears	Beyoncé; Lady Gaga; Bruno Mars; Foo Fighters; Justin Bieber; Katy Perry; Lil Wayne
2012	Rihanna	Carly Rae Jepsen; Chris Brown; Drake; Green Day; Justin Bieber; Katy Perry; Linkin Park; Pink; Usher
2013	Justin Bieber	Miley Cyrus
2014	Fifth Harmony	Justin Bieber
2015	Justin Bieber	Taylor Swift

== See also ==
- MTV Video Music Award
- MTV VMA International Viewer's Choice Award for MTV Canada
