= MTV Latin America Award for Breakthrough Artist =

Latino MTV award

The MTV Latin America Award for Breakthrough Artist (Spanish: Mejor Artista Revelación) was an honor presented annually at Los Premios MTV Latinoamérica, the Latin American version of the MTV Video Music Awards. The award was designed to recognize emerging talents within the Latin music industry who gained significant prominence during the eligibility period.

== History ==
The category was a staple of the ceremony from its inception in 2002 (then known as the VMALA) until the final broadcast of the awards in 2009. Unlike regional categories (e.g., Best New Artist – North), this category typically featured a mix of artists from across the Spanish-speaking world. Winners were presented with the "Lengua" (Tongue) trophy.

== Nominations and Winning Artists ==
This is a list of the Los Premios MTV Latinoamérica winners and nominees for Breakthrough Artist.

Year	Winner	Other nominees
2006	Panda	Allison; Motel; Kudai; Zoé
2007	Camila	División Minúscula; Estelares; Jesse & Joy; PopCorn
2008	Ximena Sariñana	Don Tetto; El Bordo; Johanna Carreño; Shaila
2009	Sonohra	Ádammo; Fanny Lu; Massacre; Paty Cantú
