= Don Tetto =

Colombian rock band

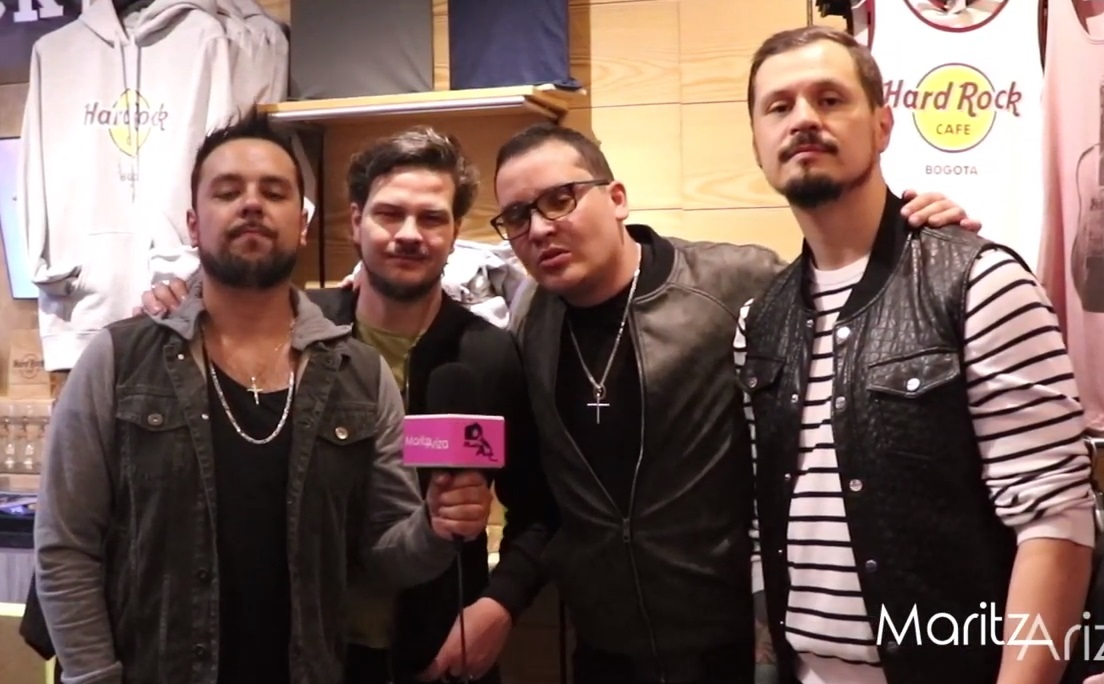
- Don Tetto in 2019

Background information
- Origin: Bogotá, Colombia
- Genres: Alternative rock, rock
- Years active: 2003–present
- Label: Akela Family Music
- Members: Diego Pulecio; Carlos Leongómez; Jaime Valderrama; Jaime Medina
- Website: http://www.dontetto.com

Don Tetto are a Colombian indie rock band. The band was formed by Diego Pulecio (lead vocals, rhythm guitar), Carlos Leongomez (lead guitar), James Valderrama (bass, vocals) and Jaime Medina (drums).

== History ==
=== Formation ===
Don Tetto was formed in March, 2003 in Bogotá to compete at a battle-of-the-bands, Rock al Parque event hosted by a local radio station, called Radioaktiva. Don Tetto was selected on the twelve best auditions of a 300 hundred demos that the organization recibed. They and won the contest, and at the second day, they shared escenary with bands like Division Minuscula and Pxndx. !!

=== Early days ===
In August 2003 Don Tetto released their first single, “Pienso”, which was well received by critics and listeners. The band began experimenting with popular sounds of the time, trying to find a musical identity. Focusing on alternative rock, Don Tetto composed new songs and recorded a live demo EP. In March 2004 the band released their second single, ”Yo estaré bien”. This release made Don Tetto one of the best-known bands in Bogotá, and the song reached #1 at several radio stations. In 2005 the band released a third single, "Soledad".

=== Mainstream success and Lo que no sabías ===
Don Tetto recorded their first album Lo que no sabías in February 2007 at Artico Studios, under the supervision of producer Jorge Holguín. The album was remixed and mastered in Miami by Boris Milan and Mike Couzzic.

During the recording process, the band signed with Cabeza De Ratón Music Entertainment, led by their manager Ricardo Rodríguez, who also created their official fan club “Tettomania” in Bogotá.

Lo que no sabías was released on August 10, 2007, breaking sales records and occupying the 4th place of the bestseller albums list in Tower Records.

Their singles “Ha vuelto a suceder” and "Fallido intento" were well received by radio stations in Colombia.

Don Tetto filmed music videos for “Ha Vuelto A Suceder”, "Adicto al dolor (lagrimas)", "Adiós", and "Fallido intento". They completed a four-month tour of the United States, Puerto Rico, and Mexico.

Lo que no sabías was remixed and re-issued in 2008 with bonus tracks.

=== Miénteme, Prométeme ===
Not long after finishing touring for Lo que no sabias Don Tetto began recording their second full-length studio album: Miénteme, Prométeme, released in mid 2010. The first single was "No digas lo siento". The release was accompanied by a self-produced music video depicting the band in a party setup. The single climbed to the top of the charts of MTV Latin America.

In 2011, they released another single, "Mi error" with a music video filmed in Orlando, Florida. This new single occupied the top spots on Hispanic networks HTV and MTV. Later in the year, they released a video for the titular song to the album.

In September 2011 the band was nominated both for a Latin Grammy and for the EMA's (MTV Europe Music Awards) as a "World Wide Act Latin American Nominee". Miénteme, Prométeme was remixed and re-issued in the final months of the year.

In 2012, the band released a new single, "Sigamos Caminando", topping the charts in several radio stations. A week later, they released a music video for the song. The video received heavy airplay on HTV.

In May, 2012, Don Tetto released the fifth and final single for the album: "Voy a ser quien dañe tu nombre".

== Members ==
- Diego Pulecio: Lead Vocals, Rhythm Guitar
- Carlos Leongomez: Lead Guitar
- James Valderrama: Bass, Backing Vocals
- Jaime Medina: Drums

== Discography ==
- Lo Que No Sabías (2007)
- Lo Que No Sabias (Special Edition) (2008)
- Miénteme, Prométeme (2010)
- 360° (En Vivo Bogotá) (2013)
- Don Tetto (2014)

=== Singles ===
- "Adicto al dolor (lágrimas)" ("Addicted to Pain (Tears)")
- "Fallido intento" ("Failed Attempt")
- "Ha vuelto a suceder" ("It Has Happened Again")
- "Adiós" ("Goodbye")
- "Auto Rojo" ("Red Car")
- "No Digas Lo Siento" ("Don't Say You're Sorry")
- "Mi Error" ("My Mistake")
- "Miénteme, Prométeme" ("Lie To Me, Promise Me")
- "Sigamos Caminando" ("Let's Keep Walking")
- "Voy A Ser Quien Dañe Tu Nombre" ("I´ll Be the One Who Ruins Your Name")

== Awards and nominations ==
=== Latin Grammy Awards ===
A Latin Grammy Award is an accolade by the Latin Academy of Recording Arts & Sciences to recognize outstanding achievement in the music industry.

Year	Nominee / work	Award	Result
2011	Mienteme – Prometeme	Best Rock Album	Nominated
2014	Don Tetto	Best Rock Album	Nominated

=== MTV Europe Music Award ===
MTV Europe Music Awards EMAs Also known as, is a prize awarded annually since 1994 by MTV to popular music videos in Europe.

Year	Nominee / work	Award	Result
2011	Mienteme – Prometeme	Best Latin American Act	Nominated
2012	Mienteme – Prometeme	Best Latin America Central Act	Won
2012	Mienteme – Prometeme	Best Latin American Act	Nominated
2014	Don Tetto	Best Latin America Central Act	Won
2014	Don Tetto	Best Latin American Act	Nominated

=== Los Premios MTV Latinoamérica ===
Los Premios MTV Latinoamérica or VMALA is the Latin American version of the MTV Video Music Award.

Year	Nominee / work	Award	Result
2008	Lo Que No Sabías	Breakthrough Artist	Nominated
2008	Lo Que No Sabías	Best Artist — Central	Nominated
2009	Lo Que No Sabías	Best Artist — Central	Won
