= MTV Europe Music Award for Best Africa, Middle East and India Act =

Category of MTV Europe Music Awards

The following is a list of the MTV Europe Music Award winners and nominees for Best Africa, Middle East and India Act.

== 2010s ==
Year	Winner	Nominees
2011	Abdelfattah Grini	Black Coffee; Cabo Snoop; Fally Ipupa; Scribe; Wizkid
2012	Ahmed Soultan	Alobo Naga & The Band; D'Banj
2013	Ahmed Soultan	Locnville; Yo Yo Honey Singh
2014	Mohammed Assaf	Sauti Sol; Yo Yo Honey Singh
2015	Diamond Platnumz	Priyanka Chopra

== See also ==
- MTV VMA International Viewer's Choice Award for MTV India
- MTV Immies
- MTV Africa Music Awards
