= 2013 MTV Europe Music Awards =

Annual edition of the awards show

- Date: 10 November 2013 (9:00 pm CET)
- Location: Ziggo Dome, Amsterdam
- Hosted by: Redfoo
- Most awards: Eminem, Austin Mahone and Miley Cyrus (2 each)
- Most nominations: Justin Timberlake and Macklemore and Ryan Lewis (5)
- Website: http://tv.mtvema.com

Television/radio coverage
- Network: MTV

The 2013 MTV EMAs (also known as the MTV Europe Music Awards) were held at the Ziggo Dome, Amsterdam, Netherlands, on 10 November 2013. This was the second time the awards had taken place in the Netherlands, the last time being in 1997.

Several performances of the main show were performed at different locations in Amsterdam than the Ziggo Dome. Dutch DJ Afrojack performed at the Melkweg and was joined by Snoop Lion for the performance of 'Gin and Juice'. The American band Imagine Dragons performed their song 'Radioactive' at the Heineken Music Hall.

== Nominations ==
Winners are in bold text.

Best Song	Best Video
**Bruno Mars — "Locked Out of Heaven"**: Daft Punk (featuring Pharrell Williams) — "Get Lucky"; Macklemore & Ryan Lewis (featuring Wanz) — "Thrift Shop"; Rihanna — "Diamonds"; Robin Thicke (featuring T.I. and Pharrell Williams) — "Blurred Lines"	**Miley Cyrus — "Wrecking Ball"**: Justin Timberlake — "Mirrors"; Lady Gaga — "Applause"; Robin Thicke (featuring T.I. and Pharrell Williams) — "Blurred Lines"; Thirty Seconds to Mars — "Up In The Air"
Best Female	Best Male
**Katy Perry**: Miley Cyrus; Lady Gaga; Selena Gomez; Taylor Swift	**Justin Bieber**: Bruno Mars; Eminem; Jay-Z; Justin Timberlake
Best New Act	Best Pop
**Macklemore & Ryan Lewis**: Bastille; Icona Pop; Imagine Dragons; Rudimental	**One Direction**: Justin Bieber; Katy Perry; Miley Cyrus; Taylor Swift
Best Electronic	Best Rock
**Avicii**: Afrojack; Daft Punk; Calvin Harris; Skrillex	**Green Day**: Black Sabbath; Kings of Leon; Queens of the Stone Age; The Killers
Best Alternative	Best Hip-Hop
**Thirty Seconds To Mars**: Arctic Monkeys; Fall Out Boy; Franz Ferdinand; Paramore	**Eminem**: Drake; Jay-Z; Kanye West; Macklemore & Ryan Lewis
Best Live Act	Best World Stage Performance
**Beyoncé**: Green Day; Justin Timberlake; Pink; Taylor Swift	**Linkin Park**: Alicia Keys; Fun; Garbage; Green Day; Jason Mraz; Jessie J; Macklemore & Ryan Lewis; No Doubt; Paramore; Rita Ora; Robin Thicke; Snoop Lion; The Black Keys; The Killers
Best Push Act	Biggest Fans
**Austin Mahone**: ASAP Rocky; Bastille; Bridgit Mendler; Icona Pop; Iggy Azalea; Imagine Dragons; Karmin; Rudimental; Tom Odell; Twenty One Pilots	**Tokio Hotel**: Justin Bieber; Lady Gaga; One Direction; Thirty Seconds to Mars
Best Look	Best Worldwide Act
**Harry Styles**: Justin Timberlake; Lady Gaga; Rihanna; Rita Ora	**Chris Lee**: Ahmed Soultan; Bednarek; Cody Simpson; EXO; Fresno; Justin Bieber; Lena; Marco Mengoni; One Direction
Artist on the Rise	
**Austin Mahone**: Ariana Grande; Bridgit Mendler; Cher Lloyd; Cody Simpson; Lorde	
Global Icon
**Eminem**

== Regional nominations ==
Winners are in bold text.

=== Northern Europe ===
Best Danish Act	Best Finnish Act
**Jimilian**: Medina; Nik & Jay; Panamah; Shaka Loveless	**Isac Elliot**: Anna Puu; Elokuu; Haloo Helsinki!; Mikael Gabriel
Best Norwegian Act	Best Swedish Act
**Admiral P**: Envy; Madcon; Maria Mena; Truls	**Avicii**: Icona Pop; John de Sohn; Medina; Sebastian Ingrosso
Best UK & Ireland Act	
**One Direction**: Ellie Goulding; Calvin Harris; Olly Murs; Rudimental	

=== Southern Europe ===
Best French Act	Best Greek Act
**Shaka Ponk**: C2C; Daft Punk; Maitre Gims; Tal	**Demy**: Goin' Through; Michalis Hatzigiannis & Midenistis; Pink Noisy; Sakis Rouvas
Best Italian Act	Best Portuguese Act
**Marco Mengoni**: Emma; Fedez; Max Pezzali; Salmo	**Filipe Pinto**: Monica Ferraz; Os Azeitonas; Richie Campbell; The Gift
Best Spanish Act	
**Auryn**: Pablo Alborán; Anni B Sweet; Fangoria; Lori Meyers	

=== Central Europe ===
Best Belgian Act	Best Dutch Act
**Stromae**: Lazy Jay; Netsky; Ozark Henry; Trixie Whitley	**Kensington**: Afrojack; Armin Van Buuren; Nicky Romero; Nielson
Best German Act	Best Swiss Act
**Lena**: Cro; Frida Gold; Sportfreunde Stiller; Tim Bendzko	**Bastian Baker**: DJ Antoine; Remady & Manu-L; Steff La Cheffe; Stress

=== Eastern Europe ===
Best Adria Act	Best Czech & Slovak Act
**Frenkie**: Filip Dizdar; Katja Šulc; S.A.R.S.; Svi na pod!	**Celeste Buckingham**: Ben Cristovao; Charlie Straight; Ektor & DJ Wich; Peter Bič Project
Best Hungarian Act	Best Israeli Act
**Ivan & The Parazol**: Hősök; Karanyi; Punnany Massif; The hated tomorrow	**The Ultras**: Ester Rada; Hadag Nahash; Ido B & Zooki; Roni Daloomi
Best Polish Act	Best Romanian Act
**Bednarek**: Dawid Podsiadło; Donatan; Ewelina Lisowska; Margaret	**Smiley**: Antonia; Corina; Loredana Groza; What's Up
Best Russian Act	
**Zemfira**: Basta; Ivan Dorn; Nyusha; Yolka	

=== Africa, Middle East and India ===
Best African Act	Best Middle East Act
**LCNVL**: Fuse ODG; Mafikizolo; P-Square; Wizkid	**Ahmed Soultan**: Hamdan Al Abri; Juliana Down; Lara Scandar; Rakan
Best Indian Act	
**Yo Yo Honey Singh**: Amit Trivedi; AR Rahman; Mithoon; Pritam	

=== Japan and Korea ===
Best Japanese Act	Best Korean Act
**Momoiro Clover Z**: Exile; Kyary Pamyu Pamyu; Miyavi; One Ok Rock	**EXO**: B.A.P; Boyfriend; Sistar; U-KISS

=== Southeast Asia, Mainland China, Hong Kong and Taiwan ===
Best Southeast Asian Act	Best Mainland China and Hong Kong Act
**My Tam**: Hafiz; Noah; Olivia Ong; Sarah Geronimo; Slot Machine	**Li Yuchun**: Eason Chan; Jane Zhang; Khalil Fong; Sun Nan
Best Taiwanese Act	
**Show Lo**: Jam Hsiao; JJ Lin; Rainie Yang; Vanness Wu	

=== Australia and New Zealand ===
Best Australian Act	Best New Zealand Act
**Cody Simpson**: Empire of the Sun; Flume; Iggy Azalea; Timomatic	**Lorde**: David Dallas; Shapeshifter; Stan Walker; The Naked and Famous

=== Latin America ===
Best Brazilian Act	Best Latin America North Act
**Fresno**: Emicida; P9; Pollo; Restart	**Paty Cantú**: Danna Paola; Jesse & Joy; León Larregui; Reik
Best Latin America Central Act	Best Latin America South Act
**Anna Carina**: Cali y El Dandee; Javiera Mena; Maluma; Pescao Vivo	**Airbag**: Illya Kuryaki and the Valderramas; No Te Va Gustar; Rayos Láser; Tan Biónica

=== North America ===
Best Canadian Act	Best US Act
**Justin Bieber**: Deadmau5; Drake; Tegan and Sara; The Weeknd	**Miley Cyrus**: Bruno Mars; Justin Timberlake; Macklemore & Ryan Lewis; Robin Thicke

== Worldwide nominations ==
Winners are in bold text.

Best Northern European Act	Best Southern European Act
**One Direction**: Admiral P; Avicii; Isac Elliot; Jimilian	**Marco Mengoni**: Auryn; Filipe Pinto; Demy; Shaka Ponk
Best Central European Act	Best Eastern European Act
**Lena**: Bastian Baker; Kensington; Stromae	**Bednarek**: Frenkie; Celeste Buckingham; Ivan & The Parazol; The Ultras; Smiley; Zemfira
Best Africa, Middle East and India Act	Best Japan and Korea Act
**Ahmed Soultan**: LCNVL; Yo Yo Honey Singh	**EXO**: Momoiro Clover Z
Best Southeast Asia, China, Hong Kong and Taiwan Act	Best Australia and New Zealand Act
**Li Yuchun**: Show Lo; My Tam	**Cody Simpson**: Lorde
Best Latin American Act	Best North American Act
**Fresno**: Anna Carina; Airbag; Paty Cantú	**Justin Bieber**: Miley Cyrus

== Performances ==
=== Pre show ===
Artist(s)	Song(s)
Pre-show
TR/ST	"Sulk/Capitol"
Ylvis	"The Fox (What Does the Fox Say?)"

=== Main show ===
Artist(s)	Song(s)
Main show
Miley Cyrus	"We Can't Stop"
Robin Thicke	"Blurred Lines" (with Iggy Azalea) "Feel Good"
Katy Perry	"Unconditionally"
Miley Cyrus	"Wrecking Ball"
Austin Mahone	"Banga Banga"
Kings of Leon	"Beautiful War"
Bruno Mars	"Gorilla"
Snoop Dogg; Afrojack	"Gin and Juice"
Eminem	"Berzerk" "Rap God"
The Killers	"Shot at the Night" "Mr. Brightside"
Imagine Dragons	"Radioactive"
Icona Pop	"I Love It"

== Appearances ==
=== Pre show ===
- Louise Roe and Laura Whitmore — Red carpet hosts
- Ellie Goulding — presented Best Look
- Dizzee Rascal — presented Biggest Fans

=== Main show ===
- Carice van Houten and Colton Haynes — presented Best Song
- Rita Ora — presented Best Hip-Hop
- Ellie Goulding — presented Best Alternative
- Bridgit Mendler and R.J. Mitte — presented Best Female
- Iggy Azalea and Ariana Grande — presented Best Male
- Jared Leto — presented Best Worldwide Act
- Will Ferrell (as Ron Burgundy) — presented Global Icon
- Will Ferrell — presented Best Video

== See also ==
- 2013 MTV Video Music Awards
