= Kudai =

Chilean pop rock band

- Kudai performing in 2024

Background information
- Origin: Santiago, Chile
- Genres: Latin pop; pop rock; emo pop; teen pop
- Years active: 2003–2010; 2016–present
- Labels: Sony Music; EMI; Capitol
- Spinoffs: Leamitié • Lillyput
- Spinoff of: Ciao
- Members: Nicole Natalino; Bárbara Sepúlveda; Pablo Holman; Tomás Manzi; Gabriela Villalba
- Website: kudailaberinto.com

Kudai are a Chilean pop rock band from Santiago, Chile, formed in 2003. The group is composed of Pablo Holman, Bárbara Sepúlveda, Tomás Manzi, and Nicole Natalino, who left the group in 2006 citing personal reasons, and was replaced by Ecuadorian Gabriela Villalba for three years. After the group disbanded in 2010, in November 2016, the band confirmed their return to the scene with the original members. In July 2024, the band made official its reunion with Gabriela Villalba, becoming a 5 person group.

Originally beginning their career as a kiddie band named CIAO, they rose to international fame when they changed their name and musical style with their debut album Vuelo (2004), which was a worldwide success, reaching triple platinum status in Chile, and selling over 500,000 copies worldwide. Their third studio album Nadha (2008) was nominated for Best Pop Album by Group or Duet at the 9th Annual Latin Grammy Awards, and was critically acclaimed. They are well known for hit songs, such as "Sin Despertar", "Ya Nada Queda", "Déjame Gritar", "Lejos De Aquí" and "Morir De Amor".

Kudai had a resounding commercial success in Latin America, and marked an entire generation with their musical style and lyricism. Often labeled by the media as an "emo band", a sobriquet based on their image, Kudai is characterized by lyrics about transcendental topics for youth such as depression, domestic violence, suicide, ecology, homosexuality and toxic relationships.

== History ==
=== 1999–2002: Ciao ===
Pablo Vega, a Mexican producer and manager based in Chile, formed a children's group called "Ciao" late 1999. Initially, the group included Nicole Natalino and Tomás Manzi, and later, Bárbara Sepúlveda, who auditioned, and replaced another girl who could not continue within the musical project. Finally, the group was formed by the fourth member, Pablo Holman, who joined "Ciao" by a reference, because his father is a well-known musician from Chile and acquaintance of Vega. The concept of "Ciao" consisted of a group of children each represented by a color –Pablo, blue; Barbara, fuchsia; Nicole, purple and Tomás, green – who performed Italian pop hits.

Ciao released their first and only album studio, El Poder de los Niños, early 2002 by EMI Odeón Chilena. Two singles from the album were promoted on Chilean radio stations, "Será Porque Te Amo" and "Mamma María", both of which contained its own music videos. For two years, Ciao made appearances on television shows, until the group transitioned into a teen concept.

=== 2003–2005: Foundation of Kudai, and Vuelo ===
The group began accepting song submissions and concentrating on performing original material in hopes of breaking out of its niche market. Their reinvention was complete after changing their name from CIAO to Kudai, which is derived from the Mapudungun (native Chilean language) word kudau, which according to the bandmembers means "young worker." In 2004 the group, now composed of four vocalists (Pablo, Tomas, Barbara, and Nicole), released its debut record, entitled Vuelo (Flight). Thanks to a string of successful singles, Vuelo soon achieved platinum record status. The group began its steady climb to the top with a Best New Artist nomination from MTV Latin American video music awards for their music video from the first single "Sin Despertar", quickly escalated to the first places of Chilean music rankings. Soon, they released their second single, "Ya Nada Queda", which achieved great success as did their third single, "Escapar". Vuelo went platinum in August 2005. Kudai was nominated for Best Artist—Central Region and Best New Artist—Central Region in the MTV Video Music Awards Latin America 2005. They released their first DVD, which included their 2004–2005 Tour, in September 2005 called En Vivo - Gira 2004–2005. The album was released in Mexico in July 2006 with a different cover with the same tracks. The album sold more than 500,000 copies worldwide.

=== 2006–2007: Sobrevive, their second studio album ===
In 2006, they recorded their second album Sobrevive, released on June 15, 2006. The album debuted at #1 in Chile as one of the most sold albums of the year and achieved gold status for selling over 15,000 copies. The album was released in 2007 in Mexico and sold more than 350,000 copies worldwide.

This album was the last record on which Nicole Natalino sang. She left the group due to personal problems and months later, Natalino sued Kudai's manager Pablo Vega for misappropriation of her salary as a band member. After the departure of Nicole, Gabriela Villalba replaced her and re-recorded the album featuring Gabriela's voice; this was released on September 26, 2007 in Chile. The album represented a drastic change in their style with a heavier sound and darker lyrics about anorexia, teenage pregnancy, drug addiction & suicide.

The first single is "Déjame Gritar" which reached #1 in Chile and Argentina. The video of the single features Nicole before her departure and also hit the #1 spot on many music video channels and programs in Latin America and reached #1 on MTV Latin America's TRL Los 10+ Pedidos in Argentina and Top 20. The second single is "Llévame". The video features Villalba and it was filmed in the Andes in Chile. This version of the record was promoted in Latinamerica. In addition to replacing Nicole, the track listing also changed. The song "Si He Tocado El Suelo" was removed and a new one titled "Tú" replaced it, becoming the first Kudai song originally recorded with Gabriela.

They also performed the theme for the MTV Latin America's show, Quiero mis Quince (English: My Super Sweet 16). The group won the MTV Latin American video music awards award for Best Pop Artist in 2006 and Best Central Artist in 2007, which they dedicated to both their fans and Nicole. After the success of the group, they were invited to the Viña del Mar Festival in February 2007. On October 2, 2007 the group released their first live album (fourth overall) called En Vivo: Desde Mexico.

=== 2008–2010: Nadha, separation ===
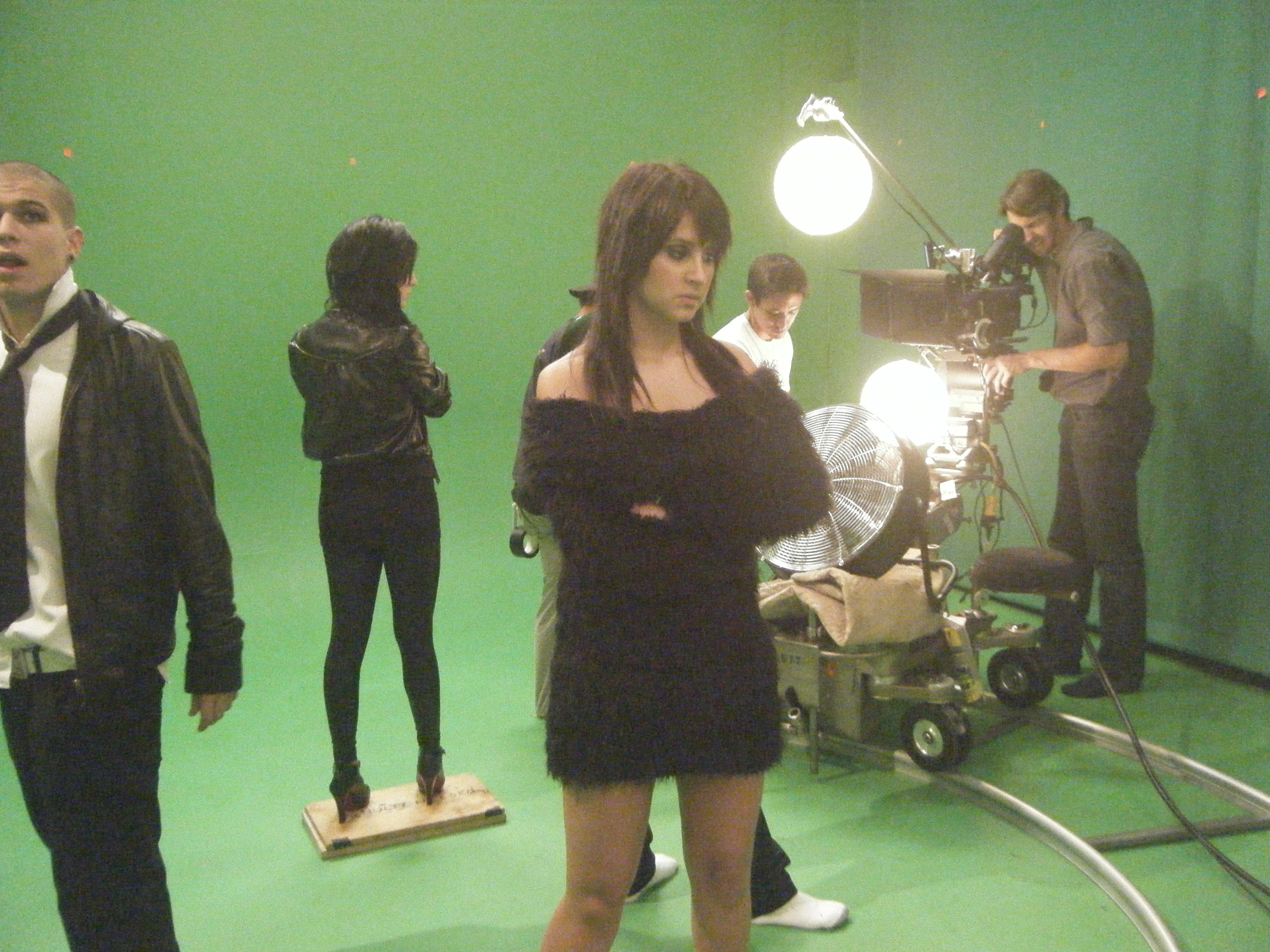
Kudai music video making of in 2008

Towards the end of 2006 they moved to Mexico to launch their international career and left Chile. Kudai closed their career in Chile when they played in the Festival de Viña del Mar, which was their last performance in the country for a while. In 2008, they recorded their third studio album called Nadha. The album has 12 songs, of which six were written by producer Koko Stambuk (ex-musician of Glup!). Three other songs are from producer Carlos Lara, who is considered to be the creator of RBD and has collaborated with musicians such as Lynda Thomas and Ricky Martin. Cathy Lean (ex-Mal Corazón), from Chile, also wrote two of the album's songs. Kudai chose to interpret the songs of Alanis Morissette and her band's bassist Eric Avery (ex-Jane's Addiction). The album was mastered at a Los Angeles studio, Igloo Music, under the direction of Gustavo Borner, who has worked with well-known artists such as Diego Torres, Ricky Martin, Sin Bandera, Phil Collins, Plácido Domingo and N'Sync, as well as working on the motion picture soundtracks of Rush Hour 2, Miami Vice and Finding Nemo.

Kudai band member Gabriela Villalba has said that this album is a turning point in Kudai's musical career:

"Now is the time that Kudai needs to show and prove many things because if we remain the same, we will be categorized as the teen band that will never grow. I feel that this third album is a very decisive stage for Kudai. We are going to fight to rid ourselves from the title of "the band that wants to be popular" and actually present good material."

The group appeared in one episode of Skimo and performed "Déjame Gritar". Their album Nadha was released on May 3, 2008 in all of Latin America. In Mexico it obtained gold certification. On May 12, 2008, Kudai premiered their new music video with the Mexican music group, RBD and Eiza González called "Estar Bien" (Be Well). The song is part of a campaign for obesity, anorexia, and bulimia awareness, and for being well, happy, and getting active in Mexico. The video shows the singers on a tour bus singing around Mexico City while citizens do various stretches and cardiovascular exercises. On August 5, 2008 the band debut in the United States market with their first album released there. On July 21, 2008 their second single of Nadha, "Nada Es Igual" was released in Latin America.

The album was nominated for "Best Pop Album by Group or Duet" at the Latin Grammy Awards held at the Toyota Center in Houston, Texas on November 13, 2008.

In January 2009, they released an exclusive single for Chile, called "Hoy Quiero" with moderate success. On January 22, 2009, they released as a single the song "Ladrando a La Luna" for the 2008 Disney movie Bolt.

In August 2009, Kudai initially announced a 2 year hiatus, allowing its members to involve in solo projects and go to college, denying any rumours about the band disbanding. However, during the spring of 2010 the band announced a farewell tour, which got cancelled due to personal issues among the band's members and financial issues with the band's management, leading to Kudai officially disbanding in 2010.

Pablo Holman stayed and naturalized in Mexico, forming the punk rock band "Lillyput", and also became a part of Mexican metal bands "Entertain the Beast" as their bass guitar player and "Astro Rain" as their vocalist and guitar player, Tomas Manzi returned to Chile and kept studying music, became a DJ and involved in the backstage side of the music industry by doing activities such as light technicism, Barbara Sepulveda also returned to Chile to enroll in college and got a major in orthodontics, both Tomas and Barbara formed the duet "Amitie", Gabriela Villalba moved to the United States and became an activist for eating disorders and launched a solo career.

=== 2016-2023: Reunion ===
In November 2016, the band announced their comeback with the original line-up, as former member Nicole Natalino confirmed the reunion with their bandmates after a decade of leaving the band. They released the song "Aquí Estaré" during the spring of 2017 as their comeback anthem, and their 4th album "Laberinto" was released during the first half of 2019, being their first studio album after more than a decade of releasing their last album, portraying Natalino's vocals again.

In 2021, they released their 5th album "Revuelo", which consists of re-recordings of some of their biggest hits through their history, celebrating their 20th anniversary, including "Sin Despertar", "Ya Nada Queda", "Escapar" and some of their most important songs in a modern synth pop style, moving away from their earlier pop rock sound and dark aesthetics.

=== 2024: Revive and new lineup ===
In July 2024, Kudai announced through their Instagram page that they were reuniting with ecuadorian singer Gabriela Villalba after 14 years of not performing with her, becoming a 5 person group for the first time in their career. Kudai announced the "Revive" Tour including this new lineup, they also announced new music and a new album.

The band released the single "Karma" in February 2025, a pop-rock song that returns to their heavier sound and aesthetics and is the first Kudai song that features both Nicole and Gabriela's vocals.

== Members ==
=== Current members ===
- Pablo Holman – vocals, occasionally guitars (1999–2009; 2016–present)
- Bárbara Sepúlveda – vocals (1999–2009; 2016–present)
- Tomás Manzi – vocals (1999–2009; 2016–present)
- Nicole Natalino – vocals (1999–2006; 2016–present)
- Gabriela Villalba – vocals (2006–2009; 2024–present)

== Discography ==
Studio albums

- Vuelo (2004)
- Sobrevive (2006)
- Nadha (2008)
- Laberinto (2019)
- Revuelo (2021)

== Tours ==
Years	Number of dates	Title
2004–2005	25	En Vivo - Gira 2004-2005
2006-2008	50	Sobrevive Latin American Tour
2008-2009	Unknown	Nadha Latin America Tour
2009	Unknown	Gira Latinoamericana Movistar (con Amaia Montero)
2007-2018	Unknown	Gira El Reencuentro
2019	Unknown	Lluvia de Fuego Tour
2023-2024	Unknown	Revuelo Tour
2024	Unknown	Tour Vuelo 2024
2024	8	Showcase for Fans Mexican Tour
2024-2025	Unknown	Revive Tour

== Awards and nominations ==
=== Latin Grammy Awards ===
A Latin Grammy Award is an accolade by the Latin Academy of Recording Arts & Sciences to recognize outstanding achievement in the music industry. Kudai earned one nomination.

Year	Nominee / work	Award	Result
2008	Nadha	Best Pop Album by a Duo or Group with Vocals	Nominated

=== Los Premios MTV Latinoamérica ===
Los Premios MTV Latinoamérica or VMALA's is the Latin American version of the Video Music Awards. Kudai won five awards from sixteen nominations.

Year	Nominee / work	Award	Result
2005	Kudai	Best New Artist — Central	Nominated
2005	Kudai	Best Artist — Central	Nominated
2006	Kudai	Breakthrough Artist	Nominated
2006	Kudai	Best Pop Artist	Won
2006	Kudai	Best Artist — Central	Nominated
2007	Kudai	Artist of the Year	Nominated
2007	Kudai	Best Group or Duet	Nominated
2007	Kudai	Best Artist — Central	Won
2007	Pablo Holman	Fashionista — Male	Won
2008	Kudai	Best Group or Duet	Won
2008	Kudai	Best Pop Artist	Won
2008	Kudai	Best Artist — Central	Nominated
2008	Gabriela Villalba	Fashionista — Female	Nominated
2008	Kudai (President: Martín Torrilla)	Best Fan Club	Nominated
2009	Kudai	Artist of the Year	Nominated
2009	Kudai	Best Artist — Central	Nominated

=== Los Premios 40 Principales ===
Los Premios 40 Principales, is an award show by the musical radio station Los 40 Principales created in 2006 to celebrate the fortieth anniversary of its founding. Kudai won one award from two nominations.

Year	Nominee / work	Award	Result
2007	Kudai	Chilean Act	Won
2008	Kudai	Chilean Act	Nominated

=== Orgullosamente Latino Award ===
The Orgullosamente Latino Awards are accolades first awarded in 2004 for the best in Latin music. They were created by Alexis Núñes Oliva, Executive Producer of Ritmoson Latino, the Mexico-based music television channel through which the awards are broadcast each year. Kudai won two awards from four nominations.

Year	Nominee / work	Award	Result
2006	Kudai	Latin Group of the Year	Won
2007	Kudai	Latin Group of the Year	Nominated
2009	Kudai	Latin Group of the Year	Won
2009	Lejos De Aquí	Latin Music Video of the Year	Nominated

=== Premios Oye! ===
Premios Oye! (Premio Nacional a la Música Grabada) are presented annually by the Academia Nacional de la Música en México for outstanding achievements in the Mexican record industry. Kudai received one award from two nominations.

Year	Nominee / work	Award	Result
2008	Nadha	Best Pop by a Duo/Group	Nominated
2008	Lejos De Aquí	Best Song with a Message	Won
