= Gabriela Villalba =

Ecuadorian singer and actress (born 1984)

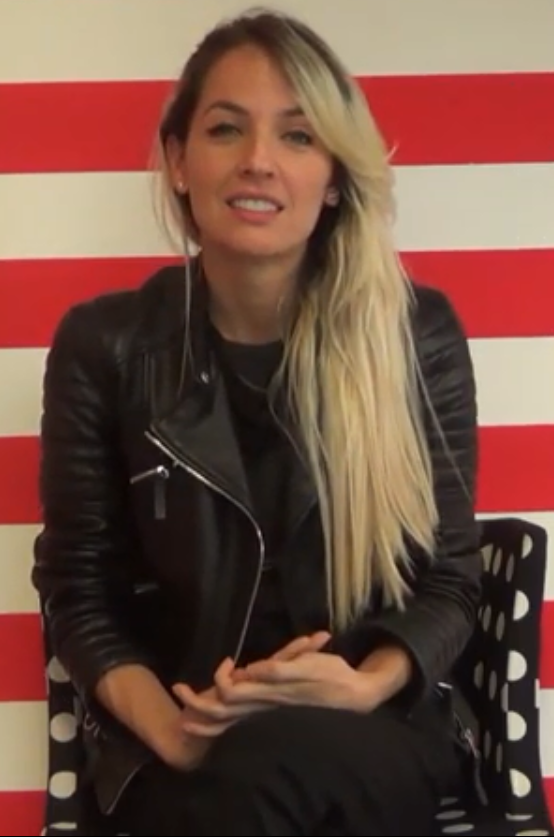

Background information
- Also known as: Gaby de K
- Born: María Gabriela Villalba Jervis; 20 September 1984 (age 41)
- Origin: Quito, Ecuador
- Genres: Pop; dance-pop; pop rock
- Member of: Kiruba; Kudai

María Gabriela Villalba Jervis (born September 21, 1984, in Quito, Ecuador) is an Ecuadorian singer and actress. She is also known as Gaby de K. K refers to Kiruba and Kudai, two musical bands she is a member of.

== Biography ==
=== Early life ===
Gabriela Villalba was born in Quito, Ecuador on September 20, 1984. Her full birth name is María Gabriela Villalba Jervis. Her nickname is Gaby and she has seven brothers: Juan Carlos, Ricardo, Diego, Sandra, Mateo, Tiago and Alessandro. Her parents are Juan Carlos Villalba and Paulina Jervis. Gabriela studied at Jacques Cousteau High School in Guangopolo, a rural community outside of Quito. Gaby started in world of media by doing TV commercials at a very young age. Her solo album was released in 2011.

=== Kiruba ===
Her fame stardom started when she was chosen to participate in the Ecuadorian version of the reality show Popstars. She won and became a part of the best selling Ecuadorian girl band Kiruba. They sold 20,000 copies of their debut album. The band lasted two years after that, recording two studio albums Kiruba and Baila La Luna.

=== TV star and solo career ===
After the disintegration of the group in 2005, Gabriela starred in a Colombian soap opera entitled Al Ritmo De Tu Corazón (To The Rhythm Of Your Heart), where she also sang and composed the main theme song for the show. Several producers offered her an opportunity to launch her career as a soloist.

Villalba released her debut album Todo Bien (Everything's Fine) in 2005. Her first and only single "Me Doy Vueltas" ("I Turn In Circles") became a moderate hit in Ecuador.

==== Todo Bien (Everything's Fine) track list ====
1. Un Contacto ("A Contact")
2. Todo Bien ("Everything's Fine")
3. Me Doy Vueltas ("I Turn In Circles")
4. Vuelve A Mí ("Come Back To Me")
5. Tantos Besos ("Lots Of Kisses")
6. Eres Linda ("You're a Beautiful Girl")
7. Soñaré ("I'll Dream")
8. Dame Tu Mano ("Give Me Your Hand")
9. Sin Palabras ("Wordless")
10. Quisiera ("I Wish")

=== Kudai ===
On May 30, 2006, in Quito, Radio Exa invited Gaby to be the opening act of Chilean pop rock band Kudai while the group was touring in Ecuador. Kudai's manager was amazed by Villalba's vocals and decided to ask her to temporarily replace one of the absent singers.

One month later, Nicole Natalino made public her departure from Kudai, and in August 2006 Gabriela officially became part of the group.

Kudai disbanded in 2010. Six years later, the band made a comeback with only its original members. In 2024, Kudai reunited with Villalba, becoming a 5 people band for the first time in their history.

== Discography ==
=== Albums ===
Album Information
Kiruba with Kiruba
- Released: 2003
- Label: MTM Records
- Peak Ecuador: #1 (Latin America)
- Sales: 20,000+
- Certifications: Double Platinum (ECU)
- Official singles:
  - "Quisiera" ("I Wish")
    - #1 Ecuador
    - #13 Colombia
    - #15 Perú
    - #16 Bolivia
    - #21 Chile
  - "Camina" ("I Walk")
    - #1 Ecuador
    - #32 Colombia
    - #56 Perú
  - "Como Extraño Tu Luz" ("How I'm Missing Your Light")
    - #2 Ecuador
    - #61 Perú
  - "Me Pierdo" ("Lose Myself")
    - #1 Ecuador
Album Information
Baila La Luna (Dance The Moon) with Kiruba
- Released: 2004
- Label: MTM Records
- Peak Ecuador: #1 (Latin America)
- Sales: 5,000+
- Certifications: Gold (ECU)
- Official singles:
  - "Me Quedo Contigo" ("I Stay With You")
    - #1 Ecuador
Album Information
Todo Bien (Everything's Fine)
- Released: 2005
- Label: MTM Records
- Peak Ecuador: #1 (Latin America)
- Sales: 3,000+
- Certifications: Gold (ECU)
- Official singles:
  - "Me Doy Vueltas" ("I Turn In Circles")
    - #1 Ecuador
    - #26 Colombia
    - #42 Bolivia
Album Information
Maletas en la Puerta (Suitcases at the Door)
- Released: TBA
- Official singles:
  - "Psycho" ("Psycho")
  - "Adrenalina" ("Adrenalin")
  - "París" ("Paris")
  - "Imposible" ("Impossible")
Sobrevive (re-release)
- Released: September 26, 2006
- Label: EMI
- Chilean Sales: 53,000+
- Certifications: Gold (CL)
Nadha
- Released: May 13th, 2008
- Label: EMI
- Certifications: Platinum (CL), Gold (MX)
- Official Singles: Lejos de Aquí, Nada es Igual, Morir de Amor, Disfraz
Grandes Éxitos
- Released: June 9th, 2010
- Label EMI
- Official Singles: Nuestros Destinos

== See also ==
- Kiruba
- Kudai
- Popstars
