= Verde70 =

Ecuadorian musical group

- Origin: Quito, Ecuador
- Genres: Rock, pop rock, punk pop, power pop, indie rock
- Years active: 1999–2007, 2012–present
- Labels: Independent
- Members: Darío Castro, César Galarza, Bastián Napolitano, Diego Saa, María Buendía

Verde70 (Green70) is a music group from Quito, Ecuador. Verde70 started in 1999 with band members Dario Castro (vocals and guitar) David Arízaga (drums) and Diego Saa (backup vocals and bass guitar). The group achieved widespread fame across the country, in 2000, when they released Alegre Depresion, their first album, which made a breakthrough in the Ecuador's music scene.

For Ruta Melancolia, their second album, Cesar Galarza joined the group (guitar).

Their best time, they remember, was in 2004. In that year, they were the first Ecuadorian band invited to the Grammy Awards as well as touring throughout the country. It was precisely in those years when 'Verde' could not be missing from the most important schools of Quito and also marked the generations that were born in the 80s and 90s and, at that time, were between 15 and 20 years old.

They disbanded in 2008. Dario Castro and David Arizaga pursued a solo careers and Diego Saa relocated to Florida and formed the group La Gente Naranja (The Orange People).

In 2012, in mid-October, the band returns to the ring, Verde 70, one of the main and most recognized groups of the Ecuadorian music scene, confirms its return for this year. Recharged with all the energy and Rock and Roll that always characterized them, César Galarza (Guitarist-producer) and Darío Castro (Composer-vocalist) decided to return together again to the stages and present their most recent musical proposal. Bastián Napolitano (drums) and Christian Dreyer (bass and choruses) are the new talents that will be presented later this year, as the brand new official members of the band. After finishing the "Seguimos Verdes" tour, Christian Dreyer leaves the band for personal projects, and the initial bassist Diego Saa is reinstated.

Verde70 is considered as one of the most influential and successful groups in the history of Ecuador.

== Discography and highlights ==
- Alegre Depresión (Jolly Depression 2000)

List of songs

1. Un minuto

2. Me tienes me puedes me dueles

3. La verdad

4. Alegre Depresión

5.Muriendo por tu amor

6. Palabras

7. Azul

8. No es tan fácil

9. Esta noche

10. Irremediablemente tarde

11. La lluvia

- Ruta Melancolía (Melancholy Route, 2003)

List of songs

1. No puedo estar sin ti(1999)

2. Estoy bien

3. Que distintos tu y yo

4. En la inmensidad

5. A mil kilómetros

6. Ayer...tal vez

7. Fuiste tu

8. Como pez en la arena

9. Cuando estoy contigo

10. Un Año después

11. Gente que viene y va

- Con Cierto Cuidado (Live, 2006)

List of songs

Con Cierto Cuidado - DISCO 1

1. Intro - En la Inmensidad

2. Como Pez En La Arena

3. Un Minuto

4. Ruta Melancolía (a 1000 km)

5. Cuando Estoy Contigo

6. Me Tienes, Me Puedes, Me Dueles

7. Un Año Después

8. Palabras (Versión Rhodes)

9. Irremediablemente Tarde

10. Ni Para Ti, Ni Para Nadie

11. Presentación Verde 70

12. No Puedo Estar Sin Ti

Con Cierto Cuidado - DISCO 2

1. Fuiste Tu

2. Que Distintos Tu y Yo

3. Ni Para Ti, Ni Para Nadie (Versión Estudio)

- La edad de la Cebra (The age of the Zebra, 2015)

List of songs

1. Parodia

2. Nada

3. Alas Al Viento

4. Tanto ganas, tanto pierdes. (versión del tema del disco en solitario de Darío Castro -Naturaleza Humana-)

5. Soledad

6. Últimamente

7. Ten Cuidado!

8. Dirección

9. Invierno

10. Tiempo
