= Los Premios MTV Latinoamérica 2008 =

- Date: October 16, 2008
- Location: Auditorio Telmex in Guadalajara
- Country: Mexico
- Hosted by: N/A
- Preshow host(s): Don Tetto; Emmanuel Horvilleur; The Kooks
- Act(s): Belanova; Café Tacuba; Calle 13; Juanes; Julieta Venegas; Katy Perry; Kudai; Los Fabulosos Cadillacs; Metallica; Moderatto; Nortec Collective; Paramore; Tokio Hotel; Ximena Sariñana; Zoé

The seventh annual Premios MTV Latinoamérica 2008 took place on October 16, 2008 in Guadalajara, Mexico at the Auditorio Telmex for the first time.

Jose Tillan was the Executive Producer of the event.

== Nominations ==
Winners are in bold text

=== Artist of the Year ===
- Babasónicos
- Belanova
- Café Tacuba
- **Juanes**
- Miranda!

=== Video of the Year ===
- Babasónicos — "Pijamas"
- **Belanova — "One, Two, Three, Go! (1, 2, 3, Go!)"**
- Café Tacuba — "Esta Vez"
- Juanes — "Me Enamora"
- Motel — "Uno, Dos, Tres"

=== Song of the Year ===
- Jonas Brothers — "When You Look Me in the Eyes"
- Juanes — "Me Enamora"
- Julieta Venegas — "El Presente"
- Katy Perry — "I Kissed a Girl"
- **Tokio Hotel — "Monsoon"**

=== Best Solo Artist ===
- Diego
- Emmanuel Horvilleur
- Gustavo Cerati
- **Juanes**
- Ximena Sariñana

=== Best Group or Duet ===
- Babasónicos
- Belanova
- Café Tacuba
- **Kudai**
- Miranda!

=== Best Pop Artist ===
- Belanova
- Jesse & Joy
- **Kudai**
- Miranda!
- Ximena Sariñana

=== Best Rock Artist ===
- Babasónicos
- Gustavo Cerati
- **Juanes**
- Moderatto
- Motel

=== Best Alternative Artist ===
- **Café Tacuba**
- Emmanuel Horvilleur
- Kinky
- Molotov
- Zoé

=== Best Pop Artist — International ===
- Amy Winehouse
- Fergie
- **Jonas Brothers**
- Madonna
- Rihanna

=== Best Rock Artist — International ===
- **Thirty Seconds to Mars**
- Coldplay
- Fall Out Boy
- Panic! at the Disco
- Paramore

=== Best New Artist — International ===
- Alizée
- Jonas Brothers
- Katy Perry
- Paramore
- **Tokio Hotel**

=== Best Artist — North ===
- **Belanova**
- Café Tacuba
- Motel
- Ximena Sariñana
- Zoé

=== Best Artist — Central ===
- Doctor Krápula
- Don Tetto
- **Juanes**
- Kudai
- Los Bunkers

=== Best Artist — South ===
- Andrés Calamaro
- Babasónicos
- Catupecu Machu
- Emmanuel Horvilleur
- **Miranda!**

=== Breakthrough Artist ===
- Don Tetto
- El Bordo
- Johanna Carreño
- Shaila
- **Ximena Sariñana**

=== Promising Artist ===
- Esto es Eso
- **Infierno 18**
- Insite
- Le Baron
- Smitten

=== Fashionista Award — Female ===
- Denisse Guerrero (from Belanova)
- Gabriela Villalba (from Kudai)
- Hayley Williams (from Paramore)
- Katy Perry
- **Rihanna**

=== Fashionista Award — Male ===
- Alejandro Sergi (from Miranda!)
- Bill Kaulitz (from Tokio Hotel)
- Jay de la Cueva (from Moderatto)
- **Joe Jonas** (from the Jonas Brothers)
- José "Pepe" Madero (from Panda)

=== Best Fan Club ===
- Thirty Seconds to Mars (President: Iris Delgado)
- Babasónicos (President: Juan Laborda)
- Belanova (President: Luis Nazario)
- Jonas Brothers (President: Miguel Alejandro Villa Renteria)
- Kudai (President: Martín Torrilla)
- **Tokio Hotel (President: Fátima Acosta)**

=== Best Video Game Soundtrack ===
- FIFA 08
- Grand Theft Auto IV
- **Guitar Hero III: Legends of Rock**
- Need for Speed: ProStreet
- Rock Band

=== Best Ringtone ===
- Jonas Brothers — "When You Look Me in the Eyes"
- Juanes — "Tres"
- Julieta Venegas — "El Presente"
- Madonna — "4 Minutes"
- **Tokio Hotel — "Monsoon"**

=== Best Music Film ===
- Across the Universe
- Control
- I'm Not There
- Shine a Light
- **U2 3D**

=== Best Reunion Tour ===
- **Soda Stereo**
- The Police

=== La Zona de Combate ===
- **Moving On**
- Pinkat
- Toke Rosa

=== MTV Legend Award ===
- **Los Fabulosos Cadillacs**

== Performances ==
=== Pre-show ===
- Emmanuel Horvilleur — "Radios"
- Don Tetto — "Ha Vuelto a Suceder"
- The Kooks — "Do You Wanna"

=== Main show ===
- Julieta Venegas (featuring Nortec Collective) — "El Presente"
- Tokio Hotel — "Monsoon" and "Ready, Set, Go"
- Paramore — "That's What You Get"
- Los Fabulosos Cadillacs — "La Luz del Ritmo" and "Matador" (live from Argentina)
- Café Tacuba and Calle 13 (featuring Ileana Cabra) — "Vámonos" / "No Hay Nadie Como Tú"
- Juanes — "Odio Por Amor"
- Katy Perry — "I Kissed a Girl"
- Belanova — "One, Two, Three, Go! (1, 2, 3, Go!)"
- Zoé and Ximena Sariñana — "Reptilectric" / "Vidas Paralelas"
- Moderatto and Kudai — "Ya Lo Veía Venir" / "Lejos De Aquí"
- Metallica — "The Day That Never Comes"
- Moving On — "AudioRomance"

== Appearances ==
- Tila Tequila — presented Best Solo Artist
- The Dudesons — introduced Paramore
- Hayley Williams (from Paramore) — introduced Los Fabulosos Cadillacs
- Kim Kardashian, Brian Amadeus and Xavi (from Moderatto) — presented Song of the Year and introduced the next presenters
- Flavor Flav and Alejandra Guzmán — presented Best Pop Artist and introduced Café Tacuba
- Ana Claudia Talancón and Babasónicos — presented Best Rock Artist — International and introduced the next presenters
- Arturo Hernández and Gonzalo Morales — presented Best Fan Club and introduced Juanes
- Miranda! — introduced Juanes with Arturo and Gonzalo
- Eglantina Zingg — interviewed Gene Simmons in a segment before commercials
- Gene Simmons — introduced Katy Perry
- Ximena Sariñana, José Madero (from Panda) and Dante Spinetta — presenting Best Alternative Artist
- Andrés López — presented Belanova with The Dudesons
- Katy Perry and René Pérez (from Calle 13) — introduced Thirty Seconds to Mars
- Thirty Seconds to Mars — presented Video of the Year
- Ruth Infarinato and Alejandro Lacroix — introduced Zoé, Ximena Sariñana, Mario Pergolini, Kudai and Moderatto (in three separate instances)
- Mario Pergolini — presented the MTV Legend Award
- Molotov — presented Artist of the Year
- Juanes — introduced Metallica
- Dante Spinetta — introduced Moving On

== Memorable Moments ==
- While performing "I Kissed a Girl", Katy Perry jumped on a fake cake and when she tried to get up she slipped several times. She crawled off the stage.
