= Omar Basaad =

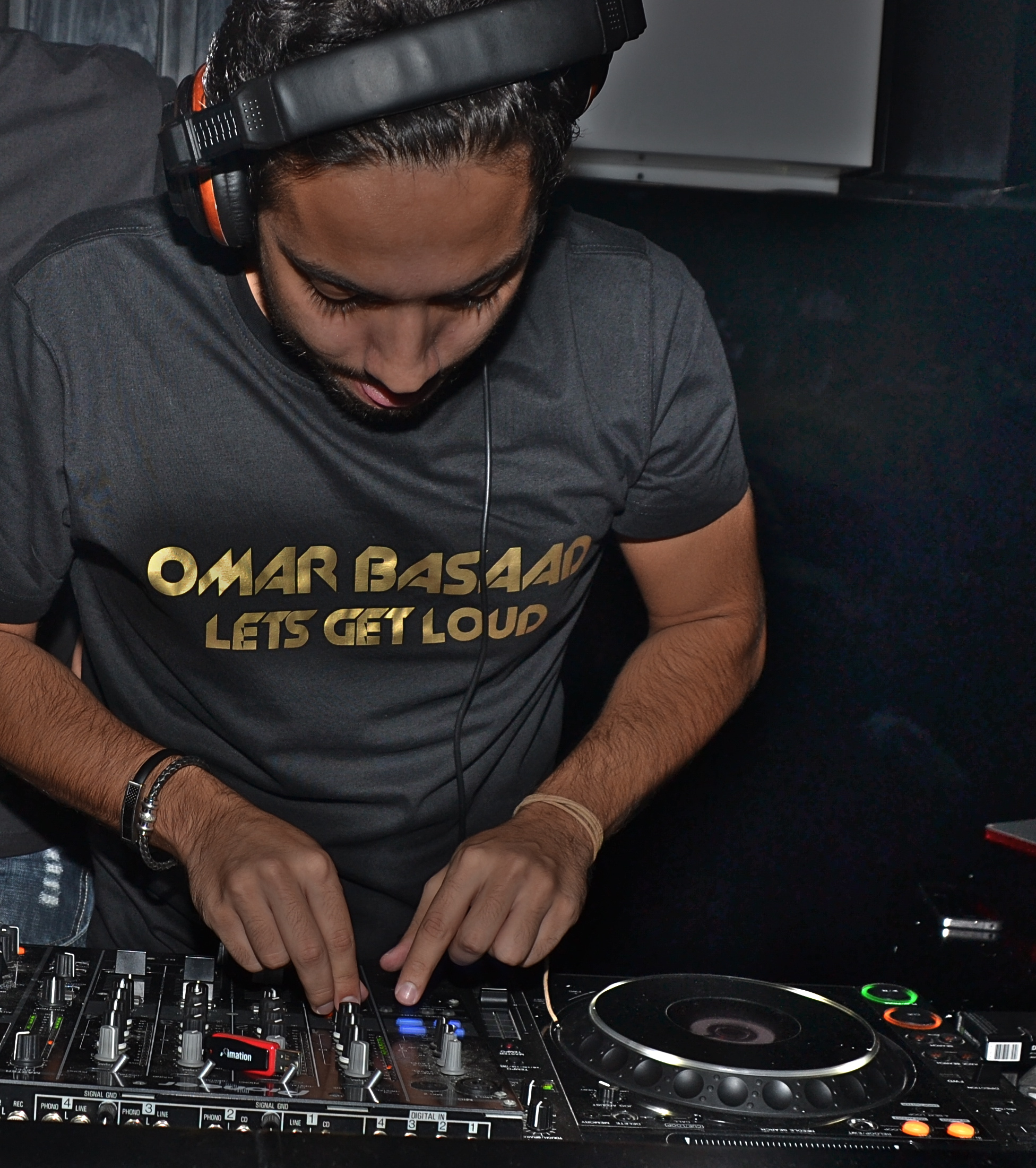
- Omar Basaad in 2012

Background information
- Born: Omar Basaad; December 21, 1988 (age 37); Jeddah, Saudi Arabia
- Genres: House, Pop, Hip-hop,
- Occupations: Record producer, Songwriter
- Instruments: Keyboard, synthesizer
- Years active: 2007-present
- Website: www.omarbasaad.com

Omar Basaad (born 21 December 1988) is a Saudi Arabian, record producer, and record label owner and A DJ .

== History ==
Basaad was born in Jeddah, Saudi Arabia He spent his teenage years producing music in Saudi Arabia, Turkey and England with his first official remix released in 2008 with Tarkan. He is the first Arab to release the world's first Arabic Dubstep track on beatport.

Omar Basaad is owner and founder of his own record label, Coexist Records. He was chosen as the best Saudi DJ and Electronic Dance Music Producer in 2012, by Saudi Gazette. He became the first official Saudi EDM (Electronic Dance Music) producer to represent Saudi Arabia internationally.

== Discography ==
=== Singles ===
- 2009 – Nehayitna (Featuring Hanna)
- 2009 – Beirut
- 2009 – Sweet pain (Featuring Hanna)
- 2010 – Knt ahlami (Featuring Lamar)
- 2010 – Violinchello
- 2010 – Dayman Gambi
- 2011 – To The Beat [Future] (Featuring Ayzee) [Loud Recordings]
- 2011 – AR
- 2011 - Theme Of Life (Featuring Ayzee) [Loud Recordings]
- 2012 – La Chants [Loud Recordings]
- 2012 - Nehyitna Eh (Featuring Hanna & Hugeative) [Dupstep Deluxe Edition] [Loud Recordings]
- 2012 - Let It Go (Featuring Ameera Ali)
- 2013 - Power 88 [Loud Recordings]
- 2013 - Power 88 (Featuring Cody) (Vocal Mix) [Loud Recordings]
- 2013 - Gamma [Loud Recordings]
- 2014 - Hojan [Loud Recordings]
- 2014 - Sweet Pain (Featuring Hanna) [Moonbeam Remix]
- 2014 - Exist [Belushi Records]
- 2014 - 2 Love (Featuring Alicia Madison)
- 2015 - Revenge [Coexist]
- 2015 - Be You (Featuring Jova Radevka) [Coexist Records]
- 2015 - Someone Else (Featuring Mickey Shiloh) [Coexist Records]
- 2015 - Why Do We Run (Featuring Karra)
- 2016 - Never Surrender (Featuring Stef Lang)
- 2016 - Trash Love
- 2016 - Mov/es
- 2017 - Remain (Featuring Nick Gray) [Coexist Records]
- 2018 - Ride The Wave (Featuring Xiyohn & A'Y) [Coexist Records]
- 2018 - Braap [Coexist Records]
- 2018 - Violet [Coexist Records]
- 2018 - S O B (Featuring Xiyohn & Moh Flow & A'Y) [Coexist Records]
- 2018 - Ludo (Featuring Minz & Xiyohn) [Coexist Records]
- 2019 - Buzz Light (Featuring PsychoYP) [Coexist Records]
- 2019 - Mona Lisa (Featuring Ayüü & MARV OTM) [Coexist Records]
- 2020 - Technicolor [Coexist Records]
- 2020 - Without You [Coexist Records]
- 2020 - Contra El Mundo (Featuring Baad Bad) [Coexist Records]
- 2021 - Busy Body (Featuring Emmy Jhay) [Coexist Records]

=== Blues Away (EP) 2019 ===
Track Listing

- 1- Omar Basaad - iGen
- 2- Omar Basaad - The Need
- 3- Omar Basaad - Darlin (Featuring Xiyohn)
- 4- Omar Basaad - Mona Lisa (Featuring Ayüü & MARV OTM)
- 5- Omar Basaad - Heart For Sale (Featuring Young Jae)
- 6- Omar Basaad - Fall (Featuring Jae Noir)

=== Dichotomy (EP) 2017 ===
Track Listing

- 1- Omar Basaad - 6612
- 2- Omar Basaad - Can't Let Go (Featuring Camreyn)
- 3- Omar Basaad - Good Vibes Only (Featuring A'Y)
- 4- Omar Basaad - Sol
- 5- Omar Basaad - Emblem

=== Vega (EP) 2012 ===
Track listing

- 1- Omar Basaad Feat. Thallie Ann Seenyen - Castles On Fire (Original Mix)
- 2- Omar Basaad - 3 Minutes To Rave (Original Mix)
- 3- Omar Basaad - Zone 1 (Original Mix)
- 4- Omar Basaad - Vega (Original Mix)
- 5- Omar Basaad Feat. Thallie Ann Seenyen - Castles On Fire (Hugeative Remix)
- 6- Omar Basaad Feat. Thallie Ann Seenyen - Castles On Fire (Serhan Solcum Remix)

=== Remixes ===
- 2008 – Tarkan – Vay Anam Vay [DMC Music]
- 2010 – Abdil Fatah Al Gereni – Eba Eftekerni [Platinum Records]
- 2010 – Christian Aguilera – Not My Self Tonight
- 2010 – Abdil Fatah Al Gereni – Bahib Ashoufak [Platinum Records]
- 2011 – Mohammed Al Zaylai – Wein Ayamak [Platinum Records]
- 2011 – Abdil Fatah Al Gereni – Ahla Mafi Al Donya [Platinum Records]
- 2011 – Rashed Al Majed – Gal Al Weda3 [Platinum Records]
- 2012 – Abbas Ibrahem – Kil Sa3a [Rotana]
- 2013 - 3lau & Paris & Simo Feat. Bright Lights - Escape (Omar Basaad Remix)
- 2015 - Jean Marie Riachi - Sahara Al Arab (Omar Basaa Remix) [Sony Music]
- 2017 - French Montana - Unforgettable (Feat. Swae Lee) [Omar Basaad Remix] (Epic Records)
