= TK (Peruvian rock band) =

Peruvian pop rock band

- Genres: Pop rock
- Years active: 2001–present
- Members: Diego Dibos Emilio Pérez Carlos Lescano Christopher Farfan Edgar Guerra

TK is a Peruvian pop rock band formed in 2001 by Emilio Pérez and Edgar Guerra. Later Christopher Farfán, Diego Dibós and Carlos Lescano joined them to form TK.

In 2002 Sony Music awarded TK with Gold and Silver discs for sales of their album in Peru.

In 2003 TK and Zen, both Peruvian rock bands, were nominated by MTV for the award of Best New Central American Artist. TK won.

In 2004, their most recent album, Tentando Imaginarios, was released, with the hit single "Buscama." Other hit songs from the album are "Ilusión," "Alas Cortadas" and "Inminente Conjunción."

In 2005, TK made the soundtrack for the animated movie Piratas en el Callao. The song "La Juerga Pirata" was the main hit of the soundtrack.

In 2006, June, they announced their separation, but in November, guitarist, Emilio Pérez de Armas reformed the band with new members.

In 2007 they released their 3rd album, "Nucleo" with the lead single "Fragmentos".

== Members ==
- Diego Dibos (Vocals)
- Emilio Pérez (keyboards)
- Carlos Lescano (Bass)
- Christopher Farfan (Drums)
- Edgar Guerra (Guitar)

== Past members ==
- Miguel Ginocchio (keyboards)
- Juan Francisco Escobar (drums) (2007)
- Andrés Bretel (bass) (2007)
- Fergan Chavez-Ferrer Herrera (guitar) (2007)

== Albums ==
- Trece (2002)
- Tentando Imaginarios (2004)
- Soundtrack: Piratas en el Callao (2005)
- Nucleo (2007)
- Equidistante (2017)
- Inminente conjunción (2020)

== Singles ==
From "Trece":

- "Inminente conjunción" (2002)
- "Alas cortadas" (2002)
- "A Lina" (2002)
- "Aquellos que nunca quisieron" (2003)
- "Buscando la victoria" (2003)

From "Tentando Imaginarios":

- "Abril" (2004)
- "Ilusión" (2004)
- "Buscama" (2005)

From "Nucleo":

- "Fragmentos" (2007)

From "Equidistante":

- "Si te vas" (2017)

Other:

- "La Juerga Pirata" (from "Los Piratas del Callao" Soundtrack) (2005)
