= Nicole Natalino =

Chilean singer (born 1989)

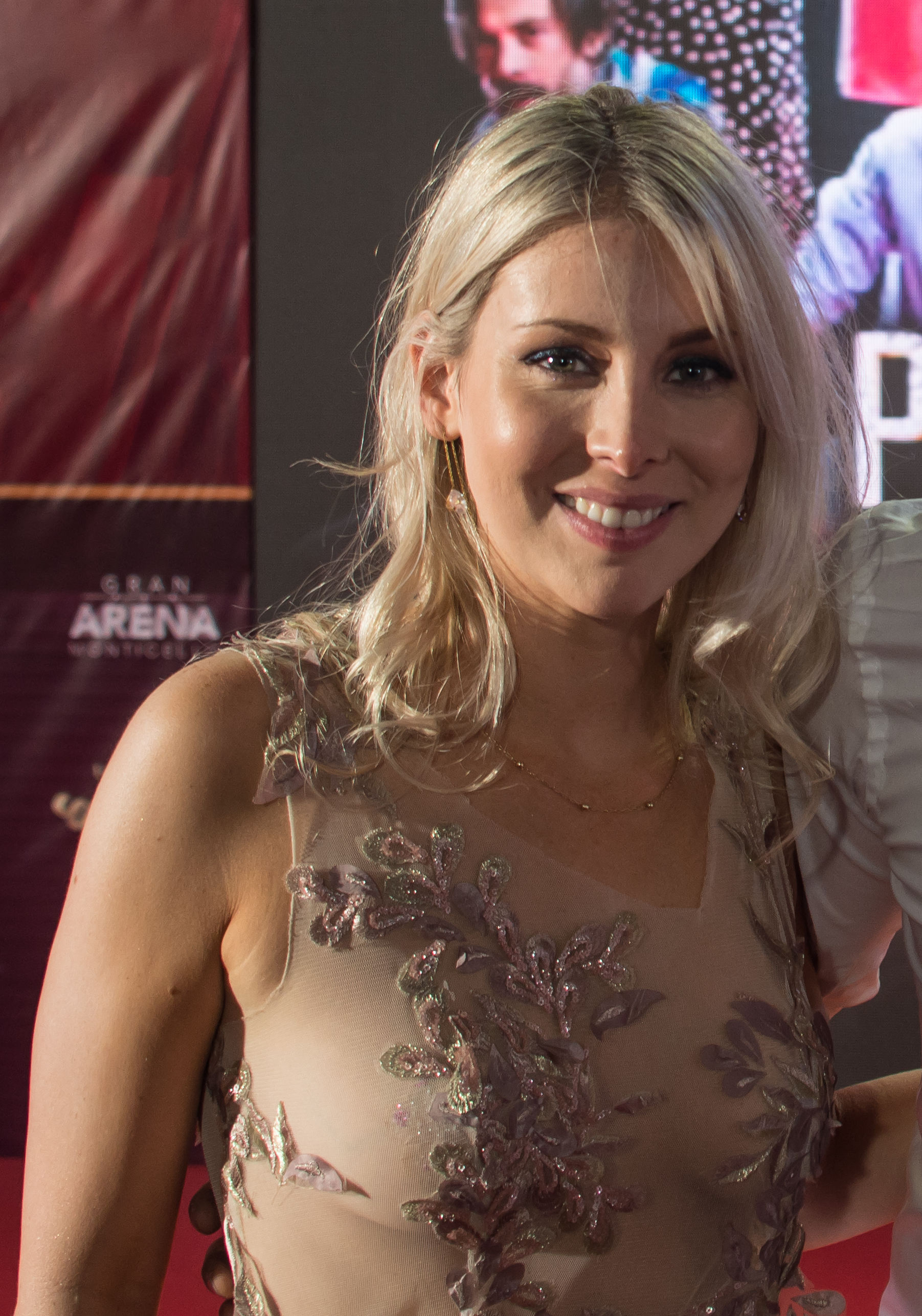
- Natalino in 2018

Background information
- Born: Nicole Monserrat Natalino Torres; 5 March 1989 (age 37); Santiago, Chile
- Genres: Pop; pop rock
- Occupations: Singer; songwriter; interior designer
- Instruments: Vocals; guitar
- Years active: 1999–present
- Label: Feria Music
- Website: nicolenatalino.com

Nicole Monserrat Natalino Torres (born 5 March 1989) is a Chilean singer who is a current member of Chilean pop rock band Kudai (previously known as Ciao). She had left the group voluntarily in 2006, and in 2008 made a comeback with her solo music career, which lasted a few years. During her estrangement from music, she studied interior design. In 2016, she and the other original Kudai members reunited.

== Biography ==
=== Early life ===
Nicole Natalino started by doing voices for commercials and her musical debut was at the age of 10. The casting for the group Ciao was held in Chile by their later manager Pablo Vega. Nicole was chosen, along with another girl and two boys (Pablo Holman and Tomás Manzi), by Pablo Vega and together they began their musical career. Ciao sang Italian songs translated to Spanish for children. Due to their success as Ciao and their age, years later they became Kudai; still under Pablo Vega's management. Together they chose the group's new name, Kudai, which they took from the word kudau in Mapudungun, meaning "hard-working young man". In 2004 they met Guz (Gustavo Pinochet) and along with Guz the group wrote their first album as teens and Kudai titled "Vuelo".

=== Kudai (2004–2006) ===
In 2004 they released their first studio album Vuelo. Their first single was "Sin Despertar" which was very successful and popular with teenagers in Latin America. At the beginning of 2005 they released their second single, the ballad "Ya Nada Queda" with great success as well, and later came their third single "Escapar". In August their album Vuelo became platinum. In September 2005, they were nominated for the "Best Central Artist" award and the "Best New Central Artist" award in the MTV Video Music Awards Latin America 2005. In that same month, they released their first DVD of their first tour (2004–2005). With great success in South and Central America their album, Vuelo, was edited in more than six countries and the group passed to form a part of EMI Records. At the beginning of 2006 and with their new album already in the making, they began touring in Chile. Due to the success of their first album they received an invitation to obe of the best events in Latin America, Viña del Mar. Due to their busy schedule they had to decline the invitation to Viña del Mar International Song Festivalthat same year they released the first single of their new album Sobrevive.

"Dejame Gritar" was their first single and soon became the Nº1 requested song in radio stations and the most popular music video on Latin MTV. The success of "Sobrevive" took them all the way to Mexico where they became very popular and began the promotion of their first album "Vuelo". In June of that same year and in the middle of the first International tour, the group suffered their first tragedy. Nicole Natalino decided to leave the tour and headed back to Chile. Many rumours spread but it was later said that Nicole went back due to stress and that she would come back. But on 21 June 2006, the Chilean press and tabloids confirmed that Nicole would no longer be part of the group. At that moment, the three remaining members of Kudai and their manager Pablo Vega decided to replace her with Ecuadorian Gabriela Villalba, ex-member of Kiruba who had been the opening act to the group during a few presentations in Ecuador.

Later the group confirmed that Villalba was staying for good and they re-recorded their latest album "Sobrevive" where they removed Nicole's voice and replaced it with Villalba's. Kudai continued with their tour and their appearances on television to promote their new album, they even performed on the Mexican Disney Channel with a pre-recording of Ya Nada Queda in which even though Gabriela Villalba held the microphone, she informed that it was Nicole's voice heard on the track, since Villalba never re-recorded that song. On October 19, 2006, Kudai won the MTV Video Music Award Latin America for "Best Pop Artist" with their first album "Vuelo". In the acceptance speech, member of Kudai Tomás Cañas gave Nicole credit for her work. Nicole later appeared on Chilean television and confirmed that she saw the award show and although she was given credit in the speech, she was not awarded a tongue.

=== Solo career ===
Nicole work together with the vocalist of Lucybell Claudio Valenzuela on the debut album and ex-producer of Kudai Gustavo Pinochet and his new band SUM. In the song "Nadie" gives voice to the chorus, only she present a demo of the above-mentioned song, after it she made song one with Cristian Cardemil called "Flores Crecerán". Nicole Natalino tried to take a normal life but it could not, felt that the music was calling her to the stages was as well as she decides to return to the music under Gustavo's Pinochet production where her album is preparing debut that will go out to the sale in the first of November 2008, already her first one sounds in the radios single "No Hay Más" released in the radio Hit 40 on 28 July 2008. Some months later Los 40 Principales of Spain are nominated for her first single "No Hay Más", being the first artist in to be nominated with only a success given to knowing about her production.

=== Her return to music and Eternidad (2008–2010) ===
After two years of being away from music and the stage, she began recording what would become her first solo album with the help of Guz in the production and Dr. Alfa in the compositions, whose first single "No Hay Más" was launched on 28 July 2008, on the radio Hit 40, was a success and standing fast in the first national radio stations.

The expectation of the fans from outside was enormous and the single "No Hay Más" then went on the radio in Argentina, Bolivia, Peru, Mexico, Ecuador, Venezuela and Colombia.

She was nominated by that single in the Top 40 Awards Spain, being the first singer to be nominated with just a playing issue. A month later she recorded her video, where she presented her new image. The clip garnered attention in Via X Zona Latina and later on MTV.

Nicole Natalino was baptized as "Nico" because as it is a shorter name and more staff, including family, friends, and tell that.

Then came the second single and I will be announced the release of their album Eternity on 4 December of that year containing ten new songs plus two speakers. Nicole Natalino signed discs from their fans present that day and sang live their first two singles "No More" and "I will" plus a medley of Kudai.

Later release her second music video "I will" also announcing its first solo concert for the 18 January 2009 filled that day passed all the subjects of her album and signed autographs after the show to their fans.

Later presentations are scheduled the first of Eternidad abroad in Peru, Ecuador and Colombia in June and July 2009 Nico noticed that leaving out Kudai is less important than in Chile "Really, when I talk to journalists in Peru or Colombia, or the fans, or radios, they all seem very natural that it is now singing alone and trying to make a name for myself", said.

On 16 August she participated in the concerts in Chile at the Teatro Caupolicán meeting for the first time to 13 local female performers that stand between Nicole, Denisse Malebrán, Javiera Parra, Francisca Valenzuela among others, being the youngest of the group which represented the younger generation as well as a touch pop.

Besides music Nico joined the campaign to prevent teen pregnancy by saying "the decision has to be initiated sexually mature and after a deep personal process". She was nominated for the first time solo for Best New Artist Center in Los MTV 10 on 15 October was the awards ceremony in Bogota.

On 22 November participates in the National Music Day along with other artists in the Parque O'Higgins.

Was chosen to perform "Forever Young" by Violeta Parra between 10 emblematic songs of all time in Chile for the competence of the Festival de Viña 2010 Bicentennial Chile. of which only one was a festival competition.

But do not stay within the 5 most voted songs Camino a Viña program delivered on 28 November on Channel 13 in conjunction with National Television of Chile Twitter Nico confessed her confusion by the negative results but the next day at the same half said "Sometimes you win sometimes you lose but family and friends will always be there! Thank you very much for all your everlasting love and support".

In January 2010 she participated in a tour called Tour Glass Show and traveled throughout the southern and central Chile in the Truck Glass: The route of the Chilean music with the band electro-pop of The Plugin, band led by former La Ley, Rodrigo "Coti" Aboitiz, Nabu and the revelation of the electro-rock, 2009 Mawashi. The truck pulls up and down the walls to reveal a stage with amps, instruments and band in vivo.

She composed the theme for the movie Bicentennial "Esmeralda" which she played live with Denisse Guerrero Mario Malebran and aboard a replica of the Corvette Esmeralda.

Nicole Natalino recorded a track for the foundation of cienmanos soon be revealed this song. Nico was preparing for her second album with the designer Gustavo Pinochet Kudai Music. Nico has recorded the video "a secret between the two" Nicolás Majorca, this was released later in 2010.

=== Kudai comeback (2016–present) ===
In early 2016, Natalino, along with Sepúlveda and Manzi, accepted Holman's proposal to form Kudai again, with the original line-up, thus discarding Villalba (Natalino's substitute during the Kudai first run). On 30 November of that year, on the occasion of the "Kudai International Day", Natalino and her bandmates officially announce the return to the stages.

On 26 February 2017, the new single ("Aqui Estaré") with its music video is published. It marks the first Natalino's appearance in a music video in more than 7 years and the first with her Kudai bandmates since Déjame Gritar in 2006.

In the concerts that Kudai performed in Chile, Peru, Bolivia and Mexico during 2017, Natalino also sang "Seré", from her solo career (Holman accompanying her in the chorus).

== Discography ==
- 2008 Eternidad

=== Ciao ===
- 1999 El poder de los niños

=== Kudai ===
- 2004 Volar
- 2006 Sobrevive
- 2010 Greatest Hits
- 2019 Laberinto
- 2021 Revuelo

== Contributors ==
- Ser on SUM (2007)
- flowers will grow on Cristian Cardemil (2008)
- A secret between the two by Nicolas Majorca (2009)
