= Doctor Krápula =

Colombian ska punk band

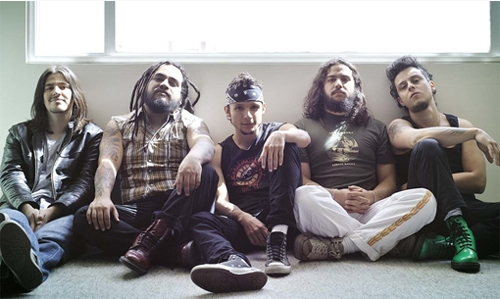

Background information
- Origin: Bogotá, Colombia
- Genres: Ska punk
- Years active: 1998–present
- Members: Mario Muñoz “The Subcantante” David Jaramillo “David Kawooq” Germán Martínez “Kasius” Sergio Acosta “Checho” Nicolás Cabrera “Niko”
- Past members: Dib Hadra Arciniégas; Freddy Caldas
- Website: doctorkrapula.net

Doctor Krápula is a Colombian ska punk band, made up of Mario Muñoz, David Jaramillo, Nicolás Cabrera, Sergio Acosta and Germán Martínez. Although the band is recognized more as a rock and punk band, it also incorporates folk rhythmic genres in its songs; such as ska, reggae, punk and rocksteady.

Through most of Colombia, its origin country, it is mainly recognized for having strong political messages in its lyrics (as can be heard in their song about the Mexican students that were disappeared), and for its left-leaning political activism (Exigimos, Bam, etc.).

== History ==
The band was formed in 1998 by seven musicians in Bogotá, Colombia, and in their 25-year career, they have released eight albums, including: “El Carnaval de la Patilla”, “Turn the Disco around”, “Bombea”, “Sagrado Corazón”, “Corazón Bombea Vivo”, “Viva el Planeta”, “Ama-Zonas” and "Calle Caliente". "Ama-zonas" was produced in collaboration with Jaguar Collective (Colectivo Jaguar).

They have won seventeen Shock Music Awards and four Our Earth Awards. They have also been nominated to five Latin Grammy, three Latin MTV Awards and one 40 Principales Awards in Spain. Dr. Krápula was the group creator of the Viva El Planeta Festival in Bogotá in May 2012, and has been in charge of their eight editions so far.

They have a Gold Record in sales in Colombia for their Album « Viva El Planeta », delivered on 25 May 2013, by Star Entertainment Group, within the framework of Event 40, carried out by Los 40 Principales Colombia in the Simón Bolívar Park of the city of Bogota

The music of Doctor Krápula mixes the sounds of ska with reggae, rock, punk and rocksteady, adding tropical rhythms such as merengue and even salsa. On 31 May 2016, they were awarded the Simón Bolívar Order of Democracy for their environmental activism on the recovery of the ancestral territory of the Sierra Nevada, Amazonas and Cauca.

== Members ==
Current Members

- Mario Muñoz “El Sucantante”: lead vocalist.
- David Jaramillo “David Kawooq”: bass and vocals.
- Germán Martínez “Kasius”: lead guitar and backing vocals.
- Sergio Acosta “Checho”: hammond, keyboards, accordion and backing vocals.
- Nicolás Cabrera “Niko”: drums and backing vocals.

Touring Members

- Iván Carranza: Bass

Past Members

- Dib Hadra Arciniégas: guitar.
- Freddy Caldas: percussion

== Discography ==
- 2002: The Carnival of the Apatilla.
- 2003: Give the Wuelta to the Disco.
- 2005: Bombea.
- 2008: Sacred Heart.
- 2011: Heart Pumps Live (CD / DVD Live).
- 2012: Viva El Planeta.
- 2014: Ama-zonas (Doctor Krápula + Collective Jaguar).
- 2017: ANIMAL.
- 2018: Viva Doctor Krápula.
- 2020: El Monstruo Arrepentido.

== Videos ==
- 2000: Canción demora - El carnaval de la apatilla.
- 2002: El hombre gris - El carnaval de la apatilla.
- 2003: 1143 Tomates contigo - Dele la welta al disco.
- 2005: La fuerza del amor - Bombea.
- 2005: Para todos todo - Bombea.
- 2006: El pibe de mi barrio - Bombea.
- 2008: Activación - Sagrado corazón.
- 2008: Bam - Sagrado corazón.
- 2008: Mas vale tarde que nunca - Sagrado corazón.
- 2008: Mi gente - Sagrado corazón.
- 2008: Mister danger - Sagrado corazón.
- 2010: Gol de mi corazón - Corazón bombea vivo.
- 2010: Mi sol - Corazón bombea vivo.
- 2010: Somos - Corazón bombea vivo.
- 2012: Amanece - Viva el planeta.
- 2012: Exigimos - Viva el planeta.
- 2012: Doctor Krápula presente - Viva el planeta.
- 2013: Antídoto - Viva el planeta.
- 2013: Buscando el amor - Viva el planeta.
- 2013: Viva el planeta - Viva el planeta (Colectivo VÍDEO EN LAS NUBES).
- 2013: Solo soy - Viva el Planeta (with the participation of Emiliano Brancciari de No Te Va Gustar).
- 2014: Ama-Zonas - Ama-zonas.
- 2015: Entregarlo todo (Vídeolyric, single making homage to the Colombian soccer selection- Selección de fútbol de Colombia).
- 2016: Más que bien - (single).
- 2016: Desaparecidos - (Vídeolyric, single).
- 2017: Democracy - (Vídeolyric, single).
- 2017: Animal - (Vídeolyric, Animal).
- 2018: Bogogo - (Vertical Vídeolyric, single).

== Awards ==
- seventeen Shock Awards.
- four Nuestra Tierra Awards.
- three nominations for the MTV Latinoamérica Awards.
- one nomination for the 40 Principales Awards in Spain.
- five nominations for the Premios Grammy Latinos Awards.
- one Gold Disc in the year 2013.
- one Orden de la Democracia Simón Bolívar.
