= Ádammo =

- Origin: Lima, Peru
- Genres: Rock, power pop
- Years active: 2007–2013
- Members: Ezio Oliva; Renzo Bravo; Diego Ubierna
- Past members: Alexandre Remoue; Nicholas Cáceres
- Website: www.adammo.net

Ádammo (also spelled Adammo) was a Peruvian rock band whose style, described as Power pop that combines hard rock with a touch of melodic rock Adamm achieved consolidated as the pioneer of power pop band in Latin America. The band name comes from a Greek dialect which means "Pleasure to do something", in this case pleasure of making music.

== History ==
The band debuted in 2007, having won a competition called Garage Bands organized by Studio 92, a competition in which more than 200 Peruvian bands participated.

In July 2008 the band took part in the concert of the Mexican group Camila, playing live to ten thousand people in the Jockey Club del Perú. The reception of the public was positive, so much so that at the end of the concert they were crowded by concert personnel who fought to take a photo with them and get an autograph. At the end of the year the band produced the video Sin Miedo, which was well received at MTV.

The band officially released its first record, Sin Miedo, on April 25, 2009 at Discothèque Vocé of District of Lince. It was produced by Francisco Murias, a recognized Peruvian music producer who was nominated for the Latin Grammy Awards and has worked with artists like Johana Carreño and Fatking Bulla.

In February 2009, the band took part in the Festival of pop music in Lima, where they appeared alongside bands such as Belanova and the already recognized Backstreet Boys. This event took place in Monumental Stadio de Lima.

In 2009, Alex Remou left the band to study in the United States. In August the band appeared in the "Arequipeña Beer Festival".

On October 15, 2009 the band won its first international prize in 2009 Latin American MTV Awards, in the Best New Artist category. In MTV's annual ranking Los 100 + pepidos del 2009 the band got first place with "In your dreams".

In January 2010, the band agreed to open for Beyoncé in her February 16 concert in Lima.

In February the band headed the "Powerpop Fest" on February 25 in the Ravine Bar District of Barranco in Lima. In May, the band announced that it was recording its new production in the famous studio Choice Recording.

In July, 2010, Ádammo expressed its desire to travel and live in Mexico with the intention of conquering the international market. "We are ready to conquer this market", they said, adding that, "Now we want to jump into the pool of internationalization, and it does not matter if for the present this pool is tiny or is full, we feel that we are ready and prepared to conquer musical markets such as those of Mexico and Los Angeles". Band member Diego Ubierna thanked his fans for their support and added: "We are surprised by the number of fans that we have in other countries such as Colombia and Ecuador and it motivates us to continuing working so that the Peruvian rock is heard around the world".

In August the band was nominated for a Proudly Latin Award as Latin Group of the Year. In September 2010, the band took part in the soundtrack of the first MTV Latin America series called Niñas mal. In the same month they were nominated for a Latin Grammy Award in the category of best musical short video for "Algún Día". Later in Los 100 + pedidos of 2010 the band was in fourth place with the video of "Algún Día".

In January 2011, the Peruvian daily The Republic highlighted Ádammo as the most recommended in Twitter in 2010. The publication said: "The portal Followfriday.com that publishes a weekly list of Twitter users most recommended by other users, published the annual ranking of the 50 most-recommended Peruvian twitterers during 2010. Heading the list were three of the members of Ádammo: Diego Ubierna, Ezio Oliva and Renzo Bravo in the positions 1, 2 and 3 respectively".

In 2011 the band had as a guest the Disney actress and singer, Andrea Guasch, with whom they worked on TV and live internet.

In February they organized "Amber Fest" where their guests were Vali Cacere, Locomotor, Enero, and Andrea Guasch. The band participated in Lima Music Fest, joining Camila and Noel Schajris. In early May, the band took part in the soundtrack of the original "Nickelodeon" series Grachi, composing the song "Hechizo de Amor", and also taking part in some episodes of the series. In June they launched the pop video of "Siento que Caigo" and the version in English together with "Andrea Guasch".

The band launched on May 26, 2012 a new album titled "Tiempos Violentos" on Amazon Music Store. The album includes the collaborations of Colombian duo Cali & El Dandee and American singer Colette Carr.

== Discography ==
=== Studio albums ===
- Sin Miedo (2009)
- Ámber (2011)
- Tiempos Violentos (2012)

=== Videos ===
Year	Song	Album
2009	Sin miedo	Sin Miedo
2009	En tus sueños	Sin Miedo
2010	Algún día	Ámber
2011	Siento que Caigo	Ámber
2012	Venus	Tiempos Violentos

== Awards and nominations ==
Year	Nominated work	Prize	Category	Country	Result
2009	Ádammo	MTV Latin America	Revelation Artist	Colombia	Nominee
2009	Ádammo	MTV Latin America	Best New Artist: Center	Colombia	Winner
2009	Ádammo	MTV Latin America	Prize Zone	Colombia	Nominee
2010	Ádammo	Premios APDAYC	Rock Group of the Year	Peru	Winner
2010	Ádammo	Premios APDAYC	Artist of the Year	Peru	Nominee
2010	Ádammo	Premios Orgullosamente Latino	Grupo Latin of the year	Mexico	Nominee
2010	Algún Día	Latin Grammy Awards	Short Video of the Year	United States	Nominee
2010	Ádammo	Premios Clarín	Best Music Video of the Year	Argentina	Nominee
2010	Ádammo	Premios Clarín	Best International Breakthrough	Argentina	Nominee
2010	Ádammo	Premios Clarín	Best International Album	Argentina	Nominee
2010	Algún Día	Radio Can	Best Video	Colombia	Nomiee
2011	Ádammo	Premios APDAYC	Rock Group of the Year	Peru	Winner
2011	Ádammo	MTV Europe Music Awards	World Wide Act Latin American	Europe	Nominee
2011	Ádammo	Zona Joven	Best Pop Rock Peruano	Peru	Winner
2012	Siento que Caigo	Radio Can	Song of the Year	Peru	Nominee
2012	Siento que Caigo	Premio Luces	Song of the Year	Peru	Nominee

== Achievements ==
The 100 + orders in 2009

- Sin miedo (Since 27)
- En tus sueños (Since 1)

Los 100 + orders in 2010

- Algun dia (Since 4)
