= List of events held at Simón Bolívar Park =

This is the list of events held and announced to be held in the Simón Bolívar Park, including events at the Sports' Palace (Palacio de los Deportes) complex.

== Concerts ==
Concerts held in Events Plaza:

Artist	Date
Def Leppard	April 12, 1997
Metallica, La Pestilencia & Darkness	May 2, 1999
Ángeles del Infierno, La Pestilencia, A.N.I.M.A.L. & Ultrágeno	April 9, 2000
Megadeth & Ethereal	June 10, 2000
Sepultura & La Pestilencia	August 26, 2000
Los Fabulosos Cadillacs	June 21, 2001
Slipknot & Koyi k utho	September 18, 2005
Shakira	November 17, 2006
Wisin & Yandel	March 2, 2007
Roger Waters	March 9, 2007
Gwen Stefani & The Hall Effect	July 27, 2007
Soda Stereo & De Lux Club	November 24, 2007
Daddy Yankee	December 7, 2007 2007
Iron Maiden, Lauren Harris & Introspección	February 28, 2008
Wisin & Yandel	April 25, 2008
Maná	May 25; June 21, 2008
Aterciopelados	July 28, 2008
Andrés Calamaro	October 21, 2008
The Hall Effect	November 9, 2008
Iron Maiden, Lauren Harris, Anthrax, Loathsome Faith & Abstract Enemy	March 7, 2009
KISS	April 11, 2009
Depeche Mode & Angele Phase	October 10, 2009
Coldplay, Bat for Lashes & Estados Alterados	March 4, 2010
Metallica, Mastodon & Deeptrip En La Casa	March 10, 2010
Aerosmith	May 10, 2010
Don Tetto	August 15, 2010
Scorpions, Cinderella, Akash & Supremacy	September 9, 2010
Don Tetto	September 21, 2010
Demi Lovato & Jonas Brothers	October 28, 2010
Shakira, Train, Belanova, Bomba Estéreo y J Balvin	March 12, 2012
Iron Maiden & Potestad	March 20, 2011
Don Tetto	April 1, 2011
Ozzy Osbourne, Brand New Blood & Sigma	April 16, 2011
Marc Anthony & Sin Animo De Lucro	July 16, 2011
Red Hot Chili Peppers, Foals & Son Batá	September 11, 2011
Aerosmith, The Black Cat Bone & The Hall Effect	November 3, 2011
Britney Spears	November 26, 2011
Calle 13	December 7, 2011
Café Tacuba	December 11, 2012
The Cure & Superlitio	April 19, 2013
Vicentico	May 25, 2013
Black Sabbath, Megadeth & Stoneflex	October 19, 2013
Metallica & Nepentes	November 24, 2007
Willie Colón & El Gran Combo de Puerto Rico	August 1, 2014
Ghostface Killah	October 11, 2014
Cultura Profética	April 9, 2015
Imagine Dragons & The Mills	April 21, 2015
La Derecha, Efecto Pasillo y Julieta Venegas	May 9, 2015
Jesús Adrián Romero	October 15, 2015
Pearl Jam, Spoon & The Hall Effect	November 25, 2015
Aerosmith, Stayway	September 29, 2016 Rock n Roll Rumble Tour
Ed Sheeran, Antonio Lulic & Sebastian Yatra	June 2, 2017
Green Day, The Interrupters & The Kistch	November 17, 2017; Revolution Radio Tour
Depeche Mode & Estados Alterados	March 16, 2018
Radiohead, Flying Lotus, Junun & Ghetto Kumbé	April 25, 2018; Soundhearts Festival

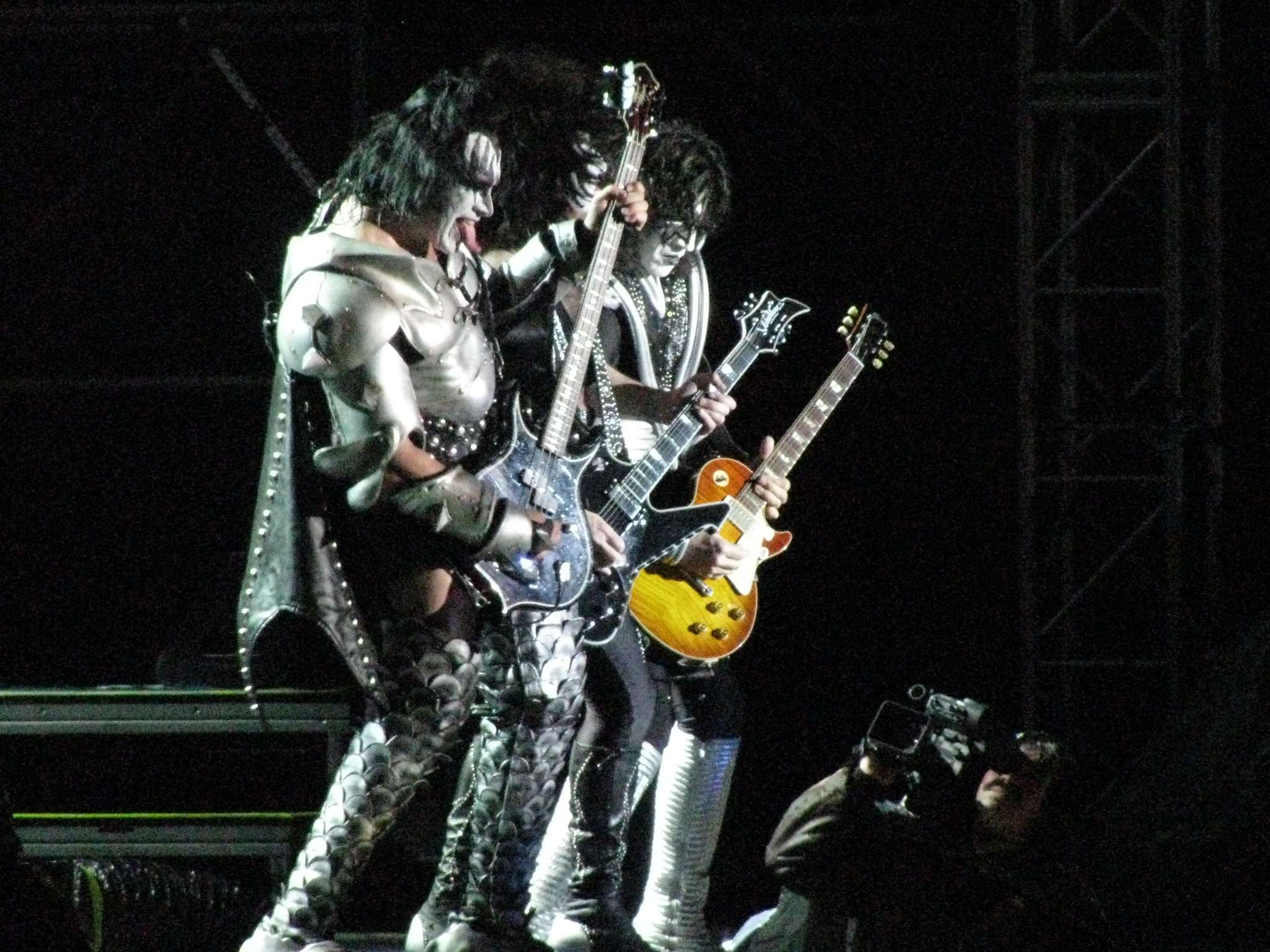
Kiss performing in the Events Plaza.

Concerts held in the Palacio De Los Deportes Arena:

Artist	Date
Los Fabulosos Cadillacs	August 20, 1994
Soda Stereo & Danny Dodge	October 18, 1995
Tears for Fears	July 14, 1996
Soda Stereo	November 30, 1996
Laura Pausini	June 6, 1997
Gustavo Cerati	May 28, 2000
Therion	July 10, 2001
Helloween	June 25, 2001
Dimmu Borgir, Ethereal & Anima	August 20, 2001
Yngwie Malmsteen & Tom Ambella	September 29; 2001
Children of Bodom	November 19, 2001
Kreator, Destruction & Neurosis	September 7, 2002
Rosario Flores	November 6, 2002
Mayhem & Sinister	March 24, 2003
Therion	August 23; 2004
Enrique Bunbury	August 28, 2004
Alan Parsons Project	February 5, 2005
Barón Rojo & Quiet riot	March 20, 2005
The White Stripes & Sexy Lucy	May 21, 2005
Tiziano Ferro	June 30, 2005
Good Charlotte & Tres de Corazón	September 22, 2005
Incubus	November 29, 2005
Dream Theater	February 26, 2006
Manu Chao	March 8 & 9, 2006
The Rasmus	April 4, 2006
Slayer & Masacre	September 15, 2006
Kraken	December 6, 2006
Aterciopelados, Don Tetto, The Black Cat Bone, Zona Cero & El Sie7e	December 20, 2006
Deftones, Injury & Raíz	February 6, 2007
Placebo & Pornomotora	March 22, 2007
Blind Guardian	March 31, 2007
Symphony X & Sigma	June 19, 2007
Totó la Momposina	August 9, 2007
Björk y La Fábrica	November 17, 2007
Testament	May 25, 2008
Muse & The Hall Effect	July 20, 2008
Joe Satriani	August 8, 2008
Joan Manuel Serrat	November 12, 2008
Mägo de Oz	October 15, 2009
Café Tacuba	July 3, 2009
Ángeles del Infierno, Soziedad Alkoholika, Masacre & 1280 Almas	October 9, 2009
José Luis Perales	November 4, 2009
Ska-P	November 13, 2009
P.O.D.	April 17, 2010
Slash & Alfonso Espriella	April 2, 2011
Thirty Seconds to Mars & Nicer Dicers	April 4 & 6, 2011
Slayer & Hybrid Minds	June 14, 2011
Immortal, Luciferian, Dark Wisdom & Soulburner	October 11, 2011
Don Tetto	November 12, 2011
Mägo de Oz & Mayan	November 13, 2011
Megadeth & Anger Rise	November 23, 2011
Enrique Bunbury	March 16, 2012
Il Volo	April 15, 2012
Dream Theater & Tom Ambella	August 15, 2012
Il Divo	October 16, 2012
Doctor krápula, Puerto Candelaria, Nawal, Nepentes, Puerquerama, Eljury & Juan Galeano	May 18, 2012
Fito Páez	May 4, 2013
Big Time Rush	February 22, 2014
Bajofondo	March 13, 2014
Teen Top	August 17, 2014
Zoé & Superlitio	September 18, 2014
Joaquín Sabina	May 30, 2015
Andrés Calamaro	November 23, 2016
Queens of the Stone Age & Los Makenzy	March 10, 2018

== Festivals ==
Date	Event	Notes
2000–2011 (ANNUALLY)	Rock al Parque	Attendance (2011): 336,000 people
May 21, 2011	Evento Los 40 Principales	Attendance: 70,000 people. Featuring Dulce Maria, Paty Cantú, Cabas, Lucas Arnau among others.
