= Teatro Royal Center =

Theater in Bogotá, Colombia

- Interactive map of Teatro Royal Center
- Location: Cra 13 # 66-80 Bogotá, Colombia
- Coordinates: 4°39′11″N 74°03′46″W
- Capacity: 4,500

Construction
- Opened: 2010

The Royal Theatre Center is located in the Chapinero neighborhood in the city of Bogotá. It is a modern theater that can hold music, theater and television events.

The maximum capacity of the theatre is 4,500 people, it is the largest theater located in Bogotá. Its facilities include restrooms, special boxes, meeting room, seats, food court, telephones and emergency exits.

== Events ==
Today this complex is used for organizing concerts due to its versatility. The artists that have performed in this place include:

Artist	Date
LCD Soundsystem	February 25, 2011
Stratovarius y Helloween	April 26, 2011
Pitbull, J Balvin & Jiggy Drama	August 12, 2011
Jorge González	September 2, 2011
Blind Guardian	September 16, 2011
Foster the People	March 27, 2012
Ángeles del Infierno & Tierra Santa	March 31, 2012
Thievery Corporation	April 3, 2012
Friendly Fires	April 4, 2012
Anthrax, Exodus, Obituary & Aggressive	April 30, 2012
WarCry	May 21, 2012
Therion	June 7, 2012
Porta, Kavelo & No Drama, Big Mancilla	June 26, 2012
The Smashing Pumpkins	June 29, 2012
Megadeth & Patricio Stiglich Project	September 2, 2012
Bomba Estéreo	October 31, 2012
Gogol Bordello	November 5, 2012
Cavalera Conspiracy & Stained Glory	November 12, 2012
Mala Rodríguez & Bomba Estéreo	September 7, 2013
WarCry	October 7, 2013
Jane's Addiction & Árbol de Ojos	October 17, 2013
The xx	October 18; 20, 2013
Steve Vai	December 3, 2013
Café Tacuba & Bomba Estéreo	December 13, 2013
Illya Kuryaki and the Valderramas & Systema Solar	March 14, 2014
Iced Earth	March 25, 2014
The Drums	April 10, 2014
Information Society	May 2, 2014
Megadeth & The South	May 6, 2014
Amon Amarth	May 24, 2014
Therion	May 26, 2014
Jose Andrea, Gillman, Saurom, Sagar, Legend Maker, Power Insane & Mindwall	May 31, 2014
Quiet Riot, Faster Pussycat, Broken Zip, Sagar, Anger Rise & The Price	August 9, 2014
Joss Stone	August 27, 2014
Joe Satriani	September 23, 2014
Franz Ferdinand	October 5, 2014
Queens of the Stone Age & Alain Johannes	October 7, 2014
Mala Rodríguez, Hercules and Love Affair & LosPetitFellas	October 31, 2014
La Oreja de Van Gogh	November 7, 2014
Fito Páez	November 13, 2014
Icona Pop	November 19, 2014
Tame Impala, Esteman & The Lumineers	November 20, 2014
Capital Cities	December 7, 2014
James Blunt	March 20, 2015
Interpol & Él Mató a un Policía Motorizado	March 25, 2015
Machine Head	May 31, 2015
Mägo de Oz	June 5, 2015
Kraken, Albatroz & Mankind	Jun 20, 2015
Koyi k utho, El Sagrado, Surviving in a World, Nonsense Premonition, Black Note, Kontragolpe, Black Memory, Info, New World Order, Prave, Unauthorized & Dj Reichi	July 19; 20, 2015
Tokio Hotel	August 20, 2015
Faith No More & Desnudos en Coma	September 18, 2015
Foals & Movement	October 2, 2015
Nightwish y Delain	October 10, 2015
J Balvin, Farruko & Jiggy Drama	November 26, 2015
R5	November 29, 2015
Aterciopelados, Esteman, Manuel Medrano, Macaco, Pedrina Y Río, Bomba Estéreo, Monsieur Periné & LosPetitFellas	December 8, 2015
Epica	February 14, 2016
PXNDX	February 19, 2016
Manu Chao & Alerta Kamarada	March 19, 2016
Soulfly & Kilcrops	March 27, 2016
Cultura Profética	April 1, 2016
Pablo Alborán	June 14, 2016
Iggy Pop	October 6, 2016
Totó la Momposina & Herencia de Timbiquí	October 14, 2016
La Pestilencia, No Te Va Gustar, Telebit, Diamante Eléctrico, Don Tetto, The Mills, Cocoa Sirens & Stayway	December 11, 2016
Diplo, Mad Professor, Dj Mike Style & Rat Race	February 24, 2017
Ángeles del Infierno & Mateo Acevedo Band	April 7, 2017
Fonseca, Sebastián Yatra, Jesse & Joy, Martina la Peligrosa, Vicente García & Irie Kingzs	December 8, 2017
Rawayana, Vicente García & El Freaky	March 9, 2018
Mon Laferte, Juan Pablo Vega & David Aguilar	April 9, 2018
Ha*Ash	June 14, 2018
Los Amigos Invisibles	June 21, 2018
Ventino	September 9, 2018
KARD	September 11, 2018
Vance Joy	October 16, 2018
Claptone	November 1, 2018
Dimmu Borgir	November 15, 2018
Cavalera Conspiracy & Witchtrap	November 18, 2018
Yuri	November 24, 2018
Boyce Avenue	November 30, 2018
Primus	January 22, 2019
Robin Schulz	March 1, 2019
Snow Patrol	March 25, 2019
Jungle	May 11, 2019
La 33	May 17, 2019
Rata Blanca	May 18, 2019
Armando Manzanero & Mocedades	May 29, 2019
The Neighbourhood	June 7, 2019
Los Caligaris	June 21, 2019
Kany García	August 6, 2019
Los Auténticos Decadentes Unplugged	August 16; 17, 2019
HammerFall	August 29, 2019
Dread Mar I	September 14, 2019
LP	October 6, 2019
Kevin Roldán	October 25; 26, 2019
The Offspring, Bad Religion % Chite	October 31, 2019
Epica	November 2, 2019
Nach	November 9, 2019
WarCry	November 10, 2019
Keane	November 20, 2019
Beret	March 5, 2020
Peter Manjarrés	March 14, 2020
Kali Uchis	March 31, 2020
Young the Giant	May 19, 2020
Mägo de Oz	June 6, 2020
Lauren Daigle	June 11, 2020
Amon Amarth & Powerwolf	December 31, 2020
Black Pumas	March 24, 2022
Molchat Doma	April 6, 2022
Opeth	April 28, 2022
Boris Brejcha & Ann Clue	May 5, 2022
Emperor	May 15, 2022
Erasure	July 19, 2022
Tristania	December 5, 2022
Turilli / Lione Rhapsody	January 29, 2023
Lauren Jauregui	March 8, 2023
Melendi	March 16, 2023
Tove Lo	March 22, 2023
Los Calzones Rotos	March 24, 2023
WarCry	March 25, 2023
Accept, Stratovarius, Grave Digger	April 19, 2023
Kudai	May 27, 2023
Luis7Lunes, Vic Deal, Maco Matt, La Etnnia, Penyair, Tres Coronas, & Granuja	June 3, 2023
El Kanka	June 24, 2023
Juliana Velásquez	August 12, 2023
Mitú	August 25, 2023
The Warning	October 7, 2023
Lasso	October 13, 2023
Boy Harsher	November 5, 2023
The Lumineers	November 13, 2023
Esteman	November 17, 2023
Saurom	November 24, 2023
K. K. Downing	December 5, 2023
Elsa y Elmar	December 8, 2023
Epica	February 4, 2024
Rupatrupa	February 9, 2024
Men at Work	February 23, 2024
Greta Van Fleet	March 20; 21, 2024
Royal Blood	April 5, 2024
Turnstile	April 7, 2024
Emperor, Necrophobic	April 16, 2024
Voz Veis	April 18, 2024
Kybba	April 27, 2024
Accept	May 9, 2024
Damas Gratis	May 10, 2024
Bicep	May 11, 2024
Ashnikko	May 17, 2024
Mägo de Oz	May 18, 2024
Black Pumas	May 20, 2024
Elder Dayán Díaz	May 25, 2024
Rawayana	July 5, 2024
Monsieur Periné	August 24, 2024
Amon Amarth	October 22, 2024
Wos	October 25, 2024
Mother Mother	October 30, 2024
Zhu	November 2, 2024
Kudai	November 9, 2024
Siddhartha	December 7, 2024
Pierce the Veil	December 5, 2025
Don Tetto	December 21, 2024
YSY A	March 1, 2025
Garbage	March 12, 2025
The Warning	March 20, 2024
Parcels	March 26, 2025
KALEO	April 26, 2025
W.A.S.P.	April 27, 2025
Sabaton	May 9, 2025
Rata Blanca	August 7, 2025
ALI A.K.A MIND	August 16, 2025
YSY A	September 27, 2025
Bandalos Chinos	October 18, 2025
PICUS	October 24, 2019
L'Impératrice	October 29, 2025
Molchat Doma	November 7, 2025
Damiano David	November 13, 2025
Avantasia	November 23, 2025
Pierce the Veil	December 5, 2025
Jason Mraz	March 14, 2026
MARINA	March 19, 2026
Halestorm	April 11, 2026
In Flames	April 28, 2026
Portugal. The Man	May 7, 2026
Álex Ubago	August 13, 2026
Tan Biónica	September 8, 2026
Old Man's Child, Hecate Enthroned	September 20, 2026
Akriila	October 30, 2026
Maisak	November 6, 2026
Opeth	November 8, 2026
Orquesta La 33	November 21, 2026
Of Monsters and Men	November 30, 2026
Dimmu Borgir	December 8, 2026
Slaughter to Prevail	December 15, 2026
Sleeping with Sirens	December 16, 2026
De La Rose	December 19, 2026
Freya Skye	January 21, 2027
Motionless in White	February 28, 2027
Jet	April 10, 2027
HammerFall	May 2, 2027
Nsqk	August 28, 2027

== See also ==
- Teatro Metropol de Bogotá
- Downtown Majestic
