= Libido (disambiguation) =

Libido usually refers to sexual drive.

Libido may also refer to:

== Music ==
- Libido (band), a Peruvian rock group
  - Libido (Libido album), 1998
- Libido (Brigitte Fontaine album), 2006
- Libido (Buck-O-Nine album), 1999
- Livid (Nightmare album), 2004, sometimes incorrectly called Libido
- "libidO", 2021 song by the South Korean K-Pop group OnlyOneOf

== Film ==
- Libido (1965 film), a 1965 Italian thriller directed by Ernesto Gastaldi
- Libido (性の起原), a 1967 film directed by Kaneto Shindō
- Libido (1973 film), a 1973 Australian drama film
- Libido (2013 film), a 2013 Egyptian short documentary film

== Other uses ==
- Libido language, a Cushitic language
- Libido (journal), an academic publication that won the 1999 Sexual Freedom Award for Publications
