= Downtown Majestic =

Theatre and music venue in Bogotá, Colombia

- Teatro Mogador, Auditorio Mayor Cun
- Location: 46, Cra. 7 #27; Bogotá, Colombia
- Owner: Downtown
- Capacity: 2,200
- Field size: 2,100 m^{2} (23,000 sq ft)

Construction
- Opened: 1983
- Renovated: 2007

Website
- www.elcentrodeconvenciones.com

The Downtown Majestic (formerly known as "Downtown") is a center for cultural, musical or educational events and meetings in Bogotá, Colombia.

It is a historical heritage, built in 1938, originally called Teatro Mogador, and since 2007 began to be called Downtown Majestic, and has been specifically adapted to host events. Others have lockers for events, telephones, dressing rooms, food bars, bathrooms, private boxes and dependent income. During the year 2016 was remodeled and by 2017 began to call Auditorium Mayor Cun.

== Concerts ==
Today this complex is used for organizing concerts due to the versatility of the place. Among the artists presented in this exhibition they are :

Artist	Date
Hatebreed, Agnostic Front, Raíz, Zona Cero & Ataque En Contra	July 31, 2005
Napalm Death & Masacre	Noviembre 2, 2005
Todos Tus Muertos	September 23, 2006
Dark Funeral, Torture Squad, Mysticism, Soulburner & Luciferian	October 5, 2006
Voodoo Glow Skulls	November 12, 2006
Dolores O'Riordan	August 30, 2007
Exodus, Overkill, Perpetual Witness y Victimized	October 30, 2007
Cultura Profética	November 10, 2007
Toto	November 16, 2007
The Black Dahlia Murder, Hellbitches, Holy Shit & Cuentos de los Hermanos Grind	April 6; 2008
Obituary & Vitam Et Mortem	April 26, 2008
Cultura Profética	April 30, 2008
Calle 13	May 9, 2008
Miranda!	July 19, 2008
Tarja Turunen	August 20, 2008
Sodom, Ursus & Cobra	September 6, 2008
Epica	September 13, 2008
Ratt	October 30, 2008
Morbid Angel	March 1, 2009
Emir Kusturica & The No Smoking Orchestra	March 27, 2009
DragonForce & Thunderblast	May 19, 2009
Kreator, Exodus, Witchtrap & Sagros	October 11, 2009
Enrique Bunbury	October 15; 16, 2009
El Gran Combo de Puerto Rico	March 27, 2010
Gamma Ray	April 30, 2010
Lacuna Coil, Inri & Voltsender	June 12, 2010
Angra	June 27, 2010
Switchfoot	September 11, 2010
Lacrimosa	October 7, 2010
Therion	October 9, 2010
Belle and Sebastian	Novembre 19, 2010
Disturbed & Stayway	Agost 21, 2011
Bullet for My Valentine & The Ikarus Falling	November 26, 2011
Fito Páez	December 7; 8, 2011
Epica	September 22, 2012
Enanitos Verdes y Jorge González	September 28, 2012
Rata Blanca	October 18, 2012
Simple Plan	October 26, 2012
Mägo de Oz	March 2, 2013
Stratovarius & Albatroz	May 26, 2013
Helloween y Gamma Ray	November 28, 2013
Los Toreros Muertos y Los de Adentro	May 30, 2014
El Gran Combo de Puerto Rico, Richie Ray & Bobby Cruz	October 4, 2014
Within Temptation	November 23, 2014
Sick of It All	March 8, 2015
Aterciopelados, Superlitio & Salsa N´ Groove	May 6, 2017
Cuarteto de nos & Telebit	September 17. 2017
In Flames, Kontragolpe & Athica	October 15; 2017
Zakk Sabbath & The Black Cat Bonw	November 21; 2017
La-33 & Mauro Castillo	March 10; 2018
Rata Blanca, Kraken & Mankind	April 6; 2018
Cannibal Corpse, Napalm Death & Threshold End	September 29; 2018

== See also ==
- Teatro Metropol de Bogotá
- Teatro Royal Center
