= Teatro Metropol =

Theatre and former cinema in Bogotá, Colombia

Coordinates: 4°36′33″N 74°4′9″W

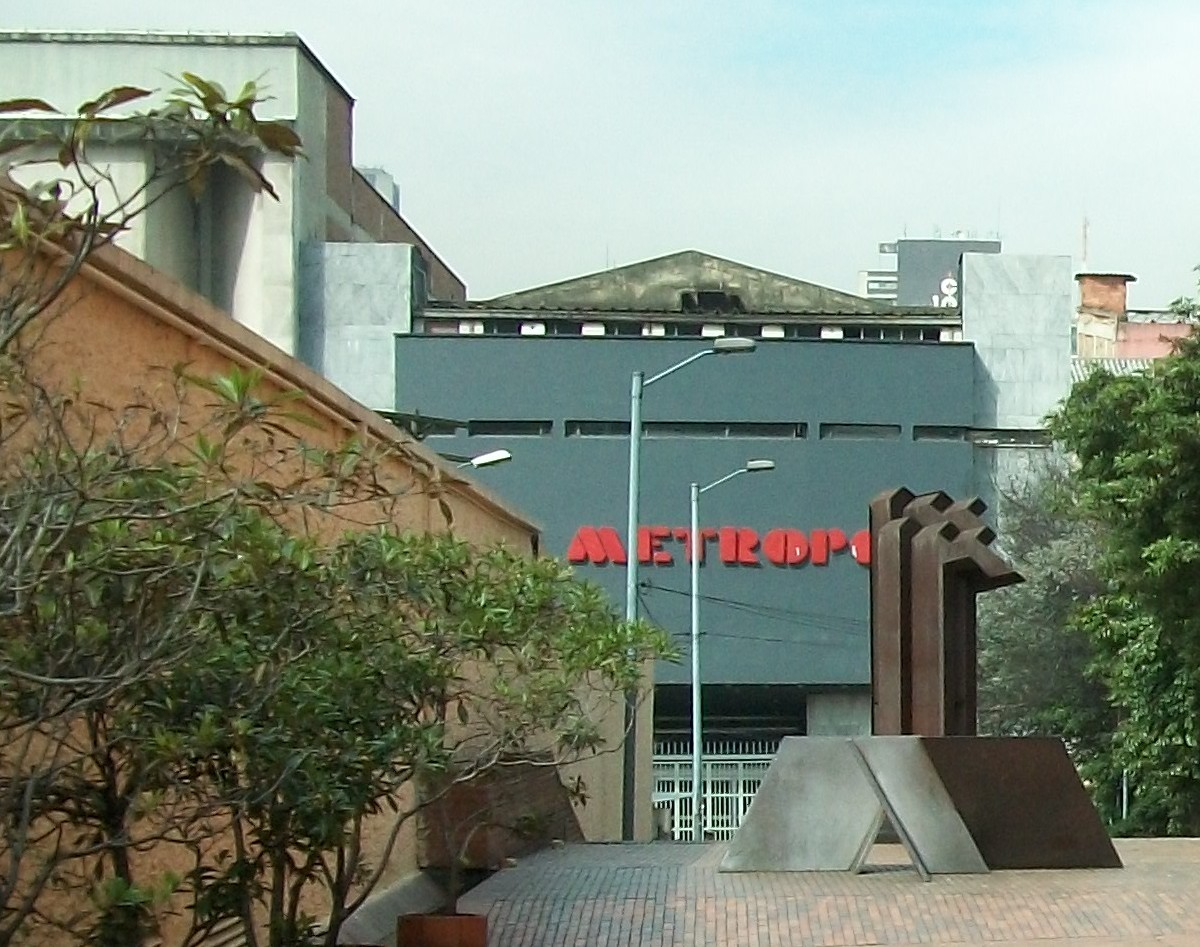
- Interactive map of Teatro Metropol
- Address: Calle 24 # 6-31; Bogotá; Colombia
- Capacity: 2,500 standing or 1,100 people seated.

Construction
- Opened: 1972

The Teatro Metropol is a theater for audiovisual and artistic performances in Bogotá, Colombia. Allowing 2,500 people standing or 1,100 people seated, it has the greatest capacity of any theater in the city of Bogotá.

It was constructed in the 1970s, and has been remodeled carefully to make it a stage for performing high impact shows because it has the infrastructure, acoustics and technology necessary to make any kind of cultural shows. It has restrooms, boxes, and a food and meeting room.

Originally it opened as a movie theater, splendor that is overshadowed by the appearance of multiplex cinema from different companies who marketed in malls.

From 2016 it was rented to a Christian organization, which no longer returned to make concerts; and it is uncertain when they will return to this chamber concerts.

== Events ==
Today this complex is used for organizing concerts due to the versatility of the place. Among the artists presented in this exhibition are:

Artista	Fecha
Alika	March 18, 2006
White Lion & Kronos	April 29, 2008
Orishas & Zion Stereo	October 31, 2008
Opeth, Brand New Blood, Antípoda & Total Death	April 1, 2009
Arch Enemy, Neurosis, Desecrate & Angershield	April 30, 2009
Amon Amarth & Soulburner	May 14, 2009
Barón Rojo	June 6, 2009
The Skatalites	June 13, 2009
Biohazard, Sin Salida & El Sagrado	June 23, 2009
Nortec Collective	September 12, 2009
Belphegor & God Dethroned	September 20, 2009
Killswitch Engage, Brand New Blood, Burden Of Hate, Heathless, Descomunal & Falcore	October 11, 2009
Calle 13	October 30, 2009
Don Tetto	October 31, 2009
Killswitch Engage	November 8, 2009
Tiamat	November 11, 2009
DragonForce & Introspección	November 13, 2009
Skid Row & Sigma	November 21, 2009
Epica	November 28, 2009
Mortal Sin	November 29, 2009
WarCry	December 4, 2009
La Pestilencia, Las Pirañas Amazónicas, Nepentes, Koyi k utho, El Sie7e & Pornomotora	December 5, 2009
Venom & Agony	December 6, 2009
Systema Solar	Diciembre 7, 2009
Fear Factory	Diciembre 9, 2009
Squirrel Nut Zippers & Velandia y La Tigra	Diciembre 11, 2009
Cannibal Corpse	Febrero 17, 2010
Korpiklaani	Marzo 7, 2010
Nile	Marzo 12, 2010
P.O.D.	Abril 16, 2010
Easy Star All-Stars	Mayo 14, 2010
Draco Rosa	Mayo 18, 2010
Dark Tranquility, The Agonist, Neurosis, Kilcrops, Introspección, Loathsome Faith, In Lust & Occultus	Junio 5, 2010
Vive la Fête	Julio 30, 2010
Hypocrisy	September 28, 2010
Lamb of God, Nosense Premonition & Discord	October 2, 2010
Rhapsody of Fire	November 24, 2010
Jeff Beck	December 3, 2010
El ultimo ke zierre	December 5, 2010
Kamelot, Simone Simons, Fabio Lione & Albatroz	April 12, 2011
Tarja Turunen	March 8, 2011
Finntroll	May 3, 2011
Testament, Zagreb, Witchtrap & Cuantica	Agost 13, 2011
DevilDriver & Revez	Agost 16, 2011
Coheed and Cambria & Stayway	September 20, 2011
Bring Me the Horizon & The Worst Situation Ever	October 8, 2011
Satyricon & Thy Endless Wrath	November 1, 2011
Parkway Drive	November 19, 2011
Steve Aoki	December 9, 2011
Cannibal Corpse, Suicide Silence, The Black Dahlia Murder, Betray The Kidnapper, High Rate Extinction, Addicted To Chaos & Scofield Nakamura	December 10, 2011
Children of Bodom, Bloddfate & Avalon	December 12, 2011
Don Tetto & Tres de Corazón	December 17, 2011
Apocalyptica & Gaias Pendulum	January 22, 2012
Marea	February 18, 2012
Dimmu Borgir & Nosferatu	February 27, 2012
Haggard	February 28, 2012
Morrissey y Kristeen Young	March 17, 2012
Amon Amarth	March 22, 2012
Lamb of God & Hatebreed	April 7, 2012
Sodom, Witchtrap, Highway & Guerra Total	April 13, 2012
Chromeo	May 19, 2012
Barón Rojo	June 8, 2012
Nach	November 11, 2012
Squirrel Nut Zippers & Monsieur Periné	March 1, 2013
Annihilator	May 30, 2013
Bajofondo	June 28, 2013
Avantasia	July 1, 2013
Superlitio y Los Amigos Invisibles	agost 23, 2013
Asking Alexandria, Motionless in White, Mindless Mechanism, Dead Maddison y The Hidden Valley	agosto 30, 2013
Skillet	October 6, 2013
Ghost & Electric Sasquatch	agost 26, 2014
Death, Kilcrops & Desecrate	September 16, 2014
Haggard	September 27, 2014
Richie Kotzen	October 18, 2014
Kreator & Masacre	October 21, 2014
Behemoth	November 18, 2014
Metronomy	November 21, 2014
Carcass, Brujeria, Día De Los Muertos, Inquisition, Reencarnación, Random Revenge & Narcipsychotic	December 6, 2014
Arch Enemy, Therion y Halcycon Way	February 1, 2015
Raven, Morbid Saint & Wehrmacht	march 8, 2015
Sonata Arctica	March 19, 2015
No Te Va Gustar	May 2, 2015
Extreme & Supremacy	February 13, 2014
Bullet for My Valentine, Motionless in White, Deadfate & Brand New Blood	July 18, 2015
Above & Beyond	July 25, 2015
PXNDX	September 12, 2015
Fat Joe	October 16, 2015
Gogol Bordello, Sidestepper, Mateo Rivano y Doktor Chiflamicas	October 31, 2015
Matisyahu	January 26, 2016
Bacilos	November, 2 2018
