= Siete =

Siete is the Spanish word for seven. It may refer to:

- Sie7e (born 1977), a Puerto Rican singer
- Sietes (born 1974), a Spanish footballer
- El Sie7e, a Colombian band
- LaSiete, a Spanish television channel that aired from 2008 to 2014
- Siete (album), a 2003 album by Carlos Varela
- Siete, an album by Presuntos Implicados
- El Siete, a promotional name for the TV network Azteca 7
- Sie7e +, a 2018 album by Danna Paola
- Siete Foods, an American manufacturer of Mexican-style snack foods
