= Asylum Tour =

Asylum Tour can refer to:

- Asylum Tour (Disturbed), a music tour from 2010 to 2011 by the band Disturbed
- Asylum Tour (Kiss), a music tour from 1985 to 1986 by the band Kiss
