= Tweety González =

Argentine musician

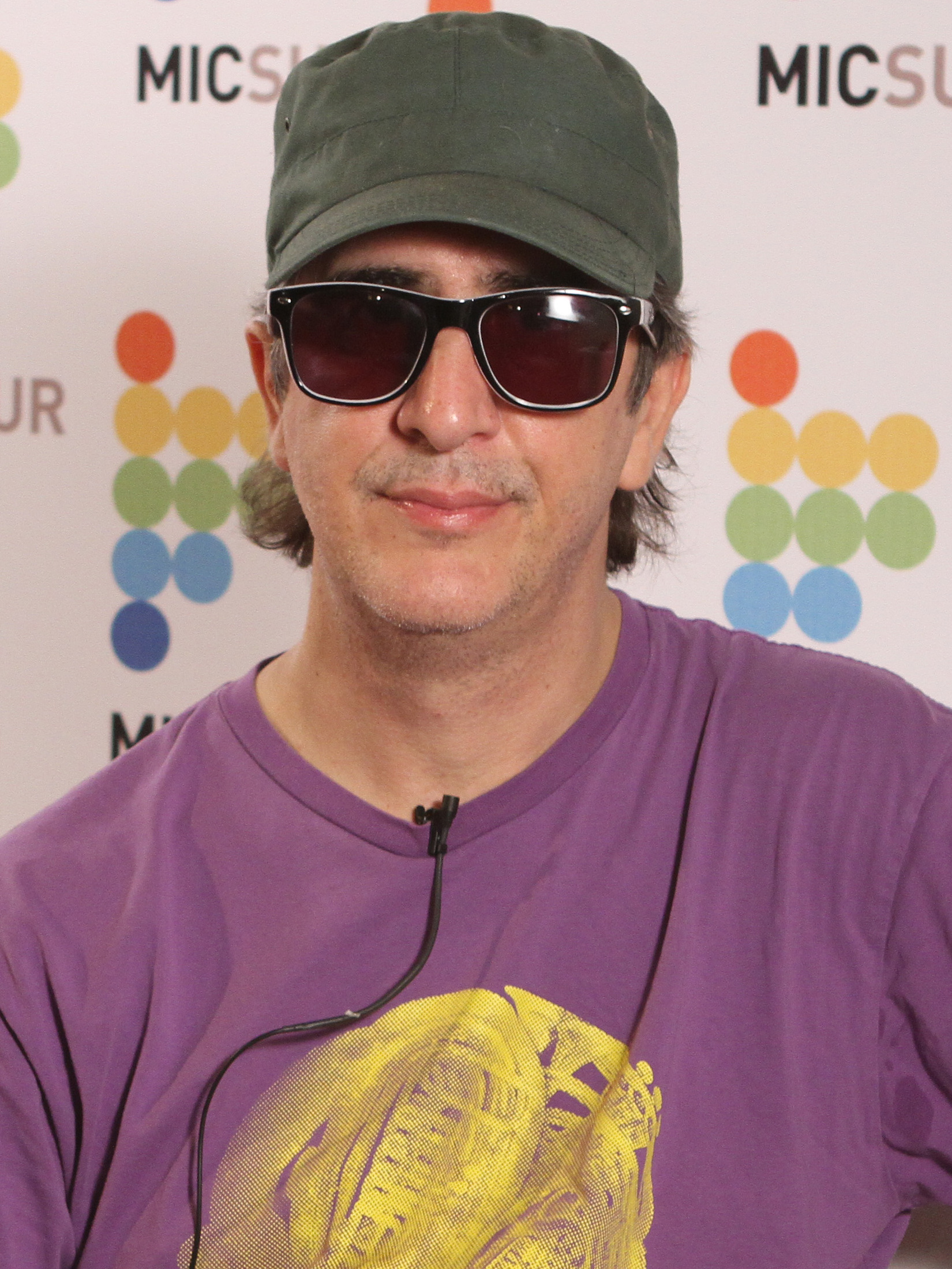

Background information
- Also known as: Tweety González
- Born: Fabián Andrés González Amado; 1963 (age 61–62)
- Genres: Rock, electronic
- Occupation(s): Musician, record producer
- Instruments: Keyboards; sampler
- Years active: 1983–present
- Website: tweetygonzalez.com

Fabián Andrés González Amado (born 1963), known by his stage name Tweety González, is an Argentine musician and record producer. He is mostly known for being the touring keyboardist for the rock band Soda Stereo and musician Fito Páez.

González is also a music producer and has worked with artists Shakira, Gustavo Cerati, Illya Kuryaki and the Valderramas, Luis Alberto Spinetta, Superlitio, Famasloop and several others. Gustavo Cerati's 2006 Ahí vamos, in which Tweety played keyboards, won the Latin Grammy for Best Rock Solo Vocal Album.

== Early life and career ==
Born in the Versalles neighborhood of Buenos Aires, Tweety learned as a child to play the achordeon and studied flute and percussion at the Collegium Musicum as well as piano at the Conservatorio Municipal Manuel de Falla and later became influenced by jazz music and Argentine and English rock music.

His first professional work was as a keyboardist with Celeste Carballo for the Mi Voz Renacerá album. In 1983 he was invited to play with Moro-Satragni. In 1984 he entered Fito Páez´s band with whom González recorded as a keyboardist, programmer and producer, including El Amor Después Del Amor (1992), the highest selling album of Argentine rock. In 1989 he became keyboardist and programmer of Soda Stereo and recorded albums Rex Mix, Canción Animal (1990), Dynamo (1992), Sueño Stereo (1995), MTV Unplugged (1996), El Último Concierto (1997) and Me Verás Volver (2007). In 1990, he worked as a producer in Sandra Mihanovich and Celeste Carballo's album Mujer contra mujer. In 1995 Tweety and Páez produced album Algo Mejor by Fabiana Cantilo, which includes hit Mi Enfermedad, vocal production by Tweety.

In 1999, González started rock band Ácida with Alina Gandini in Buenos Aires and the band later moved to Los Ángeles and recorded album La Vida Real with Sonic360 Records, produced by Chris Allison and won La Banda Elástica magazine award for best US-based Latin rock band. The band ended in 2004 in Buenos Aires. In 2002 he produced album Tripping Tropicana by Colombian band Superlitio, nominated to a Latin Grammy.

González produced Peruvian band Líbido albums Hembra in 2002 (winner of an MTV Music Award) and Lo Último que Hable Ayer in 2005. The same year he produced album Día De Fiebre by Adicta and album Rocanrrolero by Emmanuel Horvilleur, worked together with Gustavo Cerati in producing album Oral Fixation Vol. 2 by Shakira and recorded Cerati´s fourth album, Ahí Vamos, which won two Latin Grammy Awards and several Gardel Awards. In 2006 Tweety produced Ecuadorean band Rocola Bacalao and Andrés and Charly Alberti band Mole for Sony Music. In 2007 Tweety won a Latin Grammy Award for song La Excepción and produced album Tan Real by Argentine band Los Tipitos and record-selling album Mediocre by Mexican artist Ximena Sarinana, nominated to a Latin Grammy. In 2007 Tweety, Leandro Fresco and Leo García took part in Soda Stereo´s last tour. In 2008, he produced Joaquin Levinton band Sponsors. In 2009 González opened music company Tornasolado with Jorge Klinoff, located at El Pie Recording Studios in Buenos Aires, and worked with Capri, Richard Coleman, Amel, Juguete Ruidoso, Hamacas al Río, De Saloon, Mink, Rescate, Dietrich, Paola Vergara, Carlos Méndez, Kevin Johansen, Viuda e Hijas de Roque Enroll, Arbolito, Enero Será Mío, Rosario Ortega, Ojas, Poli Salustro, Paradise, David Bolzoni, Ulises Butron, Benito Cerati, among others.

In 2013 Tweety agreed with The Orchard the digital distribution of his brand Twitin Records. In 2015 Argentine Fundación Konex named González Artistic Producer of the Decade.
