= Pop*Porn =

Studio album by Líbido
- Released: July 1, 2002
- Recorded: 2002
- Studio: Estudio Panda (Buenos Aires, Argentina)
- Genre: Alternative rock
- Length: 47:07
- Language: Spanish
- Label: De Lanuca
- Producer: Duane Baron

Líbido chronology
Hembra (2000)	Pop*Porn (2002)	Lo Último que Hable Ayer (2005)

Singles from Libido
- 1. "Fragil" Released: early 2002; 2. "No Será lo Mismo Sin Ti" Released: latter 2002

Pop*Porn is the third studio album by Líbido, released in 2002. With the production of Duane Baron, it was recorded and mixed at Estudios Panda.

== Track listing ==
No.	Title	Writer(s)	Length
1.	"Espermato"	Jauegui	2:47
2.	"Estoy Tan Gris"	Fischman	3:36
3.	"Frágil"	Hidalgo	3:38
4.	"No Será lo Mismo Sin Ti"	Jauregui	3:36
5.	"Invencible"	Fischman	2:55
6.	"Hambre"	Jauregui	3:56
7.	"El Vampiro"	Jauegui	3:46
8.	"Como Estás"	Fischman	4:30
9.	"Lunático"	Jauregui	2:28
10.	"Desafiante"	Fischman	3:42
11.	"Esther Fe"	Hidalgo	3:52
12.	"Sin Rencor"	Fischman	4:39
