= Dog Eat Dog (2008 film) =

2008 film

- Theatrical release poster
- Directed by: Carlos Moreno
- Written by: Carlos Moreno; Alonso Torres
- Produced by: Diego F. Ramirez
- Starring: Marlon Moreno; Oscar Borda; Blas Jaramillo; Paulina Rivas; Alvaro Rodriguez
- Cinematography: Juan Carlos Gil
- Edited by: Felipe Guerrero; Carlos Moreno; Santiago Palau Mera
- Music by: Sultana
- Production companies: 64 A Films; Antorcha Films; Dynamo; EFE-X Cine; Hangar Films; Patofeo Films; Proimagenes en Movimiento
- Distributed by: IFC Films (US)
- Release dates: 18 January 2008 (Sundance); 18 April 2008 (Colombia)
- Running time: 106 minutes
- Country: Colombia
- Language: Spanish
- Box office: $671,816

Perro Come Perro (English: Dog Eat Dog) is a 2008 Colombian thriller film by director Carlos Moreno. The film depicts the violence among the low life, crime-filled life of some criminals in the city of Cali. The film was shown at the 2008 Sundance Film Festival. The soundtrack of the film included a song by Colombian band Superlitio.

== Plot ==
Victor Peñaranda and two other men torture a man known as "El Mellizo" (The Twin) in order to recover the money stolen from "El Orejón" (Big Ears), the leader of the underworld of Cali. Don Pablo, intermediary of "El Orejón" and the thugs, orders a search for the money around the house. Peñaranda finds the money and decides to steal it, claiming he did not find any money inside the house.

Meanwhile, "El Orejón" attends the funeral of his godson William Medina. A devotee of witchcraft, "El Orejón" hires the witch Iris to put a curse on Medina's murderer. As Don Pablo failed to find the money, "El Orejón" calls Silvio Sierra to help with the task. Sierra pairs Peñaranda with Eusebio Benítez to complete the mission and they stay in a shared hotel room. While they wait for instructions, Benítez has sex with a woman and Peñaranda unexpectedly answers the call from a man demanding to know the whereabouts of a woman named Adela. Later, they meet Sierra and go to the funeral of the first "Twin", waiting to find the other "Twin". The "Twin" does not appear, and Don Pablo suspects Peñaranda has the money. Peñaranda denies and tries to call his wife secretly to use the stolen money to flee from Colombia with her and his daughter.

Benítez began suffering from nightmares because of the curse put on him by the witch Iris, while he, Peñaranda and Sierra find the other "Twin". The "Twin" escapes but they capture and interrogate his lawyer. As he says that one of the assassins who had killed the first "Twin" could have stolen the money, Sierra murders the lawyer and throws him into a river. Meanwhile, Benítez is advised about the curse by a friend, who recommends him to remove an object from the right hand of the dead.

Peñaranda is invited to a conversation with Don Pablo in a coffee shop. However, Don Pablo does not arrive and Peñaranda reads in a newspaper that his friends were killed and unsuccessfully tries to call his wife to communicate it. While "El Orejón" doubts the effects of Iris's curse, Benítez suffers from its effects. Peñaranda tries to call his wife to flee with the money but she does not want to see him after discovering the origin of the money. "El Orejón" interrogates Benítez who claims he knows nothing about Medina's murder and whether Peñaranda stole the money. The leader of the underworld laughs and demonstrates his power by killing a random man in the middle of a square.

Peñaranda tries to escape alone with money but Sierra and Benítez arrive; while the latter locks himself in the bathroom, Sierra says to Peñaranda that "El Orejón" ordered Peñaranda to kill Benítez. That same night, Benítez goes to the graveyard and complies with what was recommended by his friend. The other day, Sierra tells Peñaranda and Benítez that the other "Twin" was captured. Sierra also answer the call from the man looking for Adela and says that she was murdered. While the three men go to a sand factory, Sierra tells Peñaranda and Benítez that Don Pablo had died the previous day.

At the sand factory, the "Twin" states emphatically that Peñaranda killed his brother and stole the money, but Peñaranda denies it. In doubt, "El Orejón" instructs Peñaranda to dismember alive the "Twin" with a chainsaw. When Peñaranda kills the "Twin", "El Orejón" concludes that Peñaranda is really with the money and threatens him, saying he would kill his wife and daughter if he does not retrieve the money in two hours. As "El Orejón" leaves the place, Sierra orders Peñaranda to kill Benítez. However, Benítez beats Sierra to death, while Peñaranda kills one of the "El Orejón"' bodyguard. When Peñaranda is prepared to kill Benítez, Benítez asks him for a compromise so they can kill "El Orejón" together. Once they manage to kill "El Orejón", Peñaranda abandons Benítez and reaches the hotel, killing a policeman and the hotel manager. However, he is beaten to death by the burly mad man who was seeking Adela; this man in turn is killed by Benítez, who flees with the money but dies tormented by the curse.

== Cast ==
- Marlon Moreno as Victor Peñaranda
- Óscar Borda as Eusebio Benítez
- Blas Jaramillo as "El Orejón"
- Paulina Rivas as Iris
- Álvaro Rodríguez as Silvio Sierra
- Andrés Toro as Zabala

== Release ==
=== Critical reception ===
Dog Eat Dog received negative reviews from critics. On review aggregator website Rotten Tomatoes, the film has a 20% rating based on 5 reviews.

=== Accolades ===
Nominated

Goya Awards

- Best Spanish Language Foreign Film
