= Hembra =

Studio album by Líbido
- Released: April 9, 2000
- Recorded: 1999–2000
- Studio: Estudio Panda (Buenos Aires, Argentina)
- Genre: Alternative rock
- Length: 39:59
- Language: Spanish
- Label: Sony Music
- Producer: Líbido

Líbido chronology
Libido (1998)	Hembra (2000)	Pop*Porn (2002)

Singles from Libido
- 1. "Tres"; 2. "En Esta Habitación"; 3. "No voy a verte mas" 4. "Respirando"; 5. "Hembra"

Hembra (Female) is the second studio album by Líbido, released in 2000. The album sold, in Peru alone, one hundred thousand copies, and outside of Peru it sold another hundred thousand. This would be the beginning of the Libido Era, in which they would take over the Rock market, as its icon.

== Track listing ==
No.	Title	Writer(s)	Length
1.	"Tres"	Jauegui	3:42
2.	"Respirando"	Jauregui	2:54
3.	"Hembra"	Fischman	4:11
4.	"Sal"	Fischman, Hidalgo	4:38
5.	"Nectar"	Fischman, Hidalgo	3:01
6.	"Eterno"	Jauregui	4:05
7.	"Reset"	Jauegui	3:45
8.	"En Esta Habitación"	Fischman	4:32
9.	"Tu Rostro"	Fischman	4:29
10.	"Un Momento en Mil"	Jauregui	3:26
11.	"Tiempos Tranquilos"	Fischman	3:44
12.	"No Voy a Verte Mas"	Jauregui	3:50

== Album credits ==
=== Production ===
- Executive Producer: Tweety González

=== Personnel ===
- Vocals: Salim Vera
- Engineered by Pablo Caceres, Doug Trantow and Ricardo Troilo
- Production Assistant: Demian Chorovicz
- Percussion, Bateria, Coros: Jeffry Fischman
- Piano, Keyboards, Programming, Digital Editing: Tweety González
- Arranger: Libido and Tweety González
- Mastering: Eddy Schreyer
- Guitar: Salim Vera

== Sales ==
Region	Certification	Certified units/sales
Argentina	—	5,000
