= Un Día Nuevo =

Studio album by Líbido
- Released: July 16, 2009
- Recorded: 2007–2009
- Genre: Pop rock
- Language: Spanish
- Label: Circus Music
- Producer: Duane Baron

Líbido chronology
Lo Último que Hable Ayer (2005)	Un Día Nuevo (2009)

Singles from Un Día Nuevo
- 1. "Nadie Sabe lo que Vendra" Released: April 4, 2009; 2. "Malvada"

Un Día Nuevo (A New Day) is the fifth studio album by Peruvian rock group Libido. The initial works for the album started in 2008 with the collaboration of sound engineer Rafael De La Lama, Tweety Gonzáles in pre-production and Duane Baron in the production and later on, recording in Los Angeles. The album started to be mixed in London at the Sarm Studios, the process continued in Lima and was finished by Andrew Scheps in Los Angeles.

== Release and promotion ==
Months before the release of Un Día Nuevo, Libido had begun a publicity strategy to the mobile phone network Claro. The day of release Libido makes a feast celebrating the fifth studio album released.

== Track listing ==
Original track listing
No.	Title	Writer(s)	Length
1.	"Enloquece"	Antonio Jauregui / Salim Vera
2.	"Un día nuevo"	Salim Vera
3.	"Nadie sabe lo que vendrá"	Antonio Jauregui	3:13
4.	"Malvada"	Antonio Jauregui
5.	"Sentir que hoy"	Manolo Hidalgo
6.	"Mundo Perfecto"	Manolo Hidalgo
7.	"Octubre"	Manolo Hidalgo
8.	"Something"	Antonio Jauregui
9.	"Disparar"	Antonio Jauregui
10.	"Mi mente explota"	Manolo Hidalgo
11.	"Cielo apunta abajo"	Ivan Mindreau
12.	"Hablar no es necesario"	Antonio Jauregui
13.	"Amor anestesiado"	Ivan Mindreau

== Release history ==
Country	Date	Label	Format	Catalog number
Perú	16 July 2009	Circus Music	CD	-
