= The Mills (band) =

Colombian rock band

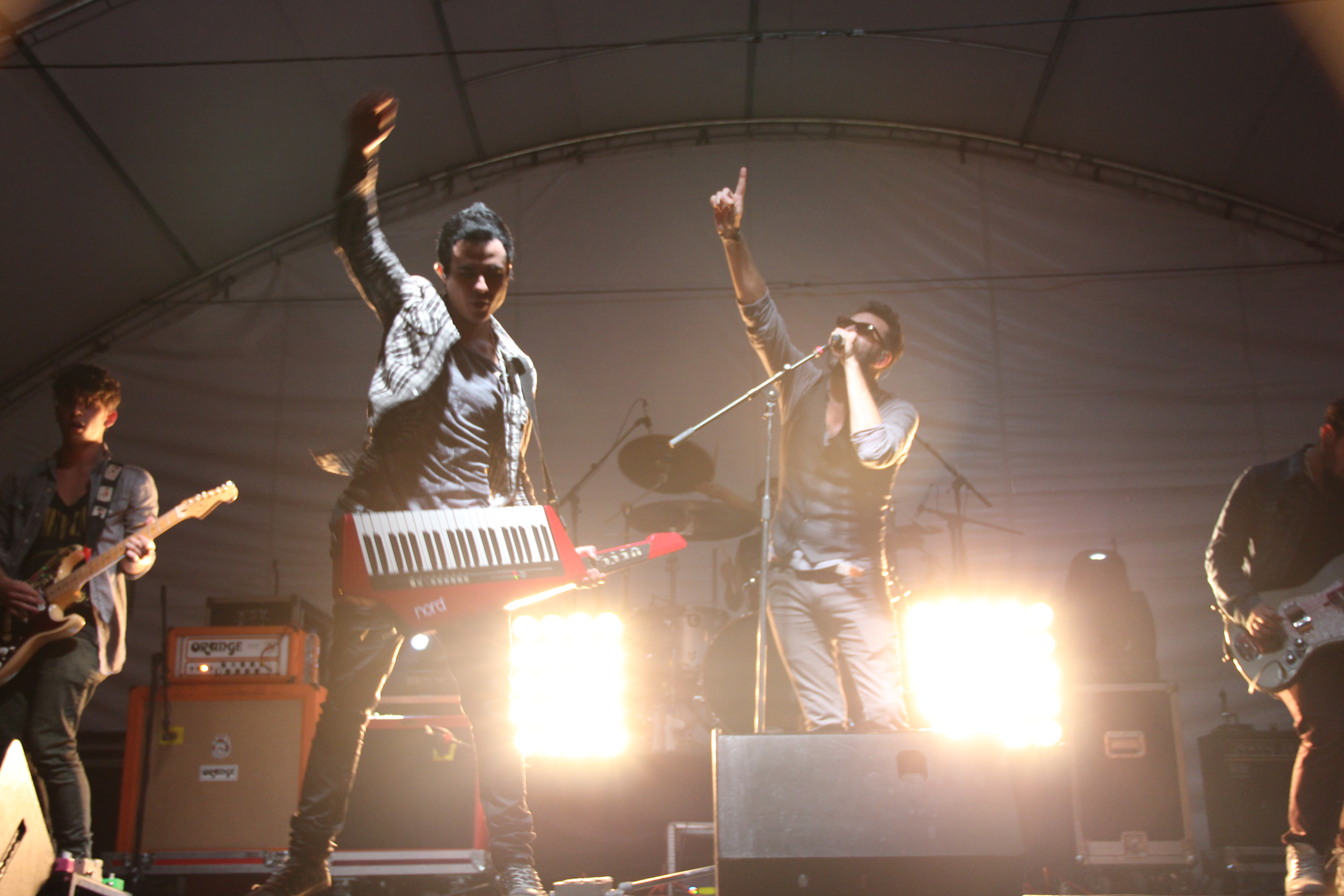

Background information
- Origin: Bogotá, Colombia
- Genres: Rock, alternative rock
- Years active: 2007–present
- Members: Bako (Álvaro Charry); Geogy (Jorge Luis Bello); Dizee (Diego Cáceres); Ray (Ramón Gutiérrez); Cadavid (Diego Cadavid)
- Website: themillsband.com

The Mills is a Colombian rock band based in Bogotá. The band's musical style is greatly influenced by Alternative rock. Their first album, Babel, reached No. 1 at Colombian radio stations Radioactiva and La X. They are managed by Roberto Andrade Dirak.

== History ==
2007-2009: Influenced by alternative rock bands U2, Coldplay and Radiohead, the band was formed in 2007 and released an EP entitled Don't Care What They Think. It featured English lyrics and was produced by Luis Charry, guitarist for The Hall Effect.

The band gained recognition as one of the new leading acts in Colombian rock, according to an article in the Colombian edition of Rolling Stone Magazine, which paid compliments to the band's British influences and sound quality.

In 2008, The Mills released two singles, "Before I Go to Sleep" and "Let It Go". The Mills also were invited to play as an opening act at "Colombia Fest", supporting R.E.M. and The Mars Volta.

2009-2011: Babel The mills released their first album: Babel. This album was recorded in Bogotá by the discografy of Cabeza de raton and it shows a mixture of alternative rock, indie and latin rock. This first album has 13 songs in Spanish and English with great singles like: "Before i go to sleep" and "Abran fuego". This album also has a cover of "Lobo hombre en paris" of the Spanish rock band La Union. This singles rise up the Mills to the top of the best Colombian rockbands.

2011-2013: Guadalupe They released a second named Gudalupe,

2014: The band show their new single: "El amor duele" from a new next album.

== Members ==
- Bako (Álvaro Charry) – vocals
- Geogy (Jorge Luis Bello) – guitar
- Dizee (Diego Cáceres) – keyboards, backing vocals
- Ray (Ramón Gutiérrez) – bass
- Cadavid (Diego Cadavid) – drums

== Discography ==
- Don't Care What They Think (EP). Independent (2007)
- Babel. (2009)
- Guadalupe. (2011)
