= Saurom =

Spanish folk metal band

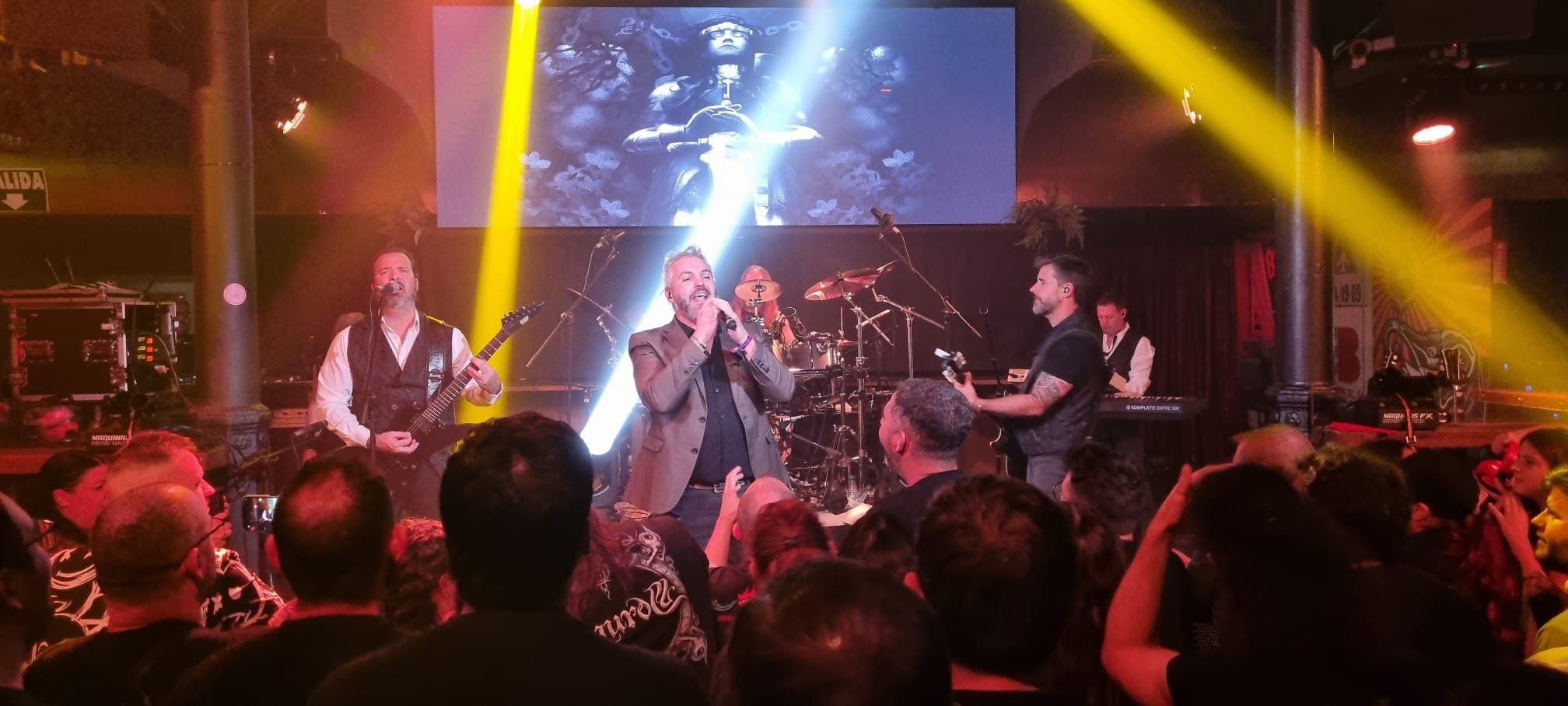
- Saurom performing in 2024

Background information
- Origin: San Fernando, Andalusia, Spain
- Genres: Folk metal, celtic metal, power metal, heavy metal
- Years active: 1996 – present
- Label: Zaluster Producciones
- Members: Miguel Ángel Franco; Antonio Ruiz; Raúl Rueda; José Gallardo; Santiago Carrasco; Narci Lara
- Website: saurom.com

Saurom (formerly Saurom Lamderth) is a Spanish folk metal band based in the city of San Fernando, Cádiz. Its lyrics are often about traditional legends and poems. Some of their songs deal with literature stories, like The Lord of the Rings or A Song of Ice and Fire.

== Discography ==
=== Demos ===
- La cripta del duende (1996)
- Regreso a las Tierras Medias (1997)
- Legado de juglares (1999)
- Orígenes (2000)

=== Studio albums ===
- El guardián de las melodías perdidas (2001)
- Sombras del Este (2002)
- Legado de juglares (2004)
  - Sinfonías de los bosques (2006)
- JuglarMetal (2006)
- Once romances desde al-Ándalus (2008)
  - Romances from al-Ándalus (2008)
- Maryam (2010)
- Vida (2012)
- Sueños (2015)
- La Magia de la Luna (2017)
- Música (2020)
- El Pájaro Fantasma (Instrumental) (2023)
- El Pájaro Fantasma (2023)
- El Principito (2025)
