= Asylum Tour (Disturbed) =

2010–2011 concert tour by Disturbed

- Tour by Disturbed
- Location: Europe; North America; Oceania; South America
- Associated album: Asylum
- Start date: August 13, 2010
- End date: August 27, 2011
- Legs: 8
- No. of shows: 146

Disturbed concert chronology
- Indestructible Tour (2008–2009); Asylum Tour (2010–2011); Immortalized Tour (2015–2017)

The Asylum Tour was a 2010–11 concert tour by American heavy metal band Disturbed in support of the group's fifth studio album, Asylum, which was released in August 2010.

The tour began in mid-August 2010 with an appearance as part of a series of concerts held during the Sturgis Motorcycle Rally in Sturgis, South Dakota, United States. This was followed by the commencement of the Uproar Festival, a North American touring event which features Disturbed as headliners and includes acts such as Avenged Sevenfold, Stone Sour and Hellyeah. The festival began in Minneapolis and culminated in Madison, Wisconsin in early October.

In October 2010, it was reported that David Draiman was diagnosed with a "serious throat condition" and, as a result, ten headline U.S. shows following the culmination of the Uproar Festival were canceled. The group reconvened in mid-November for a European leg of the "Taste of Chaos" package tour, which featured Papa Roach, Buckcherry and Halestorm, as well as Disturbed. The leg began in Helsinki and wrapped up in Nottingham, United Kingdom in mid-December.

In mid-January 2011, the band commenced a U.S. leg of the self-created package tour, "Music as a Weapon V", beginning in Bloomington, Illinois. The tour featured co-headliners Korn, as well as acts Sevendust and In This Moment. In April 2011, the tour came to Oceania, with acts Trivium, As I Lay Dying and Forgiven Rival in tow. The Oceania leg began in Perth, Australia and finished in Christchurch, New Zealand.

Lead singer David Draiman has stated that the production levels for the tour will surpass those on previous tours, with an aspect "that no one has ever seen from Disturbed live — very theatrical, very dramatic, very visually stimulating". Radio show hardDrive commented on the stage show, calling it "a total assault of the senses".

== Tour dates ==
Date	City	Country	Venue/Event
North America ("Uproar Festival")
August 13, 2010 ^{[1]}	Sturgis	United States	Buffalo Chip Campground
August 17, 2010	Minneapolis	United States	Target Center
August 18, 2010	Bonner Springs	United States	Sandstone Amphitheater
August 20, 2010	Council Bluffs	United States	Westfair Amphitheater
August 21, 2010	Tinley Park	United States	First Midwest Bank Amphitheatre
August 22, 2010	Corfu	United States	Darien Lake Performing Arts Center
August 24, 2010	Columbus	United States	Lifestyle Communities Pavilion
August 25, 2010	Toronto	Canada	Molson Canadian Amphitheatre
August 27, 2010	Scranton	United States	Toyota Pavilion at Montage Mountain
August 28, 2010	Saratoga Springs	United States	Saratoga Performing Arts Center
August 29, 2010	Holmdel	United States	PNC Bank Arts Center
August 31, 2010	Bristow	United States	Jiffy Lube Live
September 1, 2010	Charlotte	United States	Verizon Wireless Amphitheatre Charlotte
September 3, 2010	Pelham	United States	Verizon Wireless Music Center
September 4, 2010	Atlanta	United States	Aaron's Amphitheatre at Lakewood
September 5, 2010	Tampa	United States	1-800-ASK-GARY Amphitheatre
September 8, 2010	Tulsa	United States	BOK Center
September 10, 2010	Dallas	United States	SuperPages.com Center
September 11, 2010	Corpus Christi	United States	Concrete Street Amphitheater
September 12, 2010	The Woodlands	United States	Cynthia Woods Mitchell Pavilion
September 14, 2010	Greenwood Village	United States	Comfort Dental Amphitheatre
September 15, 2010	West Valley City	United States	USANA Amphitheatre
September 17, 2010	Irvine	United States	Verizon Wireless Amphitheatre
September 18, 2010	Chula Vista	United States	Cricket Wireless Amphitheatre
September 19, 2010	Tempe	United States	Beach Park Amphitheater
September 21, 2010	Bakersfield	United States	Rabobank Arena
September 22, 2010	Wheatland	United States	Sleep Train Amphitheatre
September 24, 2010	Post Falls	United States	Greyhound Park
September 25, 2010	Auburn	United States	White River Amphitheatre
September 26, 2010	Vancouver	Canada	Pacific Coliseum
September 28, 2010	Edmonton	Canada	Rexall Place
September 29, 2010	Calgary	Canada	Pengrowth Saddledome
September 30, 2010	Saskatoon	Canada	Credit Union Centre
October 2, 2010	Winnipeg	Canada	MTS Centre
October 3, 2010	Fargo	United States	Fargodome
October 4, 2010	Madison	United States	Veterans Memorial Coliseum
Europe ("Taste of Chaos" Tour)
November 15, 2010	Helsinki	Finland	Hartwall Arena
November 17, 2010	Stockholm	Sweden	Hovet
November 19, 2010	Oslo	Norway	Oslo Spektrum
November 20, 2010	Copenhagen	Denmark	K.B. Hallen
November 22, 2010	Berlin	Germany	Columbiahalle
November 24, 2010	Vienna	Austria	Gasometer
November 25, 2010	Munich	Germany	Zenith
November 26, 2010	Winterthur	Switzerland	Eishalle Deutweg
November 28, 2010	Freiburg im Breisgau	Germany	Rothaus Arena
November 29, 2010	Hamburg	Germany	Alsterdorfer Sporthalle
December 1, 2010	Düsseldorf	Germany	Philips Halle
December 2, 2010	Amsterdam	Netherlands	Heineken Music Hall
December 3, 2010	Esch-sur-Alzette	Luxembourg	Rockhal
December 5, 2010	Brussels	Belgium	Forest National
December 7, 2010	Birmingham	England	National Indoor Arena
December 8, 2010	London	England	Wembley Arena
December 9, 2010	Plymouth	England	Plymouth Pavilions
December 11, 2010	Glasgow	Scotland	SECC
December 12, 2010	Manchester	England	Manchester Central
December 13, 2010	Nottingham	England	Trent FM Arena
North America ("Music as a Weapon V")
January 14, 2011 ^{[2]}	Bloomington	United States	U.S. Cellular Coliseum
January 15, 2011 ^{[2]}	Des Moines	United States	Wells Fargo Arena ♦
January 16, 2011 ^{[2]}	Rockford	United States	Rockford MetroCentre
January 18, 2011 ^{[2]}	Hershey	United States	Giant Center ♦
January 19, 2011 ^{[2]}	Rochester	United States	Main Street Armory
January 21, 2011 ^{[2]}	New York City	United States	Hammerstein Ballroom ♦
January 22, 2011 ^{[2]}	West Long Branch	United States	Monmouth University
January 23, 2011 ^{[2]}	Glens Falls	United States	Glens Falls Civic Center ♦
January 25, 2011 ^{[2]}	Norfolk	United States	Ted Constant Convocation Center
January 26, 2011 ^{[2]}	Morgantown	United States	West Virginia University ♦
January 28, 2011 ^{[2]}	Uncasville	United States	Mohegan Sun Arena
January 29, 2011 ^{[2]}	Portland	United States	Cumberland County Civic Center ♦
January 30, 2011 ^{[2]}	Atlantic City	United States	House of Blues
February 1, 2011 ^{[2]}	Winston-Salem	United States	Entertainment-Sports Complex ♦
February 2, 2011 ^{[2]}	Fayetteville	United States	Cumberland County Crown Coliseum
February 4, 2011 ^{[2]}	Nashville	United States	Bridgestone Arena ♦
February 5, 2011 ^{[2]}	Biloxi	United States	Mississippi Coast Coliseum
February 8, 2011 ^{[2]}	Corpus Christi	United States	Concrete Street Amphitheater ♦
March 5, 2011 ^{[2]}	Lubbock	United States	Fair Park Coliseum ♦
March 6, 2011 ^{[2]}	McAllen	United States	McAllen Convention Center
March 8, 2011 ^{[2]}	Belton	United States	Bell County Expo Center ♦
March 9, 2011 ^{[2]}	Las Cruces	United States	Pan American Center
March 11, 2011 ^{[2]}	Tucson	United States	Tucson Convention Center ♦
March 12, 2011 ^{[2]}	Las Vegas	United States	The Joint
March 13, 2011 ^{[2]}	Sacramento	United States	ARCO Arena ♦
March 15, 2011 ^{[2]}	Portland	United States	Veterans Memorial Coliseum
March 17, 2011 ^{[2]}	Yakima	United States	Yakima SunDome ♦
March 18, 2011 ^{[2]}	Missoula	United States	Adams Event Center
March 20, 2011 ^{[2]}	Brookings	United States	Swiftel Center ♦
March 21, 2011 ^{[2]}	La Crosse	United States	La Crosse Center
March 22, 2011 ^{[2]}	Mankato	United States	Verizon Wireless Center ♦
March 24, 2011 ^{[2]}	Council Bluffs	United States	Mid-America Center
March 25, 2011 ^{[2]}	Cedar Rapids	United States	U.S. Cellular Center ♦
March 26, 2011 ^{[2]}	Saginaw	United States	Dow Event Center
March 28, 2011 ^{[2]}	Battle Creek	United States	Kellogg Arena ♦
March 30, 2011 ^{[2]}	Ottawa	Canada	Scotiabank Place
March 31, 2011 ^{[2]}	Toronto	Canada	Air Canada Centre ♦
April 2, 2011 ^{[2]}	Quebec City	Canada	Colisée Pepsi
April 4, 2011 ^{[2]}	Saint John	Canada	Harbour Station ♦
April 5, 2011 ^{[2]}	Halifax	Canada	Halifax Metro Centre
Oceania ("Music as a Weapon: Australia and New Zealand")
April 20, 2011	Perth	Australia	Burswood Dome
April 23, 2011	Adelaide	Australia	Adelaide Entertainment Centre
April 24, 2011	Melbourne	Australia	Rod Laver Arena
April 25, 2011	Sydney	Australia	Acer Arena
April 28, 2011	Newcastle	Australia	Newcastle Entertainment Centre
April 30, 2011	Brisbane	Australia	Brisbane Entertainment Centre
May 3, 2011	Auckland	New Zealand	Vector Arena
May 4, 2011	Wellington	New Zealand	TSB Bank Arena
May 6, 2011	Christchurch	New Zealand	CBS Canterbury Arena
United States
May 14, 2011	Kansas City	United States	Rockfest
May 21, 2011	Milwaukee	United States	Eagles Ballroom
May 22, 2011	Columbus	United States	Rock on the Range
Europe
June 3, 2011	Nuremberg	Germany	Rock im Park Festival
June 4, 2011	Nürburgring	Germany	Rock am Ring Festival
June 6, 2011	Warsaw	Poland	Stodoła
June 7, 2011	Vienna	Austria	Gasometer
June 9, 2011	Milan	Italy	Alcatraz
June 10, 2011	Interlaken	Switzerland	Greenfield Festival
June 12, 2011	Donington Park	England	Download Festival
North America ("Mayhem Festival")
July 9, 2011	San Bernardino	United States	San Manuel Amphitheater
July 10, 2011	Mountain View	United States	Shoreline Amphitheatre
July 12, 2011	Auburn	United States	White River Amphitheatre
July 13, 2011	Nampa	United States	Idaho Center Amphitheatre
July 15, 2011	Phoenix	United States	Ashley Furniture HomeStore Pavilion
July 16, 2011	Albuquerque	United States	Journal Pavilion
July 17, 2011	Greenwood Village	United States	Comfort Dental Amphitheatre
July 19, 2011	Maryland Heights	United States	Verizon Wireless Amphitheater
July 20, 2011	Cincinnati	United States	Riverbend Music Center
July 22, 2011	Mansfield	United States	Comcast Center
July 23, 2011	Montreal	Canada	Parc Jean-Drapeau
July 24, 2011	Hartford	United States	Comcast Theatre
July 26, 2011 ^{[3]}	Corfu	United States	Darien Lake Performing Arts Center
July 27, 2011	Holmdel	United States	PNC Bank Arts Center
July 29, 2011	Burgettstown	United States	First Niagara Pavilion
July 30, 2011	Bristow	United States	Jiffy Lube Live
July 31, 2011	Camden	United States	Susquehanna Bank Center
August 2, 2011	Virginia Beach	United States	Virginia Beach Amphitheater
August 3, 2011	Raleigh	United States	Time Warner Cable Music Pavilion
August 5, 2011	Tinley Park	United States	First Midwest Bank Amphitheatre
August 6, 2011	Clarkston	United States	DTE Energy Music Theatre
August 7, 2011	Noblesville	United States	Verizon Wireless Music Center
August 9, 2011	Oklahoma City	United States	Zoo Amphitheatre
August 10, 2011	Dallas	United States	Gexa Energy Pavilion
August 12, 2011	Atlanta	United States	Aaron's Amphitheatre at Lakewood
August 13, 2011	Tampa	United States	1-800-ASK-GARY Amphitheatre
August 14, 2011	West Palm Beach	United States	Cruzan Amphitheatre
South America
August 21, 2011	Bogotá	Colombia	Downtown Majestic
August 23, 2011	São Paulo	Brazil	Espaço Lux
August 25, 2011	Buenos Aires	Argentina	El Teatro Flores
August 27, 2011	Santiago	Chile	Teatro Caupolican

- 1 Date supporting Scorpions; non-Uproar Festival appearance.
- 2 Date featuring co-headliners Korn (Korn played last on all dates marked with a diamond (♦)).
- 3 Date part of The Edge's Summer BBQ radio event; non-Mayhem Festival appearance.

Rescheduled dates

February 10, 2011	McAllen	McAllen Convention Center	Rescheduled to March 6, 2011.
February 12, 2011	Lubbock	Fair Park Coliseum	Rescheduled to March 5, 2011.

Cancelled dates

October 15, 2010	Detroit	The Fillmore	Date canceled due to lead singer David Draiman's "severe throat condition".
October 16, 2010	Cleveland	Agora Theatre and Ballroom	Date canceled due to lead singer David Draiman's "severe throat condition".
October 18, 2010	St. Louis	The Pageant	Date canceled due to lead singer David Draiman's "severe throat condition".
October 19, 2010	Indianapolis	Murat Egyptian Room	Date canceled due to lead singer David Draiman's "severe throat condition".
October 21, 2010	Upper Darby Township	Tower Theater	Date canceled due to lead singer David Draiman's "severe throat condition".
October 22, 2010	Atlantic City, New Jersey	House of Blues	Date canceled due to lead singer David Draiman's "severe throat condition".
October 24, 2010	Boston	House of Blues	Date canceled due to lead singer David Draiman's "severe throat condition".
October 25, 2010	New York City	Roseland Ballroom	Date canceled due to lead singer David Draiman's "severe throat condition".
October 27, 2010	Wallingford	Oakdale Theatre	Date canceled due to lead singer David Draiman's "severe throat condition".
October 28, 2010	Syracuse	War Memorial at Oncenter	Date canceled due to lead singer David Draiman's "severe throat condition".
February 9, 2011	San Antonio	Illusion Theatre at Alamodome	Performance canceled due to "sudden illness"; co-headliner Korn played an extended set as a result.
June 14, 2011	Saint Petersburg	Glavclub	Date canceled due to "rising fuel and transportation costs".
June 15, 2011	Moscow	Arena Club	Date canceled due to "rising fuel and transportation costs".
June 17, 2011	Clisson	Hellfest	Date canceled due to "rising fuel and transportation costs".
June 19, 2011	Madrid	La Riviera	Date canceled due to "rising fuel and transportation costs".
June 20, 2011	Lisbon	Coliseu dos Recreios	Date canceled due to "rising fuel and transportation costs".
June 22, 2011	Barcelona	Razzmatazz	Date canceled due to "rising fuel and transportation costs".
June 25, 2011	Dessel	Graspop Metal Meeting	Date canceled due to "rising fuel and transportation costs".

== Support acts ==
- As I Lay Dying (April 20–May 6, 2011)
- Buckcherry (November 15–December 13, 2010)
- Forgiven Rival (April 23–April 30, 2011)
- Halestorm (November 15–December 13, 2010)
- In This Moment (January 14–February 8, 2011; March 5–April 5, 2011)
- Papa Roach (November 15–December 13, 2010)
- Sevendust (January 14–February 8, 2011; March 5–April 5, 2011)
- StillWell (March 5–April 5, 2011)
- These Four Walls (May 3–May 6, 2011)
- Trivium (April 20–May 6, 2011)

== Personnel ==
- David Draiman – lead vocals
- Dan Donegan – guitar
- John Moyer – bass guitar, backing vocals
- Mike Wengren – drums
