= Libido (band) =

Peruvian rock band

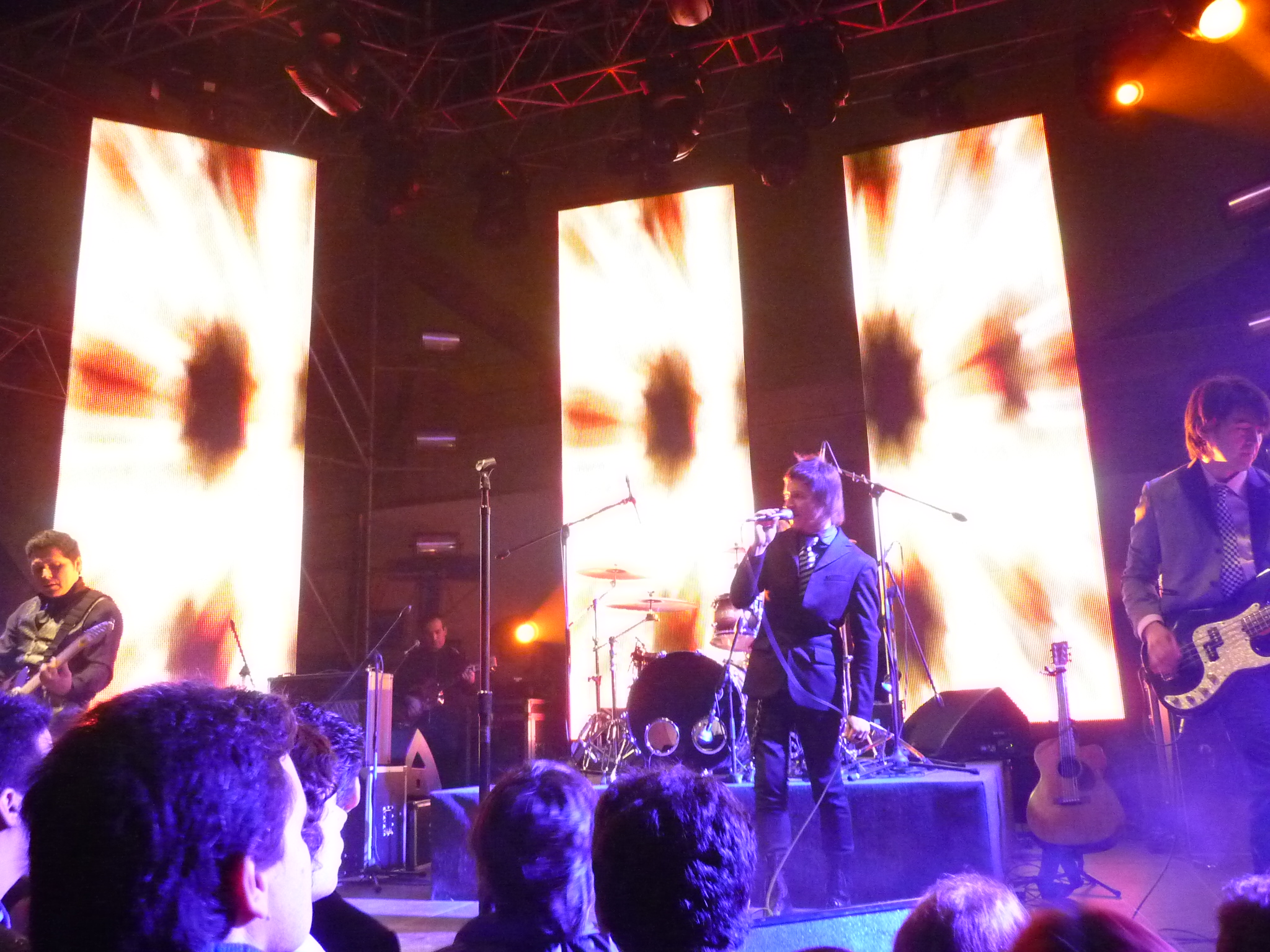
- Shoot for the promotion of Un Día Nuevo in 2009

Background information
- Origin: Lima, Peru
- Genres: Alternative rock, rock en español
- Years active: 1996–present
- Labels: LBD (independent); Sony Music, Circus Music
- Members: Salim Vera (vocals, guitars); Toño Jauregui (bass); Manolo Hidalgo (lead guitar); Jeffry Fischman (drums) (1996–2005, 2024–present)); Ivan Mindreau (drums) (2005–2009) Wilder Lopez 2009–2017 Hugo Ortiz 2018–present
- Website: http://www.libidonet.com/

Libido is a Peruvian rock band formed in 1996.

Its band members are Salim Vera (vocals, guitars), Antonio Jauregui (bass), Manolo Hidalgo (lead guitar), Jeffry Fischman (drums) (1996–2005,2014–present), Ivan Mindreau (drums) (2005–2009), Wilder Lopez (2009–2017), and Hugo Ortiz. They are winners of two Los Premios MTV Latinoamérica, in the categories of Best Artist — Southwest (2002), and Best Artist — Central (2003) and have toured all over Peru.

== History ==
=== 1996–2000: early years - Libido ===
They released their self-titled album Libido in 1998. It included hit singles like "Como un perro" and "Sed". Líbido started touring all over the country. As a result of the success of its first album, the group began to play at Peru's premier venues; meanwhile, their music began to be noticed by North American radio stations with Spanish rock programming, in specialized magazines, and on music web sites.

=== 2000–2002: Hembra ===
In 2000, the band took a break from touring to record their second album titled Hembra. It was produced by Tweety González and mixed by Doug Trantow, and was recorded in Buenos Aires and Los Angeles. This album marked the beginning of Líbido's working relationship with Sony Music, which helped reinforce its presence in the Peruvian market; the market had already been struck by a high level of piracy. With this album they achieved two #1 hits in the rankings of local radio stations with the singles 'Tres' and 'En Esta Habitación'. The music videos for the singles were directed by Juan Pablo Olivares and Picky Talarico, respectively.

After this, they took their music to places such as Buenos Aires, Argentina (Buenos Aires Hot Festival in January 2001); the United States (the South by Southwest Festival in Austin, Texas, in March 2001; the ASCAP AMPT Music Series Miami in October 2000, and headlining the Show to benefit IRC Miami Chapter in December 2001); Caracas, Venezuela (Festival Nuevas Bandas 2001); and Santiago, Chile (July 2001). During this period they received on behalf of their recording house gold and platinum albums which certified the high sales of 'Hembra' in Peru; its sales in that country were about the same as its sales throughout all the rest of the Americas.

During 2001 they continued headlining festivals in Peru: the Festival de la Cerveza in Cuzco (June 2000) and Arequipa (August 2001 and 2002); the Feria del Hogar (Lima, August 2001); and the Lima Music Fest (November 2001). Throughout this time, they continued holding concerts throughout the country.

September 2002 was a high point in the life of the group. They received a nomination in the first MTV Video Music Awards Latinoamérica and terminated their contract with Sony Music. September was also the start of the recording of their third disc in Estudios Panda (Argentina), under the production of Duane Baron and mixing engineer Thom Russo.

In October 2002, Líbido won the Best South-West Artist honor at the MTV Latin American VMAs. This was a great moment for Peruvian rock music since it marked the first international recognition received by any Peruvian rock band.

=== 2002–2005: Pop*Porn ===
In December 2002, the band released their third album Pop*Porn which repeated the success of Hembra, certified double platinum for its high sales volume in only three days on the market. Their single "Frágil" was number one for three weeks on MTV and was nominated for a MTV Video Music Award.

In March 2003, Líbido again took part in the South By Southwest Festival in Austin, Texas. This was a preamble to their first U.S. tour. The music video for 'Frágil' ('Fragile') had a strong presence on MTV Central, and had the top spot in the Top 20 for three consecutive weeks. In June, the band participated again in the Festival de la Cerveza Cuzqueña. At the start of July 2003, Pop*Porn was released in the U.S., Puerto Rico, Ecuador, and Colombia.

In October 2003, Líbido again triumphed at the second Latin American MTV Video Music Awards (VMALAs), when they won the "Best Central Artist" category for the second consecutive year. This also involved their participation in a live Pre-Show for the VMALAs, which was the first performance by a Peruvian rock band to be broadcast live to all of North America.

In the second half of 2003, the group continued traveling throughout South America with appearances in the Festival de la Cerveza Paceña in La Paz (Bolivia) and the Cabildo Rock & Pop Festival in Montevideo (Uruguay). Meanwhile, in December 2003, 'pop*porn' was published in Argentina by Alerta! Discos (owned by Zeta Bosio), and Chile.

In 2004, Líbido resumed activities with the filming of their new video for 'No Será lo Mismo Sin Ti' ('It won't be the same without you').

In December 2004, Líbido released their first live album entitled Líbido Acústica.

After a long break at the beginning of 2005, original drummer Jeffry Fischman left the band for personal reasons, and to continue his studies in the US. He was replaced by drummer Ivan Mindreau.

=== 2005–2009: Lo Último que Hable Ayer ===
By October 2005, their new album, Lo Último que Hable Ayer ('The last thing I said Yesterday'), was released. Instead of the rock sound that made Líbido famous, they chose a more experimental sound. With their first radio single "Culpable", they began their promotion for the new album. It was very controversial among fans, who claimed that it wasn't the same without Jeffry Fischman and that Líbido's music has been going downhill.

=== 2009–2010: Un Día Nuevo and Rarezas ===
After four years of hiatus, Libido returned with the studio album Un Día Nuevo, which was released on July 16, 2009. Months before the release of Un Día Nuevo, Libido had begun a publicity strategy through the mobile phone network Claro. Its two singles are Nadie Sabe lo que Vendra and Malvada.

After their Un Dia Nuevo album came out, the band decided to record another studio album. This new album would include some old songs that did not make it onto previous albums. It was released along with a DVD featuring the band's greatest hits. After the release, the band set out to tour around the country.

=== 2012–2015: Other Presentations ===
In May, the band was invited to participate in a private concert for Terra Live Music in which they presented "Cuelgo el Telefono, "El instinto del Actor", "La Info" and "Ya no me Juzgues". After this, Ivan Mindreau left the band and Wilder Lopez joined as drummer.

The same year, Antonio Jauregui, bassist and co-founder, decided to leave the band for personal reasons. There appeared to be discrepancies with the other band members about musical preferences and production. Juan Pablo del Aguila, summoned by Wilder, came along for a rehearsal. Juan Pablo then became the new bass player of the band and they established the new and current lineup. They began working on a more modern sound and started to rehearse and perform more often.

For the new year, with the new member of the group, they performed in a few festivals around Lima. On July 6, the band released an album/DVD "Sesion en vivo". This album was recorded during the first month of the year in the Casino Atlantic City, Miraflores, Lima – Peru. This new production included many re-made songs from older albums and a couple of new tunes among which was their latest "Tan Suave". This was the official presentation of the new young members of the band.

The band announced the making of a new album production. On May 23 the band participated in Festival Vivo X El Rock5.

=== 2016–2023: Amar o matar ===
The New EP is called "Amar o Matar". It contains six songs. The first song released as a single titled "Pero Aún Sigo Viéndote". They released a video clip of this single on YouTube on the third week of January.

=== 2024–present: The return of the original members ===
On January 29, 2024, Libido returned with its original members making an appearance at the Kennedy park and announced that they will play at the Estadio Nacional on July 6.

== Discography ==
=== Studio albums ===
- 1998: Libido
- 2000: Hembra
- 2002: Pop*Porn
- 2005: Lo Último que Hable Ayer
- 2009: Un Día Nuevo

=== Live albums ===
- 2004: Líbido Acústica
- 2007: Lo Ultimo que Hable Ayer en Cuzco

=== Compilation albums ===
- 2007: Bebe
- 2010: Rarezas

== Singles ==
From Líbido:

- Sed
- Como un perro
- Don
- Cicuta
- La casa de los gritos
- Ojos de ángel

From Hembra:

- En esta habitación
- Tres
- Hembra
- Néctar
- No voy a verte más
- Respirando

From Pop*Porn:

- Vampiro
- Frágil
- Invencible
- No será lo mismo sin ti

From Líbido Acústica:

- Sin rencor
- Universo

From Lo Último Que Hablé Ayer:

- Culpable (2005)
- Lonely (2006)
- Nicotina (2006)

From Un Día Nuevo

- Nadie Sabe Lo Que Vendrá (2009)
- Malvada (2009)
- Un dia Nuevo (2009)
- Sentie que hoy (2009)
- Octubre (2009)
- Amor Anestedsiado (2009)

From Rarezas
