= Lo Último que Hable Ayer =

Studio album by Líbido
- Released: 2005
- Studio: Circo Beat Studios (Buenos Aires, Argentina)
- Genre: Pop rock
- Language: Spanish
- Label: Circus Music
- Producer: Duane Baron

Líbido chronology
Pop*Porn (2003)	Lo Último que Hable Ayer (2005)	Un Día Nuevo (2009)

Singles from Lo Último que Hable Ayer
- 1. "Lonely"; 2. "Nicotina"

Lo Último que Hable Ayer (The Last Thing I Talked About Yesterday) is the fourth studio album by the rock band Libido, following the departure of original drummer Jeffry Fischman, who was replaced by Ivan Mindreau.

== Track listing ==
Original track listing
No.	Title	Writer(s)	Length
1.	"Lo último que hable ayer"	Antonio Jauregui
2.	"Nicotina"	Antonio Jauregui / Salim Vera
3.	"Lonely"	Antonio Jauregui / Salim Vera
4.	"Voy a continuar"	Antonio Jauregui
5.	"Culpable"	Antonio Jauregui
6.	"Mabel"	Manolo Hidalgo
7.	"Fantasma"	Manolo Hidalgo/Antonio Jauregui
8.	"Mas rápido"	Manolo Hidalgo
9.	"Un nuevo juego"	Antonio Jauregui / Salim Vera
10.	"El camino(Qosqo)"	Manolo Hidalgo
