= Libido (2013 film) =

- Directed by: Youssef Alimam
- Edited by: Zakareya Amer
- Release date: September 18, 2013
- Running time: 15 minutes
- Country: Egypt
- Language: Arabic

Libido is a 2013 Egyptian short film by Youssef Alimam about the premarital sex scene in Egypt. The comedic documentary sheds a playful light on the more serious issue of traditional norms that are slowly being broken down by Egyptian youth. Mazen, the main character, is a young Egyptian man trying to deal with his sexual desires. The use of cartoons along with actual actors makes the serious content more playful, and more relatable to youth groups in the Middle East. The film is available for viewing on YouTube.

== Production ==
The film was directed by Youssef Alimam and edited by Zakareya Amer. Salma Mahdi El-Kashef, Omar Abu-Doma, Ziad Tareq and Diaa Ghoneim were photography directors. The animation team consists of Nada Ali Saad, Ahmed Adel Abdelhameed, and Ahmed Emad.

== In the media ==
Although the film is only 15 minutes, Youssef Alimam and his film have attracted the attention of many people. He was interviewed and stated, "In Egypt, I think we honestly have a problem with denying the problem. Everything stems from sexual frustration, a lack of sexual education and it is widespread in the country." Because of this problem, he and his team worked to remove the stigma from something that is still considered very taboo.
