= Libido (Libido album) =

Studio album by Líbido
- Released: 1998
- Recorded: 1996–1998
- Genre: Alternative rock, Post Grunge
- Length: 39:59
- Language: Spanish
- Label: Libido Music
- Producer: Líbido

Líbido chronology
Libido (1998)	Hembra (2000)

Singles from Libido
- 1. "Sed"; 2. "Como Un Perro"; 3. "Ojos de angel" 4. "La casa de los gritos" 5. "Libido"

Libido is the first studio album by Peruvian rock band Líbido, released in 1998.

== Release ==
The launch of the album went unnoticed by the Peruvian audience at the time. However, with the launch of the singles, which sounded strong at major radio stations, the album became a success, which make known to achieving the group, began to appear in the main clubs of Lima, is as well as the group slowly gaining territory in the world of Peruvian music.

== Track listing ==
No.	Title	Writer(s)	Producer(s)	Length
1.	"Don"	Jauregui	Líbido	3:26
2.	"Cicuta"	Jauregui	Líbido	2:49
3.	"Laberinto"	Fischman	Líbido	4:40
4.	"Despierta"	Fischman	Líbido	3:40
5.	"Mal Tiempo"	Hidalgo	Líbido	3:18
6.	"Monos"	Fischman	Líbido	3:34
7.	"Como Un Perro"	Jauregui	Líbido	3:47
8.	"Viaje"	Jauregui	Líbido	2:28
9.	"Ojos de Angel"	Hidalgo, Jauregui	Líbido	2:50
10.	"Libido"	Hidalgo	Líbido	4:58
11.	"Sed"	Jauregui	Líbido	1:53
12.	"La Casa de los Gritos"	Hidalgo	Líbido	2:36

== Personnel ==
Adapted from AllMusic.

- Salim Vera – vocals
- Saúl Cornejo – engineer
- Fred Remmert – engineer
- Jeffry Fischman – percussion, bateria
- Inkeri Petrozzi – cello
- Líbido – executive producers
