= The Hall Effect (band) =

Colombian rock band

- Origin: Bogotá, Colombia
- Genres: Alternative rock, indie rock, post-britpop
- Years active: 2004–present
- Label: Independent
- Members: Oscar Correa; Juan David Bernal; Douglas Bravo; Alejandro Duque
- Past members: Luis F Charry; Jhon Quijano; Andres Rodriguez; William Suarez; Christian Gaitan; Luis Fernando Diaz
- Website: The Hall Effect

The Hall Effect is a Colombian alternative rock band that formed in Bogotá in 2004. Since 2007, they have found increasing national success, as the singles from their album Aim at me were placed in rotation in numerous national radio networks.

They also begun having a fair amount of international success, having been nominated for the 2007 MTV Video Music Awards Latinoamérica in the category "Best Independent Artist". And on July 28, 2008 were the opening act of the concert Muse in Colombia in the Palacio De Los Deportes. In 2009 and 2010 they began a European tour which took them to the United Kingdom and France.

In 2009, they teamed up with famous producer Phil Manzanera to record their new album.

== Discography ==
- Aim at me (2007)
- The Hall Effect (2010)
- ¿Y Por Que No? (2014)
