= Ángeles del Infierno =

Spanish heavy metal band

Angeles Del Infierno
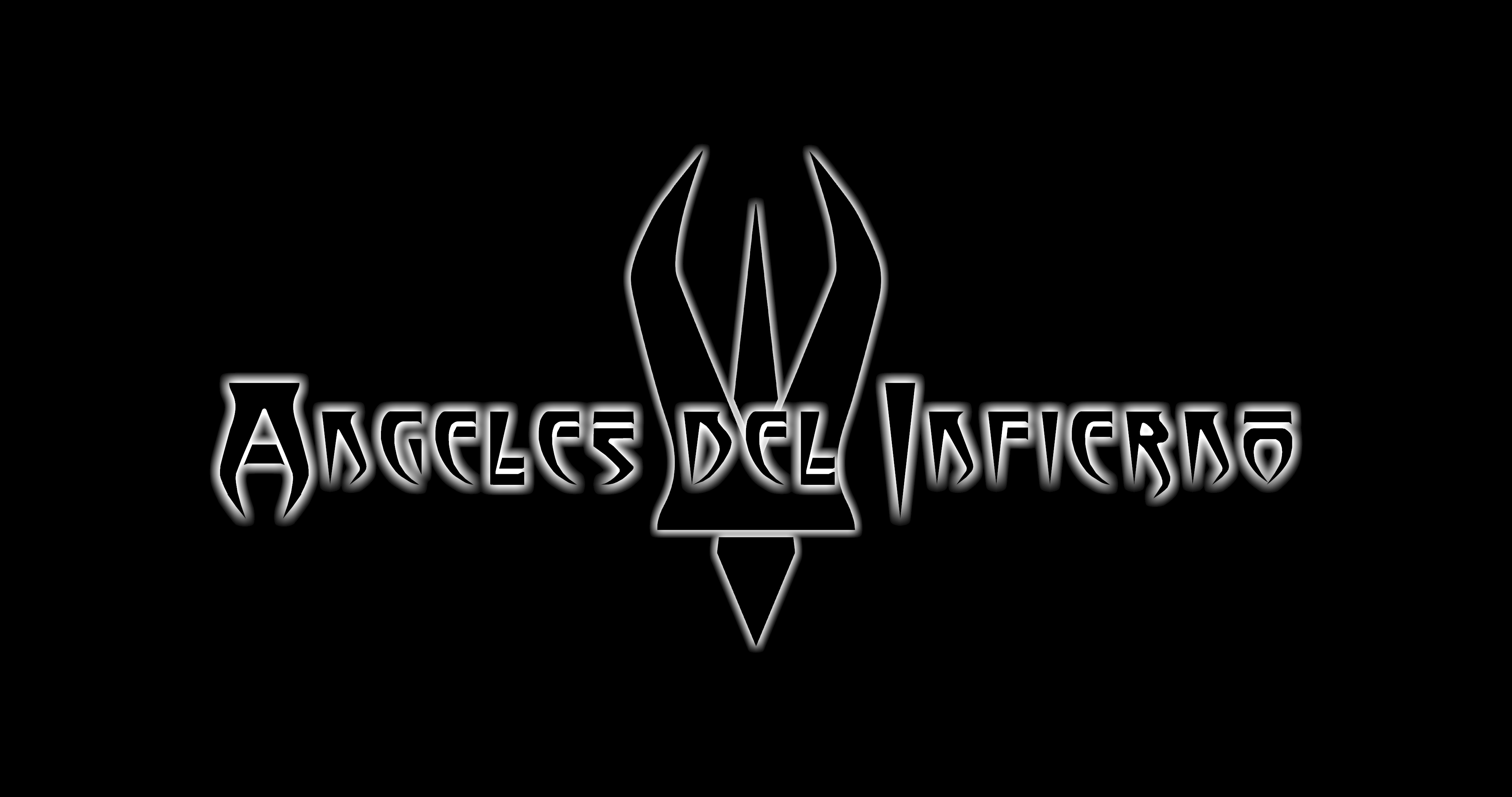

Background information
- Origin: San Sebastián, Basque Country, Spain
- Genres: Heavy metal
- Years active: 1980–present
- Labels: Warner Music
- Members: Juan Gallardo; Robert Alvarez; Foley; Alex; Eddie; Gerardo García
- Website: Official website

Angeles Del Infierno (Spanish for Angels from Hell or Hell Angels) is a heavy metal band from Basque Country, Spain, formed in 1980. Signing with Warner Bros. Records in 1984, they achieved success in their home country and Latin America during the 1980s and the early 1990s. In 2003, the band reformed and signed back onto Warner Bros. Records, releasing Todos Somos Angeles later that year.

Angeles Del Infierno was formed by Robert Alvarez and Santi Rubio in 1980 in San Sebastian with:

- Juan Gallardo: vocals
- Robert Alvarez: guitar
- Manu Garcia: guitar
- Santi Rubio: bass
- Inaki Munita: drums

Angeles del Infierno released their first album, Pacto con el Diablo (Pact with the Devil), in 1984. They immediately had success in terms of both, record sales and critical reception. They scored several hits with songs like their anthem "Maldito sea tu nombre".

== Band members ==
Current members

- Juan Gallardo – lead vocals (1980–present)
- Robert Álvarez – guitar (1980–present)
- Alfredo Colchado – guitar (2009–present), bass (2000–2008)
- Emilio Villarreal – bass (2011–present)
- Gerardo García – drums (1997–2000, 2007–present)
- Eduardo Téllez – keyboards (2011–present)

Former members

- Manu García – guitar (1980–1991)
- Guillermo Pascual – guitar (1991–1995)
- Alfonso Polo – guitar (1995–1997), bass (1997–2000)
- Ix Valieri – guitar (1997–2000)
- Gus Santana – guitar (2000–2008)
- Santi Rubio – bass (1980–1997)
- Fern Graver – bass (2009–2010)
- Iñaki Munita – drums (1980–1986)
- José Sánchez – drums (1987–1990)
- Javier Gómez – drums (1990–1993)
- Tony Montalvo – drums (1993–1995)
- Rafael Delgado – drums (1995–1997, 2000–2007)
- Deodato Montenegro - keyboards (2007–2010)

== Discography ==
- Pacto con el Diablo (1984)
- Diabolicca (1985)
- Instinto Animal (1986)
- Joven Para Morir (1986)
- Lo Mejor de Angeles del Infierno (1987)
- 666 (1988)
- A Cara o Cruz (1993)
- Lo Mejor de Angeles del Infierno: 1984-1993 (1997)
- Éxitos Diabólicos (2001)
- Discografía 1984-93 (2002)
- Todos somos Ángeles (2003)
