= El Sie7e =

- Origin: Bogotá, Colombia
- Genres: Rock; Latin Alternative; Funk
- Years active: 2001-2011
- Labels: Kallpa Records, Boto Kanela
- Members: David Herrera; Julian Orrego; Sergio Suzarte; Leonardo Uribe
- Website: Official myspace website

El Sie7e was a Colombian band.

== History ==
The El Sie7e history goes back to 2001 when four Colombians put their act together in Bogotá. In 2003, after touring Colombia and Ecuador, the band was included in the “Exhimus 2003” compilation album from Museo Nacional. Their 2004 debut album titled “Quienes Somos” (Who we are) was produced by Alex Fredjud (Sexy Death) and mixed by Dilson Dias from the Colombian rock icon band “La Pestilencia”. The single “Sin Salida” and video received air play on the South American music television network Via-X.

In 2004, El Sie7e performed for the first time in the “Rock al Parque” - the biggest open-air rock festival in Latin America, averaging 300,000 listeners. The band was nominated for best rock group and best live act in Shock magazine's music awards and for best rock video in Much music awards.

In 2005, El Sie7e associated with Pachamama Culture from music entrepreneur Mauricio Lizarazo. With this pairing, the band toured for the first time in Europe, playing in German cities, Stockholm and Scandinavian rock city Bolnäs. Between Berlin and Stockholm the band was signed by German’s independent record label Boto Kanela and filmed the video clip of their hit “No Lo Ves”.

In a fusion genre, El Sie7e collaborated with Germany's Latin Hip-Hop group Culcha Candela to record the hit single "Stayin' Alive (Quedate Vivo!)", earning a nomination for Best Featuring at the Shock Music Awards in 2006. Upon their return from Europe, their song "No Lo Ves" soared to the top spot on Colombia's primary rock radio stations, maintaining its position for four consecutive weeks.

Kallpa Records released El Sie7e’s album Punto Cero (.0) in 2007 produced by Jorge “Pyngwi” Holguin. El Sie7e continued to perform at the “Rock al Parque” open-air festival. The band’s first single of Punto Cero (.0), “No Lo Ves” was followed by “En Pie”, “Tu Engaño”, “Ileso” and "Ya No Estas" which were all hits on the rock radiostadiations.

In 2011 El Sie7e released their last Single "A New Real Love" after their longtime manager Mauricio Lizarazo announced the band had decided to separate, ending a music career of more than 10 years. The band reformed for the twentieth "Rock al Parque", in 2014.

== Awards and recognition ==
- SHOCK Music Awards Nomination with Culcha Candela (2006) "Best Featuring"
- MUCH Music Awards (2005) "Best Rock Video"
- Rolling Stone magazine (2007) 'No Lo Ves' Top 100 Best Song of the year
- Rock Al Parque Headliners (2006) Colombia

== Members ==
- Leonardo Uribe - bass
- Sergio Suzarte - guitar
- Julian Orrego - voice
- David Herrera - drums

== Discography ==
- Quienes Somos (2004)
- Punto Cero (.0) (2007)
