= Superlitio =

Columbian rock band

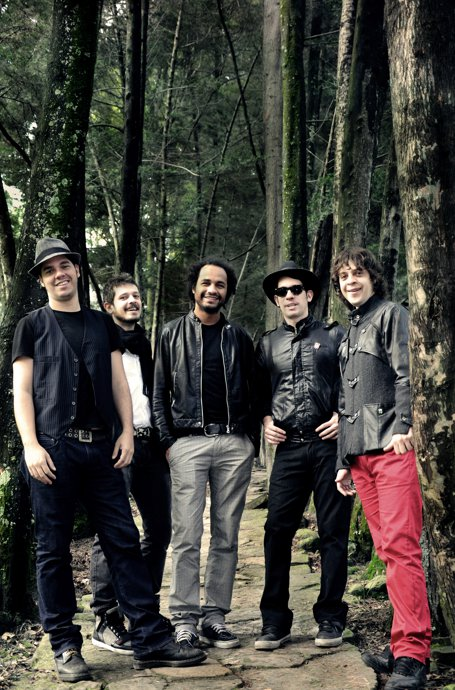
- Superlitio - Calidosound

Background information
- Origin: Cali, Valle del Cauca, Colombia
- Genres: Latin Alternative; Rock; Funk; Electronica
- Years active: 1997–present
- Label: Independent
- Members: Dino Leandro; Armando Gonzalez; Alejandro Lozano; Pedro Rovetto; Pipe Bravo
- Website: Official website

Superlitio is a Latin rock band from Cali, Colombia formed in 1997. Its members are Pedro Rovetto (bass), Pipe Bravo (Lead Voice, keyboards and guitar), Alejandro Lozano (guitar), Armando Gonzalez (drums) and Dino Leandro (Machines and Ukulele).

== History ==
The band has released independent albums, including Tripping Tropicana (produced by Tweety González) and Calidosound (produced by Rafa Sardina), and has performed at international festivals in Colombia, Latin America, the United States, and Central America.

Throughout their career Superlitio has performed with artists such as Juanes, Café Tacuba, Julieta Venegas, Control Machete, Babasónicos, Molotov, Aterciopelados and Manu Chao.

Superlitio was nominated for the Latin Grammy Award for Best New Artist in 2004. The band won the La Banda Elástica (LBE) Music Award for Best New Latin Alternative Artist, and multiple SHOCK Awards, including Recording of the Year, Band of the Year, Best Video, and Best Alternative Band. They were also nominated for Univision's Premio Lo Nuestro for Best Rock Album.

Superlitio's music incorporates Spanish, French, and English lyrics, combining elements of rock, hip-hop, drum and bass, jazz, funk, electronica, reggae, and Latin rhythms.

Superlitio's music has been featured on Colombian television series and reality shows, including Francisco el Matemático and the Colombian version of the X Factor. In 2008, the band's theme song for the Colombian film Dog Eat Dog reached number one on several Colombian radio stations.

In September 2008, Superlitio recorded their fourth album. In partnership with the newspaper El Tiempo, the band released a six-part web series documenting the production process on the entertainment website vive.in.

The band independently released Calidosound in July 2009, which was produced by Rafa Sardina. That year, they headlined the Rock al Parque festival and received the Recording of the Year award at the SHOCK Awards.

A preview of the album received over 40,000 downloads through a partnership with a Colombian newspaper, and recorded over 150,000 streams on the MSN portal during its release week.

In March 2010, right after their second appearance at SXSW Festival and a short US tour with shows in NYC, Washington, and Miami, CALIDOSOUND was digitally released on a global scale through The Orchard. "Perro Come Perro" was selected as the single of the week on iTunes Latino in the United States and Mexico, where it received over 50,000 downloads.

In 2010, the band toured Colombia to promote the single "Te Lastimé", which reached number one on several domestic radio stations and was accompanied by a stop-motion music video.

== Time line ==
- Between 1997 and 1999, Superlitio released their first two independent albums, Marciana and El Sonido Mostaza.
- In 2000 the band's music starts to appear in several playlist from independent and commercial radio stations in the United States.
- In 2001, the band completed its first tour of the United States, performing in cities including New York and Los Angeles.
- In 2004, after releasing the US debut Tripping Tropicana (CMG / Sony BMG) Superlitio received a Latin Grammy nomination in the Best New Artist category. The album was produced by the Argentine Tweety González (Soda Stereo, Gustavo Cerati, Illya Kuryaki, Fito Páez).
- Rolling Stone Latin America named Superlitio one of its "Bands to Watch" for 2005. The band was also featured on the cover of the December 2004 "People of the Year" issue of the magazine alongside Eminem, Michael Moore, and Julieta Venegas.
- Other awards and nominations for Tripping Tropicana include: La Banda Elastica award for "Best New Alternative Artist" and three Shock awards (Colombia) for "Best National Group", "Best Video of the Year" and "Best Alternative Group". Superlitio was also nominated for "Best Rock Album of The Year" for Univision's Premios lo Nuestro in 2005.
- Tripping Tropicana's first single, "Que vo’ Hacer" hit number one on several radio stations, while the video reached high rotation on major music television networks including MTVLA, MTV3S and VHUno.
- The video for "Lo Fi", directed by Colombian director Andres Mendez rotated on MTVLA, the Virgin Megastore chain in France, Much Music and other channels in Colombia and the US.
- The first track on Tripping Tropicana, entitled "Babylon" was released on the influential BMG US Latin compilation Latin Rock Explosion Volumen 2, along with tracks from Alejandra Guzmán, Gustavo Cerati, Jumbo, Julieta Venegas, Aterciopelados and more.
- Superlitio was featured in several shows from the top television and radio networks in the US, including Univision, Telemundo, Mun2 and Super Estrella. The band was also interviewed and did a live worldwide performance on CNN en Espanol
- Other press coverage has included Rolling Stone, LOFT, Newsday, Billboard, Batanga, Al Borde (cover), La Opinión, LA Daily News, Miami Herald and many more.
- In 2005 the band performed at SXSW in 2005 alongside touring the US in March/April.
- Tripping Tropicana is released in South America and Europe in 2005.
- Alongside the Colombian superstar Juanes, Superlitio performs in their hometown in front of 40,000 people in 2006.
- The band closed 2006 with a massive concert in Cali for more than 10,000 people. The show was broadcast live to an estimate of over one million viewers.
- In October 2007, Superlitio performed in front of 80,000 people as headliner at the 10th anniversary of South America's largest rock festival "Rock al Parque"
- In 2008, Superlitio recorded the lead track for Carlos Moreno's film Perro Come Perro. The song reached number one on several Colombian radio stations.

== Awards & Recognitions ==
- Latin Grammy Award Nomination (2004) "Best New Artist"
- LBE Music Awards (2004) Winner for "Best New Latin Alternative Artist"
- SHOCK Awards (2005) Winner "Band of the Year" - Winner "Best Video" - Winner "Best Alternative Band"
- Univision "Premio Lo Nuestro" Award Nomination (2005) "Best Rock Album"
- Much Músic Award Nomination (2005) Best Fusion Video
- Rolling Stone magazine (2004)Top 50 Records of the year
- Rolling Stone magazine (2005) Band of the Year
- SHOCK magazine (2005) 10 of Most Important band in Colombia Rock History
- Headlined Rock al Parque (2003, 2005, 2007, 2009)
- Named Artistic Ambassadors by the Mayor of Cali (2005)
- Honorable mention from the Governor of Valle del Cauca (2007)
- Record of the year Calidosound - SHOCK Awards (2009)
- Record of the year Calidosound, Best Fusion Band, Guitar Player of the year, Best International Band - Subterranica Awards (2010)

== Members ==
- Pedro Rovetto (Bass)
- Andres Bravo (Lead Voice, Keyboards and Guitar)
- Alejandro Lozano (Guitar)
- Dino Leandro (Machines and Ukulele)
- Armando Gonzalez (Drums)

== Discography ==
- Marciana (1997),
- El Sonido Mostaza (1999),
- Tripping Tropicana (2005),
- Calidosound (2009),
- Sesiones 10.10 (2010),
- Sultana: Manual Psicodélico del Ritmo. Vol1. (2011),
- Nocturna. (2014),
