= Koyi k utho =

Colombian industrial metal band

Koyi K Utho
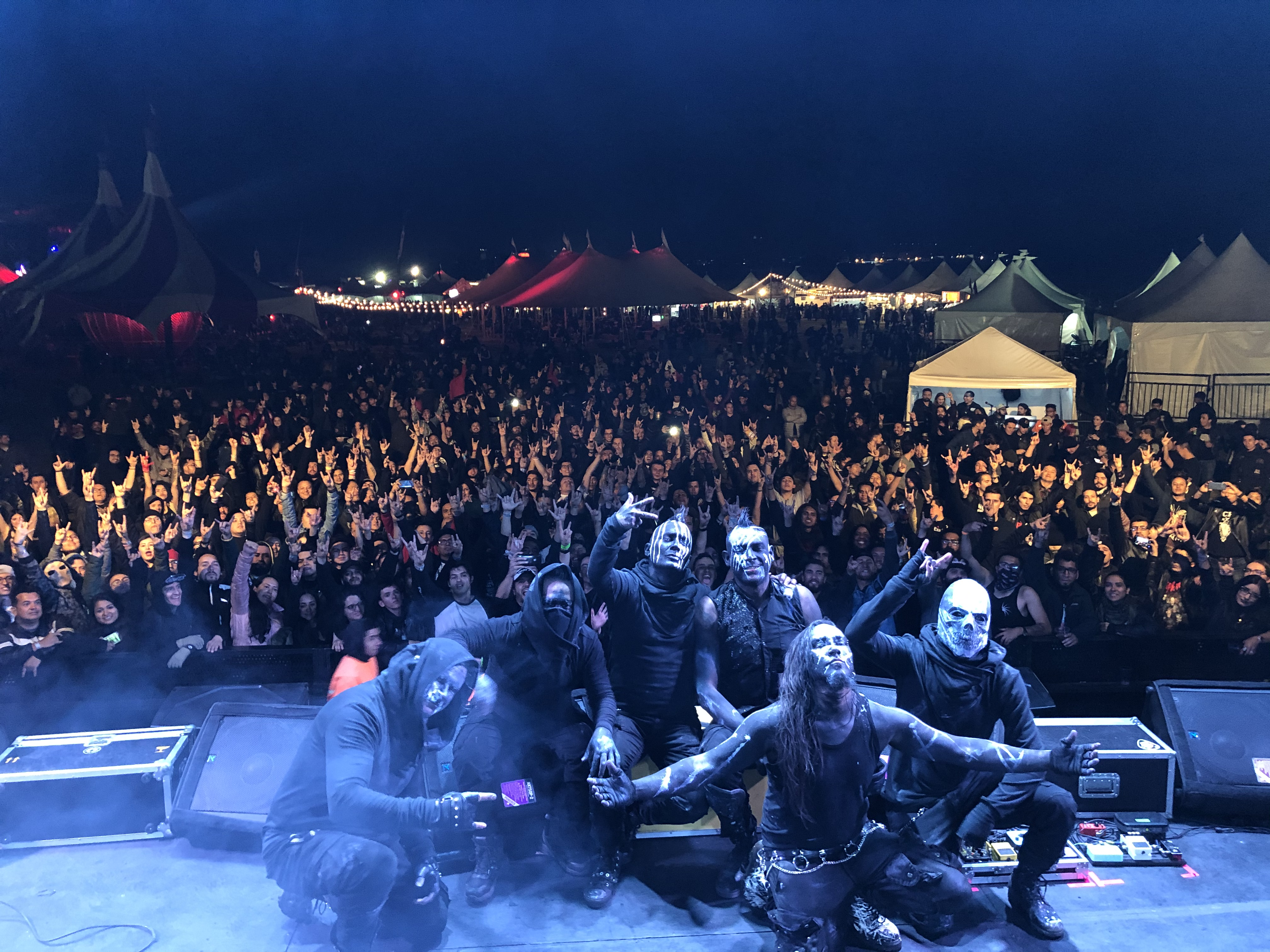
- Koyi K Utho at Knotfest 2019

Background information
- Origin: Bogotá D.C., Cundinamarca, Colombia
- Genres: Industrial metal
- Years active: 2000–present
- Members: Zetha (drums, Guik (guitar), Jhiro Cryptor AKA Jhiro Rz (vocals), Lex (bass), Mr Fuckars (synth)
- Past members: Jhiro Cryptor AKA Jhiro Rz, EDU, Jio, Cartridge, Mono, BianKo (Fabian Florido), EriK Paramo, Belltronic (Juan Calderon)
- Website: koyikutho.com

Koyi K Utho is a Colombian industrial metal band formed in 1999 in Bogotá. The band's name was selected as a tribute to Mazinger Z's character, Koyi Kabuto.

== Band name ==
The name Koyi K Utho has various meanings: The K in the middle resembles a kanji, the same used by samurai before combat to resupply energy and power. The philosophy of the band talks about the evolution of the man-machine symbiosis, but with man always in control.

The band's name was chosen as a tribute to Mazinger Z. In their concerts, and in the personal makeup of the members, a heavy manga influence can be seen.

== Musical style ==
The band is focused on all types of industrial, specifically industrial metal. They combine the energy and aggressiveness of punk, metal, industrial and electronic music. But as the band's website says: Do not confuse aggressiveness with violence.

The band's music is influenced by groups as Prong, Cubanate, Fear Factory, Front Line Assembly, Pantera, Sex Pistols, D.R.I., Static-X, and others.

== Members ==
- Zetha – drums
- Guik – guitars
- Jhiro – vocals
- Lex – bass
- Mr Fuckars – keyboards

== Discography ==
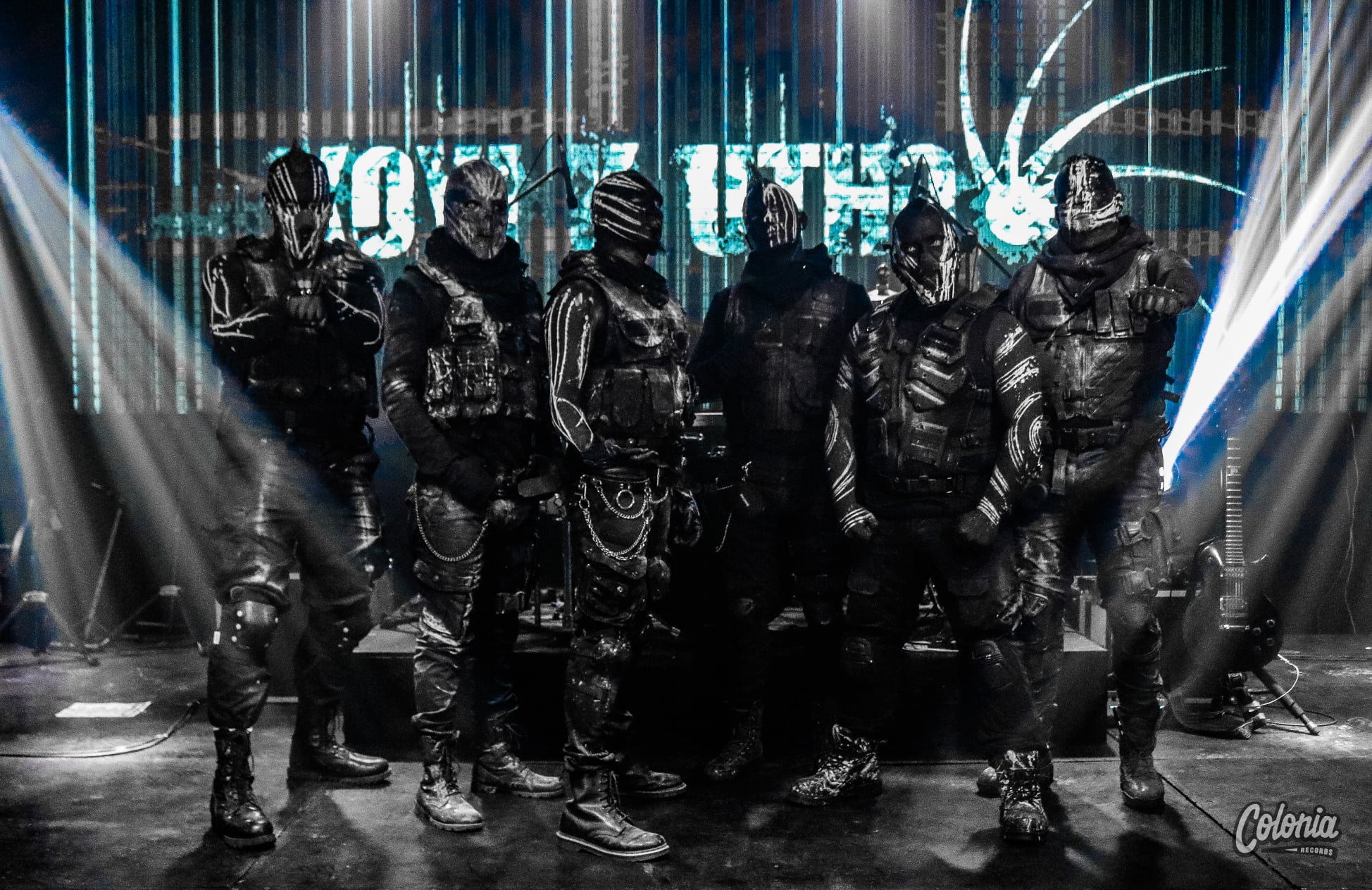
Koyi K Utho in 2021

- Evilution (2016) LP
- vio-logic (2007) LP
- Mechanical Human Prototype (2004) LP
- DC música Rock compilation (2003) (Koyi K Utho features its song Neutral Perversion Mix)
- KOYI K UTHO single (2002)
