= La Pestilencia =

Colombian hardcore punk band

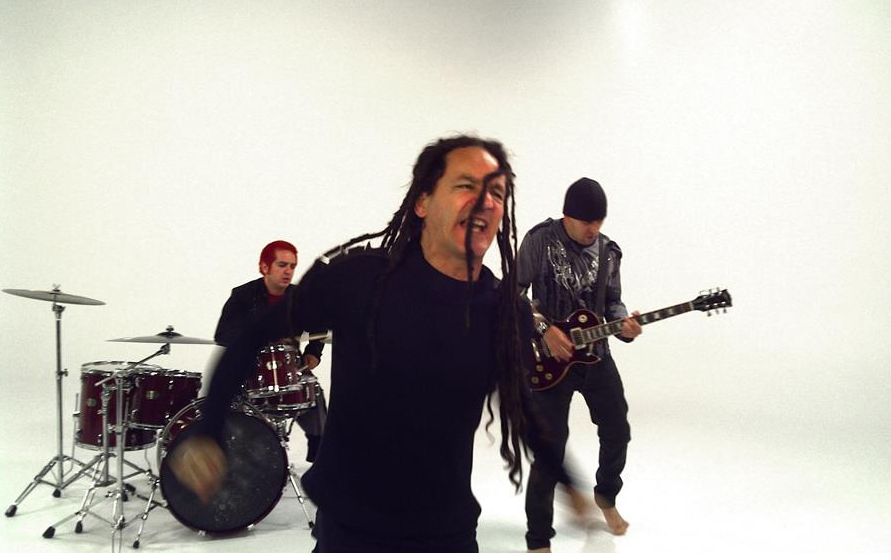
- La Pestilencia band members - In their video Descalzo y al vacio

Background information
- Also known as: La Peste
- Origin: Bogotá, Colombia
- Genres: Hardcore punk, alternative metal, punk rock, alternative rock, heavy metal
- Years active: 1986–present
- Members: Dilson Díaz; Carlos A. Marín; Isabel Valencia; Marcelo Gómez
- Past members: Héctor Buitrago; Francisco Nieto; Jorge León Pineda; Juan Carlos Gómez; Andrés Felipe Erazo; Javier Valencia; Carlos Escobar (Gambe); César Botero
- Website: www.pestilencia.com

La Pestilencia is a Colombian hardcore punk band, founded in 1986 in the capital city, Bogotá. Formed by Héctor Buitrago and Dilson Díaz, the latter being the only permanent member of the group since its inception.

== History ==
The origins of La Pestilencia can be traced back to 1986, when Héctor Buitrago was a DJ on a Bogotá radio station, playing the punk records that a relative had brought him from the UK. Dilson Díaz, a fan of the show from Medellín, contacted Buitrago to meet up in Bogotá and show Buitrago the punk records that Díaz owned, which developed into an idea to form their own group. The pair soon recruited guitarist Francisco Nieto and drummer Jorge León Piñeda, and began practicing in the house of Buitrago's mother in the working-class Bogotá barrio of Restrepo. The group's early concerts featured cover versions of Spanish and Brazilian rock bands, but they soon began to write and develop the songs that would form their debut album, La muerte... un compromiso de todos (1989). Although the band members themselves were strongly against drugs and violence, the fans at their gigs often caused chaos and damage which the band were forced to pay for, and this, plus a despondency that the album would never be noticed, caused the original line-up to split soon after the album's release. Buitrago went on to form Aterciopelados with Andrea Echeverri, while guitarist Nieto formed Neurosis and then La Derecha, both successful rock bands within Colombia. León left La Pestilencia after the recording of their second album and joined Aterciopelados for a short while, before forming his own bands Excalibur and Estrato Social.

Díaz moved back to Medellín and decided to continue La Pestilencia and recruited new members. The new line-up of La Pestilencia recorded two albums during the 1990s, Las nuevas aventuras de La Pestilencia (1993) and La Amarillista (1997). During this period Díaz was also a member of a second group, playing bass guitar for the Medellín death metal band Masacre. By the time of the latter record's release La Pestilencia had become a popular live act, and a regular fixture at Bogotá's Rock al Parque festival, the largest hard rock and metal festival in the country, and their growing popularity had generated belated interest in the group's 1989 debut album. The group ended the decade by playing to 100,000 people as the support act to Metallica in Bogotá's Simón Bolívar Park in May 1999.

Having released their first three albums on independent labels in Colombia, in 2000 La Pestilencia signed with a major label, Mercury Records, as Díaz felt it was important to spread the group's message beyond Colombia to other countries with Spanish-speaking populations. The group relocated to Los Angeles where they recorded their fourth album Balística (2001). Following another move to EMI Records, Productos Desaparecidos (2005) saw the band begin to incorporate synthesizers and other instruments into their sound, and the album was nominated for a Latin Grammy Award for Best Recording Package, as well as attaining a gold disc in their home country, the first ever gold disc for a punk or hard rock band in Colombia. In 2011 the band released their sixth album, Paranormal, and their seventh album was released in 2018.

== Members ==
Current

- Dilson Díaz - vocals
- Carlos A. Marín - guitar
- Isabel Valencia - bass
- Marcelo Gómez - drums

Former

- Héctor Buitrago - bass
- Francisco Nieto - guitar
- Jorge León Pineda - drums
- Carlos Escobar (Gambe) - guitar
- Juan Carlos Gómez - bass
- Andrés Felipe Erazo - keyboards
- Javier Valencia - VJ
- César Botero - bass

== Discography ==
Year	Title	Record label
1989	La Muerte...Un compromiso de todos	Mort-Discos
1993	Las Nuevas Aventuras	Morbida Producciones-Beatles Abbey Road
1997	El Amarillista	Lorito Records-Hit Musical
2001	Balística	Mercury - Universal
2005	Productos Desaparecidos	EMI
2011	Paranormal	EMI

== Videoclips ==
Soñar Despierto	Balistica	2001
Cordero Arrepentido	Balistica	2001
Nada Me Obliga	Productos desaparecidos	2005
Pacifista	Productos desaparecidos	2006
quí Tirado	Productos desaparecidos	2008
Descalzo Y Al Vacío	Paranormal	2012
Pesticida	Paranormal	2013

== See also ==
- Latino punk
