= Kudai discography =

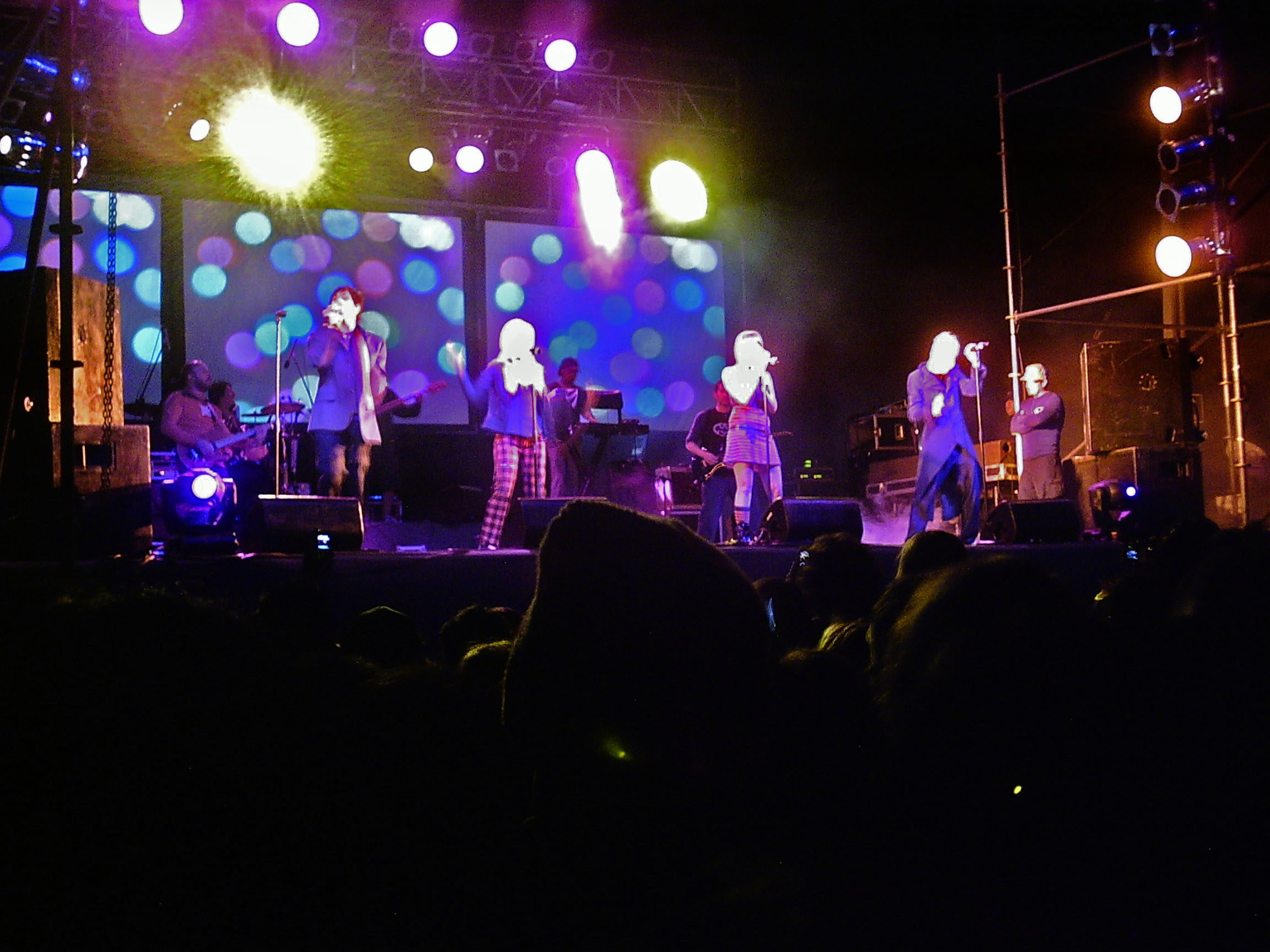
- Kudai performing on stage, in Pichilemu, Chile, on January 17, 2007.
- Studio albums: 5
- Live albums: 1
- Compilation albums: 2
- Singles: 17
- Video albums: 1

This is a list of albums and singles released by the Chilean Pop rock band Kudai, signed in a record deal with the label EMI and Capitol Records. The band's name comes from the Mapudungun word küdaw, meaning "work".

They released three albums in all latinoamerica Vuelo in 2004, Sobrevive in 2006 and Nadha in 2008, this is the first album of the band in released in United States.

The group is popular mostly among teenagers in South America, the Caribbean, Central America, and Mexico.

== Albums ==
=== Studio albums ===
List of studio albums, with selected chart positions and certifications
Title	Album details	Peak chart positions		Certifications
Title	Album details	ARG	MEX	Certifications
Vuelo	1st Studio Album; Release Date: 5 July 2004; Formats: CD, digital download	1	44	MEX: Gold
Sobrevive	2nd Studio Album; Release Date: 16 June 2006; Formats: CD, digital download	1	39	ARG: Gold
Nadha	3rd Studio Album; Release Date: 13 May 2008; Formats: CD, digital download	3	11	MEX: Gold
Laberinto	4th Studio Album; Release Date: March 15th, 2019; Formats: CD, streaming	-	-	-
Revuelo	5th Studio Album; Release Date: February 12th, 2021; Formats: streaming	-	-	-

=== Live albums ===
List of studio albums, with selected chart positions and certifications
Title	Album details	Peak chart positions
Title	Album details	MEX
En Vivo: Desde México	1st Live Album; Release Date: 2 October 2007; Formats: CD, digital download	67

=== Compilation albums ===
Title	Album details
Kudai: Éxitos	1st Compilation Album; Release Date: 24 September 2009; Formats: CD, digital download
Kudai: Grandes Éxitos	2nd Compilation Album; Release Date: 13 May 2010; Formats: CD, digital download

== Singles ==
Title	Year	Chart positions	Album
Title	Year	SPA	Album
"Sin Despertar"	2004	13	Vuelo
"Ya Nada Queda"	2004	—	Vuelo
"Escapar"	2005	—	Vuelo
"Lejos De La Ciudad"	2005	—	Vuelo
"Déjame Gritar"	2006	—	Sobrevive
"Quiero Mis Quinces"	2006	—	Sobrevive
"Llévame"	2006	19	Sobrevive
"Tal Vez"	2007	—	Sobrevive
"Tú"	2007	6	Sobrevive
"Lejos De Aquí"	2008	18	Nadha
"Estar Bien" (featuring RBD and Eiza González) (Note: Exclusive single for Mexico)	2008	—	Empezar Desde Cero (Fan Edition)
"Nada Es Igual"	2008	—	Nadha
"Hoy Quiero" (Note: Exclusive single for Chile)	2008	—	non-album singles
"Ladrando a la Luna" (Note: Promo Single)	2009	—	Bolt Original Motion Picture Soundtrack
"Morir de amor"	2009	—	Nadha
"Disfraz"	2009	—	Nadha
"Que Cante la Vida" (Artists for Chile) (Note: Charity single)	2010	—	non-album singles
"Nuestros destinos"	2010	—	non-album singles
"Aquí Estaré"	2017	—	TBA
"Piensa"	2018	—	Laberinto
"Lluvia de Fuego"	2018	—	Laberinto
"Dime Como Fue"	2018	—	Laberinto
"Sin Despertar" (2020 Version)	2020	—	Revuelo
"Ya Nada Queda" (2020 Version)	2020	—	Revuelo
Escapar (2020 Version)	2020	—	Revuelo
"—" denotes releases that did not chart or were not released in that territory.

== DVDs ==
Year	Album	Chart positions
Year	Album	CHI
2005	En Vivo - Gira 2004-2005: 1st DVD; Release Date: 13 December 2005; Formats: DVD	1
