= Supernova (disambiguation) =

A supernova is an astronomical event, a type of stellar explosion.

Supernova or Super Nova may also refer to:

== Astrophysics ==
- Type Ia supernova
- Type Ib and Ic supernovae
- Type II supernova
- Supernova impostor
- Supernova remnant
- Pair-instability supernova

== Films and television ==
- Supernova, a film production company created by Oleg Mavromati
- Supernova (2000 film), an MGM/UA science fiction film
- Supernova (2005 film), a Hallmark Channel science fiction TV movie
- Supernova (2020 film), a British romantic drama film
- 2012: Supernova, an Asylum science fiction film
- Supernova (British TV series), a BBC TV comedy series
- Supernova (Latvian TV series), a singing competition show
- Rock Star: Supernova, an American reality television series
- Super Nova, the second TV movie from the science fiction show Lexx

== Music ==
=== Festivals ===
- Supernova Sukkot Gathering, the Israeli edition of psytrance festival Universo Paralello

=== Bands ===
- Supernova (American band), a pop/punk trio
- Supernova (Chilean band), a pop band
- Supernova (South Korean band), a boy band
- Superknova, American queer pop artist

=== Albums ===
- Supernova (Alice Nine album), 2014
- Supernova (The Echoing Green album) or the title song, 2000
- Supernova (Gonzalo Rubalcaba Trio album) or the title song, 2001
- Supernova (Granrodeo album) or the title song, 2011
- Supernova (Lisa Lopes album), 2001
- Supernova (Nova Twins album), 2022
- Supernova (Ray LaMontagne album) or the title song, 2014
- Supernova (Supernova album), by the Chilean band, 1999
- Supernova (Today Is the Day album), 1993
- Super Nova (Wayne Shorter album) or the title song, 1969
- Supernova, by Erdling, 2017
- Supernova, by Exodus, 1981
- Supernova, by Caitlyn Smith, 2020
- Supernova, an EP by Lovestarrs, 2014
- Supernova, by Ralphie Choo, 2023

=== Songs ===
- "Supernova" (Aespa song), 2024
- "Supernova" (Cir.Cuz song), 2012
- "Supernova" (Liz Phair song), 1994
- "Supernova" (Mr Hudson song), 2009
- "Supernova"/"Karma", by Bump of Chicken, 2005
- "Supernova", by Ansel Elgort, 2018
- "Supernova", by Babou, 2014
- "Supernova", by The Devil Wears Prada from Space, 2015
- "Supernova", by Dragonland from Astronomy, 2006
- "Supernova", by Fear Factory from Transgression, 2005
- "Supernova", single by Shirakami Fubuki, 2024
- "Supernova", by Jonas Blue from Blue, 2018
- "Supernova", by Kylie Minogue from Disco, 2020
- "Supernova", by Oomph! from Ego, 2001
- "Supernova", by Primal Fear from Apocalypse, 2018
- "Supernova", by Raymix, 2022
- "Super Nova", by Rocksteddy from Tsubtsatagilidakeyn, 2006
- "Supernova", by Saves the Day from Saves the Day, 2013
- "Supernova", by Tungsten from Ashes, 2026
- "Supernova", by Underground Lovers from Dream It Down, 1994
- "Supernova", by Within Temptation from Resist, 2019

== Computing and computer games ==
- Supernova (computer game), a text adventure game by Scott Miller
- superNova (operating system), an operating system from ICL
- Supernova (server), a server line under development at Sun Microsystems
- Super Nova, the American name of Darius Force, a game in the Darius series
- Super Nova (video game), a TRS-80 video game by Big Five Software
- Supernova, a downloadable content pack in the Galaxy on Fire series
- Dance Dance Revolution SuperNova, a dancing simulation game by Konami released in 2006

== People ==
- Super Nova (wrestler) (born 1986), a Mexican professional wrestler
- Mike Bucci or Super Nova (born 1972), professional wrestler
- Mike Segura or Super Nova (born 1969), professional wrestler
- Jamz Supernova, stage name of British DJ Jamilla Walters

== Sport teams ==
- IPL Supernovas, a cricket team
- Omaha Supernovas, a volleyball team
- SK Super Nova, a Latvian football club

== Other uses ==
- Supernova (DC Comics), a superhero character in the DC Universe
- Supernova (Marvel Comics), a supervillain character in the Marvel Universe
- Supernova, a character in Rick and Morty
- 7712 Supernova, a new human battle machine in the Lego Exo-Force toy series
- Benelli Supernova, a pump-action shotgun by Benelli
- Dacia SupeRNova, a Romanian hatchback car
- Epiphone Supernova, a discontinued Epiphone guitar
- Novation Supernova, a synthesizer by Novation Digital Music Systems
- Super Nova Racing, a Formula 3000, GP2 and A1 motor racing team
- Hungarian Supernova or Megaminx, a dodecahedron-shaped puzzle similar to the Rubik's Cube
- Supernova, a novel by Marissa Meyer
- Supernova II, a space-based play-by-mail game
- Supernova (Star Wars: The Roleplaying Game), a 1993 adventure for Star Wars: The Roleplaying Game

== See also ==
- Supanova Expo or Supanova Pop Culture Expo, also known simply as Supanova, a fan convention focusing on science fiction and fantasy film and TV, comic books, anime, gaming and collectables
- Suprnova.org, a BitTorrent tracker
- "Oh Super Nova", a song by Harris Jayaraj and Krish from the 2010 Indian film Ayyan
