= Miss World Chile 2013 =

- Also known as: Miss Chile Project
- Genre: Talent show Reality Television; Beauty Pageant
- Presented by: Tonka Tomicic
- Judges: Angélica Castro; Luciano Bráncoli; Nicanor Bravo; Carla Marín
- Country of origin: Chile
- Original language: Spanish
- No. of seasons: 1

Production
- Production locations: Santiago, Chile
- Running time: 60 min.

Original release
- Network: Canal 13
- Release: 5 May – 18 July 2013

Miss Chile Project was a reality TV program produced and transmitted by Canal 13 in Chile and also the 39th Miss World Chile pageant. It was hosted by Tonka Tomicic. The program showed the life of twenty ladies who competed to win Miss World Chile title and compete on Miss World 2013 pageant. Camila Recabarren of La Serena crowned Camila Andrade of Concepción.

== Candidates ==
| Candidate | Age | Height | Result | Previous result | Duration |
|---|---|---|---|---|---|
| (Chile) Camila Andrade; Ex contestant of Calle 7. | 22 | 1.68 m (5 ft 6 in) | Winner of Miss Chile Project | | 13 ep. |
| (Chile) Renata Barchiesi; Medicine Student. | 23 | 1.82 m (6 ft 0 in) | 2nd Place of Miss Chile Project | | 13 ep. |
| (Chile) Romina Lancelotti; Graduated of chemical engineering. | 23 | 1.70 m (5 ft 7 in) | 3rd Place of Miss Chile Project | | 13 ep. |
| (Chile) Dahyanna Vásquez; Model. | 22 | 1.76 m (5 ft 9 in) | Eliminated Finalist of Miss Chile Project | | 13 ep. |
| (Chile) Marcia Herrera; Communication Student. | 19 | 1.75 m (5 ft 9 in) | Eliminated Finalist of Miss Chile Project | 2nd Eliminated (Note: After being eliminated on episode 2, Marcia returns in episode 9 by playoff.) of Miss Chile Project | 7 ep. |
| (Chile) Joanna Ferrari; Business Boss. | 24 | 1.71 m (5 ft 7 in) | Eliminated Finalist of Miss Chile Project | | 13 ep. |
| (Chile) Florencia Dunnage; Civil Engineering Student. | 19 | 1.74 m (5 ft 9 in) | Eliminated Finalist of Miss Chile Project | | 13 ep. |
| (Chile) Francisca Cañas; Student. | 18 | 1.68 m (5 ft 6 in) | Eliminated Finalist of Miss Chile Project | | 13 ep. |
| (Chile) Charlotte Molina; Promoter. | 18 | 1.72 m (5 ft 8 in) | 12th eliminated of Miss Chile Project | | 12 ep. |
| (Chile) Fernanda Figueroa; Fashion design Student. | 18 | 1.72 m (5 ft 8 in) | 11th eliminated of Miss Chile Project | | 12 ep. |
| (Chile) Francesca Barison; Kinesiology Student. | 19 | 1.71 m (5 ft 7 in) | 10th eliminated of Miss Chile Project | | 11 ep. |
| (Chile) Catalina Salazar; Ocupational therapy Student. | 18 | 1.68 m (5 ft 6 in) | 9th eliminated of Miss Chile Project | | 10 ep. |
| (Chile) Eileen Pérez; Nutrition Student. | 22 | 1.69 m (5 ft 7 in) | 8th eliminated of Miss Chile Project | | 8 ep. |
| (Chile) Javiera Santander; Journalism Student. | 21 | 1.68 m (5 ft 6 in) | 7th eliminated of Miss Chile Project | | 7 ep. |
| (Chile) Rocío Gómez; Publicity Student. | 20 | 1.68 m (5 ft 6 in) | 6th eliminated of Miss Chile Project | | 6 ep. |
| (Chile) Ruth Veras; Kinesiology Student. | 21 | 1.71 m (5 ft 7 in) | 5th eliminated of Miss Chile Project | | 5 ep. |
| (Chile) Constanza Maturana; Student. | 18 | 1.68 m (5 ft 6 in) | 4th eliminated of Miss Chile Project | | 4 ep. |
| (Chile) Margaret Stevenson; Public Relationer. | 22 | 1.68 m (5 ft 6 in) | 3rd eliminated of Miss Chile Project | | 3 ep. |
| (Chile) Dominique Vasseur; Model. | 20 | 1.81 m (5 ft 11 in) | 1st Eliminated of Miss Chile Project | | 1 ep. |
| (Chile) María Belén Jerez; Model and odontology student. | 22 | 1.78 m (5 ft 10 in) | Withdrew by personal motivation | | 1 ep. |

== General Results ==
| Candidate | Episode | | | | | | | | | | | | | | | |
| Candidate | 1 | 2 | 3 | 4 | 5 | 6 | 7 | 8 | Playoff | 9−10 | 11 | 12 | | Final | | |
|---|---|---|---|---|---|---|---|---|---|---|---|---|---|---|---|---|
| Camila | Nominated | Saved | Saved | Salved | Won | Won | Saved | Won | Exempt | Won | Won | Nominated | Finalist | Won | Won | Winner |
| Renata | Won | Nominated | Saved | Nominated | Saved | Won | Nominated | Nominated | Exempt | Nominated | Nominated | Nominated | Finalist | Saved | Saved | 2nd Place |
| Romina | Won | Nominated | Won | Won | Won | Nominated | Won | Won | Exempt | Won | Won | Won | Finalist | Saved | Saved | 3rd Place |
| Dahyanna | Saved | Saved | Won | Nominated | Won | Won | Nominated | Won | Exempt | Won | Won | Won | Finalist | Saved | Eliminated | |
| Marcia | Won | Eliminated | | | | | | | Returns | Saved | Nominated | Won | Finalist | Saved | Eliminated | |
| Joanna | Nominated | Won | Saved | Saved | Nominated | Saved | Saved | Won | Exempt | Nominated | Won | Won | Finalist | Saved | Eliminated | |
| Florencia | Saved | Won | Saved | Nominated | Nominated | Won | Won | Won | Exempt | Won | Saved | Won | Finalist | Eliminated | | |
| Francisca | Saved | Won | Nominated | Won | Saved | Nominated | Won | Won | Exempt | Won | Nominated | Won | Finalist | Eliminated | | |
| Charlotte | Nominated | Won | Nominated | Won | Nominated | Saved | Nominated | Nominated | Exempt | Nominated | Nominated | Nominated | Eliminated | | | |
| Fernanda | Saved | Nominated | Won | Saved | Won | Saved | Won | Nominated | Exempt | Nominated | Won | Eliminated | | | | |
| Francesca | Won | Saved | Won | Won | Saved | Nominated | Won | Saved | Exempt | Won | Eliminated | | | | | |
| Catalina | Won | Won | Saved | Won | Saved | Nominated | Nominated | Nominated | Exempt | Eliminated | | | | | | |
| Eileen | Saved | Saved | Won | Saved | Nominated | Won | Won | Eliminated | | | | | | | | |
| Javiera | Saved | Won | Nominated | Won | Won | Won | Eliminated | | Eliminated | | | | | | | |
| Rocío | Nominated | Saved | Won | Saved | Won | Eliminated | | | | | | | | | | |
| Ruth | Saved | Saved | Saved | Nominated | Eliminated | | | | Eliminated | | | | | | | |
| Constanza | Saved | Nominated | Nominated | Eliminated | | | | | | | | | | | | |
| Margaret | Won | Won | Eliminated | | | | | | Eliminated | | | | | | | |
| Dominique | Eliminated | | | | | | | | | | | | | | | |
| M.ª Belén | Withdrew | | | | | | | | | | | | | | | |

Candidate won episode’s challenge.
Candidate won episode’s challenge and earned a prize.
Candidate didn’t won episode’s challenge, but still in game, is saved.
Candidate lost episode’s challenge and is nominated.
Candidate lost episode’s challenge, is nominated and finishes at the three worst places of the episode.
Candidate lost episode’s challenge, is nominated and finishes at the three worst places of the episode, but is saved by judges.
Candidate is eliminated of the competition.
Candidate withdrew of the competition.
Candidate finishes between 4th and 8th place.
Candidate finishes as the Second Runner-up.
Candidate finishes as the First Runner-up.
Candidate won Miss Chile Project.

== Final Show ==
=== First Challenge: Talent Show ===
| Order | Candidate | Judges Score | | | | Partial Score | People's Score | Final Score | Result |
| Order | Candidate | Luciano | Angélica | Nicanor | Carla | Partial Score | People's Score | Final Score | Result |
|---|---|---|---|---|---|---|---|---|---|
| 1 | Romina Lancelotti | 5 | 9 | 6 | 8 | 28 | 8 | 36 | 4º |
| 2 | Dahyanna Vásquez | 7 | 8 | 7 | 7 | 29 | 4 | 33 | 5º |
| 3 | Camila Andrade | 6 | 8 | 7 | 9 | 30 | 10 | 40 | 1º |
| 4 | Francisca Cañas | 5 | 7 | 6 | 7 | 25 | 6 | 31 | 8º |
| 5 | Marcia Herrera | 7 | 10 | 8 | 8 | 33 | 5 | 38 | 3º |
| 6 | Joanna Ferrari | 8 | 9 | 9 | 10 | 36 | 3 | 39 | 2º |
| 7 | Renata Barchiesi | 6 | 6 | 6 | 6 | 24 | 9 | 33 | 6º |
| 8 | Florencia Dunnage | 6 | 7 | 6 | 7 | 26 | 7 | 33 | 7º |

=== Second Challenge: Interview with Judges ===
| Order | Candidate | Judges Score | | | | Parcial Score | People's Score | Final Score | Result |
| Order | Candidate | Luciano | Angélica | Nicanor | Carla | Parcial Score | People's Score | Final Score | Result |
|---|---|---|---|---|---|---|---|---|---|
| 1 | Camila Andrade | 7 | 8 | 8 | 8 | 31 | 10 | 41 | 1º |
| 2 | Joanna Ferrari | 8 | 8 | 7 | 8 | 31 | 5 | 36 | 6º |
| 3 | Marcia Herrera | 7 | 9 | 8 | 7 | 31 | 6 | 37 | 5º |
| 4 | Romina Lancelotti | 7 | 9 | 7 | 7 | 30 | 9 | 39 | 3º |
| 5 | Dahyanna Vásquez | 8 | 8 | 8 | 6 | 30 | 7 | 37 | 4º |
| 6 | Renata Barchiesi | 8 | 10 | 7 | 7 | 32 | 8 | 40 | 2º |

=== Third Challenge: Silence Cabin ===
| Order | Candidate | Judges Score | | | | Parcial Score | People's Score | Final Score | Result |
| Order | Candidate | Luciano | Angélica | Nicanor | Carla | Parcial Score | People's Score | Final Score | Result |
|---|---|---|---|---|---|---|---|---|---|
| 1 | Camila Andrade | — | — | — | — | — | — | — | 1º |
| 2 | Romina Lancelotti | — | — | — | — | — | — | — | 3º |
| 3 | Renata Barchiesi | — | — | — | — | — | — | — | 2º |

== Pageant Notes ==
- Florencia Dunnage participated in Miss Universo Chile 2013, where she became the 1st Runner-up
- Charlotte Molina participated in Miss Earth Chile 2013, where she became the 1st Runner-up. Also, Molina won Miss Supranational Chile 2014 and placed Top 20 in Miss Supranational 2014 pageant.
- María Belén Jerez was appointed as Miss Universo Chile 2015 by Luciano Marocchino, National Director of MU Chile.
