= Lejos de aquí =

Single by Kudai

from the album Nadha
- Released: April 1, 2008
- Recorded: 2007
- Genre: Pop rock · synth-pop
- Length: 4:17 (Album Version); 3:38 (Radio Version)
- Label: Capitol · EMI Latin
- Songwriter: Koko Stambuk · Kudai
- Producer: Koko Stambuk

Kudai singles chronology
"Tú" (2007)	"Lejos de aquí" (2008)	"Nada Es Igual" (2008)

Music videos
- "Lejos De Aquí" (Video Oficial) on YouTube
- "Lejos De Aquí" (Alternative Version) on YouTube

"Lejos De Aquí" is a song by Chilean pop rock band Kudai released on April 1, 2008, as the first single from their third studio album, Nadha. The song was written by Koko Stambuk and co-written by Kudai. Produced by Carlos Lara, it features racy lyrics backed with breathy vocals and uptempo beats. Lyrically, it deals with global warming and its future consequences.

Upon its released, "Lejos De Aquí" received positive critical reviews, and debuted at number third on the Mexican selling singles. Kudai performed the song live with the Mexican band Moderatto on Los Premios MTV Latinoamérica 2008 in October, 2008.

In June 2009, "Lejos de Aquí" received an award in Chile for "fostering concern for environmental issues and spreading awareness of the impacts of global warming through music".

== Composition ==
"Lejos De Aquí" was composed by Koko Stambuk and Kudai, and was recorded at Estudios 19 in Mexico City in late 2007. It was produced by Stambuk and Carlos Lara. Pablo Holman revealed that it is a theme song to make "a wake-up call so that we become aware of the natural resources that we still have at hand, but that in the future we could lose because of our unconsciousness," he said.

== Music video ==
Barbara singing in the music video.

The accompanying music video was directed by Juan Pablo Olivares, and filmed in San Pedro de Atacama, Chile. It contains a story of a protection the world of the Global warming, and was premiered on MTV Latin America on April 7, 2008, with an audience of 50 thousand people. The members of Kudai show a futuristic and minimalist style "more defined, more robotic". Pablo Holman looks like an android; Thomas Cañas was stylized in such a way he looks like a general from the future "with a stronger image, but very human"; Bárbara Sepúlveda looks her same image as always but sweeter, and Gabriela Villalba looks more feminine and stronger.

Music video is very similar to "What I've Done" by Linkin Park, explores the many ironies of humanity and its ill effects on the earth and the environment. It juxtaposes various pieces of footage: a large, well-fed man eating fast food, a woman measuring her waist and a man who is so malnourished that his ribcage is visible through his skin; African Americans being hosed down and the Ku-Klux-Klan; nuclear explosions, children waving American flags, a Middle Eastern child holding an AK-47, clips of oil tankers torn in half and birds covered in an oil slick.

A second version of the video clip was released, showing the World Trade Center towers collapsing on the 9/11 attack. A brief shot of the Indian Ocean earthquake and tsunami.

== Track listing and formats ==
- Mexican CD Single
1. "Lejos De Aquí" (Radio Version) – 3:38
2. "Lejos De Aquí" (Album Version) – 4:17
- Tecktonik Remix
1. "Lejos De Aquí" (Tecktonik Remix) – 4:13

== Charts ==
Chart (2008)	Peak position
Mexico (Ritmoson Latino)	2
Venezuela Top Latino (Record Report)	13
