= Vuelo =

Vuelo may refer to:

- Vuelo (album), an album by Kudai
- "Vuelo" (song), a song by Ricky Martin
- "Vuelo", a song by Juanes from Vida Cotidiana, 2023
