= Escapar =

Escapar may refer to:

- "Escapar", the Spanish-language version of "Escape" (Enrique Iglesias song), 2001
- "Escapar", a song by Kudai from Vuelo (album), 2004
- "Escapar", a song by La Oreja de Van Gogh from Guapa, 2006
