= Maldito amor =

Single by Supernova

Single by Supernova

from the album Supernova
- Released: 2000
- Lyricist: Koko Stambuk

Supernova singles chronology
"Toda la noche" (1999)	"Maldito amor" (2000)	"Tú y yo" (2000)

Music video
- "Maldito amor" on YouTube

"Maldito amor" (lit. "Damn Love") is a song by Chilean pop teen girl trio Supernova from their 1999 eponymous debut album.

Released as their second single, it is the trio's most played and most remembered song. It is still widely rotated. As of 2019, it had been streamed over 2 million times only on Spotify.

== Composition ==
The lyrics are by Koko Stambuk.

The song is about a love triangle. It was inspired by a real story that happened to a member of the trio, Coni Lewin: she liked a boy at school, but the boy liked her then best female friend who liked the boy in return. Coni told the story to Stambuk, and it took him 20 minutes to write the lyrics.

== Music video ==
The music video shows the three girls of the trio on a school bus dressed in school uniforms, as well as performing on a party and a sleepover with friends.

== Steffi, Trini & Kel cover ==
"Maldito amor"

Song by Steffi, Trini & Kel
- Released: 2014

Music video
- "Maldito amor" on YouTube

The song was covered by Kel Calderón, Steffi Méndez (daughter of DJ Méndez) and model Trini de la Noi as a promo for the 2014 horror movie Maldito amor they starred in. The reaction of the Supernova members to the new version was negative.
