= Miss Universo Chile 2017 =

- Date: October 19, 2017
- Presenters: TBA
- Venue: Studies of Chilevisión
- Broadcaster: Chilevisión
- Entrants: 15
- Placements: 5
- Winner: Natividad Leiva

Miss Universo Chile 2017, the 54th Miss Universo Chile pageant, was held on October 19, 2017. Catalina Cáceres crowned Natividad Leiva as her successor at the end of the event. Leiva will represent Chile at Miss Universe 2017 pageant. Valentina Schnitzer was 1st runner-up and Ingrid Aceitón was 2nd runner-up.

== Results ==
=== Placements ===
Placement	Contestant
Miss Universo Chile 2017	Natividad Leiva
1st Runner-Up	Valentina Schnitzer
2nd Runner-Up	Ingrid Aceitón
3rd Runner-Up	Sofía Hoffmann
4th Runner-Up	María José Besoain

== Delegates ==
The 15 official delegates were selected on two castings.

Name	Age	Height	Hometown
Valentina Schnitzer Lihn	27	1.80 m (5 ft 11 in)	Vitacura
Simone Mack	19	1.71 m (5 ft 7 1/2 in)	TBD
Natividad Leiva Bello	25	1.80 m (5 ft 11 in)	Santiago
Ingrid Aceitón Hormazabal	24	1.79 m (5 ft 10 1/2 in)	Puente Alto
Valentina Urrejola	TBD	TBD	TBD
Sofía Hoffmann Ulloa	TBD	TBD	Puerto Montt
Mariana Gómez	TBD	1.65 m (5 ft 5 in)	TBD
María José Besoain	TBD	1.73 m (5 ft 8 in)	TBD
Gabriela Castro	TBD	TBD	TBD
Ruth Gásquez	TBD	TBD	TBD
Karen Rojas	TBD	TBD	TBD
Camila Arnes	TBD	TBD	TBD
Rosario Ossa	TBD	TBD	TBD
Barbara Aracena Kacic	TBD	TBD	TBD
Amelia Herrera Montaldo	TBD	1.80 m (5 ft 11 in)	TBD

== Judges ==
- Marlen Olivarí
- Andrés Caniulef
- Pato Moreno

== Notes ==
- Valentina Schnitzer won the Miss Supranational Chile 2015 pageant and also participated in Reina Hispanoamericana 2017.
- Natividad Leiva won Miss Earth Chile 2015 pageant and finished as Top 8 in Miss Earth 2015. Also, she participated on Miss United Continents 2016 pageant in Guayaquil, Ecuador.
- Ingrid Aceitón was a delegate of the Miss World Chile 2012 pageant, and won the title of Miss La Florida 2017.
- Simone Mack was a finalist in Elite Model Look Chile 2014.
- Amelia Herrera was a finalist in Miss World Chile 2017.
- María José Besoain was one of the delegates of the Miss Universo Chile 2012.
