= Nadha =

Studio album by Kudai
- Released: May 13, 2008 (Latin America); August 5, 2008 (US)
- Recorded: November 2007 – March 2008
- Studio: Estudio 19 (Mexico City); Igloo Music – PALM (Los Angeles)
- Genre: Pop rock; emo pop; alternative; soft rock; dance-pop; synth-pop
- Length: 46:17 (Latin American edition); 46:03 (US edition)
- Label: EMI Latin (Latin America); Capitol (United States)
- Producer: Carlos Lara; Koko Stambuk; Gustavo Borner

Kudai chronology
En Vivo: Desde México (2007)	Nadha (2008)	Laberinto (2019)

Singles from Nadha
- 1. "Lejos De Aquí" Released: April 1, 2008; 2. "Nada Es Igual" Released: July 11, 2008; 3. "Morir De Amor" Released: February 9, 2009; 4. "Disfraz" Released: August 20, 2009

Nadha is the third studio album by Chilean pop rock band Kudai, released on May 13, 2008 through EMI Latin in Latin America, and on August 5, 2008 through Capitol Records in United States. Produced by Koko Stambuk and Carlos Lara, the album was nominated for Best Pop Album by Group or Duet at the 9th Annual Latin Grammy Awards in November 2008.

The album title means in Sanskrit "sound from the depths of the soul", which fits the emotional and sincere themes within. Most of the songs were written by Stambuk, and co-written by Kudai. Also collaborated others musicians such as Lara, Tomas "Twags" Salter, Shelly Peiken, Mónica Vélez, Kenny Aronoff and Eric Avery. Nadha is a pop rock album adorned with uptempo songs, soft ballads and alternative tracks. The lyrics deal with topics such as ecology, homosexuality, toxic relationships and depression.

Four singles were released from the album: "Lejos De Aquí", "Nada Es Igual", "Morir De Amor" and "Disfraz". A special edition of Nadha was reissued in December, 2008. It included two different versions of the song "Hoy Quiero", which was released as a promotional single.

Nadha was the last album Kudai released before they disbanded in 2010 (before they reformed years later) and it is also the last album including Gabriela Villalba's vocals.

== Background and production ==
Kudai began recording their third studio album in October 2007; the members had the conviction to compose and write songs together with the producers. Together with Koko Stambuk, who wrote the track "Tú" from the re-release of their second studio album, Sobrevive, Kudai composed several songs.

Their third studio album Nadha has 12 songs, of which six were written by the producer Koko Stambuk (ex-musician of Glup!). Three other songs are from the recognized producer Carlos Lara, who is considered to be the creator of RBD and has collaborated with musicians such as Lynda Thomas and Ricky Martin. Cathy Lean (Ex-Mal Corazón), from Chile, also wrote two of the album's songs. Nadha's production was described as much more organic, very different from her previous productions. "It's like a very neutral mix" between pop and rock.

Kudai band member Gabriella Villalba has said that this album is a turning point in Kudai's musical career:

"Now is the time that Kudai needs to show and prove many things because if we remain the same, we will be categorized as the teen band that will never grow. I feel that this third album is a very decisive stage for Kudai. We are going to fight to rid ourselves from the title of "the band that wants to be popular" and actually present good material."

Kudai chose to interpret the songs of Alanis Morissette and her band's bassist Eric Avery (ex-Jane's Addiction). The album was mastered at the Los Angeles, California studio Igloo Music under the direction of Gustavo Borner, who has worked with well-known artists such as Diego Torres, Ricky Martin, Sin Bandera, Phil Collins, Plácido Domingo and N'Sync, as well as working on the motion picture soundtracks of Rush Hour 2, Miami Vice and Finding Nemo.

== Composition ==
Nadha opens with the intro of the first track, "Lejos De Aquí", an ambient sound with TV news in the background. The uptempo pop style song deals with global warming and its future consequences. The next track is a power pop ballad titled "Nada Es Igual", with emotional lyrics about losing someone. The third song on the album, "No Te Vayas", features pulsating drums and acoustic guitars, which give it a teen pop vibe. "Abismo", as well as "Todo Peor", are both songs originally performed by Chilean rock band Mal Corazón. The former is a pop rock ballad replete with an acoustic atmosphere, while the latter contains a Texas-style guitar riff in the bridge.

Nadha's fifth track, "Disfraz", is an emo pop song that addresses the topic of homosexuality from the perspective of a person with this sexual preference. The next song, "Calendario" is a soft rock ballad in which the narrator expresses the overwhelming feelings of being away from her lover. The seventh track, "Morir De Amor", is an uptempo pop rock track influenced by dance and synthpop that narrates a toxic relationship. The soft rock power pop ballad "Abrázame" drew comparisons to the work of Mexican band RBD. The alternative rock cut, "Cicatriz", which is Kudai’s heaviest song, includes strong guitar and drum instrumentation with a powerful vocal performance by Kudai’s female members Gabriela Villalba and Barbara Sepulveda, and talks about a person's depressed state.

The album's eleventh track, "Abre Los Ojos", also drew comparisons to early RBD productions due to its lyrics. Nadha's last track, "Aquí Estoy (You're Not Alone)", is a ballad about cheering up someone who is feeling discouraged about life.

== Promotion ==
The album's title and other early information was announced in Kudai's official website in February, 2008. One month later, the band presented a preview of "Lejos De Aquí", the lead single from Nadha, on Radio Disney Latin America. The song was officially released on April 1, 2008, and its lyrics deals with global warming and its future consequences. The music video for the single, directed by Juan Pablo Olivares, entered heavy rotation across MTV Latin America, and it shows the members of Kudai with a futuristic and minimalist style. "Lejos De Aquí" received positive critical reviews, and debuted at number third on the Mexican selling singles. On April 16, Kudai performed “Lejos De Aquí” at Evento 40 at the Estadio Azteca in Mexico City.

Kudai made their first promotional tour in the United States, visiting some cities in Texas during April 2008 like Houston, McAllen, San Antonio and Dallas. On April 30, they performed at the Exa Party event in Texas. Early September 2009, Kudai filmed the video for the second single “Nada Es Igual”, a power pop ballad that reached the top ten in the charts of different countries such as Argentina, Chile, Costa Rica, Guatemala and Panama.

On October 23, 2009, a Kudai TV special premiered on Boomerang in the Boombox en Estudio music segment, directed by Diego Alvarez and produced by Aldo Ballesteros. It included a musical special filmed in Mexico City and images of the group visiting with members of the United Nations Children's Fund (UNICEF) several organizations that support adolescents and indigenous groups in Guatemala. From this TV special, the performance of “Disfraz” was taken to promote the song as Nadha's fourth single.

== Commercial performance ==
In commercial terms, Nadha was a success in Latin America. In Mexico it reached number eleven on the AMPROFON albums chart, and was certified gold for selling 40,000 copies. To August 2009, it sold 50,000 units in Mexico. In Chile it also received platinum certification for the album's high sales. Between these two territories, Nadha was preloaded on 100,000 LG phones.

== Track listing ==
Nadha – Standard edition
No.	Title	Writer(s)	Producer(s)	Length
1.	"Lejos De Aquí"	Koko Stambuk; Kudai	Koko Stambuk	4:14
2.	"Nada Es Igual"	Carlos Lara	Carlos Lara	4:20
3.	"No Te Vayas"	Stambuk; Kudai	Stambuk	4:00
4.	"Abismo"	Cathy Lean; Jorge Flores	Gustavo Borner; Lara	3:30
5.	"Disfraz"	Stambuk; Kudai	Stambuk; Lara	4:02
6.	"Calendario"	Stambuk; Kudai	Stambuk; Lara	4:08
7.	"Morir De Amor"	Stambuk; Kudai	Stambuk; Lara	3:54
8.	"Abrázame"	Lara	Lara	3:34
9.	"Cicatriz"	Stambuk; Felipe Gajardo; Elisa Montes; Kudai	Stambuk	3:08
10.	"Todo Peor"	Lean; Flores	Borner; Lara	3:46
11.	"Abre Los Ojos"	Lara	Lara	3:52
12.	"Aquí Estoy (You're Not Alone)"	Tomas "Twags" Salter; Shelly Peiken; Mónica Vélez	Borner	3:50
Total length:				46:17

Nadha – U.S. edition
No.	Title	Writer(s)	Producer(s)	Length
8.	"Cicatriz"	Stambuk; Felipe Gajardo; Elisa Montes	Stambuk	3:08
9.	"Abre Los Ojos"	Lara	Lara	3:52
10.	"Déjame Gritar"	Gustavo Pinochet; Dr. Alfa	Gustavo Pinochet	3:17
11.	"Quiero Mis Quince"	Pinochet; Dr. Alfa	Pinochet	3:26
12.	"Tú"	Stambuk	Stambuk	4:05
Total length:				46:03

Nadha – Special edition
No.	Title	Writer(s)	Producer(s)	Length
13.	"Hoy Quiero" (Versión Pop)	Daniel "Dito" Reschigna; Juan Blas Caballero	Koko Stambuk	2:51
14.	"Hoy Quiero" (Versión Rock)	Reschigna; Caballero	Stambuk	2:41
Total length:				49:15

== Personnel ==
Information is adapted from the album's liner notes.

- Kudai – lead vocals, composer
- Koko Stambuk – composer, producer, arrangements, programming
- Carlos Lara – composer, music director, executive producer
- Gustavo Borner – producer, keyboards, engineer, mixer, mastering, arrangements, programming
- Cathy Lean – composer
- Jorge Flores – composer
- Felipe Gajardo – composer
- Tomas "Tawgs" Salter – composer
- Shelly Peiken – composer
- Mónica Vélez – composer
- Gustavo Pinochet – composer
- Dr. Alfa – composer
- Daniel "Dito" Reschigna – composer
- Juan Blas Caballero – composer
- Mark Goldberg – guitars
- Facundo Monty – guitars, background vocals
- Chris Chaney – bass
- Jon Gilutin – keyboards
- Ruy Folguera – keyboards, programming
- Gary Novak – drums
- A. Thomas – background vocals
- Fernando Roldan – engineer
- Joseph "Joe" Greco – engineer
- Justin Moshkevich – engineer
- Héctor Martínez – A&R
- Angélica Pérez Allende – A&R
- Ricardo Calderón – photography
- Daniel Peralta (duoestudio.cl) – design

== Charts ==
=== Weekly charts ===
Chart (2008)	Peak position
Argentinian Albums (CAPIF)	3
Mexico Albums Top 100 (AMPROFON)	11
Venezuelan Albums Chart (Recordland)	14

=== Year-end charts ===
Chart (2008)	Position
Mexican Albums Chart (AMPROFON)	69

== Certifications and sales ==
Region	Certification	Certified units/sales
Chile (IFPI)	Platinum	
Ecuador (IFPI)	Gold	
Mexico (AMPROFON)	Gold	50,000
Summaries
Worldwide	—	200,000

== Release details ==
Country	Date	Label	Format
Chile	May 13, 2008	EMI Latin	CD
Mexico	May 13, 2008	EMI Latin	CD
Argentina	May 13, 2008	EMI Latin	CD
Colombia	May 13, 2008	EMI Latin	CD
Venezuela	May 13, 2008	EMI Latin	CD
Ecuador	May 13, 2008	EMI Latin	CD
United States	August 5, 2008	Capitol	CD
Puerto Rico	August 5, 2008	Capitol	CD
