= Bienvenidos (Chilean TV program) =

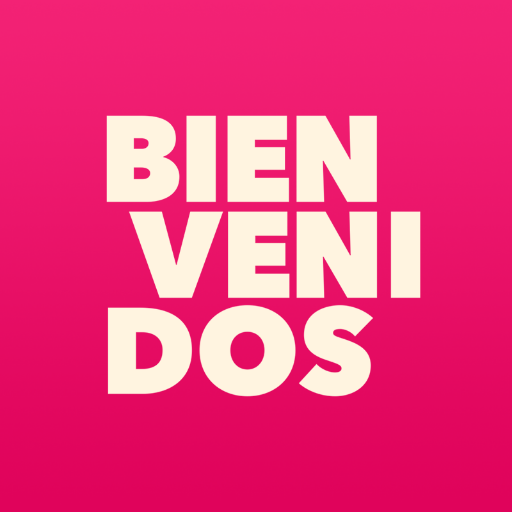
- Genre: Morning show
- Directed by: Daniel Sagüés
- Presented by: Amaro Gómez-Pablos; Tonka Tomicic
- Country of origin: Chile
- Original language: Spanish

Production
- Running time: 5 hours (7:45 - 13:00)

Original release
- Network: Canal 13
- Release: March 7, 2011 – November 10, 2021

Related
- Viva la mañana; Tu Día

Bienvenidos (English: Welcome) was a Chilean morning show broadcast on Canal 13 since March 7, 2011 to November 10, 2021. It airs every Monday to Friday at 08:00 (CLT). He was currently led by Tonka Tomicic and Amaro Gómez-Pablos.

== Team ==
=== Presenters ===
- Amaro Gómez-Pablos
- Tonka Tomicic

=== Panelists ===
- Sergio Lagos
- Raquel Argandoña
- Gonzalo Müller
- Ángeles Araya
- "Polo" Ramírez
- Carlos Zárate

=== Production ===
- Daniel Sagüés (Executive Producer and Director)
- Carla Tafall (Journalistic editor and content director)

=== Journalists ===
- Marilyn Pérez
- Martín Herrera
- Franco Lasagna
- Leo Castillo

=== Specialists ===
- Carolina Herrera (Doctor)
- Michelle Adam (Meteorologist)

== Awards and nominations ==
Year	Award	Category	Candidate	Outcome
2011	Copihue de Oro	Mejor Animador	Martín Cárcamo	Nominated
2011	Copihue de Oro	Mejor Animadora	Tonka Tomicic	Nominated
2011	Copihue de Oro	Mejor Matinal	Bienvenidos	Nominated
2012	Premios TV Grama	Mejor Matinal	Bienvenidos	Winner
2012	Copihue de Oro	Mejor Animador	Martín Cárcamo	Nominated
2012	Copihue de Oro	Mejor Animadora	Tonka Tomicic	Nominated
2012	Copihue de Oro	Mejor Matinal	Bienvenidos	Nominated
2013	Copihue de Oro	Mejor Animador	Martín Cárcamo	Nominated
2013	Copihue de Oro	Mejor Animadora	Tonka Tomicic	Winner
2013	Copihue de Oro	Mejor Matinal	Bienvenidos	Winner
2013	Premios TV Grama	Mejor Matinal	Bienvenidos	Winner
2014	Copihue de Oro	Mejor Animador	Martín Cárcamo	Nominated
2014	Copihue de Oro	Mejor Animadora	Tonka Tomicic	Nominated
2014	Copihue de Oro	Mejor Matinal	Bienvenidos	Nominated
2014	Premios Fotech Terra	Mejor Matinal	Bienvenidos	Nominated
2015	Copihue de Oro	Mejor Animador	Martín Cárcamo	Nominated
2015	Copihue de Oro	Mejor Animadora	Tonka Tomicic	Nominated
2015	Copihue de Oro	Mejor Matinal	Bienvenidos	Nominated
2016	Copihue de Oro	Mejor Animador	Martín Cárcamo	Nominated
2016	Copihue de Oro	Mejor Animadora	Tonka Tomicic	Nominated
2016	Copihue de Oro	Mejor Matinal	Bienvenidos	Nominated
2017	Copihue de Oro	Mejor Animador	Martín Cárcamo	Nominated
2017	Copihue de Oro	Mejor Animadora	Tonka Tomicic	Nominated
2017	Copihue de Oro	Mejor Matinal	Bienvenidos	Nominated
2017	Copihue de Oro	Mejor Notero	Álvaro Reyes "Nacho Pop"	Nominated
2018	Copihue de Oro	Mejor Animador	Martín Cárcamo	Nominated
2018	Copihue de Oro	Mejor Animadora	Tonka Tomicic	Nominated
2018	Copihue de Oro	Mejor Matinal	Bienvenidos	Nominated
2018	Copihue de Oro	Mejor Notero	Álvaro Reyes "Nacho Pop"	Nominated
2018	Copihue de Oro	Mejor Notera	Mariana Derderián	Nominated
2019	Copihue de Oro	Mejor Animador	Martín Cárcamo	pending
2019	Copihue de Oro	Mejor Animadora	Tonka Tomicic	pending
2019	Copihue de Oro	Mejor Matinal	Bienvenidos	pending
2019	Copihue de Oro	Mejor Notero o Panelista	Álvaro Reyes "Nacho Pop"	pending
2019	Copihue de Oro	Mejor Notero o Panelista	Mauricio Jürgensen	pending
