= No molestar! =

No Molestar!

Studio album by Kel
- Released: July 3, 2008
- Recorded: 2007–2008
- Genre: Pop, teen pop, Pop rock
- Length: 32:09
- Label: Feria Music
- Producer: Gonzalo Yáñez, Koko Stambuk

Singles from No Molestar!
- 1. "Tenerte Cerca" Released: January 2, 2008; 2. "Me Creo Punky" Released: June 3, 2008; 3. "Simplemente" Released: January 31, 2009

No Molestar! is the debut album by the Chilean actress and singer Kel. The album was released on July 3, 2008 in Chile via Feria Music Records.

The first and lead single of the album was "Tenerte Cerca".

The album was produced by the Uruguayan Gonzalo Yáñez, an ex-vocalist of No Me Acuerdo.

No Molestar! was announced during the Viña del Mar International Song Festival, but there were some setbacks that delayed the release.

== Track listing ==
1. "Me Creo Punky" (Gonzalo Yañez) – 2:43
2. "Tenerte Cerca" (Gonzalo Yañez) – 3:05
3. "Quiero Seguir" (Gonzalo Yañez) – 3:21
4. "Para Poder Tocarme" (Gonzalo Yañez) – 2:48
5. "Power Pop Electric" (Enzo Massardo, Gonzalo Yañez) – 2:41
6. "Volver a Empezar" (Gonzalo Yañez) – 3:49
7. "Te Quiero Lejos" (Leonardo Saavedra) – 2:34
8. "Simplemente" (Koko Stambuk) – 2:54
9. "Detesto" (Mariel Villagra, Martina Lecaros) – 3:18
10. "Silencio" (Pablo Holman) – 4:14

== Singles ==
Year	Title
2008	"Tenerte Cerca"
2008	"Me Creo Punky"
2009	"Simplemente"
