= Mourir d'amour =

Mourir d'amour

- Mourir d'amour (Ma mort a les yeux bleus) 1960 Mireille Darc José Bénazéraf
- "Mourir d'amour", song by Frédéric François from 20 Ans D'olympia 2008

== See also ==
- Mourir d'aimer
- Morir de amor (disambiguation)
