= Camila Andrade =

Chilean TV host, model, and beauty pageant titleholder

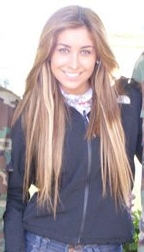
- Born: Camila Andrea Andrade Mora; 2 January 1991 (age 34–35); Concepción, Chile
- Occupation: TV Host,
- Height: 5 ft 6.5 in (1.69 m)
- Beauty pageant titleholder
- Title: Miss World Chile 2013
- Hair color: Light Brown
- Eye color: Brown
- Major competitions: Miss World Chile 2013; (Winner); Miss World 2013; (Unplaced); Participante De Gran Hermano Chile 2024

Camila Andrade Mora (born 2 January 1991) is a Chilean TV host, model and beauty pageant titleholder who won the 2013 Miss World Chile contest.

== Miss World 2013 ==
She was chosen on July 18, 2013, under the organization of Miss Chile. Andrade represented Chile in Miss World 2013, in Indonesia, in September 2013. She was unplaced, but represented Rapa Nui's folk dance at "Dances of the World" segment. In the preliminaries, she placed Top 33 in the Beach Fashion challenge. Currently she works on Chilean TV channel La Red

== Reality shows ==
Año	Título	Canal	Notas
2010	Calle7 Cuarta Temporada	TVN	Competidora / 16°Eliminada
2010	Calle7 Quinta Temporada	TVN	Competidora / 6°Eliminada
2011	AÑO 0	Canal 13	Competidora
2011	Calle7 Séptima Temporada	TVN	Competidora / 6°Eliminada
2012	Yingo	CHV	Concursante
2012	Calle7 Undécima Temporada	TVN	Competidora / 15°Eliminada
2013	Calle7 Duodécima Temporada	TVN	Competidora / Abandona
2013	Proyecto Miss Chile	Canal13	Ganadora 🥇
2014	Intrusos	La Red	Panelista
2015	Escuela de Maridos	CHV	Coanimadora
2015-2016	Primer Plano	CHV	Panelista
2015-2016	SQP	CHV	Panelista
2016-2019	Así Somos	La Red	Panelista/Animadora
2019	Intrusos	La Red	Panelista
2020	Tu Casa Club en la Red	La Red	Conductora
2023	Caja de Pandora	La Red	Conductora
2024	Gran Hermano 2	Chilevisión	Participante
2025	Fiebre de Baile 6	Chilevisión	Participante/ 5° Lugar

Awards and achievements
Preceded by Camila Recabarren	Miss World Chile; 2013	Succeeded by Fernanda Sobarzo
