= En Vivo: Desde México =

Live album by Kudai
- Released: October 2, 2007
- Recorded: 2007
- Genre: Pop; pop rock
- Length: 53:04
- Label: EMI
- Producer: Koko Stambuk; Cathy Lean; Carlos Lara

Kudai chronology
Sobrevive (2006)	En Vivo: Desde México (2007)	Nadha (2008)

En Vivo: Desde México is the first live album (third overall) of the Chilean pop rock band Kudai. It was released on October 2, 2007.

== Track listing ==
1. "Intro"
2. "No Quiero Regresar"
3. "Vuelo"
4. "Tal Vez"
5. "Okay"
6. "Lejos De La Ciudad"
7. "Tú"
8. "Ya Nada Queda"
9. "Quiero Mis Quinces"
10. "Llévame"
11. "Escapar"
12. "Sin Despertar"
13. "Déjame Gritar"
