= Miss Universo Chile 2013 =

- Date: October 6th, 2013
- Presenters: Savka Pollak, Miss Universe Chile 1993
- Entertainment: Simoney
- Venue: Gran Ballroom Salon, Ritz Carlton, Santiago de Chile
- Entrants: 15
- Winner: María Jesús Matthei; Tarapacá

Miss Universo Chile 2013, the 50th Miss Universo Chile pageant, was held on October 6, 2013. The winner, María Jesús Matthei, represented her country in Miss Universe 2013 in Moscow, Russia on November 9, 2013.

== Results ==
=== Placements ===
Placements	Contestant
Miss Universo Chile 2013	Tarapacá – María Jesús Matthei
1st Runner-Up	Coquimbo – Florencia Dunnage
2nd Runner-Up	Aysen – María José Barrena
Top 8	Antofagasta – Valeska Farías; Arica y Parinacota – Amapola Stuardo; Bio Bio – Joseffha Katz; Los Lagos – Catalina Baumann; Valparaíso – Catalina Zamora

=== Special awards ===
- Miss Rostro 2013 – Carla Valenzuela Donoso (Araucanía)
- Miss Congeniality – María Jesús Matthei (Tarapacá)
- Best Hair 2013 – Florencia Dunnage (Coquimbo)
- Miss Chileancharm – María Jesús Matthei (Tarapacá)

== Delegates ==
The 15 Official Delegates were presented on October 2, 2013.

Represents	Name	Age	Height	Hometown
Antofagasta	Valeska María Farías Martes	24	1.77 m (5 ft 9 1/2 in)	Santiago de Chile
Araucanía	Carla Andrea Valenzuela Donoso	23	1.75 m (5 ft 9 in)	Temuco
Arica y Parinacota	Amapola Stuardo Muñóz	19	1.78 m (5 ft 10 in)	Arica
Atacama	Chloé Quezada Carranza	25	1.85 m (6 ft 1 in)	Santiago de Chile
Aysen	María José Barrena Medel	27	1.73 m (5 ft 8 in)	Santiago de Chile
Bío Bío	Joseffha Esteffhania Katz Rodríguez	23	1.76 m (5 ft 9 1/2 in)	Concepción
Coquimbo	Florencia Dunnage Kuhlmann	20	1.73 m (5 ft 8 in)	La Serena
Los Lagos	Catalina Baumann Zamora	20	1.72 m (5 ft 7 1/2 in)	Temuco
Los Ríos	Francisca Araya Villagran	25	1.81 m (5 ft 11 1/2 in)	Santiago de Chile
Magallanes y la Antártica Chilena	Claudia Betancourt Greff-Ovalle	24	1.74 m (5 ft 8 1/2 in)	Punta Arenas
Maule	Consuelo Margarita Lastra Espaillat	20	1.79 m (5 ft 10 1/2 in)	Concepción
O'Higgins	Alessandra Buonaventura de la Peña	18	1.72 m (5 ft 7 1/2 in)	Rancagua
Región Metropolitana	Catalina Bunster de los Santos	20	1.83 m (6 ft 0 in)	Santiago de Chile
Tarapacá	María Jesús Matthei Molina	21	1.80 m (5 ft 11 in)	Santiago de Chile
Valparaíso	Catalina Zamora Fonck	25	1.75 m (5 ft 9 in)	Viña del Mar

== Jury ==
- Nicolás Massú, Tennis Player
- Antonio Vodanovic, TV Presenter
- Mauro Porcia, Cosmetic Surgeon
- Marie Ann Salas, Miss International Chile 2007 (Semifinalist) / Miss Tourism Queen International Chile 2008 (Finalist)
- Beatriz Vicencio
- José Alfredo Fuentes, TV Presenter / Singer
- Marcelo Marocchino, Singer
- Gianella Marengo, TV Presenter
- Tiago Cunha

== Notes ==
- The pageant was organized by Luciano Marrochino, Juan Andrés Sastre from Kreatore and Jorge Luis Uribe.
- María Jesús Matthei participated for the first time in 2011, where she became the 1st Runner-up.
- Florencia Dunnage participated in Miss World Chile 2013, where she was one of the 8 finalists.
- María Jose Barrena, participated in Reina Hispanoamericana 2013, where she became the 2nd Runner-up.
