= Miss Universo Chile 2012 =

- Date: October 26th, 2012
- Presenters: Carolina de Moras, Martín Cárcamo
- Venue: Enjoy Santiago, Casino & Resort, Santiago de Chile
- Entrants: 13
- Winner: Ana Luisa König

Miss Universo Chile 2012, the 49th Miss Universo Chile pageant, held at the Enjoy Santiago, Casino & Resort on October 26, 2012. The winner, Ana Luisa König from O'Higgins, represented her country in Miss Universe 2012 in Las Vegas, Nevada, United States on December 19, 2012.

== Final results ==
Final results	Contestant
Miss Universo Chile 2012	O'Higgins - Ana Luisa König
1st Runner-up	Maule - Javiera Santander
2nd Runner-up	Valparaíso - Rebeca Barros
Semifinalists	Araucanía - Fernanda Luchsinger; Islas Juan Fernández - María Mihovilovic

=== Special awards ===
- Miss Congeniality - Emilia Depassier (Bío Bío)

== Delegates ==
Represents	Name	Age	Height	Hometown
Antofagasta	Javiera Franco	27	1.72 m (5 ft 7 1/2 in)	Santiago
Araucanía	Fernanda Luchsinger	18	1.70 m (5 ft 7 in)	Temuco
Atacama	Carla Abarca	25	1.70 m (5 ft 7 in)	Vallenar
Bío Bío	Emilia Depassier	22	1.79 m (5 ft 10 1/2 in)	Santiago
Ciudad Capital	María José Muñoz	19	1.73 m (5 ft 8 in)	Santiago
Coquimbo	Camila Silva	19	1.79 m (5 ft 10 1/2 in)	Coquimbo
Islas Juan Fernández	María Ignacia Mihovilovic	19	1.79 m (5 ft 10 1/2 in)	Santiago
Los Lagos	Valeria Yohonson	18	1.75 m (5 ft 9 in)	Santiago
Maule	Javiera Santander	20	1.71 m (5 ft 7 1/2 in)	Santiago
O'Higgins	Ana Luisa König	21	1.77 m (5 ft 9 1/2 in)	Santiago
Región Metropolitana	Nicole Lavanchy	22	1.83 m (6 ft 0 in)	Santiago
Tarapacá	Gabriela Ahumada	20	1.78 m (5 ft 10 in)	Santiago
Valparaíso	Rebeca Barros	18	1.74 m (5 ft 8 1/2 in)	Santiago

== Jury ==
- Vanessa Ceruti, Miss Universo Chile 2011
- Raquel Argandoña, TV Presenter & Miss Universo Chile 1975
- Juan Falcón, Actor
- Carolina Parsons, Model
- Carolina Ruiz, Model
- Gabriel Schkolnick, Photographer
- Luis Francisco Dotto, Founder of Dotto Agency
- Majed Kahlil, President of Sun Channel TV

== Notes ==
- The pageant is being organized by Luciano Marrochino, Enjoy Casino & Resort and Camilo Valdivia.
- Sara Bravo and Daniela Llanos withdrew of the competition.
