= Fernanda Sobarzo =

Chilean model

- Born: Fernanda Andrea Sobarzo Aguilera; Peñalolén, Santiago, Chile
- Occupations: Model, student

Fernanda Andrea Sobarzo Aguilera is a Chilean model and beauty pageant titleholder who won Miss World Chile 2015 and represented Chile at Miss World 2015 pageant.

== Pageantry ==
=== Miss Mundo Chile 2015 ===
Fernanda, an engineering student in Diego Portales University, was crowned by Camila Andrade as Miss World Chile in a private event held in the Chilean Telethon Theatre. Sobarzo won Miss Elegance, Miss Photogenic and Miss Beauty with a Purpose award. Also she placed Top 6 in Sports and Fitness challenge and Top 5 in Miss Multimedia.

=== Miss World 2015 ===
As Miss Mundo Chile, Sobarzo represented Chile in Miss World 2015 pageant, held in Sanya, China on December 19.

Awards and achievements
Preceded by Camila Andrade	Miss World Chile; 2015	Succeeded by Antonia Cristal Figueroa Alvarado
