= Karkú =

- Genre: Teen drama; Telenovela; Romance
- Created by: Onell López Campos; José Francisco García
- Written by: Onell López Campos
- Directed by: Onell López Campos; Juan Pablo Tapia
- Starring: Constanza Piccoli; Ignacio Sepúlveda; Raquel Calderón; César Morales; Luciana Echeverría; Vicente Muñoz; Constanza Herrero; Nicolas Guerra
- Opening theme: "Cada Vez" by Six Pack (seasons 1–2); Huracanes by Six Pack (season 3)
- Country of origin: Chile
- Original language: Spanish
- No. of seasons: 3
- No. of episodes: 76

Production
- Executive producer: José Francisco García
- Producers: Felipe Vergara; Soledad Pérez
- Running time: 26 minutes

Original release
- Network: Televisión Nacional de Chile (seasons 1–2); Nickelodeon Latin America (season 3)
- Release: February 5, 2007 – July 22, 2009

Karkú is a Chilean teen telenovela television series, co-produced by My Friend Entertainment and Televisión Nacional de Chile (TVN).

== Plot ==
Emilia, a 13-year-old girl, is sent by her parents from the small city of Vallenar, Chile, to live with her uncles in metropolitan Santiago, Chile. There, she enters the British College, where she befriends Fernanda, Valentina, Zico, Alex, and Martín, with whom she tries to fund a year-end trip overseas. The series follows exploring everyday-life problems of teenagers, including friendship and romance.

== Cast ==
Main cast

- Constanza Piccoli as Emilia "Emi" Valdés
- Ignacio Sepúlveda as Francisco "Zico" Sotomayor
- Raquel Calderón as Fernanda "Feña" Urquieta
- Cesar Morales as Martín Maldonado
- Luciana Echeverría como Valentina "Vale" Urquieta
- Vicente Muñoz como Alex Schilling
- Constanza Herrero como Daniela "Dana" Hamilton (season 3 only)
- Nicolás Guerra como Cristian "Chris" Hamilton (season 3 only)

Supporting cast

- Gustavo Becerra as Inspector Palacios
- Marcos Bucci as Marcos "Chanchivia" Valdivia
- Patricia Irribarra as Miss Elena
- Renato Münster as Uncle Arturo
- Vania Alejandra López as Margarita
- Peggy Cordero as Edna, Dana and Chris's grandmother
- Carlos Embry as Manuel Valdés, Emilia's father
- Araceli Vitta as Miss Fabiana Castillo
- Paulina Hunt as Nurse María Eugenia
- Javiera Hernández as Miss Daniela
- Paula Sharim as Uncle Mariana
- Daniel Herrera as Lucas
- Francisca Reiss as Patricia, Emilia's mother
- Rodrigo Leon as Diego, Fernanda's friend

== Production and themes ==
The first Latin American telenovela for young audience, Karkú was co-produced My Friend Entertainment and Televisión Nacional de Chile (TVN). Its title is derived from mapudungún and means "to dare," which "faithfully reflects the spirit of the plot," according to TVN. The series was created Onell López Campos and José Francisco García, with Campos as director along with Juan Pablo Tapia, and García as executive producer, and Felipe Vergara and Soledad Pérez as producers. It explores the aging of teenagers, focusing on Latin America, and producers tried to prompt diligence, teamwork, and friendship on its viewers. López commented he tried to insert music as feature that "not only plays as an ornament, but is part of the undertaking of the protagonists, is a tool that they have."

== Broadcasting ==
The first two seasons were broadcast by TVN in Chile; from February 5, to March 8, 2007, and from January 2, to February 6, 2008. The third season was first broadcast on Nickelodeon Latin America between June 17, and July 22, 2009. It aired in the other Latin American countries through Nickelodeon, with Ecuavisa also airing it in Ecuador, Señal Colombia in Colombia, and TV Brasil in Brazil. Spanish-language network ¡Sorpresa! broadcast the series on its back to school programming in the United States.

== Reception ==
It was a success in Chile; its debuted had a 14.4 rating against 11.7 and 6.7 of Mekano and Futurama respectively. The complete first season had an average rating of 14.1. It was also popular in several countries of Latin America.
