= Supernova (Supernova album) =

Studio album by Supernova
- Released: 1999
- Genre: Pop
- Label: BMG Chile
- Producer: Cristian Heyne; Koko Stambuk

Supernova chronology
Supernova (1999)	Retráctate (2002)

Singles from Supernova
- 1. "Toda la noche" Released: 1999; 2. "Maldito amor" Released: 2000; 3. "Tú y yo" Released: 2000; 4. "Sin ti soy un fantasma" Released: 2001

Supernova is the 1999 debut album by the Chilean pop teen trio Supernova, at the time consisting of Constanza "Coni" Lewin, Elisa Montes and Consuelo "Chi-K" Edwards.

The album sold over 40,000 copies. It was certified Gold (for sales of over 15,000 units) and then Platinum (for sales of over 25,000 units).

In 2019, CNN Chile published a track by track analysis of the album. According to the media outlet, by that time the album had been certified Double Platinum.

== Track listing ==
No.	Title	Length
1.	"Toda la noche"	3:44
2.	"Tú y yo"	3:59
3.	"Sin ti soy un fantasma"	4:02
4.	"Deja que el mundo de vueltas"	3:25
5.	"Discogroovy"	3:58
6.	"Maldito amor"	3:38
7.	"Mi amor no se compra"	3:23
8.	"Gisselle"	3:56
9.	"Navidad mentira"	3:51
10.	"Pide un deseo"	4:39
