= Miss Universo Chile 2011 =

- Date: July 13, 2011
- Presenters: Tonka Tomicic and Jordi Castell
- Venue: Enjoy Santiago, Casino & Resort, Santiago de Chile
- Entrants: 14
- Winner: Vanessa Ceruti; Magallanes y Antártica Chilena

Miss Universo Chile 2011, the 48th Miss Universe Chile pageant, was the return of Chile to the Miss Universe pageant after 4 years of absence. The winner, Vanessa Ceruti, was crowned at the Enjoy Santiago, Casino & Resort on July 13, 2011, and she represented her country in Miss Universe 2011 in São Paulo, Brazil on September 12, 2011.

== Results ==
=== Placements ===
Placement	Contestant
Miss Universo Chile 2011	Magallanes y Antártica Chilena – Vanessa Ceruti
1st Runner-Up	Aysén – María Jesús Matthei
2nd Runner-Up	Tarapacá – Sofía Izquierdo
Top 5	Maule – Francisca Balduzzi; Coquimbo – Emilia Daiber

=== Special awards ===
- Modelo Revelación - Vanessa Cerutti (Magallanes y Antártica Chilena)
- Rostro Juvenil - María Jesús Matthei (Aysén)

== Delegates ==
Represents	Name	Age	Height	Hometown
Antofagasta	Carmen Luz Zabala	21	1.78	Santiago
Araucanía	Gabriela Gatica	19	1.83	Temuco
Atacama	Paula Romero	22	1.74	Santiago
Aysén	María Jesús Matthei	19	1.80	Santiago
Bío Bío	Alejandra Martínez	25	1.77	Santiago
Ciudad Capital	Caterina Araya	25	1.78	Santiago
Coquimbo	Emilia Daiber	21	1.73	Santiago
Los Lagos	Luz María Redlich	25	1.77	Puerto Varas
Magallanes y Antártica Chilena	Vanessa Ceruti	25	1.78	Santiago
Maule	Francisca Balduzzi	21	1.75	Talca
O'Higgins	Belén Sandoval	23	1.75	Santiago
Región Metropolitana	Ana María Guzmán	27	1.74	Santiago
Tarapacá	Sofía Izquierdo	20	1.80	Santiago
Valparaíso	Sofía Saavedra	21	1.73	Viña del Mar

== Jury ==
- Ximena Navarrete, Miss Universe 2010
- Ana María Cummins, Director Foundation Alter Ego
- Rubén Campos, Fashion Designer
- Renata Ruiz, Miss Universo Chile 2005
- Carolina De Moras, TV Presenter, Model
- Alvaro Rudolphy, Actor
- Eva Gómez, TV Presenter
- Vanessa Miller, Actress
- Pedro Frugone, Musician
- José Zarhi, Plastic Surgeon
- Dario Sepe

== Notes ==
- The pageant was organized by Luciano Marrochino, Enjoy Casino & Resort and Camilo Valdivia.
- María Jesús Matthei, the 1st Runner-up of the contest, participated again in 2013, winning the competition and representing Chile in Miss Universe 2013.
