= Constanza Herrero =

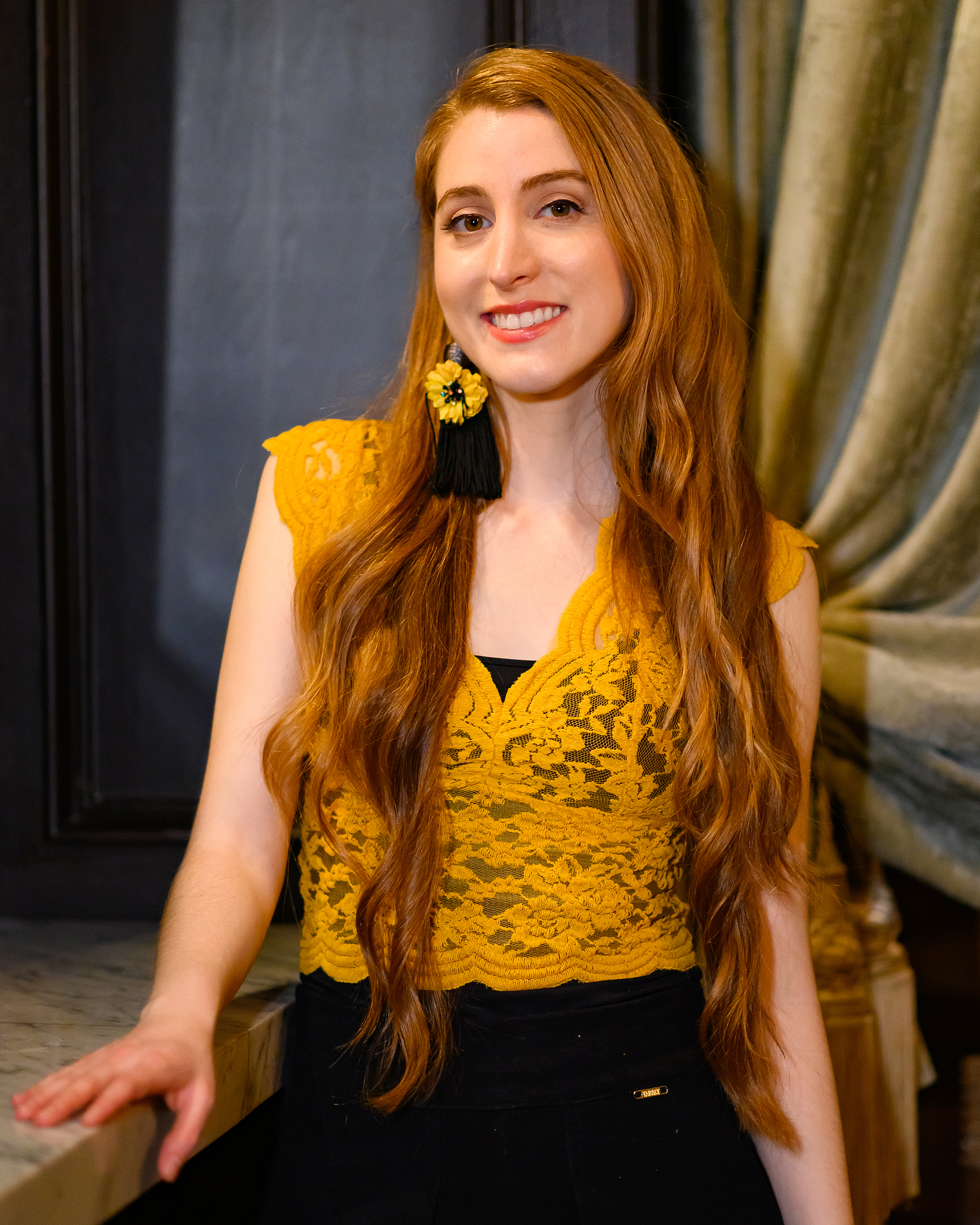
- Herrero in 2019

Background information
- Born: Constanza Belén Herrero Parada; July 10, 1991 (age 35); Santiago, Region Metropolitana, Chile
- Genres: Pop, Folk, Latin, Jazz, Soul
- Occupations: Singer, Songwriter, Actress
- Instruments: Vocals, Guitar, Piano
- Years active: 2007–present
- Website: Official website

Constanza Belén Herrero Parada (born July 10, 1991), is an Australian-Chilean singer, songwriter, and actress. Constanza first gained recognition as a teenager after becoming a member of the MTV award winner band Six Pack performing at Viña del Mar International Song Festival under the artist name “Kota” and starring in the TV Series Karkú, which was broadcast by Nickelodeon. She won the John Lennon Songwriting Contest 2018 Grand Prize and Lennon Award with her original song “Me Voy”. In 2007 she released independently her first original songs in an EP called “Actúa Hoy” under the artist name “Kota”.

== Six Pack and Karkú ==
As a member of Six Pack she recorded two albums, “SixPack Reedición” and “Up”. The singles “Huracanes” and “Up” became No.1 in the Chilean Singles Chart. The music video for “Huracanes” also reached No.1 on the MTV show Los 10 + pedidos. Her original song “I Try” was included in the album “UP”. Constanza starred in the third season of the TV Series “Karkú”, which was broadcast by Nickelodeon Latin America and TVN.

She played “Dana Hamilton” the antagonist of the season. Some of Constanza’s original songs became part of the soundtrack of Karkú. Constanza became the lead singer of the theme song of the TV Series “Nadie me entiende” broadcast by Canal 13. In Nov 2009 Constanza performed with Six Pack at “Día de la música” at Parque O’Higgins. Constanza was invited to sing by Juan Carlos Duque alongside other Chilean singers the song “La fuerza de la libertad” celebrating Chile’s Bicentenary at Chile’s government palace “Palacio de la Moneda”.

== Solo career ==
In 2015 Constanza was invited to sing for His Royal Highness Charles, Prince of Wales to celebrate his 67th birthday at the Cottesloe Civic Centre. In 2016 she sang at the Premier’s Olympic Dinner for the Western Australian Olympic Team going to Rio 2016 and the WA Premier Colin Barnett at the Perth Convention Centre. In 2017 she launched independently her self-titled EP “Constanza Herrero”.

In September 2018 Constanza won the John Lennon Songwriting Contest and in May 2019 she won a Lennon Award as a songwriter for her song “Me Voy” in the Latin Category. The John Lennon Songwriting Contest is an international songwriting contest founded by Yoko Ono in 1997. In February 2019 Constanza was interviewed by Luis Chataing on his show “Conectados”.

== Career ==
=== TV Series ===
- 2009 Karkú 3 as Dana Hamilton
- 2009 Cuentos Clásicos (Pilot) as Caperucita Roja (Red Riding Hood)

=== TV shows ===
- Buenos Dias a Todos: Channel “TVN”:
- Calle 7: Channel “TVN”
- Pollo en Conserva Channel “La Red”:
- Conectados with Luis Chateing

== Awards ==
- MTV LA (Six Pack) - Mejor Artista Nuevo Centro.
- John Lennon Songwriting Contest: Grand Prize and Lennon Award 2018
- LA Music Critic Award 2018

== Discography ==
=== Studio albums ===
- 2008: SixPack Reedición
- 2009: Up

=== Extended Plays Albums ===
- 2007: Actúa Hoy
- 2017: Constanza Herrero
