= Hoy quiero =

Single by Teen Angels
- Released: December 2008 (Argentina)
- Recorded: 2008
- Genre: Pop rock
- Length: 2:51
- Label: Sony Music
- Songwriter(s): Daniel "Dito" Reschigna/Juan Blas Caballero

Teen Angels singles chronology
"Un Paso" (2008)	"Hoy quiero" (2008)	"Que Nos Volvamos A Ver" (2009)

"Hoy quiero" is a Coca-Cola multi-genre song, recorded by various artists, including Teen Angels in Argentina and Kudai in Chile. There are also a rock version by band Ádammo and a cumbia version by Grupo 5.

== Song information ==
The song was produced by Koko Stambuk, and released as promo airplay exclusive single in Argentina and Chile, this song contain three versions recorded by various artists. The song was released as promo also in the TV commercials for Coca-Cola.

== Contest ==
MTV Argentina and Coca-Cola launched a contest exclusively for "Hoy quiero", that is still available. Every participant tape a video and send it to Coca-Cola's official web page. The users vote for their favorite's video. The winner receive a trip to a MTV show.

Argentina Promo Single

1. "Hoy quiero" (Teen Angels Latin Version) – 2:51
2. "Hoy quiero" (Teen Angels Rock Version) – 2:41
3. "Hoy quiero" (Teen Angels Pop Version) – 2:51

== Kudai version ==
"Hoy quiero"

Single by Kudai

from the album Nadha (Edición Especial)
- Released: December 12, 2008 (Chile)
- Recorded: November 2008
- Studio: Estudio 19 (Ciudad de México)
- Genre: Pop, pop rock
- Length: 2:51 (Pop version); 2:41 (Rock version)
- Label: EMI
- Songwriter(s): Daniel "Dito" Reschigna and Juan Blas Caballero
- Producer(s): Koko Stambuk

Kudai singles chronology
"Nada Es Igual" (2008)	"Hoy quiero" (2008)	"Ladrando a La Luna" (2008)

On December 12, 2008, two versions of “Hoy Quiero” were released as a promotional single —a pop version and a rock version—-; both versions included in the special edition of Nadha, released only in Chile and Argentina. Both songs were recorded at Estudios 19 in Mexico City and remastered in a studio in Argentina. It was produced by Koko Stambuk.

The "pop version" of the song was included in the Chilean edition of Kudai's first compilation album Grandes Éxitos, released on June 9, 2010. Kudai's version of “Hoy Quiero” was hailed as “song of the summer” in Chile.

Chile Promo Single

1. "Hoy quiero" (Kudai Pop Version) – 2:51
2. "Hoy quiero" (Kudai Rock Version) – 2:41
