= Morir de amor =

Morir de amor may refer to:

- Morir de Amor (album), by Conjunto Primavera
- "Morir de amor" (Miguel Bosé song) 1980
- "Morir de amor" (Kudai song), 2009
- "Morir d'amor", a 1959 song by Tony Renis

== See also ==
- "Mourir d'aimer", song by Charles Aznavour
