= Kel Calderón =

Kel
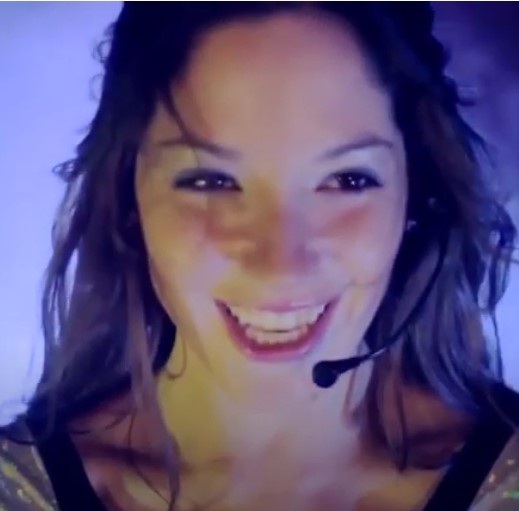
- Kel in concert in 2013

Background information
- Born: Raquel Calderón Argandoña; February 14, 1991 (age 35); Santiago, Chile
- Genres: Pop, pop rock
- Occupations: Lawyer, influencer, singer, actress
- Instrument: Vocals
- Years active: 2006–present
- Label: Feria Music
- Formerly of: Six Pack

Raquel Calderón Argandoña (born 14 February 1991), better known as Kel Calderón or simply Kel, is a Chilean actress, singer and lawyer. She became known at a very early age for being a daughter of television star and beauty pageant titleholder Raquel Argandoña de la Fuente and attorney Hernán Calderón Salinas. Raquel began her acting career in 2006, in the television series Karkú. The band Six Pack, created by the series, launched her musical career. She went solo in 2008, releasing 3 singles and an album under her stage name Kel. Also, in February 2008, Raquel Calderón was crowned Miss Teen Chile 2008. Her mother was the 1975 Miss Universo Chile.

== Professional career ==
=== Television ===
Calderón began her career as an actress in the teen miniseries of TVN called Karkú. The series was released on 5 February 2007, and lasted some months.

As did most teen and pre-teen series on the Chilean television, Karkú also created a musical group, with the series' actors as members. The group was called Six Pack. They recorded a disc that was released in 2007. In spite of the fact that the group did not have a main vocalist, Calderón made herself the main member attracting most attention. Six Pack debuted on stage on 21 July 2007, receiving mixed reviews.

Due to the group's success, Calderón's recording company started preparing a solo career for her. She began taking singing and guitar classes with the Uruguayan singer and musician Gonzalo Yáñez.

At the end of the year, her producing company My Friend obtained a contract with the television channel Canal 13 for a new juvenile teleseries called Antonia. The contract with a rival network displeased TVN.

On 2 January 2008, conflicts between Raquel, her father Hernán Calderón, and the My Friend Entertainment producing company resulted in an abrupt termination of her contract. Her participation in Karkú, Six Pack and Antonia was cancelled.

In 2017, she was working on the program of "maldita moda".

=== Music ===
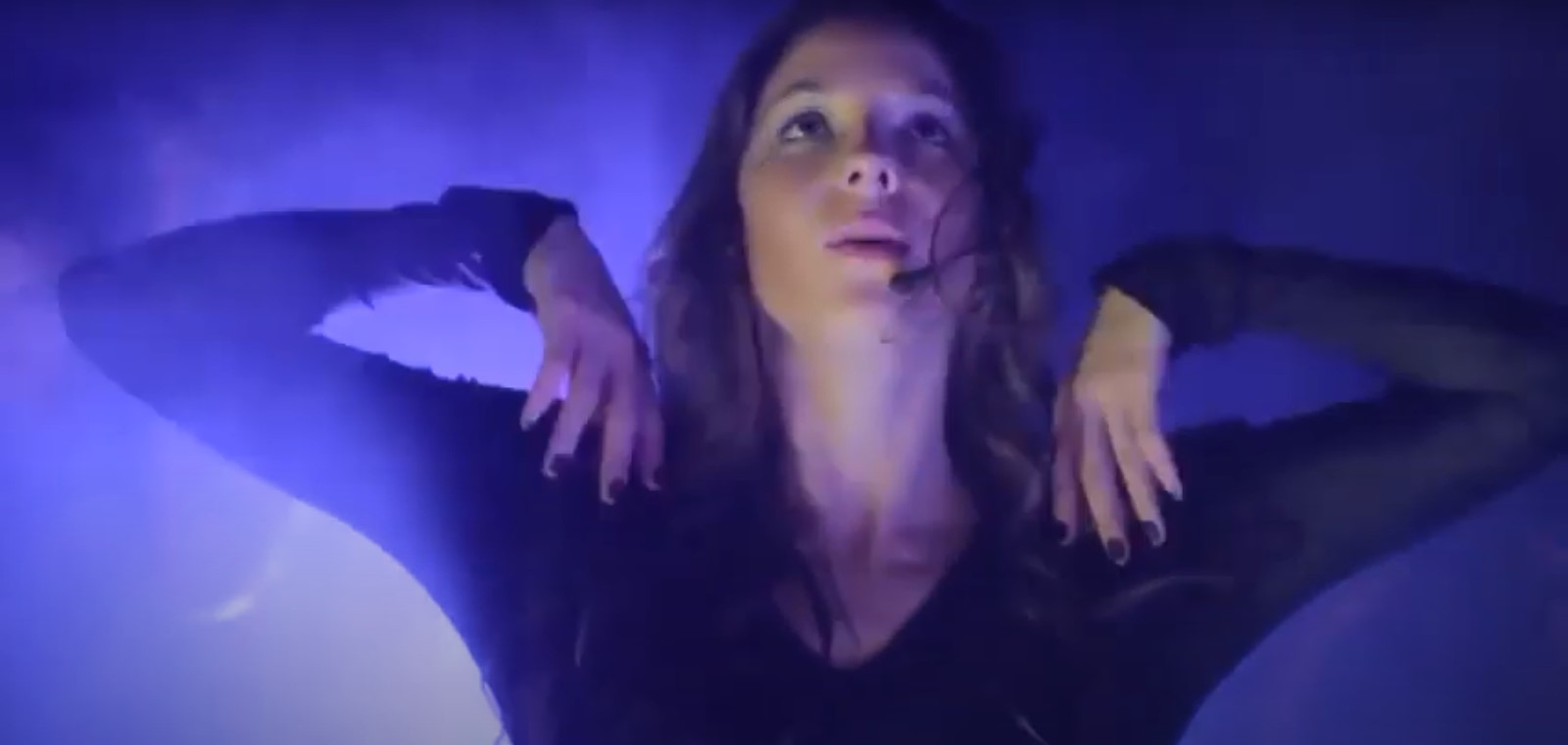
Kel Calderón in 2013

Calderón announced that she would begin a solo career as a singer under the stage name Kel, with Gonzalo Yáñez as her producer. On 14 January 2011, Calderón filmed her first solo music video for her first solo single, "Tenerte cerca", in a Santiago mall. The video was directed by Esteban Vidal. Radio stations started to rotate the song a few days prior.

In February 2008, Calderón was crowned Miss Teen Chile 2008.

On 16 March 2008, Calderón was an opening act for Belinda at her Movistar Arena (then Arena Santiago) concert. She sang six tracks from her album.

On 3 July 2008, Calderón released her first solo album, No molestar!. The album was produced by Gonzalo Yáñez and released via Feria Music. No molestar! was announced during the Viña del Mar International Song Festival but was delayed due to some setbacks.

=== Punks incident ===
At the release of her first disc No molestar!, Chilean punks gathered outside the record shop in Santiago where Calderón was going to release the album. The punks gathered to protest and express their disapproval of Calderón's song "Me Creo Punky" ("I believe I'm a punk"), a pop song whose music video features Calderón and other people dressed and behaving like punk stereotypes. The punks threw objects from the street into the music store and police had to be called to the place. Despite the police action, the release event had to be cancelled. Calderón later declared she was not scared by the punks.

=== University ===
As of 2011, Calderón is a law student. She entered the Faculty of Law of the University of Chile in 2010.

== Personal life ==
In the spring of 2010, she began a relationship with Pablo Schilling. They partnered in a celebrity dance competition called Fiebre de baile, broadcast in Chile on Chilevisión.

== Discography ==
Raquel Calderón performs under the stage name Kel or (more recently) K3l.

=== Studio albums ===
- No molestar! (2008)

=== Singles ===
- "Tenerte cerca" (2008)
- "Me creo punky" (2009)
- "Simplemente" (2011)
- "Walk Away" (2012)
- "Mine" (2013)

== Filmography ==
- Maldito amor (2014)
  See also: Maldito amor#Steffi, Trini & Kel cover

== Awards ==
Year	Nominee / work	Award	Result
2007	Raquel Calderón	BKN Awards 2007, Actriz joven más BKN	Nominated
2007	Six Pack (group)	Los Premios MTV Latinoamérica, Mejor artista nuevo centro	Won

Honorary titles
Preceded by	Miss Teen Chile; 2008	Succeeded by
