= Raquel Argandoña =

Chilean entertainer and mayor

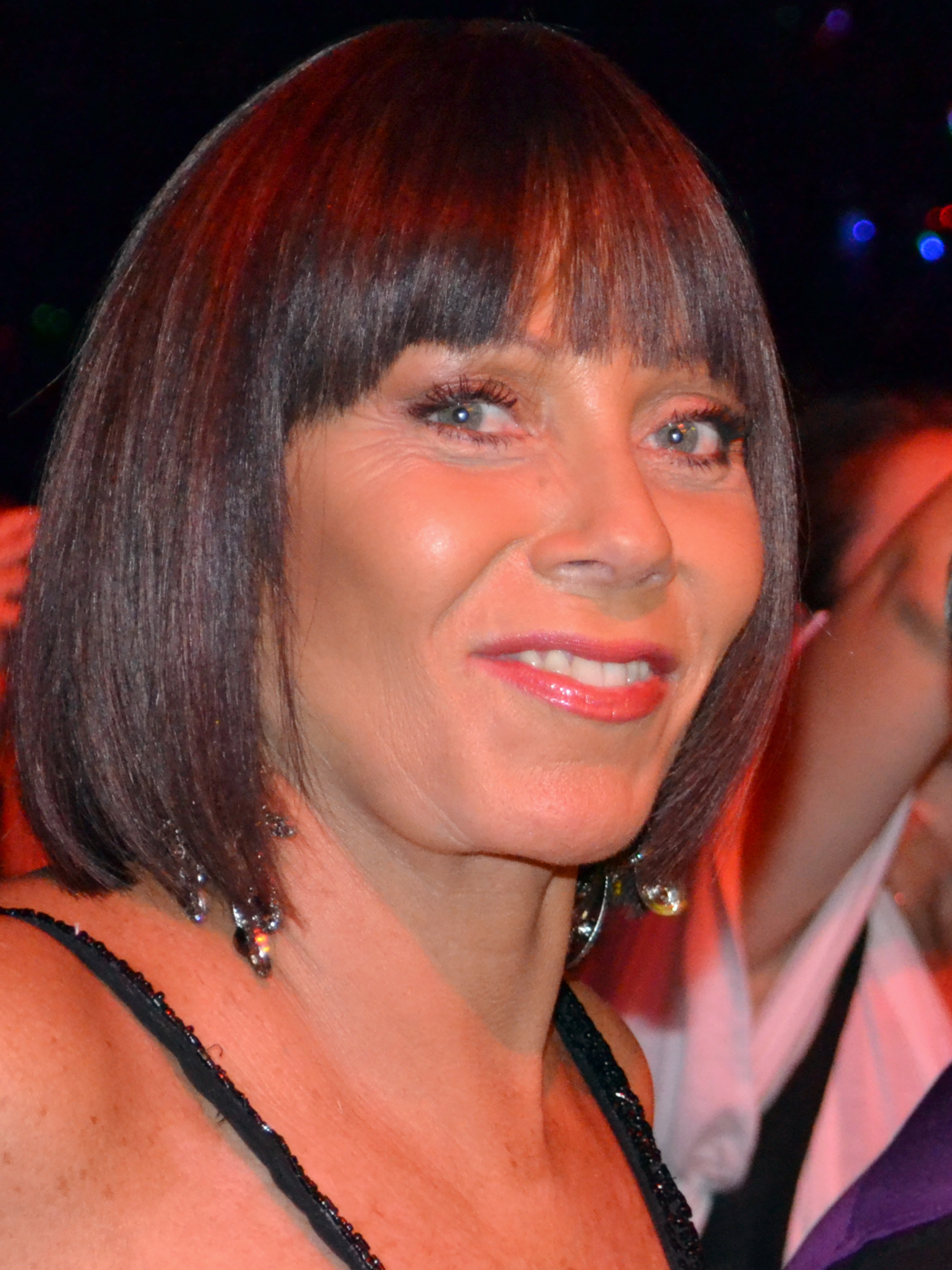
- Raquel Argandoña attending an event in Iquique on February 19, 2011.
- Born: Raquel Eliana Argandoña de la Fuente; December 5, 1957 (age 68); Santiago, Chile
- Occupations: TV presenter, Actress, beauty pageant contestant, mayor
- Parent(s): Eduardo Argandoña L'Huillier (deceased); Eliana de la Fuente Honorato
- Relatives: Raquel Calderón (daughter); Hernán Calderón (son)

Raquel Eliana Argandoña de la Fuente (December 5, 1957) is a Chilean actress, politician, TV host and beauty pageant titleholder. She was mayor of Pelarco in Chile's Maule Region after the 2000 Municipal Elections. She is best known for her role as the La Quintrala in the 1986 TV mini-series of the same name. Raquel Argandoña was the 1975 Miss Universo Chile. Raquel is the mother of the actress-singer Raquel Calderón. She, and her best friend Patricia Maldonado were dancers at private parties for Pinochet and other militars.

In 2025 she was jury on Fiebre de Baile, where she was heavily criticized by the public due to comments attacking a contestant for her body.

== Electoral Resume ==
=== Municipal Elections 1996 ===
Pelarco's mayoralty

Candidate	Party	Votes	%	Results
Bonifacio Correa Echenique	UDI	1.197	27,16%	Mayor
Raquel Argandoña De La Fuente	Indep. RN	1.180	26,78%	Councilor
Mario Contreras Loyola	DC	570	12,93%	Councilor
Rolando González Rojas	PPD	480	10,89%	Councilor
Carlos Verdugo Neira	DC	252	5,70%	
Victor Tonelli Astorga	PRSD	175	3,97%	

=== Municipal Elections 2000 ===
Pelarco's mayoralty

Candidate	Party	Votes	%	Results
Raquel Argandoña De La Fuente	Indep. RN	2.139	45,98%	Mayor
Bonifacio Correa Echenique	UDI	1.384	29,75%	Council
Mario Contreras Loyola	DC	400	8,60%	Council
Rolando Gonzalez Rojas	PPD	303	6,51%	
Carlos Verdugo Pérez	DC	182	3,91%	
Elizabeth Orellana Varas	ILC	84	1,81%	Council

=== Municipal Elections 2004 ===
San Joaquín's mayoralty

Candidate	Party	Votes	%	Results
Sergio Echeverría García	PPD	25.063	53,10%	Mayor
Raquel Argandoña De La Fuente	Indep. RN	17.384	36,83%	
José Benito Ormeño Díaz	PH	4.754	10,07%	

=== Parliamentary Elections 2005 ===
Deputy for the Distrito 25 (La Granja, Macul and San Joaquín), Región Metropolitana

Candidate	Party	Votes	%	Results
Ximena Vidal Lázaro	PPD	52.745	33,81%	Deputy
Marcelo Ortiz Aravena	PDC	32.614	20,90%	
Felipe Salaberry Soto	UDI	30.109	19,30%	Deputy
Raquel Argandoña De La Fuente	Indep. RN	21.958	14,07%	
Amaro Labra Sepúlveda	PC	12.998	8,33%	
Juan Enrique Prieto Urzúa	PH	5.600	3,59%	
