= Morir de amor (Kudai song) =

"Morir de Amor"

Single by Kudai

from the album Nadha
- Released: February 9, 2009
- Recorded: 2007
- Genre: Emo pop; dance; synth-pop; pop rock
- Length: 3:56
- Label: EMI
- Songwriter(s): Koko Stambuk, Kudai
- Producer(s): Koko Stambuk

Kudai singles chronology
| "Ladrando a la Luna" (2009) | "Morir de Amor" (2009) | "Disfraz" (2009) |

Music video
- "Morir de Amor" on YouTube

"Morir de Amor" is a pop song recorded by Chilean band Kudai and is the third single for their third studio album, Nadha. The release of the single was accompanied by a campaign against gender violence, supported by the United Nations Population Fund.

== Composition ==
"Morir de Amor" was composed by Koko Stambuk and Kudai, and was recorded at Estudios 19 in Mexico City in late 2007. It was produced by Stambuk and Carlos Lara. Gabriela Villalba revealed that they were inspired to write the song after a social activist in Guatemala told them a tragic story of intimate partner violence. "We realized that it was necessary to talk to the youth about this situation as a way of prevention or to prevent it from continuing to happen in their immediate environment," she explained.

== Music video ==
Gabriela and Tomas in the music video.

This music video for "Morir De Amor" was shot in Buenos Aires, Argentina on 15-16 February 2009. The filming lasted 48 hours and was directed by Ariel Evasio. The video addresses the story of two young people who are entangled in a loving relationship charged with extreme violence, which leads to fear, insecurity and confusion. Some scenes in the video are strong, "because we wanted people to identify the first signs of this violence that affects women and men."

The music video was premiered in their website Amorsinviolencia.com on March 28, 2009, and premiere on television on 30 March 2009. It was part of a campaign called "Prevention of Violence in Dating Relationships" promoted by the United Nations Population Fund (UNFPA) and the Mexican Youth Institute (IMJUVE), against physical and psychological violence in relationships.

In an article about the song's video, the Mexican news agency Informador detailed that “the shift from love to fear can lead to violence and leave couples trapped in a destructive courtship”.

== Track listing ==
CD Single

1. "Morir de Amor" (Album Version) – 3:56
2. "Morir de Amor" (Radio Edit) – 3:54

== Chart performance ==
| Chart | Peak position |
|---|---|
| Argentina Airplay (Top Latino) | 3 |
| Bolivia Airplay (Top Latino) | 5 |
| Mexico Pop Español Airplay (Billboard) | 32 |
