= Supernova (Chilean band) =

Chilean pop band

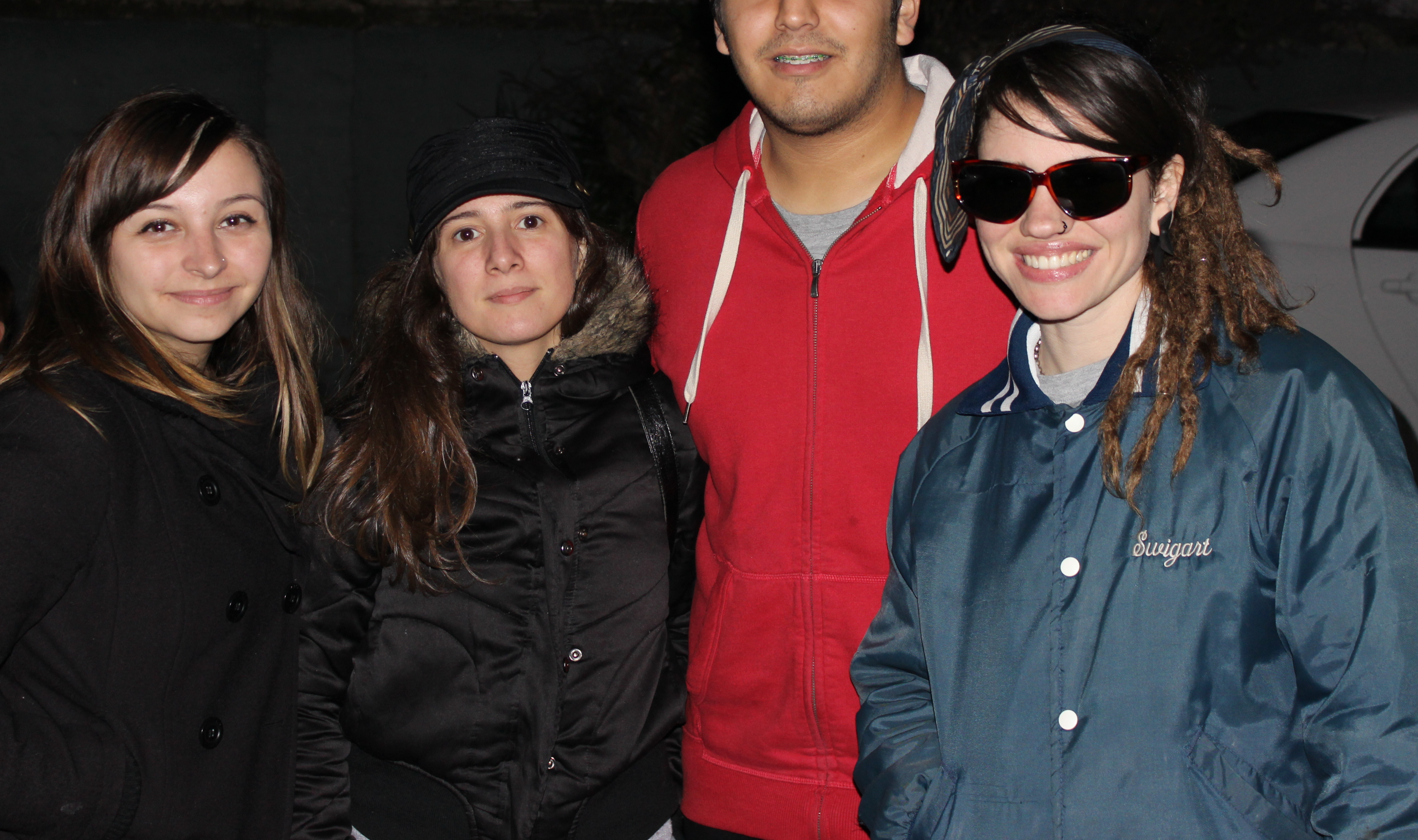
- Constanza Lüer, Constanza Lewin and Elisa Montes in 2013.

Background information
- Origin: Santiago, Chile
- Genres: Pop; teen pop
- Years active: 1993–2003; 2007–present
- Labels: BMG Chile; Sony Music Chile
- Members: Constanza Lewin; Constanza Lüer
- Past members: Elisa Montes; Consuelo Edwards; Claudia González; Sabina Odone

Supernova is a Chilean pop band consisting of Constanza Lüer and Constanza Lewin. It was initially created by Koko Stambuk and Cristian Heyne, influenced by American teen pop of the 90s.

Between 1999 and 2001, Supernova was integrated by Constanza "Coni" Lewin, Elisa Montes and Consuelo "Chi-K" Edwards, and from 2001 to 2003 by Claudia González, Constanza "Koni" Lüer and Sabina Odone. Both groups of girls only recorded one studio album each, the first one was Supernova which sold 45,000 copies, and achieved Double Platinum, and the second was Retráctate which was a Latin Grammy nominee for Best Pop Vocal Album, Duo or Group.

Several times the original group performed live on Blondie Discothèque and in 2010 the group returned for a mini tour.

== Discography ==
=== Albums ===
- Supernova (1999)
- Retráctate (2002)

=== Singles ===
| Title | Year | Peak chart positions | Album |
| Title | Year | CHI | Album |
|---|---|---|---|
| "Toda la noche" | 1999 | 26 | Supernova |
| "Maldito amor" | 2000 | 1 | Supernova |
| "Tú y yo" | 2000 | 3 | Supernova |
| "Sin ti soy un fantasma" | 2001 | 51 | Supernova |
| "Herida" | 2002 | 8 | Retráctate |
| "Se te olvida" | 2002 | 33 | Retráctate |
| "Pocas palabras" | 2002 | 18 | Retráctate |
"—" denotes items which were not released in that country or failed to chart.
