= Miss World Chile =

Beauty pageant

- Type: Beauty pageant
- Headquarters: Santiago
- Country represented: Chile
- Qualifies for: Miss World
- First edition: 1963
- Most recent edition: 2025
- Current titleholder: Ignacia Fernández; Las Condes
- President: Keno Manzur
- Language: Spanish

Miss World Chile (Spanish: Miss Mundo Chile) is a national beauty pageant that selects Chile's official representative to Miss World—one of the Big Four beauty pageants.

The current titleholder is Ignacia Fernández of Las Condes, will represent Chile at Miss World 2026 pageant.

== History ==
Chile has sent 41 representatives, has had three Miss World Semi-Finalists and One Quarter-Finalist. In 1998, Daniella Campos won the title of Queen of the Americas and in 2011 Gabriela Pulgar won the Talent Competition.

The first Miss World Chile was selected from a small group of contestants by an Argentinian company that had the franchise for five South American countries.

During the early 1980s and to the late 1990s, Channel 13 transmitted Miss Mundo Chile Semi-Finals and Finals.

From 2011 to 2013, the Chilean representative was selected under the Miss Chile organization. During the last two years of the organization, the Chilean representative has been selected through reality show No Basta con Ser Bella and Proyecto Miss Chile, transmitted by Channel 13 in conjunction with the president of Miss Chile – in that time – Carla Marin.

In 2014, Miss Chile was dissolved, leaving the country without a representative to the International Contest. In 2015 Chile will send a representative, this time under the franchise Miss Mundo Chile organized by Ricardo Güiraldes and Eugenio Manzur.

== Titleholders ==
Color key

- Declared as Winner
- Ended as runner-up
- Ended as one of the finalists or semifinalists
- Ended as special awards winner

The winner of Miss Mundo Chile represents her country at the Miss World. On occasion, when the winner does not qualify (due to age) a runner-up is sent.

Year	Represented	Miss World Chile	Placement at Miss World	Special awards
2026	Las Condes	Ignacia Fernández	Unplaced	
2025	Los Ángeles	Francisca Lavandero	Unplaced	
2024	No competition held			
2023	Las Condes	Ámbar Zenteno	Unplaced	Sports challenge (1st Runner-up)
2022	No competition held			
2021	Punta Arenas	Carol Drpic	Top 40	Miss World Talent (3rd Runner-up); Beauty with a Purpose (Top 28)
2020	Due to the impact of COVID-19 pandemic, no pageant in 2020			
2019	Viña del Mar	Ignacia Albornoz Olmedo	Unplaced	
2018	Santiago	Anahi Hormazabal Garay	Top 30	Head To Head Group 7 (Winner); Miss World Top Model (Top 32); Beauty with a Purpose (Top 12)
2017	Puerto Montt	Victoria Stein Muñoz	Unplaced	
2016	Coquimbo	Antonia Figueroa Alvarado	Unplaced	Miss World Talent (Top 10); Beauty with a Purpose (Top 24)
2015	Santiago	Fernanda Sobarzo Aguilera	Unplaced	
2014	Did not compete			
2013	Concepción	Camila Andrade Mora	Unplaced	Miss World Beach Beauty (Top 33); Dances of the World (Top 11)
2012	La Serena	Camila Recabarren Adaros	Unplaced	Miss World Top Model (Top 10)
2011	Viña del Mar	Gabriela Pulgar Luco	Top 20	Miss World Talent (Winner); Miss World Sports (Top 24)
Did not compete between 2009—2010
2008	Santiago	Nataly Chilet Bustamante	Unplaced	
2007	Viña del Mar	Bernardita Zúñiga Huesbe	Unplaced	
2006	Santiago	Constanza Silva Aguayo	Unplaced	
2005	Santiago	Christianne Balmelli Fournier	Unplaced	
2004	Santiago	Verónica Roberts Olcay	Unplaced	
2003	La Serena	Patricia Soler Artigues	Unplaced	
2002	Viña del Mar	Daniela Casanova Müller	Unplaced	
2001	Temuco	Christianne Balmelli Fournier	Unplaced	
2000	Linares	Isabel Bawlitza Muñoz	Top 10	
1999	Arica	Lissette Sierra Ocayo	Unplaced	
1998	Santiago	Daniella Campos Lathrop	Top 10	Miss World America
1997	Viña del Mar	Paulina Mladinic Zorzano	Unplaced	
1996	Santiago	Luz Valenzuela Höllzer	Unplaced	
1995	Santiago	Tonka Tomicic Petric	Unplaced	
1994	Santiago	Yulissa del Pino Pinochet	Unplaced	
1993	Punta Arenas	Jéssica Eterovic Pozas	Unplaced	
1992	Santiago	Paula Caballero Fernández	Unplaced	
1991	Santiago	Carolina Michelson Martínez	Unplaced	
1990	Santiago	Isabel Jara Pizarro	Unplaced	
1989	Santiago	Claudia Bahamondes Celis	Unplaced	
1988	Santiago	Francisca Aldunate Sanhueza	Unplaced	
1987	Punta Arenas	Yasna Vukasovic Álvarez	Unplaced	Swimsuit Competition (Top 10 )
1986	Santiago	Margot Fuenzalida Montt	Unplaced	
1985	Santiago	Lydia Labarca Birke	Unplaced	
1984	Santiago	Soledad García Leinenweber	Unplaced	
1983	Santiago	Gina Rovira Beyris	Unplaced	
1982	Santiago	Mariana Reinhardt Lagos	Unplaced	
1981	Viña del Mar	Susanna Bravo Indo	Unplaced	
1980	Did not compete			
1979	Santiago	Mariela Toledo Rojas	Unplaced	
1978	Santiago	Trinidad Sepúlveda Pavón	Unplaced	
1977	Santiago	Annie Garling Vial	Unplaced	
1976	Santiago	Cristina Granzow Cartagena	Unplaced	
Did not compete between 1970—1975
1969	Santiago	Ana Nazar Mayor del Arco	Unplaced	
1968	Santiago	Carmen Smith	Unplaced	
1967	Santiago	Margarita Téllez Gabella	Top 15	
1966	Santiago	Amelia Galaz Cortés	Unplaced	
Did not compete between 1964—1965
1963	Valparaíso	Pilar Aguirre Gómez	Unplaced	

== See also ==
- Miss Universe Chile
