= Tonka Tomicic =

Chilean model and television presenter (born 1976)

Tonka Tomicic Petric
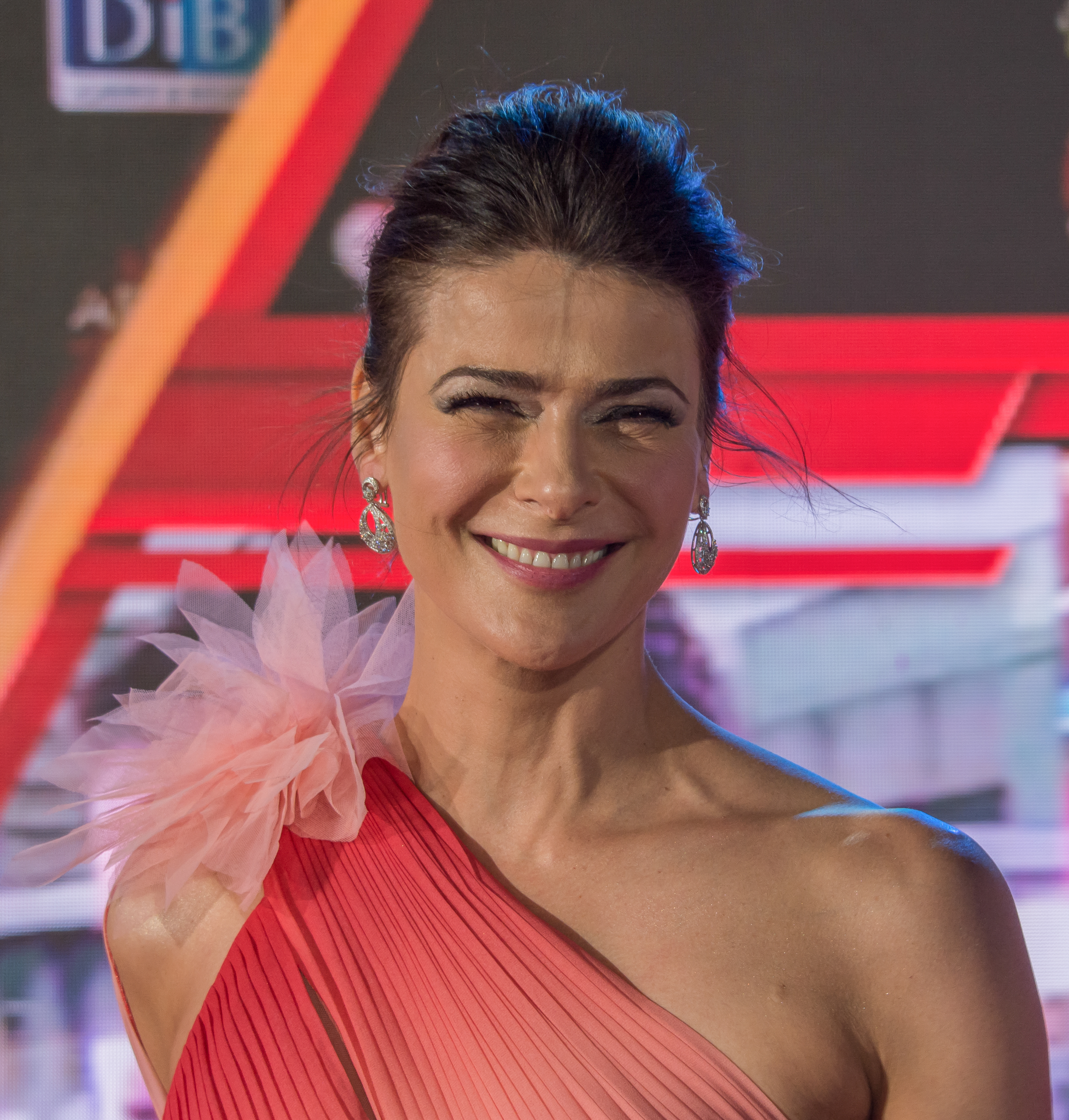
- Born: Tonka Tomicic Petric; 31 May 1976 (age 50); Antofagasta, Chile
- Height: 5 ft 8.5 in (1.74 m)
- Spouse: Parived (m.2014)
- Beauty pageant titleholder
- Title: Miss World Chile 1995; Miss Atlántico Internacional 1999
- Hair color: Brown
- Eye color: Brown
- Major competitions: Miss World 1995; Reina Sudamericana 1996 (1st runner-up); Miss Atlántico Internacional 1999 (Winner)

Tonka Tomicic Petric (Croatian: Tonka Tomičić Petrić; born 31 May 1976) is a Chilean TV host and beauty pageant titleholder. She is of Croatian origin.

Best known for television shows on TVN and Canal 13 as Buenos Dias A Todos, Viña's International Festival and Bienvenidos. She's considered one of the most important female TV personalities of Chile. After being a former fashion model in Chile, Tomicic became the face and spoken celebrity of "Almacenes Paris", a department store since 2005 and Garnier's Chilean ambassador since 2007. Her parents are Croatian immigrants to Chile.

== Early life ==
She was born on 31 May 1976, in Antofagasta, Chile. Her parents are Antonio Tomičić and Marija Petrić, both Croatian immigrants to Chile. Tomicic grew up in the commune of La Florida, Santiago, she completed her primary and secondary education at the Colegio Argentino del Sagrado Corazón de Jesús, in Providencia, In 1994 she entered the Universidad Tecnológica Metropolitana to study design in visual communication, leaving her studies unfinished.

== Career ==
She was discovered as a model by New Models Agency in Chile at 14 years old. After the first contact, Tomičić filmed her first television commercial for the Tigre shoe company. She was crowned queen of the XXIV version of the Miss World 1995 Chilean Version pagated, and representing her country in the Miss World 1995 pageant held in South Africa. Her career as a beauty queen continued when she was crowned Virreina Sudamericana 1996 in Bolivia and Miss Atlántico Internacional 1999 in Uruguay.

In 2002, she was invited to the program Pase lo que Pase of TVN as a fashion commentator. She received her big break when she became one of the principal co-presenters of this program and went on to assume the co-presenter role of Buenos dias a todos, a popular morning television show. In February 2006, Tomicic was the presenter of the Viña del Mar International Music Festival, in 2007 and 2008 with Sergio Lagos. In 2009 Tomic leaves "Buenos Dias a Todos" and TVN thanks to an offer from "Canal 13" to become the presenter of the morning program "Bienvenidos" and the prime shows: "El Hormiguero", Tonka Tanka and as host of the reality show Mundos Opuestos.

Tomicic is currently face and spoken celebrity of Almacenes Paris department store chain since 2005, as well as the Claro telecommunications company and has beene the Garnier's Chilean brand ambassador since 2007, where there is a dye called "Chocolate Tonka".

== Personal life ==
Since 2004, she has been in a romantic relationship with Marco Antonio López Spagui, better known as Parived. The couple were married according to the Jewish rite on 16 April 2014, in the city of Jerusalem, Israel, after Tomičić renounced Catholicism, thus embracing her partner's Judaism.

== Television ==
- La mañana del 13 (2001 Canal 13)
- Pase lo que pase (2002 TVN)
- Buenos días a todos (2005–2009)
- Teletón Chile (2006)
- Teletón Chile (2007)
- Hijos del Monte (2008)
- Teletón Chile (2008)
- El hormiguero (2010)
- Viva la mañana (2010) – Guest Star
- La movida del festival (2010) – TV Hostess
- Chile ayuda a Chile (2010)
- Tonka Tanka (2010) – TV Hostess
- Primera dama (2010)
- Fear Factor Chile (2010)
- Alfombra roja (2010)
- Teletón Chile (2010)
- Bienvenidos (2011–) – TV Hostess
- Teletón Chile (2011)
- Mundos Opuestos (2012)
- No basta con ser bella: Miss Chile 2012 (2012) – Jury
- Teletón Chile (2012)
- Proyecto Miss Chile (2013) – TV Hostess

Awards and achievements
Preceded by Yulissa Del Pino	Miss World Chile; 1995	Succeeded by Luz Francisca Valenzuela
