= Ya nada queda =

Single by Kudai

from the album Vuelo
- Released: October 10, 2004 (Chile)
- Recorded: 2004
- Genre: Teen pop
- Length: 3:42
- Label: EMI Latin
- Songwriter: Gustavo Pinochet
- Producer: Gustavo Pinochet

Kudai singles chronology
"Sin Despertar" (2004)	"Ya nada queda" (2004)	"Escapar" (2005)

"Ya nada queda" is a song by Chilean group Kudai for their debut studio album, Vuelo (2004). Written and produced by Gustavo Pinochet, it was released on October 10, 2004, as the second single from the album. There is an English version of the song, titled "It's Over".

== Music video ==
The music video for this song was released on 28 October 2004. The music video was premiered on Zona Latina music channel of Chile. Later premiered on MTV.

== Charts ==
Chart (2005–2006)	Peak position
Chile (Notimex)	3
Colombia (Notimex)	3
Panama (Notimex)	5
