= Sobrevive =

Studio album by Kudai
- Released: June 16, 2006 (Chile)
- Recorded: 2005–2006 in Chile
- Genres: Emo pop; alternative rock; pop punk; teen pop; power pop
- Length: 45:49
- Label: EMI
- Producers: Guz; Alejandro Varela; Dr. Alfa

Kudai chronology
Vuelo (2004)	Sobrevive (2006)	En Vivo: Desde México (2007)

Alternative cover
- Re-edition cover

Singles from Sobrevive
- 1. "Déjame Gritar" Released: 20 March 2006; 2. "Llévame" Released: 8 September 2006; 3. "Tal Vez" Released: 14 January 2007; 4. "Tú" Released: 6 August 2007

Sobrevive is the second album of the Chilean pop rock band Kudai released on June 16, 2006. Debuted at number one in their native country and certified platinum and sold 350,000 copies worldwide.

== Album information ==
This album is the last record on which Nicole Natalino sang. She left the group due to personal problems. After the departure of Nicole, Gabriela Villalba replaced her and re-record the album featuring Gabriela's voice.

The first single is "Déjame Gritar" which went #1 in Chile and Argentina. The video of the single features Nicole before her departure and also hit #1 spot on many TV channels and programs like MTV Argentina 'Los 10+ Pedidos' and MTV Centro 'Top 20'.

== Track listing ==
1. "Intro" ("Intro") (Guz) – 0:42
2. "Tal Vez" ("Maybe") (Guz, Dr. Alfa) – 3:29
3. "Llévame" ("Take Me Away") (Guz) – 3:44
4. "Ya No Quiero Más" ("I Don't Want Anymore") (Guz, Juan José Arranguiz) – 3:14
5. "Aún" ("Still") (Guz) – 4:19
6. "Déjame Gritar" ("Let Me Scream") (Guz, Dr. Alfa) – 3:17
7. "Hoy No Estas" ("You're Not Here Today") (Guz) – 4:12
8. "Si He Tocado El Suelo" ("Even If I Touched The Rock Bottom") (Guz, Dr. Alfa, Mai) – 3:04
9. "Volar" ("Fly") (Guz, Dr. Alfa) – 3:41
10. "Siempre" ("Always") (Guz) – 4:16
11. "Okey" ("OK!") (Guz, Dr. Alfa) – 3:25
12. "Ven" ("Come") (Guz) – 4:16
13. "Llévame" (Acústico) ("Take Me" (Acoustic)) (Guz) – 3:43
14. "Volar" (Acústico) ("Fly" (Acoustic)) (Guz) – 3:27
15. "No Estaré Allí" (featuring Ilona) ("I Won't Be There") (Richard Narváez, Ilona) – 4:33
16. "En La Vereda Del Frente" (featuring Leo García) ("On the sidewalk in front") (Leo García) – 3:43
17. "Quiero Mis Quinces" (Show MTV Latin America) ("I Want My 15s") (Guz, Dr. Alfa) – 3:26

== Sobrevive re-edition ==
This is the re-edition of Kudai's sophomore album which features new member voice, the Ecuadorian Gabriela Villalba, ex-member of Ecuador Popstars group Kiruba. The second version of the album was released on September 26, 2006 in Chile and in December 2006 in Mexico.

To relaunch the album and promote for the second time, the video of "Déjame Gritar" was made it again, replacing Nicole's parts and put Gabriela's performance. The second single is "Llévame" and this performs at all Gabriella Villalba. The video also features the new member and it was filmed in Los Andes in Chile. The third single is "Tal Vez" which is also performed by the band including Gabriela Villalba's voice and image, the fourth and final single is "Tú" which was recorded especially for this re-edition and it's the first Kudai song originally recorded by Villalba.

This version of the record is promoted in Latinoamerica. In addition to replace Nicole's voice, the track listing also changed a little bit. The song "Si He Tocado El Suelo" was removed and put a new one called "Tú", wrote by producer Koko Stambuck instead of Gustavo Pinochet and Dr. Alfa, who also left Kudai's team.

=== Track list ===
1. "Intro" ("Intro") (Guz) – 0:42
2. "Tal Vez" ("Maybe") (Guz, Dr. Alfa) – 3:29
3. "Llévame" ("Take Me Away") (Guz) – 3:44
4. "Ya No Quiero Más" ("I Don't Want Anymore") (Guz, Juan José Arranguiz) – 3:14
5. "Aún" ("Still") (Guz) – 4:19
6. "Déjame Gritar" ("Let Me Scream") (Guz, Dr. Alfa) – 3:17
7. "Hoy No Estas" ("You're Not Here Today") (Guz) – 4:12
8. "Volar" ("Fly") (Guz, Dr. Alfa) – 3:41
9. "Siempre" ("Always") (Guz) – 4:16
10. "Okey" ("OK!") (Guz, Dr. Alfa) – 3:25
11. "Ven" ("Come") (Guz) – 4:16
12. "Llévame" (Acústico) ("Take Me" (Acoustic)) (Guz) – 3:43
13. "Volar (Acústico)" ("Fly" (Acoustic)) (Guz) – 3:27
14. "No Estaré Allí" (featuring Ilona) ("I Won't Be There") (Richard Narváez, Ilona) – 4:33
15. "En La Vereda Del Frente" (featuring Leo García) ("On the sidewalk in front") (Leo García) – 3:43
16. "Quiero Mis Quinces" (Show MTV Latin America) ("I Want My 15s") (Guz, Dr. Alfa) – 3:26
17. "Tú" ("You") (Guz, Koko Stambuk) – 4:05

== Charts ==
Chart (2007)	Peak position
Mexican Albums (AMPROFON)	39

== Sales and certifications ==
Region	Certification	Certified units/sales
Mexico (AMPROFON)	Gold	50,000^{^}
^{^} Shipments figures based on certification alone.

== Personnel ==
- Choir arrangement: Rodrigo Apablaza
- Vocal lead: Kudai
- Arranger: Juan José Aranguiz
- Keyboards, programming, vocal arrangement, editing: Juan José Aranguiz
- Mixing, coros: Juan José Aranguiz, recording: Juan José Aranguiz
- Bass (electric): Daniela Castro and Fernando Sepulveda
- Art coordinator: Verónica Correa
- Bass (electric): Alejandro Gonzalez
- Mixing, recording: Pablo Gonzalez
- Engineer: Andrés Mayo
- Make-up: Vanessa Souza
- Executive producer: Alejandro Varela
- Art direction, creative consultant: Pablo Vega
