= Vuelo (album) =

Studio album by Kudai
- Released: July 10, 2004
- Recorded: 2003 in Chile
- Genre: Pop rock; teen pop; emo pop; power pop
- Length: 45:49
- Label: EMI
- Producer: Guz

Kudai chronology
El Poder de los Niños (1999)	Vuelo (2004)	Sobrevive (2006)

Alternative cover
- Mexican cover

Singles from Vuelo
- 1. "Sin Despertar" Released: April 19, 2004; 2. "Ya Nada Queda" Released: September 13, 2004; 3. "Escapar" Released: April 4, 2005; 4. "Lejos De La Ciudad" Released: October 17, 2005

Vuelo is the debut studio album by Chilean pop rock band Kudai, released on July 10, 2004 in Chile and two years later in Mexico and the rest of Latin America. After finishing their project as a children's band CIAO, Pablo Holman, Bárbara Sepúlveda, Nicole Natalino and Tomas Manzi, began to prepare a new stage as a teenage band with the help of their manager, Pablo Vega, and composer Gustavo Pinochet. Thus was conceived Kudai, which derives from the Mapudungun word "kudau" (native Chilean language), which according to the band members means "young worker".

The album contains 13 tracks, of which most of the lyrics are about problems related to adolescence such as depression, the illusion of first love and breakups.

== Track listing ==
1. "Escapar" (Escape) (Guz) — 4:44
2. "Sin Despertar" (Without Waking Up) (Guz) — 3:16
3. "Ya Nada Queda" (There's Nothing Left) (Guz) — 3:41
4. "No Quiero Regresar" (I Don't Want To Return) (Guz, Juan José Arranguiz) — 3:08
5. "Más" (More) (Guz) — 3:18
6. "Que Aquí Que Allá" (That Here That There) (Guz) — 3:43
7. "Quiero" (I Want) (Guz) — 3:25
8. "Lejos De La Ciudad" (Far From The City) (Guz, Dr. Alfa) — 4:03
9. "Vuelo" (Flight) (Guz, Dr. Alfa, Mai) — 3:07
10. "Dulce Y Violento" (Sweet & Violent) (Guz) — 3:25
11. "Sin Despertar (Versión Acústica)" (Without Waking Up (Acoustic Version)) (Guz) — 3:51
12. "Escapar (Versión Acústica)" (Escape (Acoustic Version)) (Guz) — 2:57
13. "Algo De Más" (Something Else) (Guz) — 3:12

== Personnel ==
Kudai

- Pablo Holman – lead and backing vocals, acoustic guitar (track 6)
- Bárbara Sepúlveda – lead and backing vocals
- Tomás Manzi (aka Tomás Cañas) – lead and backing vocals, acoustic guitar (track 1)
- Nicole Natalino – lead and backing vocals

Musicians and production

- Nicolás Rioseco – electric and acoustic guitars (tracks 2, 3 and 5)
- Dr. Alfa – additional recorder, keyboards, programming, samplers, acoustic and electric guitars, composer (tracks 2, 3, 5, 8, 9 and 13)
- Guz – production, mix, keyboards, programming, samplers, composer (tracks 1–7, 10–12), backing vocals
- Juan José Aranguiz – recorder, mix, acoustic and electric guitars, composer (tracks 12 and 12), bass (track 4), additional keyboards (track 12), backing vocals (tracks 1 and 4)
- Pablo Vega – art direction
- Daniel Guerrero – backing vocals (track 5)
- Pía Ovalle – backing vocals (track 3, 5 and 11)
- Carla González – backing vocals
- Ghio – backing vocals
- Pía Ovalle – backing vocals (tracks 3, 5 and 11)
- Cristián Heyne – bass (track 6)
- Mike Bass – bass (track 8)
- Lizeth Rojas – design (album)
- Felipe Palma – design, photography
- Daniel Peralta – design (logo)
- Yomary Peña – executive producer
- Isabel Margarita Freire – art direction, executive producer
- Joaquín García – mastering

== Chart ==
=== Weekly charts ===
Chart (2004–2006)	Peak position
Chilean Album Chart	1
Mexican Albums Chart	14

=== Year-end charts ===
Chart (2006)	Position
Mexican Album Chart	79

== Certifications and sales ==
Region	Certification	Certified units/sales
Argentina (CAPIF)	Gold	20,000^{^}
Chile	—	60,000
Chile DVD	—	7,000
Mexico (AMPROFON)	Gold	50,000^{^}
^{^} Shipments figures based on certification alone.

== Release history ==
Country	Release date
Chile	July 10, 2004
Mexico	July 2006
