= Koko Stambuk =

Chilean singer-songwriter and producer

- Origin: Osorno, Chile
- Genre: Latin pop / Pop rock
- Years active: 1996–present
- Label: Warner Bros. Records

Cristián Daniel Stambuk Sandoval (born March 16, 1977, in Osorno, Chile), better known by his stage name Koko, is a Chilean singer-songwriter and producer, known for being the singer of the band Glup! and producing artists like Kudai, Luis Fonsi, Reik, Denise Rosenthal and Maite Perroni who was also his girlfriend from 2013 to 2020. His parents were Croatian immigrants.

== Career ==
Koko began his career on 1996 being the lead man and songwriter of the Chilean band Glup! until 2002. After the split off of Glup!, Koko participated on the soundtracks of En la cama, Cesante and Los Debutantes. Along with Cristian Heyne formed the successful pop groups Supernova, Stereo 3, Amango, CRZ, Gufi, Kudai, Six Pack and worked with singers Kel and Denise Rosenthal. In 2006 formed part of the creation of the first virtual band Frijoles along with Luis Tata Bigorra (former Los Tetas) and Chico Claudio.

In addition to overseeing recordings for artist like Luis Fonsi and Reik in 2009 released his first studio album called Valiente for this work in 2010 was nominated for the Latin Grammy Award for Best New Artist, but lost against Alex Cuba.

=== Latin Grammy Awards ===
A Latin Grammy Award is an accolade by the Latin Academy of Recording Arts & Sciences to recognize outstanding achievement in the music industry. Koko has received one nomination.

Year	Nominee / work	Award	Result
2010	Koko	Best New Artist	Lost
