= List of awards and nominations received by Rita Ora =

British singer Rita Ora is the recipient of various awards, including a Bambi Award, a Brits Billion Award, two MTV Europe Music Awards and an MTV Video Music Award, in addition to nominations for five BRIT Awards, a Billboard Music Award and an Echo Award, among others.

== Awards and nominations ==
Name of the award ceremony, year presented, award category, nominee(s) of the award, and the result of the nomination
Award	Year (Note: Indicates the year of ceremony. Each year is linked to the article about the awards held that year, wherever possible.)	Category	Recipient(s)	Result	Ref.
AICP Awards	2015	Sound Design	adidas Originals ad campaign	Won	
Bambi Awards	2015	Music – International	Herself	Won	
BBC Radio 1 Teen Awards	2012	Best British Music Act	Herself	Nominated	
BBC Radio 1 Teen Awards	2012	Best British Single	"R.I.P." (with Tinie Tempah)	Nominated	
BBC Radio 1 Teen Awards	2012	Best British Album	Ora	Nominated	
BBC Radio 1 Teen Awards	2014	Best British Solo Artist	Herself	Nominated	
BET Awards	2013	Best International Act: UK	Herself	Nominated	
BET Awards	2014	Best International Act: UK	Herself	Nominated	
Billboard Music Awards	2015	Top Rap Song	"Black Widow" (with Iggy Azalea)	Nominated	
Black Reel Awards	2015	Best Original Song or Adapted Song	"Grateful" (from Beyond the Lights)	Nominated	
BRIT Awards	2013	British Breakthrough Act	Herself	Nominated	
BRIT Awards	2013	British Single of the Year	"R.I.P." (with Tinie Tempah)	Nominated	
BRIT Awards	2013	British Single of the Year	"Hot Right Now" (with DJ Fresh)	Nominated	
BRIT Awards	2019	British Video of the Year	"Let You Love Me"	Nominated	
BRIT Awards	2019	British Video of the Year	"For You" (from Fifty Shades Freed)	Nominated	
British Phonographic Industry	2023	Brits Billion Award	Herself	Won	
Camerimage	2023	Best Music Video	"Praising You" (with Fatboy Slim)	Nominated	
China Music Awards	2017	Best International Artist	Herself	Won	
D&AD Awards	2023	Sound Design & Use of Music (Original Composition)	Music for Belvedere ad	Nominated	
Daily Front Row's Fashion Media Awards	2021	Style Icon	Herself	Won	
Echo Awards	2018	Best International Rock/Pop Female Artist	Herself	Nominated	
Electronic Dance Music Awards	2024	Remake of the Year	"Praising You"	Nominated	
Electronic Dance Music Awards	2024	House Song of the Year	"Drinkin'"	Nominated	
Electronic Dance Music Awards	2025	Music Video Of The Year	"Last of Us" (with Gryffin)	Pending	
Elle Style Awards Spain	2021	Fashion Artist	Herself	Won	
Glamour Awards	2013	British Solo Artist	Herself	Won	
Glamour Awards	2013	Pandora Breakthrough	Herself	Nominated	
Glamour Awards	2015	TV Personality	Herself (for The Voice UK)	Won	
Glamour Awards	2016	TV Personality	Herself (for The X Factor)	Nominated	
Glamour Awards	2016	British Solo Artist	Herself	Nominated	
Glamour Awards	2022	Entertainer of the Year	Herself	Won	
Global Awards	2018	Best Pop	Herself	Won	
Global Awards	2020	Best Pop	Herself	Nominated	
Harper's Bazaar Women of the Year Awards	2013	Musician of the Year	Herself	Won	
Hollywood Music in Media Awards	2018	Original Song – Feature Film	"For You" (from Fifty Shades Freed)	Nominated	
iHeartRadio Music Awards	2024	Dance Song of the Year	"Praising You" (with Fatboy Slim)	Nominated	
Latin American Music Awards	2019	Favorite Video	"R.I.P" (with Sofía Reyes and Anitta)	Won	
Live Music Business Awards	2013	Breakthrough Artist	Herself	Nominated	
LOS40 Music Awards	2019	Best International Artist	Herself	Nominated	
LOS40 Music Awards	2019	Best International Video	"R.I.P." (with Sofía Reyes and Anitta)	Won	
Lovie Awards	2020	Silver People's Lovie	How to Be Lonely: Digital Experience	Won	
MOBO Awards	2012	Best Newcomer	Herself	Won	
MOBO Awards	2012	Best Female Act	Herself	Nominated	
MOBO Awards	2012	Best Album	Ora	Nominated	
MOBO Awards	2012	Best Video	"R.I.P." (with Tinie Tempah)	Nominated	
MOBO Awards	2013	Best Female Act	Herself	Nominated	
MOBO Awards	2014	Best Female Act	Herself	Nominated	
MOBO Awards	2015	Best Video	"Body on Me"	Nominated	
MP3 Music Awards	2012	Best Newcomer	"Hot Right Now" (with DJ Fresh)	Won	
MTV Europe Music Awards	2012	Best New Act	Herself	Nominated	
MTV Europe Music Awards	2012	Best Push Act	Herself	Nominated	
MTV Europe Music Awards	2012	Best UK & Ireland Act	Herself	Nominated	
MTV Europe Music Awards	2013	Best Look	Herself	Nominated	
MTV Europe Music Awards	2013	Best World Stage	Herself (for WS Malta 2013)	Nominated	
MTV Europe Music Awards	2014	Best Look	Herself	Nominated	
MTV Europe Music Awards	2014	Best Video	"Black Widow" (with Iggy Azalea)	Nominated	
MTV Europe Music Awards	2015	Best Look	Herself	Nominated	
MTV Europe Music Awards	2017	Best Look	Herself	Nominated	
MTV Europe Music Awards	2017	Power of Music Award	As part of Artists for Grenfell initiative	Won	
MTV Europe Music Awards	2022	Best Look 'Personal Style'	Herself	Won	
MTV Millennial Awards	2019	Music – Ship of the Year	"R.I.P." (with Sofía Reyes and Anitta)	Nominated	
MTV Video Music Awards	2018	Visual Effects	"Lonely Together" (with Avicii)	Nominated	
MTV Video Music Awards	2018	Dance Video	"Lonely Together" (with Avicii)	Won	
Music Week Awards	2024	PR Campaign	You & I	Nominated	
Nickelodeon UK Kids' Choice Awards	2013	Favourite UK Female Artist	Herself	Nominated	
Popjustice £20 Music Prize	2018	Best British Pop Single	"Anywhere"	Won	
Popjustice £20 Music Prize	2019	Best British Pop Single	"Ritual"	Nominated	
Premios Juventud	2019	Best Choreography	"R.I.P" (with Sofía Reyes and Anitta)	Nominated	
Premios Lo Nuestro	2020	Crossover Collaboration of the Year	"R.I.P" (with Sofía Reyes and Anitta)	Nominated	
Premios Lo Nuestro	2020	Video of the Year	"R.I.P" (with Sofía Reyes and Anitta)	Nominated	
QQ Music Awards	2016	Best International Female Artist	Herself	Won	
Silver Clef Award	2015	Best Female Artist	Herself	Won	
Spotify Awards	2020	Most-Streamed EDM Female Artist	Herself	Won	
Teen Choice Awards	2014	Choice Music: Breakout Artist	Herself	Nominated	
Teen Choice Awards	2019	Choice Song From A Movie	"Carry On" (from Pokémon Detective Pikachu)	Nominated	
UK Music Video Awards	2012	Best UK Urban Video	"R.I.P." (with Tinie Tempah)	Nominated	
Urban Music Awards	2012	Best Newcomer	Herself	Nominated	
Urban Music Awards	2012	Best Female Act	Herself	Nominated	
Urban Music Awards	2012	Artist of the Year	Herself	Won	
Urban Music Awards	2012	Best International Artist	Herself	Nominated	
Urban Music Awards	2012	Best Single	"R.I.P." (with Tinie Tempah)	Nominated	
Urban Music Awards	2012	Best Album	Ora	Nominated	
Urban Music Awards	2012	Best Music Video	"Hot Right Now" (with DJ Fresh)	Nominated	
Urban Music Awards	2015	Best Video	"Body on Me"	Nominated	
Urban Music Awards	2015	Best Collaboration	"Body on Me"	Nominated	
Urban Music Awards	2017	Artist of the Year	Herself	Nominated	
Urban Music Awards	2017	Best International Act	Herself	Nominated	
Urban Music Awards	2017	Best Female Act	Herself	Nominated	
Urban Music Awards	2017	Best Pop Act	Herself	Nominated	
Variety + H&M Conscious Award	2017	Conscious Award	Herself	Won	
Young Hollywood Awards	2014	Breakout Music Artist	Herself	Nominated	
Young Hollywood Awards	2014	You're So Fancy	Herself	Nominated	
4Music Video Honours	2012	Best Breakthrough	Herself	Nominated	
4Music Video Honours	2012	Best Girl	Herself	Nominated	
4Music Video Honours	2012	Best Video	"Hot Right Now" (with DJ Fresh)	Nominated	
4Music Video Honours	2012	Best Video	"How We Do (Party)"	Nominated	
4Music Video Honours	2012	Best Video	"R.I.P." (with Tinie Tempah)	Nominated	
4Music Video Honours	2014	Best Girl	Herself	Nominated	

== Other accolades ==
- Honorary Ambassador of the Republic of Kosovo (2015)
- Key to the city of Tirana, Albania (2018)
- "Naim Frashëri" Title (2022)
- Key to the city of Pristina, Kosovo (2023)
