= 2019 MTV Europe Music Awards =

Music award

- Date: 3 November 2019
- Location: FIBES Conference and Exhibition Centre, Seville, Andalusia, Spain
- Hosted by: Becky G
- Most wins: BTS (3)
- Most nominations: Ariana Grande (7)
- Website: mtvema.com

Television/radio coverage
- Network: MTV; Channel 5
- Directed by: Liz Clare; Paul Dugdale

The 2019 MTV EMAs (also known as the MTV Europe Music Awards) was held at the FIBES Conference and Exhibition Centre in Seville, Spain, on 3 November 2019. The ceremony's host was Becky G. This was the fourth year, as well as the second consecutive year, that Spain hosted the ceremony. It was also the first time a country hosted back-to-back editions.

Ariana Grande was nominated for seven awards, followed by Billie Eilish, Lil Nas X and Shawn Mendes, who were each nominated for six. BTS won three awards, becoming the most awarded act of the night, followed by Taylor Swift, Halsey and Eilish, who each won two.

In association with the EMAs, an event called MTV Music Week was organised, which run from 31 October to 2 November at different locations throughout the city. Its main concert was held at the Plaza de España on 2 November, headlined by Green Day.

== Performances ==
List of musical performances
Artist(s)	Song(s)
Pre show
Pabllo Vittar	"Flash Pose"
Sofía Reyes; Jhay Cortez	"A Tu Manera (Corbata)"
Main show
Dua Lipa	"Don't Start Now"
Mabel	"Don't Call Me Up"
Niall Horan	"Nice to Meet Ya"
Akon; Becky G	"Cómo No"
Green Day	"Father of All..." "Basket Case" (Filmed at Plaza de España)
Halsey	"Graveyard"
Ava Max	"Torn" "Sweet but Psycho"
Rosalía	"Pienso en tu mirá" "Di mi nombre"
NCT 127	"Highway to Heaven"
Becky G	"24/7" "Sin Pijama" "Mayores"
Liam Gallagher	"Once" "Wonderwall"

== Appearances ==
- Terry Crews — announcer
- Nicole Scherzinger — presented Best Pop
- Afrojack and Georgina Rodríguez — presented Best Collaboration
- Doutzen Kroes and Paz Vega — presented Best Hip Hop
- Joan Smalls and Sway Calloway — presented Best Rock
- Halsey — presented Rock Icon
- Abraham Mateo and Sofía Reyes — presented Best New
- Johnny Orlando and Leomie Anderson — presented Best Video

== Nominations ==
Nominees were announced on October 1, 2019. Winners are in bold text.

Best Song	Best Video
**Billie Eilish — "Bad Guy"**; Ariana Grande — "7 Rings"; Lil Nas X (featuring Billy Ray Cyrus) — "Old Town Road (Remix)"; Post Malone and Swae Lee – "Sunflower"; Shawn Mendes and Camila Cabello — "Señorita"	**Taylor Swift (featuring Brendon Urie of Panic! at the Disco) — "Me!"**; Ariana Grande — "Thank U, Next"; Billie Eilish — "Bad Guy"; Lil Nas X (featuring Billy Ray Cyrus) — "Old Town Road (Remix)"; Rosalía and J Balvin (featuring El Guincho) – "Con Altura"
Best Collaboration	Best Artist
**Rosalía and J Balvin (featuring El Guincho) – "Con Altura"**; BTS and Halsey — "Boy with Luv"; Lil Nas X (featuring Billy Ray Cyrus) — "Old Town Road (Remix)"; Mark Ronson (featuring Miley Cyrus) — "Nothing Breaks Like a Heart"; Shawn Mendes and Camila Cabello — "Señorita"; The Chainsmokers and Bebe Rexha — "Call You Mine"	**Shawn Mendes**; Ariana Grande; J Balvin; Miley Cyrus; Taylor Swift
Best Group	Best New
**BTS**; 5 Seconds of Summer; Blackpink; CNCO; Jonas Brothers; Little Mix; Monsta X; The 1975	**Billie Eilish**; Ava Max; Lewis Capaldi; Lil Nas X; Lizzo; Mabel
Best Pop	Best Electronic
**Halsey**; Ariana Grande; Becky G; Camila Cabello; Jonas Brothers; Shawn Mendes	**Martin Garrix**; Calvin Harris; DJ Snake; Marshmello; The Chainsmokers
Best Rock	Best Alternative
**Green Day**; Imagine Dragons; Liam Gallagher; Panic! at the Disco; The 1975	**FKA Twigs**; Lana Del Rey; Solange; Twenty One Pilots; Vampire Weekend
Best Hip-Hop	Best Live
**Nicki Minaj**; 21 Savage; Cardi B; J. Cole; Travis Scott	**BTS**; Ariana Grande; Ed Sheeran; Pink; Travis Scott
Best World Stage	Best Push
**Muse**; Bebe Rexha; Hailee Steinfeld; The 1975; Twenty One Pilots	**Ava Max**; Billie Eilish; CNCO; H.E.R.; Jade Bird; Juice Wrld; Kiana Ledé; Lauv; Lewis Capaldi; Lizzo; Mabel; Rosalía
Biggest Fans	Best Look
**BTS**; Ariana Grande; Billie Eilish; Shawn Mendes; Taylor Swift	**Halsey**; J Balvin; Lil Nas X; Lizzo; Rosalía
Generation Change
**Alfredo "Danger" Martinez**; **Shiden Tekle**; **Lisa Ranran Hu**; **Kelvin Doe**; **Jamie Margolin**
Rock Icon
**Liam Gallagher**

== Regional nominations ==
Winners are in bold text.

Europe
Best Belgian Act	Best Danish Act
**MATTN**; Blackwave.; IBE; Tamino; Zwangere Guy	**Nicklas Sahl**; Christopher; Gilli; Lukas Graham; MØ
Best Dutch Act	Best Finnish Act
**Snelle**; Josylvio; Maan; Nielson; Yung Felix	**JVG**; Alma; Benjamin; Gettomasa; Robin Packalen
Best French Act	Best German Act
**Kendji Girac**; Aya Nakamura; Dadju; DJ Snake; Soprano	**Juju**; AnnenMayKantereit; Luciano; Marteria and Casper; Rammstein
Best Hungarian Act	Best Italian Act
**Viktor Király**; Hősök; Jumodaddy; András Kállay-Saunders; Mörk	**Mahmood**; Coez; Elettra Lamborghini; Elodie; Salmo
Best Norwegian Act	Best Polish Act
**Sigrid**; Alan Walker; Astrid S; Kygo; Ruben	**Roksana Węgiel**; Bass Astral x Igo; Daria Zawiałow; Dawid Podsiadło; Sarsa
Best Portuguese Act	Best Russian Act
**Fernando Daniel**; David Carreira; Plutónio; ProfJam; TAY	**Maruv**; Face; Little Big; Noize MC; Zivert
Best Spanish Act	Best Swedish Act
**Lola Indigo**; Amaral; Anni B Sweet; Beret; Carolina Durante	**Avicii**; Jireel; Zara Larsson; Molly Sandén; Robyn
Best Swiss Act	Best UK & Ireland Act
**Loredana**; Stefanie Heinzmann; Ilira; Monet192; Faber	**Little Mix**; Lewis Capaldi; Dave; Mabel; Ed Sheeran
Africa
Best African Act
**Burna Boy**; Harmonize; Nasty C; Prince Kaybee; Teni; Toofan
Asia
Best Greater China Act	Best Indian Act
**Zhou Shen**; Click#15; Fiona Sit; Shin; Timmy Xu; Feng Timo	**Emiway Bantai**; Komorebi; Parikrama; Prateek Kuhad; Raja Kumari
Best Japanese Act	Best Korean Act
**King Gnu**; Chai; Chanmina; Nulbarich; Tempalay	**Ateez**; AB6IX; CIX; Itzy; Iz*One
Best Southeast Asian Act	
**Jasmine Sokko**; Jannine Weigel; Moira Dela Torre; Rich Brian; Suboi; Yuna	
Australia and New Zealand
Best Australian Act	Best New Zealand Act
**Ruel**; Dean Lewis; Mallrat; Sampa the Great; Tones and I	**JessB**; Benee; Broods; Drax Project; Kings
Americas
Best Brazilian Act	Best Canadian Act
**Pabllo Vittar**; Anitta; Emicida; Kevin O Chris; Ludmilla	**Johnny Orlando**; Alessia Cara; Avril Lavigne; Carly Rae Jepsen; Shawn Mendes
Best Caribbean Act	Best Latin America North Act
**Anuel AA**; Bad Bunny; Daddy Yankee; Ozuna; Pedro Capó	**Mon Laferte**; Ed Maverick; Jesse & Joy; Reik; Ximena Sariñana
Best Latin America Central Act	Best Latin America South Act
**Sebastián Yatra**; J Balvin; Maluma; Mau y Ricky; Piso 21	**J Mena**; Cazzu; Lali; Paulo Londra; Tini
Best US Act	
**Taylor Swift**; Ariana Grande; Billie Eilish; Lil Nas X; Lizzo	

== Most wins and nominations ==
=== Most wins ===
Artist(s)	Wins
BTS	3
Taylor Swift	2
Billie Eilish	2
Halsey	2

=== Most nominations ===
Artist(s)	Nominations
Ariana Grande	7
Billie Eilish	6
Lil Nas X	6
Shawn Mendes	6

== See also ==
- 2019 MTV Video Music Awards
