= 2020 MTV Europe Music Awards =

Awards

- Date: 8 November 2020
- Location: Breakfast Television Centre, London, United Kingdom
- Hosted by: Little Mix
- Most wins: BTS (4)
- Most nominations: Lady Gaga (7)
- Website: mtvema.com

Television/radio coverage
- Network: MTV (International); Channel 5 (UK); 10 Shake (AUS); VH1 India and Voot Select (IND)
- Runtime: 120 minutes
- Produced by: Bruce Gilmer; Richard Godfrey; Debbie Phillips; Chloe Mason

The 2020 MTV Europe Music Awards were held on 8 November 2020 at the Breakfast Television Centre in London. The ceremony was hosted by Little Mix, making them the first group ever to host; however, only three members -- Perrie Edwards, Leigh-Anne Pinnock and Jade Thirlwall, appeared; Jesy Nelson did not participate for health reasons. In similar fashion to its American counterpart held earlier in August, the performances were filmed at various locations across Europe and the world due to the ongoing COVID-19 pandemic. The two-hour long show was broadcast in 180 countries.

Lady Gaga was the most nominated artist with seven nominations to her name, followed by BTS and Justin Bieber with five each. BTS was the most awarded act of the ceremony, claiming awards in four of the five categories they were nominated in. Three new categories were introduced that year: Best Latin, Video for Good, and Best Virtual Live.

== Performances ==
List of musical performances
Artist(s)	Song(s)
Pre-show
Why Don't We	"Fallin' (Adrenaline)"
Madison Beer	"Baby"
24kGoldn; Iann Dior	"Mood"
Main show
Doja Cat	"Say So"
Jack Harlow	"Tyler Herro" "What's Poppin"
Sam Smith	"Diamonds"
David Guetta and Raye	"Let's Love"
Maluma and Aya Nakamura	"Djadja" "Hawái"
DaBaby	"Rockstar" "Blind" "Practice"
Little Mix	"Sweet Melody"
Alicia Keys	"Love Looks Better"
Tate McRae	"You Broke Me First"
Karol G	"Bichota"
Yungblud	"Cotton Candy" "Strawberry Lipstick"
Zara Larsson	"Wow"

Little Mix's performance was filmed in London and incorporated "augmented reality and a contortionist". French DJ David Guetta held the premiere performance of his single "Let's Love" live from a pool at the Széchenyi Bath complex in Budapest, Hungary; British singer Raye featured in Sia's place. Both artists were "immersed in a waterfall" of laser lights. English singer Yungblud wore a women's tennis outfit for his performance and assumed the role of "Cupid", flying around the venue of London's Roundhouse and pretending to "shoot arrows at unsuspecting lovers". After reuniting with his band on the ground, in a "giant red spikey inflatable", he ripped off his white skirt to reveal Union Jack shorts.

== Appearances ==
- Becca Dudley – Pre-show co-host
- Jamila Mustafa – Pre-show co-host
- Anitta – presented Best Video
- Bebe Rexha – presented Best Artist
- Madison Beer – presented Best Song
- Rita Ora – presented Best Electronic
- Roman Reigns – presented Best Pop
- Winnie Harlow – presented Best Latin
- Anne-Marie – presented Best New & Best Group
- Big Sean – presented Best Hip-Hop
- Lewis Hamilton – presented Video for Good
- DJ Khaled – introduced Maluma & Aya Nakamura and Karol G
- Dave Grohl from Foo Fighters – introduced Yungblud
- Barbara Palvin – presented from Budapest
- BTS - appeared through a pre-recorded message accepting Best Song and Best Group
- David Guetta appeared through a pre-recorded message accepting Best Electronic
- Karol G appeared through a pre-recorded message accepting Best Latin and Best Collaboration
- Chris Martin from Coldplay appeared through a pre-recorded message accepting Best Rock
- Hayley Williams from Paramore appeared through a pre-recorded message accepting Best Alternative
- Doja Cat appeared through a pre-recorded message accepting Best New

== Awards ==
Voting for select categories began on 6 October on the official MTV EMA website and ended on 2 November. Winners are listed first and highlighted in bold.

Best Song	Best Video
**BTS — "Dynamite"**; DaBaby (featuring Roddy Ricch) — "Rockstar"; Dua Lipa — "Don't Start Now"; Lady Gaga and Ariana Grande – "Rain on Me"; Roddy Ricch — "The Box"; The Weeknd – "Blinding Lights"	**DJ Khaled** (**featuring Drake**) **— "Popstar"**; Billie Eilish — "Everything I Wanted"; Cardi B (featuring Megan Thee Stallion) — "WAP"; Karol G (featuring Nicki Minaj) — "Tusa"; Lady Gaga and Ariana Grande – "Rain on Me"; Taylor Swift – "The Man"; The Weeknd – "Blinding Lights"
Best Collaboration	Best Artist
**Karol G (featuring Nicki Minaj) — "Tusa"**; Blackpink and Selena Gomez – "Ice Cream"; Cardi B (featuring Megan Thee Stallion) — "WAP"; DaBaby (featuring Roddy Ricch) — "Rockstar"; Justin Bieber (featuring Quavo) — "Intentions"; Lady Gaga and Ariana Grande – "Rain on Me"; Sam Smith and Demi Lovato – "I'm Ready"	**Lady Gaga**; Dua Lipa; Harry Styles; Justin Bieber; Miley Cyrus; The Weeknd
Best Group	Best New
**BTS**; 5 Seconds of Summer; Blackpink; Chloe x Halle; CNCO; Little Mix	**Doja Cat**; Benee; DaBaby; Jack Harlow; Roddy Ricch; Yungblud
Best Pop	Best Electronic
**Little Mix**; BTS; Dua Lipa; Harry Styles; Justin Bieber; Katy Perry; Lady Gaga	**David Guetta**; Calvin Harris; Kygo; Marshmello; Martin Garrix; The Chainsmokers
Best Rock	Best Alternative
**Coldplay**; Green Day; Liam Gallagher; Pearl Jam; Tame Impala; The Killers	**Hayley Williams**; Blackbear; FKA Twigs; Machine Gun Kelly; Twenty One Pilots; The 1975
Best Hip-Hop	Best Latin
**Cardi B**; DaBaby; Drake; Eminem; Megan Thee Stallion; Roddy Ricch; Travis Scott	**Karol G**; Anuel AA; Bad Bunny; J Balvin; Maluma; Ozuna
Best Virtual Live	Best Push
**BTS**; J Balvin; Katy Perry; Little Mix; Maluma; Post Malone	**Yungblud**; AJ Mitchell; Ashnikko; Benee; Brockhampton; Conan Gray; Doja Cat; Georgia; Jack Harlow; Lil Tecca; Tate McRae; Wallows
Biggest Fans	Video for Good
**BTS**; Ariana Grande; Blackpink; Justin Bieber; Lady Gaga; Taylor Swift	**H.E.R. — "I Can't Breathe"**; Anderson .Paak — "Lockdown"; David Guetta and Sia — "Let's Love"; Demi Lovato — "I Love Me"; Jorja Smith — "By Any Means"; Lil Baby — "The Bigger Picture"
Generation Change
**Luiza Brasil**; **Kiki Mordi**; **Temi Mwale**; **Catherhea Potjanaporn**; **Raquel Willis**

== Regional awards ==
Best Regional Act winners were announced by Johnny Orlando via a live stream posted on the official MTV EMA Facebook page. Winners are listed first and highlighted in bold.

Europe
Best Belgian Act	Best Dutch Act
**Angèle**; IBE; Blackwave.; OT; Lost Frequencies	**Emma Heesters**; Davina Michelle; Tabitha; Bilal Wahib; Suzan & Freek
Best French Act	Best German Act
**Matt Pokora**; Soprano; Slimane et Vitaa; GIMS; Aya Nakamura	**Fynn Kliemann**; Apache 207; Lea; Nico Santos; Shirin David
Best Hungarian Act	Best Israeli Act
**Dzsúdló**; Irie Maffia; ByeAlex; Viktoria Metzker; Carson Coma	**Noa Kirel**; Carakukly; Eden Hason; Noga Erez; Noroz and Boi Ecchi
Best Italian Act	Best Nordic Act
**Diodato**; Elettra Lamborghini; Levante; Irama; Random	**Zara Larsson**; Branco; Gilli; Alma; Kygo
Best Polish Act	Best Portuguese Act
**Margaret**; Quebonafide; Krzysztof Zalewski; Daria Zawiałow; sanah	**Fernando Daniel**; Bárbara Bandeira; Diogo Piçarra; Bispo; Dino D'Santiago
Best Russian Act	Best Spanish Act
**Niletto**; Cream Soda; Morgenshtern; Klava Coca; Manizha	**La La Love You**; Leiva; Don Patricio; Aitana; Carolina Durante
Best Swiss Act	Best UK & Ireland Act
**Loredana**; Seven; Bligg; Loco Escrito; Pronto	**Little Mix**; Dave; Dua Lipa; Harry Styles; Stormzy
Africa
Best African Act
**Master KG**; Burna Boy; Rema; Kabza De Small and DJ Maphorisa; Sheebah; Gaz Mawete
Asia
Best Greater China Act	Best Indian Act
**R1SE**; AGA; Feng Timo; Waa Wei; Timmy Xu	**Armaan Malik**; Divine; Kaam Bhaari; Prabh Deep; Siri & Sez on the Beat
Best Japanese Act	Best Korean Act
**Official Hige Dandism**; Hiraidai; Punpee; Rei; Yorushika	**Stray Kids**; Astro; Everglow; Kard; Victon
Best Southeast Asian Act	
**Jack (J97)**; Agnez Mo; Benjamin Kheng; Ben&Ben; K-Clique; Violette Wautier	
Australia and New Zealand
Best Australian Act	Best New Zealand Act
**G Flip**; Baker Boy; Hayden James; The Kid Laroi; Tones and I	**Benee**; Baynk; Jawsh 685; L.A.B.; The Naked and Famous
Americas
Best Brazilian Act	Best Canadian Act
**Pabllo Vittar**; Anitta; Djonga; Emicida; Ludmilla	**Johnny Orlando**; Alessia Cara; The Weeknd; Justin Bieber; Jessie Reyez
Best Caribbean Act	Best Latin America North Act
**Bad Bunny**; Anuel AA; Ozuna; Residente; Rauw Alejandro	**Danna Paola**; Matisse; Jesse & Joy; Sofía Reyes; Zoé
Best Latin America Central Act	Best Latin America South Act
**Sebastián Yatra**; Camilo; J Balvin; Karol G; Maluma	**Lali**; Cazzu; Khea; Nicki Nicole; Tini
Best US Act	
**Lady Gaga**; Cardi B; Megan Thee Stallion; Miley Cyrus; Taylor Swift	
