= MTV Europe Music Award for Global Icon =

Award

The following is a list of the MTV Europe Music Award winners for Global Icon.

== 2010s ==
Year	Winner	Ref
2010	Bon Jovi	
2011	Queen	
2012	Whitney Houston	
2013	Eminem	
2014	Ozzy Osbourne	
2015	Duran Duran ^{[a]}	
2016	Green Day	
2017	U2	
2018	Janet Jackson	
2019	Liam Gallagher ^{[b]}	

== 2020s ==
Year	Winner	Ref
2024	Busta Rhymes	

^{^[a]}Video Visionary Award.
^{^[b]}Rock Icon Award.
