= 2024 MTV Europe Music Awards =

31st edition of the MTV Europe Music Awards held in 2024

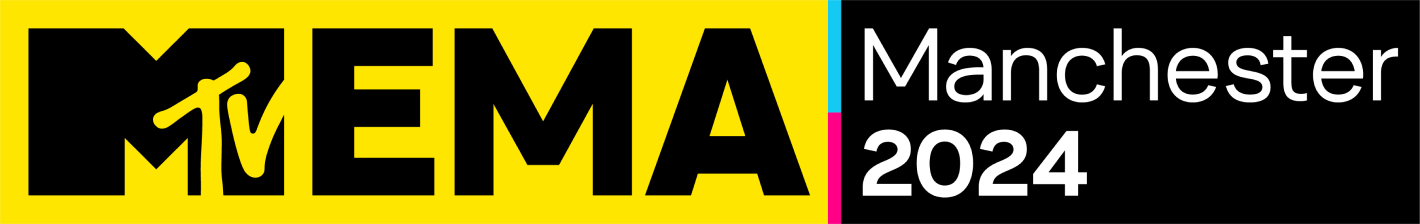
- Date: 10 November 2024
- Venue: Co-op Live, Manchester, United Kingdom
- Hosted by: Rita Ora
- Most wins: Taylor Swift (4)
- Most nominations: Taylor Swift (7)
- Website: mtvema.com

Television/radio coverage
- Network: Paramount International Networks; MTV (International); Pluto TV

The 2024 MTV Europe Music Awards were held on 10 November 2024 at the Co-op Live in Manchester, United Kingdom. This marks the seventh time the award show is being held in the United Kingdom.

British singer Rita Ora hosted the show for a third time, beating the two-time hosting record set by Katy Perry (in 2008 and 2009), Sacha Baron Cohen (2001 as Ali G and 2005 as Borat Sagdiyev) and Ronan Keating (1997 and 1999). She previously hosted the 2017 awards and also co-hosted the 2022 awards with her husband, New Zealand director, producer, screenwriter and actor Taika Waititi.

== Performers ==
The first round of performers were announced on 22 October 2024. The second round of performers were announced on 30 October 2024.

Artist(s)	Song(s)
Main show
Benson Boone	"Slow It Down" "Beautiful Things"
Tyla	"Water" "Push 2 Start"
The Warning	"Automatic Sun"
Raye	"Escapism" "Oscar Winning Tears" "Body Dysmorphia"
Shawn Mendes	"Heart of Gold"
Teddy Swims	"The Door" "Lose Control"
Busta Rhymes	"Scenario" "Put Your Hands Where My Eyes Could See" "I Know What You Want" "Do the Busabus Pt. 2" "Break Ya Neck" "Look at Me Now" "Touch It" "Pass the Courvoisier, Part II"
Le Sserafim	"Chasing Lightning" "Crazy"
Peso Pluma; Estevan Plazola	"Hollywood"
Pet Shop Boys	"All The Young Dudes" "West End Girls"

== Presenters ==
The presenters were announced on 8 November 2024.

- Rúben Dias and Alex Greenwood – presented Best New
- Neneh Cherry and Mabel – presented Best Hip-Hop
- Jodie Turner-Smith – presented Best Latin
- Little Simz – presented Global Icon to Busta Rhymes
- Olly Alexander – presented Best Song
- LL Cool J – presented Best Afrobeats
- Gavin Rossdale – presented Best Video
- Rita Ora – spoke about the death of Liam Payne
- Aaron Taylor-Johnson – presented Pop Pioneers to Pet Shop Boys

== Winners and nominees ==
The nominees were revealed officially by MTV on 8 October 2024. Taylor Swift led the nominations with seven, making her the most nominated artist. Swift was followed by Ariana Grande, Billie Eilish, Charli XCX and Sabrina Carpenter, who all got five nominations each.

Winners are listed first and are bolded.

Best Song	Best Video
**Sabrina Carpenter – "Espresso"**; Ariana Grande – "We Can't Be Friends (Wait for Your Love)"; Benson Boone – "Beautiful Things"; Beyoncé – "Texas Hold 'Em"; Billie Eilish – "Birds of a Feather"; Chappell Roan – "Good Luck, Babe!"	**Taylor Swift featuring Post Malone – "Fortnight"**; Ariana Grande – "We Can't Be Friends (Wait for Your Love)"; Charli XCX – "360"; Eminem – "Houdini"; Kendrick Lamar – "Not Like Us"; Lisa featuring Rosalía – "New Woman"
Best Artist	Best Collaboration
**Taylor Swift**; Beyoncé; Billie Eilish; Post Malone; Raye; Sabrina Carpenter	**Lisa featuring Rosalía – "New Woman"**; Charli XCX featuring Billie Eilish – "Guess"; Future, Metro Boomin and Kendrick Lamar – "Like That"; Lady Gaga, Bruno Mars – "Die with a Smile"; Peso Pluma and Anitta – "Bellakeo"; Taylor Swift featuring Post Malone – "Fortnight"
Best New	Best Pop
**Benson Boone**; Ayra Starr; Chappell Roan; Le Sserafim; Teddy Swims; The Last Dinner Party; Tyla	**Ariana Grande**; Billie Eilish; Camila Cabello; Charli XCX; Dua Lipa; Sabrina Carpenter; Taylor Swift
Best Rock	Best Alternative
**Liam Gallagher**; Bon Jovi; Coldplay; Green Day; Kings of Leon; Lenny Kravitz; The Killers	**Imagine Dragons**; Fontaines D.C.; Hozier; Lana Del Rey; Twenty One Pilots; Yungblud
Best Electronic	Best Hip-Hop
**Calvin Harris**; David Guetta; Disclosure; DJ Snake; Fred Again; Swedish House Mafia	**Eminem**; Central Cee; Kendrick Lamar; Megan Thee Stallion; Nicki Minaj; Travis Scott
Best R&B	Best Latin
**Tyla**; Kehlani; SZA; Tinashe; Usher; Victoria Monét	**Peso Pluma**; Anitta; Bad Bunny; Karol G; Rauw Alejandro; Shakira
Best K-Pop	Best Afrobeats
**Jimin**; Jungkook; Le Sserafim; Lisa; NewJeans; Stray Kids	**Tyla**; Asake; Ayra Starr; Burna Boy; Rema; Tems
Best Live	Best Push
**Taylor Swift**; Adele; Coldplay; Doja Cat; Raye; Travis Scott	**Le Sserafim**; Ayra Starr; Chappell Roan; Coco Jones; Flyana Boss; Jessie Murph; Laufey; Mark Ambor; Shaboozey; Teddy Swims; The Warning; Victoria Monét
Biggest Fans
**Lisa**; Anitta; Ariana Grande; Beyoncé; Billie Eilish; Chappell Roan; Charli XCX; Katy Perry; Nicki Minaj; Sabrina Carpenter; Shawn Mendes; Taylor Swift

=== Special awards ===
Global Icon	Pop Pioneers
Busta Rhymes	Pet Shop Boys

=== Regional awards ===
Europe
Best Austrian Act	Best Dutch Act
**RAF Camora**; Bilderbuch; Christina Stürmer; Esther Graf; Money Boy; Wanda	**Roxy Dekker**; Claude; Jonna Fraser; Mr. Belt & Wezol; Son Mieux
Best French Act	Best German Act
**Pierre Garnier**; Aya Nakamura; Dadju & Tayc; Gims; Slimane; Vitaa	**Ayliva**; K.I.Z; Luciano; Pashanim; Shirin David
Best Israeli Act	Best Italian Act
**Noa Kirel**; Agam Buhbut; Anna Zak; Shahar Saul; Shahar Tavoch	**Annalisa**; Angelina Mango; Ghali; Mahmood; The Kolors
Best Nordics Act	Best Polish Act
**Zara Larsson (Sweden)**; Alesso (Sweden); Girl in Red (Norway); Laufey (Iceland); Swedish House Mafia (Sweden)	**Daria Zawiałow**; Kacperczyk; Kwiat Jabłoni; PRO8L3M; Zalewski
Best Portuguese Act	Best Spanish Act
**Bárbara Bandeira**; Bárbara Tinoco; Dillaz; Ivandro; Slow J	**Lola Índigo**; Ana Mena; Belén Aguilera; Dani Fernández; Mikel Izal
Best Swiss Act	Best UK & Ireland Act
**Nemo**; Benjamin Amaru; Faber; Priya Ragu; Stress	**Raye (UK)**; Central Cee (UK); Charli XCX (UK); Chase & Status (UK); Dua Lipa (UK); Hozier (Ireland)
Africa
Best African Act
**Tyla (South Africa)**; Asake (Nigeria); Ayra Starr (Nigeria); DBN Gogo (South Africa); Diamond Platnumz (Tanzania); TitoM & Yuppe (South Africa)
Asia
Best Indian Act	Best Asia Act
**Mali**; Armaan Malik; Chirag Todi; Dee MC & EPR; Hanumankind; Kamakshi Khanna	**Bini (Philippines)**; Illit (South Korea); Mahalini (Indonesia); Masdo (Malaysia); Sakurazaka46 (Japan)
Australia & New Zealand
Best Australian Act
**Sia**; Confidence Man; CYRIL; Kylie Minogue; The Kid Laroi; Troye Sivan
Americas
Best Brazilian Act	Best Canadian Act
**Pabllo Vittar**; Jão; Luísa Sonza; Matuê; Pedro Sampaio	**Shawn Mendes**; AR Paisley; Kaytranada; Nelly Furtado; Tate McRae
Best Caribbean Act	Best Latin America North Act
**Young Miko**; Eladio Carrión; Luar La L; Myke Towers; Yovngchimi	**YeriMua**; Danna; El Malilla; Gabito Ballesteros; Natanael Cano
Best Latin America Central Act	Best Latin America South Act
**Manuel Turizo**; Beéle; Blessd; Kapo; Sofia Castro	**Dillom**; Emilia; Luck Ra; María Becerra; Trueno
Best US Act
**Taylor Swift**; Ariana Grande; Beyoncé; Kendrick Lamar; Sabrina Carpenter
