= MTV Europe Music Award for Best US Act =

Category of MTV Europe Music Awards

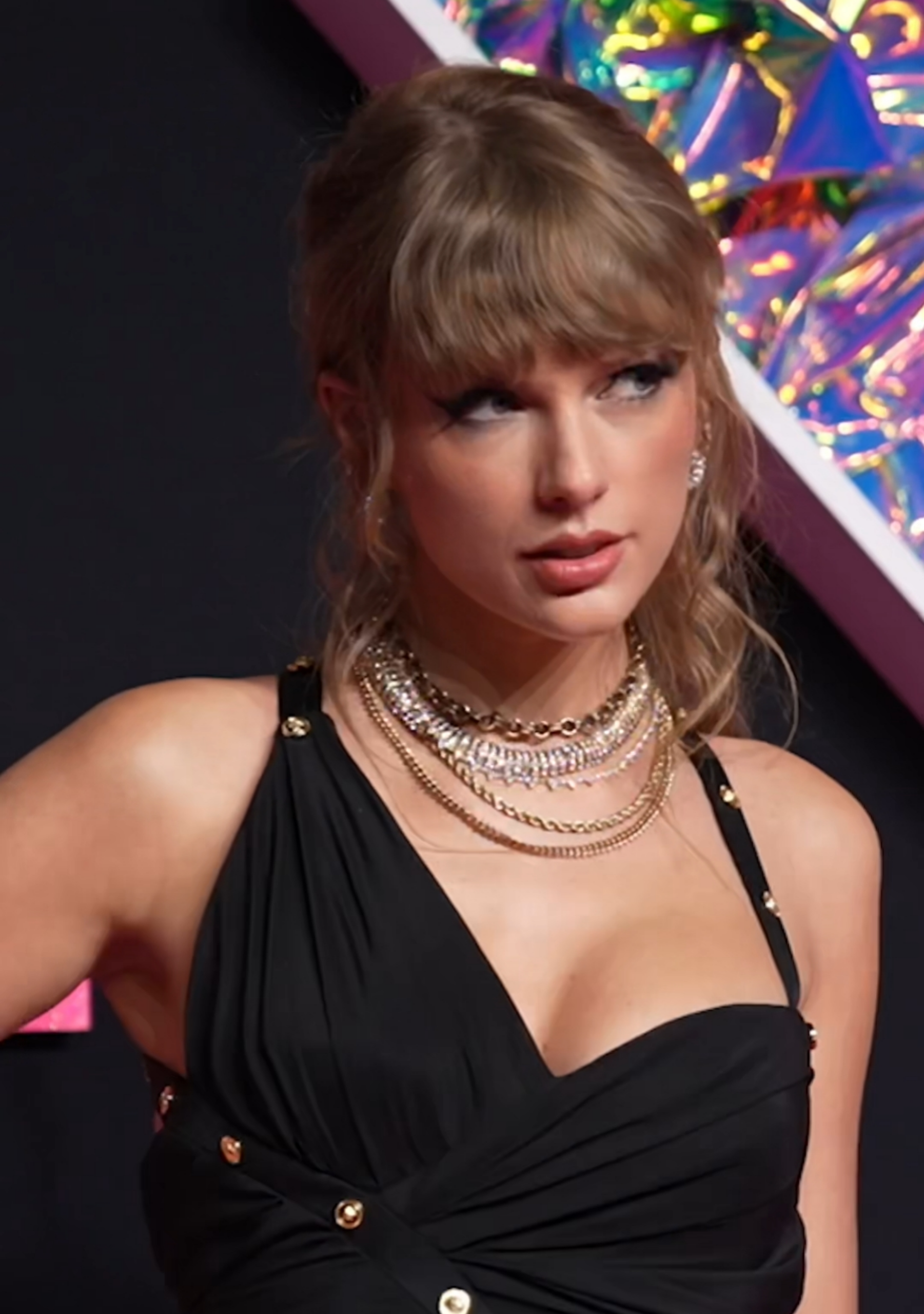
- 2024 winner Taylor Swift has won the award 4 times and has been nominated for the award 7 times.
- Country: Europe
- Presented by: MTV
- First award: 2012
- Currently held by: Taylor Swift (2024)

Highlights
- Most wins: Taylor Swift (4)
- Website: ema.mtv.tv/

The MTV Europe Music Award for Best US Act is an award that has been given out since 2012. The all-time winner in this category is Taylor Swift with 4 wins. Swift is also the most nominated artist with 7 nominations.

== Winners and nominees ==
Winners are listed first and highlighted in bold.

=== 2010s ===
Year	Artist	Ref
2012
2012	**MGK**	
2012	2 Chainz	
2012	ASAP Rocky	
2012	Big Sean	
2012	Mac Miller	
2012	Tyga	
2013
2013	**Miley Cyrus**	
2013	Bruno Mars	
2013	Justin Timberlake	
2013	Macklemore & Ryan Lewis	
2013	Robin Thicke	
2014
2014	**Fifth Harmony**	
2014	Beyoncé	
2014	Eminem	
2014	Katy Perry	
2014	Pharrell Williams	
2014	Pre-nominations: Demi Lovato; Ariana Grande; Trey Songz; Austin Mahone	
2015
2015	**Taylor Swift**	
2015	Beyoncé	
2015	Kendrick Lamar	
2015	Nick Jonas	
2015	Nicki Minaj	
2016
2016	**Ariana Grande**	
2016	Beyoncé	
2016	Charlie Puth	
2016	Kanye West	
2016	Twenty One Pilots	
2016	Pre-nominations: Bryson Tiller; DNCE; Future; Halsey	
2017
2017	**Fifth Harmony**	
2017	Bruno Mars	
2017	DJ Khaled	
2017	Kendrick Lamar	
2017	Taylor Swift	
2018
2018	**Camila Cabello**	
2018	Ariana Grande	
2018	Cardi B	
2018	Post Malone	
2018	Imagine Dragons	
2019
2019	**Taylor Swift**	
2019	Billie Eilish	
2019	Lil Nas X	
2019	Lizzo	
2019	Ariana Grande	

=== 2020s ===
Year	Artist	Ref
2020
2020	**Lady Gaga**	
2020	Cardi B	
2020	Megan Thee Stallion	
2020	Miley Cyrus	
2020	Taylor Swift	
2021
2021	**Taylor Swift**	
2021	Ariana Grande	
2021	Doja Cat	
2021	Lil Nas X	
2021	Olivia Rodrigo	
2022
2022	**Billie Eilish**	
2022	Doja Cat	
2022	Jack Harlow	
2022	Lil Nas X	
2022	Lizzo	
2022	Taylor Swift	
2023
2023	**Nicki Minaj**	
2023	Doja Cat	
2023	Olivia Rodrigo	
2023	SZA	
2023	Taylor Swift	
2024
2024	**Taylor Swift**	
2024	Ariana Grande	
2024	Beyoncé	
2024	Kendrick Lamar	
2024	Sabrina Carpenter	
