= MTV Europe Music Award for Best Hip Hop =

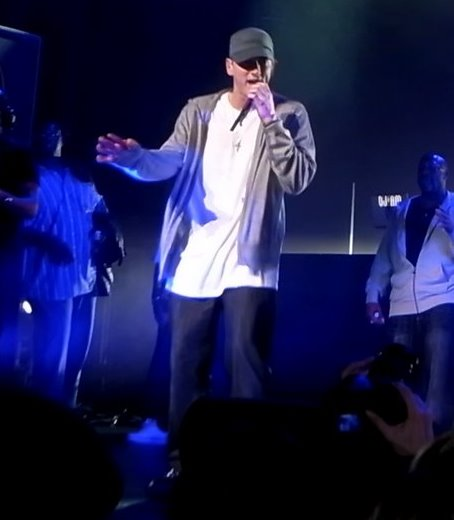
Eminem has won this award ten times, more than any one else

The MTV Europe Music Award for Best Hip Hop has been awarded since 1997. Originally entitled Best Rap, the award was renamed to its current title in 1999. Eminem has won this award ten times, followed by Nicki Minaj with eight times.

== Winners and nominees ==
Winners are listed first and highlighted in bold.

† indicates an MTV Video Music Award for Best Hip Hop Video–winning artist.
‡ indicates an MTV Video Music Award for Best Hip Hop Video–nominated artist that same year.

=== 1990s ===
Year	Artist	Ref
1997
1997	**Will Smith**	
1997	Blackstreet	
1997	Coolio	
1997	Puff Daddy	
1997	The Notorious B.I.G.	
1998
1998	**Beastie Boys**	
1998	Puff Daddy	
1998	Missy Elliott	
1998	Pras	
1998	Busta Rhymes	
1999
1999	**Eminem**	
1999	Beastie Boys †	
1999	Busta Rhymes ‡	
1999	Puff Daddy	
1999	Will Smith	

=== 2000s ===
Year	Artist	Ref
2000
2000	**Eminem**	
2000	Dr. Dre	
2000	Cypress Hill	
2000	Wyclef Jean	
2000	Busta Rhymes	
2001
2001	**Eminem**	
2001	D12	
2001	Missy Elliott ‡	
2001	Outkast †	
2001	P. Diddy	
2002
2002	**Eminem**	
2002	Nelly	
2002	P. Diddy	
2002	Busta Rhymes	
2002	Ja Rule ‡	
2003
2003	**Eminem**	
2003	50 Cent	
2003	Missy Elliott †	
2003	Jay Z ‡	
2003	Nelly ‡	
2004
2004	**D12**	
2004	Beastie Boys	
2004	Jay Z	
2004	Nelly ‡	
2004	Kanye West ‡	
2005
2005	**Snoop Dogg ‡**	
2005	50 Cent	
2005	Akon	
2005	Missy Elliott †	
2005	Kanye West ‡	
2006
2006	**Kanye West ‡**	
2006	Missy Elliott	
2006	Sean Paul	
2006	Diddy	
2006	Busta Rhymes	

=== 2010s ===
Year	Artist	Ref
2010
2010	**Eminem †**	
2010	Snoop Dogg	
2010	T.I.	
2010	Lil Wayne	
2010	Kanye West ‡	
2011
2011	**Eminem**	
2011	Lil Wayne ‡	
2011	Jay Z and Kanye West	
2011	Pitbull	
2011	Snoop Dogg	
2012
2012	**Nicki Minaj ‡**	
2012	Drake †	
2012	Jay Z and Kanye West ‡	
2012	Nas	
2012	Rick Ross	
2013
2013	**Eminem**	
2013	Drake ‡	
2013	Jay Z	
2013	Macklemore and Ryan Lewis †	
2013	Kanye West	
2014
2014	**Nicki Minaj**	
2014	Drake †	
2014	Eminem ‡	
2014	Iggy Azalea	
2014	Kanye West ‡	
2015
2015	**Nicki Minaj †**	
2015	Drake	
2015	Kendrick Lamar ‡	
2015	Kanye West	
2015	Wiz Khalifa ‡	
2016
2016	**Drake †**	
2016	Future	
2016	G-Eazy	
2016	Kanye West	
2016	Wiz Khalifa	
2017
2017	**Eminem**	
2017	Drake	
2017	Future	
2017	Kendrick Lamar †	
2017	Post Malone	
2018
2018	**Nicki Minaj †**	
2018	Drake ‡	
2018	Eminem	
2018	Migos ‡	
2018	Travis Scott	
2019
2019	**Nicki Minaj**	
2019	21 Savage ‡	
2019	Cardi B †	
2019	J. Cole	
2019	Travis Scott ‡	

=== 2020s ===
Year	Artist	Ref
2020
2020	**Cardi B**	
2020	DaBaby ‡	
2020	Drake ‡	
2020	Eminem ‡	
2020	Megan Thee Stallion †	
2020	Roddy Ricch ‡	
2020	Travis Scott ‡	
2021
2021	**Nicki Minaj**	
2021	Cardi B ‡	
2021	DJ Khaled	
2021	Drake ‡	
2021	Kanye West	
2021	Megan Thee Stallion ‡	
2022
2022	**Nicki Minaj †**	
2022	Drake ‡	
2022	Future ‡	
2022	Jack Harlow	
2022	Kendrick Lamar ‡	
2022	Lil Baby †	
2022	Megan Thee Stallion	
2023
2023	**Nicki Minaj †**	
2023	Cardi B ‡	
2023	Central Cee	
2023	Lil Wayne ‡	
2023	Lil Uzi Vert ‡	
2023	Metro Boomin ‡	
2023	Travis Scott	
2024
2024	**Eminem †**	
2024	Central Cee	
2024	Kendrick Lamar	
2024	Megan Thee Stallion ‡	
2024	Nicki Minaj	
2024	Travis Scott ‡	

== See also ==
- MTV Video Music Award for Best Hip Hop Video
- MTV Video Music Award for Best Rap Video
