= 2016 MTV Europe Music Awards =

Annual edition of the awards show

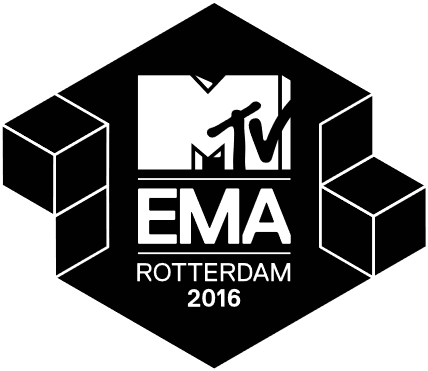
- Date: 6 November 2016
- Location: Rotterdam Ahoy, Rotterdam, Netherlands
- Hosted by: Bebe Rexha
- Most wins: Justin Bieber, Lady Gaga, Martin Garrix, Shawn Mendes, Twenty One Pilots and Zara Larsson (each 2)
- Most nominations: Beyoncé (5)
- Website: mtvema.com

Television/radio coverage
- Network: MTV; Channel 5

The 2016 MTV EMAs (also known as the MTV Europe Music Awards) were held at the Rotterdam Ahoy, in Rotterdam, Netherlands, on 6 November 2016. It was hosted by Bebe Rexha. This was the third time the awards have taken place in the Netherlands, and the second time Rotterdam has been the host city. The awards were held in the same venue as the 1997 MTV EMAs.

== Nominations ==
The nominations were announced on September 27, 2016. Winners are in bold text.

Best Song	Best Video
**Justin Bieber** — **"Sorry"**: Adele — "Hello"; Lukas Graham — "7 Years"; Mike Posner — "I Took a Pill in Ibiza (Seeb Remix)"; Rihanna (featuring Drake) — "Work"	**The Weeknd (featuring Daft Punk) — "Starboy"**: Beyoncé — "Formation"; Coldplay — "Up&Up"; Kanye West — "Famous"; Tame Impala — "The Less I Know the Better"
Best Female	Best Male
**Lady Gaga**: Adele; Beyoncé; Rihanna; Sia	**Shawn Mendes**: Calvin Harris; Drake; Justin Bieber; The Weeknd
Best New	Best Pop
**Zara Larsson**: Bebe Rexha; The Chainsmokers; DNCE; Lukas Graham	**Fifth Harmony**: Selena Gomez; Ariana Grande; Justin Bieber; Rihanna; Shawn Mendes
Best Electronic	Best Rock
**Martin Garrix**: Afrojack; Calvin Harris; David Guetta; Major Lazer	**Coldplay**: Green Day; Metallica; Muse; Red Hot Chili Peppers
Best Alternative	Best Hip-Hop
**Twenty One Pilots**: Kings of Leon; Radiohead; Tame Impala; The 1975	**Drake**: Future; G-Eazy; Kanye West; Wiz Khalifa
Best Live	Best World Stage
**Twenty One Pilots**: Adele; Beyoncé; Coldplay; Green Day	**Martin Garrix**: Duran Duran; Ellie Goulding; Jess Glynne; OneRepublic; Tinie Tempah; Tomorrowland; Wiz Khalifa
Best Push Act	Biggest Fans
**DNCE**: Alessia Cara; Anne-Marie; Bebe Rexha; Blossoms; Charlie Puth; Dua Lipa; Elle King; Halsey; Jack Garratt; Jonas Blue; Lukas Graham	**Justin Bieber**: Ariana Grande; Beyoncé; Lady Gaga; Katy Perry
Best Look	Best Worldwide Act
**Lady Gaga**: Beyoncé; Bebe Rexha; Rihanna; Sia	**Ariana Grande**; **Got7**; **Maluma**; **Shawn Mendes**; **Troye Sivan**; **Wizkid**; **Zara Larsson**
Global Icon
**Green Day**

== Regional nominations ==
Winners are in bold text.

=== Europe ===
Best Adria Act	Best Belgian Act
**S.A.R.S**: Elemental; Luce; Siddharta; Toni Zen	**Emma Bale**: Laura Tesoro; Lost Frequencies; Tourist LeMC; Woodie Smalls
Best Danish Act	Best Dutch Act
**Benjamin Lasnier**: Christopher; Gilli; Lukas Graham; MØ	**Broederliefde**: Douwe Bob; Julian Jordan; Ronnie Flex; Sam Feldt
Best Finnish Act	Best French Act
**Antti Tuisku**: Evelina; Nikke Ankara; Teflon Brothers; Paula Vesala	**Amir**: Frero Delavega; Jain; Maitre Gims; Nekfeu
Best German Act	Best Israeli Act
**Max Giesinger**: Beginner; Robin Schulz; Mark Forster; Topic	**The Ultras**: E-Z; Eliad; Noa Kirel; Static & Ben El Tavori
Best Italian Act	Best Norwegian Act
**Benji & Fede**: Alessandra Amoroso; Emma; Francesca Michielin; Salmo	**Alan Walker**: Astrid S; Aurora; Julie Bergan; Kygo
Best Polish Act	Best Portuguese Act
**Margaret**: Ania Dąbrowska; Bovska; Cleo; Dawid Podsiadło	**David Carreira**: Aurea; Carlão; D.A.M.A; HMB
Best Romanian Act	Best Russian Act
**Andra**: Feli; Manuel Riva; Smiley; Vanotek	**Therr Maitz**: Basta; Elka; Leningrad; OQJAV
Best Spanish Act	Best Swedish Act
**Enrique Bunbury**: Álvaro Soler; Amaral; Corizonas; Leiva	**The Fooo Conspiracy**: Galantis; Laleh; Tove Lo; Zara Larsson
Best Swiss Act	Best UK & Ireland Act
**Chlyklass**: Bastian Baker; Bligg; Damian Lynn; Nickless	**Little Mix**: Adele; Coldplay; Zayn; Years & Years

=== Africa ===
Best African Act

**Ali Kiba**

- Black Coffee
- Cassper Nyovest
- Olamide
- Wizkid

=== Asia ===
Best Chinese and Hong Kong Act	Best Indian Act
**G.E.M.**: Khalil Fong; Momo Wu; Pu Shu; Vision Wei	**Prateek Kuhad**: Anoushka Shankar; Bandish Projekt; Monica Dogra; Uday Benegal & Friends
Best Japanese Act	Best Korean Act
**One Ok Rock**: Kyary Pamyu Pamyu; Perfume; Radwimps; Sheena Ringo	**B.A.P**: Got7; GFriend; Twice; VIXX
Best Southeast Asian Act	
**Dong Nhi**: Bunkface; Gentle Bones; Raisa; Sarah Geronimo; Thaitanium; Yuna	

=== Australia and New Zealand ===
Best Australian Act	Best New Zealand Act
**Troye Sivan**: Flume; Tkay Maidza; The Veronicas; Vance Joy	**Broods**: Kings; Ladyhawke; Maala; Sachi

=== Latin America ===
Best Brazilian Act	Best Latin America North Act
**Anitta**: Karol Conká; Ludmilla; Projota; Tiago Iorc	**Paty Cantú**: CD9; Jesse & Joy; León Larregui; Mon Laferte
Best Latin America Central Act	Best Latin America South Act
**Maluma**: Alkilados; J Balvin; Manuel Medrano; Sebastian Yatra	**Lali**: Babasónicos; Illya Kuryaki and the Valderramas; Será Pánico; Tini

=== North America ===
Best Canadian Act	Best US Act
**Shawn Mendes**: Justin Bieber; Alessia Cara; Drake; The Weeknd	**Ariana Grande**: Beyoncé; Charlie Puth; Kanye West; Twenty One Pilots

== Performances ==
=== Pre show ===
Artist(s)	Song(s)
Pre-show
Anne-Marie	"Alarm"

=== Main show ===
Artist(s)	Song(s)
Main show
Bruno Mars	"24K Magic"
DNCE	"Body Moves" "Cake by the Ocean"
Martin Garrix; Bebe Rexha	"In the Name of Love"
Shawn Mendes	"Mercy"
Zara Larsson	"Lush Life" "Ain't My Fault"
Green Day	"Bang Bang"
The Weeknd	"Starboy"
Kings of Leon	"Waste a Moment"
Bebe Rexha	"I Got You"
Lukas Graham	"You're Not There" "7 Years"
Afrojack	"Gone" "Hey"
OneRepublic	"Let's Hurt Tonight"
Green Day	"American Idiot"

== Appearances ==
=== Pre show ===
- Laura Whitmore and Sway Calloway — Red carpet hosts
- Laura Whitmore — Presented Biggest Fans
- Laura Whitmore and The MTV It Girls — Presented Best Look

=== Main show ===
- G-Eazy and Charli XCX — presented Best Electronic
- Winnie Harlow and Tinie Tempah — presented Best Live
- Jourdan Dunn — presented Best Male
- Jaden Smith — presented Best New Act
- Nina Dobrev and Deepika Padukone — presented Best Video
- Idris Elba — presented Global Icon

== Voting process ==
Category	Voting Method	Start date	End date
Biggest Fans	Twitter, Instagram and Vine Hashtag	27 Sept @12pm CET	N/A
Worldwide Act	Website/App	2 Sept @12pm CET	5 Nov @11:59pm CET*
Best Video	MTV Music Editorial Team - not eligible for audience voting	N/A	N/A
All others	Website/App	12 Sept @12pm CET	5 Nov @11:59pm CET

(*)without Best Acts from Netherlands, Belgium, Switzerland, Israel and Poland. In those countries voting was ended earlier.

== See also ==
- 2016 MTV Video Music Awards
