= 2018 MTV Europe Music Awards =

Music award

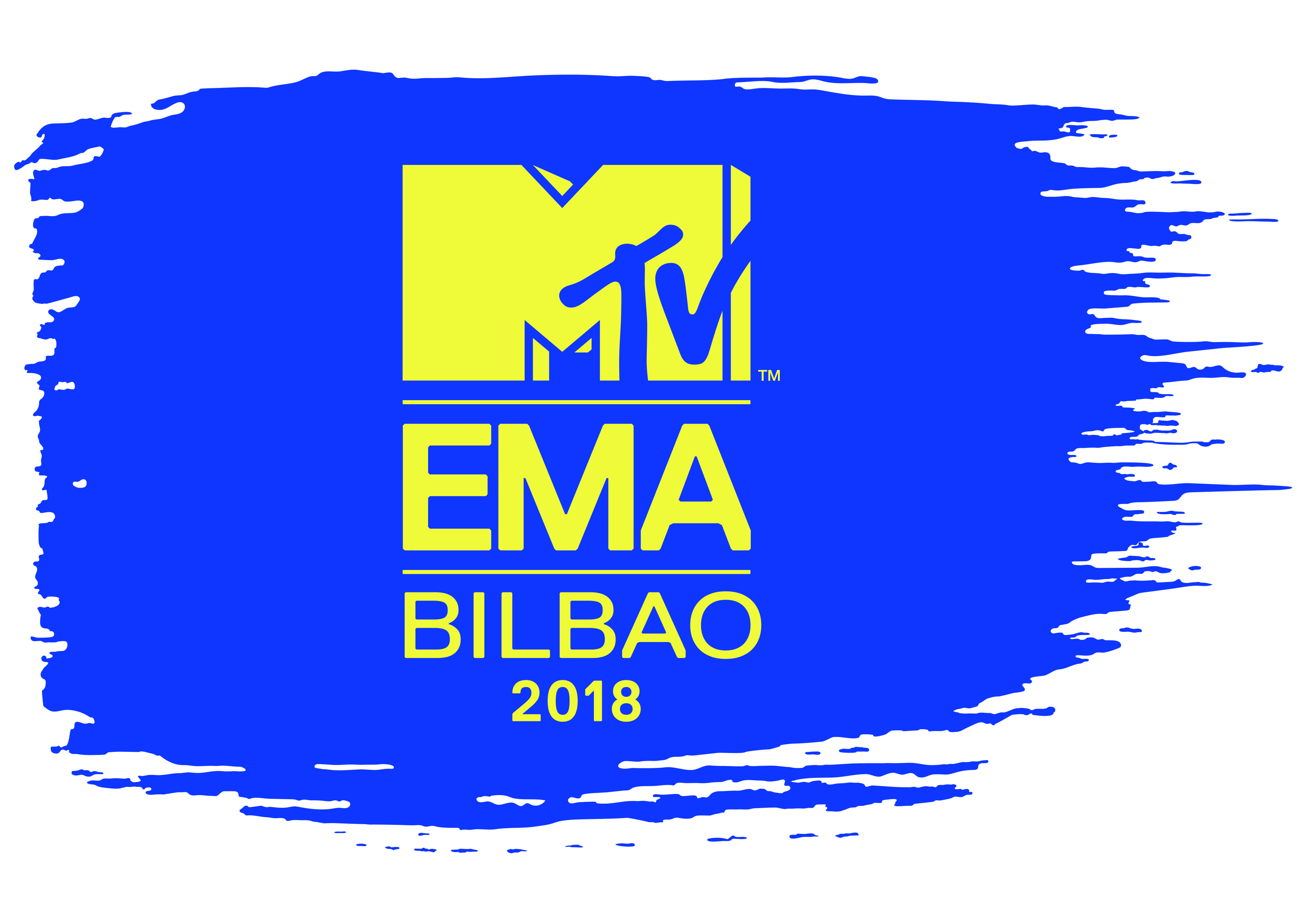
- Date: 4 November 2018
- Location: Bizkaia Arena, Barakaldo, Basque Country, Spain
- Hosted by: Hailee Steinfeld
- Most wins: Camila Cabello (4)
- Most nominations: Camila Cabello (6)
- Website: mtvema.com

Television/radio coverage
- Network: MTV; Channel 5

The 2018 MTV EMAs (also known as the MTV Europe Music Awards) was held at the Bizkaia Arena (Bilbao Exhibition Centre) in Barakaldo, part of Greater Bilbao, Basque Country, Spain, on 4 November 2018. The ceremony's host was Hailee Steinfeld. This was the third time that Spain hosted the ceremony.

Camila Cabello was nominated for 6 awards, followed by Ariana Grande and Post Malone, who were each nominated for five. Cabello won four awards, becoming the most awarded artist of the night.

In association with the EMAs, an event called MTV Music Week was organised, which run from 29 October to 3 November at different locations throughout the province of Biscay. The main concert, part of the MTV World Stage series, was held at San Mamés Stadium on 3 November, headlined by Muse and Crystal Fighters.

== Performances ==
=== Pre show ===
Artist(s)	Song(s)
Pre-show
Sofía Reyes	"1, 2, 3"

=== Main show ===
Artist	Featuring	Song
Nicki Minaj; Little Mix		"Majesty (reprise)" "Good Form" "Woman Like Me"
Panic! At The Disco		"High Hopes"
Rosalía		"De aquí no sales" "Malamente"
Hailee Steinfeld		"Back to Life"
Muse		"Pressure" (Filmed at San Mamés Stadium)
Janet Jackson		"Made for Now" (contains excerpts from "Rhythm Nation" and "All for You")
Bebe Rexha		"I'm a Mess"
Halsey		"Without Me"
Jason Derulo; David Guetta	Nicki Minaj	"Goodbye"
Alessia Cara		"Trust My Lonely"
Jack & Jack		"No One Compares to You" "Rise"
Marshmello	Anne-Marie; Bastille	"Friends" "Happier"

== Appearances ==
- Michael Peña and Diego Luna — presented Best Artist
- Dua Lipa — introduced Rosalía
- Debby Ryan — presented Best Song
- Lindsay Lohan — presented Best Electronic
- Terry Crews — introduced Muse
- Ashlee Simpson and Evan Ross — presented Best Pop
- Jourdan Dunn and Terry Crews — presented Best Video
- Anitta and Sofía Reyes — presented Best Hip-Hop
- Camila Cabello and Jason Derulo — presented Global Icon

== Nominations ==
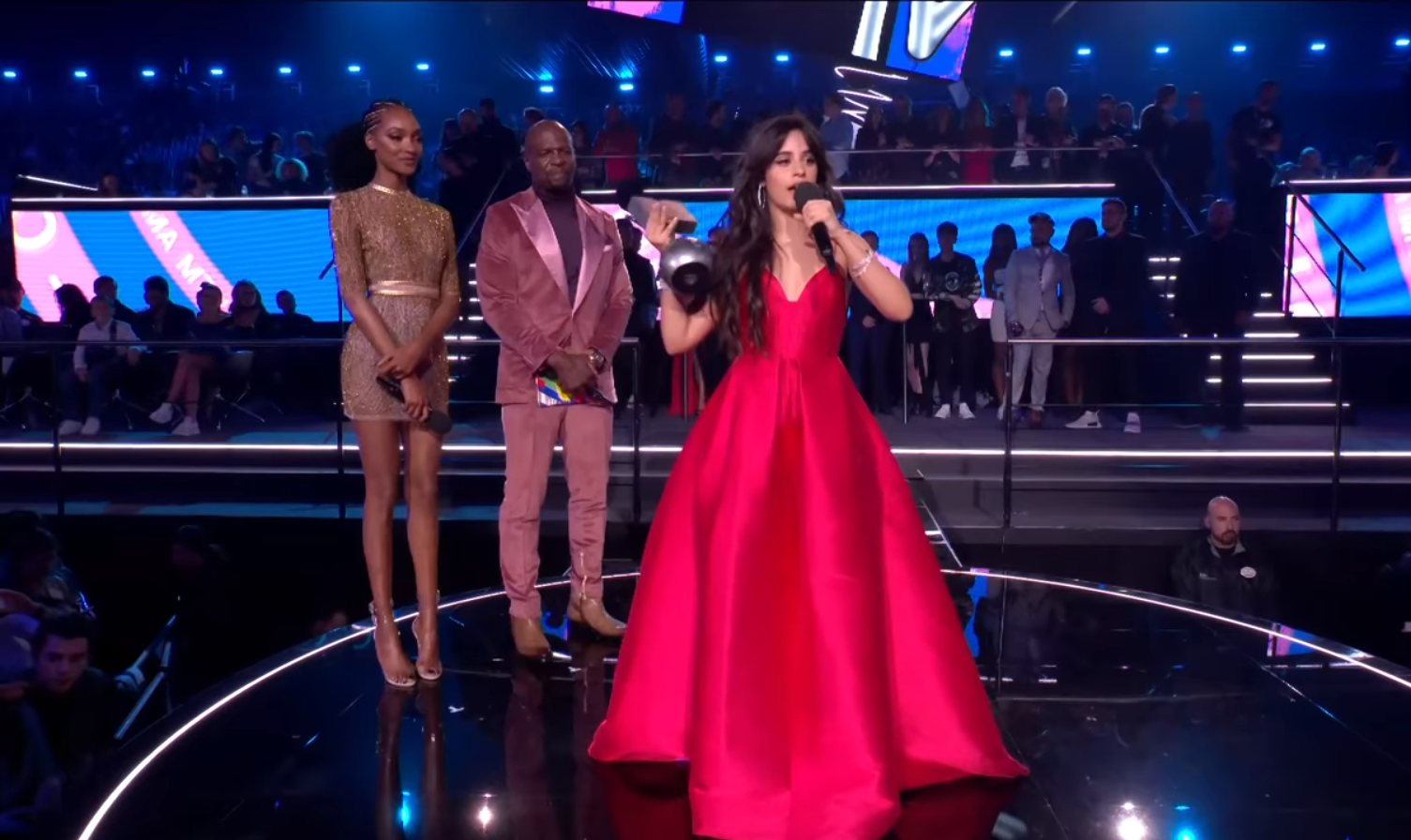
Camila Cabello accepting the Best Video

Winners are in bold text.

Best Song	Best Video
**Camila Cabello (featuring Young Thug) – "Havana"**: Ariana Grande — "No Tears Left to Cry"; Bebe Rexha (featuring Florida Georgia Line) — "Meant to Be"; Drake — "God's Plan"; Post Malone (featuring 21 Savage) — "Rockstar"	**Camila Cabello (featuring Young Thug) — "Havana"**: Ariana Grande — "No Tears Left to Cry"; Childish Gambino — "This Is America"; Lil Dicky (featuring Chris Brown) – "Freaky Friday"; The Carters — "Apeshit"
Best Artist	Best Group
**Camila Cabello**: Ariana Grande; Drake; Dua Lipa; Post Malone	**BTS**: 5 Seconds of Summer; Chloe x Halle; Maroon 5; Migos; PrettyMuch
Best New	Best Pop
**Cardi B**: Anne-Marie; Bazzi; Hayley Kiyoko; Jessie Reyez	**Dua Lipa**: Ariana Grande; Camila Cabello; Hailee Steinfeld; Shawn Mendes
Best Electronic	Best Rock
**Marshmello**: Calvin Harris; David Guetta; Martin Garrix; The Chainsmokers	**5 Seconds of Summer**: Foo Fighters; Imagine Dragons; Muse; U2
Best Alternative	Best Hip-Hop
**Panic! at the Disco**: Fall Out Boy; The 1975; Thirty Seconds To Mars; Twenty One Pilots	**Nicki Minaj**: Drake; Eminem; Migos; Travis Scott
Best Live	Best World Stage
**Shawn Mendes**: Ed Sheeran; Muse; Pink; The Carters	**Alessia Cara**: Clean Bandit; Charli XCX; David Guetta; Jason Derulo; Post Malone; Migos; J. Cole; Nick Jonas
Best Push Act	Biggest Fans
**Grace VanderWaal**: Why Don't We; Bishop Briggs; Superorganism; Jessie Reyez; Hayley Kiyoko; Lil Xan; Sigrid; Chloe x Halle; Bazzi; Jorja Smith	**BTS**: Camila Cabello; Selena Gomez; Shawn Mendes; Taylor Swift
Best Look	
**Nicki Minaj**: Cardi B; Dua Lipa; Migos; Post Malone	
Generation Change
**Sonita Alizadeh**; **Hauwa Ojeifo**; **Xiuhtezcatl "X" Martinez**; **Mohamad Al Jounde**; **Ellen Jones**
Global Icon
**Janet Jackson**

== Regional nominations ==
Winners are in bold text.

Europe
Best Belgian Act	Best Danish Act
**Dimitri Vegas & Like Mike**: Angèle; DVTCH NORRIS; Emma Bale; Warhola	**Scarlet Pleasure**: Bro; Sivas; Skinz; Soleima
Best Dutch Act	Best Finnish Act
**Shirak**: Bizzey; Maan; Naaz; Ronnie Flex	**JVG**: Evelina; Mikael Gabriel; Nikke Ankara; Sanni
Best French Act	Best German Act
**Bigflo & Oli**: Dadju; Louane; Orelsan; Vianney	**Mike Singer**: Bausa; Feine Sahne Fischfilet; Namika; Samy Deluxe
Best Hungarian Act	Best Israeli Act
**Follow The Flow**: Caramel; Halott Pénz; Margaret Island; Wellhello	**Noa Kirel**: Anna Zak; Nadav Guedj; Peled; Stephane Legar
Best Italian Act	Best Norwegian Act
**Annalisa**: Calcutta; Ghali; Liberato; Shade	**Alan Walker**: Astrid S; Kygo; Sigrid; Tungevaag & Raaban
Best Polish Act	Best Portuguese Act
**Margaret**: Brodka; Dawid Podsiadło; Natalia Nykiel; Taconafide	**Diogo Piçarra**: Bárbara Bandeira; Bispo; Blaya; Carolina Deslandes
Best Russian Act	Best Spanish Act
**Jah Khalib**: Eldzhey; Monetochka; Pharaoh; WE	**Viva Suecia**: Belako; Brisa Fenoy; Love of Lesbian; Rosalía
Best Swedish Act	Best Swiss Act
**Avicii**: Axwell & Ingrosso; Benjamin Ingrosso; Felix Sandman; First Aid Kit	**Loco Escrito**: Hecht; Lo & Leduc; Pronto; Zibbz
Best UK & Ireland Act	
**Little Mix**: Anne-Marie; Dua Lipa; George Ezra; Stormzy	
Africa
Best African Act
**Tiwa Savage**: Davido; Distruction Boyz; Fally Ipupa; Nyashinski; Shekhinah
Asia
Best Greater China Act	Best Indian Act
**Loura Lou**: Alex To; Lala Hsu; Silence Wang; Stringer Zhang	**Big Ri and Meba Ofilia**: Monica Dogra & Curtain Blue; Nikhil; Raja Kumari ft. Divine; Skyharbor
Best Japanese Act	Best Korean Act
**Little Glee Monster**: Daoko; Glim Spanky; Wednesday Campanella; Yahyel	**Loona**: Cosmic Girls; (G)I-dle; Golden Child; Pentagon
Best Southeast Asian Act	
**Joe Flizzow**: Afgan; IV of Spades; Minh Hang; Slot Machine; The Sam Willows; Twopee Southside	
Australia and New Zealand
Best Australian Act	Best New Zealand Act
**Tkay Maidza**: Amy Shark; Dean Lewis; Peking Duk; The Rubens	**Mitch James**: Kimbra; Robinson; Stan Walker; Thomston
Americas
Best Brazilian Act	Best Canadian Act
**Anitta**: Alok; Ludmilla; Nego do Borel; Pabllo Vittar	**Shawn Mendes**: Alessia Cara; Arcade Fire; Drake; The Weeknd
Best Latin America North Act	Best Latin America Central Act
**Ha*Ash**: Molotov; Mon Laferte; Sofía Reyes; Reik	**Sebastián Yatra**: J Balvin; Karol G; Maluma; Manuel Turizo
Best Latin America South Act	Best US Act
**Lali**: Duki; Los Auténticos Decadentes; Paulo Londra; TINI	**Camila Cabello**: Ariana Grande; Cardi B; Imagine Dragons; Post Malone

== See also ==
- 2018 MTV Video Music Awards
