= MTV Europe Music Awards =

Musical awards

- Previous: 2024 MTV Europe Music Awards
- The MTV Europe Music Award trophy
- Awarded for: Music and pop culture
- Location: Various (see below)
- Country: European countries
- Presented by: Paramount International Networks
- Formerly called: MTV European Music Awards
- First award: 1994
- Final award: 2024
- Website: mtvema.com
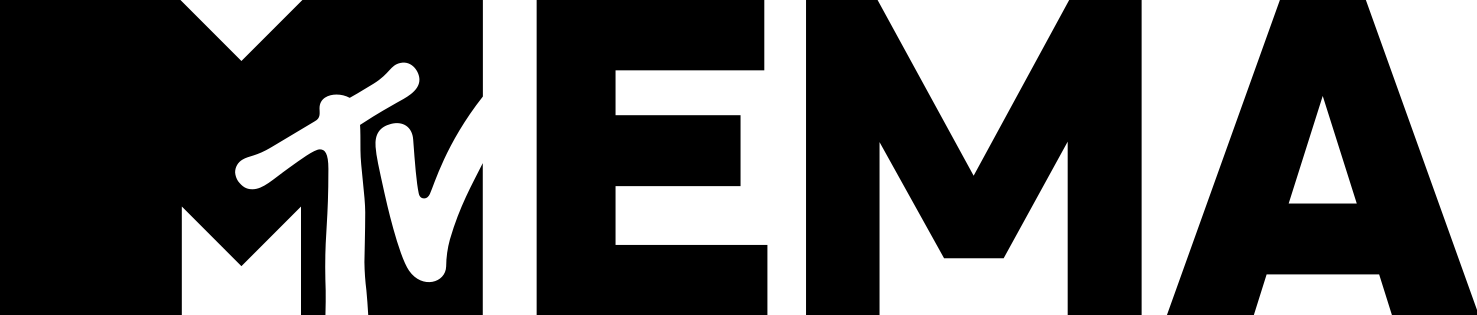
- Ceremony's logo

The MTV Europe Music Awards, commonly abbreviated as EMAs, were awards presented by Paramount International Networks to recognise achievements in music and popular culture. Originally conceived as an alternative to the MTV Video Music Awards, which are held annually in the United States, the ceremony took place each year in a different country, predominantly in the United Kingdom and Germany. The annual event featured live performances by prominent artists and presentations of awards across a range of popular music categories.

The awards reflected the international music scene, recognising artists from different geographical regions and achievements across a diverse range of musical genres and disciplines. Since the 2007 ceremony, viewers have been able to vote for their favourite artists in the general categories through MTV's website.

The 1st Europe Music Awards ceremony was held in 1994 at the Brandenburg Gate in Berlin, Germany, five years after the fall of the Berlin Wall. The ceremony was broadcast live on MTV Europe, Channel 5 and various MTV channels internationally, as well as online.

== Notable moments ==
=== 1990s ===
==== 1994–1999 ====
1994: The first Europe Music Awards took place in Berlin, Germany, at the Brandenburg Gate and were held on 24 November 1994, five years after the fall of the Berlin Wall. Hosted by Tom Jones, the show featured performances by Aerosmith, Ace of Base, Björk, Roxette, Take That and George Michael, who performed "Jesus to a Child" and "Freedom" surrounded by many famous models including Naomi Campbell. Presenters included East 17, Jean Paul Gaultier, Pamela Anderson and Helena Christensen, who kissed INXS's Michael Hutchence live on stage. Bono received the Free Your Mind Award on behalf of Amnesty International.

1995: French nuclear testing in the South Pacific got the most attention at the 1995 ceremony. During his acceptance speech after winning the award for Best Rock, Bon Jovi lead singer Jon Bon Jovi stated, "The only enemy is ignorance. Peace, people. Let's get rid of all this nuclear testing", while U2's Bono said, "What a city, what a night, what a crowd, what a bomb, what a mistake, what a wanker you have for a President." referring to nuclear testing. Greenpeace, the environmental group that has staged creative and controversial protests around the testing site at Mururoa Atoll, took the Free Your Mind award for its campaign against the underground nuclear blasts. "Stop abusing the Earth," urged Madonna in a videotaped segment before designer agnès b. picked up the award for Greenpeace.

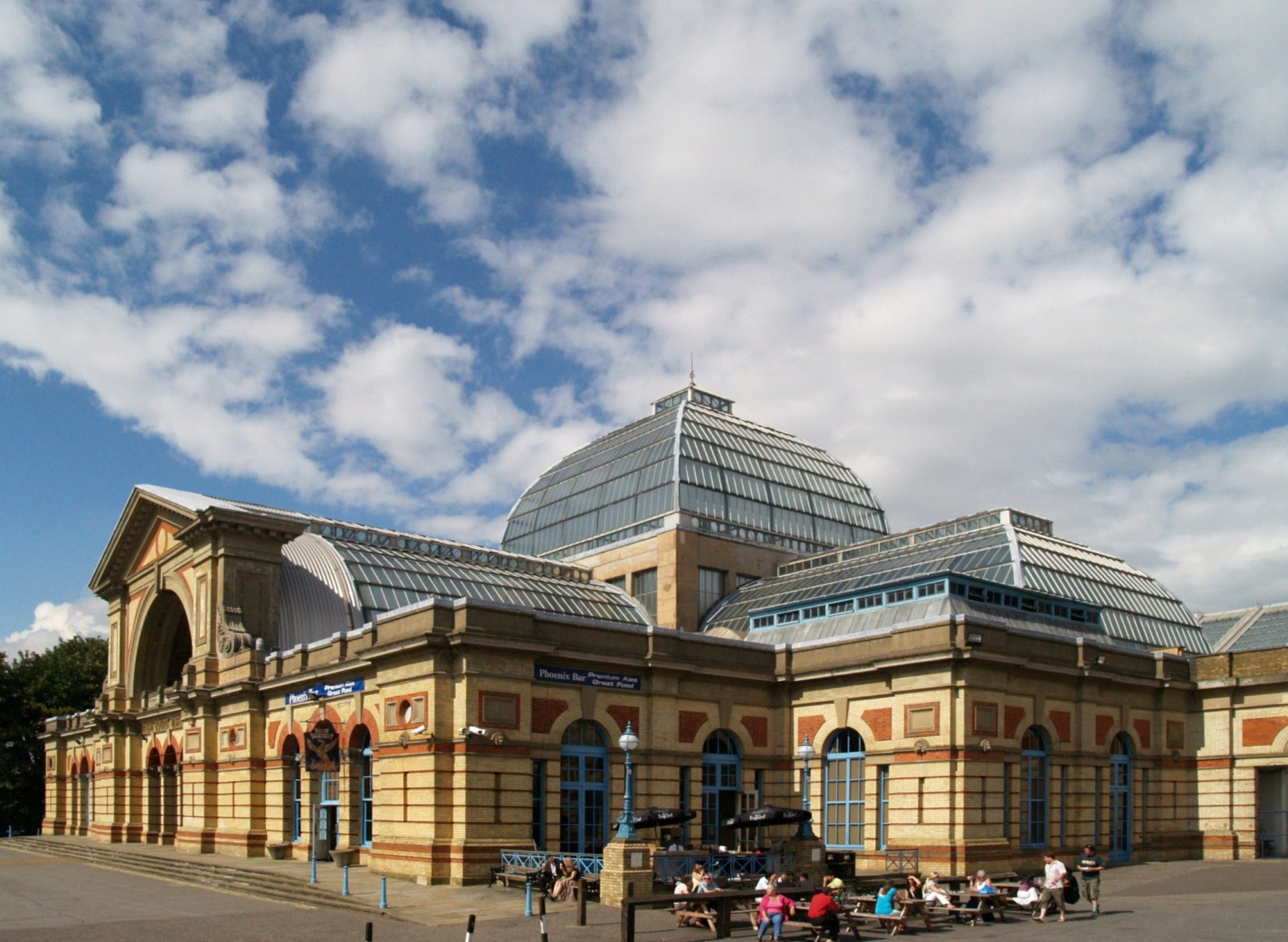
Alexandra Palace in London, venue in 1996.

1996: During their performance Metallica performed the songs "Last Caress" and "So What?" instead of performing their single "King Nothing" as scheduled. The MTV executives told the band that they weren't allowed to use any curse words during their time on live TV, and upset with the scripted, family-friendly MTV antics, Metallica simply played non-TV friendly songs. The song "So What?" is known for its amount of expletives and references to bestiality among many other controversial lyrics while "Last Caress" has lyrics pertaining to murder and rape. As a result of their performance Metallica's performance and references to Metallica have been removed from future broadcasts of the ceremony.

1997: U2 opened the show performing "Mofo" dressed in boxing gowns. The Prodigy were the big winners of the night, receiving three awards including Best Video. Björk became the first artist to be nominated in the category of Best Female for four consecutive years. The Landmine Survivors Network received the Free Your Mind Award for helping survivors to recover from war, rebuild their communities, and break cycles of violence.

1998: Six new categories were introduced that year, including the MTV Selects; UK & Ireland, Northern, Central and Southern. Faithless opened the show with "God is a DJ" and Madonna performed "The Power of Goodbye". The big winner of the night were the Spice Girls and Madonna with two awards each. Melanie C and Emma Bunton collected the trophy on behalf of the group. On receiving the award, Mel C shouted, "We've done it again. And a big hello from the other two", referring to Mel B and Victoria Adams, both of whom were pregnant and did not attend the ceremony. The Prodigy won Best Dance but according to their frontman, Liam Howlett, they had not done anything to deserve the accolade that year.

1999: Britney Spears was the big winner of the night winning four awards, including Best New Act and Best Song for "...Baby One More Time". She also performed during the ceremony, entertaining the crowd with a medley of her songs "...Baby One More Time" and "(You Drive Me) Crazy". The Free Your Mind Award, which honours an individual or organisation for aiding in humanitarian efforts and fighting prejudice, was given to Bono for his world peace work. Puff Daddy performed "My Best Friend" backed by a full gospel choir, followed by Iggy Pop, who stagedived into the crowd during the track "Lust for Life". Whitney Houston sang a medley of "Get It Back" and "My Love Is Your Love", while Mariah Carey performed "Heartbreaker". Marilyn Manson, who wore nothing but a G-string, closed the show with a performance of "Rock Is Dead".

=== 2000s ===
==== 2000–2004 ====
2000: The show was hosted by Fugees's Wyclef Jean, who presented a variety of stars and outfits, including one consisting of boxer shorts only, after he jumped into the crowd and had his red leather suit ripped from him. The performance of the Spice Girls during the ceremony was the last before their breakup. The most elaborate appearance was probably by Jennifer Lopez, who literally landed on stage in an aeroplane. The performance was a world premiere of her new song, "Love Don't Cost a Thing", taken from her forthcoming album, J.Lo. Madonna paid tribute to fellow performer Kylie Minogue by appearing on stage in a T-shirt bearing the name "Kylie". Madonna performed Music (Madonna song), one month after giving birth to son, Rocco, with a screen background of clips reminiscent of her long career. Sacha Baron Cohen made his career debut during the ceremony whilst introducing Madonna.

Political issues were present as well during the night, with Nick Carter from Backstreet Boys speaking against a recount of votes in the U.S. presidential election. Robbie Williams won Best Song for "Rock DJ", but he told the audience: "I am not going to say anything bad about people's choices on this one, but I think it's a terrible song and a silly song." He also referred to his roots in Stoke-on-Trent, saying: "When I was growing up I dreamt of being a pop star and I would like to thank MTV for my three houses, my five cars and my supermodel girlfriend."

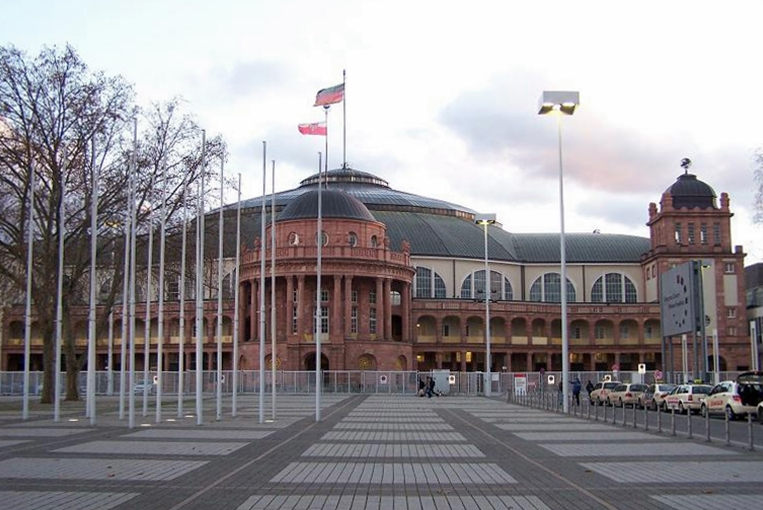
Festhalle Frankfurt, venue in 2001 and 2012.

2001: The ceremony was the first entertainment broadcasts following the September 11th attacks in New York City. When Damon Albarn and Jamie Hewlett from Gorillaz walked onto stage to make a speech, Albarn sported a T-shirt with the Campaign for Nuclear Disarmament logo on it. Albarn, in a response to the recent invasion of Afghanistan said "So, fuck the music. Listen. See this symbol here, [pointing to the tee shirt] this the symbol for the Campaign for Nuclear Disarmament. Bombing one of the poorest countries in the world is wrong. You've got a voice and you have got to do what you can about it allright?" Fred Durst took the stage with Wes Scantlin and Jimmy Page to perform the classic Led Zeppelin's song "Thank You".

2002: One of the highlights was the offer made by host Puff Daddy giving away a lush ring to the first woman to undress on stage. A lady took the stage take off her clothes and won the ring. When Moby came on stage to collect the award for Best Website he wished the best wishes to Eminem, showing that he bore no grudge after the confrontation on the 2002 MTV Video Music Awards. Robbie Williams and Whitney Houston performed their songs "Feel" and "Whatchulookinat" for the first time ever. Enrique Iglesias performed an acoustic version of his single "Maybe" and then a rock version of the track "Love to See You Cry" done to the music of Billy Idol's "White Wedding".

2003: During the pre-show, Christina Aguilera refused to walk the red carpet if Kelly Osbourne, a guest VJ for the event, was present. Kelly responded by calling Aguilera's music "crap" and saying she was a "cow". Later, a skit was aired of Christina Aguilera throwing darts at a board decorated with a picture of Kelly Osbourne. This irked Osbourne, who voiced her disapproval when she came onstage to present an award. Kelly stated, "If Christina Aguilera has to resort to throwing darts at my head after everything she's achieved and everything she's done, then she's a really sad, sorry person". Aguilera later retorted with a voice of mock sympathy, saying "Honey, if you can dish it out, you've got to learn how to take it back".

During Travis' performance of "The Beautiful Occupation" an assembly of nude protesters marched onstage with signs that covered their private areas. At the end of the song, they lifted the signs. While near at the end of performing "Baby Boy", Beyoncé and Sean Paul both were up on stage when their backing track suffered a technical difficulty. This went on for a near minute in which both artist and dancers exited the stage while the error went on. This also left confusion among presenter Christina Aguilera, who walked on stage to continue hosting which ended the backing track error. Both artists later decided to retake the performance again. The retake would later replace re-airings of the show and would be the first show to extend time with this retake.

2004: The show was held at Tor di Valle Racecourse in Rome. The outdoor stage was situated in front of the Colosseum, where artists such as Eminem, Franz Ferdinand, Beastie Boys, and Anastacia performed to an attendance of over 400,000 people. Outkast received both Best Song and Best Video for their track "Hey Ya!". Other multiple winners include Usher and Muse with two awards each. Presenters on the night included Jamelia, Alicia Keys, N.E.R.D, Naomi Campbell, Andre 3000, Kid Rock and Kanye West.

==== 2005–2009 ====
2005 : Madonna opened the show in a giant disco ball performing "Hung Up". Sacha Baron Cohen hosted the ceremony as Borat Sagdiyev, who greeted the audience by saying "Welcome to the 2005 Eurovision Song Contest" and referring to Madonna, he stated, "It was very courageous of MTV to start the show with a genuine transvestite". Gorillaz used hologram-style technology to beam three-dimensional performing cartoon characters on stage. Madonna returned to the stage to present the Free Your Mind Award to Bob Geldof. "You drive me crazy, but tonight you are everyone's hero," she said. He replied: "This means much more to me than many of the other things that are given to me".

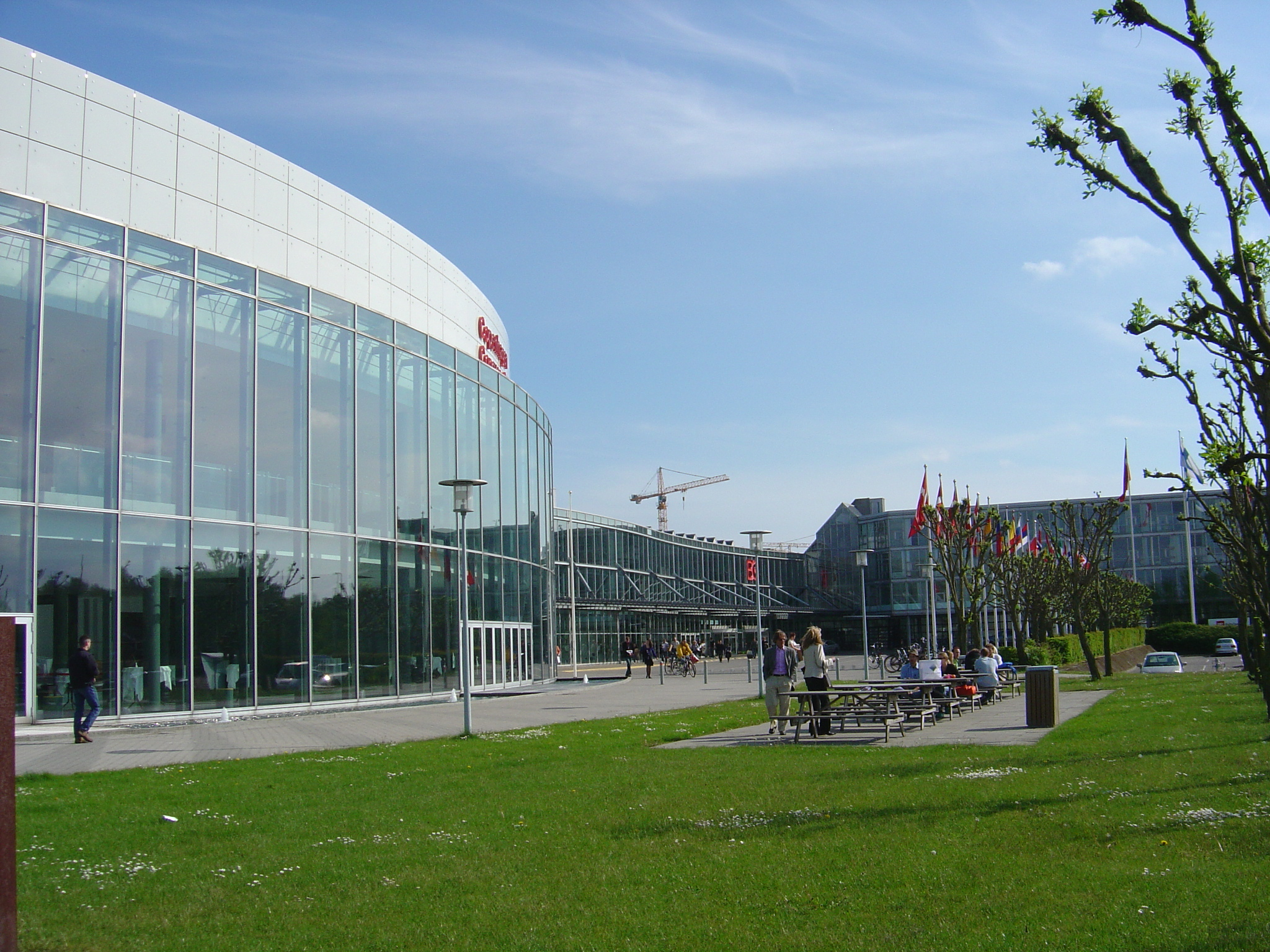
Bella Center in Copenhagen, venue in 2006.

2006: The 13th Europe Music Awards was hosted by Justin Timberlake, who received Best Male and Best Pop. Timberlake joked that he only won because he agreed to present the event in Copenhagen. Depeche Mode said, "A big thank you to the fans and a big thank you to MTV for playing our videos for twenty-five years", after winning the award for Best Group. British comedian Sacha Baron Cohen entertained the audience with his English-mangling character Borat and poked fun at Madonna who was at the time trying to adopt an African child adding: "My only concern is that this singing transvestite will not be such a good father."

Despite winning the award for Best Hip-Hop, Kanye West apparently was so disappointed at not winning for Best Video that he crashed the stage when the award was being presented to Justice and Simian for "We Are Your Friends". In a tirade riddled with expletives, Kanye West said he should have won the prize for his video "Touch the Sky", because it "cost a million dollars, Pamela Anderson was in it. I was jumping across canyons." He further said, "If I don't win, the awards show loses credibility".

2007: Foo Fighters opened the show and front man Dave Grohl hosted the backstage area, interviewing celebrities live on air. Other performances on the night came from Amy Winehouse, Foo Fighters, Babyshambles, My Chemical Romance, Avril Lavigne, and Mika. will.i.am paired up with Nicole Scherzinger from the Pussycat Dolls to perform their duet "Baby Love". Pete Doherty surprised his critics by being on great form for the whole show in preparation for his performance with Babyshambles. The show was closed by Tokio Hotel, who were booed but given a standing ovation after their performance in the rain. The show received a total of 78 million votes, the most in Europe Music Awards history.

2008: Rick Astley was named Best Act Ever after an online campaign to orchestrate votes. Britney Spears was the big winner of the night winning Best Album and Best Act. She did not attend the show but recorded a couple videos thanking her fans. Paul McCartney was awarded with the Ultimate Legend given by Bono. After picking up his honour, Sir Paul settled for thanking friends, family and bandmates Ringo Starr, George Harrison and John Lennon. "Many years ago, four little boys were born here in Liverpool and we went on to do quite well," he added. "So thanks, as I say, to all my family, to all of you for coming along, everyone in Liverpool, everyone in Britain, everyone in America – for voting in Mr Obama. I love you!"

The show contained numerous references to Barack Obama, most notably when Kanye West and Estelle finished their song "American Boy" with the US President-elect's face projected onto a giant screen behind them. Jared Leto, Shannon Leto and Tomo Miličević from Thirty Seconds to Mars wore Obama T-shirts, and Jared Leto also asked the crowd to stand in honour of the Democratic senator. Amid cheers, he said: "Liverpool, lets hear it for Barack Obama." Host Katy Perry remarked, "Maybe Europe will love us again now."

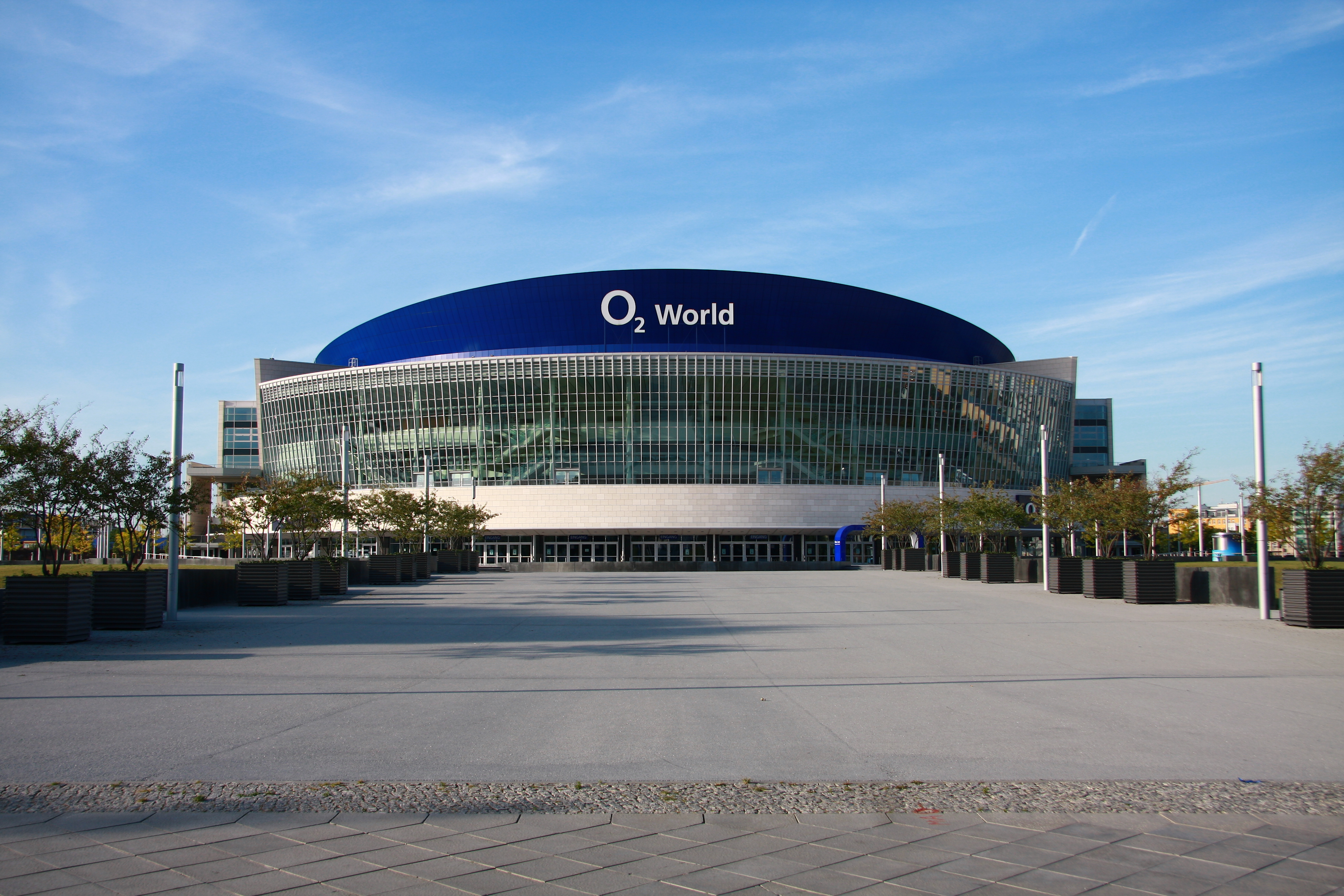
O_{2} World in Berlin, venue in 2009.

2009: Returning for the second time as host, Katy Perry opened the show and performed a medley of the nominees for Best Song. The Jonas Brothers introduced a tribute to Michael Jackson performed by Michael's fans in front of the Brandenburg Gate in Berlin. U2 and Jay-Z performed "Sunday Bloody Sunday" in front of the Brandenburg Gate with Jay-Z freestyling over the performance and rapped in the lyrics from Bob Marley's "Get Up, Stand Up". Beyoncé won three awards, the most awards that night. Pete Wentz was the host for the show webcast.

=== 2010s ===
==== 2010–2014 ====
2010: The event was hosted by Eva Longoria, who had thirteen outfit changes, one of which was shaped like a huge Spanish ham. She introduced the crowd to a gang of hunks, pretending they were family. Lady Gaga was the big winner of the night – she won while performing in The Monster Ball Tour from Budapest, in Hungary, she thanked her fans via satellite after receiving Best Female, Best Song and Best Pop. Thirty Seconds to Mars opened the event at the pre-show featuring surprise guest Kanye West at the Puerta de Alcalá. Bon Jovi received the first ever Global Icon Award.

During her acceptance speech for Best New Act, Kesha directly addressed her fans, saying: "Hopefully I can inspire you to give your finger to the cynics and fucking be yourself!". Newly married singer Katy Perry won Best Video for "California Gurls" and came to the event with her husband Russell Brand. This was the couple's first public appearance together as husband and wife. The event would also be remembered for the antics of Johnny Knoxville along with The Dudesons.

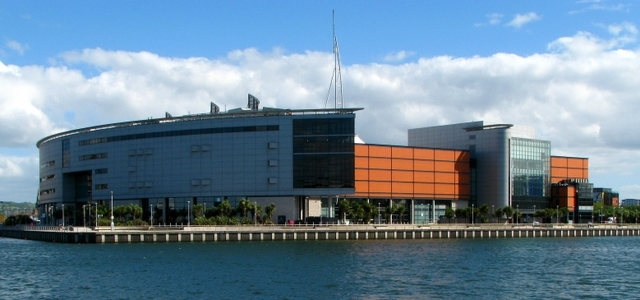
Odyssey Arena in Belfast, venue in 2011.

2011: The show was held in Belfast, Northern Ireland, at the city's Odyssey Arena and hosted by Selena Gomez. For the second consecutive year, Lady Gaga was the biggest winner with four awards out of six nominations; she received Biggest Fans and Best Female, as well as Best Song and Best Video for "Born This Way". Queen received the Global Icon Award, and the band closed the awards ceremony, with Adam Lambert on vocals, performing "The Show Must Go On", "We Will Rock You" and "We Are the Champions". There was also a tribute to Amy Winehouse, which was introduced by Jessie J. It was revealed that for the event MTV received 154 million votes from people around the globe. Hayden Panettiere's presentation of the award for Best Song was briefly interrupted by a streaker who joined her onstage.

2012: The event was hosted by Heidi Klum and Ludacris, and held in Frankfurt at the city's Festhalle Frankfurt, for the second time in the history of the awards. The show saw the addition of new regional categories to compete in the Best Worldwide Act. Taylor Swift, Han Geng, Justin Bieber and One Direction were the biggest winners of the night, taking home three awards each. The show featured performances from Muse, Taylor Swift, No Doubt, Carly Rae Jepsen, Alicia Keys, and The Killers, among others. There was also a tribute to Whitney Houston, which was introduced by Alicia Keys. Houston was also awarded with the Global Icon Award.

2013: The event took place in Amsterdam, at the city's Ziggo Dome. Several performances of the main show were performed at different locations in the city than the Ziggo Dome. Eminem was the big winner of the night, winning his eighth Best Hip-Hop and receiving the Global Icon Award. He then performed the songs "Berzerk" and "Rap God". The show also included a controversial moment, when Miley Cyrus received Best Video for "Wrecking Ball". The singer appeared to light up a joint on stage while accepting the award.

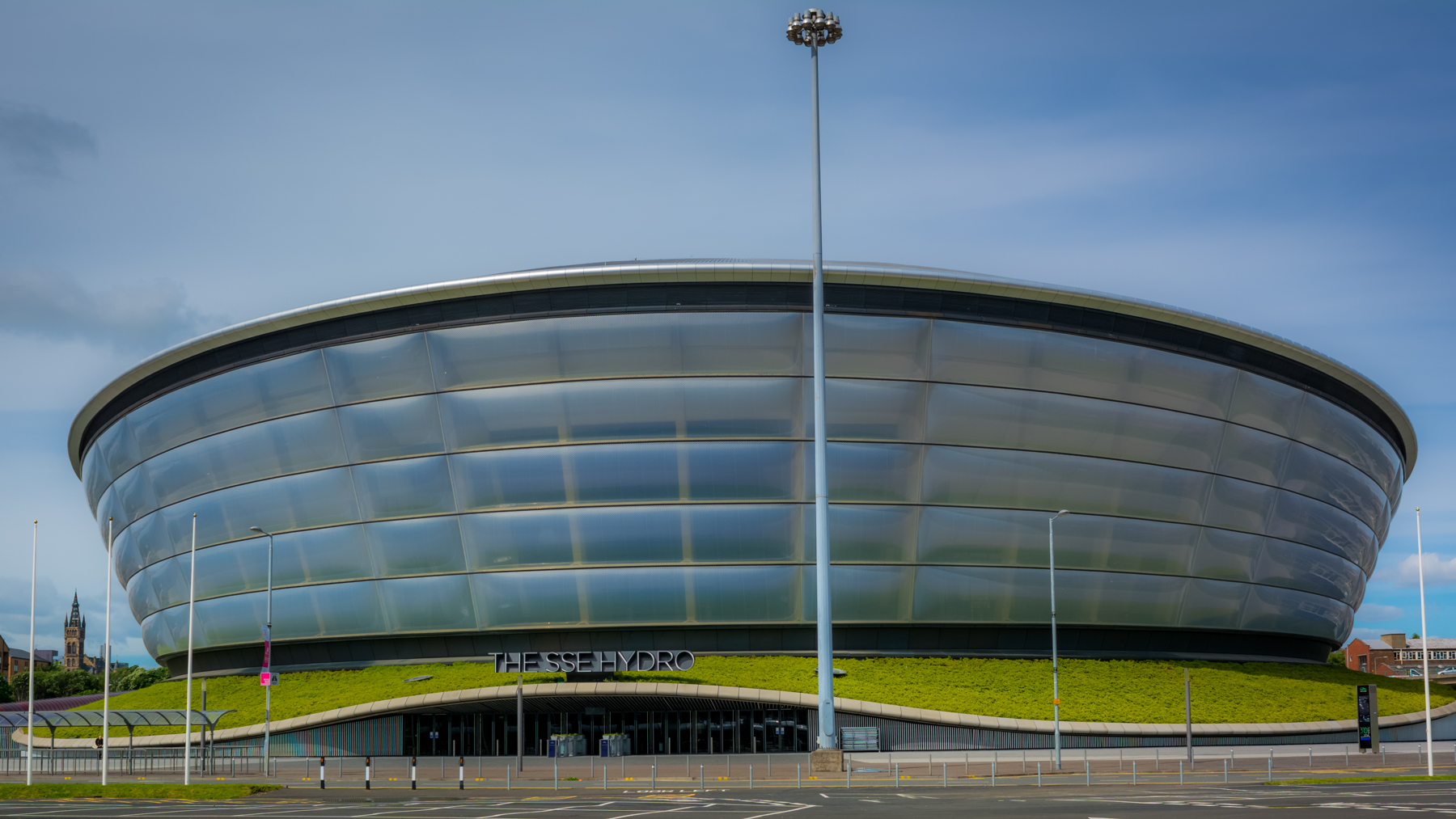
The SSE Hydro in Glasgow, venue in 2014

2014: It was the second time the awards took place in Scotland and overall the fifth time United Kingdom has hosted the show since 2011 in Belfast, Northern Ireland. Ariana Grande opened the show, hosted by Nicki Minaj, with "Problem" and "Break Free". One Direction and 5 Seconds of Summer were the big winners of the night receiving three awards each, though both artists were unable to attend the show, and despite them sending pre-recorded videos to thank their fans, their absence was met with some boos. Ozzy Osbourne received the Global Icon Award from Slash. Slash later closed the show performing "Crazy Train", along with The Conspirators, Simon Neil from Biffy Clyro and Myles Kennedy, as a tribute to him.

==== 2015–2019 ====
2015: The show, hosted by Ed Sheeran and Ruby Rose, was for the first time held in October. It took place at the Mediolanum Forum in Assago, near Milan. Throughout the second half of the year, Milan also hosted Expo 2015, which was a partner of the 2015 Europe Music Awards. In association with the event, MTV Italy organised an event called Music Week. Two concerts were held in Piazza del Duomo, one of which was related to MTV World Stage. International and Italian acts performed on both nights, including Ellie Goulding, Marco Mengoni, Duran Duran, Martin Garrix and Afrojack. Duran Duran was awarded the first ever Video Visionary Award. Over 500 million votes were cast for the event. Justin Bieber won six awards, becoming the most awarded artist of the night. In addition, it was the first award show to be aired with virtual reality.

2016: During the ceremony, host Bebe Rexha revealed the trophies had been turned purple in memory of Prince, who died early that year. Multiple winners of the night included Lady Gaga, Twenty One Pilots, Shawn Mendes and Martin Garrix. Green Day were awarded with the Global Icon Award for their contribution to music. Collecting their award, Green Day frontman Billie Joe Armstrong said it was "nice to be out of America just for a second because of this horrendous election that's going on right now", referring to the 2016 United States presidential election that saw Donald Trump being elected as the 45th president of the United States. He further said, "our entire country is about to have one big collective heart attack" and then the band performed the song "American Idiot".

2017: The show was hosted in London for the first time in 21 years. It was presented by British singer Rita Ora. Mayor Sadiq Khan attended the show, as he helped bring the event to the capital as part of his LondonIsOpen campaign. Eminem opened the ceremony with a performance of the song "Walk on Water" featuring Skylar Grey. The performance garnered mixed reactions due to the absence of Beyoncé, who provided additional vocals on the original track. During his acceptance speech after winning the award for Best Alternative, Thirty Seconds to Mars frontman Jared Leto made a remark at American President Donald Trump's immigration policy as he stated: "We are Americans – a land of immigrants – and we just want to say that we welcome you with open arms and with open hearts, and we love you." U2, who performed a free gig at London's Trafalgar Square, received the Global Icon Award. A clip of George Michael's performance of Freedom at the 1994 MTV EMAs aired as an in memoriam segment, featuring Michael, Chris Cornell, Chester Bennington and Tom Petty

2018: The show was hosted by Academy Award-nominated actress and singer Hailee Steinfeld, who also performed "Back to Life" during the ceremony. It took place at the Bizkaia Arena, part of the Bilbao Exhibition Centre complex near Bilbao, Spain. Other performers included Nicki Minaj, Little Mix, flamenco star Rosalía, Bebe Rexha, Jack & Jack, Jason Derulo, David Guetta, Marshmello or Panic! at the Disco, whose singer climbed down the venue's wall before emerging from the ceiling. Camila Cabello won four awards, becoming the most awarded artist of the night. Janet Jackson was awarded with the Global Icon Award, and collecting her award, Jackson dedicated her speech to "women's voices who have been stifled", stating she is "one of those women" and calling them to "speak up for justice".

2019: The show was hosted in Seville, Spain, making it the first time that a country hosted back-to-back editions of the award show. Dua Lipa opened the show with a performance of her song "Don't Start Now" accompanied by dozens of female dancers. Other performers included Halsey, Rosalía, Niall Horan, Mabel, Ava Max, Green Day, and Becky G, who was also the host for the ceremony. Boy band NCT 127 became the first K-pop act to perform at the MTV EMAs. Former Oasis frontman Liam Gallagher received the specially created Rock Icon Award. The night also saw Taylor Swift, FKA Twigs, Martin Garrix, Nicki Minaj, Billie Eilish and Shawn Mendes send out pre-recorded messages after winning their respective awards as they were absent from the event.

=== 2020s ===
==== 2020–2025 ====
2020: The ceremony was hosted on 8 November. Due to the ongoing COVID-19 pandemic, the show was held for the first time ever virtually and the performances were filmed in various locations around the world. The ceremony was hosted by Little Mix, but only three members of the group, Perrie Edwards, Leigh-Anne Pinnock and Jade Thirlwall, appeared; Jesy Nelson did not participate for health reasons. The event featured performances from Little Mix, Doja Cat (who performed a Rock version of her hit single "Say So"), David Guetta, yungblud, Sam Smith and DaBaby. South Korean Pop group BTS were the biggest winners of the night as they claimed 4 awards from the 5 categories they nominated in. Other winners of the night included Coldplay (for Best Rock), Hayley Williams of Paramore (for Best Alternative), Karol G (for Best Collaboration and Best Latin), DJ Khaled (for Best Video) and Doja Cat (for Best New) who also sent pre-recorded video messages to thank their fans. Later that evening, Formula One Driver Lewis Hamilton delivered a speech that touched upon the importance of music and how it remains a unifying force that brings hope and solidarity during a rather chaotic and challenging year. He then proceeded to present the Video For Good Award which went to H.E.R.

2021: The ceremony was held in Budapest, Hungary, in spite of the controversy triggered by the anti-LGBT law promoted by the Hungarian government. Chris McCarthy, CEO of MTV Entertainment Group Worldwide, explained that despite the law MTV decided not to move the show to promote through its support for the country's LGBT community.

2022: The ceremony was held at the PSD Bank Dome in Düsseldorf, Germany on 13 November, hosted by Rita Ora and Taika Waititi. Taylor Swift attended the EMAs for the first time in 10 years, and won 4 awards including Best Video and Best Artist. The show also included performances from Ava Max, Bebe Rexha and Gayle.

2023: The ceremony would have been held in Paris for the first time since 1995. It was cancelled on 19 October due to the Gaza war; the winning artists would receive their awards at a later date.

2024: The ceremony was held at the Co-op Live in Manchester, United Kingdom on 10 November, hosted by Rita Ora. In it, Rita paid tribute to her friend and One Direction legend Liam Payne.

2025: Several MTV events worldwide, including the EMAs, are paused for 2025 as Paramount Global attempts to close its merger with Skydance Media, along with a number of MTV's European networks closing throughout 2024 and into 2025 due to network cuts and ratings struggles.

== List of ceremonies ==
Year	Date	Venue	Host city	Host(s)	Best Song winner	Ref.
1994	24 November	Brandenburg Gate	(Germany) Berlin	Tom Jones	"7 Seconds" by Youssou N'Dour and Neneh Cherry	
1995	23 November	Zénith de Paris	(France) Paris	Jean Paul Gaultier	"Zombie" by the Cranberries	
1996	14 November	Alexandra Palace	(England) London	Robbie Williams	"Wonderwall" by Oasis	
1997	6 November	Rotterdam Ahoy	(Netherlands) Rotterdam	Ronan Keating	"Mmmbop" by Hanson	
1998	12 November	FilaForum	(Italy) Milan	Jenny McCarthy	"Torn" by Natalie Imbruglia	
1999	11 November	Point Theatre	(Republic of Ireland) Dublin	Ronan Keating	"...Baby One More Time" by Britney Spears	
2000	16 November	Stockholm Globe Arena	(Sweden) Stockholm	Wyclef Jean	"Rock DJ" by Robbie Williams	
2001	8 November	Festhalle Frankfurt	(Germany) Frankfurt	Sacha Baron Cohen as Ali G	"Clint Eastwood" by Gorillaz	
2002	14 November	Palau Sant Jordi	(Spain) Barcelona	P. Diddy	"Get the Party Started" by Pink	
2003	6 November	Western Harbour	(Scotland) Edinburgh	Christina Aguilera	"Crazy in Love" by Beyoncé featuring Jay Z	
2004	18 November	Tor di Valle	(Italy) Rome	Xzibit	"Hey Ya!" by Outkast	
2005	3 November	Pavilhão Atlântico	(Portugal) Lisbon	Sacha Baron Cohen as Borat Sagdiyev	"Speed of Sound" by Coldplay	
2006	2 November	Bella Center	(Denmark) Copenhagen	Justin Timberlake	"Crazy" by Gnarls Barkley	
2007	1 November	Olympiahalle	(Germany) Munich	Snoop Dogg	"Girlfriend" by Avril Lavigne	
2008	6 November	Echo Arena	(England) Liverpool	Katy Perry	"So What" by Pink	
2009	5 November	O2 World	(Germany) Berlin	Katy Perry	"Halo" by Beyoncé	
2010	7 November	Caja Mágica	(Spain) Madrid	Eva Longoria	"Bad Romance" by Lady Gaga	
2011	6 November	Odyssey Arena	(Northern Ireland) Belfast	Selena Gomez	"Born This Way" by Lady Gaga	
2012	11 November	Festhalle Frankfurt	(Germany) Frankfurt	Heidi Klum and Ludacris	"Call Me Maybe" by Carly Rae Jepsen	
2013	10 November	Ziggo Dome	(Netherlands) Amsterdam	Redfoo	"Locked Out of Heaven" by Bruno Mars	
2014	9 November	The SSE Hydro	(Scotland) Glasgow	Nicki Minaj	"Problem" by Ariana Grande featuring Iggy Azalea	
2015	25 October	Mediolanum Forum	(Italy) Milan	Ed Sheeran and Ruby Rose	"Bad Blood" by Taylor Swift featuring Kendrick Lamar	
2016	6 November	Rotterdam Ahoy	(Netherlands) Rotterdam	Bebe Rexha	"Sorry" by Justin Bieber	
2017	12 November	The SSE Arena Wembley	(England) London	Rita Ora	"There's Nothing Holdin' Me Back" by Shawn Mendes	
2018	4 November	Bizkaia Arena	(Spain) Bilbao	Hailee Steinfeld	"Havana" by Camila Cabello featuring Young Thug	
2019	3 November	FIBES Conference and Exhibition Centre	(Spain) Seville	Becky G	"Bad Guy" by Billie Eilish	
2020	8 November	Breakfast Television Centre (Note: The 2020 ceremony was originally planned to take place in Budapest, Hungary, but due to the impact of the COVID-19 pandemic in Europe, the ceremony was presented from the Breakfast Television Centre in London, the headquarters of Paramount Networks UK & Australia (then named ViacomCBS Networks UK & Australia), with pre-recorded musical acts filmed elsewhere.)	(England) London	Little Mix	"Dynamite" by BTS	
2021	14 November	László Papp Budapest Sports Arena	(Hungary) Budapest	Saweetie	"Bad Habits" by Ed Sheeran	
2022	13 November	PSD Bank Dome	(Germany) Düsseldorf	Rita Ora and Taika Waititi	"Super Freaky Girl" by Nicki Minaj	
2023	~~5 November~~	~~Paris Nord Villepinte~~	~~(France) Paris~~	None; ceremony was cancelled	"Seven" by Jungkook featuring Latto	
2024	10 November	Co-op Live	(England) Manchester	Rita Ora	"Espresso" by Sabrina Carpenter	
2025	The awards were paused in 2025					

== Award categories ==
There are 17 main categories ("Main Categories") and 31 local categories open for voting. The awards for Best Video and World Wide Act are chosen by the MTV Music Editorial Team and are not eligible for voting. At the time of voting, voters must be 13 years of age or older and cannot be an employee, agent, or representative of Viacom International Media Networks, a division of Viacom International, Inc. ("VIMN"), or any of its parent companies, affiliates or related companies.

Current main categories

- Best Song
- Best Video
- Best Artist
- Best New Act
- Best Push Act
- Best Pop
- Best Rock
- Best Hip-Hop
- Best R&B
- Best Electronic
- Best Alternative
- Best K-Pop
- Best Latin
- Best Afrobeats
- Best Live Act
- Best Collaboration
- Biggest Fans

Regional Acts

Europe

- Best Baltic Act
- Best Belgian Act
- Best Dutch Act
- Best French Act
- Best German Act
- Best Hungarian Act
- Best Israeli Act
- Best Italian Act
- Best Nordic Act
- Best Polish Act
- Best Portuguese Act
- Best Spanish Act
- Best Swiss Act
- Best UK & Ireland Act
- Best Ukrainian Act

Rest of the World

- Best African Act
- Best Australian Act
- Best Brazilian Act
- Best Canadian Act
- Best Indian Act
- Best Japanese Act
- Best Korean Act
- Best Greater China Act
- Best Latin America North Act
- Best Latin America Central Act
- Best Latin America South Act
- Best Caribbean Act
- Best New Zealander Act
- Best Southeast Asian Act
- Best US Act
- Best Asian Act

== Most nominated and winning artists ==
As of 2023, the record for most Europe Music Awards won is held by Justin Bieber, who has amassed 22 awards. For a female artist, the record for most Europe Music Awards won belongs to Taylor Swift, who has amassed 19 awards. The record for most Europe Music Awards won by a single group and male group belongs to BTS with 14 awards. The record for the most awards held by a girl group belongs to Little Mix, with 7 award wins.

Most wins (as of 2024)

Artist	Years	Number of awards	Awards Won
Justin Bieber	2010–2016	22	Best Male (6),Best Canadian Act (4), Best Pop (2), Best North American Act (2), Biggest Fans (2), Best World Stage Performance (1), Best Song (1), Best Collaboration (1), Best Look (1), Best Push Act, MTV Voice Award.
Taylor Swift	2012–2024	19	Best US Act (4), Best Video (4), Best Live (3), Best Artist (3), Best Female (1), Best Pop (1), Best Look (1), Best Song (1), Best Longform Video (1).
Eminem	1999–2017	14	Best Hip Hop (10), Best Male (2), Best Album (2), Global Icon Award.
BTS	2015–2022	14	Biggest Fans (5), Best Group (4), Best Korean Act (1), Best K-Pop (1), Best Pop (1), Best Song (1), Best Virtual Live (1).
Lady Gaga	2009–2020	12	Best Female (3), Best Song (2), Best Pop (1), Best Video (1), Biggest Fans (1), Best Artist (1), Best Look (1), Best US Act (1), Best New Act.
Nicki Minaj	2012–2023	12	Best Hip Hop (8), Best Song (1), Best Collaboration (1), Best Look (1), Best US Act (1).
One Direction	2012–2015	12	Best UK & Ireland Act (3), Best Pop (3), Biggest Fans (2), Best European Act (2), Best Live (1), Best New Act.
Shawn Mendes	2015–2019	11	Best Artist (2), Best Canadian Act (3), Biggest Fans (1), Best Worldwide Act (1), Best Live (1), Best Song (1), Best Male (1), Best Push, Best New Act.
Linkin Park	2002–2014	10	Best Rock (5), Best Group (2), Best World Stage Performance (2), Best Live Act (1).

Most nominations (as of 2024)

65 nominations

- Taylor Swift

52 nominations

- Justin Bieber

43 nominations

- Ariana Grande

42 nominations

- Beyoncé
- Lady Gaga

37 nominations

- Eminem

34 nominations

- Katy Perry

32 nominations

- Nicki Minaj

31 nominations

- Coldplay

30 nominations

- Rihanna

24 nominations

- Robbie Williams (22 solo; 2 with Take That)

23 nominations

- Kanye West

22 nominations

- Linkin Park

21 nominations

- BTS
- David Guetta

20 nominations

- Justin Timberlake

== Performances ==
Year	Performers (chronologically)
1994	George Michael; Aerosmith; Roxette; Take That; Björk; Ennio Marchetto; Eros Ramazzotti; Therapy?; Ace of Base; Tom Jones; Prince
1995	Simply Red; East 17; H-Blockx; David Bowie; Blur; Bon Jovi; The Cranberries; MC Solaar & Diana King; Take That
1996	The Fugees; George Michael; Boyzone; Eros Ramazzotti; The Smashing Pumpkins; Simply Red; Kula Shaker; Metallica; Garbage; Bryan Adams
1997	U2; Björk; Spice Girls; Skunk Anansie; LL Cool J; Blackstreet; Bon Jovi; Aerosmith; Backstreet Boys; Jovanotti
1998	Faithless (featuring Sally Bradshaw); Madonna; Busta Rhymes; Manic Street Preachers; Aqua; Pras (featuring Destiny's Child & The Product G&B); Five; Rammstein; All Saints; R.E.M.; Robbie Williams
1999	Iggy Pop; Mariah Carey (featuring Missy Elliott & Da Brat); Underworld; Britney Spears; The Offspring; Jamiroquai; Whitney Houston; Puff Daddy; Ligabue; The Corrs; The Cardigans; Marilyn Manson
2000	U2; All Saints; Madonna; Spice Girls; Robbie Williams & Kylie Minogue; Moby; Jennifer Lopez; Ronan Keating; Guano Apes; Backstreet Boys; Bomfunk MCs; Ricky Martin; Anastacia
2001	Kylie Minogue; Dido; Basement Jaxx; Blink-182; Craig David; Mary J. Blige; Jay-Z; Depeche Mode; Fred Durst; Rammstein; R.E.M.; Travis; P!nk; Nelly Furtado; Shaggy
2002	Röyksopp; Pink; Eminem; Foo Fighters; Christina Aguilera; Whitney Houston; Bon Jovi; Enrique Iglesias; Coldplay; Robbie Williams; Wyclef Jean (featuring City High & Loon); Moby; Alicia Keys; Sophie Ellis-Bextor; The Calling
2003	Christina Aguilera; Beyoncé (featuring Sean Paul); Kylie Minogue; Missy Elliott; The Black Eyed Peas; Travis; The Chemical Brothers & The Flaming Lips; Dido; Kraftwerk; The Darkness; The White Stripes; Pink; Justin Timberlake
2004	Eminem; Franz Ferdinand; Maroon 5; Usher & Alicia Keys; Beastie Boys; Gwen Stefani; Anastacia; Nelly (featuring Pharrell); The Hives; Tiziano Ferro; Kanye West; Jamelia; Linkin Park; Outkast
2005	Madonna; Coldplay; The Pussycat Dolls; Gorillaz; Akon; Green Day; Robbie Williams; The Black Eyed Peas; Foo Fighters; Shakira; System of a Down; Goldfrapp; John Legend
2006	Justin Timberlake; Nelly Furtado; Muse; The Killers; Keane; P. Diddy & Cassie; Rihanna; Snoop Dogg; Outlandish; Jet; Lordi; Gnarls Barkley; Kanye West
2007	Foo Fighters; Mika; Avril Lavigne; My Chemical Romance; Amy Winehouse; will.i.am; Nicole Scherzinger (featuring will.i.am); Babyshambles; Bedwetters; Tokio Hotel; Nelly Furtado; Muse
2008	Katy Perry; Beyoncé; Take That; The Killers; Kanye West & Estelle; The Ting Tings; Kid Rock; Duffy; Pink; Leona Lewis
2009	Green Day; Katy Perry; Beyoncé; Jay-Z & Bridget Kelly; Foo Fighters; Mike Ingham; U2; Shakira; Tokio Hotel; Leona Lewis; U2 & Jay-Z; Placebo; Pixie Lott
2010	Shakira (featuring Dizzee Rascal); Thirty Seconds to Mars (featuring Kanye West); Kings of Leon; Katy Perry; Rihanna; Kid Rock; Miley Cyrus; Linkin Park; B.o.B (featuring Hayley Williams); Plan B; Kesha; Bon Jovi; Paramore
2011	Coldplay; LMFAO (featuring Lauren Bennett & GoonRock); Bruno Mars; Jessie J (featuring Paul Clark); Red Hot Chili Peppers; Lady Gaga; Selena Gomez & the Scene; Snow Patrol; Justin Bieber; David Guetta (featuring Taio Cruz, Ludacris & Jessie J); Queen + Adam Lambert; Katy Perry
2012	Rita Ora; Fun; Carly Rae Jepsen; Alicia Keys; No Doubt; The Killers; Psy; Muse; Pitbull; Cro; Taylor Swift; Lana Del Rey; Kanye West
2013	Miley Cyrus; Robin Thicke (featuring Iggy Azalea); Katy Perry; Miley Cyrus; Kings of Leon; Bruno Mars; De Jeugd van Tegenwoordig; Snoop Dogg & Afrojack; Eminem; The Killers; Imagine Dragons; Icona Pop; Calvin Harris; Rudimental
2014	Ariana Grande; Kiesza; Royal Blood; Charli XCX; U2; Nicki Minaj; Ed Sheeran; Enrique Iglesias & Gente de Zona; Alicia Keys; Slash (featuring Myles Kennedy, The Conspirators & Simon Neil); Ozzy Osbourne; Afrojack
2015	Macklemore & Ryan Lewis; Jason Derulo; Ellie Goulding; Twenty One Pilots; Rudimental & Ed Sheeran; Justin Bieber; Jess Glynne; James Bay; Tori Kelly & Andrea Bocelli; Pharrell Williams; Afrojack; Duran Duran; Mark Ronson; Martin Garrix
2016	Bruno Mars; DNCE; Martin Garrix & Bebe Rexha; Shawn Mendes; Zara Larsson; Green Day; The Weeknd; Kings of Leon; Bebe Rexha; Lukas Graham; Afrojack; OneRepublic; Green Day; Anne-Marie; Tinie Tempah; G-Eazy
2017	Eminem (featuring Skylar Grey); Liam Payne; Camila Cabello; Demi Lovato; Stormzy; Rita Ora; Shawn Mendes; Clean Bandit (featuring Zara Larsson, Julia Michaels & Anne-Marie); U2; French Montana (featuring Swae Lee); Travis Scott; The Killers; Kesha; David Guetta (featuring Charli XCX & French Montana); Lana Del Rey
2018	Nicki Minaj & Little Mix; Panic! at the Disco; Rosalía; Hailee Steinfeld; Muse; Janet Jackson; Bebe Rexha; Halsey; Jason Derulo and David Guetta (featuring Nicki Minaj); Alessia Cara; Jack & Jack; Marshmello (featuring Anne-Marie and Bastille)
2019	Dua Lipa; Mabel; Niall Horan; Akon & Becky G; Green Day; Halsey; Ava Max; Rosalía; NCT 127; Becky G; Liam Gallagher; Sofia Reyes; Pabllo Vittar; Jhay Cortez
2020	Doja Cat; Jack Harlow; Sam Smith; David Guetta (featuring Raye); Maluma (featuring Aya Nakamura); DaBaby; Little Mix; Alicia Keys; Tate McRae; Karol G; Yungblud; Zara Larsson; DJ Khaled; Madison Beer; Why Don't We; 24kGoldn (featuring Iann Dior)
2021	Ed Sheeran; Saweetie; Imagine Dragons and JID; Griff; Girl in Red; OneRepublic; Maluma & Rayvanny; Måneskin; Kim Petras; Yungblud; Joel Corry; JC Stewart
2022	Ava Max; Bebe Rexha; David Guetta; Gayle; Gorillaz; Kalush Orchestra; Lewis Capaldi; Muse; OneRepublic; Spinall, Äyanna and Nasty C; Stormzy; Tate McRae
~~2023~~	Anne-Marie; Coi Leray; David Guetta; Jung Kook; Manuel Turizo; Ozuna; Rema; Reneé Rapp; Sabrina Carpenter; Thirty Seconds to Mars; The Kid Laroi
2024	Benson Boone; Busta Rhymes; Le Sserafim; Peso Pluma (featuring Estevan Plazola); Pet Shop Boys; Raye; Shawn Mendes; Teddy Swims; Tyla; The Warning

== See also ==
- MTV Video Music Award
- Viacom International Media Networks Europe

Comparable awards in other countries and regions:

- TMF Awards (Belgium)
- VIVA Comet Awards (Germany)
- VIVA Comet Awards (Hungary)
- MTV Italian Music Awards
- TMF Awards (Netherlands)
- VIVA Comet Awards (Poland)
- MTV Romania Music Awards
- MTV Russia Music Awards
- MTV Millennial Awards
