= MTV Europe Music Award for Best Look =

Category of MTV Europe Music Awards

The following is a list of the MTV Europe Music Award winners and nominees for Best Look.

== 2010s ==
Year	Artist	Ref
2012
2012	Taylor Swift	
2012	Jack White	
2012	ASAP Rocky	
2012	Rihanna	
2012	Nicki Minaj	
2013
2013	Harry Styles	
2013	Lady Gaga	
2013	Justin Timberlake	
2013	Rihanna	
2013	Rita Ora	
2014
2014	Katy Perry	
2014	Taylor Swift	
2014	Iggy Azalea	
2014	Nicki Minaj	
2014	Rita Ora	
2015
2015	Justin Bieber	
2015	Taylor Swift	
2015	Nicki Minaj	
2015	Rita Ora	
2015	Macklemore & Ryan Lewis	
2016
2016	Lady Gaga	
2016	Bebe Rexha	
2016	Sia	
2016	Rihanna	
2016	Beyoncé	
2017
2017	Zayn	
2017	Taylor Swift	
2017	Dua Lipa	
2017	Harry Styles	
2017	Rita Ora	
2018
2018	Nicki Minaj	
2018	Cardi B	
2018	Dua Lipa	
2018	Migos	
2018	Post Malone	
2019
2019	Halsey	
2019	J Balvin	
2019	Lil Nas X	
2019	Lizzo	
2019	Rosalía	

== See also ==
- List of fashion awards
