= Chen Yifaer =

Chinese Internet personality and YouTuber

陈一发儿
- Born: October 13th Chongqing, China
- Other names: Chen Yifa, thebs
- Occupations: YouTuber; Twitch streamer

Twitch information
- Channel: 陈一发儿放映室
- Years active: 2021–present
- Genres: Chatting; Singing; Gaming
- Games: Resident Evil Franchise; Elden Ring; God of War Ragnarök
- Followers: 60.8 thousand

YouTube information
- Channel: 陈一发儿
- Years active: 2020–present
- Genres: Chatting; Singing; Gaming
- Subscribers: 440 thousand
- Views: 27,939,461
- Last updated: Jun 3, 2025
- Website: Chen Yifaer on X

Chen Yifaer (Chinese: 陈一发儿; pinyin: Chén Yīfār), sometimes known as Chen Yifa, is a Chinese YouTuber and Internet live streamer. She made her first live stream on DouYu (Chinese: 斗鱼) on September 11, 2014, and rose to fame for her Internet single "Fairytale Town"(童话镇) in 2016.

Chen's career as a live streamer ended abruptly on July 31, 2018, when her comments on the Nanjing Massacre in 2016 caused major outrage in China. Regarding the Nanjing Massacre, Chen read one of the danmu, which said "Japanese soldiers' blades were so sharp". During a later stream, she described one game scene as "bowing to Yasukuni Shrine", referring to the controversial shrine honoring Japanese soldiers, including convicted war criminals.

Chen Yifaer resumed her live stream career on YouTube and Twitch early 2021, following a hiatus of more than two years.
