= Feng Timo =

Chinese singer and internet personality (born 1991)

Feng Timo 冯提莫
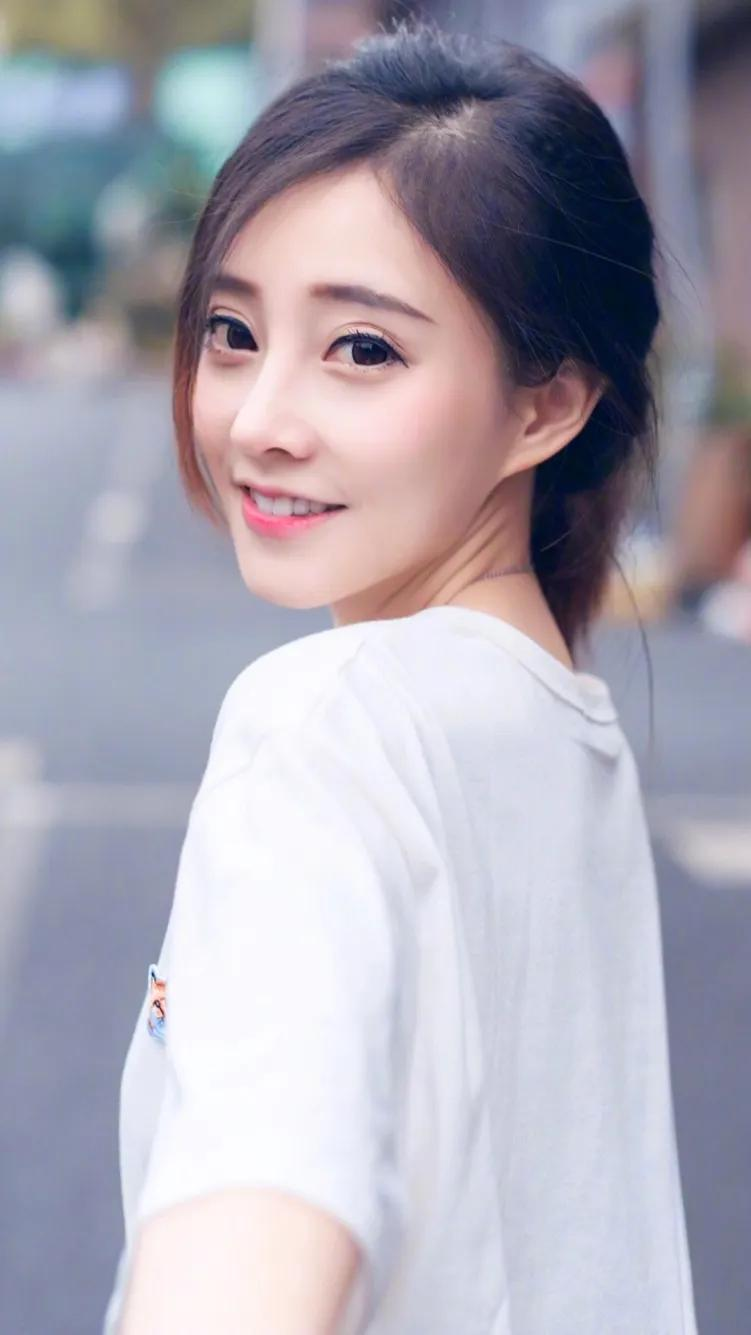
- Born: Feng Yanan (冯亚男); December 19, 1991 (age 34); Wanzhou, Chongqing, China
- Education: Beijing Normal University
- Occupations: Singer; network anchor
- Years active: 2014-2023, 2025-present

Chinese name
- Traditional Chinese: 馮提莫
- Simplified Chinese: 冯提莫
Transcriptions
Standard Mandarin
- Hanyu Pinyin: Féng Tímò
- Musical career
- Genre: Mandopop
- Website: Feng Timo's official Weibo

Feng Timo (Chinese: 冯提莫; pinyin: Féng Tímò, born December 19, 1991), originally named Feng Yanan (Chinese: 冯亚男; pinyin: Féng Yànán), is a Chinese singer and internet personality from Wanzhou District, Chongqing, China. In 2017 she was named one of the "Top 10 Influential Big V's (Verified accounts) of Sina Weibo".

As of October 2018, Feng Timo has over 17.5 million followers on her live room on the live-streaming site Douyu. She also has over 8.4 million followers on Sina Weibo (as of 28 September 2018).

== Career ==
=== Career as an anchor and a singer ===
In 2014, Feng Timo graduated from Beijing Normal University Zhuhai Campus and began her career as a college teacher at Chongqing Vocational School in Wanzhou, Chongqing. In September 2014, she launched her career as a network anchor.

In September 2016, Timo covered Tanya Chua's song "Don't Trouble Me" (Chinese: 别找我麻烦). In December that year, she sang the theme song "You Don't Understand Me" (你不懂我) for the film Suddenly Seventeen (28岁未成年).

She released her first single, "Food of Heroes" (识食物者为俊杰), in June 2017. In November, she appeared in a concert of "League of Legends" with Chen Yifa and A Leng (阿冷). In December, she sang the theme song "The Return of the Exes" (再见前任) for the film The Ex-File 3: The Return of the Exes (前任3：再见前任). In September 2018, her single "Blowing the Sea Breeze" (吹海风) was released. In November 2018, her single "Heart-shaped Universe" (心形宇宙) was released as an interlude song of television series Ever Night (将夜). On December 31, 2018, Feng appeared on the grand ceremony of Mask Singer (蒙面唱将猜猜猜).

Feng has appeared on the variety show Make Progress Every Day, and served as a judge on 2018 Miss Chongqing (2018重庆小姐大赛).

In February 2019, Feng appeared on the Nasdaq Screen on the Times Square, New York City, US. She also became a "Live+Performance" promotion ambassador of China Performance Guild.

In July 2023, she revealed she suffered late-stage thyroid cancer and would be starting operation and treatments, with her career on hold. On December 10, 2025, she returns on Chinese version of Tiktok and revealed that the cancer is in remission, her contract with the original agency has ended, and she intends to start her own agency to mentor new live streamers.

=== Charities and public benefits ===
In May 2018, Feng worked with the Chongqing Communist Youth League as a Promotion Ambassador. In July 2018, Feng took part in activity "Persistence under High Temperature" of Douyu, and worked with traffic polices; In August, she took part in the 9th Qinling Panda Tourism Festival and Benefit Concert; In September, she worked as the Tourism Promotion Ambassador of Hechuan District, Chongqing.

== Discography ==
=== Covers ===
Name	Time of release	References
"Don't Trouble Me" (Chinese: 别找我麻烦) (Cover Tanya Chua)	September 7, 2016	
"Super Star"	December 19, 2018	

=== Singles ===
Name	Time of release	References
"You Don't Understand Me" (Chinese: 你不懂我)	December 12, 2016	
"The Food is Junjie" (Chinese: 识食物者为俊杰)	June 30, 2017	
"The Return of the Exes" (Chinese: 再见前任)	December 22, 2017	
"The Buddha Girl" (Chinese: 佛系少女)	February 18, 2018	
"Blowing the Sea Breeze" (Chinese: 吹海风)	September 1, 2018	
"Deja vu" (Chinese: 既视感)	November 1, 2018	
"Heart-shaped Universe" (Chinese: 心形宇宙)	November 23, 2018	
"Full of Vitality" (Chinese: 元气满满)	February 2, 2019	
"See the Wind" (Chinese: 看到风)	April 3, 2019	

== Awards ==
=== Comprehensive Awards ===
Award name	Time	References
"Top 10 Influential Big V's of Sina Weibo"	December 7, 2017	
"The Most Popular Network Anchor"	December 21, 2017	
"Top 10 Network Hosts of Douyu"	January 13, 2018	
"The Best New Artist"	November 3, 2018	
"The Best Social Media Musician"	January 6, 2019	
"Live+Performance promotion ambassador"	February 27, 2019	
"The Most Influential Network Anchor"	March 21, 2019	
"The Most Popular Cross-vocation Musician"	March 21, 2019	
"The Most Commercial Value We-Media"	March 21, 2019	

=== Awards of Songs ===
Award name	Song name	Time	References
"Top 10 Golden Songs of the 26th Eastern Music Festival"	"The Buddha Girl" (Chinese: 佛系少女)	March 25, 2019	
