= MTV Europe Music Award for Best UK & Ireland Act =

Category of MTV Europe Music Awards

MTV Europe Music Award for Best UK and Ireland Act
- Country: Europe
- Presented by: MTV
- First award: 1994
- Currently held by: Raye (2024)

Highlights
- Most wins: Little Mix (6)
- Most nominations: Little Mix (7)
- Website: ema.mtv.tv/

The MTV Europe Music Award for the best UK & Ireland act has been a regional category since 1998 and have been won by 18 different acts

The last Irish winners to win in this category was Westlife in 2000. Before 2024, when Hozier became one of the nominees, the Irish band The Thrills, which received a nomination in 2003, were the last Irish nominees in the category. British boy band One Direction, which includes an Irish member, Niall Horan, won the Awards in 2012, 2013, and 2014. British girl group Little Mix is currently the most awarded and nominated act and female group in this category, winning a of total six times out of seven nominations.

The following is a list of the MTV Europe Music Award winners and nominees for Best UK & Ireland Act.

== Winners and nominees ==
Winners are listed first and highlighted in bold.

† indicates the Wildcard–winning artist.

=== 1990s ===
Year	Artist	Nationality	Ref
1994
1994	**Oasis ^{[a]}**	**England**	
1994	**An Emotional Fish ^{[b]}**	**Ireland**	
1998
1998	**Five ^{[c]}**	**England**	
1998	Another Level	England	
1998	B*Witched	Ireland	
1998	Billie	England	
1998	Steps	England	
1999
1999	**Boyzone**	**Ireland**	
1999	Basement Jaxx	England	
1999	Lynden David Hall	England	
1999	Manic Street Preachers	Wales	
1999	Texas	Scotland	
1999	Westlife	Ireland	

=== 2000s ===
Year	Artist	Nationality	Ref
2000
2000	**Westlife**	**Ireland**	
2000	Craig David	England	
2000	Sonique	England	
2000	Travis	Scotland	
2000	Robbie Williams	England	
2001
2001	**Craig David**	**England**	
2001	Artful Dodger	England	
2001	Feeder	Wales	
2001	Gorillaz	England	
2001	S Club 7	England	
2002
2002	**Coldplay**	**England**	
2002	Atomic Kitten	England	
2002	Ms. Dynamite	England	
2002	Sugababes	England	
2002	Underworld	England	
2003
2003	**The Darkness ^{[d]}**	**England**	
2003	The Coral	England	
2003	Funeral for a Friend	Wales	
2003	The Libertines	England	
2003	The Thrills	Ireland	
2004
2004	**Muse**	**England**	
2004	Natasha Bedingfield	England	
2004	Franz Ferdinand	Scotland	
2004	Jamelia	England	
2004	The Streets	England	
2005
2005	**Coldplay**	**England**	
2005	James Blunt	England	
2005	Gorillaz	England	
2005	Kaiser Chiefs	England	
2005	Stereophonics	Wales	
2006
2006	**The Kooks**	**England**	
2006	Lily Allen	England	
2006	Arctic Monkeys	England	
2006	Muse	England	
2006	Corrine Bailey Rae	England	
2007
2007	**Muse**	**England**	
2007	Arctic Monkeys	England	
2007	Klaxons	England	
2007	Mark Ronson	England	
2007	Amy Winehouse	England	
2008
2008	**Leona Lewis ^{[e]}**	**England**	
2008	Adele	England	
2008	Duffy	Wales	
2008	The Ting Tings	England	
2008	The Wombats	England	
2009
2009	**Pixie Lott ^{[e]}**	**England**	
2009	Florence and the Machine	England	
2009	La Roux	England	
2009	The Saturdays	England	
2009	Tinchy Stryder	England	

=== 2010s ===
Year	Artist	Nationality	Ref
2010
2010	**Marina and the Diamonds ^{[e]}**	**Wales**	
2010	Delphic	England	
2010	Ellie Goulding	England	
2010	Rox	England	
2010	Tinie Tempah	England	
2011
2011	**Adele**	**England**	
2011	Coldplay	England	
2011	Florence and the Machine	England	
2011	Jessie J	England	
2011	Kasabian	England	
2012
2012	**One Direction**	**Europe**	
2012	Conor Maynard	England	
2012	Jessie J	England	
2012	Ed Sheeran	England	
2012	Rita Ora	England	
2013
2013	**One Direction**	**Europe**	
2013	Ellie Goulding	England	
2013	Calvin Harris	Scotland	
2013	Olly Murs	England	
2013	Rudimental	England	
2014
2014	**One Direction**	**Europe**	
2014	Sam Smith	England	
2014	Calvin Harris	Scotland	
2014	Ed Sheeran	England	
2014	Cheryl Cole †	England	
2014	Wildcard nominations: Rita Ora; Clean Bandit; Coldplay; Arctic Monkeys; The Vamps		
2015
2015	**Little Mix †**	**England**	
2015	Jess Glynne	England	
2015	One Direction	Europe	
2015	Years & Years	England	
2015	Ed Sheeran	England	
2015	Wildcard nominations: Sam Smith; Ellie Goulding; Tinie Tempah; Calvin Harris; James Bay		
2016
2016	**Little Mix**	**England**	
2016	Adele	England	
2016	Years & Years †	England	
2016	Coldplay	England	
2016	Zayn	England	
2016	Wildcard nominations: Bastille; Calvin Harris; Craig David; Skepta		
2017
2017	**Louis Tomlinson †**	**England**	
2017	Dua Lipa	England	
2017	Ed Sheeran	England	
2017	Little Mix	England	
2017	Stormzy	England	
2017	Wildcard nominations: Calvin Harris; Clean Bandit; Coldplay; Harry Styles; Jonas Blue; Liam Payne; Niall Horan; Rag'n'Bone Man; Zayn		
2018
2018	**Little Mix †**	**England**	
2018	Anne-Marie	England	
2018	Dua Lipa	England	
2018	George Ezra	England	
2018	Stormzy	England	
2018	Wildcard nominations: Calvin Harris; Clean Bandit; Ed Sheeran; Jonas Blue; Rita Ora		
2019
2019	**Little Mix †**	**England**	
2019	Lewis Capaldi	Scotland	
2019	Dave	England	
2019	Mabel	England	
2019	Ed Sheeran	England	
2019	Wildcard nominations: Calvin Harris; Jax Jones; Sam Smith; Stormzy; The 1975		

=== 2020s ===
Year	Artist	Nationality	Ref
2020
2020	**Little Mix** †	**England**	
2020	Dave	England	
2020	Dua Lipa	England	
2020	Harry Styles	England	
2020	Stormzy	England	
2020	Wildcard nominations: AJ Tracey; Joel Corry; Jorja Smith; Lewis Capaldi; The 1975		
2021
2021	**Little Mix** †	**England**	
2021	Dave	England	
2021	Dua Lipa	England	
2021	Ed Sheeran	England	
2021	KSI	England	
2022
2022	**Harry Styles**	**England**	
2022	Adele	England	
2022	Cat Burns	England	
2022	Dave	England	
2022	Lewis Capaldi	Scotland	
2023
2023	**Tom Grennan**	**England**	
2023	Calvin Harris	Scotland	
2023	Central Cee	England	
2023	PinkPantheress	England	
2023	Raye	England	
2023	Sam Smith	England	
2024
2024	**Raye**	**England**	
2024	Central Cee	England	
2024	Charli XCX	England	
2024	Chase & Status	England	
2024	Dua Lipa	England	
2024	Hozier	Ireland	

Notes
^{^[a]}Local Hero Award — UK
^{^[b]}Local Hero Award — Ireland
^{^[c]}MTV Select — UK and Ireland
^{^[d]}Best MTV2 UK Act
^{^[e]}Best UK & Ireland New Act

== Performers with multiple awards ==
6 awards

- Little Mix (4 consecutive)

3 awards

- One Direction (consecutive)

2 awards

- Coldplay
- Muse

== Performers with multiple nominations ==
7 nominations

- Little Mix

5 nominations

- Ed Sheeran
- Dua Lipa

4 nominations

- One Direction
- Coldplay

3 nominations

- Adele
- Calvin Harris
- Dave
- Muse
- Stormzy

2 nominations

- Jessie J
- Florence and the Machine
- Ellie Goulding
- Years & Years
- Craig David
- Gorillaz
- Arctic Monkeys
- Raye
- Westlife

== See also ==
- Best UK Video at MTV Video Music Awards
- Brit Awards
