= List of English artists nominated for MTV Europe Music Awards =

The following is a list of English artists nominated for MTV Europe Music Awards. List does not include MTV Europe Music Award for Best UK & Ireland Act, New Sounds of Europe or MTV Europe Music Award for Best European Act. Winners are in bold text.

Year	Nomination	Artist
1994	Best Song	Blur
1994	**Best Group**	Take That
1994	**Best Dance**	The Prodigy
1994	Best Cover	Pet Shop Boys
1994	Best Male	Seal
1995	Best Song	Seal
1995	Best Group	Blur
1995	**Best Dance**	East 17
1995	**Best Director**	Massive Attack
1995	Best Female	PJ Harvey
1995	**Best Live Act**	Take That
1995	Best Live Act	The Prodigy
1995	Best Live Act	The Rolling Stones
1995	Best Breakthrough Act	Portishead
1995	Best Rock	Oasis
1996	**Best Song**	Oasis
1996	Best Rock	Oasis
1996	**Best Group**	Oasis
1996	Best Group	Pulp
1996	Best Breakthrough Act	Pulp
1996	Best Song	Pulp
1996	**Best Dance**	The Prodigy
1996	Best Dance	Everything but the Girl
1996	Best Dance	Mark Morrison
1996	Select	Jamiroquai
1996	Select	Oasis
1996	Select	Spice Girls
1996	Amour	Massive Attack
1996	Amour	George Michael
1996	**Best Male**	George Michael
1996	Best Breakthrough Act	Skunk Anansie
1997	**Best Group**	Spice Girls
1997	Best Group	The Prodigy
1997	**Best Alternative**	The Prodigy
1997	**Best Dance**	The Prodigy
1997	**Best Video**	The Prodigy
1997	Best Group	Oasis
1997	Best Rock	Oasis
1997	Best Group	Radiohead
1997	Best Alternative	Radiohead
1997	Best Live Act	Radiohead
1997	Best Video	Radiohead
1997	Best Dance	The Chemical Brothers
1997	Select	Spice Girls
1997	Best Breakthrough Act	Spice Girls
1997	Best Dance	Spice Girls
1997	Best Video	Blur
1997	Best Alternative	Blur
1997	Best Video	The Chemical Brothers
1997	Best Male	George Michael
1997	Best Rock	Skunk Anansie
1997	Best Live Act	Skunk Anansie
1997	Best Rock	Bush
1997	Best Alternative	The Verve
1998	Best Song	All Saints
1998	Best Breakthrough Act	All Saints
1998	Best Album	All Saints
1998	Best Group	All Saints
1998	Best Song	Cornershop
1998	Best Song	Robbie Williams
1998	**Best Video**	Massive Attack
1998	**Best Group**	Spice Girls
1998	**Best Pop**	Spice Girls
1998	**Best Dance**	The Prodigy
1998	Best Dance	Dario G
1998	Best Dance	Faithless
1998	Best Dance	Fatboy Slim
1998	Best Album	Massive Attack
1998	Best Album	Robbie Williams
1998	**Best Male**	Robbie Williams
1998	Best Breakthrough Act	Five
1998	Best Pop	Five
1999	Best Song	George Michael
1999	Best Group	Jamiroquai
1999	Best Dance	Fatboy Slim
1999	Best Dance	Basement Jaxx
1999	**Best Dance**	The Chemical Brothers
1999	Best Dance	Jamiroquai
1999	Best Pop	Five
1999	**Best Video**	Blur
1999	Best Video	George Michael
1999	Best Male	George Michael
1999	Best Video	Fatboy Slim
1999	Best Female	Geri Halliwell
1999	Best Male	Robbie Williams
2000	**Best Song**	Robbie Williams
2000	Best Video	Robbie Williams
2000	Best Male	Robbie Williams
2000	Best Song	Melanie C
2000	Best New Act	Melanie C
2000	Best Song	Sonique
2000	Best Dance	Sonique
2000	Best New Act	Sonique
2000	Best Dance	Artful Dodger
2000	Best Dance	Moloko
2000	Best Female	Melanie C
2000	**Best Pop**	All Saints
2001	**Best Song**	Gorillaz
2001	Best Group	Gorillaz
2001	**Best Dance**	Gorillaz
2001	Web Award	Gorillaz
2001	Best Video	Gorillaz
2001	Best New Act	Gorillaz
2001	Best Pop	Atomic Kitten
2001	Best Song	Dido
2001	Best Female	Dido
2001	Best Album	Dido
2001	Best New Act	Dido
2001	Best Dance	Basement Jaxx
2001	Best Dance	Faithless
2001	Best R&B	Craig David
2001	Best Male	Craig David
2001	Best New Act	Craig David
2001	Web Award	Depeche Mode
2001	Best Video	Fatboy Slim
2001	Best Video	Robbie Williams
2001	**Best Male**	Robbie Williams
2002	Best Group	Coldplay
2002	Best Album	Coldplay
2002	Best Rock	Coldplay
2002	Best Live Act	Depeche Mode
2002	Best Dance	Sophie Ellis-Bextor
2002	Web Award	David Bowie
2002	Best Video	Basement Jaxx
2002	Best Male	Robbie Williams
2003	**Best Group**	Coldplay
2003	Best Group	Radiohead
2003	**Best Dance**	Panjabi MC
2003	Best Dance	The Chemical Brothers
2003	Best Dance	Paul Oakenfold
2003	Best R&B	Craig David
2003	Best Male	Craig David
2003	Best Album	Robbie Williams
2003	Best Male	Robbie Williams
2003	Best Pop	Robbie Williams
2003	Web Award	Goldfrapp
2003	Best Video	U.N.K.L.E.
2004	Best Album	Dido
2004	Best Video	The Cure
2004	Best Video	The Streets
2004	Best Male	Robbie Williams
2004	Best Pop	Robbie Williams
2004	Best New Act	Jamelia
2004	Best New Act	Keane
2004	Best Alternative	The Prodigy
2004	**Best Alternative**	Muse
2004	Best Rock	The Darkness
2005	**Best Song**	Coldplay
2005	Best Group	Coldplay
2005	Best Album	Coldplay
2005	Best Rock	Coldplay
2005	Best Song	James Blunt
2005	Best Song	The Chemical Brothers
2005	**Best Video**	The Chemical Brothers
2005	Best Song	Gorillaz
2005	**Best Group**	Gorillaz
2005	Best Video	Gorillaz
2005	**Best Male**	Robbie Williams
2005	Best Pop	Robbie Williams
2005	Best Alternative	Bloc Party
2005	Best Alternative	Goldfrapp
2005	Best New Act	James Blunt
2005	Best New Act	Kaiser Chiefs
2006	**Best Group**	Depeche Mode
2006	Best Group	Keane
2006	Best Rock	Keane
2006	**Best Alternative**	Muse
2006	Best Album	Muse
2006	**Best Video**	Simian
2006	Best Male	Robbie Williams
2006	Best Pop	Robbie Williams
2006	Best Alternative	Arctic Monkeys
2007	Most Addictive Track	Mika
2007	Best Solo	Mika
2007	Best Album	Amy Winehouse
2007	Artist's Choice	Amy Winehouse
2007	Best Song	Amy Winehouse
2007	Headliner	Arctic Monkeys
2007	**Headliner**	Muse
2007	Web Award	Depeche Mode
2007	Best Video	Bat for Lashes
2007	Best Video	The Chemical Brothers
2008	Most Addictive Track	Coldplay
2008	Best Album	Coldplay
2008	Best Album	Leona Lewis
2008	Headliner	The Cure
2008	Best Act	Coldplay
2008	Best Act	Leona Lewis
2008	Best Act	Amy Winehouse
2008	Best Act Ever	Rick Astley
2008	Ultimate Legend Award	Paul McCartney
2009	Best Female	Leona Lewis
2009	Best Male	Robbie Williams
2009	Best World Stage Performance	Coldplay
2009	Best Male	Mika
2009	Best New Act	La Roux
2009	Best Push Act	La Roux
2009	Best New Act	Pixie Lott
2009	**Best Push Act**	Pixie Lott
2009	Best Alternative	Muse
2009	**Best Alternative**	Placebo
2009	Best Alternative	The Prodigy
2009	Best Push Act	White Lies
2009	Best Push Act	Little Boots
2010	Best Video	Plan B
2010	Best New Act	Plan B
2010	Best Rock	Muse
2010	Live Act	Muse
2010	Best World Stage Performance	Muse
2010	Best Rock	Ozzy Osbourne
2010	Best Alternative	Gorillaz
2010	Best Push Act	Alexandra Burke
2010	Best Push Act	Hurts
2010	Best Push Act	Professor Green
2010	Best World Stage Performance	Gorillaz
2011	Best Song	Adele
2011	Best Video	Adele
2011	Best Female	Adele
2011	Global Icon	Queen
2011	Best New Act	Jessie J
2011	Best Push Act	Jessie J
2011	Best Push Act	Katy B
2011	Best Rock	Coldplay
2011	Live Act	Coldplay
2011	Best Alternative	Arctic Monkeys
2011	Best World Stage Performance	Ozzy Osbourne
2012	Best Video	M.I.A.
2012	Best New Act	Rita Ora
2012	Best Push Act	Rita Ora
2012	**Best New Act**	One Direction
2012	Biggest Fans	One Direction
2012	Best Rock	Coldplay
2012	Best Rock	Muse
2012	Live Act	Muse
2012	Best Alternative	Arctic Monkeys
2012	Best World Stage Performance	Arctic Monkeys
2012	Best Alternative	Florence and the Machine
2012	Best Push Act	Rebecca Ferguson
2012	Best Push Act	Michael Kiwanuka
2012	Best Push Act	Conor Maynard
2012	Best World Stage Performance	Kasabian
2013	Best New Act	Rudimental
2013	Best Push Act	Rudimental
2013	Best New Act	Bastille
2013	Best Push Act	Bastille
2013	Biggest Fans	One Direction
2013	**Best Pop**	One Direction
2013	Best Worldwide Act	One Direction
2013	**Best Look**	Harry Styles
2013	Best Look	Rita Ora
2013	Best World Stage Performance	Rita Ora
2013	Best Rock	Black Sabbath
2013	Best Alternative	Arctic Monkeys
2013	Best Push Act	Tom Odell
2013	Best World Stage Performance	Jessie J
