= List of Irish artists nominated for MTV Europe Music Awards =

The following is a list of Irish artists nominated for MTV Europe Music Awards. List does not include MTV Europe Music Award for Best UK & Ireland Act, New Sounds of Europe or MTV Europe Music Award for Best European Act. Winners are in bold text.

Year	Nomination	Artist	Ref
1994	Best Video	U2	
1994	Best Breakthrough Act	Therapy?	
1994	Best Rock	Therapy?	
1995	**Best Song**	The Cranberries	
1995	Best Rock	Therapy?	
1995	**Best Group**	U2	
1996	Select	Boyzone	
1997	**Best Live Act**	U2	
1997	Best Group	U2	
1998	Best Video	Aphex Twin	
1998	Best Pop	Boyzone	
1999	Best Video	Aphex Twin	
1999	Best Breakthrough Act	Westlife	
1999	Best Pop	Boyzone	
1999	Best Album	Boyzone	
2000	Best Male	Ronan Keating	
2001	Best Rock	U2	
2001	Best Group	U2	
2001	Best Album	U2	
2001	Web Award	U2	
2002	Best Rock	U2	
2002	Best Live Act	U2	
2002	Best Group	U2	
2002	Web Award	U2	
2005	Best Rock	U2	
2005	Best Group	U2	
2005	Best Album	U2	
2008	Best Act Ever	U2	
2009	Best Rock	U2	
2009	**Best Live Act**	U2	
2012	**Best New Act**	One Direction	
2012	**Biggest Fans**	One Direction	
2013	Best Pop	One Direction	
2013	Biggest Fans	One Direction	
2013	Best Worldwide Act	One Direction	
