= List of MTV Europe Music Award categories =

The MTV Europe Music Award are awarded in a series of categories, each of which isolate a specific contribution to the recording industry or geographical region.

Firstly awarded in 1994, in its originating idea, was to promote European local artists, become since 2011 an occasion to honor artists not only from the EMEA region. In 1994 MTV acknowledged local European artists by introducing Local Hero award. Award was discontinued, but since 1998 there was a process of adding awards to regional musicians, starting with United Kingdom/Ireland, Italy, Germany, and Nordics. In 2000 MTV launched awards to French, Spanish, Polish, Dutch. Within the next couple of years, the number of regional award categories systematically increased by adding awards to the musicians from Russia, Romania, Portugal, Sweden, Finland, Denmark, Norway, Adria (former Yugoslavia: Serbia, Slovenia, Croatia, Montenegro, North Macedonia, Bosnia and Hercegovina), Baltics (Lithuania, Latvia, Estonia), Hungary, Ukraine, Turkey, Greece, Switzerland, Czech Republic and Slovakia.

In 2005 award for best African act has been awarded, which was the first case when European in its name award was granted outside to the artists from geographical Europe. In 2007 awarded Arabic artists, and in 2008 awarded best Israeli act.

Since 2007 viewers were able to select Best European Act from the winners of the regional categories, where Israeli act were included, but African and Arabic musicians were excluded from the category.

In 2011 MTV rebranded the award, and removed European from its name, shortening to MTV EMA only. It was the first year when Best Worldwide Act was granted. Award was given to the artists previously awarded in the regional categories for Best European Act, Best North American Act, Best Latin American Act, Best Africa, Middle East and India Act, Best Asian and Pacific Act.

There are only 3 categories that were awarded in every edition: Best Song, Best New Act, Best Rock.

== Current main categories ==
- Best Video
- Best Song
- Best Artist
- Best New Act
- Best Group
- Best Pop
- Best Rock
- Best Hip-Hop
- Best R&B
- Best Alternative
- Best Electronic
- Best Live Act
- Best Push Act
- Best World Stage Performance

== Social media categories ==
- Biggest Fans
- Best Look

== Special awards ==
- Free Your Mind
- Global Icon
- Artist's Choice
- MTV Voice
- Ultimate Legend
- Video Visionary
- Power of Music
- Best Song with a Social Message
- Best Collaboration
- Generation Change

== European regional categories ==
- Best Baltic Act
- Best Belgian Act
- Best Danish Act
- Best Dutch Act
- Best Finnish Act
- Best French Act
- Best German Act
- Best Greek Act
- Best Hungarian Act
- Best Israeli Act
- Best Italian Act
- Best Norwegian Act
- Best Polish Act
- Best Portuguese Act
- Best Romanian Act
- Best Spanish Act
- Best Swedish Act
- Best Swiss Act
- Best UK & Ireland Act
- Best Ukrainian Act

== Non-European regional categories ==
- Best African Act
- Best Middle East Act
- Best Australian Act
- Best Brazilian Act
- Best Canadian Act
- Best Indian Act
- Best Japanese Act
- Best Korean Act
- Best Latin America North Act
- Best Latin America Central Act
- Best Latin America South Act
- Best Mainland China & Hong Kong Act
- Best New Zealander Act
- Best Southeast Asian Act
- Best Taiwanese Act
- Best US Act
- Best Asian Act

== Worldwide categories ==
- Best Africa, Middle East and India Act
- Best Asian Act
- Best European Act
- Best Latin American Act
- Best North American Act
- Best Worldwide Act

== Defunct categories ==
- Best Cover (1994)
- MTV Amour (1996)
- MTV Select (1996–1998)
- Best Hard Rock (2002)
- Best Nordic Act (1999–2004)
- Web Award (2001–2003, 2007)
- Best Album (1998–2008)
- Best Urban (2007–2009)
- Best European Act (2008–2012)
- Best Turkish Act (2007–2009, 2011)
- Best Dutch & Belgian Act (2004–2010)
- Best Romanian & Moldovan Act (2007–2009)
- Best New UK & Ireland Act (2008–2010)
- Best Czech & Slovak Act (2010–2013)
- Best Hungarian Act (2007–2013)
- Best MTV2 UK Act (2003)
- Best Asia and Pacific Act (2011–2012)
- Best Male (1994–2006, 2009–2016)
- Best Female (1994–2006, 2009–2016)
- Best Adria Act (2005-2017)
- Best Russian Act (2004-2021)

== Timeline ==
=== Main categories ===
Editions:	1994	1995	1996	1997	1998	1999	2000	2001	2002	2003	2004	2005	2006	2007	2008	2009	2010	2011	2012	2013	2014	2015	2016	2017	2018	2019	2020	2021	2022
Best Song																													
Best Video																													
Best Longform Video																													
Best New Act																													
Best Female																													
Best Male																													
Best Artist																													
Best Act																													
Best Act Ever																													
Best Group																													
Best Collaboration																													
Best Rock																													
Best Hard Rock																													
Best Alternative																													
Best Dance/Electronic																													
Best Pop																													
Best Rap/Hip-Hop																													
Best R&B																													
Best Urban																													
Best Live																													
Best Virtual Live																													
Best World Stage Performance																													
Best Metaverse Performance																													
Best Album																													
Best Push																													
Artist On The Rise																													
Artist's Choice																													
Best Cover																													
MTV Amour																													
MTV Select																													
Best Song with a Social Message / Video for Good																													
Best Latin																													
Best K-Pop																													

=== Non-music awards ===
Editions:	1994	1995	1996	1997	1998	1999	2000	2001	2002	2003	2004	2005	2006	2007	2008	2009	2010	2011	2012	2013	2014	2015	2016	2017	2018	2019	2020	2021	2022
Best Website																													
Biggest Fans																													
Best Look																													

=== Honorary awards ===
Editions:	1994	1995	1996	1997	1998	1999	2000	2001	2002	2003	2004	2005	2006	2007	2008	2009	2010	2011	2012	2013	2014	2015	2016	2017	2018	2019	2020	2021	2022
Ultimate Legend																													
Global Icon																													
Video Visionary																													
Rock Icon																													

=== Awards for contributions to activism ===
Editions:	1994	1995	1996	1997	1998	1999	2000	2001	2002	2003	2004	2005	2006	2007	2008	2009	2010	2011	2012	2013	2014	2015	2016	2017	2018	2019	2020	2021	2022
Free Your Mind																													
MTV Voices																													
Power of Music																													
Generation Change																													

=== European regional categories ===
Editions:	1994	1995	1996	1997	1998	1999	2000	2001	2002	2003	2004	2005	2006	2007	2008	2009	2010	2011	2012	2013	2014	2015	2016	2017	2018	2019	2020	2021	2022
Best European																													
Best European - East																													
Best European - West																													
Best European - Central																													
Best European - South																													
Best UK & Ireland	^{[a]}				^{[b]}																								
Best German	^{[a]}				^{[b]}																								
Best Italian	^{[a]}				^{[b]}																								
Best French	^{[a]}																												
Best Polish	^{[a]}																												
Best Dutch	^{[a]}																												
Best Dutch & Belgian																													
Best Belgian	^{[a]}																												
Best Spanish																													
Best Nordic																													
Best Norwegian	^{[a]}																												
Best Swedish	^{[a]}																												
Best Finnish																													
Best Danish																													
Best Russian	^{[a]}																												
Best Romanian																													
Best Romanian & Moldovan																													
Best Portuguese																													
Best Adria																													
Best Baltic																													
Best Hungarian																													
Best Ukrainian																													
Best Turkish																													
Best Israeli	^{[a]}																												
Best Greek																													
Best Swiss																													
Best Czech & Slovak	^{[a]}																												

^{^[a]}Local Hero Award
^{^[b]}MTV Select

=== Non-European regional categories ===
Editions:	1994	1995	1996	1997	1998	1999	2000	2001	2002	2003	2004	2005	2006	2007	2008	2009	2010	2011	2012	2013	2014	2015	2016	2017	2018	2019	2020	2021	2022
Best Worldwide																													
Best AMEI/AI																													
Best African																													
Best Arabia/Middle East																													
Best Indian																													
Best North American																													
Best Canadian																													
US Artist About to Go Global																													
Best US																													
Best Latin American																													
Best Brazilian																													
Best Latin America North																													
Best Latin America Central																													
Best Latin America South																													
Best Latin America Caribbean																													
Best Asian & Pacific																													
Best Australia & New Zealand																													
Best Australian																													
Best New Zealander																													
Best Asian																													
Best Japanese																													
Best Korean																													
Best Southeast Asian																													
Best Mainland China&Hong Kong																													
Best Taiwanese																													
Best Greater China																													

== See also ==
- List of Grammy Award categories
