= List of Icelandic artists nominated for MTV Europe Music Awards =

The following is a list of Icelandic artists nominated for MTV Europe Music Awards. Winners are in bold text.

Year	Nomination	Artist	Ref
1994	Best Song	Björk	
1994	Best Female	Björk	
1995	**Best Female**	Björk	
1996	Best Female	Björk	
1997	Best Female	Björk	
1999	Best Video	Björk	
2003	**Best Video**	Sigur Rós	
2004	Best Alternative	Björk	
2012	Best Push Act	Of Monsters and Men	
2015	Best Alternative	Björk	
