= List of Spanish artists nominated for MTV Europe Music Awards =

The following is a list of Spanish artists nominated for MTV Europe Music Awards. List does not include MTV Europe Music Award for Best Spanish Act, New Sounds of Europe or MTV Europe Music Award for Best European Act. Winners are in bold text.

Year	Nomination	Artist	Ref
1996	Best Dance	Los del Río	
2002	Best Pop	Enrique Iglesias	
2002	Best Male	Enrique Iglesias	
2002	Best Song	Enrique Iglesias	
2010	Best Male	Enrique Iglesias	
2011	Best World Stage Performance	Enrique Iglesias	
2014	**Best World Stage Performance**	Enrique Iglesias	
2019	Best Video	Rosalía; El Guincho	
2019	**Best Collaboration**	Rosalía; El Guincho	
2019	Best Look	Rosalía	
2019	Best Push Act	Rosalía	
