= List of Italian artists nominated for MTV Europe Music Awards =

The following is a list of Italian artists nominated for MTV Europe Music Awards. List does not include MTV Europe Music Award for Best Italian Act, New Sounds of Europe or MTV Europe Music Award for Best European Act.

| Year | Nomination | Artist | Ref |
|---|---|---|---|
| 1996 | Best Male | Eros Ramazzotti | |
| 2002 | Best Dance | DB Boulevard | |
| 2013 | Best Worldwide Act | Marco Mengoni | |
| 2021 | Best Rock | Måneskin | |
| 2021 | Best Group | Måneskin | |
| 2022 | Best Rock | Måneskin | |
| 2023 | Best Rock | Måneskin | |
