= MTV Europe Music Award for MTV Select =

Category of MTV Europe Music Awards

The MTV Europe Music Award for MTV Select was created in 1996. The five nominations in this category was selected by the viewers during a special MTV Select Weekend, a nine-hour marathon. Europe's favourite 100 videos were compiled and then were reduced, by viewer votes, to the five nominations for The MTV Europe Music Awards Select category. In 1998 the category was divided into four; MTV Select UK and Ireland, MTV Select Northern, MTV Select Central and MTV Select Southern.

== 1990s ==
| Year | Winner | Nominees |
|---|---|---|
| 1996 | Backstreet Boys — "Get Down (You're the One for Me)" | Boyzone — "Words"; Jamiroquai — "Virtual Insanity"; Oasis — "Don't Look Back in Anger"; Spice Girls — "Wannabe" |
| 1997 | Backstreet Boys — "As Long as You Love Me" | Hanson — "Where's the Love"; Puff Daddy (featuring Faith Evans and 112) — "I'll Be Missing You"; Spice Girls — "Spice Up Your Life" |
| 1998 | MTV Select — UK and Ireland: Five | Another Level; B*Witched; Billie; Steps |
| 1998 | MTV Select — Northern: Eagle Eye Cherry | |
| 1998 | MTV Select — Central: Thomas D and Franka Potente | |
| 1998 | MTV Select — Southern: Bluvertigo | 99 Posse; Articolo 31; Ligabue; Vasco Rossi |
