= 2006 MTV Europe Music Awards =

Music awards show held in Copenhagen, Denmark

- Date: 2 November 2006
- Location: Bella Center, Copenhagen, Denmark
- Hosted by: Justin Timberlake
- Most awards: Gnarls Barkley (2)
- Most nominations: Red Hot Chili Peppers (4)

Television/radio coverage
- Network: MTV Networks International (Europe)

The MTV Europe Music Awards 2006 were held in Copenhagen at the Bella Center. The outside stage hosted a concert that featured The Killers, Keane and Snoop Dogg.

Presenters included Fat Joe, Timbaland and Moby. During the ceremony, Kanye West invaded the stage when Justice vs. Simian went to collect the award for the 'Best Video' category.

== Nominations ==
Winners are in bold text.

| Best Song | Best Video |
|---|---|
| **Gnarls Barkley — "Crazy"**: Nelly Furtado — "Maneater"; Red Hot Chili Peppers — "Dani California"; Rihanna — "SOS"; Shakira (featuring Wyclef Jean) — "Hips Don't Lie" | **Justice vs. Simian — "We Are Your Friends"**: Gnarls Barkley — "Crazy"; Kanye West — "Touch the Sky"; OK Go — "A Million Ways"; Pink — "Stupid Girls" |
| Best Album | |
| **Red Hot Chili Peppers — Stadium Arcadium**: Christina Aguilera — Back to Basics; Nelly Furtado — Loose; Madonna — Confessions on a Dance Floor; Muse — Black Holes & Revelations | |
| Best Female | Best Male |
| **Christina Aguilera**: Beyoncé; Madonna; Nelly Furtado; Shakira | **Justin Timberlake**: Kanye West; Pharrell; Robbie Williams; Sean Paul |
| Best Group | Future Sounds |
| **Depeche Mode**: Keane; Red Hot Chili Peppers; The Black Eyed Peas; The Pussycat Dolls | **Gnarls Barkley** |
| Best Pop | Best Rock |
| **Justin Timberlake**: Christina Aguilera; Madonna; Robbie Williams; Shakira | **The Killers**: Evanescence; Keane; Red Hot Chili Peppers; The Strokes |
| Best Alternative | Best R&B |
| **Muse**: Arctic Monkeys; System of a Down; Korn; The Raconteurs | **Rihanna**: Beyoncé; Mary J. Blige; Outkast; Pharrell |
| Best Hip-Hop | |
| **Kanye West**: Busta Rhymes; Missy Elliott; P. Diddy; Sean Paul | |

== Regional nominations ==
Winners are in bold text.

| Best Adria Act | Best Baltic Act |
|---|---|
| **Aleksandra Kovač**: Edo Maajka; Let 3; Neisha; Siddharta | **Brainstorm**: Inculto; Skamp; Tanel Padar; Vanilla Ninja |
| Best Danish Act | Best Dutch & Belgian Act |
| **Outlandish**: Kashmir; L.O.C.; Nik & Jay; Spleen United | **Anouk**: Deus; Gabriel Ríos; Kane; Pete Philly & Perquisite |
| Best Finnish Act | Best French Act |
| **Poets of the Fall**: Lordi; Olavi Uusivirta; PMMP; Von Hertzen Brothers | **Diam's**: 113; Bob Sinclar; Olivia Ruiz; Rohff |
| Best German Act | Best Italian Act |
| **Bushido**: Die Toten Hosen; Rammstein; Silbermond; Sportfreunde Stiller | **Finley**: Jovanotti; Lacuna Coil; Mondo Marcio; Tiziano Ferro |
| Best Norwegian Act | Best Polish Act |
| **Marit Larsen**: Amulet; Elvira Nikolaisen; Mira Craig; Serena Maneesh | **Blog 27**: Coma; Hey; Sistars; Virgin |
| Best Portuguese Act | Best Romanian Act |
| **Moonspell**: Boss AC; David Fonseca; Expensive Soul; Mind Da Gap | **DJ Project**: Andreea Bănică as Blondy; Morandi; Parazitii; Simplu |
| Best Russian Act | Best Spanish Act |
| **Dima Bilan**: Gorod 312; t.A.T.u.; Uma2rman; Valeriy Meladze | **La Excepcion**: La Oreja de Van Gogh; Macaco; Nena Daconte; Pereza |
| Best Swedish Act | Best UK & Ireland Act |
| **Snook**: Lisa Miskovsky; Peter, Bjorn & John; The Knife; The Sounds | **The Kooks**: Arctic Monkeys; Corrine Bailey Rae; Lily Allen; Muse |
| Best African Act | |
| **Freshlyground**: Anselmo Ralph; Nameless; Juma Nature; P-Square | |

== Performances ==
- Justin Timberlake — "SexyBack / My Love / LoveStoned"
- Nelly Furtado — "Maneater"
- Muse — "Starlight"
- The Killers — "When You Were Young"
- Keane — "Is It Any Wonder?"
- P. Diddy and Cassie — "Come to Me"
- Rihanna — "SOS"
- Snoop Dogg (featuring Pharrell Williams) — "Drop It Like It's Hot"
- Outlandish — "I'm Callin' You"
- Jet — "Rip It Up"
- Lordi — "Hard Rock Hallelujah"

== Appearances ==
- Lars Ulrich — presented Future Sound
- Moby — presented Best Alternative
- Adrien Brody — presented Best Group
- Jeff Tremaine and Johnny Knoxville — presented Best Album
- Fat Joe — presented Best Hip-Hop
- Lordi — presented Best Rock
- Cassie and Tiziano Ferro — presented Best Pop
- Outlandish — presented Best R&B
- Daniel Craig and Mads Mikkelsen — presented Best Female
- Sugababes — presented Best Male
- Timbaland — presented Best Video
- Pharrell Williams — presented Best Song

== See also ==
- 2006 MTV Video Music Awards
