= 2004 MTV Europe Music Awards =

Music awards show held in Rome, Italy

- Date: 18 November 2004
- Location: Tor di Valle, Rome, Italy
- Hosted by: Xzibit
- Most wins: Outkast (3)
- Most nominations: Outkast (5)

Television/radio coverage
- Network: MTV Networks International (Europe)

The 2004 MTV Europe Music Awards were held at Tor di Valle Racecourse, Rome, Italy. As in 2003, the awards ceremony was held in a 6,000-capacity big top arena constructed specifically for the main event, called Valhalla Tensile 1, designed by Master Tentmaker Rudi Enos.

Award presenters on the night included Jamelia, Alicia Keys, N.E.R.D, Naomi Campbell, Andre 3000, Kid Rock and Kanye West.

== Nominations ==
Winners are in bold text.

Best Song	Best Video
**Outkast — "Hey Ya!"**: Anastacia — "Left Outside Alone"; Britney Spears — "Toxic"; Maroon 5 — "This Love"; Usher (featuring Lil' Jon and Ludacris) — "Yeah!"	**Outkast — "Hey Ya!"**: Jay-Z — "99 Problems"; The Cure — "The End of The World"; The Streets — "Fit But You Know It"; The White Stripes — "The Hardest Button to Button"
Best Album	Best Group
**Usher — Confessions**: Beyoncé — Dangerously in Love; Dido — Life For Rent; Outkast — Speakerboxxx/The Love Below; The Black Eyed Peas — Elephunk	**Outkast**: Beastie Boys; D12; Maroon 5; The Black Eyed Peas
Best Female	Best Male
**Britney Spears**: Alicia Keys; Anastacia; Avril Lavigne; Beyoncé	**Usher**: Jay-Z; Justin Timberlake; Nelly; Robbie Williams
Best Group	Best New Act
**Outkast**: Beastie Boys; D12; Maroon 5; The Black Eyed Peas	**Maroon 5**: Franz Ferdinand; Jamelia; Keane; The Rasmus
Best Rock	Best Alternative
**Linkin Park**: Good Charlotte; Green Day; Red Hot Chili Peppers; The Darkness	**Muse**: Björk; Franz Ferdinand; The Hives; The Prodigy
Best R&B	Best Hip-Hop
**Alicia Keys**: Beyoncé; Kelis; Outkast; Usher	**D12**: Beastie Boys; Jay-Z; Kanye West; Nelly
Best Pop	Free Your Mind
**The Black Eyed Peas**: Anastacia; Avril Lavigne; Britney Spears; Robbie Williams	**La Strada**

== Regional nominations ==
Winners are in bold text.

Best Dutch & Belgian Act	Best French Act
**Kane**: Novastar; Soulwax; The Sheer; Tiësto	**Jenifer**: Calogero; Corneille; IAM; Luke
Best German Act	Best Italian Act
**Beatsteaks**: Die Ärzte; Die Toten Hosen; Rammstein; Sportfreunde Stiller	**Tiziano Ferro**: Articolo 31; Caparezza; Elisa; Linea 77
Best Nordic Act	Best Polish Act
**The Hives**: Maria Mena; Sahara Hotnights; Saybia; Sondre Lerche	**Sistars**: Ania Dabrowska; Reni Jusis; Sidney Polak; Trzeci Wymiar
Best Portuguese Act	Best Romanian Act
**Da Weasel**: Clã; Gomo; Mesa; Toranja	**Ombladon (featuring Raku)**: Activ; Cargo; Firma; O-Zone
Best Russian Act	Best Spanish Act
**Zveri**: Dolphin; Glukoza; Leningrad; Via Gra	**Enrique Bunbury**: Alex Ubago; Bebe; David Bisbal; Estopa
Best UK & Ireland Act
**Muse**: Franz Ferdinand; Jamelia; Natasha Bedingfield; The Streets

== Performances ==
=== Pre show ===
- Carmen Consoli
- Hoobastank — "The Reason"
- The Cure
- Elisa

=== Main show ===
- Eminem — "Like Toy Soldiers / Just Lose It"
- Franz Ferdinand — "Take Me Out"
- Usher and Alicia Keys — "My Boo"
- Gwen Stefani — "What You Waiting For?"
- The Hives — "Two-Timing Touch and Broken Bones"
- Anastacia — "Left Outside Alone"
- Beastie Boys — "An Open Letter to NYC"
- Nelly (featuring Pharrell) — "Flap Your Wings / Play It Off"
- Maroon 5 — "This Love"
- Tiziano Ferro — "Sere Nere"

== Appearances ==
- Kylie Minogue — presented Best Album
- Paolo Di Canio and Alessandro Del Piero — presented Best Rock
- Kid Rock — introduced Franz Ferdinand
- Ozzy Osbourne and Sharon Osbourne — presented Best Group
- Brian Molko and Amy Lee — presented Best Alternative
- Elisha Cuthbert and Tony Hawk — presented Best Video
- Eamon — presented Best Hip-Hop
- Robert Smith — introduced Gwen Stefani
- André 3000 — introduced The Hives
- Jamelia and N.E.R.D — presented Best R&B
- Sarah Michelle Gellar — introduced Anastacia
- Duran Duran — presented Best New Act
- Brian McFadden, Nick Carter and AJ McLean — presented Best Pop
- Alicia Keys — presented Free Your Mind Award
- Black Eyed Peas — introduced Nelly featuring Pharrell
- Natasha Bedingfield, Chester Bennington and Joe Hahn — presented Best Female
- Naomi Campbell — presented Best Male
- Sarah Michelle Gellar — presented Best Song

== See also ==
- 2004 MTV Video Music Awards
