= 2001 MTV Europe Music Awards =

Music awards show held in Frankfurt, Germany

- Date: 8 November 2001
- Location: The Festhalle, Frankfurt, Germany
- Hosted by: Sacha Baron Cohen as Ali G
- Most wins: Limp Bizkit (3)
- Most nominations: Gorillaz (6)

Television/radio coverage
- Network: MTV Networks International (Europe)

The 2001 MTV Europe Music Awards were held in The Festhalle, Frankfurt. The ceremony attracted the largest television audience for the awards until 2007 and was one of the first entertainment broadcasts following the September 11 attacks in New York City.

Performances included Blink-182 with "First Date", Depeche Mode with "Never Let Me Down Again", Rammstein with "Ich Will" and Kylie Minogue with "Can't Get You Out of My Head". Jay-Z performed his track "Girls, Girls, Girls" and Craig David took to the stage with a version of "Walking Away" that sampled U2's "One".

The presenter line up included actress Christina Ricci, girl group Atomic Kitten, Nelly Furtado, Sugababes and Claudia Schiffer.

== Nominations ==
Winners are in bold text.

Best Song	Best Video
**Gorillaz (featuring Del tha Funkee Homosapien) — "Clint Eastwood"**: Christina Aguilera, Lil' Kim, Mýa and Pink — "Lady Marmalade"; Crazy Town — "Butterfly"; Destiny's Child — "Survivor"; Eminem (featuring Dido) — "Stan"	**The Avalanches — "Since I Left You"**: Fatboy Slim (featuring Bootsy Collins) — "Weapon of Choice"; Gorillaz (featuring Del tha Funkee Homosapien) — "Clint Eastwood"; Outkast — "Ms. Jackson"; Robbie Williams — "Supreme"
Best Album	
**Limp Bizkit — Chocolate Starfish and the Hot Dog Flavored Water**: Dido — No Angel; Madonna — Music; Travis — The Invisible Band; U2 — All That You Can't Leave Behind	
Best Female	Best Male
**Jennifer Lopez**: Dido; Janet Jackson; Madonna; Mariah Carey	**Robbie Williams**: Craig David; Eminem; Ricky Martin; Shaggy
Best Group	Best New Act
**Limp Bizkit**: Destiny's Child; Gorillaz; R.E.M.; U2	**Dido**: Craig David; Gorillaz; Nelly Furtado; Wheatus
Best Pop	Best Dance
**Anastacia**: Atomic Kitten; Britney Spears; *NSYNC; Shaggy	**Gorillaz**: Basement Jaxx; Daft Punk; Faithless; Roger Sanchez
Best Rock	Best R&B
**Blink-182**: Crazy Town; Limp Bizkit; Linkin Park; U2	**Craig David**: Destiny's Child; Janet Jackson; Outkast; Wyclef Jean
Best Hip-Hop	Web Award
**Eminem**: D12; Missy Elliott; Outkast; P. Diddy	**Limp Bizkit (www.limpbizkit.com)**: Daft Punk (www.daftpunk.com); Depeche Mode (www.depechemode.com); Gorillaz (www.gorillaz.com); U2 (www.u2.com)
Free Your Mind
**Treatment Action Campaign**

== Regional nominations ==
Winners are in bold text.

Best Dutch Act	Best French Act
**Kane**: Anouk; Bastian; Brainpower; Johan	**Manu Chao**: Daft Punk; Demon; St. Germain; The Supermen Lovers
Best German Act	Best Italian Act
**Samy Deluxe**: Die Ärzte; Echt; No Angels; Rammstein	**Elisa**: Marlene Kuntz; Neffa; Valeria Rossi; Tiromancino
Best Nordic Act	Best Polish Act
**Safri Duo**: Briskeby; Emmi; Eskobar; Titiyo	**Kasia Kowalska**: Fiolka; Reni Jusis; Myslovitz; Smolik
Best Russian Act	Best Spanish Act
**Alsou**: Bi-2; Mumiy Troll; t.A.T.u.; Zemfira	**La Oreja de Van Gogh**: Jarabe de Palo; Los Piratas; Najwa; Alejandro Sanz
Best UK & Ireland Act	
**Craig David**: Artful Dodger; Feeder; Gorillaz; S Club 7	

== Performances ==
- Kylie Minogue — "Can't Get You Out of My Head"
- Dido — "Hunter"
- Basement Jaxx — "Where's Your Head At"
- Blink-182 — "First Date"
- Craig David — "Walking Away"
- Mary J. Blige — "Family Affair"
- Jay-Z — "Izzo (H.O.V.A.) / Girls, Girls, Girls"
- Depeche Mode — "Never Let Me Down Again"
- Fred Durst, Wes Scantlin and Jimmy Page — "Thank You"
- Rammstein — "Ich Will"
- R.E.M. — "Imitation Of Life"
- Travis — "Side"

== Appearances ==
- Ben Stiller and Claudia Schiffer — presented Best Group
- Heidi Klum and Boris Becker — presented Best R&B
- Sophie Ellis-Bextor and Bomfunk MC's — presented Best Dance
- Emma Bunton and Eddy Grant — presented Best Male
- Kelis and Gavin Rossdale — presented Best Female
- Pink and Pedro Almodóvar — presented Best Video
- Sugababes and Roger Sanchez — presented The Web Award
- Alicia Keys and Brendan B. Brown — presented Best Song
- Xavier Naidoo and Nelly Furtado — presented Best Hip-Hop
- Nina Persson and Herbert Gronemeyer — presented Best Pop
- Joshua Jackson — presented Free Your Mind Award
- Shaggy and Andrea Corr — presented Best New Act
- Atomic Kitten and Ronan Keating — presented Best Rock
- Christina Ricci — presented Best Album

== See also ==
- 2001 MTV Video Music Awards
