= 2005 MTV Europe Music Awards =

Music awards show held in Lisbon, Portugal

- Date: 3 November 2005
- Location: Pavilhão Atlântico, Lisbon, Portugal
- Hosted by: (Borat Sagdiyev); Sacha Baron Cohen

Highlights
- Most wins: Coldplay, Green Day (2)
- Most nominations: Coldplay, Gorillaz (5)
- Website: http://tv.mtvema.com/

Television/radio coverage
- Network: MTV Networks International (Europe)

The 2005 MTV Europe Music Awards were held at Pavilhão Atlântico, Lisbon, Portugal.

The show was opened by Madonna, performing "Hung Up". Other performers included Pussycat Dolls, The Black Eyed Peas, Robbie Williams, Gorrilaz, and Foo Fighters.

Presenters included Anastacia, Jared Leto, John Legend, Sugababes and Brittany Murphy.

== Nominations ==
Winners are in bold text.

Best Song	Best Video
**Coldplay — "Speed of Sound"**: Gorillaz (featuring De La Soul) — "Feel Good Inc."; James Blunt — "You're Beautiful"; Snoop Dogg (featuring Justin Timberlake and Charlie Wilson) — "Signs"; The Chemical Brothers — "Galvanize"	**The Chemical Brothers — "Believe"**: Beck — "E-Pro"; Gorillaz (featuring De La Soul) — "Feel Good Inc."; Gwen Stefani — "What You Waiting For?"; Rammstein — "Keine Lust"
Best Album	
**Green Day — American Idiot**: 50 Cent — The Massacre; Coldplay — X&Y; Gwen Stefani — Love.Angel.Music.Baby.; U2 — How to Dismantle an Atomic Bomb	
Best Female	Best Male
**Shakira**: Alicia Keys; Gwen Stefani; Mariah Carey; Missy Elliott	**Robbie Williams**: 50 Cent; Eminem; Moby; Snoop Dogg
Best Group	Best New Act
**Gorillaz**: Coldplay; Green Day; The Black Eyed Peas; U2	**James Blunt**: Akon; Daniel Powter; Kaiser Chiefs; Rihanna
Best Pop	Best Rock
**The Black Eyed Peas**: Gorillaz; Gwen Stefani; Shakira; Robbie Williams	**Green Day**: Coldplay; Foo Fighters; Franz Ferdinand; U2
Best Alternative	Best R&B
**System of a Down**: Beck; Bloc Party; Goldfrapp; The White Stripes	**Alicia Keys**: John Legend; Mariah Carey; Mario; Usher
Best Hip-Hop	
**Snoop Dogg**: 50 Cent; Akon; Missy Elliott; Kanye West	
Free Your Mind
**Bob Geldof**

== Regional nominations ==
Winners are in bold text.

Best Adria Act	Best Danish Act
**Siddharta**: Leeloojamais; Leut Magnetik; Massimo; Urban&4	**Mew**: Carpark North; Nephew; Nik & Jay; The Raveonettes
Best Dutch & Belgian Act	Best Finnish Act
**Anouk**: Gabriel Ríos; Kane; Soulwax; Within Temptation	**The Rasmus**: Apocalyptica; HIM; Nightwish; The 69 Eyes
Best French Act	Best German Act
**Superbus**: Amel Bent; Kyo; Raphael; Sinik	**Rammstein**: Beatsteaks; Fettes Brot; Silbermond; Wir sind Helden
Best Italian Act	Best Norwegian Act
**Negramaro**: Francesco Renga; Giorgia; Laura Pausini; Negrita	**Turbonegro**: Ane Brun; Marion Raven; Röyksopp; Thomas Dybdahl
Best Polish Act	Best Portuguese Act
**Sistars**: Abradab; Monica Brodka; Sidney Polak; Zakopower	**The Gift**: Blasted Mechanism; Boss AC; Da Weasel; Humanos
Best Romanian Act	Best Russian Act
**Voltaj**: Akcent; DJ Project; Morandi; Parazitii	**Dima Bilan**: Nu Virgos; Uma2rman; Vyacheslav Butusov; Zemfira
Best Spanish Act	Best Swedish Act
**El Canto del Loco**: Amaral; El Sueño de Morfeo; Melendi; Pereza	**Moneybrother**: Christian Walz; Kent; The Hellacopters; Timbuktu
Best UK & Ireland Act	Best African Act
**Coldplay**: Gorillaz; James Blunt; Kaiser Chiefs; Stereophonics	**2 face Idibia**: Kaysha; Kleptomaniax; O2; Zamajobe

== Performances ==
=== Pre show ===
- John Legend - "Ordinary People / Number One" & "So High"

=== Main show ===
- Madonna — "Hung Up"
- Coldplay — "Talk"
- The Pussycat Dolls — "Don't Cha"
- Gorillaz — "Feel Good Inc."
- Akon — "Belly Dancer (Bananza)"
- Green Day — "Holiday"
- Robbie Williams — "Tripping"
- The Black Eyed Peas — "My Humps"
- Foo Fighters — "D.O.A."
- Shakira — "Don't Bother"
- System of a Down — "B.Y.O.B."

== Appearances ==
- Anastacia — presented Best Album
- Sugababes — presented Best Pop
- Sean Paul — presented Best Hip-Hop
- Luís Figo and Nuno Gomes — presented Best Rock
- Jared Leto — presented Best Alternative
- Craig David — presented Best R&B
- Nelly Furtado and Shaggy — presented Best Video
- John Legend — presented Best Female
- Madonna — presented Free Your Mind
- t.A.T.u. — presented Best Male
- Gael García Bernal and Diego Luna — presented Best New Act
- Borat and Brittany Murphy — introduced Alison Goldfrapp
- Alison Goldfrapp — presented Best Song
- Borat and Brittany Murphy — introduced Shakira
- Brittany Murphy — presented Best Group

== See also ==
- 2005 MTV Video Music Awards
