= 2003 MTV Europe Music Awards =

Music awards show held in Edinburgh, Scotland

- Date: 6 November 2003
- Location: Western Harbour, Edinburgh, Scotland
- Hosted by: Christina Aguilera
- Most wins: Justin Timberlake (3)
- Most nominations: Justin Timberlake (5)

Television/radio coverage
- Network: MTV Networks International (Europe)

The 2003 MTV Europe Music Awards were held in Western Harbour in Edinburgh, Scotland. The awards ceremony was held in a 6,000-capacity big top arena constructed specifically for the main event.

On the night, Justin Timberlake notably received a total of three awards, for Best Male, Best Pop and Best Album.

Presenters included André 3000, Justin Timberlake, The Black Eyed Peas and Ludacris.

== Nominations ==
Winners are in bold text.

Best Song	Best Video
**Beyoncé (featuring Jay-Z) — "Crazy in Love"**: Christina Aguilera — "Beautiful"; Evanescence (featuring Paul McCoy) — "Bring Me to Life"; Justin Timberlake — "Cry Me a River"; Sean Paul — "Get Busy"	**Sigur Rós — "Untitled 1"**: Missy Elliott — "Work It"; Queens of the Stone Age — "Go with the Flow"; The White Stripes — "Seven Nation Army"; U.N.K.L.E. — "Eye for an Eye"
Best Album	Best New Act
**Justin Timberlake — Justified**: 50 Cent — Get Rich or Die Tryin'; Christina Aguilera — Stripped; Robbie Williams — Escapology; The White Stripes — Elephant	**Sean Paul**: 50 Cent; Evanescence; Good Charlotte; Justin Timberlake
Best Female	Best Male
**Christina Aguilera**: Beyoncé; Kylie Minogue; Madonna; Pink	**Justin Timberlake**: Craig David; Eminem; Sean Paul; Robbie Williams
Best Group	Best R&B
**Coldplay**: Evanescence; Metallica; Radiohead; The White Stripes	**Beyoncé**: Ashanti; Craig David; Jennifer Lopez; Mary J. Blige
Best Pop	Best Dance
**Justin Timberlake**: Christina Aguilera; Kylie Minogue; Pink; Robbie Williams	**Panjabi MC**: Junior Senior; Moby; Paul Oakenfold; The Chemical Brothers
Best Rock	Best Hip-Hop
**The White Stripes**: Good Charlotte; Linkin Park; Metallica; Red Hot Chili Peppers	**Eminem**: 50 Cent; Jay-Z; Missy Elliott; Nelly
Web Award	Free Your Mind
**Goldfrapp (www.goldfrapp.co.uk)**: Junior Senior (www.juniorsenior.com); Madonna (http://www.madonna.com); Marilyn Manson (www.marilynmanson.com); Queens of the Stone Age (www.qotsa.com)	**Aung San Suu Kyi**

== Regional nominations ==
Winners are in bold text.

Best Dutch Act	Best French Act
**Tiësto**: Beef; BLØF; Junkie XL; Kane	**Kyo**: Berenice; Bob Sinclar; Jenifer; One-T
Best German Act	Best Italian Act
**Die Ärzte**: Guano Apes; Seeed; Wir sind Helden; Xavier Naidoo	**Gemelli Diversi**: Carmen Consoli; Le Vibrazioni; Negrita; Tiromancino
Best Nordic Act	Best Polish Act
**The Rasmus**: Junior Senior; Kashmir; Outlandish; The Cardigans	**Myslovitz**: Blue Café; Cool Kids of Death; Peja; Smolik
Best Portuguese Act	Best Romanian Act
**Blind Zero**: Blasted Mechanism; David Fonseca; Fonzie; Primitive Reason	**AB4**: Andra vs. Tiger One; O-Zone; Paraziții; Voltaj
Best Russian Act	Best Spanish Act
**Glukoza**: Diskoteka Avariya; Leningrad; Splean; t.A.T.u.	**El Canto del Loco**: Alejandro Sanz; Jarabe de Palo; Las Niñas; La Oreja de Van Gogh
Best MTV2 UK Act
**The Darkness**: Funeral for a Friend; The Coral; The Libertines; The Thrills

== Performances ==
=== Pre show ===
- Jane's Addiction — "True Nature"

=== Main show ===
- Christina Aguilera — "Dirrty"
- Beyoncé (featuring Sean Paul) — "Baby Boy"
- Kylie Minogue — "Slow"
- Missy Elliott — "Work It / Pass That Dutch"
- The Black Eyed Peas (featuring Justin Timberlake) — "Where Is the Love?"
- Travis — "The Beautiful Occupation"
- The Chemical Brothers and The Flaming Lips — "Hey Boy Hey Girl (intro) / The Golden Path"
- Dido — "White Flag"
- Kraftwerk — "Aerodynamik"
- The Darkness — "I Believe in a Thing Called Love"
- The White Stripes — "Seven Nation Army"
- Pink — "Trouble"

== Appearances ==
- Pink — presented Best Album
- Justin Timberlake — introduced Kylie Minogue
- Shirley Manson and Sharleen Spiteri — presented Best Dance
- Michael Stipe — introduced Dido
- Andre 3000 — presented Best R&B
- Dave Navarro and Perry Farrell — presented Best Rock
- Kelly Osbourne — presented Best Pop
- Billy Boyd and Gerard Butler — presented Best Hip-Hop
- Kylie Minogue — introduced Kraftwerk
- Christina Aguilera — presented the Free Your Mind Award
- Sean Paul — presented Best Female
- Pharrell Williams and Chad Hugo — presented Best Male
- Minnie Driver — presented Best Video
- Chris Pontius and Preston Lacy — presented Best Group
- Chingy and Ludacris — presented Best New Act
- Vin Diesel — presented Best Song

== Live technical difficulties ==
During the live performance of Beyoncé and Sean Paul's "Baby Boy" (near to Paul's rap), the backing tracks of vocals ("Baby boy you are so damn fine") started to malfunction, failing to repeat and losing the instrumental part of the song. Through the technical difficulties, Paul sang for a bit; Beyoncé asked the crowd how they were doing, which received applause and cheers.

The malfunction of the backing track vocals was cut from the live airing on TV but still played through the venue. Both artist and the dancers exited the stage, which then resulted in confusion among the presenters. When Christina Aguilera walked onto the stage to continue the event, the musical track stopped playing again. After Pink presented the award for Best Album, the duo was asked if they would like to do a re-take. Both agreed and performed the song as rehearsed. The re-take would replace the original take on re-airings of the show. This caused the EMAs to be extended, which had never happened before.

== See also ==
- 2003 MTV Video Music Awards
