= 2000 MTV Europe Music Awards =

Music awards show held in Stockholm, Sweden

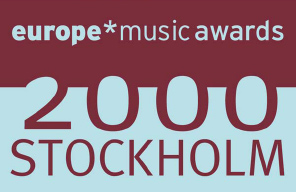
- Date: 16 November 2000
- Location: Globen, Stockholm, Sweden
- Hosted by: Wyclef Jean
- Most wins: Eminem, Madonna (2)
- Most nominations: Robbie Williams (5)

Television/radio coverage
- Network: MTV Networks International (Europe)
- Produced by: Sharon Ali, Tara Duffy and James O'Brien
- Directed by: Julia Knowles

The 2000 MTV Europe Music Awards were held on 16 November 2000 at the Ericsson Globe, Stockholm.

Performers included Jennifer Lopez, Ricky Martin, Robbie Williams and Kylie Minogue, and Madonna - one month after giving birth to son Rocco. The Spice Girls performance was their last before their separation. Presenters included Kelis, Guy Ritchie, Moby and Heidi Klum.

The nominees were announced on 2 October 2000. Robbie Williams was the most nominated with 5 awards (including 4 of the main categories), including Best Song and Best Video. Madonna and Eminem were the big winners of the night, with two awards each.

== Nominations ==
Winners are in bold text.

Best Song	Best Video
**Robbie Williams — "Rock DJ"**: Britney Spears — "Oops!... I Did It Again"; Madonna — "Music"; Melanie C (featuring Lisa "Left-Eye" Lopes) — "Never Be the Same Again"; Sonique — "It Feels So Good"	**Moby — "Natural Blues"**: Blink-182 — "All the Small Things"; Foo Fighters — "Learn to Fly"; Red Hot Chili Peppers — "Californication"; Robbie Williams — "Rock DJ"
Best Album	
**Eminem — The Marshall Mathers LP**: Bon Jovi — Crush; Macy Gray — On How Life Is; Moby — Play; Travis — The Man Who	
Best Female	Best Male
**Madonna**: Britney Spears; Janet Jackson; Jennifer Lopez; Melanie C	**Ricky Martin**: Eminem; Robbie Williams; Ronan Keating; Sisqó
Best Group	Best New Act
**Backstreet Boys**: Blink-182; Bon Jovi; Red Hot Chili Peppers; Travis	**Blink-182**: Anastacia; Bomfunk MC's; Melanie C; Sonique
Best Pop	Best Dance
**All Saints**: Backstreet Boys; Britney Spears; *NSYNC; Robbie Williams	**Madonna**: Artful Dodger; Moby; Moloko; Sonique
Best Rock	Best R&B
**Red Hot Chili Peppers**: Bon Jovi; Foo Fighters; Korn; Limp Bizkit	**Jennifer Lopez**: Aaliyah; Destiny's Child; Janet Jackson; Sisqó
Best Hip-Hop	
**Eminem**: Busta Rhymes; Cypress Hill; Dr. Dre; Wyclef Jean	
Free Your Mind
**Otpor!**

== Regional nominations ==
Winners are in bold text.

Best Dutch Act	Best French Act
**Kane**: Anouk; BLØF; Krezip	**Modjo**: Bob Sinclar; Laurent Garnier; Phoenix; Saian Supa Crew
Best German Act	Best Italian Act
**Guano Apes**: Die Ärzte; Die Toten Hosen; Echt; Fünf Sterne Deluxe	**Subsonica**: Carmen Consoli; Lùnapop; Paola e Chiara; Piero Pelu
Best Nordic Act	Best Polish Act
**Bomfunk MC's**: Darude; Shimoli; The Ark; Thomas Rusiak	**Kazik**: Brathanki; Kayah; Myslovitz; Reni Jusis
Best Spanish Act	Best UK & Ireland Act
**Dover**: Enrique Iglesias; M-Clan; Mónica Naranjo; OBK	**Westlife**: Craig David; Robbie Williams; Sonique; Travis

== Performances ==
- U2 — "Beautiful Day"
- All Saints — "Pure Shores"
- Madonna — "Music"
- Spice Girls — "Holler"
- Robbie Williams and Kylie Minogue — "Kids"
- Moby — "Porcelain"
- Jennifer Lopez — "Love Don't Cost a Thing"
- Ronan Keating — "Life Is a Rollercoaster"
- Guano Apes — "No Speech"
- Backstreet Boys — "Shape of My Heart"
- Bomfunk MCs — "Freestyler"
- Ricky Martin — "She Bangs"

== Appearances ==
- Ali G and Róisín Murphy — presented Best Male
- Nick Carter, Kevin Richardson and Heidi Klum — presented Best R&B
- Bruce Dickinson and Virginie Ledoyen — presented Best Rock
- Anastacia and Ronan Keating — presented Best Group
- Eiffel 65 and Tia Carrere — presented Best New Act
- Aqua and Sonique — presented Best Pop
- Thora Birch — presented Best Dance
- Guy Ritchie — presented Best Video
- Jean Reno — presented Free Your Mind Award
- Savage Garden — presented Best Hip-Hop
- Kelis and Moby — presented Best Female
- Dolce & Gabbana and The Cardigans — presented Best Album
- Jason Priestley and Kylie Minogue — presented Best Song

== See also ==
- 2000 MTV Video Music Awards
