= MTV Europe Music Award for Best Artist =

Music award

- Country: Europe
- Presented by: MTV
- First award: 2007
- Currently held by: Taylor Swift (2024)

Highlights
- Most wins: Taylor Swift (3)
- Most nominations: Taylor Swift (5)
- Website: ema.mtv.tv/

The following is a list of the MTV Europe Music Award winners and nominees for Best Artist.

== Winners and nominees ==
=== 2000s ===
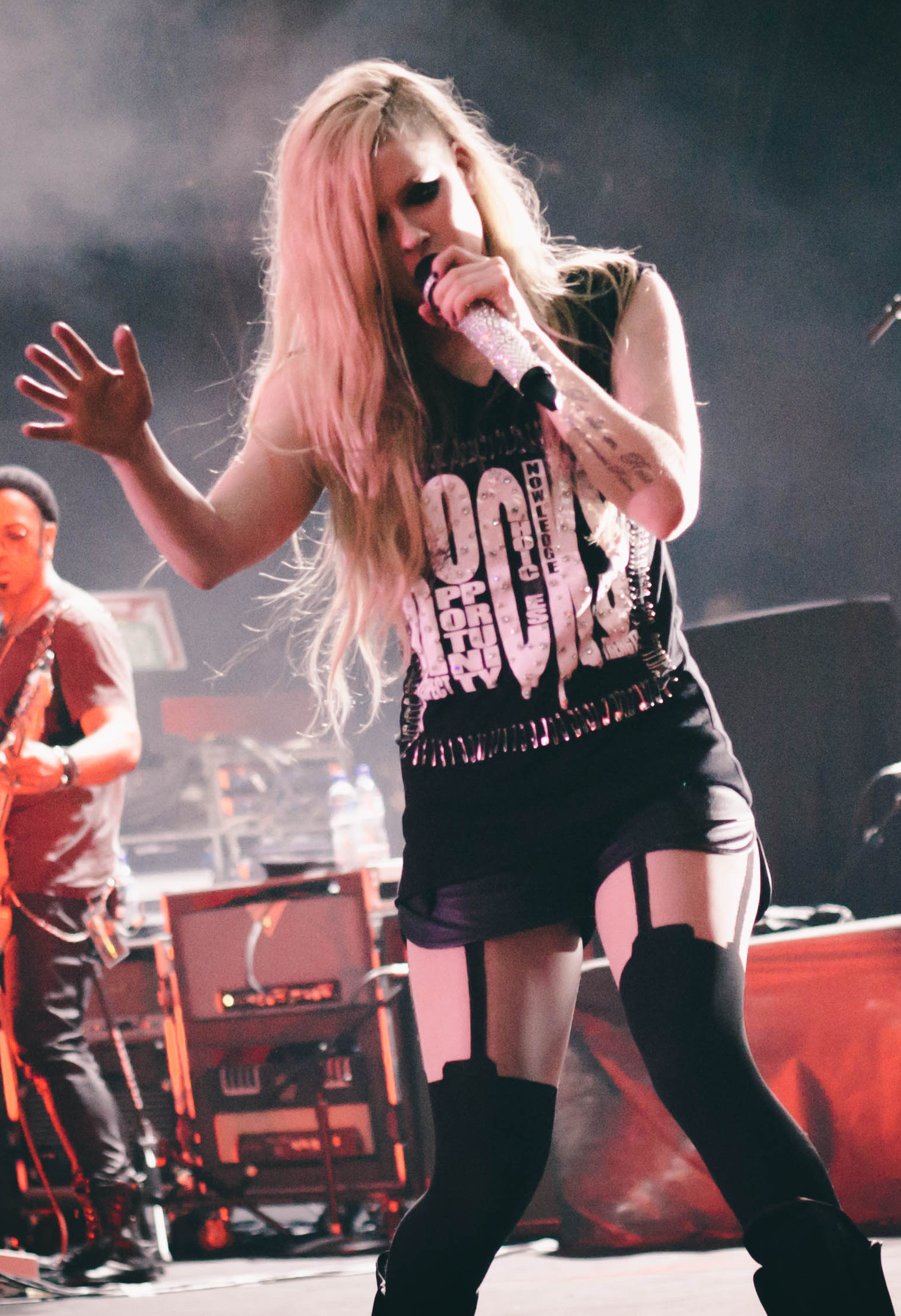
2007 award winner, Avril Lavigne

Year	Artist	Ref
2007
2007	Avril Lavigne	
2007	Christina Aguilera	
2007	Justin Timberlake	
2007	Mika	
2007	Nelly Furtado	
2007	Rihanna	

=== 2010s ===
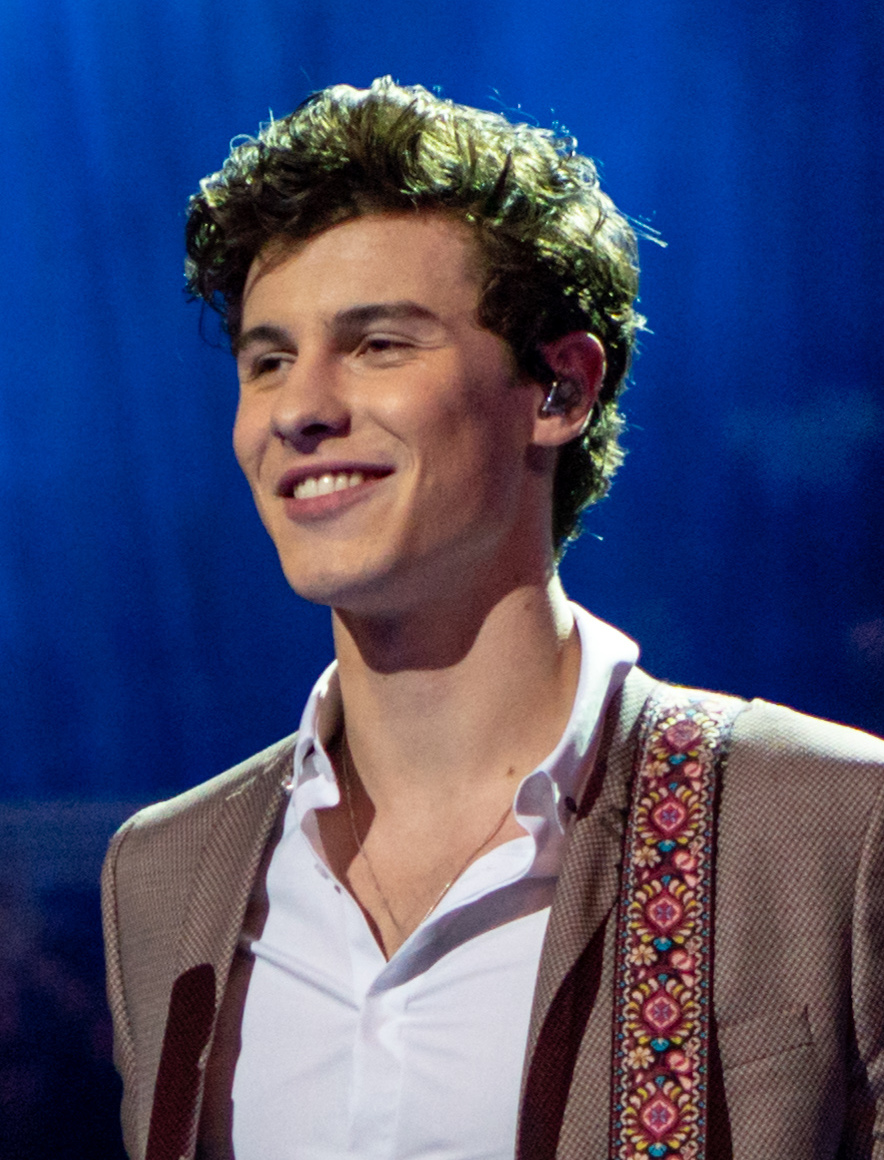
2017 & 2019 award winner, Shawn Mendes

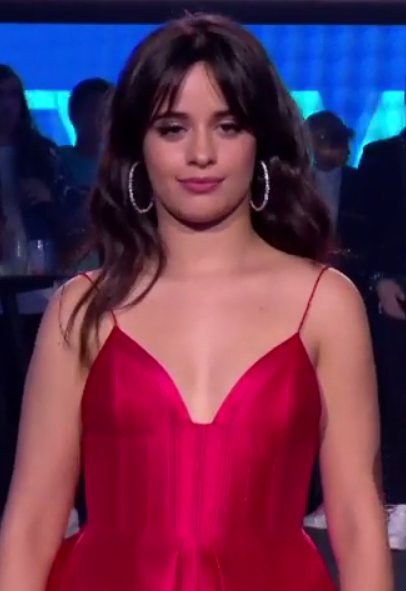
2018 award winner, Camila Cabello

Year	Artist	Ref
2017
2017	Shawn Mendes	
2017	Ariana Grande	
2017	Ed Sheeran	
2017	Kendrick Lamar	
2017	Miley Cyrus	
2017	Taylor Swift	
2018
2018	Camila Cabello	
2018	Ariana Grande	
2018	Drake	
2018	Dua Lipa	
2018	Post Malone	
2019
2019	Shawn Mendes	
2019	Ariana Grande	
2019	J Balvin	
2019	Miley Cyrus	
2019	Taylor Swift	

=== 2020s ===
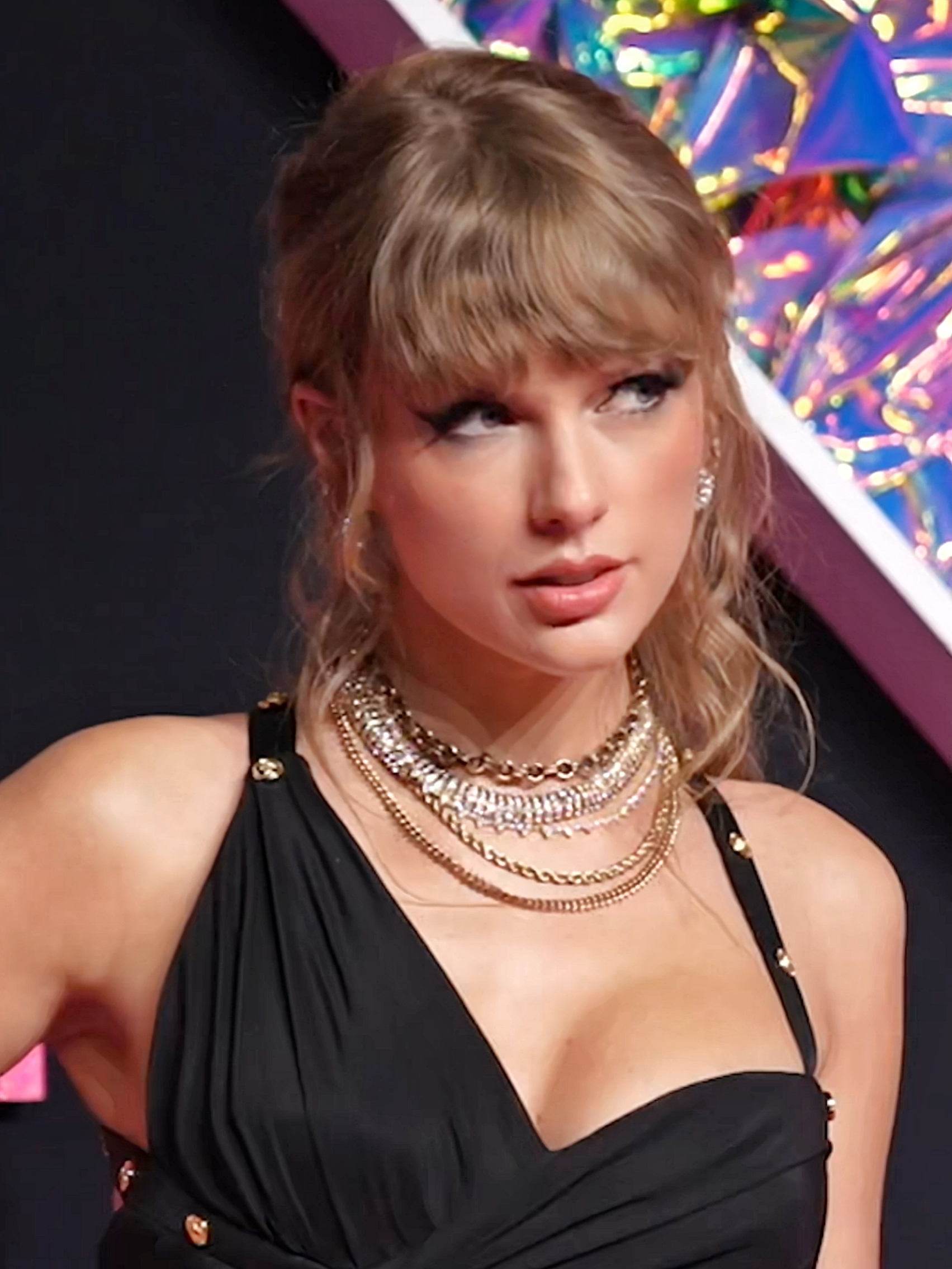
2022, 2023 & 2024 award winner, Taylor Swift

Year	Artist	Ref
2020
2020	Lady Gaga	
2020	Dua Lipa	
2020	Harry Styles	
2020	Justin Bieber	
2020	Miley Cyrus	
2020	The Weeknd	
2021
2021	Ed Sheeran	
2021	Doja Cat	
2021	Justin Bieber	
2021	Lady Gaga	
2021	Lil Nas X	
2021	The Weeknd	
2022
2022	Taylor Swift	
2022	Adele	
2022	Beyoncé	
2022	Harry Styles	
2022	Nicki Minaj	
2022	Rosalía	
2023
2023	Taylor Swift	
2023	Doja Cat	
2023	Miley Cyrus	
2023	Nicki Minaj	
2023	Olivia Rodrigo	
2023	SZA	
2024
2024	Taylor Swift	
2024	Beyoncé	
2024	Billie Eilish	
2024	Post Malone	
2024	Raye	
2024	Sabrina Carpenter	

== Statistics ==
The statistic holder of the 2018 award.

Artist
23	11	Female
23	8	Male

Nominee
4	Taylor Swift
3	Ariana Grande
3	Miley Cyrus
2	Justin Bieber
2	Nicki Minaj
2	Britney Spears
2	Christina Aguilera
2	Ed Sheeran
2	Lady Gaga
2	Rihanna
2	Shawn Mendes
2	Doja Cat
