= MTV Europe Music Award for Best Album =

Category of MTV Europe Music Awards

- Description: Best album released by a European or international artist
- Presented by: MTV Europe Music Awards
- Website: www.mtvema.com

The MTV Europe Music Award for Best Album was first awarded in 1998, before being retired in 2008. Nelly Furtado's 2006 album Loose was the only album that was nominated twice.

== Winners and nominees ==
Winners are listed first and highlighted in bold.

=== 1990s ===
Year	Artist	Album	Ref
1998
1998	**Madonna**	**Ray of Light**	
1998	All Saints	All Saints	
1998	Beastie Boys	Hello Nasty	
1998	Massive Attack	Mezzanine	
1998	Robbie Williams	Life Thru a Lens	
1999
1999	**Boyzone**	**By Request**	
1999	Backstreet Boys	Millennium	
1999	Lauryn Hill	The Miseducation of Lauryn Hill	
1999	The Offspring	Americana	
1999	Red Hot Chili Peppers	Californication	

=== 2000s ===
Year	Artist	Song	Ref
2000
2000	**Eminem**	**The Marshall Mathers LP**	
2000	Bon Jovi	Crush	
2000	Macy Gray	On How Life Is	
2000	Moby	Play	
2000	Travis	The Man Who	
2001
2001	**Limp Bizkit**	**Chocolate Starfish and the Hot Dog Flavored Water**	
2001	Dido	No Angel	
2001	Madonna	Music	
2001	Travis	The Invisible Band	
2001	U2	All That You Can't Leave Behind	
2002
2002	**Eminem**	**The Eminem Show**	
2002	Coldplay	A Rush of Blood to the Head	
2002	Kylie Minogue	Fever	
2002	No Doubt	Rock Steady	
2002	Pink	Missundaztood	
2003
2003	**Justin Timberlake**	**Justified**	
2003	50 Cent	Get Rich or Die Tryin'	
2003	Christina Aguilera	Stripped	
2003	The White Stripes	Elephant	
2003	Robbie Williams	Escapology	
2004
2004	**Usher**	**Confessions**	
2004	Beyoncé	Dangerously in Love	
2004	The Black Eyed Peas	Elephunk	
2004	Dido	Life for Rent	
2004	Outkast	Speakerboxxx/The Love Below	
2005
2005	**Green Day**	**American Idiot**	
2005	50 Cent	The Massacre	
2005	Coldplay	X&Y	
2005	Gwen Stefani	Love.Angel.Music.Baby	
2005	U2	How to Dismantle an Atomic Bomb	
2006
2006	**Red Hot Chili Peppers**	**Stadium Arcadium**	
2006	Christina Aguilera	Back to Basics	
2006	Nelly Furtado	Loose	
2006	Madonna	Confessions on a Dance Floor	
2006	Muse	Black Holes & Revelations	
2007
2007	**Nelly Furtado**	**Loose**	
2007	Akon	Konvicted	
2007	Avril Lavigne	The Best Damn Thing	
2007	Linkin Park	Minutes to Midnight	
2007	Amy Winehouse	Back to Black	
2008
2008	**Britney Spears**	**Blackout**	
2008	Coldplay	Viva la Vida or Death and All His Friends	
2008	Duffy	Rockferry	
2008	Alicia Keys	As I Am	
2008	Leona Lewis	Spirit	
