= MTV Europe Music Award for Best Alternative =

Category of MTV Europe Music Awards

- Country: Europe
- Presented by: MTV
- First award: 1997
- Currently held by: Imagine Dragons (2024)

Highlights
- Most wins: Thirty Seconds to Mars (4)
- Website: ema.mtv.tv/

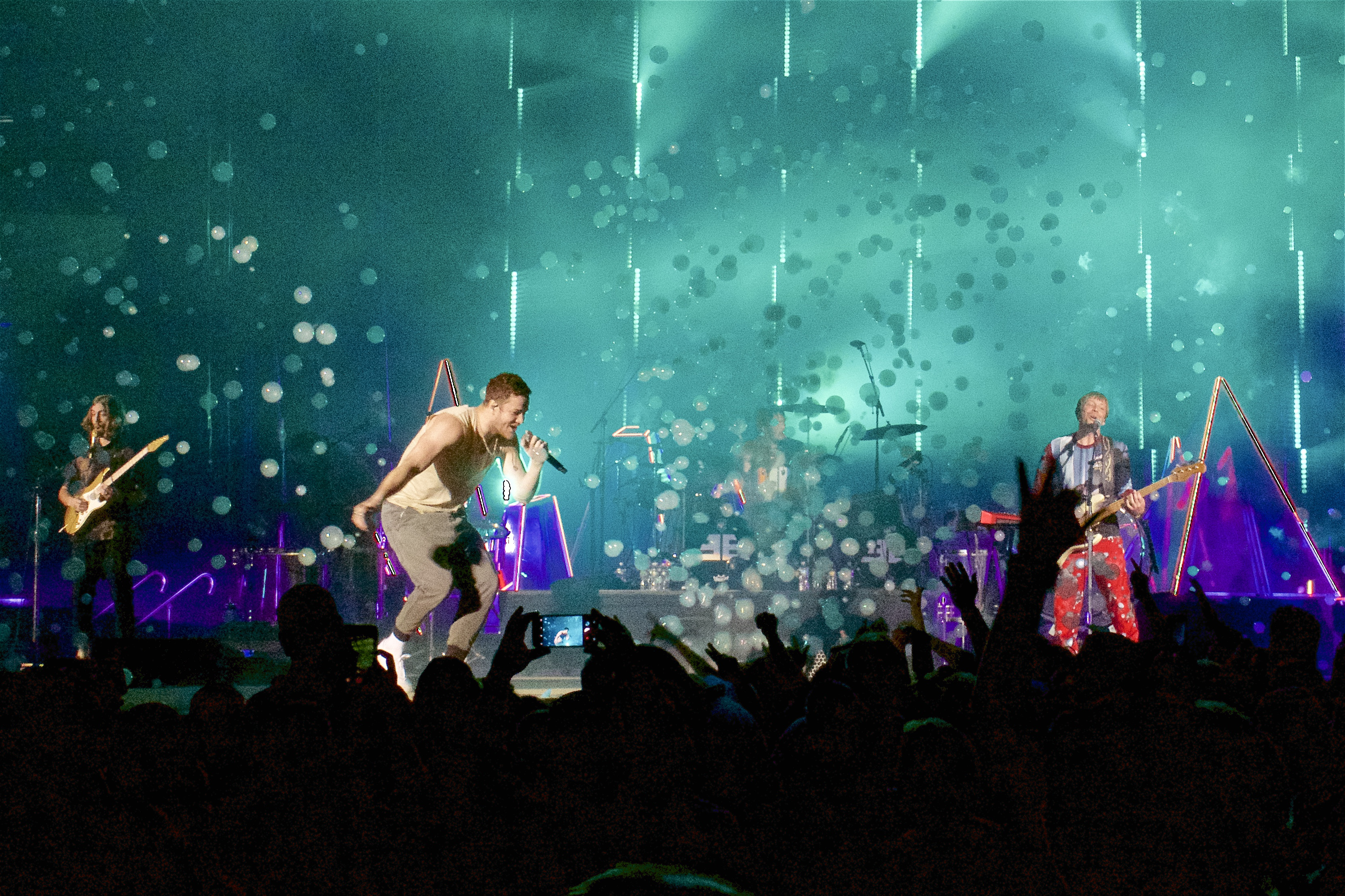
Imagine Dragons live in concert at Mohegan Sun in Uncasville, Connecticut, November 2017.

The MTV Europe Music Award for Best Alternative has been awarded since 1997.

== Winners and nominees ==
Winners are listed first and highlighted in bold.

† indicates an MTV Video Music Award for Best Alternative Video–winning artist.
‡ indicates an MTV Video Music Award for Best Alternative Video–nominated artist that same year.

Hayley Williams of Paramore and Lana Del Rey are the only female artists that have won more than once.

=== 1990s ===
Year	Artist	Ref
1997
1997	**The Prodigy**	
1997	Beck ‡	
1997	Blur ‡	
1997	Radiohead	
1997	The Verve	

=== 2000s ===
Year	Artist	Ref
2004
2004	**Muse**	
2004	Björk	
2004	Franz Ferdinand	
2004	The Hives	
2004	The Prodigy	
2005
2005	**System of a Down**	
2005	Beck	
2005	Bloc Party	
2005	Goldfrapp	
2005	The White Stripes	
2006
2006	**Muse**	
2006	Arctic Monkeys	
2006	Korn	
2006	The Raconteurs	
2006	System of a Down	
2009
2009	**Placebo**	
2009	Muse	
2009	Paramore	
2009	The Killers	
2009	The Prodigy	

=== 2010s ===
Year	Artist	Ref
2010
2010	**Paramore**	
2010	Arcade Fire	
2010	The Black Keys	
2010	Gorillaz	
2010	Vampire Weekend	
2011
2011	**Thirty Seconds to Mars**	
2011	Arcade Fire	
2011	Arctic Monkeys	
2011	My Chemical Romance	
2011	The Strokes	
2012
2012	**Lana Del Rey**	
2012	The Black Keys	
2012	Florence + The Machine	
2012	Foster The People	
2012	Jack White	
2013
2013	**Thirty Seconds to Mars**	
2013	Arctic Monkeys	
2013	Fall Out Boy	
2013	Franz Ferdinand	
2013	Paramore	
2014
2014	**Thirty Seconds to Mars**	
2014	Arcade Fire	
2014	Lana Del Rey	
2014	Lorde	
2014	Paramore	
2015
2015	**Lana Del Rey**	
2015	Björk	
2015	Fall Out Boy	
2015	Florence and the Machine	
2015	Twenty One Pilots	
2016
2016	**Twenty One Pilots**	
2016	Kings of Leon	
2016	Radiohead	
2016	Tame Impala	
2016	The 1975	
2017
2017	**Thirty Seconds to Mars**	
2017	Imagine Dragons	
2017	Lana Del Rey	
2017	Lorde	
2017	The xx	
2018
2018	**Panic! at the Disco**	
2018	Fall Out Boy	
2018	The 1975	
2018	Thirty Seconds to Mars	
2018	Twenty One Pilots	
2019
2019	**FKA Twigs**	
2019	Lana Del Rey	
2019	Solange	
2019	Twenty One Pilots	
2019	Vampire Weekend	

=== 2020s ===
Year	Artist	Ref
2020
2020	**Hayley Williams**	
2020	Blackbear	
2020	FKA Twigs	
2020	Machine Gun Kelly †	
2020	Twenty One Pilots ‡	
2020	The 1975 ‡	
2021
2021	**Yungblud**	
2021	Halsey	
2021	Lorde	
2021	Machine Gun Kelly †	
2021	Twenty One Pilots ‡	
2021	Willow ‡	
2022
2022	**Gorillaz**	
2022	Imagine Dragons ‡	
2022	Panic! At The Disco ‡	
2022	Tame Impala	
2022	Twenty One Pilots ‡	
2022	Yungblud	
2023
2023	**Lana Del Rey** †	
2023	Blur	
2023	Fall Out Boy ‡	
2023	Paramore ‡	
2023	Thirty Seconds to Mars ‡	
2023	Yungblud	
2024
2024	**Imagine Dragons ‡**	
2024	Hozier ‡	
2024	Fontaines D.C.	
2024	Lana Del Rey	
2024	Twenty One Pilots	
2024	Yungblud	

== See also ==
- MTV Video Music Award for Best Alternative Video
