= 1999 MTV Europe Music Awards =

Edition of music award

- Date: 11 November 1999
- Location: Point Depot, Dublin, Ireland
- Hosted by: Ronan Keating
- Most wins: Britney Spears (4)
- Most nominations: Backstreet Boys, Britney Spears (4)

Television/radio coverage
- Network: MTV Networks International (Europe)

The 1999 MTV Europe Music Awards were held in Dublin, Ireland at The Point. Ronan Keating returned as host, with musical numbers including Mariah Carey with "Heartbreaker", Whitney Houston with "Get It Back" and "My Love Is Your Love", Britney Spears with "...Baby One More Time" & "(You Drive Me) Crazy", and The Corrs with "Radio", as well as The Cardigans, Jamiroquai, Marilyn Manson, and show-opener Iggy Pop.

Presenters included models/actresses Denise Richards and Carmen Electra, singers Christina Aguilera and Mary J. Blige, Fun Lovin' Criminals, and 'Ginger Spice' Geri Halliwell, who had recently released her debut solo record after quitting the Spice Girls the year prior.

== Nominations ==
Winners are in bold text.

Best Song	Best Video
**Britney Spears — "...Baby One More Time"**: Backstreet Boys — "I Want It That Way"; George Michael and Mary J. Blige — "As"; Madonna — "Beautiful Stranger"; TLC — "No Scrubs"	**Blur — "Coffee & TV"**: Aphex Twin — "Windowlicker"; Björk — "All Is Full Of Love"; Fatboy Slim — "Praise You"; George Michael and Mary J. Blige — "As"
Best Album	Best Female
**Boyzone — By Request**: Backstreet Boys — Millennium; Lauryn Hill — The Miseducation of Lauryn Hill; Red Hot Chili Peppers — Californication; The Offspring — Americana	**Britney Spears**: Geri Halliwell; Lauryn Hill; Madonna; Whitney Houston
Best Male	Best Group
**Will Smith**: George Michael; Ricky Martin; Robbie Williams; Sasha	**Backstreet Boys**: Jamiroquai; The Cardigans; The Offspring; TLC
Breakthrough Artist	Best Pop
**Britney Spears**: Eminem; Jennifer Lopez; Vengaboys; Westlife	**Britney Spears**: Backstreet Boys; Boyzone; Five; Ricky Martin
Best Dance	Best Rock
**Fatboy Slim**: Basement Jaxx; Jamiroquai; Mr. Oizo; The Chemical Brothers	**The Offspring**: Lenny Kravitz; Marilyn Manson; Red Hot Chili Peppers; The Cardigans
Best R&B	Best Hip-Hop
**Whitney Houston**: Jennifer Lopez; Lauryn Hill; Mariah Carey; TLC	**Eminem**: Beastie Boys; Busta Rhymes; Puff Daddy; Will Smith
Free Your Mind
**Bono**

== Regional nominations ==
Winners are in bold text.

Best German Act	Best Italian Act
**Xavier Naidoo**: Absolute Beginner; Freundeskreis; Guano Apes; Sasha	**Elio e le Storie Tese**: Alex Britti; Jovanotti; Negrita; Vasco Rossi
Best Nordic Act	Best UK & Ireland Act
**Lene Marlin**: Andreas Johnson; Jennifer Brown; Petter; The Cardigans	**Boyzone**: Basement Jaxx; Lynden David Hall; Manic Street Preachers; Texas; Westlife

== Performances ==
=== Pre-show ===
- B*Witched — "Jesse Hold On"
- Westlife — "If I Let You Go"

=== Main show ===
- Iggy Pop — "Lust for Life"
- Mariah Carey — "Heartbreaker", with remix featuring Missy Elliott and Da Brat
- Underworld — "Push Upstairs"
- Britney Spears — "...Baby One More Time", " (You Drive Me) Crazy"
- The Offspring — "The Kids Aren't Alright"
- Jamiroquai — "King for a Day"
- Whitney Houston — "Get It Back / My Love Is Your Love"
- The Cardigans — "Erase/Rewind"
- Puff Daddy — "Best Friend"
- Ligabue — "L'odore del sesso"
- The Corrs — "Radio"
- Marilyn Manson — "Rock Is Dead"

== Appearances ==
- Denise Richards and Pierce Brosnan — presented Best Female
- Geri Halliwell — presented Best Dance
- Christina Aguilera and TQ — presented Best Hip-Hop
- Carmen Electra and Fun Lovin' Criminals — presented Best Rock
- Damon Albarn and Mary J. Blige — presented Best R&B
- Lars Oostveen and Sasha — presented Best Nordic Act
- Steps — presented Best Group
- Alicia Silverstone — presented Best Pop
- Anastasia Zampounidis and Missy Elliott - presented Best German Act
- Eternal and Jovanotti — presented Best Male
- The Jukka Brothers — presented Best Album
- Kris & Kris and Andrea Pezzi — presented Best Italian Act
- Brett Anderson and Des'ree — presented Breakthrough Artist
- Cat Deeley and Edith Bowman — presented Best UK & Ireland Act
- Mick Jagger — presented Free Your Mind Award
- Five — presented Best Song
- Armand Van Helden and The Edge — presented Best Video

== See also ==
- 1999 MTV Video Music Awards
