= MTV Europe Music Award for Best Live Act =

Category of MTV Europe Music Awards

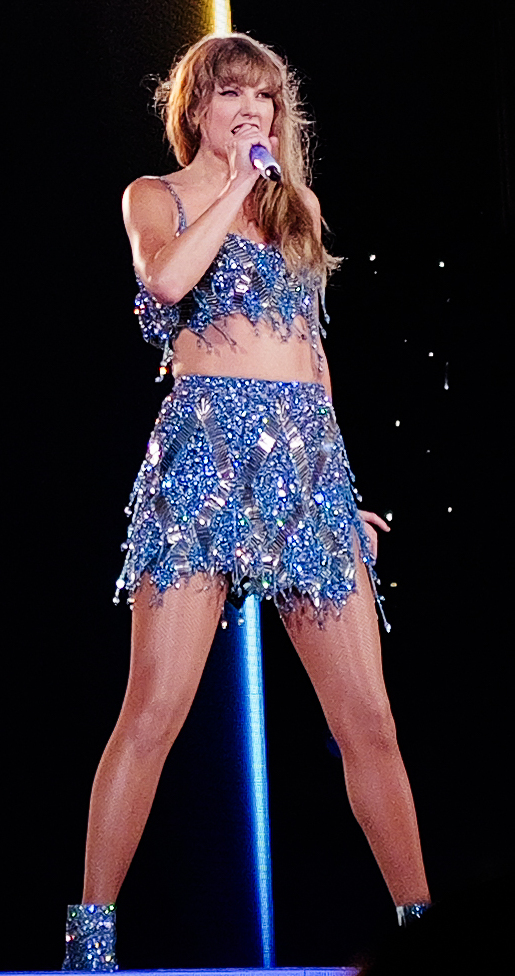
Taylor Swift is the most recent recipient and the most awarded artist in this category.

The MTV Europe Music Award for Best Live Act is an award category for the MTV Europe Music Awards. It was first awarded in 1995, which Take That won for their Nobody Else Tour lasting from March to October 1995. U2 and Ed Sheeran won the award the most times, both receiving two awards. The award was briefly named Best Headliner for the 2007 and 2008 ceremonies.

== Winners and nominees ==
Winners are listed first and highlighted in bold.

=== 1990s ===
Year	Artist	Tour	Ref
1995
1995	**Take That**	**Nobody Else Tour**	
1995	Bon Jovi	These Days Tour	
1995	The Prodigy	Music for the Jilted Generation Tour	
1995	R.E.M.	Parallel Tour	
1995	The Rolling Stones	Voodoo Lounge Tour	
1997
1997	**U2**	**PopMart Tour**	
1997	Aerosmith	Nine Lives Tour	
1997	Michael Jackson	HIStory World Tour	
1997	Radiohead	OK Computer era and Against Demons Tour	
1997	Skunk Anansie	Stoosh Tour	

=== 2000s ===
Year	Artist	Tour	Ref
2002
2002	**Red Hot Chili Peppers**	**By the Way World Tour**	
2002	Depeche Mode	Exciter Tour	
2002	Korn	Untouchables Tour	
2002	Lenny Kravitz	Lenny Tour	
2002	U2	Elevation Tour	
2007
2007	**Muse**	**Black Holes and Revelations Tour**	
2007	Arctic Monkeys	Favourite Worst Nightmare Tour	
2007	Beyoncé	The Beyoncé Experience	
2007	Foo Fighters	Echoes, Silence, Patience & Grace Tour	
2007	Justin Timberlake	FutureSex/LoveShow	
2008
2008	**Tokio Hotel**	**1000 Hotels Tour**	
2008	The Cure	4 Play Tour	
2008	Foo Fighters	Echoes, Silence, Patience & Grace Tour	
2008	Linkin Park	Projekt Revolution	
2008	Metallica	2008 European Vacation Tour/World Magnetic Tour	
2009
2009	**U2**	**U2 360° Tour**	
2009	Beyoncé	I Am... World Tour	
2009	Green Day	21st Century Breakdown World Tour	
2009	Kings of Leon	Only by the Night World Tour	
2009	Lady Gaga	The Fame Ball Tour	

=== 2010s ===
Year	Artist	Tour	Ref
2010
2010	**Linkin Park**	**A Thousand Suns World Tour**	
2010	Bon Jovi	The Circle Tour	
2010	Kings of Leon	Come Around Sundown World Tour	
2010	Lady Gaga	The Monster Ball Tour	
2010	Muse	The Resistance Tour	
2011
2011	**Katy Perry**	**California Dreams Tour**	
2011	Coldplay	Mylo Xyloto Tour	
2011	Foo Fighters	Echoes, Silence, Patience & Grace Tour	
2011	Lady Gaga	The Monster Ball Tour	
2011	Red Hot Chili Peppers	I'm with You World Tour	
2012
2012	**Taylor Swift**	**Speak Now World Tour**	
2012	Green Day	21st Century Breakdown World Tour	
2012	Jay Z and Kanye West	Watch the Throne Tour	
2012	Lady Gaga	Born This Way Ball	
2012	Muse	The Resistance Tour	
2013
2013	**Beyoncé**	**The Mrs. Carter Show World Tour**	
2013	Green Day	99 Revolutions Tour	
2013	Pink	The Truth About Love Tour	
2013	Taylor Swift	Red Tour	
2013	Justin Timberlake	Legends of the Summer Stadium Tour	
2014
2014	**One Direction**	**Where We Are Tour**	
2014	Beyoncé	On the Run Tour	
2014	Bruno Mars	The Moonshine Jungle Tour	
2014	Katy Perry	The Prismatic World Tour	
2014	Justin Timberlake	The 20/20 Experience World Tour	
2015
2015	**Ed Sheeran**	**x Tour**	
2015	Foo Fighters	Sonic Highways World Tour	
2015	Lady Gaga and Tony Bennett	Cheek to Cheek Tour	
2015	Katy Perry	The Prismatic World Tour	
2015	Taylor Swift	The 1989 World Tour	
2016
2016	**Twenty One Pilots**	**Emotional Roadshow World Tour**	
2016	Adele	Adele Live 2016	
2016	Beyoncé	The Formation World Tour	
2016	Coldplay	A Head Full of Dreams Tour	
2016	Green Day	Revolution Radio Tour	
2017
2017	**Ed Sheeran**	**÷ Tour**	
2017	Bruno Mars	24K Magic World Tour	
2017	Eminem	Revival Tour	
2017	Coldplay	A Head Full of Dreams Tour	
2017	U2	The Joshua Tree Tour 2017	
2018
2018	**Shawn Mendes**	**Illuminate World Tour**	
2018	Ed Sheeran	÷ Tour	
2018	Muse	North American Summer Amphitheatre Tour	
2018	P!nk	Beautiful Trauma World Tour	
2018	The Carters	On the Run II Tour	
2019
2019	**BTS**	**Love Yourself World Tour**	
2019	Ariana Grande	Sweetener World Tour	
2019	Ed Sheeran	÷ Tour	
2019	P!nk	Beautiful Trauma World Tour	
2019	Travis Scott	Astroworld: Wish You Were Here Tour	

=== 2020s ===
Year	Artist	Tour	Ref
2020
2020	**BTS**	**Map of the Soul Tour Live Stream**	
2020	J Balvin	Beyond the Colores Live Experience	
2020	Katy Perry	Tomorrowland: Around the World	
2020	Little Mix	UNCancelled	
2020	Maluma	Papi Juancho Live	
2020	Post Malone	Nirvana Tribute	
2022
2022	**Harry Styles**	**Love On Tour**	
2022	Coldplay	Music of the Spheres World Tour	
2022	Ed Sheeran	+–=÷x Tour	
2022	Kendrick Lamar	The Big Steppers Tour	
2022	Lady Gaga	The Chromatica Ball	
2022	The Weeknd	After Hours til Dawn Tour	
2023
2023	**Taylor Swift**	**The Eras Tour**	
2023	Beyoncé	Renaissance World Tour	
2023	Burna Boy	I Told Them... Tour	
2023	Ed Sheeran	Tour	
2023	Måneskin	Rush! World Tour	
2023	SZA	SOS Tour	
2023	The Weeknd	After Hours til Dawn Tour	

== See also ==
- MTV Video Music Award for Best Stage Performance
