= 1998 MTV Europe Music Awards =

MTV Europe Music Awards, 1998, Italy

- Date: 12 November 1998
- Location: Fila Forum, Assago (Province of Milan), Italy
- Hosted by: Jenny McCarthy
- Most wins: Madonna, Spice Girls (2)
- Most nominations: All Saints, Beastie Boys, Eagle-Eye Cherry (4)

Television/radio coverage
- Network: MTV Networks International (Europe)

The 1998 MTV Europe Music Awards took place in Milan, Italy. The ceremony was hosted by former Playboy model, actress and comedian Jenny McCarthy.

On this year 6 new categories were introduced including the MTV Selects; UK and Ireland, Northern, Central and Southern. The big winner of the night were the Spice Girls and Madonna with two awards. Melanie C, alias Sporty Spice, and Emma Bunton, known as Baby Spice, collected the trophy on behalf of the group. On receiving the award, Mel C shouted: "We've done it again". "And a big hello from the other two", she added, referring to Mel B and Victoria Adams, both of whom were pregnant and did not attend the ceremony.

== Nominations ==
Winners are in bold text.

Best Song	Best Video
**Natalie Imbruglia — "Torn"**: All Saints — "Never Ever"; Cornershop — "Brimful of Asha"; Robbie Williams — "Angels"; Savage Garden — "Truly Madly Deeply"	**Massive Attack — "Teardrop"**: Aphex Twin — "Come to Daddy"; Beastie Boys — "Intergalactic"; Eagle-Eye Cherry — "Save Tonight"; Garbage — "Push It"
Best Album	
**Madonna — Ray of Light**: All Saints — All Saints; Beastie Boys — Hello Nasty; Massive Attack — Mezzanine; Robbie Williams — Life thru a Lens	
Best Female	Best Male
**Madonna**: Celine Dion; Janet Jackson; Mariah Carey; Natalie Imbruglia	**Robbie Williams**: Eagle-Eye Cherry; Puff Daddy; Ricky Martin; Will Smith
Best Group	Breakthrough Artist
**Spice Girls**: All Saints; Backstreet Boys; Beastie Boys; Garbage	**All Saints**: Aqua; Eagle-Eye Cherry; Five; Natalie Imbruglia
Best Pop	Best Dance
**Spice Girls**: Aqua; Backstreet Boys; Boyzone; Five	**The Prodigy**: Dario G; Faithless; Fatboy Slim; Madonna
Best Rock	Best Rap
**Aerosmith**: Garbage; Marilyn Manson; Rammstein; The Smashing Pumpkins	**Beastie Boys**: Busta Rhymes; Missy Elliott; Pras; Puff Daddy
Free Your Mind
**B92**

== Regional nominations ==
Winners are in bold text.

MTV Select — Central	MTV Select — Southern
**Franka Potente and Thomas D**: Die Ärzte; Guano Apes; Liquido; Oli.P	**Bluvertigo**: 99 Posse; Articolo 31; Ligabue; Vasco Rossi
MTV Select — Northern	MTV Select — UK and Ireland
**Eagle-Eye Cherry**: Aqua; Cue; Drömhus; Robyn	**Five**: Another Level; B*Witched; Billie; Steps

== Performances ==
- Faithless (featuring Sally Bradshaw) — "God is a DJ"
- Madonna — "The Power of Good-Bye"
- All Saints — "Lady Marmalade"
- R.E.M. — "Daysleeper"
- Busta Rhymes — "Turn It Up / Gimme Some More"
- Manic Street Preachers — "If You Tolerate This Your Children Will Be Next"
- Aqua — "Turn Back Time / Barbie Girl / Lollipop (Candyman) / Doctor Jones"
- Pras (featuring Destiny's Child and The Product G&B) — "Blue Angels / Ghetto Supastar (That Is What You Are)"
- Five — "Everybody Get Up"
- Rammstein — "Du Hast"
- Robbie Williams — "Millennium / Let Me Entertain You"

== Appearances ==
- George Michael — presented Best Male
- Donatella Versace and Alessandro Del Piero — presented Best Group
- Natalie Imbruglia and Gavin Rossdale — presented Best Dance
- Cleopatra — presented MTV Select—UK & Ireland
- Skunk Anansie (Skin and Mark Richardson) and The Cranberries (Dolores O'Riordan and Fergal Lawler) — presented Best Song
- Fun Lovin' Criminals — presented Best Rock
- Ronan Keating and Dolce & Gabbana — presented Best Female
- B*Witched and Ulf Ekberg — presented MTV Select—Northern
- Eagle-Eye Cherry and Busta Rhymes — presented Best Pop
- Nek and Saffron — presented MTV Select—Central
- Zucchero and Renzo Rosso — presented MTV Select—Southern
- R.E.M. — presented the Free Your Mind award
- Jean Paul Gaultier and Giorgio Armani — presented Breakthrough Artist
- RZA and Ultra Naté — presented Best Rap
- Sarah, Duchess of York — presented Best Video
- Damon Albarn and Ronaldo — presented Best Album

== See also ==
- 1998 MTV Video Music Awards
