= 1994 MTV Europe Music Awards =

Music awards show held in Berlin, Germany

- Date: 24 November 1994
- Location: Front of Brandenburg Gate, Berlin, Germany
- Hosted by: Tom Jones
- Most nominations: Aerosmith

Television/radio coverage
- Network: MTV Networks International (Europe)
- Produced by: David Flack, Sara Martin

The first MTV Europe Music Awards were held on 24 November 1994, at Brandenburg Gate, Berlin, Germany, five years after the fall of the Berlin Wall and four years after reunification. Hosted by Tom Jones, the show featured performances by Aerosmith, Björk, Roxette, Take That and George Michael. Presenters included East 17, Jean Paul Gaultier, Naomi Campbell, Pamela Anderson and model Helena Christensen, who kissed INXS's Michael Hutchence live on stage.

== Nominations ==
Winners are in bold text.

| Best Song | Best Director |
|---|---|
| **Youssou N'Dour and Neneh Cherry — "7 Seconds"**; Aerosmith — "Cryin'"; Beck — "Loser"; Björk — "Big Time Sensuality"; Blur — "Girls & Boys" | **Mark Pellington (Whale — "Hobo Humpin' Slobo Babe")**; Julien Temple (Enigma — "Return to Innocence"); Spike Jonze (Beastie Boys — "Sabotage"); Stephane Sednaoui (MC Solaar — "Nouveau Western"); Wim Wenders and Mark Neale (U2 — "Stay (Faraway, So Close!)") |
| Best Female | Best Male |
| **Mariah Carey**; Björk; Marusha; Neneh Cherry; Tori Amos | **Bryan Adams**; Bruce Springsteen; MC Solaar; Prince; Seal |
| Best Group | Breakthrough Artist |
| **Take That**; Aerosmith; Beastie Boys; Crowded House; Rage Against the Machine | **Crash Test Dummies**; Beck; Deus; Therapy?; Whale |
| Best Dance | Best Rock |
| **The Prodigy**; 2 Unlimited; D Ream; Jam & Spoon; Reel 2 Real | **Aerosmith**; Metallica; Rage Against the Machine; Soundgarden; Therapy? |
| Best Cover | Local Hero |
| **Gun — "Word Up!"**; Ace of Base — "Don't Turn Around"; Big Mountain — "Baby, I Love Your Way"; Pet Shop Boys — "Go West"; Wet Wet Wet — "Love Is All Around" | **Alain Bashung (France)**; **An Emotional Fish (Ireland)**; **Bravo (Russia)**; **Deus (Belgium)**; **Devotion (Norway)**; **De Mono (Poland)**; **E-Type (Sweden)**; **H-Blockx (Germany)**; **Irene Grandi (Italy)**; **Oasis (United Kingdom)**; **Rita (Israel)**; **Vanessa (Czech Republic)**; **Van Dik Hout (Netherlands)** |
Free Your Mind
**Amnesty International**

== Performances ==
List of musical performances
| Artist(s) | Song(s) |
|---|---|
| George Michael | "Freedom! '90" |
| Aerosmith | "Walk on Water" "Cryin'" |
| Roxette | "Sleeping in My Car" |
| Take That | "Sure" |
| Björk with Fluke | "Big Time Sensuality" |
| Ennio Marchetto | |
| Eros Ramazzotti | "Cose della vita" |
| Therapy? | "Die Laughing" |
| Ace of Base | "Living in Danger" |
| Tom Jones | "If I Only Knew" |
| George Michael | "Jesus to a Child" |
| Prince | "Peach" |

== Appearances ==
- Helena Christensen and Michael Hutchence – presented Best Song
- Tracey Ullman – presented Best Male
- Jean Paul Gaultier and Naomi Campbell – presented Best Dance
- Alexi Lalas and Dave Mustaine – presented Best Female
- Pamela Anderson and East 17 – presented Best Rock
- Herbert Grönemeyer and Marusha – presented Best Cover
- Youssou N’Dour and Neneh Cherry – presented Breakthrough Artist
- Bono – accepted Free Your Mind on behalf of Amnesty International
- Steven Tyler and Joe Perry – presented Best Director
- Bryan Adams – presented Best Group

== See also ==
- 1994 MTV Video Music Awards
