= MTV Europe Music Award for Web Award =

The following is a list of the MTV Europe Music Award winners and nominees for Web Award.

== 2000s ==
Year	Winner	Nominees
2001	Limp Bizkit (http://www.limpbizkit.com)	Daft Punk (http://www.daftpunk.com); Depeche Mode (http://www.depechemode.com); Gorillaz (http://www.gorillaz.com); U2 (http://www.u2.com)
2002	Moby (http://www.moby.com)	Black Rebel Motorcycle Club (http://www.blackrebelmotorcycleclub.com); David Bowie (http://www.davidbowie.com); Linkin Park (http://www.linkinpark.com); U2 (http://www.u2.com)
2003	Goldfrapp (https://web.archive.org/web/20181014025758/https://www.goldfrapp.co.uk/)	Junior Senior (http://www.juniorsenior.com); Madonna (http://www.madonna.com); Marilyn Manson (http://www.marilynmanson.com); Queens of the Stone Age (http://www.qotsa.com)
2007 ^{[a]}	Tokio Hotel (www.tokiohotel.com)	Thirty Seconds to Mars (www.30secondstomars.com); Depeche Mode (www.depechemode.com); Fall Out Boy (www.falloutboyrock.com); My Chemical Romance (www.mychemicalromance.com)

^{^[a]}Best Inter Act

== See also ==
- MTV Video Music Award for Best Artist Website
