= 1995 MTV Europe Music Awards =

Music awards show held in Paris, France

- Date: 23 November 1995
- Location: Le Zénith, Paris, France
- Hosted by: Jean-Paul Gaultier
- Most nominations: Bon Jovi, Michael Jackson (3)

Television/radio coverage
- Network: MTV Networks International (Europe)
- Produced by: Sara Martin

The 1995 MTV Europe Music Awards took place at the Le Zénith in Paris, France and were hosted by Jean-Paul Gaultier.

The French nuclear testing in the South Pacific got the most attention at the ceremony. Jon Bon Jovi during his speech for winning the award for Best Rock said: "The only enemy is ignorance. Peace, people. Let's get rid of all this nuclear testing." and Bono said: "What a city, what a night, what a crowd, what a bomb, what a mistake, what a wanker you have for a President" referring to nuclear testing and then-French President Jacques Chirac. Greenpeace, the environmental group that has staged creative and controversial protests around the testing site at Mururoa Atoll, took the Free Your Mind award for its campaign against the underground nuclear blasts. "Stop abusing the earth," urged Madonna in a videotaped segment before the designer agnès b. picked up the award for Greenpeace.

The awards are also notable for the portfolio given to approximately 200 attendees, Outbreak of Violets, which is an extremely rare work by comics writer Alan Moore. Written by Moore and drawn by 24 different European artists, the work is a sequence of 24 postcards and has never been reprinted. It is believed to be Moore’s rarest work and described by collectors as his Holy Grail.

== Nominations ==
Winners are in bold text.

Best Song	Best Director
**The Cranberries — "Zombie"**: Michael Jackson — "You Are Not Alone"; Seal — "Kiss from a Rose"; The Offspring — "Self Esteem"; TLC — "Waterfalls"	**Michel Gondry (Massive Attack with Tracey Thorn — "Protection")**: Mark Romanek (Michael Jackson and Janet Jackson — "Scream"); Jean-Baptiste Mondino (Madonna — "Human Nature"); Spike Jonze (Weezer — "Buddy Holly"); W.I.Z. (Therapy? — "Loose")
Best Female	Best Male
**Björk**: Janet Jackson; Madonna; PJ Harvey; Sheryl Crow	**Michael Jackson**: Dr. Dre; Lenny Kravitz; Neil Young; Scatman John
Best Group	Breakthrough Artist
**U2**: Blur; Bon Jovi; Green Day; R.E.M.	**Dog Eat Dog**: Alanis Morissette; H-Blockx; Portishead; Weezer
Best Dance	Best Rock
**East 17**: Ini Kamoze; La Bouche; Moby; Sin with Sebastian	**Bon Jovi**: Green Day; Oasis; The Offspring; Therapy?
Best Live Act	
**Take That**: Bon Jovi; R.E.M.; The Prodigy; The Rolling Stones	
Free Your Mind
**Greenpeace**

== Performances ==
- Simply Red — "Fairground"
- East 17 — "Thunder"
- H-Blockx — "Risin' High"
- David Bowie — "The Man Who Sold the World"
- Blur — "The Universal"
- Bon Jovi — "Hey God"
- The Cranberries — "Zombie"
- MC Solaar and Diana King — "Is This Love"
- Take That — "Back for Good"

== Appearances ==
- The Edge and Björk — presented Best Song
- Carla Bruni and Robbie Williams — presented Best Rock
- Eva Herzigova and Jarvis Cocker — presented Best Male
- Patsy Kensit and Michael Hutchence — presented Breakthrough Artist
- Jean-Paul Gaultier and Karen Mulder — presented Best Director
- Jovanotti and Sven Väth — presented Best Dance
- George Michael — presented Free Your Mind Award
- agnès b. — accepted Free Your Mind on behalf of Greenpeace
- Zucchero and Nina Hagen — presented Best Group
- Kylie Minogue and Ray Cokes — presented Best Live Act
- Jean-Claude Van Damme — presented Best Female

== See also ==
- 1995 MTV Video Music Awards
