= MTV Europe Music Award for Best Group =

Category of MTV Europe Music Awards

The MTV Europe Music Award for Best Group is one of the original general awards that has been handed at the MTV Europe Music Awards. It was awarded every year from 1994 to 2009 and from 2018 to 2021. The award was revived once again in 2023, but ultimately it was one of the three categories for which no winner was announced, along with the awards for the Biggest Fans and Best Israeli Act.

The Spice Girls, the Backstreet Boys and Linkin Park have all won the award twice. The world-famous South Korean group BTS won the award four times in a row, winning in every year they were nominated.

U2 is the group that was nominated more times, having been nominated five times between 1995 and 2005.

== Winners and nominees ==
Winners are listed first and highlighted in bold.

† indicates an MTV Video Music Award for Best Group Video–winning artist.
‡ indicates an MTV Video Music Award for Best Group Video–nominated artist that same year.

=== 1990s ===
Year	Artist	Ref
1994
1994	**Take That**	
1994	Aerosmith †	
1994	Beastie Boys ‡	
1994	Crowded House	
1994	Rage Against the Machine	
1995
1995	**U2**	
1995	Blur	
1995	Bon Jovi	
1995	Green Day	
1995	R.E.M.	
1996
1996	**Oasis**	
1996	The Fugees ‡	
1996	Garbage	
1996	Pulp	
1996	The Smashing Pumpkins	
1997
1997	**Spice Girls**	
1997	Oasis	
1997	The Prodigy	
1997	Radiohead	
1997	U2	
1998
1998	**Spice Girls**	
1998	All Saints	
1998	Backstreet Boys †	
1998	Beastie Boys	
1998	Garbage ‡	
1999
1999	**Backstreet Boys ‡**	
1999	The Cardigans	
1999	Jamiroquai	
1999	The Offspring	
1999	TLC †	

=== 2000s ===
Year	Artist	Ref
2000
2000	**Backstreet Boys**	
2000	Blink 182 †	
2000	Bon Jovi	
2000	Red Hot Chili Peppers ‡	
2000	Travis	
2001
2001	**Limp Bizkit**	
2001	Destiny's Child ‡	
2001	Gorillaz	
2001	R.E.M.	
2001	U2 ‡	
2002
2002	**Linkin Park ‡**	
2002	Coldplay	
2002	No Doubt †	
2002	Red Hot Chili Peppers	
2002	U2	
2003
2003	**Coldplay †**	
2003	Evanescence	
2003	Metallica	
2003	Radiohead	
2003	The White Stripes ‡	
2004
2004	**Outkast**	
2004	Beastie Boys	
2004	The Black Eyed Peas	
2004	D12 ‡	
2004	Maroon 5 ‡	
2005
2005	**Gorillaz**	
2005	The Black Eyed Peas ‡	
2005	Coldplay	
2005	Green Day †	
2005	U2 ‡	
2006
2006	**Depeche Mode**	
2006	The Black Eyed Peas	
2006	Keane	
2006	The Pussycat Dolls	
2006	Red Hot Chili Peppers ‡	
2007
2007	**Linkin Park**	
2007	Fall Out Boy †	
2007	Good Charlotte	
2007	My Chemical Romance	
2007	Tokio Hotel	
2009
2009	**Tokio Hotel**	
2009	The Black Eyed Peas	
2009	Green Day	
2009	Jonas Brothers	
2009	Kings of Leon	

=== 2010s ===
Year	Artist	Ref
2018
2018	**BTS**	
2018	5 Seconds of Summer	
2018	Chloe x Halle	
2018	Maroon 5	
2018	Migos	
2018	PrettyMuch	
2019
2019	**BTS †**	
2019	Blackpink ‡	
2019	CNCO ‡	
2019	Little Mix	
2019	Monsta X	
2019	5 Seconds of Summer ‡	
2019	Jonas Brothers ‡	
2019	The 1975	

=== 2020s ===
Year	Artist	Ref
2020
2020	**BTS †**	
2020	5 Seconds of Summer ‡	
2020	Blackpink ‡	
2020	Chloe x Halle ‡	
2020	CNCO ‡	
2020	Little Mix ‡	
2021
2021	**BTS †**	
2021	Imagine Dragons	
2021	Jonas Brothers ‡	
2021	Little Mix	
2021	Måneskin	
2021	Silk Sonic ‡	
2022	—	
2023
2023	Aespa	
2023	Flo ‡	
2023	Jonas Brothers ‡	
2023	Måneskin ‡	
2023	NewJeans	
2023	OneRepublic	
2023	Seventeen ‡	
2023	Tomorrow X Together ‡	

== See also ==
- MTV Video Music Award for Best Group Video
