= MTV Europe Music Award for Best Push Act =

Annual music award

The MTV Europe Music Award for Best Push Act (Best Breakthrough Artist) was first awarded in 2009.

== Winners and nominees ==
Winners are listed first and highlighted in bold.

=== 2000s ===
Year	Artist	Debut Month	Ref
2009
2009	**Pixie Lott**	**August 2009**	
2009	Metro Station	March 2009	
2009	White Lies	April 2009	
2009	The Veronicas	May 2009	
2009	Daniel Merriweather	June 2009	
2009	Little Boots	July 2009	
2009	Kesha	September 2009	
2009	Hockey	October 2009	

=== 2010s ===
Year	Artist	Debut Month	Ref
2010
2010	**Justin Bieber**	**April 2010**	
2010	La Roux	November 2009	
2010	Alexandra Burke	January 2010	
2010	Jason Derülo	February 2010	
2010	Selena Gomez and the Scene	March 2010	
2010	B.o.B	May 2010	
2010	The Drums	June 2010	
2010	Professor Green	July 2010	
2010	Hurts	August 2010	
2010	Mike Posner	September 2010	
2011
2011	**Bruno Mars**	**October 2010**	
2011	Far East Movement	November 2010	
2011	Neon Trees	January 2011	
2011	Alexis Jordan	February 2011	
2011	Big Time Rush	March 2011	
2011	Jessie J	April 2011	
2011	Wiz Khalifa	May 2011	
2011	LMFAO	June 2011	
2011	Katy B	July 2011	
2011	Theophilus London	August 2011	
2011	Skylar Grey	September 2011	
2012
2012	**Carly Rae Jepsen**	**September 2012**	
2012	Foster the People	October 2011	
2012	Lana Del Rey	November 2011	
2012	Mac Miller	January 2012	
2012	Michael Kiwanuka	February 2012	
2012	Gotye	March 2012	
2012	Rebecca Ferguson	April 2012	
2012	Fun	May 2012	
2012	Rita Ora	June 2012	
2012	Conor Maynard	July 2012	
2012	Of Monsters and Men	August 2012	
2013
2013	**Austin Mahone**	**April 2013**	
2013	Karmin	October 2012	
2013	Rudimental	November 2012	
2013	Imagine Dragons	January 2013	
2013	ASAP Rocky	February 2013	
2013	Bastille	March 2013	
2013	Bridgit Mendler	May 2013	
2013	Tom Odell	June 2013	
2013	Iggy Azalea	July 2013	
2013	Icona Pop	August 2013	
2013	Twenty One Pilots	September 2013	
2014
2014	**5 Seconds of Summer**	**April 2014**	
2014	Lorde	October 2013	
2014	John Newman	November 2013	
2014	Kid Ink	January 2014	
2014	Zedd	February 2014	
2014	Cris Cab	March 2014	
2014	Sam Smith	May 2014	
2014	Kiesza	June 2014	
2014	Charli XCX	July 2014	
2014	Ariana Grande	August 2014	
2014	Jungle	September 2014	
2015
2015	**Shawn Mendes**	**April 2015**	
2015	Royal Blood	October 2014	
2015	Echosmith	November 2014	
2015	James Bay	January 2015	
2015	Kwabs	February 2015	
2015	Years & Years	March 2015	
2015	Tori Kelly	May 2015	
2015	Jess Glynne	June 2015	
2015	Shamir	July 2015	
2015	Natalie La Rose	August 2015	
2015	Zara Larsson	September 2015	
2016
2016	**DNCE**	**March 2016**	
2016	Alessia Cara	October 2015	
2016	Charlie Puth	November 2015	
2016	Elle King	December 2015	
2016	Halsey	January 2016	
2016	Jack Garratt	February 2016	
2016	Dua Lipa	April 2016	
2016	Lukas Graham	May 2016	
2016	Bebe Rexha	June 2016	
2016	Anne-Marie	July 2016	
2016	Blossoms	August 2016	
2016	Jonas Blue	September 2016	
2017
2017	**Hailee Steinfeld**	**November 2016**	
2017	Petite Meller	October 2016	
2017	The Head and the Heart	December 2016	
2017	Rag'n'Bone Man	January 2017	
2017	Jon Bellion	February 2017	
2017	Julia Michaels	March 2017	
2017	Noah Cyrus	April 2017	
2017	Kyle	May 2017	
2017	Khalid	June 2017	
2017	Kacy Hill	July 2017	
2017	SZA	August 2017	
2018
2018	**Grace VanderWaal**	**December 2017**	
2018	Why Don't We	November 2017	
2018	PrettyMuch	October 2017	
2018	Bishop Briggs	January 2018	
2018	Superorganism	February 2018	
2018	Jessie Reyez	March 2018	
2018	Hayley Kiyoko	April 2018	
2018	Lil Xan	May 2018	
2018	Sigrid	June 2018	
2018	Chloe x Halle	July 2018	
2018	Bazzi	August 2018	
2018	Jorja Smith	September 2018	
2019
2019	**Ava Max**	**September 2019**	
2019	Lauv	October 2018	
2019	Juice Wrld	November 2018	
2019	Rosalía	January 2019	
2019	H.E.R.	February 2019	
2019	Jade Bird	March 2019	
2019	Billie Eilish	April 2019	
2019	Lizzo	May 2019	
2019	CNCO	June 2019	
2019	Mabel	July 2019	
2019	Kiana Ledé	August 2019	
2019	Lewis Capaldi	October 2019	

=== 2020s ===
Year	Artist	Debut Month	Ref
2020
2020	**Yungblud**	**August 2020**	
2020	AJ Mitchell	November 2019	
2020	Georgia	December 2019	
2020	Brockhampton	January 2020	
2020	Conan Gray	February 2020	
2020	Lil Tecca	March 2020	
2020	Doja Cat	April 2020	
2020	Jack Harlow	May 2020	
2020	Benee	June 2020	
2020	Tate McRae	July 2020	
2020	Wallows	September 2020	
2020	Ashnikko	October 2020	
2021
2021	**Olivia Rodrigo**	**May 2021**	
2021	Saint Jhn	November 2020	
2021	24kGoldn	December 2020	
2021	JC Stewart	January 2021	
2021	Latto	February 2021	
2021	Madison Beer	March 2021	
2021	The Kid Laroi	April 2021	
2021	Girl in Red	June 2021	
2021	Fousheé	July 2021	
2021	Jxdn	August 2021	
2021	Griff	September 2021	
2021	Remi Wolf	October 2021	
2022
2022	**Seventeen**	**December 2021**	
2022	Nessa Barrett	November 2021	
2022	Mae Muller	January 2022	
2022	Gayle	February 2022	
2022	Shenseea	March 2022	
2022	Omar Apollo	April 2022	
2022	Wet Leg	May 2022	
2022	Muni Long	June 2022	
2022	Doechii	July 2022	
2022	Saucy Santana	August 2022	
2022	Stephen Sanchez	September 2022	
2022	Jvke	October 2022	
~~2023~~ (Note: Cancelled due to the Gaza war)
~~2023~~	**Tomorrow X Together**	**April 2023**	
~~2023~~	Flo Milli	November 2022	
~~2023~~	Reneé Rapp	December 2022	
~~2023~~	Sam Ryder	January 2023	
~~2023~~	Armani White	February 2023	
~~2023~~	Fletcher	March 2023	
~~2023~~	Ice Spice	May 2023	
~~2023~~	FLO	June 2023	
~~2023~~	Lauren Spencer-Smith	July 2023	
~~2023~~	Kaliii	August 2023	
~~2023~~	GloRilla	September 2023	
~~2023~~	Benson Boone	October 2023	
2024
2024	**Le Sserafim**	**June 2024**	
2024	Coco Jones	November 2023	
2024	Victoria Monét	December 2023	
2024	Jessie Murph	January 2024	
2024	Teddy Swims	February 2024	
2024	Chappell Roan	March 2024	
2024	Flyana Boss	April 2024	
2024	Laufey	May 2024	
2024	The Warning	July 2024	
2024	Shaboozey	August 2024	
2024	Ayra Starr	September 2024	
2024	Mark Ambor	October 2024	
2024	Lay Bankz	November 2024	
~~2025~~ (Note: Cancelled due to network cuts and ratings struggles)
~~2025~~	Dasha	December 2024	
~~2025~~	Katseye	January 2025	
~~2025~~	Jordan Adetunji	February 2025	
~~2025~~	Leon Thomas III	March 2025	
~~2025~~	Livingston	April 2025	
~~2025~~	Damiano David (Måneskin)	May 2025	
~~2025~~	Gigi Perez	June 2025	
~~2025~~	Role Model	July 2025	
~~2025~~	Alex Warren	August 2025	
~~2025~~	Sombr	September 2025	
~~2025~~	Adéla	October 2025	
