= 2002 MTV Europe Music Awards =

Music awards show held in Barcelona, Spain

- Date: 14 November 2002
- Location: Palau Sant Jordi, Barcelona, Catalonia, Spain
- Hosted by: P. Diddy
- Most wins: Eminem (3)
- Most nominations: Coldplay, Eminem, Kylie Minogue, Shakira (4)

Television/radio coverage
- Network: MTV Networks International (Europe)

The 2002 MTV Europe Music Awards were held at Palau Sant Jordi, Barcelona.

Performances included a rendition of "Dirrty" from Christina Aguilera featuring Redman as they performed in a boxing ring with Aguilera sporting leather chaps. Whitney Houston, Pink, Bon Jovi and Foo Fighters each performed as did Coldplay and Eminem, both making their EMA debut.

Winners on the night included Jennifer Lopez, taking Best Female for the second year running.

Kylie Minogue, Pamela Anderson, Sophie Ellis-Bextor, Jade Jagger, Pierce Brosnan. Anastacia, Rachel Roberts, and Melanie C presented awards.

== Nominations ==
Winners are in bold text.

Best Song	Best Video
**Pink — "Get the Party Started"**: Enrique Iglesias — "Hero"; Nelly — "Hot In Herre"; Nickelback — "How You Remind Me"; Shakira — "Whenever, Wherever"	**Röyksopp — "Remind Me"**: Basement Jaxx — "Where's Your Head At"; Eminem — "Without Me"; Primal Scream — "Miss Lucifer"; The White Stripes — "Fell in Love with a Girl"
Best Album	Best New Act
**Eminem — The Eminem Show**: Coldplay — A Rush of Blood to the Head; Kylie Minogue — Fever; No Doubt — Rock Steady; Pink — Missundaztood	**The Calling**: Avril Lavigne; Röyksopp; Shakira; The Strokes
Best Female	Best Male
**Jennifer Lopez**: Britney Spears; Kylie Minogue; Pink; Shakira	**Eminem**: Enrique Iglesias; Lenny Kravitz; Nelly; Robbie Williams
Best Group	Best Pop
**Linkin Park**: Coldplay; No Doubt; Red Hot Chili Peppers; U2	**Kylie Minogue**: Anastacia; Enrique Iglesias; Pink; Shakira
Best Dance	Best Rock
**Kylie Minogue**: DB Boulevard; Moby; Röyksopp; Sophie Ellis-Bextor	**Red Hot Chili Peppers**: Bon Jovi; Coldplay; Nickelback; U2
Best Hard Rock	Best R&B
**Linkin Park**: Korn; P.O.D.; Puddle of Mudd; System of a Down	**Alicia Keys**: Ashanti; Beyoncé; Jennifer Lopez; Mary J. Blige
Best Hip-Hop	Best Live Act
**Eminem**: Busta Rhymes; Ja Rule; Nelly; P. Diddy	**Red Hot Chili Peppers**: Depeche Mode; Korn; Lenny Kravitz; U2
Web Award	Free Your Mind
**Moby (www.moby.com)**: Black Rebel Motorcycle Club (www.blackrebelmotorcycleclub.com); David Bowie (www.davidbowie.com); Linkin Park (www.linkinpark.com); U2 (www.u2.com)	**Football Against Racism in Europe**

== Regional nominations ==
Winners are in bold text.

Best Dutch Act	Best French Act
**Brainpower**: Di-Rect; Kane; Sita; Tiësto	**Indochine**: David Guetta; MC Solaar; Pleymo; Saian Supa Crew
Best German Act	Best Italian Act
**Xavier Naidoo**: Die Toten Hosen; Herbert Grönemeyer; No Angels; Sportfreunde Stiller	**Subsonica**: Articolo 31; Francesco Renga; Planet Funk; Tiziano Ferro
Best Nordic Act	Best Polish Act
**Kent**: Röyksopp; Saybia; The Crash; The Hives	**Myslovitz**: Blue Café; Futro; T.Love; Wilki
Best Romanian Act	Best Russian Act
**Animal X**: B.U.G. Mafia; Class; Partizan; Zdob și Zdub	**Diskoteka Avariya**: Ariana; Epidemia; Kasta; t.A.T.u.
Best Spanish Act	Best UK & Ireland Act
**Amaral**: Enrique Bunbury; El Canto del Loco; Enrique Iglesias; Sôber	**Coldplay**: Atomic Kitten; Ms. Dynamite; Sugababes; Underworld

== Performances ==
=== Pre show ===
- t.A.T.u. — "All the Things She Said"

=== Main show ===
- Röyksopp — "Remind Me / Poor Leno"
- Pink — "Get the Party Started / Don't Let Me Get Me / Just Like a Pill"
- Eminem — "Cleanin' Out My Closet / Lose Yourself"
- Foo Fighters — "All My Life"
- Christina Aguilera (featuring Redman) — "Dirrty"
- Whitney Houston — "Whatchulookinat"
- Bon Jovi — "Everyday"
- Enrique Iglesias — "Maybe / Love to See You Cry"
- Coldplay — "In My Place"
- Robbie Williams — "Feel"
- Wyclef Jean (featuring City High and Loon) — "Pussycat"
- Moby — "In My Heart / Bodyrock"

== Appearances ==
- Pamela Anderson and Wyclef Jean — presented Best Group
- Jade Jagger and Pharrell Williams — presented Best R&B
- Sophie Ellis-Bextor and Holly Valance — presented Best Pop
- Pierce Brosnan — presented Best Male
- Ronan Keating and Esther Cañadas — presented Best Live Act
- Nick Carter and Rachel Roberts — presented Web Award
- Dolce & Gabbana and Sara Montiel — presented Best Female
- Moby and Ms. Dynamite — presented Best New Act
- Anastacia and Melanie C — presented Best Song
- Kylie Minogue — presented Best Hard Rock
- t.A.T.u. and The Calling— presented Best Dance
- Marilyn Manson and Kelis — presented Best Hip-Hop
- Patrick Kluivert — presented Free Your Mind
- Las Ketchup and Tiziano Ferro — presented Best Rock
- Sugababes and Patrick Kluivert — presented Best Album
- Jean Paul Gaultier and Rupert Everett — presented Best Video

== See also ==
- 2002 MTV Video Music Awards
