= 1997 MTV Europe Music Awards =

Music awards show held in Rotterdam, Netherlands

- Date: 6 November 1997
- Location: Ahoy, Rotterdam, The Netherlands
- Hosted by: Ronan Keating
- Most wins: The Prodigy (3)
- Most nominations: The Prodigy, Puff Daddy, Radiohead, Spice Girls (4)

Television/radio coverage
- Network: MTV Networks International (Europe)

The 1997 MTV Europe Music Awards were held at The Ahoy, Rotterdam, Netherlands on 6 November 1997 and were hosted by Ronan Keating. The Prodigy were the big winners of the night winning three awards including Best Video.

== Nominations ==
Winners are in bold text.

Best Song	Best Video
**Hanson — "Mmmbop"**: No Doubt — "Don't Speak"; Puff Daddy (featuring Faith Evans and 112) — "I'll Be Missing You"; The Cardigans — "Lovefool"; Will Smith — "Men in Black"	**The Prodigy — "Breathe"**: Blur — "Song 2"; Daft Punk — "Around the World"; Radiohead — "Paranoid Android"; The Chemical Brothers — "Block Rockin' Beats"
Best Female	Best Male
**Janet Jackson**: Björk; Madonna; Sheryl Crow; Toni Braxton	**Jon Bon Jovi**: Babyface; Beck; George Michael; Michael Jackson
Best Group	Breakthrough Artist
**Spice Girls**: Oasis; Radiohead; The Prodigy; U2	**Hanson**: Meredith Brooks; No Doubt; Puff Daddy; Spice Girls
Best Dance	Best Rock
**The Prodigy**: Backstreet Boys; Daft Punk; Spice Girls; The Chemical Brothers	**Oasis**: Aerosmith; Bush; Jon Bon Jovi; Skunk Anansie
Best Alternative	Best R&B
**The Prodigy**: Beck; Blur; Radiohead; The Verve	**Blackstreet**: Ginuwine; Michael Jackson; R. Kelly; Toni Braxton
Best Rap	Best Live Act
**Will Smith**: Blackstreet; Coolio; Puff Daddy; The Notorious B.I.G.	**U2**: Aerosmith; Michael Jackson; Radiohead; Skunk Anansie
MTV Select	
**Backstreet Boys — "As Long as You Love Me"**: Hanson — "Where's the Love"; Puff Daddy (featuring Faith Evans and 112) — "I'll Be Missing You"; Spice Girls — "Spice Up Your Life"	
Free Your Mind
**Landmine Survivors Network**

== Performances ==
- U2 — "Mofo"
- Björk — "Bachelorette"
- Spice Girls — "Spice Up Your Life"
- Skunk Anansie — "Hedonism (Just Because You Feel Good)"
- LL Cool J — "Phenomenon"
- Blackstreet (featuring Slash) — "Fix"
- Jon Bon Jovi — "Janie, Don't Take Your Love To Town"
- Aerosmith — "Pink / Falling in Love (Is Hard on the Knees)"
- Backstreet Boys — "As Long as You Love Me / Everybody (Backstreet's Back)"
- Jovanotti — "L'ombelico del mondo"

== Appearances ==
- Dennis Hopper — introduced U2
- Alicia Silverstone — presented Best Dance
- Backstreet Boys — presented Best Male
- Tony Mortimer and Karen Mulder — presented Best Rock
- Stephen Dorff and Saffron — presented Best Song
- Missy Elliott and David Arquette — presented Best Rap
- Louise and Mark Owen — presented Best Female
- Peter Andre and Eternal — presented Best Alternative
- Dennis Hopper — presented Free Your Mind Award
- Caprice Bourret and Steven Tyler — presented Best Group
- Nina Persson, Peter Svensson and Katja Schuurman — presented MTV Select
- Robbie Williams and Gena Lee Nolin — presented Best New Act
- Shola Ama and MC Solaar — presented Best R&B
- Prince Naseem and Björk — presented Best Live Act
- Hanson — presented Best Video

== See also ==
- 1997 MTV Video Music Awards
