= MTV Europe Music Award for Best Pop =

Category of MTV Europe Music Awards

- Description: Best pop act
- Presented by: MTV Europe Music Awards
- Most wins: One Direction (3 awards)
- Website: www.mtvema.com

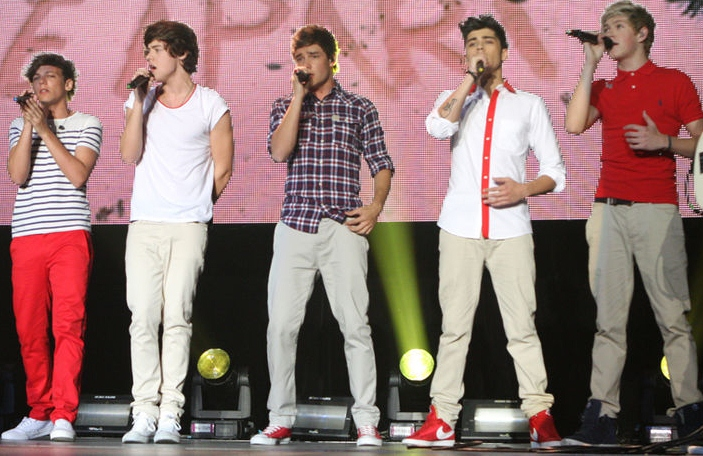
One Direction performs at Hordern Pavilion, Moore Park, Sydney, Australia 2012.

The MTV Europe Music Award for Best Pop was first presented in 1998. British girl group the Spice Girls were the first ever act to receive the award. American singer Britney Spears was the first solo female artist to win the award in 1999, while American singer Justin Timberlake was the first male solo artist to win in 2003. South Korean boy group BTS are the first Kpop act to be nominated in this category in 2020. British boy band One Direction are currently the act with the most award wins in this category, receiving a total of three. Ariana Grande is the most recent winner, winning in 2024.

== Winners and nominees ==
Winners are listed first and highlighted in bold.

† indicates an MTV Video Music Award for Best Pop Video–winning artist.
‡ indicates an MTV Video Music Award for Best Pop Video–nominated artist that same year.

=== 1990s ===
Year	Artist	Ref
1998
1998	**Spice Girls**	
1998	Aqua	
1998	Backstreet Boys	
1998	Boyzone	
1998	Five	
1999
1999	**Britney Spears ‡**	
1999	Backstreet Boys ‡	
1999	Boyzone	
1999	Five	
1999	Ricky Martin †	

=== 2000s ===
Year	Artist	Ref
2000
2000	**All Saints**	
2000	Backstreet Boys	
2000	*NSYNC †	
2000	Britney Spears ‡	
2000	Robbie Williams	
2001
2001	**Anastacia**	
2001	Atomic Kitten	
2001	*NSYNC †	
2001	Shaggy	
2001	Britney Spears ‡	
2002
2002	**Kylie Minogue**	
2002	Anastacia	
2002	Enrique Iglesias	
2002	Pink ‡	
2002	Shakira ‡	
2003
2003	**Justin Timberlake †**	
2003	Christina Aguilera ‡	
2003	Kylie Minogue	
2003	Pink	
2003	Robbie Williams	
2004
2004	**The Black Eyed Peas**	
2004	Anastacia	
2004	Avril Lavigne ‡	
2004	Britney Spears ‡	
2004	Robbie Williams	
2005
2005	**The Black Eyed Peas**	
2005	Gorillaz	
2005	Shakira	
2005	Gwen Stefani ‡	
2005	Robbie Williams	
2006
2006	**Justin Timberlake**	
2006	Christina Aguilera ‡	
2006	Madonna ‡	
2006	Shakira ‡	
2006	Robbie Williams	

=== 2010s ===
Year	Artist	Ref
2010
2010	**Lady Gaga †**	
2010	Miley Cyrus	
2010	Katy Perry ‡	
2010	Rihanna	
2010	Usher	
2011
2011	**Justin Bieber**	
2011	Britney Spears †	
2011	Katy Perry ‡	
2011	Lady Gaga	
2011	Rihanna	
2012
2012	**Justin Bieber ‡**	
2012	Katy Perry	
2012	No Doubt	
2012	Rihanna ‡	
2012	Taylor Swift	
2013
2013	**One Direction**	
2013	Justin Bieber	
2013	Miley Cyrus ‡	
2013	Katy Perry	
2013	Taylor Swift	
2014
2014	**One Direction**	
2014	5 Seconds of Summer	
2014	Ariana Grande †	
2014	Miley Cyrus	
2014	Katy Perry	
2015
2015	**One Direction**	
2015	5 Seconds of Summer	
2015	Ariana Grande	
2015	Justin Bieber	
2015	Taylor Swift †	
2016
2016	**Fifth Harmony**	
2016	Ariana Grande ‡	
2016	Justin Bieber ‡	
2016	Rihanna	
2016	Selena Gomez	
2016	Shawn Mendes	
2017
2017	**Camila Cabello**	
2017	Demi Lovato	
2017	Miley Cyrus ‡	
2017	Shawn Mendes ‡	
2017	Taylor Swift	
2018
2018	**Dua Lipa**	
2018	Ariana Grande †	
2018	Camila Cabello ‡	
2018	Hailee Steinfeld	
2018	Shawn Mendes ‡	
2019
2019	**Halsey**	
2019	Ariana Grande ‡	
2019	Becky G	
2019	Camila Cabello	
2019	Jonas Brothers †	
2019	Shawn Mendes	

=== 2020s ===
Year	Artist	Ref
2020
2020	**Little Mix**	
2020	BTS †	
2020	Dua Lipa	
2020	Harry Styles	
2020	Justin Bieber ‡	
2020	Katy Perry	
2020	Lady Gaga ‡	
2021
2021	**BTS ‡**	
2021	Doja Cat	
2021	Dua Lipa	
2021	Ed Sheeran	
2021	Justin Bieber †	
2021	Olivia Rodrigo ‡	
2022
2022	**Taylor Swift**	
2022	Billie Eilish ‡	
2022	Doja Cat ‡	
2022	Ed Sheeran ‡	
2022	Harry Styles †	
2022	Lizzo ‡	
2023
2023	**Billie Eilish**	
2023	Dua Lipa ‡	
2023	Ed Sheeran	
2023	Miley Cyrus ‡	
2023	Olivia Rodrigo ‡	
2023	Taylor Swift †	
2024
2024	**Ariana Grande**	
2024	Billie Eilish	
2024	Camila Cabello ‡	
2024	Charli XCX	
2024	Dua Lipa ‡	
2024	Sabrina Carpenter ‡	
2024	Taylor Swift †	

== Statistics ==
As of 2018.

Number of European Nominations	Total Number
17	70

== See also ==
- MTV Video Music Award for Best Pop Video
