= MTV Europe Music Award for Best Rock =

Category of MTV Europe Music Awards

The MTV Europe Music Award for Best Rock has been awarded since 1994. During the 2002 ceremony the category was separated, creating an additional award entitled Best Hard Rock Act. The category was briefly retitled to this during the 2007 and 2008 ceremonies, before reverting to its original name during the following year. Linkin Park holds the most wins, with five, followed by Coldplay and Green Day, both with four.

== Winners and nominees ==
Winners are listed first and highlighted in bold.

† indicates an MTV Video Music Award for Best Rock Video–winning artist.
‡ indicates an MTV Video Music Award for Best Rock Video–nominated artist that same year.

=== 1990s ===
Year	Artist	Ref
1994
1994	**Aerosmith ‡**	
1994	Metallica	
1994	Rage Against the Machine	
1994	Soundgarden †	
1994	Therapy?	
1995
1995	**Bon Jovi**	
1995	Green Day ‡	
1995	Oasis	
1995	The Offspring	
1995	Therapy?	
1996
1996	**The Smashing Pumpkins**	
1996	Bon Jovi	
1996	Die Toten Hosen	
1996	Metallica †	
1996	Oasis	
1997
1997	**Oasis**	
1997	Aerosmith †	
1997	Jon Bon Jovi	
1997	Bush	
1997	Skunk Anansie	
1998
1998	**Aerosmith †**	
1998	Garbage	
1998	Marilyn Manson	
1998	Rammstein	
1998	The Smashing Pumpkins	
1999
1999	**The Offspring ‡**	
1999	The Cardigans	
1999	Lenny Kravitz ‡	
1999	Marilyn Manson	
1999	Red Hot Chili Peppers	

=== 2000s ===
Year	Artist	Ref
2000
2000	**Red Hot Chili Peppers**	
2000	Bon Jovi	
2000	Foo Fighters	
2000	Korn ‡	
2000	Limp Bizkit †	
2001
2001	**Blink 182**	
2001	Crazy Town	
2001	Limp Bizkit †	
2001	Linkin Park ‡	
2001	U2	
2002
2002	**Red Hot Chili Peppers**	
2002	Bon Jovi	
2002	Coldplay	
2002	Nickelback	
2002	U2	
2002	Best Hard Rock Act	
2002	**Linkin Park †**	
2002	Korn ‡	
2002	P.O.D. ‡	
2002	Puddle of Mudd	
2002	System of a Down ‡	
2003
2003	**The White Stripes**	
2003	Good Charlotte ‡	
2003	Linkin Park †	
2003	Metallica ‡	
2003	Red Hot Chili Peppers	
2004
2004	**Linkin Park ‡**	
2004	The Darkness ‡	
2004	Good Charlotte	
2004	Green Day	
2004	Red Hot Chili Peppers	
2005
2005	**Green Day †**	
2005	Coldplay	
2005	Foo Fighters ‡	
2005	Franz Ferdinand	
2005	U2	
2006
2006	**The Killers**	
2006	Evanescence	
2006	Keane	
2006	Red Hot Chili Peppers ‡	
2006	The Strokes	
2007
2007	**Thirty Seconds to Mars**	
2007	Evanescence	
2007	Fall Out Boy	
2007	Linkin Park	
2007	My Chemical Romance	
2008
2008	**Thirty Seconds to Mars**	
2008	Linkin Park †	
2008	Metallica	
2008	Paramore ‡	
2008	Slipknot ‡	
2009
2009	**Green Day †**	
2009	Foo Fighters	
2009	Kings of Leon ‡	
2009	Linkin Park	
2009	U2	

=== 2010s ===
Year	Artist	Ref
2010
2010	**Thirty Seconds to Mars †**	
2010	Kings of Leon	
2010	Linkin Park	
2010	Muse ‡	
2010	Ozzy Osbourne	
2011
2011	**Linkin Park**	
2011	Coldplay	
2011	Foo Fighters †	
2011	Kings of Leon	
2011	Red Hot Chili Peppers	
2012
2012	**Linkin Park ‡**	
2012	Coldplay †	
2012	Green Day	
2012	The Killers	
2012	Muse	
2013
2013	**Green Day**	
2013	Black Sabbath	
2013	The Killers	
2013	Kings of Leon	
2013	Queens of the Stone Age	
2014
2014	**Linkin Park ‡**	
2014	Arctic Monkeys ‡	
2014	The Black Keys ‡	
2014	Coldplay	
2014	Imagine Dragons ‡	
2015
2015	**Coldplay**	
2015	Foo Fighters	
2015	Muse	
2015	Royal Blood	
2015	AC/DC	
2016
2016	**Coldplay ‡**	
2016	Green Day	
2016	Metallica	
2016	Muse	
2016	Red Hot Chili Peppers	
2017
2017	**Coldplay ‡**	
2017	Foo Fighters ‡	
2017	Royal Blood	
2017	The Killers	
2017	U2	
2018
2018	**5 Seconds of Summer**	
2018	Foo Fighters ‡	
2018	Imagine Dragons †	
2018	Muse	
2018	U2	
2019
2019	**Green Day**	
2019	Imagine Dragons ‡	
2019	Liam Gallagher	
2019	Panic! at the Disco †	
2019	The 1975 ‡	

=== 2020s ===
Year	Artist	Ref
2020
2020	**Coldplay †**	
2020	Green Day ‡	
2020	Liam Gallagher	
2020	Pearl Jam	
2020	Tame Impala	
2020	The Killers ‡	
2021
2021	**Måneskin**	
2021	Coldplay	
2021	Foo Fighters ‡	
2021	Imagine Dragons	
2021	Kings of Leon ‡	
2021	The Killers ‡	
2022
2022	**Muse** ‡	
2022	Foo Fighters ‡	
2022	Måneskin	
2022	Red Hot Chili Peppers †	
2022	Liam Gallagher	
2022	The Killers	
2023
2023	**Måneskin †**	
2023	Arctic Monkeys	
2023	Foo Fighters ‡	
2023	Metallica ‡	
2023	Red Hot Chili Peppers ‡	
2023	The Killers	
2024
2024	**Liam Gallagher**	
2024	Coldplay ‡	
2024	Green Day ‡	
2024	Kings of Leon ‡	
2024	Lenny Kravitz †	
2024	Bon Jovi ‡	
2024	The Killers	

== Multiple wins and nominations ==
Wins	Artist
5	Linkin Park
4	Coldplay
4	Green Day
3	Thirty Seconds to Mars
2	Aerosmith
2	Måneskin
2	Red Hot Chili Peppers

Nominations	Artist
11	Coldplay
11	Linkin Park
10	Green Day
9	Foo Fighters
9	Red Hot Chili Peppers
8	The Killers
6	Kings of Leon
6	Muse
6	U2

== See also ==
- MTV Video Music Award for Best Rock Video
