= MTV Europe Music Award for Best Male =

Category of MTV Europe Music Awards

The MTV Europe Music Award for Best Male was one of the original general awards that has been handed out every year since the inaugural MTV Europe Music Awards in 1994. In 2007 the award was renamed to Best Solo Artist rewarding the soloists of both sexes, in 2008 the award for Best Male was again eliminated from the EMAs, but it was revived again in 2009 with its original name.

== Winners and nominees ==
Winners are listed first and highlighted in bold.

† indicates an MTV Video Music Award for Best Male Video–winning artist.
‡ indicates an MTV Video Music Award for Best Male Video–nominated artist that same year.

=== 1990s ===
Year	Artist	Ref
1994
1994	**Bryan Adams**	
1994	MC Solaar	
1994	Prince	
1994	Seal	
1994	Bruce Springsteen ‡	
1995
1995	**Michael Jackson**	
1995	Dr. Dre	
1995	Lenny Kravitz	
1995	Scatman John	
1995	Neil Young	
1996
1996	**George Michael**	
1996	Bryan Adams ‡	
1996	Beck	
1996	Nick Cave	
1996	Eros Ramazzotti	
1997
1997	**Jon Bon Jovi**	
1997	Babyface ‡	
1997	Beck †	
1997	Michael Jackson	
1997	George Michael	
1998
1998	**Robbie Williams**	
1998	Eagle Eye Cherry	
1998	Puff Daddy	
1998	Ricky Martin	
1998	Will Smith †	
1999
1999	**Will Smith †**	
1999	Ricky Martin ‡	
1999	George Michael	
1999	Sasha	
1999	Robbie Williams	

=== 2000s ===
Year	Artist	Ref
2000
2000	**Ricky Martin ‡**	
2000	Eminem †	
2000	Ronan Keating	
2000	Sisqo	
2000	Robbie Williams	
2001
2001	**Robbie Williams ‡**	
2001	Craig David	
2001	Eminem ‡	
2001	Ricky Martin	
2001	Shaggy	
2002
2002	**Eminem †**	
2002	Enrique Iglesias ‡	
2002	Lenny Kravitz	
2002	Nelly ‡	
2002	Robbie Williams	
2003
2003	**Justin Timberlake †**	
2003	Craig David	
2003	Eminem ‡	
2003	Sean Paul	
2003	Robbie Williams	
2004
2004	**Usher †**	
2004	Jay Z ‡	
2004	Nelly	
2004	Justin Timberlake ‡	
2004	Robbie Williams	
2005
2005	**Robbie Williams**	
2005	50 Cent	
2005	Eminem	
2005	Moby	
2005	Snoop Dogg	
2006
2006	**Justin Timberlake**	
2006	Sean Paul	
2006	Kanye West ‡	
2006	Pharrell Williams	
2006	Robbie Williams	
2007 – 2008	—N/a	
2009
2009	**Eminem ‡**	
2009	Jay Z	
2009	Kanye West ‡	
2009	Mika	
2009	Robbie Williams	

=== 2010s ===
Year	Artist	Ref
2010
2010	**Justin Bieber**	
2010	Eminem †	
2010	Enrique Iglesias	
2010	Usher ‡	
2010	Kanye West	
2011
2011	**Justin Bieber †**	
2011	Bruno Mars ‡	
2011	David Guetta	
2011	Eminem ‡	
2011	Kanye West ‡	
2012
2012	**Justin Bieber ‡**	
2012	Flo Rida	
2012	Jay Z	
2012	Kanye West	
2012	Pitbull	
2013
2013	**Justin Bieber**	—N/a
2013	Eminem	—N/a
2013	Jay Z	—N/a
2013	Bruno Mars †	—N/a
2013	Justin Timberlake ‡	—N/a
2014		—N/a
2014	**Justin Bieber**	
2014	Ed Sheeran †	
2014	Eminem ‡	
2014	Justin Timberlake	
2014	Pharrell Williams ‡	
2015
2015	**Justin Bieber**	
2015	Jason Derulo	
2015	Ed Sheeran ‡	
2015	Kanye West	
2015	Pharrell Williams	
2016
2016	**Shawn Mendes**	
2016	Calvin Harris †	
2016	Drake ‡	
2016	Justin Bieber	
2016	The Weeknd ‡	

== Statistics ==
Number of European Nominations	Total Number
25	95

== See also ==
- MTV Video Music Award for Best Male Video
