= 1996 MTV Europe Music Awards =

Music awards show held in London, England

- Date: 14 November 1996
- Location: Alexandra Palace; London, England
- Hosted by: Robbie Williams
- Most wins: Oasis (2)
- Most nominations: Oasis (4)

Television/radio coverage
- Network: MTV Networks International (Europe)

The 1996 MTV Europe Music Awards ceremony was hosted by former Take That member Robbie Williams and held at Alexandra Palace in London, England, on 14 November 1996.

One special note was that MTV executives notified the band Metallica that expletives were prohibited during their live TV performance and they were not allowed to use pyro. The band was upset by this so the band disregarded performing their scheduled single "King Nothing" and played the non-TV friendly songs "Last Caress" and "So What?", songs that contain numerous expletives, and reference rape, murder and bestiality, respectively. The result was the performance and any references to Metallica during the ceremony have been removed from future broadcasts of the ceremony. Metallica was banned from MTV for years following this act of rebellion.

== Nominations ==
Winners are in bold text.

Best Song
**Oasis — "Wonderwall"**: Alanis Morissette — "Ironic"; Fugees — "Killing Me Softly"; Garbage — "Stupid Girl"; Pulp — "Disco 2000"
Best Female	Best Male
**Alanis Morissette**: Björk; Joan Osborne; Neneh Cherry; Toni Braxton	**George Michael**: Beck; Bryan Adams; Eros Ramazzotti; Nick Cave
Best Group	Breakthrough Artist
**Oasis**: Fugees; Garbage; Pulp; The Smashing Pumpkins	**Garbage**: Fugees; Pulp; Skunk Anansie; The Cardigans
Best Dance	Best Rock
**The Prodigy**: Everything but the Girl; Los del Río; Mark Morrison; Robert Miles	**The Smashing Pumpkins**: Bon Jovi; Die Toten Hosen; Metallica; Oasis
MTV Amour	MTV Select
**Fugees**: D'Angelo; George Michael; Madonna with Massive Attack; TLC	**Backstreet Boys — "Get Down (You're the One for Me)"**: Boyzone — "Words"; Jamiroquai — "Virtual Insanity"; Oasis — "Don't Look Back in Anger"; Spice Girls — "Wannabe"
Free Your Mind
**The Buddies and Carers of Europe**

== Performances ==
- The Fugees — "Ready or Not"
- George Michael — "Star People"
- Boyzone (featuring Peter André) — "Motown Medley" ("Dancing in the Street" / "Signed, Sealed, Delivered I'm Yours" / "Never Can Say Goodbye" / "Celebration")
- Eros Ramazzotti — "Più bella cosa"
- The Smashing Pumpkins — "Bullet with Butterfly Wings"
- Simply Red (featuring Refugee Camp) — "Angel"
- Kula Shaker — "Tattva"
- Metallica — "Last Caress / So What?" (originally meant to be King Nothing)
- Garbage — "Milk"
- Bryan Adams — "The Only Thing That Looks Good on Me Is You"

== Appearances ==
- Julian Clary — hosted a backstage party where he interviewed various celebrities
- Neneh Cherry and Jay Kay — presented Best Group
- Adam Clayton and Larry Mullen, Jr. — presented the Breakthrough award
- Jacques Villeneuve and Helena Christensen — presented Best Rock
- Richard E. Grant and Björk — presented Best Male
- Gina G and 3T — presented MTV Amour
- Joaquín Cortés and Jerry Hall — presented Best Female
- Jarvis Cocker — presented the Free Your Mind award
- Goldie and MC Solaar — presented Best Dance
- Robert Miles and Westernhagen — presented MTV Select
- Jean Paul Gaultier and Skin — presented Best Song

== See also ==
- 1996 MTV Video Music Awards
