= List of German artists nominated for MTV Europe Music Awards =

The following is a list of German artists nominated for MTV Europe Music Awards. List does not include MTV Europe Music Award for Best German Act, New Sounds of Europe or MTV Europe Music Award for Best European Act. Winners are in bold text.

| Year | Nomination | Artist | Ref |
|---|---|---|---|
| 1994 | Best Female | Marusha | |
| 1994 | Best Dance | Jam & Spoon | |
| 1994 | Best Video | Enigma | |
| 1995 | Best Dance | La Bouche | |
| 1995 | Best Dance | Sin with Sebastian | |
| 1995 | Best Breakthrough Act | H-Blockx | |
| 1996 | Best Rock | Die Toten Hosen | |
| 1998 | Best Rock | Rammstein | |
| 1999 | Best Male | Sasha | |
| 2005 | Best Video | Rammstein | |
| 2007 | Best Group | Tokio Hotel | |
| 2008 | **Headliner** | Tokio Hotel | |
| 2008 | Best Act Ever | Tokio Hotel | |
| 2009 | **Best Group** | Tokio Hotel | |
| 2010 | **Best World Stage Performance** | Tokio Hotel | |
| 2011 | Best Worldwide Act | Lena | |
| 2013 | **Biggest Fans** | Tokio Hotel | |
| 2013 | Best Worldwide Act | Lena | |
