= Special Awards at MTV Europe Music Awards =

The following is a list of the MTV Europe Music Award winners of special awards.

== Artist's Choice Award ==
Year	Winner
2007	Amy Winehouse
2008	Lil Wayne

== MTV Voice Award ==
Year	Winner
2011	Justin Bieber

== Power of Music Award ==
Year	Winner
2017	Artists for Grenfell

== Ultimate Legend Award ==
Year	Winner
2008	Paul McCartney

== Video Visionary Award ==
Year	Winner
2015	Duran Duran

== Best Act Ever ==
Year	Winner	Nominee
2008	Rick Astley	Britney Spears; Christina Aguilera; Green Day; Tokio Hotel; U2

== Best Song with a Social Message ==
Year	Winner	Nominee
2014	Beyoncé - "Pretty Hurts"	Alicia Keys - "We Are Here"; Arcade Fire - "We Exist"; Hozier - "Take Me to Church"; Meghan Trainor - "All About That Bass"

== Generation Change Award ==
Year	Winners
2018	Sonita Alizadeh; Hauwa Ojeifo; Xiuhtezcatl "X" Martinez; Mohamad Al Jounde; Ellen Jones
2019	Alfredo "Danger" Martinez; Shiden Tekle; Lisa Ranran Hu; Kelvin Doe; Jamie Margolin
2020	Luiza Brasil; Kiki Mordi; Temi Mwale; Catherhea Potjanaporn; Raquel Willis
2021	Amir Ashour; Matthew Blaise; Sage Dolan-Sandrino; Erika Hilton; Viktória Radványi

== See also ==
- MTV Europe Music Award for Global Icon
- Free Your Mind
