= List of awards and nominations received by Swedish House Mafia =

DJ supergroup Swedish House Mafia has received numerous awards and nominations. The group are best known for the songs "Don't You Worry Child" and "Save the World" and the albums Until One and Until Now. The aforementioned songs have been nominated for Best Dance Recording at the Grammy Awards and Best Single at the Grammis Awards. Having won ten awards at the International Dance Music Awards for "Don't You Worry Child", "Save the World", "One (Your Name)" and "Leave the World Behind", Swedish House Mafia has received other awards and nominations at the Billboard Music Awards, DJ Awards, European Border Breakers Award, MTVs European Music Awards and Teen Choice Awards.

== Billboard Music Awards ==
Year	Category	Work	Outcome	Ref.
2013	Top Dance/Electronic Artist (Dance artist)	—	Nominated	
2013	Top Dance/Electronic Artist (EDM artist)	—	Nominated	
2013	Top Dance/Electronic Album (EDM album)	Until Now	Nominated	
2013	Top Dance/Electronic Song	"Don't You Worry Child"	Nominated	

== DJ Awards ==
Year	Category	Outcome	Ref.
2011	Best International DJ	Nominated	
2012	Best International DJ	Nominated	

== DJ Magazine top 100 DJs ==
Year	Position	Notes	Ref.
2010	23	New Entry	
2011	10	Up 13	
2012	12	Down 2	
2013	26	Down 14	
Hiatus
2018	63	Re-entry	
2019	42	Up 21	
2020	84	Down 42	
2021	N/A	Exit	
2022	77	Re-entry	
2023	63	Up 14	
2024	39	Up 24	
2025	34	Up 5	

== European Border Breakers Award ==
Year	Work	Outcome	Ref.
2012	Until One	Won	

== Grammis Awards ==
Year	Category	Work	Outcome	Ref.
2011	Best Single	"One"	Nominated	
2011	Best Debut Album	Until One	Nominated	
2011	Best International Success	—	Nominated	
2011	Best Urban/Dance Album	Until One	Nominated	
2012	Best Artist	—	Nominated	
2012	Best Electronic/Dance Album	"Save the World"/"Antidote"	Nominated	
2012	Best Single	"Save the World"	Nominated	
2012	Best International Success	—	Won	
2013	Best Artist	—	Nominated	
2013	Best Electronic/Dance Album	Until Now	Won	
2013	Best Composers	—	Nominated	
2013	Best Single	"Don't You Worry Child"	Nominated	

== Grammy Awards ==
Year	Category	Work	Outcome	Ref.
2012	Best Dance Recording	"Save the World"	Nominated	
2013	Best Dance Recording	"Don't You Worry Child"	Nominated	

== International Dance Music Awards ==
Year	Category	Work	Outcome	Ref.
2010	Best House/Garage Track	"Leave the World Behind"	Won	
2010	Best Electro/Tech House Track	"Leave the World Behind"	Nominated	
2011	Best Electro/Tech House Track	"One (Your Name)"	Won	
2011	Best Progressive Track	"One (Your Name)"	Won	
2011	Best Global DJs	—	Nominated	
2011	Best Producer	—	Nominated	
2011	Best Music Video	"One (Your Name)"	Nominated	
2011	Best Breakthrough Group	—	Won	
2011	Best Group	—	Won	
2012	Best Electro/Tech House Track	"Save the World"	Nominated	
2012	Best Progressive Track	"Save the World"	Nominated	
2012	Best Global DJs	—	Nominated	
2012	Best Producer	—	Nominated	
2012	Best Music Video	"Save the World"	Won	
2012	Best Group	—	Won	
2013	Best Electro/Tech House Track	"Don't You Worry Child"	Won	
2013	Best European DJs	—	Nominated	
2013	Best Global DJs	—	Nominated	
2013	Best Producer	—	Nominated	
2013	Best Music Video	"Don't You Worry Child"	Won	
2013	Best Group	—	Won	

== MTVs European Music Awards ==
Year	Category	Work	Outcome	Ref.
2010	Best Swedish Act	—	Won	
2011	Best Swedish Act	—	Won	
2012	Best Electronic	—	Nominated	

== Teen Choice Awards ==
Year	Category	Work	Outcome	Ref.
2013	Choice Music: EDM Artist	—	Nominated	

== YouTube Creator Awards ==
- Swedish House Mafia
  (2.19 million subscribers - May 2020)
