= MTV Europe Music Award for Best Spanish Act =

Category of MTV Europe Music Awards

The following is a list of the MTV Europe Music Award winners and nominees for Best Spanish Act.

== Winners and nominees ==
Winners are listed first and highlighted in bold.

† indicates the Wildcard–winning artist.

=== 2000s ===
Year	Artist	Ref
2000
2000	**Dover**	
2000	Enrique Iglesias	
2000	M-Clan	
2000	Mónica Naranjo	
2000	OBK	
2001
2001	**La Oreja de Van Gogh**	
2001	Jarabe de Palo	
2001	Los Piratas	
2001	Najwa	
2001	Alejandro Sanz	
2002
2002	**Amaral**	
2002	Enrique Bunbury	
2002	El Canto del Loco	
2002	Enrique Iglesias	
2002	Sôber	
2003
2003	**El Canto del Loco**	
2003	Jarabe de Palo	
2003	Las Niñas	
2003	La Oreja de Van Gogh	
2003	Alejandro Sanz	
2004
2004	**Enrique Bunbury**	
2004	Bebe	
2004	David Bisbal	
2004	Estopa	
2004	Álex Ubago	
2005
2005	**El Canto del Loco**	
2005	Amaral	
2005	El Sueño de Morfeo	
2005	Melendi	
2005	Pereza	
2006
2006	**La Excepción**	
2006	Nena Daconte	
2006	La Oreja de Van Gogh	
2006	Macaco	
2006	Pereza	
2007
2007	**Violadores del Verso**	
2007	Dover	
2007	El Sueño de Morfeo	
2007	La Quinta Estación	
2007	La Mala Rodríguez	
2008
2008	**Amaral**	
2008	Pereza	
2008	Porta	
2008	Pignoise	
2008	La Casa Azul	
2009
2009	**We Are Standard**	
2009	Fangoria	
2009	Macaco	
2009	Nena Daconte	
2009	Russian Red	

=== 2010s ===
Year	Artist	Ref
2010
2010	**Enrique Iglesias**	
2010	Lori Meyers	
2010	La Mala Rodríguez	
2010	Najwa	
2010	SFDK	
2011
2011	**Russian Red**	
2011	El Pescao	
2011	Nach	
2011	Vetusta Morla	
2011	Zenttric	
2012
2012	**The Zombie Kids**	
2012	Corizonas	
2012	Iván Ferreiro	
2012	Love of Lesbian	
2012	Supersubmarina	
2013
2013	**Auryn**	
2013	Pablo Alborán	
2013	Anni B Sweet	
2013	Fangoria	
2013	Lori Meyers	
2014
2014	**Enrique Iglesias**	
2014	Leiva	
2014	Sweet California	
2014	Vinila Von Bismark	
2014	Izal †	
2014	Wildcard nominations: Triangulo de Amor Bizarro; Polock; Vetusta Morla	
2015
2015	**Sweet California**	
2015	Alejandro Sanz	
2015	Leiva	
2015	Neuman	
2015	Rayden †	
2015	Wildcard nominations: Vetusta Morla; Sexy Zebras; Hinds; La Bien Querida	
2016
2016	**Enrique Bunbury**	
2016	Álvaro Soler	
2016	Amaral	
2016	Corizonas	
2016	Leiva	
2017
2017	**Miguel Bosé**	
2017	C. Tangana	
2017	Kase.O	
2017	Lori Meyers	
2017	Viva Suecia	
2018
2018	**Viva Suecia**	
2018	Belako	
2018	Brisa Fenoy	
2018	Love of Lesbian	
2018	Rosalía	
2019
2019	**Lola Índigo**	
2019	Amaral	
2019	Anni B Sweet	
2019	Beret	
2019	Carolina Durante	

=== 2020s ===
Year	Artist	Ref
2020
2020	**La La Love You**	
2020	Aitana	
2020	Carolina Durante	
2020	Don Patricio	
2020	Leiva	
2021
2021	**Aitana**	
2021	Ana Mena	
2021	C. Tangana	
2021	Colectivo Da Silva	
2021	Pablo Alborán	
2022
2022	**Bad Gyal**	
2022	Dani Fernández	
2022	Fito & Fitipaldis	
2022	Quevedo	
2022	Rosalía	
2023
2023	**Samantha Hudson**	
2023	Abraham Mateo	
2023	Álvaro de Luna	
2023	Lola Índigo	
2023	Quevedo	
2024
2024	**Lola Índigo**	
2024	Ana Mena	
2024	Belén Aguilera	
2024	Dani Fernández	
2024	Mikel Izal	

== See also ==
- Telehit Awards
- LOS40 Music Awards
