= MTV Europe Music Award for Best Belgian Act =

Category of MTV Europe Music Awards

The following is a list of the MTV Europe Music Award winners and nominees for Best Belgian Act.

== Winners and nominees ==
Winners are listed first and highlighted in bold.

=== 1990s ===
| Year | Artist | Ref |
|---|---|---|
| 1994 | **Deus ^{[a]}** | |

=== 2010s ===
| Year | Artist | Ref |
|---|---|---|
2011
| 2011 | **Deus** | |
| 2011 | Goose | |
| 2011 | Stromae | |
| 2011 | The Subs | |
| 2011 | Triggerfinger | |
2012
| 2012 | **Milow** | |
| 2012 | Deus | |
| 2012 | Netsky | |
| 2012 | Selah Sue | |
| 2012 | Triggerfinger | |
2013
| 2013 | **Stromae** | |
| 2013 | Lazy Jay | |
| 2013 | Netsky | |
| 2013 | Ozark Henry | |
| 2013 | Trixie Whitley | |
2014
| 2014 | **Dimitri Vegas & Like Mike** | |
| 2014 | Stromae | |
| 2014 | Netsky | |
| 2014 | Triggerfinger | |
| 2014 | The Oddword | |
| 2014 | Pre-nominations: Hooverphonic; Milow; The Magician; Dr. Lektroluv | |
2015
| 2015 | **Dimitri Vegas & Like Mike** | |
| 2015 | Selah Sue | |
| 2015 | Lost Frequencies | |
| 2015 | Netsky | |
| 2015 | Oscar & The Wolf | |
2016
| 2016 | **Emma Bale** | |
| 2016 | Lost Frequencies | |
| 2016 | Laura Tesoro | |
| 2016 | Woodie Smalls | |
| 2016 | Tourist LeMC | |
2017
| 2017 | **Loïc Nottet** | |
| 2017 | Bazart | |
| 2017 | Coely | |
| 2017 | Lost Frequencies | |
| 2017 | Oscar & The Wolf | |
2018
| 2018 | **Dimitri Vegas & Like Mike** | |
| 2018 | Angèle | |
| 2018 | DVTCH NORRIS | |
| 2018 | Emma Bale | |
| 2018 | Warholla | |
2019
| 2019 | **MATTN** | |
| 2019 | Blackwave. | |
| 2019 | IBE | |
| 2019 | Tamino | |
| 2019 | Zwangere Guy | |

=== 2020s ===
| Year | Artist | Ref |
|---|---|---|
2020
| 2020 | **Angèle** | |
| 2020 | IBE | |
| 2020 | Blackwave. | |
| 2020 | OT | |
| 2020 | Lost Frequencies | |

^{^[a]}Local Hero Award

== See also ==
- MTV Europe Music Award for Best Dutch & Belgian Act
- TMF Awards (Belgium)
