= MTV Europe Music Award for Best Norwegian Act =

Category of MTV Europe Music Awards

The following is a list of the MTV Europe Music Award winners and nominees for Best Norwegian Act.

== 1990s ==
Year	Winner	Other nominees
1999	see MTV EMA for Best Nordic Act	

== 2000s ==
Year	Winner	Other nominees
2000	see MTV EMA for Best Nordic Act	
2001	see MTV EMA for Best Nordic Act	
2002	see MTV EMA for Best Nordic Act	
2003	see MTV EMA for Best Nordic Act	
2004	see MTV EMA for Best Nordic Act	
2005	Turbonegro	Ane Brun; Thomas Dybdahl; Marion Raven; Röyksopp
2006	Marit Larsen	Amulet; Mira Craig; Serena Maneesh; Elvira Nikolaisen
2007	El Axel	Karpe Diem; Lilyjets; Pleasure; Aleksander With
2008	Erik og Kriss	Ida Maria; Kakkmaddafakka; Karpe Diem; Madcon
2009	Yoga Fire	Donkeyboy; Maria Mena; Paperboys; Röyksopp

== 2010s ==
Year	Winner	Nominees	Pre-nomination
2010	Karpe Diem	Lars Vaular; Casiokids; Susanne Sundfør; Tommy Tee	
2011	Eva & The Heartmaker	Erik og Kriss; Jaa9 & OnklP; Jarle Bernhoft; Madcon	
2012	Erik & Kriss	Donkeyboy; Madcon; Karpe Diem; Sirkus Eliassen	
2013	Admiral P	Envy; Madcon; Maria Mena; Truls	
2014	Adelén	Nico & Vinz; Martin Tungevaag; Anders Nilsen; Donkeyboy	Katastrofe; Röyksopp; Admiral P; Broiler; Donkeyboy; Gabrielle
2015	Astrid S	Donkeyboy; Kygo; Madcon; Sandra Lyng	
2016	Alan Walker	Astrid S; Aurora; Julie Bergan; Kygo	
2017	Alan Walker	Astrid S; Gabrielle; Kygo; Seeb	
2018	Alan Walker	Astrid S; Kygo; Sigrid; Tungevaag & Raaban	
2019	Sigrid	Alan Walker; Astrid S; Kygo; Ruben	

== New Sounds of Europe ==
Norwegian competition

Year	Winner	Nominees
2007	Aleksander With	120 Days; Christel Alsos; Margaret Berger; My Midnight Creeps; Susanne Sundfør

== See also ==
- MTV Europe Music Award for Best Nordic Act
