= MTV Europe Music Award for Best Worldwide Act =

Category of MTV Europe Music Awards

The following is a list of the MTV Europe Music Award winners and nominees for Best Worldwide Act.

== 2010's ==
Year	Winner	Nominees
2011	Big Bang	Abdelfattah Grini; Lena; Restart; Britney Spears
2012	Han Geng	Ahmed Soultan; Dima Bilan; Rihanna; Restart; Super Junior
2013	Chris Lee	Cody Simpson; Fresno; Justin Bieber; Lena; Marco Mengoni; Ahmed Soultan; Bednarek; Exo; One Direction
2014	Bibi Zhou	Mohammed Assaf; 5 Seconds of Summer; Revolverheld; Dawid Kwiatkowski; One Direction; Alessandra Amoroso; B.A.P.; Dulce Maria; Fifth Harmony
2015	Diamond Platnumz (Africa & India); Jane Zhang (Asia); 5 Seconds of Summer (Australia & New Zealand); Marco Mengoni (Europe); Anitta (Brazil); Justin Bieber (North America)	
2016	Wizkid (Nigeria); Got7 (Korea); Troye Sivan (Australia); Zara Larsson (Sweden); Maluma (Colombia); Shawn Mendes (Canada)	
2017	Lil' Kleine - The Netherlands; C. Tangana – Spain; Babymetal – Japan; ALMA – Finland; Davido – Nigeria; Stormzy - UK & Ireland; Lali - Argentina	
