= MTV Europe Music Award for Best Japanese Act =

Category of MTV Europe Music Awards

The following is a list of the MTV Europe Music Award winners and nominees for Best Japanese Act.

== Winners and nominees ==
Winners are listed first and highlighted in bold.

=== 2010s ===
| Year | Artist | Ref |
|---|---|---|
2013
| 2013 | **Momoiro Clover Z** | |
| 2013 | Exile | |
| 2013 | Kyary Pamyu Pamyu | |
| 2013 | Miyavi | |
| 2013 | One Ok Rock | |
2014
| 2014 | **Daichi Miura** | |
| 2014 | One Ok Rock | |
| 2014 | E-girls | |
| 2014 | Perfume | |
| 2014 | Namie Amuro | |
| 2014 | Pre-nominations: Babymetal; Sekai no Owari; Man with a Mission; Kyary Pamyu Pamyu | |
2015
| 2015 | **Dempagumi.inc** | |
| 2015 | Babymetal | |
| 2015 | Sandaime J Soul Brothers | |
| 2015 | One Ok Rock | |
| 2015 | Sekai no Owari | |
| 2015 | Pre-nominations: AK-69; Alexandros; Crossfaith; Gesu no Kiwami Otome | |
2016
| 2016 | **One Ok Rock** | |
| 2016 | Kyary Pamyu Pamyu | |
| 2016 | Perfume | |
| 2016 | Radwimps | |
| 2016 | Ringo Sheena | |
2017
| 2017 | **Babymetal** | |
| 2017 | Kohh | |
| 2017 | Kyary Pamyu Pamyu | |
| 2017 | Rekishi | |
| 2017 | Wednesday Campanella | |
2018
| 2018 | **Little Glee Monster** | |
| 2018 | Daoko | |
| 2018 | Glim Spanky | |
| 2018 | Wednesday Campanella | |
| 2018 | Yahyel | |
2019
| 2019 | **King Gnu** | |
| 2019 | Nulbarich | |
| 2019 | Chai | |
| 2019 | Tempalay | |
| 2019 | Chanmina | |

=== 2020s ===
| Year | Artist | Ref |
|---|---|---|
2020
| 2020 | **Official Hige Dandism** | |
| 2020 | Hiraidai | |
| 2020 | Punpee | |
| 2020 | Rei | |
| 2020 | Yorushika | |
2021
| 2021 | **Sakurazaka46** | |
| 2021 | Awesome City Club | |
| 2021 | Eve | |
| 2021 | STUTS | |
| 2021 | Vaundy | |

== See also ==
- MTV Video Music Awards Japan
