= MTV Europe Music Award for Best Korean Act =

Category of MTV Europe Music Awards

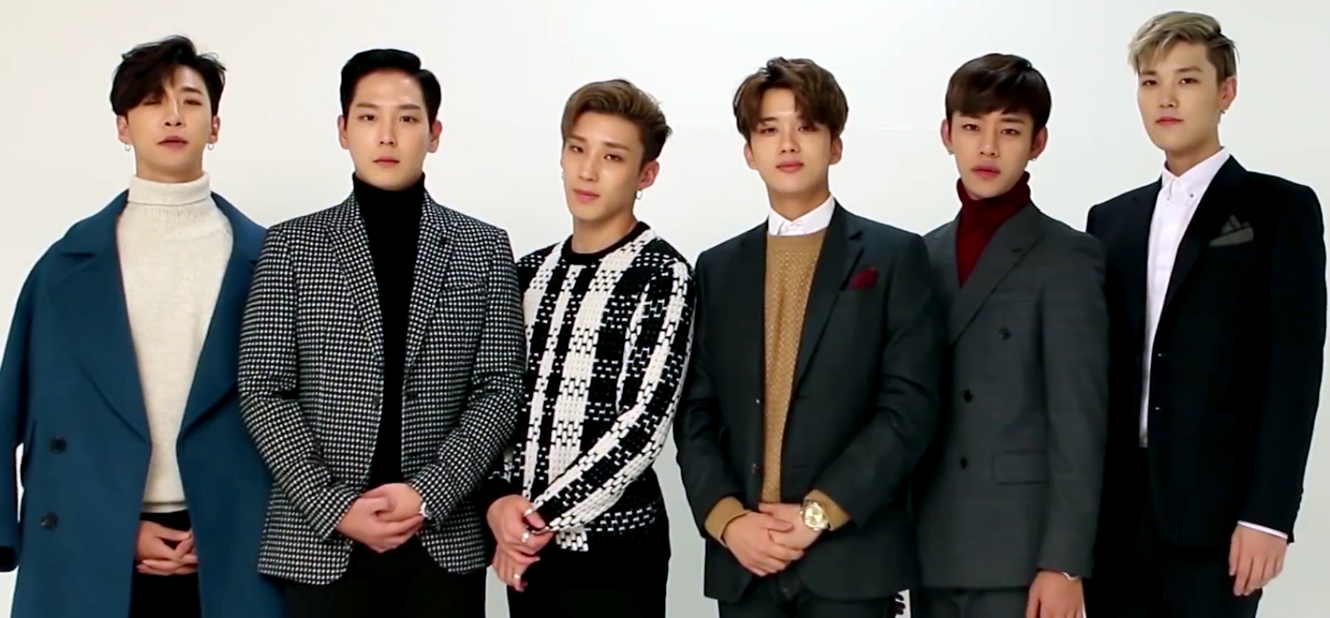
2016 Winners

The following is a list of the MTV Europe Music Award winners and nominees for Best Korean Act.

== Winners and nominees ==
Winners are listed first and highlighted in bold.

=== 2010s ===
Year	Artist	Ref
2013
2013	**Exo**	
2013	B.A.P	
2013	Boyfriend	
2013	Sistar	
2013	U-KISS	
2014
2014	**B.A.P**	
2014	Beast	
2014	BTS	
2014	CNBLUE	
2014	Kara	
2014	Pre-nominations: Topp Dogg; Boys Republic	
2015
2015	**BTS**	
2015	B1A4	
2015	GFriend	
2015	Got7	
2015	VIXX	
2016
2016	**B.A.P**	
2016	GFriend	
2016	Got7	
2016	Twice	
2016	VIXX	
2017
2017	**GFriend**	
2017	Mamamoo	
2017	Highlight	
2017	Seventeen	
2017	Wanna One	
2018
2018	**Loona**	
2018	Cosmic Girls	
2018	(G)I-dle	
2018	Golden Child	
2018	Pentagon	
2019
2019	**Ateez**	
2019	AB6IX	
2019	CIX	
2019	Itzy	
2019	Iz*One	

=== 2020s ===
Year	Artist	Ref
2020
2020	**Stray Kids**	
2020	Astro	
2020	KARD	
2020	Victon	
2020	Everglow	
2021
2021	**Aespa**	
2021	Cravity	
2021	STAYC	
2021	Weeekly	
2021	WEi	
