= MTV Europe Music Award for Best Australian Act =

Category of MTV Europe Music Awards

The following is a list of the MTV Europe Music Award winners and nominees for Best Australia Act.

== Winners and nominees ==
Winners are listed first and highlighted in bold.

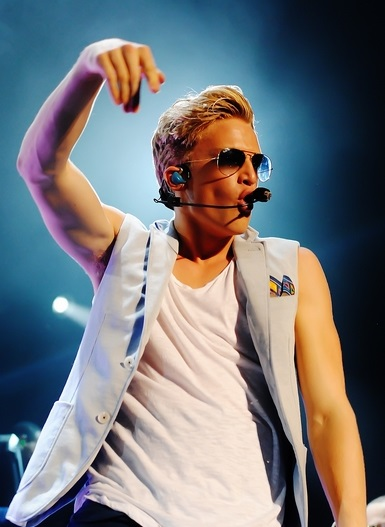
Inaugural recipient Cody Simpson

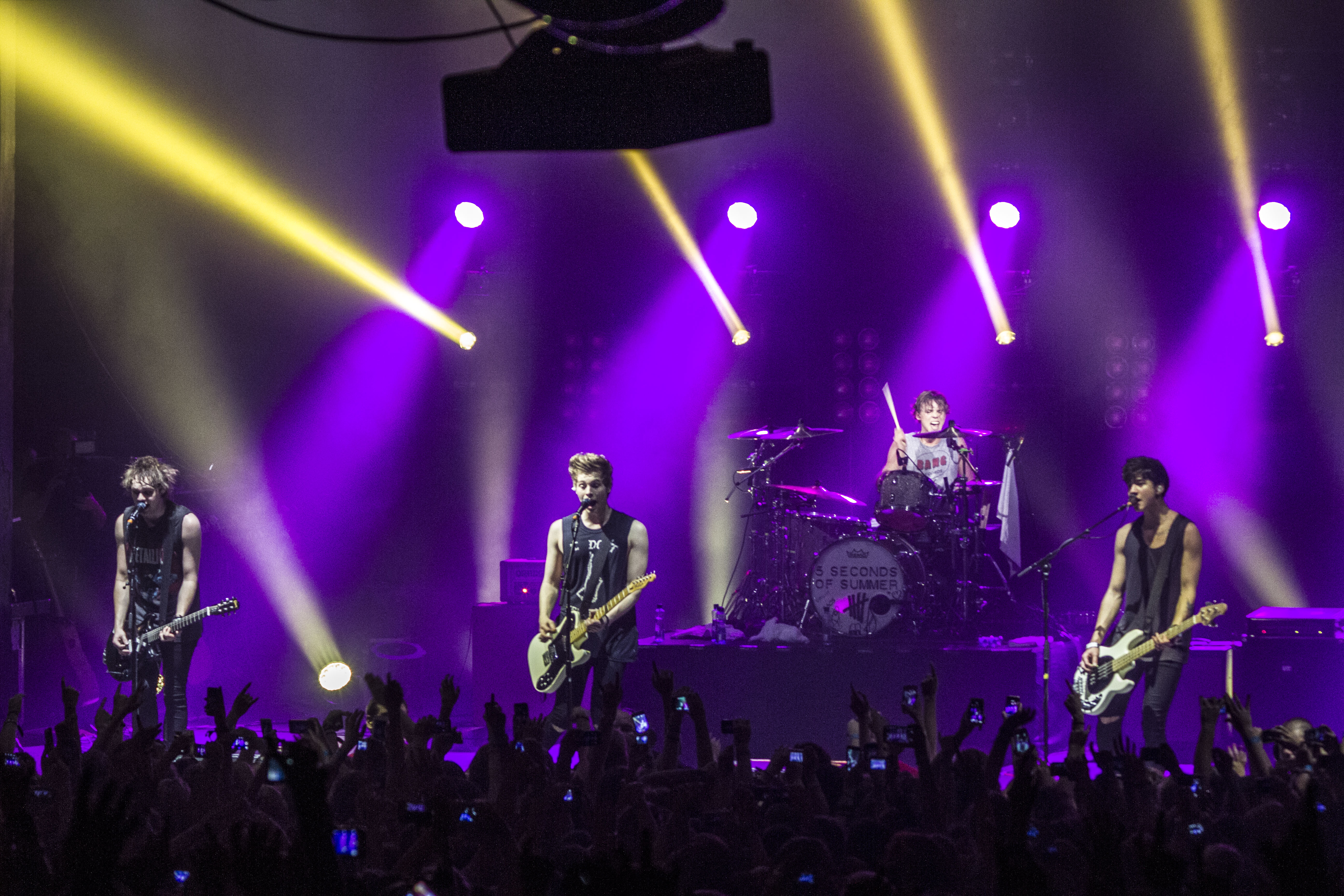
5 Seconds of Summer are the most successful act in this category, with two

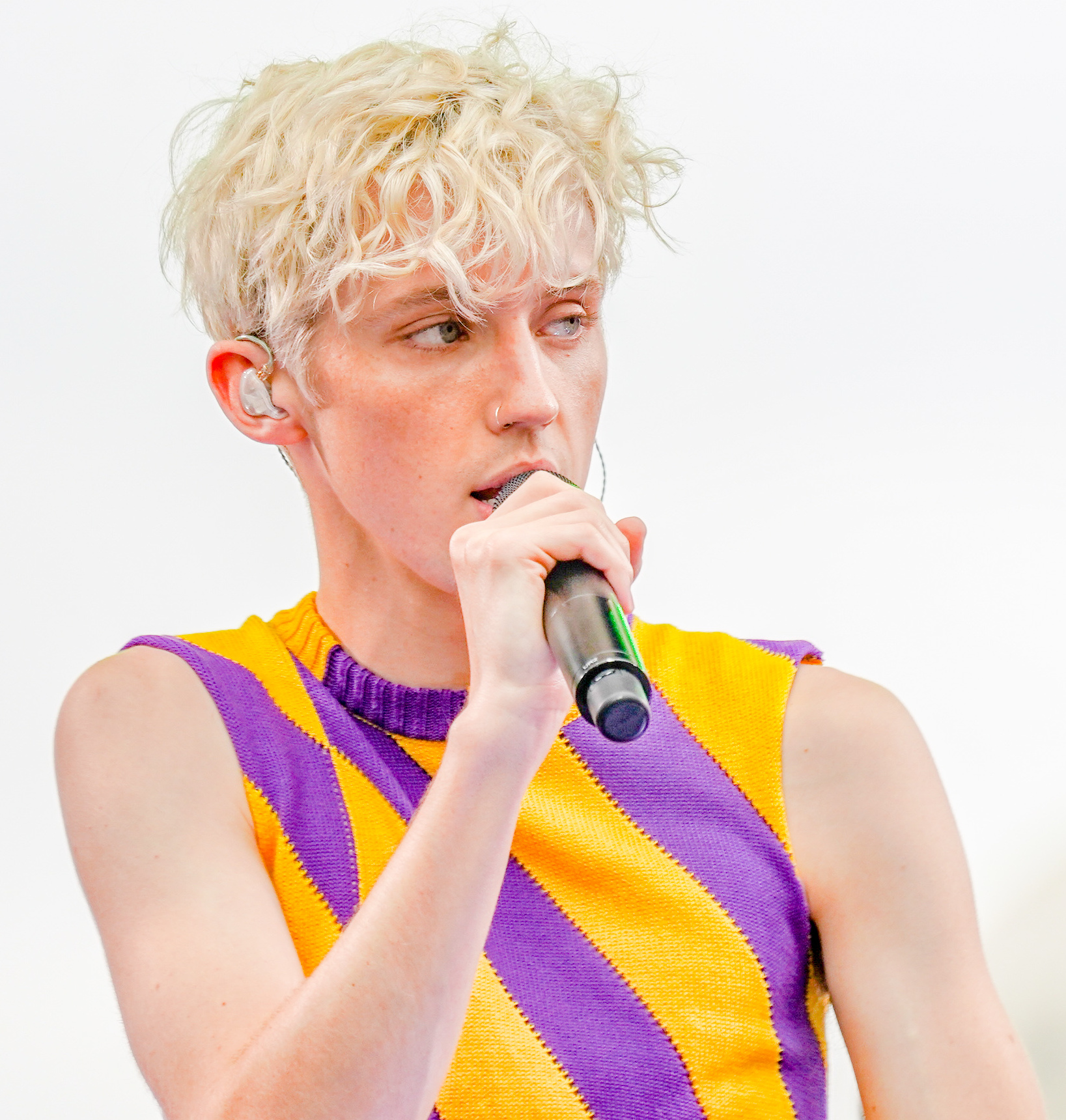
Troye Sivan won the award in 2016

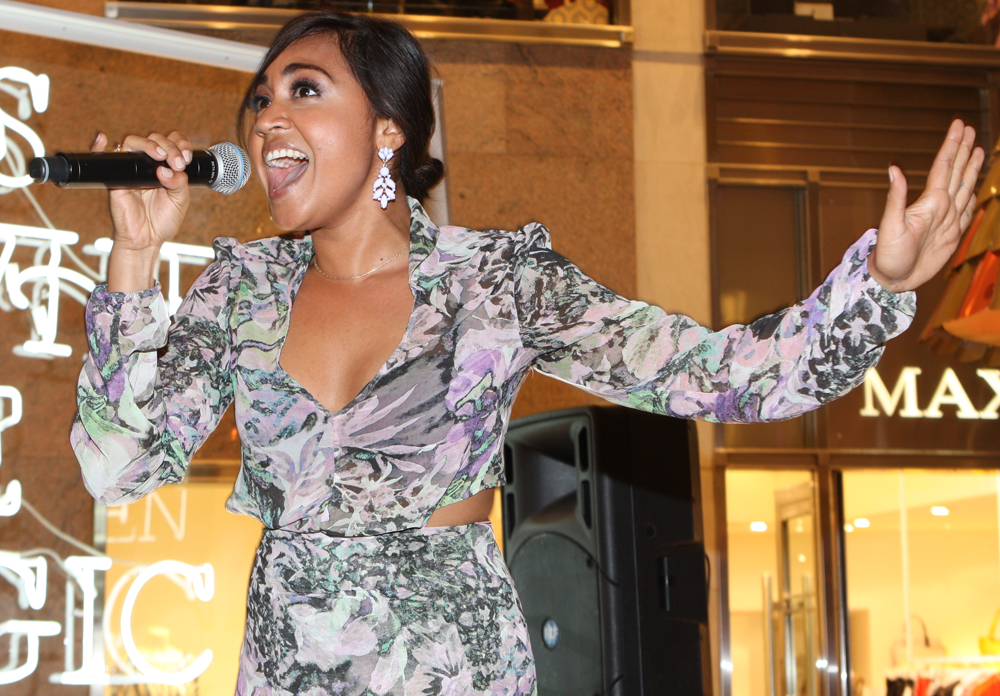
2017 honouree Jessica Mauboy is the first female winner

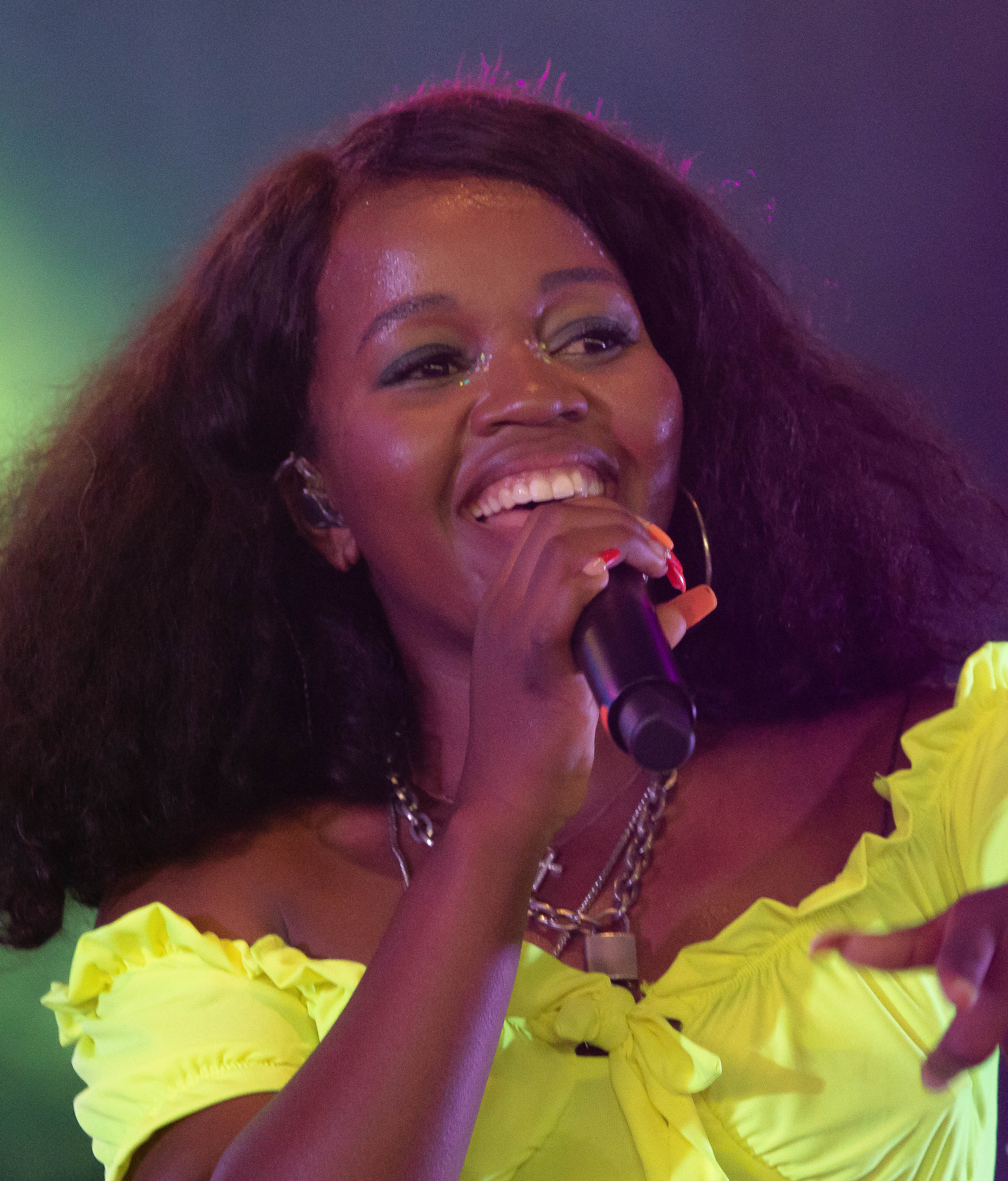
2018 recipient Tkay Maidza

=== 2010s ===
Year	Artist	Ref
2013
2013	**Cody Simpson**	
2013	Empire of the Sun	
2013	Flume	
2013	Iggy Azalea	
2013	Timomatic	
2014
2014	**5 Seconds of Summer**	
2014	Iggy Azalea	
2014	Sia	
2014	Justice Crew	
2014	Havana Brown	
2014	Pre-nominations: Sheppard; Jessica Mauboy; 360; Ill	
2015
2015	**5 Seconds of Summer**	
2015	Guy Sebastian	
2015	Peking Duk	
2015	Sia	
2015	Vance Joy	
2016
2016	**Troye Sivan**	
2016	Flume	
2016	Tkay Maidza	
2016	The Veronicas	
2016	Vance Joy	
2017
2017	**Jessica Mauboy**	
2017	Pnau	
2017	Illy	
2017	Meg Mac	
2017	Vera Blue	
2018
2018	**Tkay Maidza**	
2018	Amy Shark	
2018	Dean Lewis	
2018	Peking Duk	
2018	The Rubens	
2019
2019	**Ruel**	
2019	Dean Lewis	
2019	Mallrat	
2019	Sampa the Great	
2019	Tones and I	

=== 2020s ===
Year	Artist	Ref
2020
2020	**G Flip**	
2020	Baker Boy	
2020	Hayden James	
2020	The Kid Laroi	
2020	Tones and I	
2021
2021	**Ruel**	
2021	Amy Shark	
2021	Masked Wolf	
2021	The Kid Laroi	
2021	Tones and I	
2022
2022	**G Flip**	
2022	Genesis Owusu	
2022	Ruel	
2022	The Kid Laroi	
2022	Vance Joy	
2023
2023	**Kylie Minogue**	
2023	Budjerah	
2023	G Flip	
2023	The Kid Laroi	
2023	Troye Sivan	
2024
2024	**Sia**	
2024	Confidence Man	
2024	CYRIL	
2024	Kylie Minogue	
2024	The Kid Laroi	
2024	Troye Sivan	

== See also ==
- MTV VMA International Viewer's Choice Award for MTV Australia
- MTV Australia Awards
