= MTV Europe Music Award for Best Dutch & Belgian Act =

Category of MTV Europe Music Awards

The following is a list of the MTV Europe Music Award winners and nominees for Best Dutch & Belgian Act.

| Year | Winner | Nominees |
|---|---|---|
| 2004 | Kane | Novastar; The Sheer; Soulwax; Tiësto |
| 2005 | Anouk | Kane; Gabriel Ríos; Soulwax; Within Temptation |
| 2006 | Anouk | dEUS; Kane; Pete Philly & Perquisite; Gabriel Ríos |
| 2007 | Within Temptation | Goose; Opgezwolle; Gabriel Ríos; Tiësto |
| 2008 | De Jeugd van Tegenwoordig | Alain Clark; Kraak & Smaak; Pete Philly & Perquisite; Room Eleven |
| 2009 | Esmée Denters | The Black Box Revelation; Alain Clark; Fedde le Grand; Milow |
| 2010 | Caro Emerald | The Opposites; Stromae; The Van Jets; Waylon |

== See also ==
- MTV Europe Music Award for Best Dutch Act
- MTV Europe Music Award for Best Belgian Act
