= MTV Europe Music Award for Best Nordic Act =

Category of MTV Europe Music Awards

The following is a list of the MTV Europe Music Award winners and nominees for Best Nordic Act.

== Winners and nominees ==
=== 1990s ===
Year	Artist	Nationality	Ref
1998
1998	Eagle Eye Cherry^{[a]}	Sweden	
1998	Aqua	Denmark	
1998	Cue	Sweden	
1998	Drömhus	Sweden	
1998	Robyn	Sweden	
1999
1999	Lene Marlin	Norway	
1999	Jennifer Brown	Sweden	
1999	The Cardigans	Sweden	
1999	Andreas Johnson	Sweden	
1999	Petter	Sweden	

=== 2000s ===
Year	Artist	Nationality	Ref
2000
2000	Bomfunk MCs	Finland	
2000	The Ark	Sweden	
2000	Darude	Finland	
2000	Shimoli	Sweden	
2000	Thomas Rusiak	Sweden	
2001
2001	Safri Duo	Denmark	
2001	Briskeby	Norway	
2001	Emmi	Finland	
2001	Eskobar	Sweden	
2001	Titiyo	Sweden	
2002
2002	Kent	Sweden	
2002	The Crash	Finland	
2002	The Hives	Sweden	
2002	Röyksopp	Norway	
2002	Saybia	Denmark	
2003
2003	The Rasmus	Finland	
2003	The Cardigans	Sweden	
2003	Junior Senior	Denmark	
2003	Kashmir	Denmark	
2003	Outlandish	Denmark	
2004
2004	The Hives	Sweden	
2004	Sondre Lerche	Norway	
2004	Maria Mena	Norway	
2004	Sahara Hotnights	Sweden	
2004	Saybia	Denmark	

=== 2020s ===
Year	Artist	Nationality	Ref
2020
2020	Zara Larsson	Sweden	
2020	Branco	Denmark	
2020	Gilli	Denmark	
2020	Alma	Finland	
2020	Kygo	Norway	
2021
2021	Tessa	Denmark	
2021	Drew Sycamore	Denmark	
2021	Sigrid	Norway	
2021	Swedish House Mafia	Sweden	
2021	Zara Larsson	Sweden	
2022
2022	Sigrid	Norway	
2022	Kygo	Norway	
2022	MØ	Denmark	
2022	Swedish House Mafia	Sweden	
2022	Tove Lo	Sweden	
2023
2023	Käärijä	Finland	
2023	Alessandra	Norway	
2023	Loreen	Sweden	
2023	Swedish House Mafia	Sweden	
2023	Zara Larsson	Sweden	
2024
2024	Zara Larsson	Sweden	
2024	Alesso	Sweden	
2024	Girl in Red	Norway	
2024	Laufey	Iceland	
2024	Swedish House Mafia	Sweden	

^{^[a]}MTV Select — Northern

The award has been replaced from 2005 to 2019 by:

- MTV Europe Music Award for Best Danish Act
- MTV Europe Music Award for Best Finnish Act
- MTV Europe Music Award for Best Norwegian Act
- MTV Europe Music Award for Best Swedish Act
