= Mimiks =

Swiss singer (born 1991)

- Born: Angel Egli; 1991 December 17; Lucerne, Switzerland
- Genres: Pop; hip hop
- Occupations: Singer; rapper
- Years active: 2009–present

Angel Egli, better known as Mimiks, is a Swiss singer and rapper with Spanish roots. He has won MTV Europe Music Awards for best Swiss act.
