= 2017 MTV Europe Music Awards =

Music award

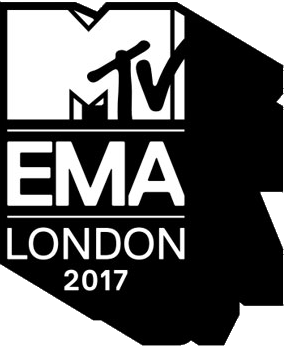
- Date: 12 November 2017
- Location: Wembley Arena, London, United Kingdom
- Hosted by: Rita Ora
- Most wins: Shawn Mendes (4)
- Most nominations: Taylor Swift (6)
- Website: mtvema.com

Television/radio coverage
- Network: MTV; Channel 5
- Directed by: Hamish Hamilton

The 2017 MTV EMAs (also known as the MTV Europe Music Awards) were held at The SSE Arena in Wembley, London, United Kingdom, on 12 November 2017. The ceremony's host was Rita Ora, with voiceovers provided by Capital FM DJ Roman Kemp. This was the sixth time that the UK hosted the ceremony, and the second time London was the host city. London first hosted the ceremony in 1996 at Alexandra Palace. The ceremony was directed for television by British award-winning multi camera director Hamish Hamilton.

Taylor Swift was nominated for six awards followed by Shawn Mendes who was nominated for five. Mendes won four awards becoming the most awarded artist of the night.

== Nominations ==
Winners are in bold text.

Best Song	Best Video
**Shawn Mendes — "There's Nothing Holdin' Me Back"**: Clean Bandit (featuring Sean Paul and Anne-Marie) — "Rockabye"; DJ Khaled (featuring Rihanna and Bryson Tiller) — "Wild Thoughts"; Ed Sheeran — "Shape of You"; Luis Fonsi (featuring Daddy Yankee and Justin Bieber) — "Despacito (remix)"	**Kendrick Lamar — "Humble"**: Foo Fighters — "Run"; Katy Perry (featuring Migos) — "Bon Appétit"; Kyle (featuring Lil Yachty) — "iSpy"; Taylor Swift — "Look What You Made Me Do"
Best Artist	Best New
**Shawn Mendes**: Ariana Grande; Ed Sheeran; Kendrick Lamar; Miley Cyrus; Taylor Swift	**Dua Lipa**: Julia Michaels; Khalid; Kyle; Rag'n'Bone Man
Best Pop	Best Electronic
**Camila Cabello**: Demi Lovato; Miley Cyrus; Shawn Mendes; Taylor Swift	**David Guetta**: Calvin Harris; Major Lazer; Martin Garrix; The Chainsmokers
Best Rock	Best Alternative
**Coldplay**: Foo Fighters; Royal Blood; The Killers; U2	**Thirty Seconds to Mars**: Imagine Dragons; Lana Del Rey; Lorde; The xx
Best Hip-Hop	Best Live
**Eminem**: Drake; Future; Kendrick Lamar; Post Malone	**Ed Sheeran**: Bruno Mars; Coldplay; Eminem; U2
Best World Stage	Best Push
**The Chainsmokers**: DNCE; Foo Fighters; Kings of Leon; Steve Aoki; Tomorrowland 2017	**Hailee Steinfeld**: Jon Bellion; Julia Michaels; Kacy Hill; Khalid; Kyle; Noah Cyrus; Petite Meller; Rag'n'Bone Man; SZA; The Head and the Heart
Biggest Fans	Best Look
**Shawn Mendes**: Ariana Grande; Justin Bieber; Katy Perry; Taylor Swift	**Zayn Malik**: Dua Lipa; Harry Styles; Rita Ora; Taylor Swift
Best Worldwide Act	
**Alma**; **Babymetal**; **C. Tangana**; **Davido**; **Lali**; **Lil' Kleine**; **Stormzy**; **Nasty C**	
Power of Music Award
Artists for Grenfell: Stormzy; Robbie Williams; James Blunt; Rita Ora; Craig David; Dan Smith (of Bastille); Liam Payne; Emeli Sandé; Kelly Jones (of Stereophonics); Paloma Faith; Louis Tomlinson; Labrinth; Jorja Smith; WSTRN; Leona Lewis; Jessie J; James Arthur; Roger Daltrey (of The Who); Ella Eyre; Anne-Marie; Ella Henderson; Louisa Johnson; 5 After Midnight; Angel; Carl Barât (of The Libertines); Deno; Donae'o; Dua Lipa; Fleur East; Gareth Malone and The Choir for Grenfell; Geri Halliwell (of Spice Girls); Gregory Porter; Jessie Ware; John Newman; Jon McClure (of Reverend and the Makers); London Community Gospel Choir; Matt Goss; Matt Terry; Mr Eazi; Nathan Sykes; Omar; Pixie Lott; Ray BLK; Raye; Shakka; Shane Filan (of Westlife); Tom Grennan; Tony Hadley (of Spandau Ballet); Tulisa
Global Icon
**U2**

== Regional nominations ==
Winners are in bold text.

Europe
Best Adria Act	Best Belgian Act
**Nicim Izazvan**: Koala_Voice; Marin Jurić Čivro; Nina Kraljić; Sara Jo	**Loïc Nottet**: Bazart; Coely; Lost Frequencies; Oscar & The Wolf
Best Danish Act	Best Dutch Act
**Martin Jensen**: Christopher; Kesi; Lukas Graham; MØ	**Lil Kleine**: Boef; Chef'Special; Lucas & Steve; Roxeanne Hazes
Best Finnish Act	Best French Act
**Alma**: Evelina; Haloo Helsinki!; Mikael Gabriel; Robin	**Amir**: Soprano; MHD; Petit Biscuit; Feder
Best German Act	Best Hungarian Act
**Wincent Weiss**: Alle Farben; Cro; Mark Forster; Marteria	**Magdolna Rúzsa**: Freddie; Gabi Tóth; Joci Pápai; Kowalsky Meg A Vega
Best Israeli Act	Best Italian Act
**Noa Kirel**: Ania Bukstein; Nechi Nech; Static & Ben El; Stéphane Legar	**Ermal Meta**: Fabri Fibra; Francesco Gabbani; Thegiornalisti; Tiziano Ferro
Best Norwegian Act	Best Polish Act
**Alan Walker**: Astrid S; Gabrielle; Kygo; Seeb	**Dawid Kwiatkowski**: Bednarek; Margaret; Monika Lewczuk; Natalia Nykiel
Best Portuguese Act	Best Russian Act
**Salvador Sobral**: HMB; Mickael Carreira; Miguel Araújo; Virgul	**Ivan Dorn**: Elena Temnikova; Grebz; Yolka; Husky
Best Spanish Act	Best Swedish Act
**Miguel Bosé**: C. Tangana; Kase O; Lori Meyers; Viva Suecia	**Axwell and Ingrosso**: Galantis; Tove Lo; Vigiland; Zara Larsson
Best Swiss Act	Best UK & Ireland Act
**Mimiks**: Lo & Leduc; Pegasus; Xen; Züri West	**Louis Tomlinson**: Dua Lipa; Ed Sheeran; Little Mix; Stormzy
Africa
Best African Act
**Davido**: Babes Wodumo; C4 Pedro; Nyashinski; WizKid
Asia
Best Greater China Act	Best Indian Act
**Huo Zun**: Bii; He Jie; Pakho Chau; Wang Sulong	**Hard Kaur**: Yatharth; Nucleya; Parekh & Singh; Raja Kumari
Best Japanese Act	Best Korean Act
**Babymetal**: Kohh; Kyary Pamyu Pamyu; Rekishi; Wednesday Campanella	**GFriend**: Highlight; Mamamoo; Seventeen; Wanna One
Best Southeast Asian Act	
**James Reid**: Faizal Tahir; Dam Vinh Hung; Isyana Sarasvati; Slot Machine; The Sam Willows; Palitchoke Ayanaputra	
Australia and New Zealand
Best Australian Act	Best New Zealand Act
**Jessica Mauboy**: Pnau; Illy; Meg Mac; Vera Blue	**Tapz**: David Dallas; Lorde; Maala; Stan Walker
Americas
Best Brazilian Act	Best Canadian Act
**Anitta**: Alok; Karol Conká; Nego do Borel; Projota	**Shawn Mendes**: Alessia Cara; Drake; Justin Bieber; The Weeknd
Best Latin America North Act	Best Latin America Central Act
**Mon Laferte**: Café Tacuba; Caloncho; Natalia Lafourcade; Sofía Reyes	**J Balvin**: Maluma; Morat; Piso 21; Sebastián Yatra
Best Latin America South Act	Best US Act
**Lali**: Airbag; Carajo; Indios; Oriana	**Fifth Harmony**: DJ Khaled; Kendrick Lamar; Bruno Mars; Taylor Swift

== Performances ==
=== Pre show ===
Artist(s)	Song(s)
Pre-show
Stefflon Don	"Hurtin' Me"

=== Main Show ===
Artist	Featuring	Song
Eminem	Skylar Grey	"Walk on Water"
Liam Payne		"Strip That Down"
Camila Cabello		"Havana"
Demi Lovato		"Sorry Not Sorry" "Tell Me You Love Me"
Stormzy		"Big for Your Boots"
Rita Ora		"Your Song" "Anywhere"
Shawn Mendes		"There's Nothing Holdin' Me Back"
Clean Bandit	Zara Larsson; Julia Michaels; Anne-Marie	"Symphony" "I Miss You" "Rockabye"
U2		"Get Out of Your Own Way" (Filmed at Trafalgar Square)
French Montana	Swae Lee	"Unforgettable"
Travis Scott		"Butterfly Effect"
The Killers		"The Man"
Kesha		"Learn to Let Go"
David Guetta	Charli XCX; French Montana	"Dirty Sexy Money"

== Appearances ==
- Natalie Dormer and Paul Pogba — presented Best Song
- Prophets of Rage — presented Best Hip-Hop
- Skylar Grey and Hailey Baldwin — presented Best Video
- James Bay and Nathalie Emmanuel — presented Best Alternative
- Sabrina Carpenter and Daya — presented Best Pop
- Madison Beer and Dele Alli — presented Best Artist
- Jared Leto — presented Global Icon
- Rita Ora – presented a clip of George Michael's performance at the 1994 EMAs as an in memoriam segment, featuring Michael, Chris Cornell, Chester Bennington and Tom Petty

== See also ==
- 2017 MTV Video Music Awards
