= MTV Europe Music Award for Best Female =

Category of MTV Europe Music Awards

The MTV Europe Music Award for Best Female was one of the original general awards that has been handed out every year since the first annual MTV Europe Music Awards in 1994. In 2007 the award was renamed to Best Solo Artist rewarding the soloists of both sexes, in 2008 the award for Best Female was again eliminated from the EMAs, but it was revived again in 2009 with its original name. Lady Gaga is the biggest winner of the category with three awards.

== Winners and nominees ==
Winners are listed first and highlighted in bold.

† indicates an MTV Video Music Award for Best Female Video–winning artist.
‡ indicates an MTV Video Music Award for Best Female Video–nominated artist that same year.

=== 1990s ===
Year	Artist	Ref
1994
1994	**Mariah Carey**	
1994	Tori Amos	
1994	Björk ‡	
1994	Neneh Cherry	
1994	Marusha	
1995
1995	**Björk**	
1995	Sheryl Crow	
1995	PJ Harvey ‡	
1995	Janet Jackson	
1995	Madonna †	
1996
1996	**Alanis Morissette †**	
1996	Björk ‡	
1996	Toni Braxton	
1996	Neneh Cherry	
1996	Joan Osborne	
1997
1997	**Janet Jackson**	
1997	Björk	
1997	Toni Braxton ‡	
1997	Sheryl Crow	
1997	Madonna	
1998
1998	**Madonna †**	
1998	Mariah Carey ‡	
1998	Celine Dion	
1998	Natalie Imbruglia ‡	
1998	Janet Jackson	
1999
1999	**Britney Spears ‡**	
1999	Geri Halliwell	
1999	Lauryn Hill †	
1999	Whitney Houston	
1999	Madonna ‡	

=== 2000s ===
Year	Artist	Ref
2000
2000	**Madonna**	
2000	Melanie C	
2000	Janet Jackson	
2000	Jennifer Lopez	
2000	Britney Spears ‡	
2001
2001	**Jennifer Lopez ‡**	
2001	Mariah Carey	
2001	Dido ‡	
2001	Janet Jackson ‡	
2001	Madonna ‡	
2002
2002	**Jennifer Lopez**	
2002	Kylie Minogue	
2002	Pink †	
2002	Shakira ‡	
2002	Britney Spears ‡	
2003
2003	**Christina Aguilera ‡**	
2003	Beyoncé †	
2003	Madonna	
2003	Kylie Minogue	
2003	Pink	
2004
2004	**Britney Spears ‡**	
2004	Anastacia	
2004	Beyoncé †	
2004	Alicia Keys ‡	
2004	Avril Lavigne	
2005
2005	**Shakira ‡**	
2005	Mariah Carey ‡	
2005	Missy Elliott	
2005	Alicia Keys	
2005	Gwen Stefani ‡	
2006
2006	**Christina Aguilera ‡**	
2006	Beyoncé	
2006	Nelly Furtado ‡	
2006	Madonna ‡	
2006	Shakira ‡	
2007 – 2008	—N/a	
2009
2009	**Beyoncé ‡**	
2009	Katy Perry ‡	
2009	Lady Gaga ‡	
2009	Leona Lewis	
2009	Shakira	

=== 2010s ===
Year	Artist	Ref
2010
2010	**Lady Gaga †**	
2010	Miley Cyrus	
2010	Katy Perry ‡	
2010	Rihanna	
2010	Shakira	
2011
2011	**Lady Gaga †**	
2011	Adele ‡	
2011	Beyoncé ‡	
2011	Jennifer Lopez	
2011	Katy Perry ‡	
2012
2012	**Taylor Swift**	
2012	Katy Perry ‡	
2012	Nicki Minaj †	
2012	Pink	
2012	Rihanna ‡	
2013
2013	**Katy Perry**	—N/a
2013	Miley Cyrus ‡	—N/a
2013	Selena Gomez	—N/a
2013	Lady Gaga	—N/a
2013	Taylor Swift †	—N/a
2014		—N/a
2014	**Ariana Grande ‡**	
2014	Beyoncé ‡	
2014	Katy Perry †	
2014	Nicki Minaj	
2014	Taylor Swift	
2015
2015	**Rihanna**	
2015	Ellie Goulding ‡	
2015	Miley Cyrus	
2015	Nicki Minaj ‡	
2015	Taylor Swift †	
2016
2016	**Lady Gaga**	
2016	Adele ‡	
2016	Beyoncé †	
2016	Rihanna ‡	
2016	Sia ‡	

== Statistics ==
Number of European Nominations	Total Number
13	95

== See also ==
- MTV Video Music Award for Best Female Video
