= MTV Europe Music Award for Best Finnish Act =

Category of MTV Europe Music Awards

The following is a list of the MTV Europe Music Award winners and nominees for Best Finnish Act.

== 1990s ==
Year	Winner	Other nominees
1999	see MTV EMA for Best Nordic Act	

== 2000s ==
Year	Winner	Other nominees
2000	see MTV EMA for Best Nordic Act	
2001	see MTV EMA for Best Nordic Act	
2002	see MTV EMA for Best Nordic Act	
2003	see MTV EMA for Best Nordic Act	
2004	see MTV EMA for Best Nordic Act	
2005	The Rasmus	69 Eyes; Apocalyptica; HIM; Nightwish
2006	Poets of the Fall	Lordi; PMMP; Olavi Uusivirta; Von Hertzen Brothers
2007	Negative	HIM; Ari Koivunen; Nightwish; Sunrise Avenue
2008	Nightwish	Anna Abreu; Children Of Bodom; Disco Ensemble; HIM
2009	Deep Insight	Apulanta; Cheek; Disco Ensemble; Happoradio

== 2010s ==
Year	Winner	Other nominees	Pre-nomination
2010	Stam1na	Amorphis; Chisu; Fintelligens; Jenni Vartiainen	
2011	Lauri Ylönen	Anna Abreu; Children of Bodom; Haloo Helsinki!; Sunrise Avenue	
2012	Robin	Cheek; Chisu; Elokuu; PMMP	
2013	Isac Elliot	Anna Puu; Elokuu; Haloo Helsinki!; Mikael Gabriel	
2014	Isac Elliot	Kasmir; Nikke Ankara; Robin; Teflon Brothers	Mikael Gabriel; JVG; Diandra
2015	JVG	Antti Tuisku; Kasmir; Mikael Gabriel; Robin	
2016	Antti Tuisku	Evelina; Nikke Ankara; Teflon Brothers; Paula Vesala	
2017	Alma	Evelina; Haloo Helsinki!; Mikael Gabriel; Robin	
2018	JVG	Evelina; SANNI; Mikael Gabriel; Nikke Ankara	
2019	JVG	Alma; Benjamin; Gettomasa; Robin Packalen	

== See also ==
- MTV Europe Music Award for Best Nordic Act
