= MTV Europe Music Award for Best Dutch Act =

The following is a list of the MTV Europe Music Award winners and nominees for Best Dutch Act.

== Winners and nominees ==
Winners are listed first and highlighted in bold.

=== 1990s ===
Year	Artist	Ref
1994	**Van Dik Hout ^{[a]}**	

=== 2000s ===
Year	Artist	Ref
2000	**Kane**	
2000	Anouk	
2000	Bløf	
2000	Krezip	
2001
2001	**Kane**	
2001	Anouk	
2001	Bastian	
2001	Brainpower	
2001	Johan	
2002
2002	**Brainpower**	
2002	Di-Rect	
2002	Kane	
2002	Sita	
2002	Tiësto	
2003
2003	**Tiësto**	
2003	Beef	
2003	Bløf	
2003	Junkie XL	
2003	Kane	

=== 2010s ===
Year	Artist	Ref
2011	**Ben Saunders**	
2011	Afrojack	
2011	Baskervilles	
2011	De Jeugd van Tegenwoordig	
2011	Go Back to the Zoo	
2012	**Afrojack**	
2012	Chef'Special	
2012	Eva Simons	
2012	Gers Pardoel	
2012	Tiësto	
2013
2013	**Kensington**	
2013	Afrojack	
2013	Armin Van Buuren	
2013	Nicky Romero	
2013	Nielson	
2014
2014	**Kensington**	
2014	Chef'Special	
2014	Hardwell	
2014	Martin Garrix	
2014	Pre-nominations: Jett Rebel; Kraantje Pappie; Dotan; Mr. Probz; Yellow Claw	
2015
2015	**Kensington**	
2015	Dotan	
2015	Martin Garrix	
2015	Natalie La Rose	
2015	Oliver Heldens	
2016
2016	**Broederliefde**	
2016	Douwe Bob	
2016	Julian Jordan	
2016	Ronnie Flex	
2016	Sam Feldt	
2017
2017	**Lil' Kleine**	
2017	Boef	
2017	Chef'Special	
2017	Lucas & Steve	
2017	Roxeanne Hazes	
2018
2018	**Jack Shirak**	
2018	Maan	
2018	Naaz	
2018	Bizzey	
2018	Ronnie Flex	
2019
2019	**Snelle**	
2019	Josylvio	
2019	Maan	
2019	Nielson	
2019	Yung Felix	

=== 2020s ===
Year	Artist	Ref
2020	**Emma Heesters**	
2020	Davina Michelle	
2020	Tabitha	
2020	Bilal Wahib	
2020	Suzan & Freek	
2022	**Goldband**	
2022	Antoon	
2022	Frenna	
2022	Rondé	
2022	Yade Lauren	
2023	**Flemming**	
2023	Idaly	
2023	Kris Kross Amsterdam	
2023	S10	
2023	Zoë Tauran	
2024	**Roxy Dekker**	
2024	Claude	
2024	Jonna Fraser	
2024	Mr. Belt & Wezol	
2024	Son Mieux	

^{^[a]}Local Hero Award — Netherlands

== See also ==
- MTV Europe Music Award for Best Dutch & Belgian Act
