= MTV Europe Music Award for Best Brazilian Act =

Category of MTV Europe Music Awards

- Country: Europe
- Presented by: MTV
- First award: 2012
- Currently held by: Pabllo Vittar (2024)

Highlights
- Most wins: Anitta (5)
- Most nominations: Anitta (7)
- Website: ema.mtv.tv/

The following is a list of the MTV Europe Music Award winners and nominees for Best Brazilian Act.

== Winners and nominees ==
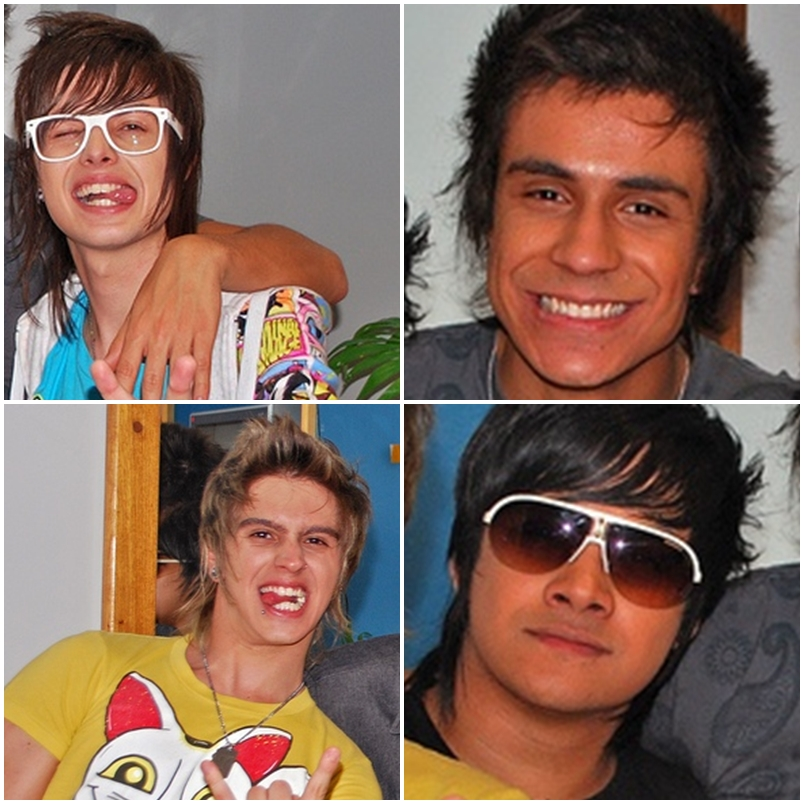
Restart was the first winner in this category in 2012.

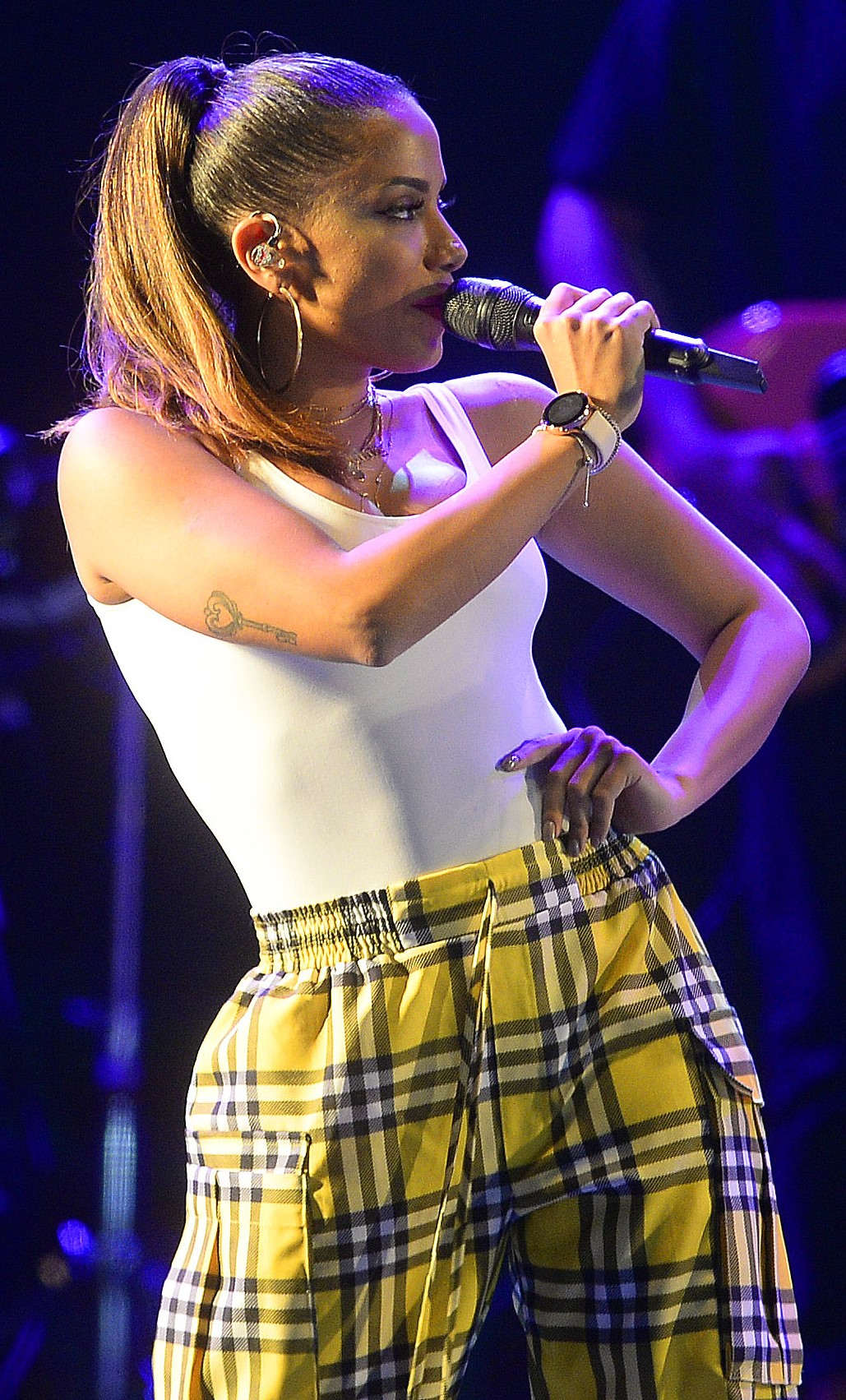
Anitta won the award five times in a row.

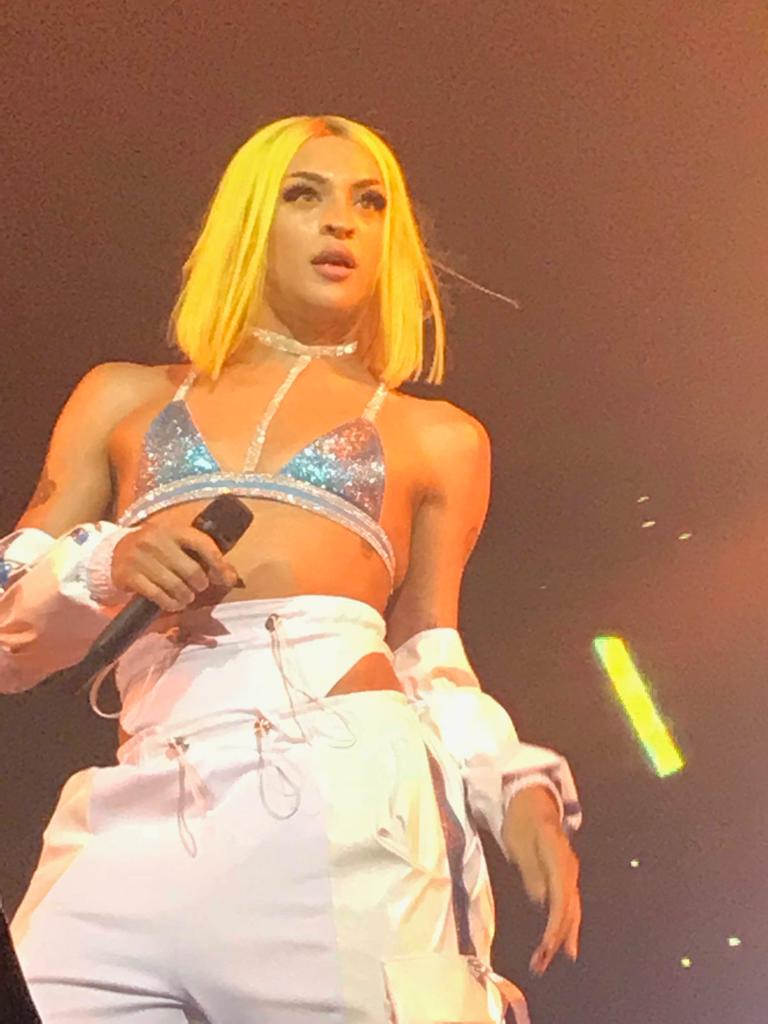
Pabllo Vittar won in 2019, 2020 and 2024.

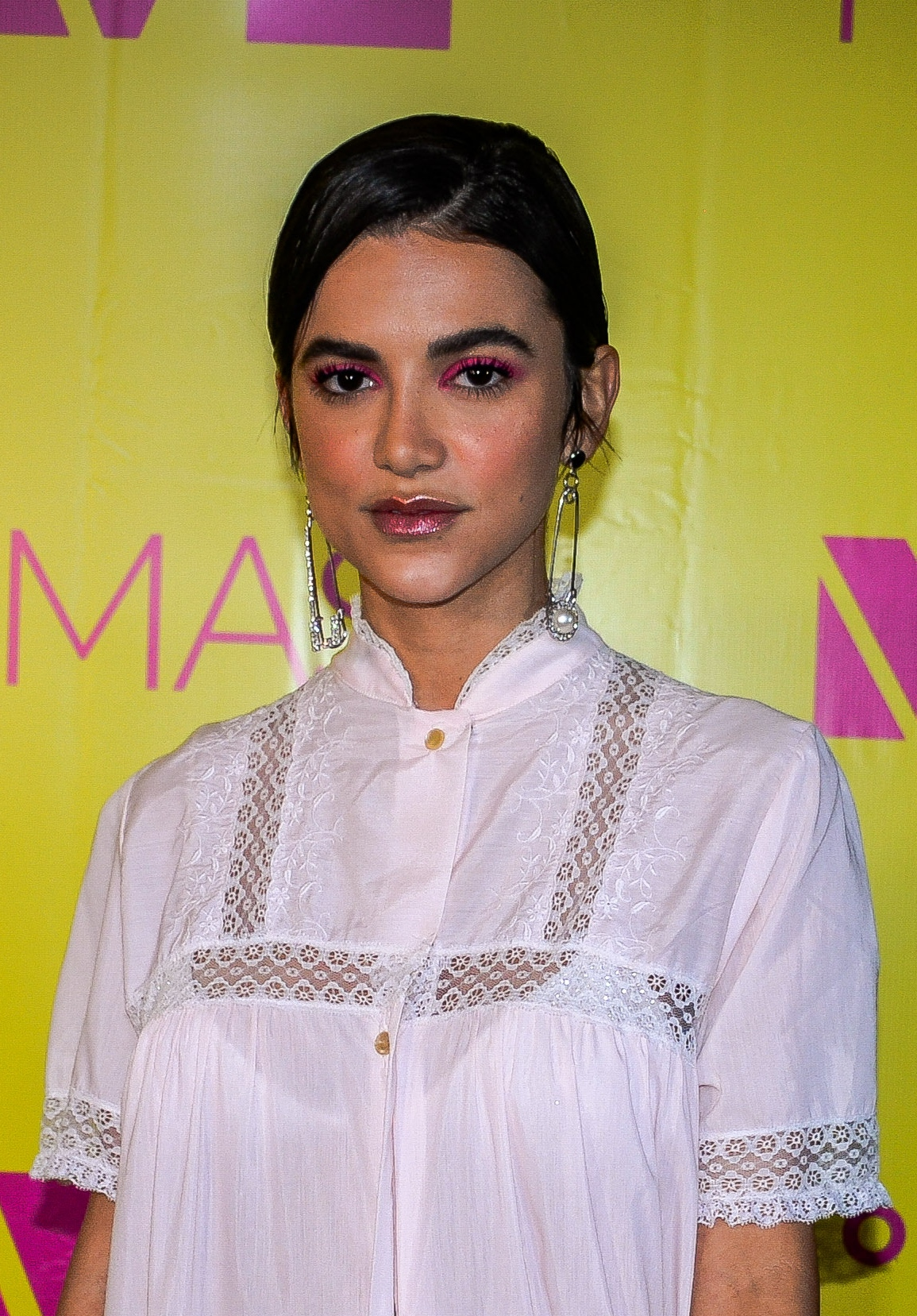
Manu Gavassi won in 2021 and 2022.

Winners are listed first and highlighted in bold.

=== 2010s ===
Year	Artist	Ref
2012
2012	**Restart**	
2012	Agridoce	
2012	ConeCrewDiretoria	
2012	Emicida	
2012	Vanguart	
2013
2013	**Fresno**	
2013	Emicida	
2013	P9	
2013	Pollo	
2013	Restart	
2014
2014	**Anitta**	
2014	Marcelo D2	
2014	MC Guimê	
2014	Pitty	
2014	Projota	
2015
2015	**Anitta**	
2015	Emicida	
2015	Ludmilla	
2015	MC Guimê	
2015	Projota	
2016
2016	**Anitta**	
2016	Karol Conká	
2016	Ludmilla	
2016	Projota	
2016	Tiago Iorc	
2017
2017	**Anitta**	
2017	Alok	
2017	Karol Conká	
2017	Nego do Borel	
2017	Projota	
2018
2018	**Anitta**	
2018	Alok	
2018	Ludmilla	
2018	Nego do Borel	
2018	Pabllo Vittar	
2019
2019	**Pabllo Vittar**	
2019	Anitta	
2019	Emicida	
2019	Kevin O Chris	
2019	Ludmilla	

=== 2020s ===
Year	Artist	Ref
2020
2020	**Pabllo Vittar**	
2020	Anitta	
2020	Djonga	
2020	Emicida	
2020	Ludmilla	
2021
2021	**Manu Gavassi**	
2021	Anitta	
2021	Ludmilla	
2021	Luísa Sonza	
2021	Pabllo Vittar	
2022
2022	**Manu Gavassi**	
2022	Anitta	
2022	Gloria Groove	
2022	L7NNON	
2022	Xamã	
2023
2023	**Matuê**	
2023	Anavitória	
2023	Kevin O Chris	
2023	Luísa Sonza	
2023	Manu Gavassi	
2024
2024	**Pabllo Vittar**	
2024	Jão	
2024	Luísa Sonza	
2024	Matuê	
2024	Pedro Sampaio	

== See also ==
- MTV Video Music Brazil
- MTV VMA International Viewer's Choice Award for MTV Brasil
