= MTV Europe Music Award for Best Song =

Category of MTV Europe Music Awards

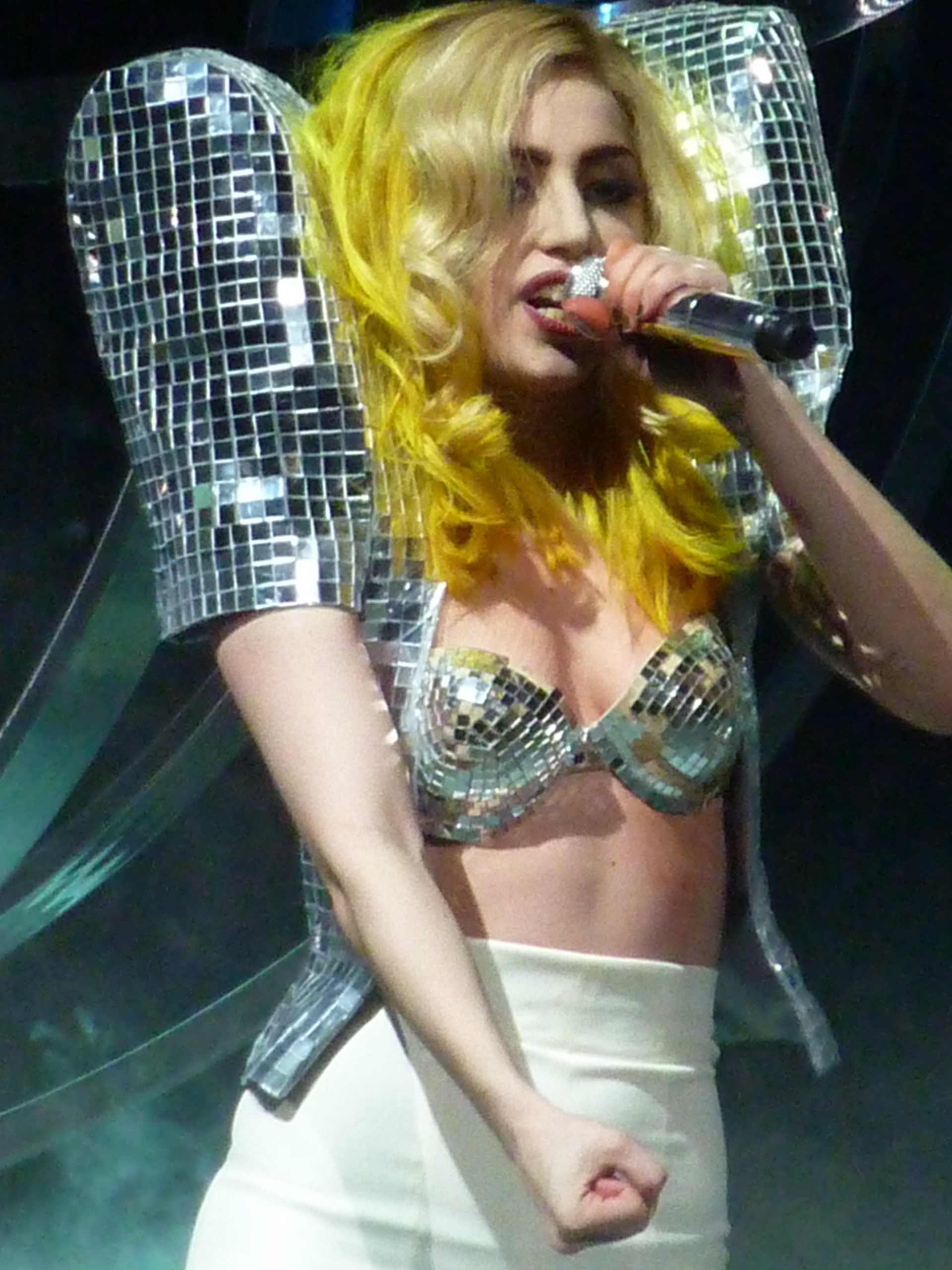
Lady Gaga is the only artist to win this award in two consecutive years: "Bad Romance" won in 2010 and "Born This Way" in 2011

The MTV Europe Music Award for Best Song is the main award of the MTV Europe Music Awards. It was first awarded in 1994, when "7 Seconds" won it, and has been given out every year since. The category was renamed Most Addictive Track for the 2007 and 2008 shows. The artists with the most nominations in this category are Ariana Grande and Beyoncé (both with five). Beyoncé, Jungkook, Lady Gaga and Pink have won the award twice (one of Pink's wins coming when it was called Most Addictive Track). Sabrina Carpenter is the most recent winner, winning in 2024 for “Espresso”

== Winners and nominees ==
Winners are listed first and highlighted in bold

† indicates an MTV Video Music Award for Song of the Year–winning artist.

‡ indicates an MTV Video Music Award for Song of the Year–nominated artist that same year.

=== 1990s ===
Year	Artist	Song	Ref
1994
1994	**Youssou N’Dour and Neneh Cherry**	**"7 Seconds"**	
1994	Aerosmith	"Cryin'"	
1994	Beck	"Loser"	
1994	Björk	"Big Time Sensuality"	
1994	Blur	"Girls & Boys"	
1995
1995	**The Cranberries**	**"Zombie"**	
1995	Michael Jackson	"You Are Not Alone"	
1995	The Offspring	"Self Esteem"	
1995	Seal	"Kiss from a Rose"	
1995	TLC	"Waterfalls"	
1996
1996	**Oasis**	**"Wonderwall"**	
1996	The Fugees	"Killing Me Softly"	
1996	Garbage	"Stupid Girl"	
1996	Alanis Morissette	"Ironic"	
1996	Pulp	"Disco 2000"	
1997
1997	**Hanson**	**"Mmmbop"**	
1997	The Cardigans	"Lovefool"	
1997	Puff Daddy and Faith Evans	"I'll Be Missing You"	
1997	No Doubt	"Don't Speak"	
1997	Will Smith	"Men In Black"	
1998
1998	**Natalie Imbruglia**	**"Torn"**	
1998	All Saints	"Never Ever"	
1998	Cornershop	"Brimful of Asha"	
1998	Savage Garden	"Truly Madly Deeply"	
1998	Robbie Williams	"Angels"	
1999
1999	**Britney Spears**	**"...Baby One More Time"**	
1999	Backstreet Boys	"I Want It That Way"	
1999	Madonna	"Beautiful Stranger"	
1999	George Michael with Mary J. Blige	"As"^{[a]}	
1999	TLC	"No Scrubs"	

=== 2000s ===
Year	Artist	Song	Ref
2000
2000	**Robbie Williams**	**"Rock DJ"**^{[a]}	
2000	Melanie C and Lisa "Left-Eye" Lopes	"Never Be the Same Again"	
2000	Madonna	"Music"	
2000	Sonique	"It Feels So Good"	
2000	Britney Spears	"Oops!... I Did It Again"	
2001
2001	**Gorillaz**	**"Clint Eastwood"**^{[a]}	
2001	Christina Aguilera, Lil' Kim, Mýa and Pink	"Lady Marmalade"	
2001	Crazy Town	"Butterfly"	
2001	Destiny's Child	"Survivor"	
2001	Eminem (feat. Dido)	"Stan"	
2002
2002	**Pink**	**"Get the Party Started"**	
2002	Enrique Iglesias	"Hero"	
2002	Nelly	"Hot in Herre"	
2002	Nickelback	"How You Remind Me"	
2002	Shakira	"Whenever, Wherever"	
2003
2003	**Beyoncé (feat. Jay Z)**	**"Crazy in Love"**	
2003	Christina Aguilera	"Beautiful"	
2003	Evanescence	"Bring Me to Life"	
2003	Sean Paul	"Get Busy"	
2003	Justin Timberlake	"Cry Me a River"	
2004
2004	**Outkast**	**"Hey Ya!"**^{[a]}	
2004	Anastacia	"Left Outside Alone"	
2004	Maroon 5	"This Love"	
2004	Britney Spears	"Toxic"	
2004	Usher (feat. Lil' Jon and Ludacris)	"Yeah!"	
2005
2005	**Coldplay**	**"Speed of Sound"**	
2005	James Blunt	"You're Beautiful"	
2005	The Chemical Brothers	"Galvanize"	
2005	Gorillaz	"Feel Good Inc."^{[a]}	
2005	Snoop Dogg (feat. Justin Timberlake and Charlie Wilson)	"Signs"	
2006
2006	**Gnarls Barkley**	**"Crazy"**^{[a]}	
2006	Nelly Furtado	"Maneater"	
2006	Red Hot Chili Peppers	"Dani California"	
2006	Rihanna	"S.O.S."	
2006	Shakira (feat. Wyclef Jean)	"Hips Don't Lie"	
2007
2007	**Avril Lavigne**	**"Girlfriend"**	
2007	Beyoncé and Shakira	"Beautiful Liar"	
2007	Nelly Furtado	"All Good Things (Come To An End)"	
2007	Mika	"Grace Kelly"	
2007	Rihanna (feat. Jay Z)	"Umbrella"	
2007	Amy Winehouse	"Rehab"	
2008
2008	**Pink**	**"So What"**	
2008	Coldplay	"Viva la Vida"	
2008	Duffy	"Mercy"	
2008	Katy Perry	"I Kissed a Girl"	
2008	Kid Rock	"All Summer Long"	
2009
2009	**Beyoncé**	**"Halo"**	
2009	The Black Eyed Peas	"I Gotta Feeling"	
2009	David Guetta (feat. Kelly Rowland)	"When Love Takes Over"	
2009	Kings of Leon	"Use Somebody"	
2009	Lady Gaga	"Poker Face"	

=== 2010s ===
Year	Artist	Song	Ref
2010
2010	**Lady Gaga**	**"Bad Romance"**	
2010	Eminem (feat. Rihanna)	"Love the Way You Lie"^{[a]}	
2010	Katy Perry (feat. Snoop Dogg)	"California Gurls"^{[a]}	
2010	Rihanna	"Rude Boy"	
2010	Usher (feat. will.i.am)	"OMG"	
2011
2011	**Lady Gaga**	**"Born This Way"**^{[a]}	
2011	Adele	"Rolling in the Deep"^{[a]}	
2011	Bruno Mars	"Grenade"	
2011	Jennifer Lopez (feat. Pitbull)	"On the Floor"	
2011	Katy Perry	"Firework"	
2012
2012	**Carly Rae Jepsen**	**"Call Me Maybe"**	
2012	Fun (feat. Janelle Monáe)	"We Are Young"	
2012	Gotye (feat. Kimbra)	"Somebody That I Used to Know"	
2012	Pitbull (feat. Chris Brown)	"International Love"	
2012	Rihanna (feat. Calvin Harris)	"We Found Love"^{[a]}	
2013
2013	**Bruno Mars**	**"Locked Out of Heaven"**	
2013	Macklemore & Ryan Lewis (feat. Wanz)	"Thrift Shop"	
2013	Daft Punk (feat. Pharrell Williams)	"Get Lucky"	
2013	Robin Thicke (feat. T.I. and Pharrell Williams)	"Blurred Lines"^{[a]}	
2013	Rihanna	"Diamonds"	
2014
2014	**Ariana Grande (feat. Iggy Azalea)**	**"Problem"**	
2014	Eminem and Rihanna	"The Monster"	
2014	Katy Perry (feat. Juicy J)	"Dark Horse"^{[a]}	
2014	Pharrell Williams	"Happy"^{[a]}	
2014	Sam Smith	"Stay With Me"	
2015
2015	**Taylor Swift (feat. Kendrick Lamar)**	**"Bad Blood"**^{[a]}	
2015	Ellie Goulding	"Love Me Like You Do"	
2015	Major Lazer and DJ Snake (feat. MØ)	"Lean On"	
2015	Mark Ronson (feat. Bruno Mars)	"Uptown Funk"	
2015	Wiz Khalifa (feat. Charlie Puth)	"See You Again"	
2016
2016	**Justin Bieber**	**"Sorry"**	
2016	Adele	"Hello"	
2016	Lukas Graham	"7 Years"	
2016	Mike Posner	"I Took a Pill in Ibiza (Seeb Remix)"	
2016	Rihanna (feat. Drake)	"Work"	
2017
2017	**Shawn Mendes**	**"There's Nothing Holdin' Me Back"**	
2017	Clean Bandit (feat. Sean Paul and Anne-Marie)	"Rockabye"	
2017	DJ Khaled (feat. Rihanna and Bryson Tiller)	"Wild Thoughts"	
2017	Ed Sheeran	"Shape of You"	
2017	Luis Fonsi & Daddy Yankee (feat. Justin Bieber)	"Despacito (Remix)"	
2018
2018	**Camila Cabello (feat. Young Thug)**	**"Havana ‡"**	
2018	Bebe Rexha (feat. Florida Georgia Line)	"Meant to Be"	
2018	Ariana Grande	"No Tears Left to Cry"	
2018	Drake	"God's Plan ‡"	
2018	Post Malone (feat. 21 Savage)	"Rockstar †"	
2019
2019	**Billie Eilish**	**"Bad guy"**	
2019	Ariana Grande	"7 Rings"	
2019	Lil Nas X (feat. Billy Ray Cyrus)	"Old Town Road (Remix) †"	
2019	Post Malone and Swae Lee	"Sunflower"	
2019	Shawn Mendes and Camila Cabello	"Señorita"	

=== 2020s ===
Year	Artist	Song	Ref
2020
2020	**BTS**	**"Dynamite ‡"**	
2020	DaBaby (feat. Roddy Ricch)	"Rockstar"	
2020	Dua Lipa	"Don't Start Now"	
2020	Lady Gaga and Ariana Grande	"Rain on Me †"^{[a]}	
2020	Roddy Ricch	"The Box"	
2020	The Weeknd	"Blinding Lights"^{[a]}	
2021
2021	**Ed Sheeran**	**"Bad Habits"**	
2021	Doja Cat (feat. SZA)	"Kiss Me More"	
2021	Justin Bieber (feat. Daniel Caesar & Giveon)	"Peaches"	
2021	Lil Nas X	"Montero (Call Me By Your Name)"	
2021	Olivia Rodrigo	"Drivers License †"	
2021	the Kid Laroi and Justin Bieber	"Stay ‡"	
2022
2022	**Nicki Minaj**	**"Super Freaky Girl"** ^{[a]}	
2022	Bad Bunny and Chencho Corleone	"Me Porto Bonito"	
2022	Harry Styles	"As It Was"	
2022	Jack Harlow	"First Class"	
2022	Lizzo	"About Damn Time ‡"	
2022	Rosalía	"Despechá"	
2023
2023	**Jung Kook (feat. Latto)**	**"Seven"**	
2023	Doja Cat	"Paint the Town Red"	
2023	Miley Cyrus	"Flowers ‡"	
2023	Olivia Rodrigo	"Vampire ‡"	
2023	SZA	"Kill Bill ‡"	
2023	Taylor Swift	"Anti-Hero †"	
2023	Rema and Selena Gomez	"Calm Down ‡"	
2024
2024	**Sabrina Carpenter**	**"Espresso †"**	
2024	Ariana Grande	"We Can't Be Friends (Wait For Your Love)"	
2024	Benson Boone	"Beautiful Things"	
2024	Beyoncé	"Texas Hold 'Em ‡"	
2024	Billie Eilish	"Birds of a Feather"	
2024	Chappell Roan	"Good Luck, Babe!"	

^{^[a]}Nominated With MTV Europe Music Award for Best Video

== Statistic ==
As of 2018.

Number of European Nominations	Total Number
31	105
