= MTV Europe Music Award for Best Danish Act =

Category of MTV Europe Music Awards

The following is a list of the MTV Europe Music Award winners and nominees for Best Danish Act.

== 1990s ==
Year	Winner	Other nominees
1999	see MTV EMA for Best Nordic Act	

== 2000s ==
Year	Winner	Other nominees
2000	see MTV EMA for Best Nordic Act	
2001	see MTV EMA for Best Nordic Act	
2002	see MTV EMA for Best Nordic Act	
2003	see MTV EMA for Best Nordic Act	
2004	see MTV EMA for Best Nordic Act	
2005	Mew	Carpark North; Nephew; Nik & Jay; The Raveonettes
2006	Outlandish	Kashmir; L.O.C.; Nik & Jay; Spleen United
2007	Nephew	Dúné; Suspekt; Trentemoller; Volbeat
2008	Suspekt	Alphabeat; Infernal; L.O.C.; Volbeat
2009	Medina	Dúné; Jooks; L.O.C.; Outlandish

== 2010s ==
Year	Winner	Nominees	Pre-nomination
2010	Rasmus Seebach	Alphabeat; Burhan G; Medina; Turboweekend	
2011	Medina	L.O.C.; Nik & Jay; Rasmus Seebach; Rune RK	
2012	Medina	Aura Dione; L.O.C.; Nik & Jay; Rasmus Seebach	
2013	Jimilian	Medina; Nik & Jay; Panamah; Shaka Loveless	
2014	Christopher	Medina; L.I.G.A; Burhan G; Sivas	Julias Moon; L.O.C; MØ; TopGunn; Nik & Jay
2015	Lukas Graham	Christopher; Ankerstjerne; Djämes Braun; TopGunn	
2016	Benjamin Lasnier	Christopher; Gilli; Lukas Graham; MØ	
2017	Christopher	Kesi; Lukas Graham; Martin Jensen; MØ	
2018	Scarlet Pleasure	Soleima; Skinz; Bro; Sivas	
2019	Nicklas Sahl	Christopher; Gilli; Lukas Graham; MØ	

== See also ==
- MTV Europe Music Award for Best Nordic Act
