= Sweet California =

Spanish girl band

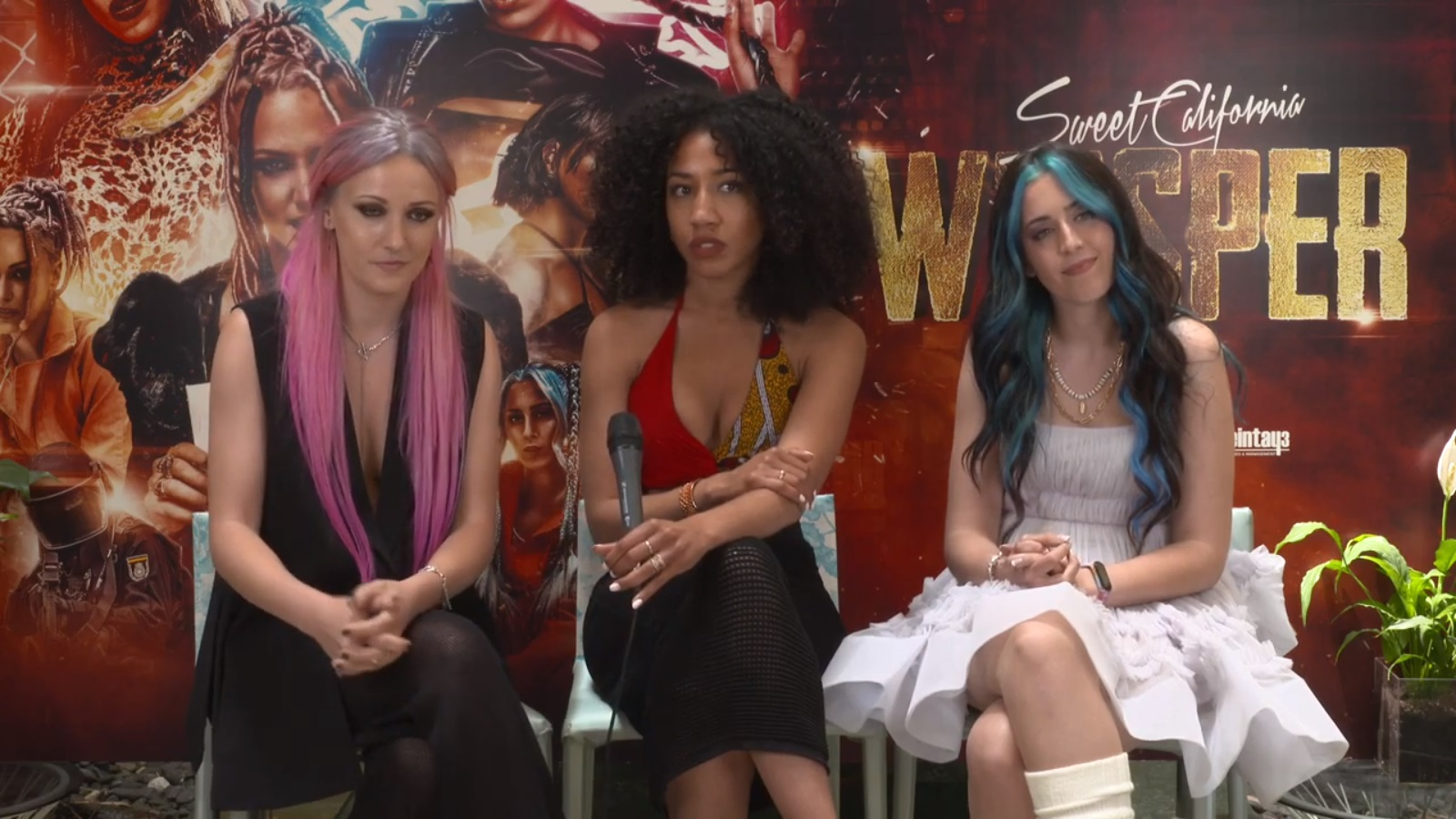
- Sweet California in 2021; Alba, Tamy, Sonia

Background information
- Origin: Spain
- Genre: Latin-pop
- Instrument: Vocals
- Years active: 2013–2022 (Note: Indefinite hiatus.)
- Label: Warner Records
- Members: Sonia Gómez; Alba Reig; Tamy Nsue
- Past members: Rocío Cabrera
- Website: sweetcaliforniaoficial.com

Sweet California is a Spanish girl group formed on 24 January 2013. The group currently consists of Sonia Gómez, Alba Reig and Tamara Nsue; former member Rocío Cabrera departed the group in February 2016, being replaced by Nsue.

They were discovered by record label Warner Music Spain and Must! Producciones and have more than 100,000 records sold in Spain, a Best Spanish Act MTV Award, Gold Record and 2× Platinum Records in Spain.

== History ==
=== 2013: Beginnings and Infatuated ===
In 2013, they were discovered by the management company responsible for the launch of Auryn, and brought to Madrid. The vocalists Rocío Cabrera Torregrosa, Sonia Gómez González and Alba Reig Gilabert began this project, covering viral songs such as "Troublemaker" or "Price Tag" to upload them to YouTube as a presentation. Their great opportunity to present themselves to the public was their performances as opening act on Auryn's "Anti-Heroes" tour.

On July 30, 2013, after having signed a contract with the record company Warner Music Spain that same month, they released their first song: "Infatuated".

=== 2014: Break of Day ===
In April 2014, Sweet California released their first album Break of Day. Recorded between New York, Los Angeles and Spain, it was produced by Tony Sánchez-Ohlsson. The first single was "This is the Life", a country-influenced track with a modern dance base. It was followed by the singles "Comprende (It's over)" and "Indigo". Break of Day reached No. 1 in the Spanish album chart, making Sweet California the only girl band to achieve this popularity, equaled only by the Spice Girls' debut in 1996. Additionally, the album was certified with the Gold Record, and followed with a sold out tour.

=== 2015: Reissue of Break of Day and Head for the Stars ===
In June 2015, coinciding with the beginning of the recording of their second album, Alba, Rocío and Sonia published their first biographical book "El Amanecer de Sweet California". A month later, they released "Wonderwoman", a pop song with urban touches and the collaboration of American hip hop artist Jake Miller. It was released as the lead single from the band's second album, Head for the Stars, which was released on 18 September 2015 and charted directly at No. 1 in the Spanish album chart, thus becoming Sweet California's second album to do so.

=== 2016–2017: Rocío's departure, Head for the Stars 2.0 and 3. ===
In February 2016, an official statement announced Rocío's departure:

... life sometimes puts you in difficult situations. Today, one of us decides to take her own path. Rocío has decided to leave the group. The reasons are personal and, although she saddens us, we ask for all your respect and understanding towards the situation.

Shortly after, Tamara Nsue, a friend and dancer of the group for years, was announced as Rocío's replacement. A month later, the group reissued their second album with new material. Titled Head for the Stars 2.0, the release contains unreleased tracks, re-recordings of the original album with Tamara's voice and acoustic versions. The first single release was "Good Lovin '2.0", whose video clip exceeded one million views in a few days. Head for the Stars 2.0 was released on 18 March 2016 and achieved the Platinum Record for more than 40,000 copies sold. In addition, on 8 April 2016, the band embarked on their "Wonder Tour 2.0" that took them throughout Spain.

The band released their third studio album on 2 December 2016, titled 3. The album is divided into three thematic sections: modern sounds, retro harmonies and songs in Spanish. The album's lead single was "Good Life," a track with touches of tropical house produced by Tonino Speciale.

After three weeks of its launch, 3 earned the Gold Record for selling more than 20,000 copies. After a month of its release, it earned the Platinum Record certification, after selling more than 40,000 copies.

In March 2017, they embarked on the Ladies' Tour, their fourth national tour, which once again took them throughout Spain for more than half a year.

On 1 September 2017, they released the reissue of 3, which contained unpublished material, DVD images of the most significant concert of their Ladies' Tour, at the Wizink Center in Madrid, and new songs. This reissue also featured an unreleased song called "¡Ay Dios Mio!", featuring Danny Romero and also included the collaboration with the Italian duo Benji & Fede in a version of their song "Tutto per una Ragione" entitled "Solo por una Razón".

=== 2018–2019: Origen and Hits Reloaded ===
For a few months, Sweet California were between Miami and Lisbon, writing and recording their fourth album. They continued with their "Ladies Tour" throughout the year. In September 2018, they released the album's first single "Loca", a pop song in Spanish written by the band in Miami with some "Afro" nuances. The song has more than 10 million views on YouTube and has been stated to have "a positive theme and the freedom to decide and live according to what one believes". On 6 October 2018 they exclusively released the album's second single, "El amor es el amor", a song with a Cuban style made in Miami and composed by the three of them. Wanting to make one more album in their language, they announced that their fourth album would be titled Origen, with Alba stating, "It's like going back to our origin, rather to our language". Origen was released on 9 November 2018 and charted at No.2, ending Sweet California's streak of consecutive number-one albums at three.

In 2019, they began their Origen Tour, ending it with more than 70 concerts, including their second concert at the emblematic Wizink Center, in November of the same year.

On 6 December 2019, the band released a greatest hits album titled Hits Reloaded, Sweet California's latest adventure in which they review the past, present and future of the group. The album contains 23 songs, including 4 unreleased songs, the band's most popular hits and completely re-recorded versions with new productions of some of their most emblematic songs.

=== 2020–2022: Hits Reloaded Tour cancelled, Land of the Free Vol. 1 and hiatus ===
The Hits Reloaded Tour was cancelled due to the COVID-19 pandemic. On 3 June 2021, they released "Whisper", a promotional single from their fifth album, Land of the Free Vol. 1. The album was released on 25 February 2022.

In late 2022, the band were revealed to have gone on an indefinite hiatus to dedicate themselves to their solo careers.

== Members ==
- Alba Reig Gilabert (born 5 May 1992, Alicante), 2013–present
- Sonia Gómez González (born 28 July 1991, Seville), 2013–present
- Tamara Nsue Sánchez (born 8 July 1993, Madrid), 2016–present

=== Former members ===
- Rocío Cabrera Torregrosa (born 23 January 1993, Benissa, Alicante), 2013–2016

== Discography ==
=== Albums ===
- Break of Day (2014)
- Head for the Stars (2015)
- 3 (2016)
- Origen (2018)
- Land of the Free Vol. 1 (2022)

==== Reissues ====
- Break of Day (Super Deluxe Edition) (2015)
- Head for the Stars (Argentina Edition) (2015)
- Head for the Stars 2.0 (2016)
- Head for the Stars 2.0 (Argentina Edition) (2016)
- 3 (Mexico Edition) (2017)
- 3 (Ladies' Tour Edition) (2017)

==== Compilation albums ====
- Hits Reloaded

== Awards and nominations ==
| Year | Nomination | Category | Result |
|---|---|---|---|
| 2014 | Kids Choice Awards | Mejor Artista Español | Nominated |
| 2014 | Neox Fan Awards | El grupo que más lo peta | Nominated |
| 2014 | Lo Mejor del 2014 | Mejor álbum nacional | Winners |
| 2014 | Fórmula Music Spain | Mejor artista o grupo revelación 2014 | Nominated |
| 2014 | MTV Europe Music Awards | Mejor Artista Español | Nominated |
| 2014 | Rollers Music Awards | Mejor grupo revelación español | Nominated |
| 2014 | Premios 40 Principales | Artista Revelación en 40 Principales | Nominated |
| 2015 | MTV Europe Music Awards | Mejor Artista Español | Winners |
| 2015 | MTV Europe Music Awards | Mejor Artista Europeo | Nominated |
| 2015 | Neox Fan Awards | El grupo que más lo peta | Nominated |
| 2015 | Premios 40 Principales | Mejor videoclip musical | Nominated |
| 2016 | Kids Choice Awards | Mejor Artista Español | Nominated |
| 2016 | Radio Disney Music Awards | Mejor Artista Español | Nominated |
| 2016 | Premios 40 Principales | Artista o grupo Lo+40 | Nominated |
| 2017 | Kids Choice Awards | Mejor Artista Español | Nominated |
| 2017 | Premios Cadena DIAL | Premio Dial | Winners |
