= MTV Europe Music Award for Best Swedish Act =

Category of MTV Europe Music Awards

The following is a list of the MTV Europe Music Award winners and nominees for Best Swedish Act.

== 1990s ==
Year	Winner	Other nominees
1994	E-Type ^{[a]}	n/a
1999	see MTV EMA for Best Nordic Act	

== 2000s ==
Year	Winner	Other nominees
2000	see MTV EMA for Best Nordic Act	
2001	see MTV EMA for Best Nordic Act	
2002	see MTV EMA for Best Nordic Act	
2003	see MTV EMA for Best Nordic Act	
2004	see MTV EMA for Best Nordic Act	
2005	Moneybrother	The Hellacopters; Kent; Timbuktu; Christian Walz
2006	Snook	The Knife; Lisa Miskovsky; Peter, Bjorn & John; The Sounds
2007	Neverstore	The Ark; Laakso; Timo Räisänen; Those Dancing Days
2008	Neverstore	Kleerup; Lazee; Veronica Maggio; Adam Tensta
2009	Agnes	Adiam Dymott; Darin; Mando Diao; Promoe

== 2010s ==
Year	Winner	Nominees	Pre-nomination
2010	Swedish House Mafia	Kent; Lazee; Miike Snow; Robyn	
2011	Swedish House Mafia	Eric Amarillo; Mohombi; Robyn; Veronica Maggio	
2012	Loreen	Alina Devecerski; Avicii; Laleh; Panetoz	
2013	Avicii	Icona Pop; John de Sohn; Medina; Sebastian Ingrosso	
2014	The Fooo	Icona Pop; Avicii; Tove Lo; Anton Ewald	Kim Cesarion; Mando Diao; Otto Knows; The Fooo
2015	The Fooo Conspiracy	Alesso; Avicii; Tove Lo; Zara Larsson	
2016	The Fooo Conspiracy	Galantis; Laleh; Tove Lo; Zara Larsson	
2017	Zara Larsson	Axwell Λ Ingrosso; Galantis; Tove Lo; Vigiland	
2018	Avicii	Axwell /\ Ingrosso; Benjamin Ingrosso; Felix Sandman; First Aid Kit	
2019	Avicii	Jireel; Zara Larsson; Molly Sandén; Robyn	

^{^[a]}Local Hero Award — Sweden

== See also ==
- MTV Europe Music Award for Best Nordic Act
