= MTV Europe Music Award for Best German Act =

Category of MTV Europe Music Awards

The following is a list of the MTV Europe Music Award winners and nominees for Best German Act.

== Winners and nominees ==
Winners are listed first and highlighted in bold.

=== 1990s ===
Year	Artist	Ref
1994	**H-Blockx ^{[a]}**	
1998
1998	**Thomas D and Franka Potente ^{[b]}**	
1998	Die Ärzte	
1998	Guano Apes	
1998	Liquido	
1998	Oli.P	
1999
1999	**Xavier Naidoo**	
1999	Absolute Beginner	
1999	Freundeskreis	
1999	Guano Apes	
1999	Sasha	

=== 2000s ===
Year	Artist	Ref
2000
2000	**Guano Apes**	
2000	Die Ärzte	
2000	Die Toten Hosen	
2000	Echt	
2000	Fuenf Sterne Deluxe	
2001
2001	**Samy Deluxe**	
2001	Die Ärzte	
2001	Echt	
2001	No Angels	
2001	Rammstein	
2002
2002	**Xavier Naidoo**	
2002	Die Toten Hosen	
2002	Herbert Grönemeyer	
2002	No Angels	
2002	Sportfreunde Stiller	
2003
2003	**Die Ärzte**	
2003	Guano Apes	
2003	Xavier Naidoo	
2003	Seeed	
2003	Wir sind Helden	
2004
2004	**Beatsteaks**	
2004	Die Ärzte	
2004	Die Toten Hosen	
2004	Rammstein	
2004	Sportfreunde Stiller	
2005
2005	**Rammstein**	
2005	Beatsteaks	
2005	Fettes Brot	
2005	Silbermond	
2005	Wir sind Helden	
2006
2006	**Bushido**	
2006	Die Toten Hosen	
2006	Rammstein	
2006	Silbermond	
2006	Sportfreunde Stiller	
2007
2007	**Bushido**	
2007	Beatsteaks	
2007	Juli	
2007	Sido	
2007	Sportfreunde Stiller	
2008
2008	**Fettes Brot**	
2008	Die Ärzte	
2008	MIA.	
2008	Sido	
2008	Söhne Mannheims	
2009
2009	**Silbermond**	
2009	Jan Delay	
2009	Peter Fox	
2009	Söhne Mannheims	
2009	Sportfreunde Stiller	

=== 2010s ===
Year	Artist	Ref
2010
2010	**Sido**	
2010	Gentleman	
2010	Jan Delay	
2010	Unheilig	
2010	Xavier Naidoo	
2011
2011	**Lena**	
2011	Beatsteaks	
2011	Clueso	
2011	Culcha Candela	
2011	Frida Gold	
2012
2012	**Tim Bendzko**	
2012	Cro	
2012	Kraftklub	
2012	Seeed	
2012	Udo Lindenberg	
2013
2013	**Lena**	
2013	Cro	
2013	Frida Gold	
2013	Sportfreunde Stiller	
2013	Tim Bendzko	
2014
2014	**Revolverheld**	
2014	Marteria	
2014	Sido	
2014	Max Herre	
2014	Milky Chance	
2014	Cro	
2014	Pre-nominations: Adel Tawil; Kollegah; Zedd; Andreas Bourani; Casper	
2015
2015	**Lena**	
2015	Andreas Bourani	
2015	Cro	
2015	Revolverheld	
2015	Robin Schulz	
2016
2016	**Max Giesinger**	
2016	Beginner	
2016	Robin Schulz	
2016	Mark Forster	
2016	Topic	
2017
2017	**Wincent Weiss**	
2017	Alle Farben	
2017	Cro	
2017	Mark Forster	
2017	Marteria	
2018
2018	**Mike Singer**	
2018	Bausa	
2018	Feine Sahne Fischfilet	
2018	Namika	
2018	Samy Deluxe	
2019
2019	**Juju**	
2019	AnnenMayKantereit	
2019	Luciano	
2019	Marteria and Casper	
2019	Rammstein	

=== 2020s ===
Year	Artist	Ref
2020
2020	**Fynn Kliemann**	
2020	Apache 207	
2020	Lea	
2020	Nico Santos	
2020	Shirin David	
2021
2021	**badmómzjay**	
2021	Álvaro Soler	
2021	Provinz	
2021	Tokio Hotel	
2021	Zoe Wees	
2022
2022	**badmómzjay**	
2022	Giant Rooks	
2022	Nina Chuba	
2022	Leony	
2022	Kontra K	
2023
2023	**Kontra K**	
2023	Apache 207	
2023	Ayliva	
2023	Luciano	
2023	Nina Chuba	
2023	Ski Aggu	
2024
2024	**Ayliva**	
2024	K.I.Z	
2024	Luciano	
2024	Pashanim	
2024	Shirin David	

^{^[a]}Local Hero Award
^{^[b]}MTV Select — Central

== Multiple awards and nominations ==
The following artists received two or more awards:

Wins	Artist	Nominations
3	Lena	3
2	Xavier Naidoo	4
2	badmómzjay	2
2	Bushido	2

The following artists received two or more nominations:

Nominations	Artist
6	Die Ärzte
6	Sportfreunde Stiller
5	Cro
5	Rammstein
4	Beatsteaks
4	Die Toten Hosen
4	Guano Apes
4	Sido
4	Xavier Naidoo
3	Lena
3	Marteria^{[a]}
3	Silbermond
2	badmómzjay
2	Bushido
2	Echt
2	Fettes Brot
2	Frida Gold
2	Jan Delay
2	Mark Forster
2	No Angels
2	Revolverheld
2	Robin Schulz
2	Samy Deluxe
2	Seeed
2	Söhne Mannheims
2	Tim Bendzko
2	Wir sind Helden

^{^[a]}One nomination partnered with Casper.
