= 2010 MTV Europe Music Awards =

Music awards show held in Madrid, Spain

- Date: 7 November 2010
- Location: Caja Mágica, Madrid, Spain
- Hosted by: Eva Longoria
- Most awards: Lady Gaga (3)
- Most nominations: Lady Gaga and Katy Perry (5)

Television/radio coverage
- Network: MTV Networks International (Europe)

The 2010 MTV Europe Music Awards took place on 7 November 2010 at Caja Mágica in Madrid, Spain. The awards ceremony was presented by Eva Longoria and Justin Bieber was the official MTV EMA 2010 digital host. Nominations were announced on 20 September. Lady Gaga topped the list of nominations with ten, followed by Katy Perry with five, Eminem with four and Thirty Seconds to Mars & Muse with three apiece.

Thirty Seconds to Mars took the stage at the pre-show featuring surprise guest Kanye West at the Alcalá Gate. Shakira opened the show with "Loca", featuring Dizzee Rascal, and the official song of the 2010 FIFA World Cup, "Waka Waka". Performances by Katy Perry and Linkin Park were featured live from outdoor stage at Madrid's Alcalá Gate.

== Nominations ==
Winners are in bold text.

Best Song	Best Video
**Lady Gaga — "Bad Romance"**: Eminem (featuring Rihanna) — "Love the Way You Lie"; Katy Perry (featuring Snoop Dogg) — "California Gurls"; Rihanna — "Rude Boy"; Usher (featuring will.i.am) — "OMG"	**Katy Perry (featuring Snoop Dogg) — "California Gurls"**: Eminem (featuring Rihanna) — "Love the Way You Lie"; Lady Gaga (featuring Beyoncé) — "Telephone"; Plan B — "Prayin'"; Thirty Seconds to Mars — "Kings and Queens"
Best Female	Best Male
**Lady Gaga**: Katy Perry; Miley Cyrus; Rihanna; Shakira	**Justin Bieber**: Eminem; Enrique Iglesias; Kanye West; Usher
Best New Act	Best Pop
**Kesha**: B.o.B; Jason Derülo; Justin Bieber; Plan B	**Lady Gaga**: Katy Perry; Miley Cyrus; Rihanna; Usher
Best Rock	Best Alternative
**Thirty Seconds to Mars**: Kings of Leon; Linkin Park; Muse; Ozzy Osbourne	**Paramore**: Arcade Fire; Gorillaz; The Gossip; Vampire Weekend
Best Hip-Hop	Best Live Act
**Eminem**: Kanye West; Lil Wayne; Snoop Dogg; T.I.	**Linkin Park**: Bon Jovi; Kings of Leon; Lady Gaga; Muse
Best World Stage Performance	Best Push Act
**Tokio Hotel**: Gorillaz; Green Day; Katy Perry; Muse; Thirty Seconds to Mars	**Justin Bieber**: Alexandra Burke; B.o.B; Hurts; Jason Derülo; La Roux; Mike Posner; Professor Green; Selena Gomez & the Scene; The Drums
Best European Act	
**Marco Mengoni**: Afromental; Dima Bilan; Enrique Iglesias; Inna	
Global Icon
**Bon Jovi**
Free Your Mind
**Shakira**

== Regional nominations ==
Winners are in bold text.

Best Adria Act	Best Czech & Slovak Act
**Gramophonedzie**: Edo Maajka; Gibonni; Leeloojamais; Negative	**Charlie Straight**: Aneta Langerová; Ewa Farna; Marek Ztracený; Rytmus
Best Danish Act	Best Dutch & Belgian Act
**Rasmus Seebach**: Alphabeat; Burhan G; Medina; Turboweekend	**Caro Emerald**: Stromae; The Opposites; The Van Jets; Waylon
Best Finnish Act	Best French Act
**Stam1na**: Amorphis; Chisu; Fintelligens; Jenni Vartiainen	**Pony Pony Run Run**: Ben l'Oncle Soul; David Guetta; Phoenix; ~~Sexion D'Assaut~~
Best German Act	Best Greek Act
**Sido**: Gentleman; Jan Delay; Unheilig; Xavier Naidoo	**Sakis Rouvas**: Μelisses; Stavento; Myron Stratis; Vegas
Best Hungarian Act	Best Israeli Act
**The KOLIN**: Hősök; Kiscsillag; Nemjuci; Neo	**Ivri Lider**: Infected Mushroom; Hadag Nahash; Karolina; Sarit Hadad
Best Italian Act	Best Norwegian Act
**Marco Mengoni**: Dari; Malika Ayane; Nina Zilli; Sonohra	**Karpe Diem**: Casiokids; Lars Vaular; Susanne Sundfør; Tommy Tee
Best Polish Act	Best Portuguese Act
**Afromental**: Agnieszka Chylińska; Hey; Mrozu; Tede	**Nu Soul Family**: Deolinda; Diabo na Cruz; Legendary Tiger Man; Orelha Negra
Best Romanian Act	Best Russian Act
**Inna**: Connect-R; Dan Bălan; Deepcentral; Edward Maya and Vika Jigulina	**Dima Bilan**: A-Studio; Noize MC; Serebro; Timati
Best Spanish Act	Best Swedish Act
**Enrique Iglesias**: La Mala Rodríguez; Lori Meyers; Najwa; SFDK	**Swedish House Mafia**: Kent; Lazee; Miike Snow; Robyn
Best Swiss Act	Best Ukrainian Act
**Greis**: Baschi; Lunik; Marc Sway; Stefanie Heinzmann	**Max Barskih**: Alyosha; Antibodies; Dio.filmy; Kryhitka
Best UK & Ireland New Act	Best Arabian Act
**Marina and the Diamonds**: Delphic; Ellie Goulding; Rox; Tinie Tempah	**Mohamed Hamaki**: Joseph Attieh; Khaled Selim

== Performances ==
=== Digital show ===
- Katy Perry — "California Gurls" / "I Kissed a Girl" / "Peacock" / "Hot n Cold" / "Teenage Dream"
- Thirty Seconds to Mars — "Closer to the Edge"

=== Pre show ===
- Thirty Seconds to Mars (featuring Kanye West) — "Hurricane / Power"

=== Main show ===
- Shakira (featuring Dizzee Rascal) — "Loca" / "Waka Waka (This Time for Africa)"
- Kings of Leon — "Radioactive"
- Katy Perry — "Firework"
- Rihanna — "Only Girl (In the World)"
- Kid Rock — "Born Free"
- Linkin Park — "Waiting for the End"
- B.o.B (featuring Hayley Williams) — "Airplanes"
- Miley Cyrus — "Who Owns My Heart"
- Plan B — "She Said"
- Kesha — "Tik Tok"
- Bon Jovi — "What Do You Got?" / "You Give Love a Bad Name" / "It's My Life"

== Appearances ==
- Tim Kash — Red carpet host
- Taylor Momsen — presented Best New Act
- DJ Pauly D and Snooki — presented Best Pop
- Johnny Knoxville — presented Best Alternative
- Kelly Brook and David Bisbal — presented Best Video
- Emily Osment — presented Best Male
- Slash — presented Best Live Act
- The Dudesons — presented Best Hip-Hop
- Alaska and Joaquín Reyes — presented Best Spanish Act
- Thirty Seconds to Mars — presented Free Your Mind
- Miley Cyrus — presented Best Rock
- Dizzee Rascal — presented Best Female
- The Jackass Cast — presented Best Song

== Notable incidents ==
- During her acceptance speech for Best New Artist, Kesha directly addressed her fans, saying: "Hopefully I can inspire you to give your finger to the cynics and fucking be yourself!"
- Further controversy was raised by the cast of Jackass; when presenting the award, Jason "Wee-Man" Acuña removed his trousers to expose his fully nude lower body, displaying his genitals. It was not censored.

== See also ==
- 2010 MTV Video Music Awards
