= Neo (Hungarian band) =

Hungarian electronica band

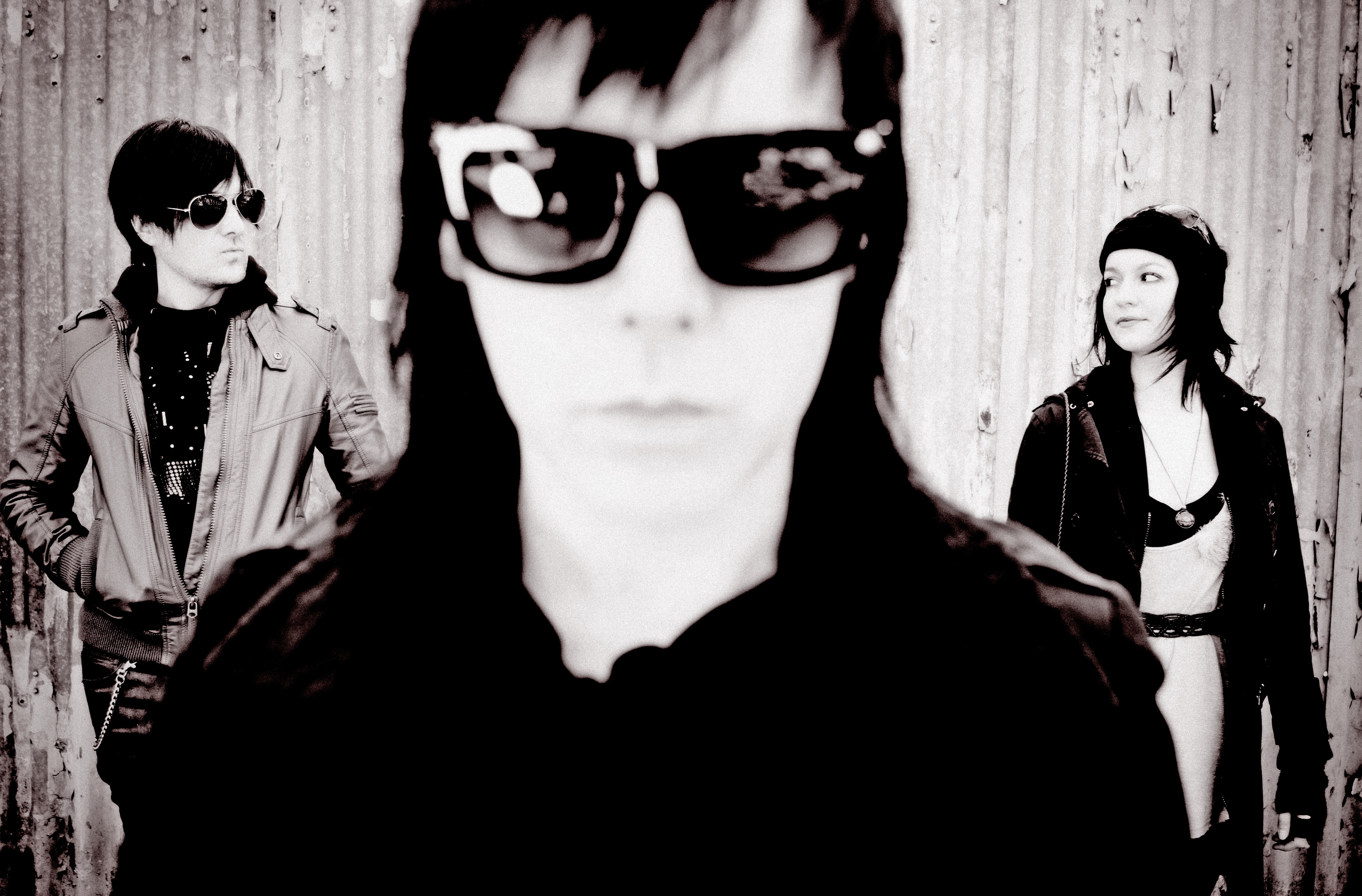

Background information
- Origin: Budapest, Hungary
- Genres: New wave, electronic, pop
- Years active: 1998–Present
- Labels: Neoworld Records
- Members: Mátyás Milkovics; Boglárka Izsó
- Past members: Péter Kőváry; Márk Moldvai; Gergő Szőcs; Enikő Hodosi

Neo is a Hungarian indie-electronic band, best known for producing the music for the movie Kontroll.

== History ==
The band was formed in autumn of 1998 from the idea of Mátyás Milkovics. During the first five years of existence, Márk Moldvai worked with Mátyás Milkovics as a duo. Their first single was released in 1998, an adaptation of "The Pink Panther Theme".

2004 marked the birth of an entirely new Neo, in which, with Mátyás Milkovics, were Enikő Hodosi, Péter Kőváry and Gergő Szőcs, an electro-drummer who joined the creative group in the second part of the year.

On 27 June 2022, former band mate, Péter Kőváry died at the age of 50.

== Discography ==
=== Albums and EPs ===
- Eklektogram (1999) #11
- Lo-Tech Man, Hi-Tech World (2002)
- Kontroll EP (2003)
- Maps for a Voyage (2006) #8
- Six Pixels EP (2010)
- The Picture (2011)

=== Singles ===
- The Pink Panther Theme (1998)
- Persuaders (1999)
- Aiiaiiiyo (2000)
- Diskhead (2002)
- Everybody Come On (2002) #3
- Kontroll/It's Over Now (2004)#13
- It's Over Now (2005, Never released)
- Record Straight (2006) #1
- Absolution (2007) #24
- Spellbound (2008) #39
- Serial Killer (2010)
- Hiii Train (2011)

== Videography ==
=== DVD ===
- "A Planetary Voyage" (2007)
