= 2007 MTV Europe Music Awards =

Music awards show held in Munich, Germany

- Date: 1 November 2007
- Location: Olympiahalle, Munich
- Hosted by: Snoop Dogg

Highlights
- Most awards: Avril Lavigne (2)
- Most nominations: Justin Timberlake (4)

Television/radio coverage
- Network: MTV Networks International (Europe)

The 2007 MTV Europe Music Awards were held at the Olympiahalle in Munich, Germany on 1 November 2007. The show received a total of 78 million votes, the most in MTV Europe Music Awards history.

Foo Fighters opened the show, with frontman Dave Grohl hosting the VIP 'Glamour Pit' area, interviewing celebrities live on air. Other performances on the night included Avril Lavigne, Amy Winehouse with "Back to Black", Tokio Hotel, will.i.am and Babyshambles.

Presenters on the night included Joss Stone, model Lily Cole, R.E.M.'s Michael Stipe and F1 driver Lewis Hamilton.

== Nominations ==
Winners are in bold text.

Most Addictive Track	Video Star
**Avril Lavigne — "Girlfriend"**: Amy Winehouse — "Rehab"; Beyoncé and Shakira — "Beautiful Liar"; Mika — "Grace Kelly"; Nelly Furtado — "All Good Things (Come to an End)"; Rihanna (featuring Jay-Z) — "Umbrella"	**Justice — "D.A.N.C.E."**: Bat for Lashes — "What's a Girl to Do?"; Foo Fighters — "The Pretender"; Justin Timberlake — "What Goes Around... Comes Around"; Kanye West — "Stronger"; The Chemical Brothers — "The Salmon Dance"
Album of the Year	Best Solo Artist
**Nelly Furtado — Loose**: Akon — Konvicted; Amy Winehouse — Back to Black; Avril Lavigne — The Best Damn Thing; Linkin Park — Minutes to Midnight	**Avril Lavigne**: Christina Aguilera; Justin Timberlake; Mika; Nelly Furtado; Rihanna
Best Band	New Sounds of Europe
**Linkin Park**: Fall Out Boy; Good Charlotte; My Chemical Romance; Tokio Hotel	**Bedwetters**: Firma; Yakup
Rock Out	Ultimate Urban
**Thirty Seconds to Mars**: Evanescence; Fall Out Boy; Linkin Park; My Chemical Romance	**Rihanna**: Beyoncé; Gym Class Heroes; Justin Timberlake; Kanye West; Timbaland
Best Headliner	Best Inter Act
**Muse**: Arctic Monkeys; Beyoncé; Foo Fighters; Justin Timberlake	**Tokio Hotel**: Depeche Mode; Fall Out Boy; My Chemical Romance; Thirty Seconds to Mars
Artist's Choice
**Amy Winehouse**
Free Your Mind
**Anton Abele**

== Regional nominations ==
Winners are in bold text.

Best Adria Act	Best Baltic Act
**Van Gogh**: Dubioza kolektiv; Hladno pivo; Jinx; Siddharta	**Jurga**: Double Faced Eels; Skamp; The Sun; Tribes of the City
Best Danish Act	Best Dutch & Belgian Act
**Nephew**: Dúné; Suspekt; Trentemoller; Volbeat	**Within Temptation**: Gabriel Ríos; Goose; Opgezwolle; Tiësto
Best Finnish Act	Best French Act
**Negative**: Ari Koivunen; HIM; Nightwish; Sunrise Avenue	**Justice**: Bob Sinclar; Booba; Fatal Bazooka; Soprano
Best German Act	Best Hungarian Act
**Bushido**: Beatsteaks; Juli; Sido; Sportfreunde Stiller	**Ákos**: Heaven Street Seven; Neo; The Idoru; The Moog
Best Italian Act	Best Norwegian Act
**J-Ax**: Elisa; Irene Grandi; Negramaro; Zero Assoluto	**El Axel**: Aleksander With; Karpe Diem; Lilyjets; Pleasure
Best Polish Act	Best Portuguese Act
**Doda**: Ania Dąbrowska; Kasia Nosowska; Monika Brodka; O.S.T.R.	**Da Weasel**: Blasted Mechanism; Buraka Som Sistema; Fonzie; Sam The Kid
Best Russian Act	Best Romanian Act
**Dima Bilan**: A-Studio; MakSim; Nu Virgos; Sergey Lazarev	**Andreea Bănică**: Alex; Activ; DJ Project; Simplu
Best Spanish Act	Best Swedish Act
**Violadores del Verso**: Dover; El Sueño de Morfeo; La Quinta Estación; Mala Rodriguez	**Neverstore**: Laakso; The Ark; Those Dancing Days; Timo Räisänen
Best Turkish Act	Best Ukrainian Act
**Ceza**: Kenan Doğulu; Nil Karaibrahimgil; Sertab Erener; Teoman	**Lama**: Esthetic Education; Gaitana; Okean Elzy; VV
Best UK & Ireland Act	Best African Act
**Muse**: Amy Winehouse; Arctic Monkeys; Klaxons; Mark Ronson	**D'banj**: Chameleone; Hip Hop Pantsula; Jua Cali; Juma Nature; Samini
Best Arabia Act	
**Rashed Al-Majed**: Elissa; Mohamed Hamaki; Nancy Ajram; Tamer Hosny	

== New Sounds of Europe competition ==
=== Regional competition ===
Adria	Baltic	Denmark	Finland	France	Germany	Italy	Netherlands
Connect; Dani; Dubioza Kolektiv; Elemental; Father; Intruder; Marcelo; Mistakemistake; Svadbas; Tide	Astro'n'Out; Bedwetters; Double Faced Eels; Gravel; No-Big-Silence; Under Marie; Vaidas	Alphabeat; Poker; Trentemøller; Volbeat	Disco Ensemble; Lapko; Lovex; Sturm und Drang; Sunrise Avenue	AaRON; Abd al Malik; Ayọ; Charlotte Gainsbourg; Jehro; Kaolin; Koxie; Christophe Mae; Riké; Rose; Sefye; Shy'm; Soprano; Peter Von Poehl; Christophe Willem	Culcha Candela; Chakuza; Ohrbooten; Itchy Poopzkid; K.I.Z; Madsen	Simone Cristicchi; Fabri Fibra; Mondo Marcio; Fabrizio Moro; Zero Assoluto	C-mon & Kypski; Delain; Fedde le Grand; Jeckyll & Hyde; Moke
Norway	Poland	Portugal	Romania	Spain	Sweden	Turkey	UK
120 Days; Christel Alsos; Margaret Berger; My Midnight Creeps; Susanne Sundfør; Aleksander With	The Car Is on Fire; Coma; Cool Kids of Death; Hurt; Not	Buraka Som Sistema; Mosh; Mundo Secreto; SP & Wilson; The Vicious 5	DJ Project; Firma; Anna Lesko; Simplu	Hanna; Jaula de Grillos; Lantana; Mendetz; Nena Daconte; Sara Da Pin Up; Tulsa; Wonderful Cosmetics; Zodiacs	Million Stylez; Neverstore; Säkert!; Salem Al Fakir	Bedük; DANdadaDAN; Portecho; Suitcase; Yakup	Biffy Clyro; The Enemy; The Fratellis; Calvin Harris; Jamie T; Klaxons; James Morrison; Kate Nash; Mark Ronson; The View

=== International competition ===
- Bedwetters
- Firma
- Yakup
- Sunrise Avenue — Eliminated on 28/10
- Christophe Willem — Eliminated on 27/10
- Jaula de Grillos — Eliminated on 26/10
- Buraka Som Sistema — Eliminated on 25/10
- Chakuza — Eliminated on 24/10
- Klaxons — Eliminated on 23/10 (replaced James Morisson because he wasn't available to perform at the event)
- Neverstore — Eliminated on 22/10
- Zero Assoluto — Eliminated on 21/10
- Delain — Eliminated on 20/10
- Dani — Eliminated on 19/10
- Gravel — Eliminated on 18/10
- Coma — Eliminated on 17/10
- Alphabeat — Eliminated on 16/10
- Aleksander With — Eliminated on 15/10
- Astro'n'out — Eliminated on 14/10

== Performances ==
Artist(s)	Song(s)
Foo Fighters	"The Pretender" "God Save the Queen"
Mika	"Grace Kelly"
Avril Lavigne	"Hot"
My Chemical Romance	"Teenagers"
Amy Winehouse	"Back to Black"
will.i.am	"I Got It From My Mama"
Nicole Scherzinger will.i.am	"Baby Love"
Babyshambles	"Delivery"
Bedwetters	"Dramatic Letter to Conscience"
Tokio Hotel	"Monsoon"

== Appearances ==
- Benji Madden and Joel Madden — presented Best Album
- Michael Stipe — presented Artist's Choice Award
- Lewis Hamilton — presented Best Song
- Dave Grohl and Kelly Rowland — presented Best Video
- Franka Potente and Serj Tankian — presented Best Rock
- Didier Drogba and Lily Cole — presented Best Group
- Wyclef Jean and Craig David — presented Best Urban
- Joss Stone and Paul Van Dyk — presented Best Inter Act
- Boris Becker and Jens Lehmann — presented Best Live Act
- John Heder — presented Best Artist

== See also ==
- 2007 MTV Video Music Awards
