= 2015 MTV Europe Music Awards =

Annual edition of the awards show

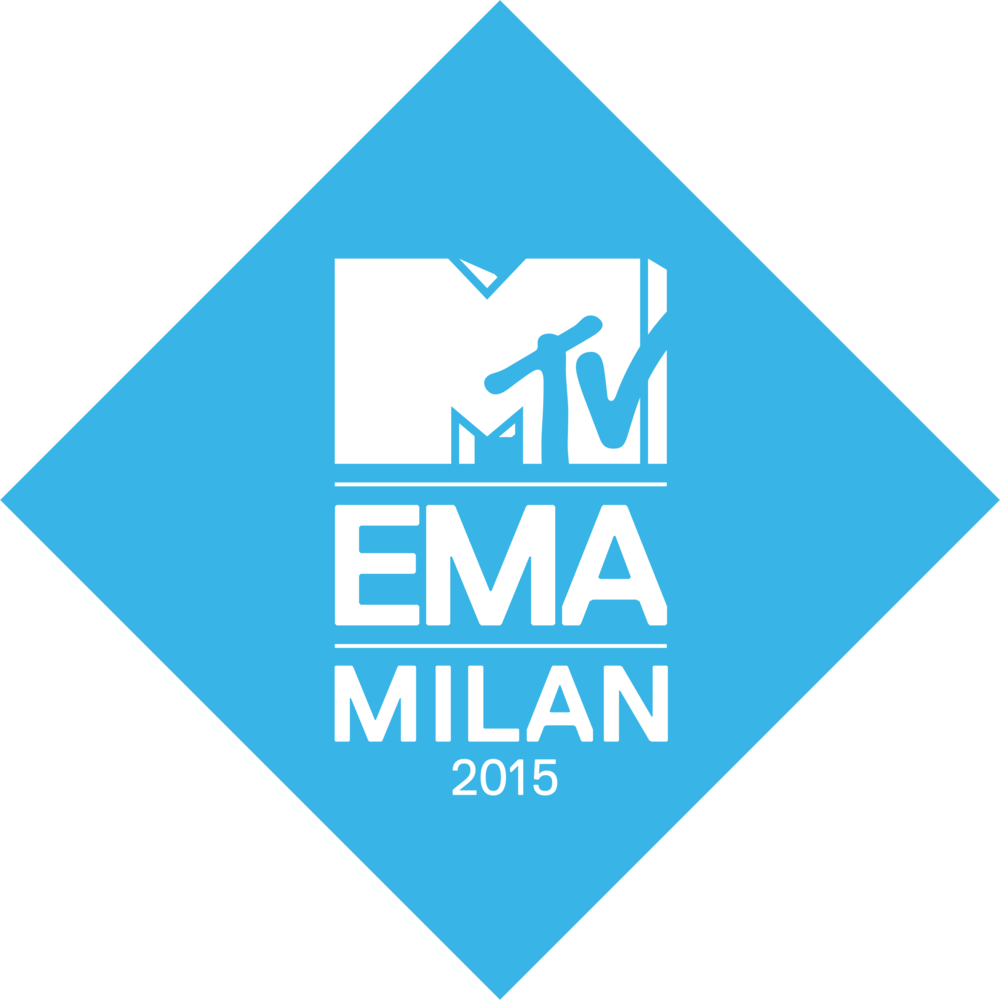
- Date: 25 October 2015
- Location: Mediolanum Forum, Assago (Metropolitan City of Milan), Italy
- Hosted by: Ed Sheeran; Ruby Rose

Highlights
- Most awards: Justin Bieber (6)
- Most nominations: Taylor Swift (9)
- Website: mtvema.com

Television/radio coverage
- Network: MTV; Channel 5

The 2015 MTV EMAs (also known as the MTV Europe Music Awards) were held at the Mediolanum Forum in Assago, near Milan, Italy, on 25 October 2015. This was the third time the awards have taken place in Italy, second time Milan has been the host city, and the first (and so far, the only) time that the awards have been held in October. The awards was held in the same venue as the 1998 MTV EMAs. On 30 September 2015, it was announced that singer Ed Sheeran would host the awards, along with actress Ruby Rose.

Justin Bieber won six awards, including Best Male and Best Worldwide Act.

Throughout mid-2015, Milan also hosted Expo 2015, a partner of this year's awards.

In association with the EMAs, MTV Italia organised an event called MTV Music Week, which ran from 19 October to 25 October. In addition, on the nights of 24 and 25 October, two concerts were held in Piazza del Duomo, Milan, one of which was related to MTV World Stage. International and Italian acts performed on both nights, including Ellie Goulding, Marco Mengoni, Duran Duran, Martin Garrix and Afrojack.

== Nominations ==
Winners are in bold text.

Best Song	Best Video
**Taylor Swift (featuring Kendrick Lamar) — "Bad Blood"**: Ellie Goulding — "Love Me Like You Do"; Major Lazer and DJ Snake (featuring MØ) — "Lean On"; Mark Ronson (featuring Bruno Mars) — "Uptown Funk"; Wiz Khalifa (featuring Charlie Puth) — "See You Again"	**Macklemore & Ryan Lewis — "Downtown"**: Kendrick Lamar — "Alright"; Sia — "Elastic Heart"; Pharrell Williams — "Freedom"; Taylor Swift (featuring Kendrick Lamar) — "Bad Blood"
Best Collaboration	
**Skrillex and Diplo (featuring Justin Bieber) — "Where Are Ü Now"**: David Guetta (featuring Nicki Minaj, Bebe Rexha and Afrojack) — "Hey Mama"; Mark Ronson (featuring Bruno Mars) — "Uptown Funk"; Taylor Swift (featuring Kendrick Lamar) — "Bad Blood"; Wiz Khalifa (featuring Charlie Puth) — "See You Again"	
Best Female	Best Male
**Rihanna**: Ellie Goulding; Miley Cyrus; Nicki Minaj; Taylor Swift	**Justin Bieber**: Pharrell Williams; Kanye West; Jason Derulo; Ed Sheeran
Best New Act	Best Pop
**Shawn Mendes**: Tori Kelly; Jess Glynne; James Bay; Echosmith	**One Direction**: 5 Seconds of Summer; Ariana Grande; Justin Bieber; Taylor Swift
Best Electronic	Best Rock
**Martin Garrix**: Avicii; Calvin Harris; David Guetta; Major Lazer	**Coldplay**: AC/DC; Foo Fighters; Muse; Royal Blood
Best Alternative	Best Hip-Hop
**Lana Del Rey**: Fall Out Boy; Florence and the Machine; Lorde; Twenty One Pilots	**Nicki Minaj**: Kanye West; Kendrick Lamar; Wiz Khalifa; Drake
Best Live Act	Best World Stage Performance
**Ed Sheeran**: Taylor Swift; Katy Perry; Foo Fighters; Lady Gaga and Tony Bennett	**Ed Sheeran**: Afrojack; Alicia Keys; B.o.B.; Biffy Clyro; Charli XCX; Dizzee Rascal; Iggy Azalea; Jason Derulo; Jessie Ware; Kaiser Chiefs; Slash; Tomorrowland; YG
Best Push Act	Biggest Fans
**Shawn Mendes**: James Bay; Jess Glynne; Echosmith; Kwabs; Natalie La Rose; Royal Blood; Shamir; Tori Kelly; Years & Years; Zara Larsson	**Justin Bieber**: 5 Seconds Of Summer; Katy Perry; One Direction; Taylor Swift
Best Look	Artist on the Rise
**Justin Bieber**: Nicki Minaj; Rita Ora; Taylor Swift; Macklemore & Ryan Lewis	**Troye Sivan**: Tori Kelly; Travis Scott; Halsey; Kygo
Video Visionary Award
**Duran Duran**

== Regional nominations ==
Winners are in bold text.

=== Europe ===
Best Adria Act	Best Belgian Act
**Daniel Kajmakoski**: 2Cellos; Hladno pivo; Marčelo; Sassja	**Dimitri Vegas & Like Mike**: Lost Frequencies; Netsky; Oscar & The Wolf; Selah Sue
Best Danish Act	Best Dutch Act
**Lukas Graham**: Ankerstjerne; Christopher; Djämes Braun; Topgunn	**Kensington**: Dotan; Martin Garrix; Natalie La Rose; Oliver Heldens
Best Finnish Act	Best French Act
**JVG**: Antti Tuisku; Kasmir; Mikael Gabriel; Robin	**Black M**: The Dø; The Avener; Christine and the Queens; Fréro Delavega
Best German Act	Best Greek Act
**Lena**: Andreas Bourani; Cro; Revolverheld; Robin Schulz	**Giorgos Mazonakis**: Stavento; Rec; Despina Vandi; Giorgos Sampanis
Best Israeli Act	Best Italian Act
**Eliad**: Café Shahor Hazak; Eden Ben Zaken; E-Z; Guy & Yahel	**Marco Mengoni**: Fedez; The Kolors; J-Ax; Tiziano Ferro
Best Norwegian Act	Best Polish Act
**Astrid S**: Donkeyboy; Kygo; Madcon; Sandra Lyng	**Margaret**: Natalia Nykiel; Sarsa; Tabb & Sound'n'Grace; Tede
Best Portuguese Act	Best Romanian Act
**Agir**: Carlão; Carolina Deslandes; D.A.M.A; Richie Campbell	**Inna**: Dan Bittman; Feli; Randi; Smiley
Best Russian Act	Best Spanish Act
**MBAND**: IOWA; Quest Pistols; Serebro; Ivan Dorn	**Sweet California**: Alejandro Sanz; Leiva; Neuman; Rayden
Best Swedish Act	Best Swiss Act
**The Fooo Conspiracy**: Alesso; Avicii; Tove Lo; Zara Larsson	**Stefanie Heinzmann**: DJ Antoine; Lo & Leduc; Can "Stress" Canatan; 77 Bombay Street
Best UK & Ireland Act	
**Little Mix**: Jess Glynne; One Direction; Ed Sheeran; Years & Years	

=== Africa ===
Best African Act

**Diamond Platnumz**

- Yemi Alade
- AKA
- Davido
- DJ Arafat

=== Asia ===
Best Chinese and Hong Kong Act	Best Indian Act
**Jane Zhang**: Han Geng; Leo Ku; Tan Weiwei; Uniq	**Priyanka Chopra**: Indus Creed; Monica Dogra; The Ska Vengers; Your Chin
Best Japanese Act	Best Korean Act
**Dempagumi.inc**: Babymetal; Sandaime J Soul Brothers; One Ok Rock; Sekai no Owari	**BTS**: B1A4; Got7; GFriend; VIXX
Best Southeast Asian Act	Best Taiwanese Act
**Sơn Tùng M-TP**: Faizal Tahir; James Reid; Nadine Lustre; Noah; Slot Machine; The Sam Willows	**Jay Chou**: JJ Lin; Jolin Tsai; Kenji Wu; Leehom Wang

=== Australia and New Zealand ===
Best Australian Act	Best New Zealand Act
**5 Seconds of Summer**: Guy Sebastian; Peking Duk; Sia; Vance Joy	**Savage**: Avalanche City; Gin Wigmore; Six60; Broods

=== Latin America ===
Best Brazilian Act	Best Latin America North Act
**Anitta**: Emicida; Ludmilla; MC Guimê; Projota	**Mario Bautista**: Enjambre; Ha*Ash; Kinky; Natalia Lafourcade
Best Latin America Central Act	Best Latin America South Act
**J Balvin**: ChocQuibTown; Javiera Mena; Pasabordo; Piso 21	**Axel**: Indios; Maxi Trusso; No Te Va Gustar; Tan Biónica

=== North America ===
Best Canadian Act	Best US Act
**Justin Bieber**: Carly Rae Jepsen; Drake; Shawn Mendes; The Weeknd	**Taylor Swift**: Beyoncé; Kendrick Lamar; Nick Jonas; Nicki Minaj

== Worldwide nominations ==
Winners are in bold text.

=== Best European Act ===
- Agir
- Astrid S
- Black M
- Daniel Kajmakoski
- Dimitri Vegas & Like Mike
- Eliad
- Giorgos Mazonakis
- Inna
- JVG
- Kensington
- Lena Meyer-Landrut
- Little Mix
- Lukas Graham
- **Marco Mengoni**
- Margaret
- MBAND
- Stefanie Heinzmann
- Sweet California
- The Fooo Conspiracy

=== Best African and Indian Act ===
- **Diamond Platnumz**
- Priyanka Chopra

=== Best Asian Act ===
- Dempagumi.inc
- BTS
- Sơn Tùng M-TP
- **Jane Zhang**
- Jay Chou

=== Best Australian and New Zealand Act ===
- **5 Seconds of Summer**
- Savage

=== Best Latin America Act ===
- **Anitta**
- Axel
- J Balvin
- Mario Bautista

=== Best North America Act ===
- **Justin Bieber**
- Taylor Swift

== Performances ==
Artist(s)	Song(s)
Pre-show
Fifth Harmony	"Worth It"
Main show
Macklemore & Ryan Lewis	"Downtown"
Jason Derulo	"Want to Want Me"
Ellie Goulding	"Love Me like You Do"
Twenty One Pilots	"Tear in My Heart"
Rudimental; Ed Sheeran	"Lay It All on Me"
Justin Bieber	"What Do You Mean?"
Jess Glynne	"My Love" "Hold My Hand" "Don't Be So Hard On Yourself"
James Bay	"Hold Back the River"
Tori Kelly; Andrea Bocelli	"Should've Been Us" "No Scrubs" "Real Love" "Ready or Not" "Con te partirò" "Just Give Me a Reason"
Pharrell Williams	"Freedom"

== Appearances ==
- Shay Mitchell and Ashley Benson — presented Best Male
- Novak Djokovic — presented Best Hip-Hop
- Hailey Baldwin, Bianca Balti and Tinie Tempah — presented Best Video
- Mark Ronson - presented Best Live
- Ruby Rose — presented Best North America Act
- Ruby Rose — presented Video Visionary Award
- Martin Garrix and Charli XCX — presented Best Collaboration
- Fifth Harmony — presented Best Look
- Laura Whitmore - presented Biggest Fans

== Voting process ==
Category	Voting Method	Start date	End date
Biggest Fans	Twitter, Instagram and Vine Hashtag	15 September	25 October
Worldwide Act	Website/App	8 September	24 October
Best Video	MTV Music Editorial Team - not eligible for audience voting	N/A	N/A
Video Visionary Award	MTV Music Editorial Team - not eligible for audience voting	N/A	N/A
All others	Website/App	15 September	24 October

== See also ==
- 2015 MTV Video Music Awards
- Expo 2015
