= MTV Europe Music Award for Best Italian Act =

Category of MTV Europe Music Awards

The following is a list of the MTV Europe Music Award winners and nominees for Best Italian Act.

== Winners and nominees ==
Winners are listed first and highlighted in bold.

=== 1990s ===
| Year | Artist | Ref |
|---|---|---|
| 1994 | **Irene Grandi^{[a]}** | |
1998
| 1998 | **Bluvertigo^{[b]}** | |
| 1998 | 99 Posse | |
| 1998 | Articolo 31 | |
| 1998 | Ligabue | |
| 1998 | Vasco Rossi | |
1999
| 1999 | **Elio e le Storie Tese** | |
| 1999 | Alex Britti | |
| 1999 | Jovanotti | |
| 1999 | Negrita | |
| 1999 | Vasco Rossi | |

=== 2000s ===
| Year | Artist | Ref |
|---|---|---|
2000
| 2000 | **Subsonica** | |
| 2000 | Carmen Consoli | |
| 2000 | Lùnapop | |
| 2000 | Paola e Chiara | |
| 2000 | Piero Pelù | |
2001
| 2001 | **Elisa** | |
| 2001 | Marlene Kuntz | |
| 2001 | Neffa | |
| 2001 | Valeria Rossi | |
| 2001 | Tiromancino | |
2002
| 2002 | **Subsonica** | |
| 2002 | Articolo 31 | |
| 2002 | Tiziano Ferro | |
| 2002 | Planet Funk | |
| 2002 | Francesco Renga | |
2003
| 2003 | **Gemelli Diversi** | |
| 2003 | Carmen Consoli | |
| 2003 | Negrita | |
| 2003 | Tiromancino | |
| 2003 | Le Vibrazioni | |
2004
| 2004 | **Tiziano Ferro** | |
| 2004 | Articolo 31 | |
| 2004 | Caparezza | |
| 2004 | Elisa | |
| 2004 | Linea 77 | |
2005
| 2005 | **Negramaro** | |
| 2005 | Giorgia | |
| 2005 | Negrita | |
| 2005 | Laura Pausini | |
| 2005 | Francesco Renga | |
2006
| 2006 | **Finley** | |
| 2006 | Lacuna Coil | |
| 2006 | Tiziano Ferro | |
| 2006 | Jovanotti | |
| 2006 | Mondo Marcio | |
2007
| 2007 | **J-Ax** | |
| 2007 | Elisa | |
| 2007 | Irene Grandi | |
| 2007 | Negramaro | |
| 2007 | Zero Assoluto | |
2008
| 2008 | **Finley** | |
| 2008 | Baustelle | |
| 2008 | Fabri Fibra | |
| 2008 | Marracash | |
| 2008 | Sonohra | |
2009
| 2009 | **Lost** | |
| 2009 | Giusy Ferreri | |
| 2009 | Tiziano Ferro | |
| 2009 | J-Ax | |
| 2009 | Zero Assoluto | |

=== 2010s ===
| Year | Artist | Ref |
|---|---|---|
2010
| 2010 | **Marco Mengoni** | |
| 2010 | Dari | |
| 2010 | Malika Ayane | |
| 2010 | Nina Zilli | |
| 2010 | Sonohra | |
2011
| 2011 | **Modà** | |
| 2011 | Fabri Fibra | |
| 2011 | Jovanotti | |
| 2011 | Negramaro | |
| 2011 | Verdena | |
2012
| 2012 | **Emis Killa** | |
| 2012 | Cesare Cremonini | |
| 2012 | Club Dogo | |
| 2012 | Giorgia | |
| 2012 | Marracash | |
2013
| 2013 | **Marco Mengoni** | |
| 2013 | Emma | |
| 2013 | Fedez | |
| 2013 | Max Pezzali | |
| 2013 | Salmo | |
2014
| 2014 | **Alessandra Amoroso** | |
| 2014 | Caparezza | |
| 2014 | Club Dogo | |
| 2014 | Emis Killa | |
| 2014 | Giorgia | |
| 2014 | Pre-nominations: Dear Jack; Levante; Moreno; Rocco Hunt | |
2015
| 2015 | **Marco Mengoni** | |
| 2015 | Fedez | |
| 2015 | J-Ax | |
| 2015 | Tiziano Ferro | |
| 2015 | The Kolors† | |
| 2015 | Pre-nominations: Annalisa; Francesca Michielin; Baby K; Lorenzo Fragola | |
2016
| 2016 | **Benji & Fede** | |
| 2016 | Alessandra Amoroso | |
| 2016 | Emma | |
| 2016 | Francesca Michielin | |
| 2016 | Salmo | |
| 2016 | Pre-nominations: Alessio Bernabei; Annalisa; Rocco Hunt | |
2017
| 2017 | **Ermal Meta** | |
| 2017 | Fabri Fibra | |
| 2017 | Tiziano Ferro | |
| 2017 | Francesco Gabbani | |
| 2017 | Thegiornalisti | |
2018
| 2018 | **Annalisa** | |
| 2018 | Calcutta | |
| 2018 | Liberato | |
| 2018 | Ghali | |
| 2018 | Shade† | |
| 2018 | Pre-nominations: Cosmo; Emma Marrone; Francesca Michielin | |
2019
| 2019 | **Mahmood** | |
| 2019 | Elodie | |
| 2019 | Coez | |
| 2019 | Salmo | |
| 2019 | Elettra Lamborghini† | |
| 2019 | Pre-nominations: Ultimo; Irama; Boomdabash; Achille Lauro | |

=== 2020s ===
| Year | Artist | Ref |
|---|---|---|
2020
| 2020 | **Diodato** | |
| 2020 | Elettra Lamborghini | |
| 2020 | Levante | |
| 2020 | Irama | |
| 2020 | Random | |
2021
| 2021 | **Aka 7even** | |
| 2021 | Caparezza | |
| 2021 | Madame | |
| 2021 | Måneskin | |
| 2021 | Rkomi | |
2022
| 2022 | **Pinguini Tattici Nucleari** | |
| 2022 | Blanco | |
| 2022 | Elodie | |
| 2022 | Måneskin | |
| 2022 | Ariete | |
2023
| 2023 | **Måneskin** | |
| 2023 | Annalisa | |
| 2023 | Elodie | |
| 2023 | The Kolors | |
| 2023 | Lazza | |
2024
| 2024 | **Annalisa** | |
| 2024 | Angelina Mango | |
| 2024 | Ghali | |
| 2024 | Mahmood | |
| 2024 | The Kolors | |

== See also ==
- TRL Awards (Italy)

== Notes ==
^{^[a]}Local Hero Award — Italy
^{^[b]}MTV Select — Southern
† Indicates an act which received the nomination after winning the pre-nominations round.
