= Sanremo Music Festival 2017 =

Italian song contest (67th edition)

- Tutti cantano Sanremo
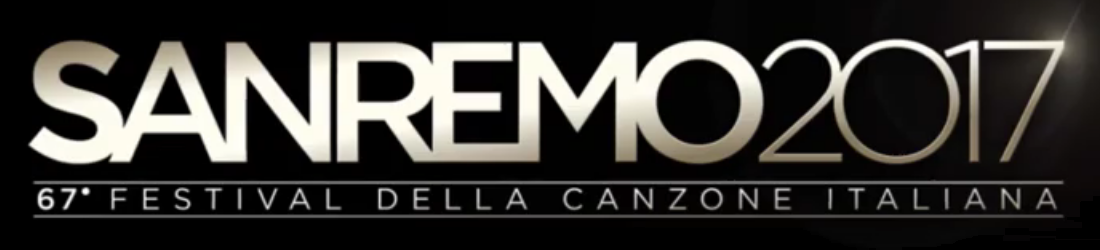

Dates and venue
- Semi-final 1: 7 February 2017
- Semi-final 2: 8 February 2017
- Semi-final 3: 9 February 2017
- Semi-final 4: 10 February 2017
- Final: 11 February 2017
- Venue: Teatro Ariston; Sanremo, Italy

Production
- Broadcaster: Radiotelevisione italiana (RAI)
- Director: Maurizio Pagnussat
- Musical director: Pinuccio Pirazzoli
- Artistic director: Carlo Conti
- Presenters: Carlo Conti and Maria De Filippi

Big Artists section
- Number of entries: 22
- Winner: "Occidentali's Karma"; Francesco Gabbani

Newcomers' section
- Number of entries: 8
- Winner: "Ora mai" Lele

The Sanremo Music Festival 2017 (Italian: Festival di Sanremo 2017), officially the 67th Italian Song Festival (67º Festival della canzone italiana), was the 67th annual Sanremo Music Festival, a television song contest held at the Teatro Ariston in Sanremo, Liguria, between 7 and 11 February 2017, organised and broadcast by Radiotelevisione italiana (RAI). The show was hosted by Carlo Conti, who was also the artistic director of the competition, and Maria De Filippi. Each evening show included a satirical sketch by Maurizio Crozza.

The winner of the contest's main section was Francesco Gabbani, performing the song "Occidentali's Karma". As a result, he earned the right to represent Italy at the Eurovision Song Contest 2017. Lele received first prize in the Newcomers' section, with his song "Ora mai".

== Format ==
The Sanremo Music Festival 2017 took place at the Teatro Ariston. The authors of the 67th edition were Carlo Conti, Ivana Sabatini, Leopoldo Siano, Emanuele Giovannini, Martino Clericetti, Riccardo Cassini, Mario D'Amico and Giancarlo Leone. Maurizio Pagnussat was the show's television director, while Pinuccio Pirazzoli directed the orchestra. The scenography, designed by Riccardo Bocchini for the third consecutive year, was based on the concept of popups, and it was revealed by RAI in late January.

=== Presenters ===
Sanremo Music Festival 2017 presenters

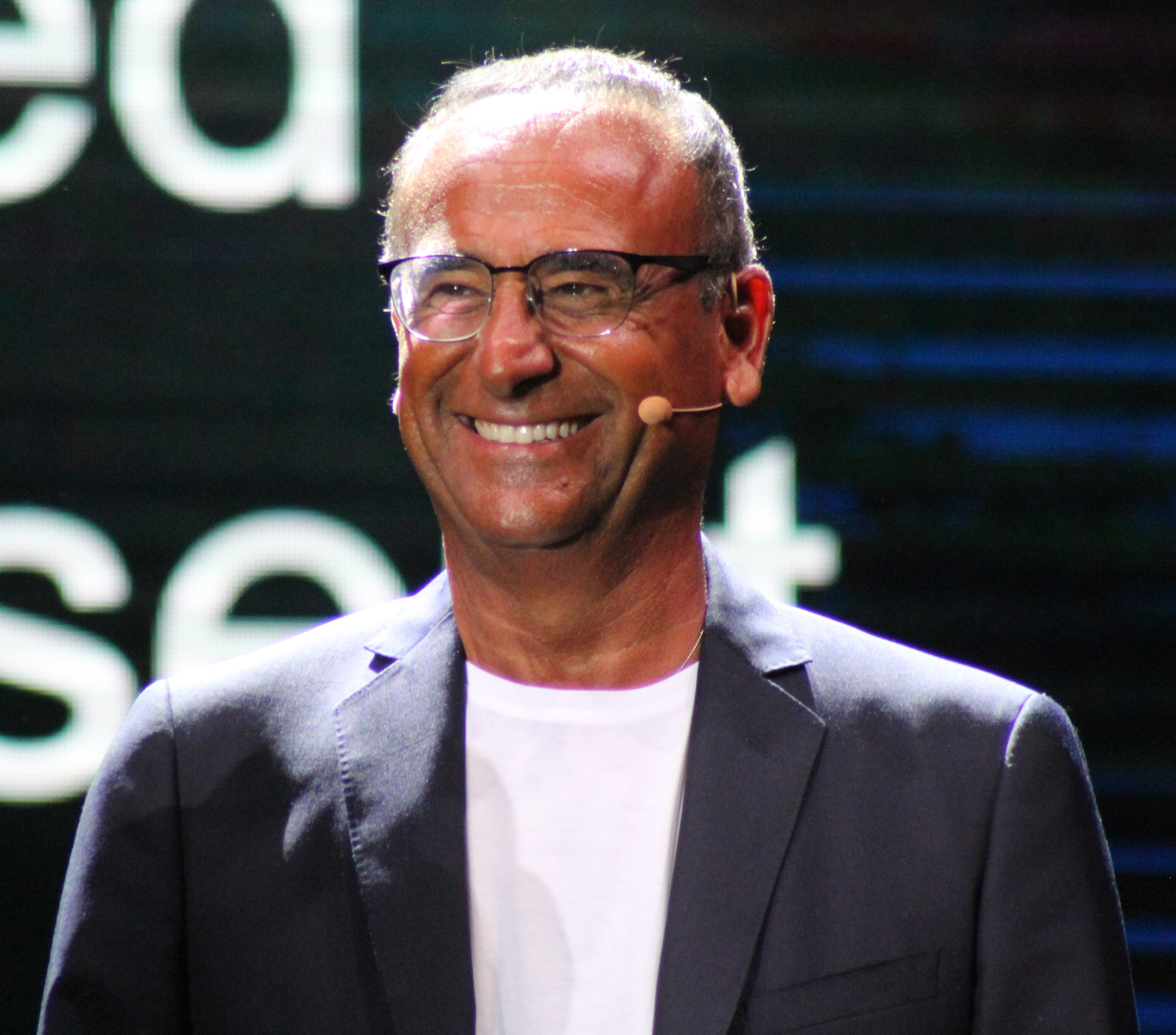
Carlo Conti

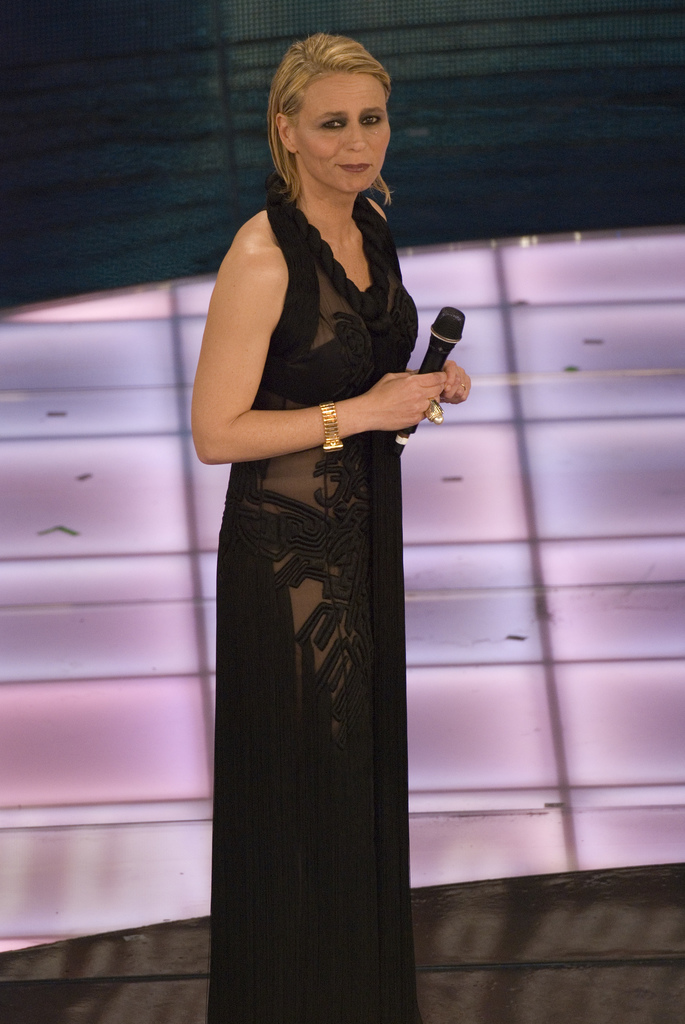
Maria De Filippi

Television presenter Carlo Conti, who was also the competition's artistic director, hosted the Sanremo Music Festival for a third consecutive year in 2017. Conti was joined by Maria De Filippi, one of the most popular Italian TV celebrities and the presenter of several shows broadcast by Canale 5, the main private television network in Italy. Italian comedian Maurizio Crozza also had a minor role, performing political satire sketches during each show.

=== Voting ===
Voting during the five evenings occurred through different combinations of four methods:

- Public televoting, carried out via landline, mobile phone, the contest's official mobile app, and online voting.
- Press jury voting, expressed by accredited journalists that followed the competition from the Roof Hall at the Teatro Ariston.
- A poll, composed of a sample of 300 music fans, which voted from their homes via an electronic voting system managed by Ipsos.
- Expert jury voting, resulting from points assigned by personalities from the world of music, entertainment and culture. The jury was composed of Giorgio Moroder (president), Andrea Morricone, Giorgia Surina, Greta Menchi, Paolo Genovese, Rita Pavone, Violante Placido, Linus.
- During the final, the winner was determined via the combination of public televote (40%), expert jury (30%), and poll (30%).

=== Costs and incomes ===
The overall costs for the Sanremo Music Festival 2017 amounted to €16 million. Carlo Conti's compensation amounted to €650,000, while Maurizio Crozza received €120,000 for his performances. Maria De Filippi refused any compensation, and presented the festival for free.

In January 2017, RAI announced an expected income of more than €25.5 million, including €23 million from sponsorships. Ticket prices to attend the Sanremo Music Festival 2017 at the Teatro Ariston ranged from €100 for a balcony seat, up to €672 for a ticket in the stalls area during the grand final.

== Selections ==
=== Newcomers' section ===
The artists competing in the Newcomers' section were selected through two separate contests. Area Sanremo, organized by the comune of Sanremo, selected two entries of the main competition, while the remaining six artists where chosen through Sanremo Giovani, created by RAI.

==== Area Sanremo ====
Area Sanremo 2016 was a contest created by the comune of Sanremo. In August and September 2016, an itinerant series of lessons involving Italian music schools and cultural associations, named Area Sanremo Tour, was organized to encourage artists to compete in the contest. 412 songs entered Area Sanremo. In October 2016, a series of lessons about music and the music industry was offered to all competing artists. On 2 November 2016, competing artists were reduced to 70 acts, selected by a commission composed of Massimo Cotto, which also presided it, Stefano Senardi, also serving as the artistic director of the event, and Maurizio Caridi. Cotto, Senardi and Caridi, together with Antonio Vandoni and Andrea Mirò, also composed the commission which selected the 8 winners of the contest—Braschi, Andrea Corona, Marika Adele, Carlo Bolacchi, Carmen Alessandrello, Ylenia Lucisano, Valeria Farinacci and Diego Esposito—which were announced on 12 November 2016. Finally, RAI chose two acts among the eight winners—Braschi and Valeria Farinacci—which were allowed to compete in the Newcomers' section of the Sanremo Music Festival 2017. The selected entries were announced by Carlo Conti on 12 December 2016, during the TV show Sarà Sanremo.

==== Sanremo Giovani ====
The contest organized by RAI to select six of the eight contestants of the Newcomers' section of the Sanremo Music Festival 2017 was named Sanremo Giovani. 560 acts entered the contest. On 21 October 2016, an internal commission reduced the number of competing artists to 60, eliminating the remaining ones. Following the rules of the contest, the winner of the singing contest Castrocaro Music Festival 2016—Ethan Lara—was also allowed to compete in the following phase of the competition as an additional entry. On 25 October 2016, the 61 selected acts auditioned in Rome. Following their performances, 12 artists, announced on 4 November 2016, were selected as the finalists of Sanremo Giovani. The final of the contest was held during the TV show Sarà Sanremo on 12 December 2016. Artists performed their songs in 4 different groups. One artist for each group was eliminated.

Group 1

- Carola Campagna – "Prima che arrivi il giorno" (eliminated)
- Marianne Mirage – "Le canzoni fanno male"
- Maldestro – "Canzone per Federica"

Group 2

- Chiara Grispo – "Niente è impossibile"
- La Rua – "Tutta la vita questa vita" (eliminated)
- Lele – "Ora mai"

Group 3

- Leonardo Lamacchia – "Ciò che resta"
- The Shalalalas – "Difficile" (eliminated)
- Valeria – "La vita è un'illusione"

Group 4

- Aprile & Mangiaracina – "Il cielo di Napoli" (eliminated)
- Tommaso Pini – "Cose che danno ansia"
- Francesco Guasti – "Universo"

Finally, among the 8 remaining artists, two were eliminated as a result of a new voting. In both phases, eliminations were decided by a jury, composed of Massimo Ranieri, Fabio Canino, Anna Foglietta, Amadeus and Andrea Delogu. Francesco Guasti, Lele, Leonardo Lamacchia, Maldestro, Marianne Mirage and Tommaso Pini were chosen as contestants of the Newcomers' section of the Sanremo Music Festival 2017.

=== Big Artists section ===
The artists competing in the Big Artists section were selected by an internal commission and announced by Carlo Conti on 12 December 2016, during the TV show Sarà Sanremo. According to the rules of the 2017 contest, competing artists should have been 20 but, on 6 December 2016, Carlo Conti decided to change the rules, increasing the number of entries to 22.

== Competing entries ==
Competing songs and artists, showing writers, orchestra conductor and results achieved
Big Artists section
Song	Artist(s)	Songwriter(s)	Orchestra conductor	Rank	Sanremo Music Festival Awards
"Occidentali's Karma"	Francesco Gabbani	Francesco Gabbani; Luca Chiaravalli; Fabio Ilacqua	Luca Chiaravalli	1	Winner of the "Big Artists" section – Golden Lion; TimMusic Award for Most-Streamed Song on the Final's Day
"Che sia benedetta"	Fiorella Mannoia	Amara; Salvatore Mineo	Valeriano Chiaravalle	2	Press, Radio, TV & Web Award "Lucio Dalla"; Sergio Bardotti Award for Best Lyrics
"Vietato morire"	Ermal Meta	Ermal Meta	Diego Calvetti	3	Critics' Award "Mia Martini"
"Il diario degli errori"	Michele Bravi	Federica Abbate; Cheope; Giuseppe Anastasi	Enzo Campagnoli	4	
"Fatti bella per te"	Paola Turci	Paola Turci; Giulia Anania; Luca Chiaravalli; Davide Simonetta	Luca Chiaravalli	5	
"Con te"	Sergio Sylvestre	Giorgia Todrani; Stefano Maiuolo	Pino Perris	6	
"Portami via"	Fabrizio Moro	Fabrizio Mobrici	Pino Perris	7	
"Tutta colpa mia"	Elodie	Emma Marrone; Giovanni Pollex; Oscar Angiuli; Francesco Cianciola	Fabio Gurian	8	
"Ora esisti solo tu"	Bianca Atzei	Francesco Silvestre	Marco Grasso	9	
"Vedrai"	Samuel	Samuel Umberto Romano; Riccardo Onori; Christian Rigano	Christian Rigano	10	
"Mani nelle mani"	Michele Zarrillo	Michele Zarrillo; Giampiero Artegiani	Fabio Gurian	11	
"Il cielo non mi basta"	Lodovica Comello	Federica Abbate; Antonio Di Martino; Dario Faini; Fabrizio Ferraguzzo	Roberto Rossi	12	
"Spostato di un secondo"	Marco Masini	Marco Masini; Diego Calvetti; Zibba	Diego Calvetti	13	
"Nessun posto è casa mia"	Chiara	Niccolò Verrienti; Carlo Verrienti	Mauro Pagani	14	
"Nel mezzo di un applauso"	Alessio Bernabei	Roberto Casalino; Dario Faini; Vanni Casagrande	Pino Perris	15	
"Ragazzi fuori"	Clementino	Clementino; Marracash; Shablo; Zef	Enzo Campagnoli	16	
"Di rose e di spine"	Al Bano	Maurizio Fabrizio; Katia Astarita	Alterisio Paoletti	Semi-finalist	"Giancarlo Bigazzi" Award for Best Arrangement
"La prima stella"	Gigi D'Alessio	Gigi D'Alessio	Adriano Pennino	Semi-finalist	
"Fa talmente male"	Giusy Ferreri	Roberto Casalino; Takagi; Ketra; Paolo Catalano	Roberto Rossi	Semi-finalist	
"L'ottava meraviglia"	Ron	Rosalino Cellamare; Francesco Caprara; Mattia Del Forno; Emiliano Mangia	Pino Perris	Semi-finalist	
"Do retta a te"	Nesli feat. Alice Paba	Francesco Tarducci; Orazio Grillo	Umberto Iervolino	Eliminated	
"Togliamoci la voglia"	Raige feat. Giulia Luzi	Raige; Zibba; Antonio Iammarino; Luca Chiaravalli	Massimo Zanotti	Eliminated	
Newcomers' section
Song	Artist(s)	Songwriter(s)	Orchestra conductor	Rank	Sanremo Music Festival Awards
"Ora mai"	Lele	Raffaele Esposito; Rory Di Benedetto; Rosario Canale	Pino Perris	1	Winner of the Newcomers' section – Silver Lion
"Canzone per Federica"	Maldestro	Antonio Prestieri	Maurizio Filardo	2	Critics' Award "Mia Martini"; Assomusica Award for Best Performance
"Universo"	Francesco Guasti	Francesco Guasti; Franscesco Musumeci; Francesco Ciccotti	Giulio Nenna	3	
"Ciò che resta"	Leonardo Lamacchia	Gianni Pollex; Mauro Lusini	Roberto Procaccini	4	
"Nel mare ci sono i coccodrilli"	Braschi	Federico Braschi; Massimo Marches	Guido Facchini	Eliminated	
"Le canzoni fanno male"	Marianne Mirage	Giuseppe Rinaldi; Francesco Bianconi	Daniele Parziani	Eliminated	
"Cose che danno ansia"	Tommaso Pini	Andrea Francesca Dall'Ora; Tommaso Pini; Andrea Amati	Sergio Dall'Ora	Eliminated	Press, Radio, TV & Web Award "Lucio Dalla"
"Insieme"	Valeria Farinacci	Giuseppe Anastasi	Francesco Morettini	Eliminated	

== Shows ==
=== First evening ===
Tiziano Ferro opened the show with a tribute to Luigi Tenco, marking the 50th anniversary of his death: he sang "Mi sono innamorato di te". During the evening, Ferro also performed his recent hits "Potremmo ritornare" and "Il conforto", in a duet with Carmen Consoli. International guests on stage were the band Clean Bandit, with the song "Rockabye", and Ricky Martin, who performed a megamix composed of "Livin' la Vida Loca", "Shake Your Bon-Bon", "Vente Pa' Ca", "La Mordidita", "La Bomba", "María" and "The Cup of Life".

During the evening, there have been moments dedicated to: the fight against bullying within Italian public schools; the privacy on the web; the people affected by earthquakes that struck central Italy in recent months. For this reason are intervened: a delegation of Italian Armed Forces and Italian Red Cross; the founders of MaBasta association; actor Raoul Bova; sports journalist and TV presenter Diletta Leotta.

Maurizio Crozza performed a political satire sketch about Matteo Renzi, Matteo Salvini and Virginia Raggi. Other guests of this first evening were: comedians Paola Cortellesi and Antonio Albanese; actress Rocio Muñoz Morales; basketball player Marco Cusin and volleyball player Valentina Diouf.

Big Artists

At risk of elimination

Performances of the contestants of the Big Artists section on the first evening
R/O	Artist	Song	Votes			Place
R/O	Artist	Song	Press Jury (weight 50%)	Public (weight 50%)	Total	Place
1	Giusy Ferreri	"Fa talmente male"	2.34%	3.25%	2.80%	11
2	Fabrizio Moro	"Portami via"	10.42%	14.09%	12.25%	3
3	Elodie	"Tutta colpa mia"	10.16%	10.91%	10.54%	4
4	Lodovica Comello	"Il cielo non mi basta"	2.08%	13.76%	7.92%	6
5	Fiorella Mannoia	"Che sia benedetta"	23.43%	16.53%	19.98%	1
6	Alessio Bernabei	"Nel mezzo di un applauso"	1.56%	9.36%	5.46%	8
7	Al Bano	"Di rose e di spine"	7.03%	7.54%	7.29%	7
8	Samuel	"Vedrai"	15.89%	4.62%	10.25%	5
9	Ron	"L'ottava meraviglia"	4.95%	3.74%	4.34%	10
10	Clementino	"Ragazzi fuori"	3.91%	6.35%	5.13%	9
11	Ermal Meta	"Vietato morire"	18.23%	9.85%	14.04%	2

=== Second evening ===
The second evening was opened by Japanese magician Hiroki Hara. The competition started with four out eight entries in the Newcomers' section. Then it was the turn of the other eleven entries of Big Artists section.

Three international guests of the evening were Robbie Williams, who performed "Love my life" and kissed Maria De Filippi on her lips; Biffy Clyro that have sung "Re-arrange"; and Canadian actor Keanu Reeves who has been interviewed by Maria De Filippi. Another singer on the stage was Giorgia, who performed her new single "Vanità" and a medley of her old hits "E poi", "Come saprei", "Di sole e d’azzurro".

During the course of the evening, Francesco Totti was interviewed by Carlo Conti and Maria De Filippi about his career and private life. Other guests of this evening were: the trio by Enrico Brignano, Gabriele Cirilli, Flavio Insinna; actress Sveva Alviti. Salvatore Nicotra was the special guests for "Tutti Cantano Sanremo". Maurizio Crozza dedicated his political satire sketch to the relationship between Italian State and woman rights.

Big Artists

At risk of elimination

Performances of the contestants of the Big Artists section on the second evening
R/O	Artist	Song	Votes			Place
R/O	Artist	Song	Press Jury (weight 50%)	Public (weight 50%)	Total	Place
1	Bianca Atzei	"Ora esisti solo tu"	2.80%	5.02%	3.90%	11
2	Marco Masini	"Spostato di un secondo"	11.66%	7.72%	9.70%	5
3	Nesli feat. Alice Paba	"Do retta a te"	2.56%	7.19%	4.87%	10
4	Sergio Sylvestre	"Con te"	8.86%	11.96%	10.41%	4
5	Gigi D'Alessio	"La prima stella"	4.43%	11.32%	7.88%	6
6	Michele Bravi	"Il diario degli errori"	10.02%	22.93%	16.48%	2
7	Paola Turci	"Fatti bella per te"	17.72%	4.59%	11.16%	3
8	Francesco Gabbani	"Occidentali's Karma"	22.84%	11.30%	17.07%	1
9	Michele Zarrillo	"Mani nelle mani"	4.43%	6.72%	5.58%	8
10	Chiara	"Nessun posto è casa mia"	9.09%	6.36%	7.72%	7
11	Raige feat. Giulia Luzi	"Togliamoci la voglia"	5.59%	4.89%	5.24%	9

Newcomers

Advanced in the final

Performances of the contestants of the Newcomers' Artists section on the second evening
R/O	Artist	Song	Votes			Place
R/O	Artist	Song	Press Jury (weight 50%)	Public (weight 50%)	Total	Place
1	Marianne Mirage	"Le canzoni fanno male"	28.75%	19.04%	23.90%	3
2	Francesco Guasti	"Universo"	23.75%	36.47%	30.11%	1
3	Braschi	"Nel mare non ci sono i coccodrilli"	22.92%	16.58%	19.75%	4
4	Leonardo Lamacchia	"Ciò che resta"	24.58%	27.91%	26.25%	2

=== Third evening ===
The third evening will feature sixteen acts competing in the Big Artists section performing cover versions of either Italian songs or international hit songs that have been translated into Italian. The competing acts had an option to perform their cover together with a guest artist. Also, the six songs that are at risk of elimination are performed, and voted on by means of the press room vote and televoting. The four remain songs of the Newcomers section are also performed and by a vote of the press room and the public through televoting and two are eliminated.

Big Artists – Cover Competition

Covers eliminated

R/O	Artist	Song (Original artist)	Votes			Place
R/O	Artist	Song (Original artist)	Press Jury (50%)	Public (50%)	Total	Place
1	Chiara	"Diamante" (Zucchero Fornaciari)	1.79%	4.25%	3.02%	14
2	Ermal Meta	"Amara terra mia" (Domenico Modugno)	21.70%	6.19%	13.95%	1
3	Lodovica Comello	"Le mille bolle blu" (Mina)	0.45%	11.12%	5.78%	7
4	Al Bano	"Pregherò" (Adriano Celentano)	1.34%	6.43%	3.89%	12
5	Fiorella Mannoia	"Sempre e per sempre" (Francesco De Gregori)	12.08%	8.76%	10.42%	4
6	Alessio Bernabei	"Un giorno credi" (Edoardo Bennato)	0.00%	6.75%	3.38%	13
7	Paola Turci	"Un'emozione da poco" (Anna Oxa)	17.67%	5.03%	11.35%	2
8	Gigi D'Alessio	"L'immensità" (Don Backy)	2.68%	8.43%	5.56%	9
9	Francesco Gabbani	"Susanna" (Adriano Celentano)	3.80%	7.48%	5.64%	8
10	Marco Masini	"Signor Tenente" (Giorgio Faletti)	14.77%	6.11%	10.44%	3
11	Michele Zarrillo	"Se tu non torni" (Miguel Bosè)	1.35%	2.89%	2.11%	15
12	Elodie	"Quando finisce un amore" (Riccardo Cocciante)	7.83%	5.02%	6.43%	6
13	Samuel	"Ho difeso il mio amore" (I Nomadi)	1.79%	1.85%	1.82%	16
14	Sergio Sylvestre	"La pelle nera" (Nino Ferrer)	3.57%	4.45%	4.01%	11
15	Fabrizio Moro	"La leva calcistica della classe '68" (Francesco De Gregori)	5.59%	5.09%	5.34%	10
16	Michele Bravi	"La stagione dell'amore" (Franco Battiato)	3.58%	10.14%	6.86%	5
—N/a	Bianca Atzei	"Con il nastro rosa" (Lucio Battisti)	Did not perform			—N/a
—N/a	Clementino	"Svalutation" (Adriano Celentano)	Did not perform			—N/a
—N/a	Giusy Ferreri	"Il paradiso" (Patty Pravo)	Did not perform			—N/a
—N/a	Nesli feat. Alice Paba	"Ma il cielo è sempre più blu" (Rino Gaetano)	Did not perform			—N/a
—N/a	Raige feat. Giulia Luzi	"C'era un ragazzo che come me amava i Beatles e i Rolling Stones" (Gianni Morandi)	Did not perform			—N/a
—N/a	Ron	"Insieme a te non ci sto più" (Caterina Caselli)	Did not perform			—N/a

Repechage

Readmitted to the final

R/O	Artist	Song	Votes of the third evening			Place
R/O	Artist	Song	Public (50%)	Press Jusy (50%)	Total	Place
1	Ron	"L'ottava meraviglia"	23.07%	21.17%	22.12%	1
2	Raige feat. Giulia Luzi	"Togliamoci la voglia"	8.44%	12.61%	10.53%	6
3	Bianca Atzei	"Ora esisti solo tu"	26.93%	12.84%	19.88%	2
4	Clementino	"Ragazzi fuori"	15.86%	18.47%	17.16%	3
5	Giusy Ferreri	"Fa talmente male"	11.14%	22.75%	16.49%	4
6	Nesli feat. Alice Paba	"Do retta a te"	14.56%	12.16%	13.36%	5

Newcomers

Advanced in the final

Performances of the contestants of the Newcomers' Artists section on the third evening
R/O	Artist	Song	Votes			Place
R/O	Artist	Song	Press Jury (weight 50%)	Public (weight 50%)	Total	Place
1	Maldestro	"Canzone per Federica"	28.13%	18.38%	23.25%	2
2	Tommaso Pini	"Cose che danno ansia"	25.35%	17.25%	21.30%	3
3	Valeria Farinacci	"Insieme"	14.92%	20.27%	17.60%	4
4	Lele	"Ora mai"	31.60%	44.10%	37.85%	1

=== Fourth evening ===
In this evening all 20 songs remaining were performed again. The scores from the previous evenings are not counted for this evening. The last four songs in the combined votes of the televote (40%), poll (30%) and the expert jury (30%) were eliminated. Also, the winner of the 4 remaining songs in the Newcomers section was determined.

Big Artists

Eliminated

R/O	Artist	Song	Votes				Place
R/O	Artist	Song	Opinions poll (weight 30%)	Press jury (weight 30%)	Public (weight 40%)	Total	Place
1	Ron	"L'ottava meraviglia"	2.60%	1.25%	3.04%	2.37%	19
2	Chiara Galiazzo	"Nessun posto è casa mia"	3.70%	5.00%	3.09%	3.84%	11
3	Samuel	"Vedrai"	5.10%	6.25%	2.23%	4.30%	9
4	Al Bano	"Di rose e di spine"	2.67%	0.00%	5.61%	3.04%	17
5	Ermal Meta	"Vietato morire"	6.35%	10.00%	6.50%	7.51%	4
6	Michele Bravi	"Il diario degli errori"	4.62%	15.00%	13.04%	11.10%	2
7	Fiorella Mannoia	"Che sia benedetta"	14.55%	10.00%	10.55%	11.59%	1
8	Clementino	"Ragazzi fuori"	2.70%	6.25%	3.80%	4.20%	10
9	Lodovica Comello	"Il cielo non mi basta"	3.12%	2.50%	5.27%	3.79%	12
10	Gigi D'Alessio	"La prima stella"	2.22%	0.00%	5.63%	2.92%	18
11	Paola Turci	"Fatti bella per te"	7.72%	8.75%	3.27%	6.25%	5
12	Marco Masini	"Spostato di un secondo"	4.23%	3.75%	3.43%	3.76%	13
13	Francesco Gabbani	"Occidentali's karma"	8.65%	6.87%	7.38%	7.61%	3
14	Michele Zarrillo	"Mani nelle mani"	3.40%	3.75%	2.91%	3.31%	15
15	Bianca Atzei	"Ora esisti solo tu"	4.83%	3.13%	6.57%	5.02%	7
16	Sergio Sylvestre	"Con te"	6.81%	3.75%	3.96%	4.75%	8
17	Elodie	"Tutta colpa mia"	5.65%	1.25%	3.16%	3.34%	14
18	Fabrizio Moro	"Portami via"	6.03%	6.87%	5.27%	5.98%	6
19	Giusy Ferreri	"Fa talmente male"	3.37%	1.88%	1.75%	2.27%	20
20	Alessio Bernabei	"Nel mezzo di un applauso"	1.68%	3.75%	3.54%	3.05%	16

Newcomers

Winner

Performances of the contestants of the Newcomers' Artists section on the fourth evening
R/O	Artist	Song	Votes				Place
R/O	Artist	Song	Opinions poll (weight 30%)	Press Jury (weight 30%)	Public (weight 40%)	Total	Place
1	Leonardo La Macchia	"Ciò che resta"	20.34%	25.00%	13.18%	18.87%	4
2	Lele	"Ora mai"	27.00%	31.25%	51.96%	38.26%	1
3	Maldestro	"Canzone per Federica"	22.83%	31.25%	13.67%	21.69%	2
4	Francesco Guasti	"Universo"	29.83%	12.50%	21.19%	21.18%	3

=== Fifth evening ===
On the final evening all 16 remaining songs in the Big Artists section were performed and a winner was determined.

Big Artists – Final – First Round

Advanced to second round

R/O	Artist	Song	Votes				Place
R/O	Artist	Song	Expert Jury (weight 30%)	Opinion Poll (weight 30%)	Public (weight 40%)	Total	Place
1	Elodie	"Tutta colpa mia"	3.13%	6.78%	5.99%	5.37%	8
2	Michele Zarrillo	"Mani nelle mani"	3.13%	3.80%	3.49%	3.48%	11
3	Sergio Sylvestre	"Con te"	3.13%	7.30%	8.10%	6.37%	6
4	Fiorella Mannoia	"Che sia benedetta"	15.00%	15.05%	12.73%	14.11%	1
5	Fabrizio Moro	"Portami via"	4.38%	5.98%	7.94%	6.28%	7
6	Alessio Bernabei	"Nel mezzo di un applauso"	3.75%	2.02%	3.21%	3.01%	15
7	Marco Masini	"Spostato di un secondo"	2.50%	4.15%	3.63%	3.45%	13
8	Paola Turci	"Fatti bella per te"	13.75%	9.80%	4.15%	8.72%	5
9	Bianca Atzei	"Ora esisti solo tu"	1.88%	6.02%	7.26%	5.27%	9
10	Francesco Gabbani	"Occidentali's Karma"	9.38%	11.88%	14.37%	12.13%	2
11	Chiara Galiazzo	"Nessun posto è casa mia"	3.75%	3.68%	2.21%	3.11%	14
12	Clementino	"Ragazzi fuori"	3.13%	2.55%	2.69%	2.78%	16
13	Ermal Meta	"Vietato morire"	13.75%	7.72%	7.63%	9.49%	3
14	Lodovica Comello	"Il cielo non mi basta"	3.13%	3.18%	3.89%	3.45%	12
15	Samuel	"Vedrai"	5.63%	5.42%	2.11%	4.16%	10
16	Michele Bravi	"Il diaro degli errori"	10.63%	4.67%	10.59%	8.82%	4

Big Artists – Final – Second Round

Winner
Second place
Third place

R/O	Artist	Song	Votes				Place
R/O	Artist	Song	Expert Jury (weight 30%)	Opinion Poll (weight 30%)	Public (weight 40%)	Total	Place
1	Fiorella Mannoia	"Che sia benedetta"	27.08%	37.89%	33.21%	32.78%	2
2	Ermal Meta	"Vietato morire"	43.75%	28.61%	23.10%	30.95%	3
3	Francesco Gabbani	"Occidentali's Karma"	29.17%	33.50%	43.69%	36.27%	1

== Special guests ==
The special guests of Sanremo Music Festival 2017 were:

- Singers / musicians: Anne-Marie, Alvaro Soler, Beppe Vessicchio, Carmen Consoli, Davide Rossi, Giorgia, Karen Harding, LP, Mika, Mina, Peppe Vessicchio, Rag'n'Bone Man, Ricky Martin, Robbie Williams, Robin Schulz, Tiziano Ferro, Zucchero Fornaciari.
- Bands / music groups: Clean Bandit, Biffy Clyro, Ladri di carrozzelle, Recycled Orchestra of Cateura (Paraguay), Piccolo Coro dell'Antoniano.
- Actors / comedians / models : Alessandra Mastronardi, Alessandro Gassman, Antonio Albanese, Diana del Bufalo, Flavio Insinna, Gabriele Cirilli, Geppi Cucciari, Giusy Buscemi, Keanu Reeves, Luca Bizzarri, Luca Zingaretti, Marco Giallini, Paola Cortellesi, Paolo Kessisoglu, Raoul Bova, Rocio Muñoz Morales, Virginia Raffaele, Ubaldo Pantani.
- Athletes: Francesco Totti, Marco Cusin, Valentina Diouf.
- Other notable figures: Antonella Clerici, Diletta Leotta, Kitonb, Gaetano Moscato, Hiroki Hara, Maria Pollacci, Stev Otten.

== Related shows ==
=== Prima Festival ===
Federico Russo, Tess Masazza, Herbert Ballerina present Prima Festival 2017, a small show on air on Rai 1 immediately after TG1. The show features details, curiosities and news relating to Sanremo Music Festival 2017.

=== Dopo Festival ===
Nicola Savino, Gialappa's Band and Ubaldo Pantani are the presenters of Dopo Festival 2017, a talk show on air on Rai 1 immediately after Sanremo Music Festival. The show features comments about the televised song contest with the participation of singers and journalists.

== Broadcast and ratings ==
=== Local broadcast ===
Rai 1, Rai 4, Rai Radio 1 and Rai Radio 2 are the official broadcasters of the festival in Italy. The show is also available in streaming on the RaiPlay website.

==== Ratings Sanremo Music Festival 2017 ====
The audience is referred to the one of Rai 1.

Live Show	Timeslot (UTC+1)	Date	1st time (9.00pm – 0.00am)		2nd time (0.00am – 1.00am)		Overall audience	
Live Show	Timeslot (UTC+1)	Date	Viewers	Share (%)	Viewers	Share (%)	Viewers	Share (%)
1st	9:00 pm	February 7	13,176,000	50.10	6,212,000	52.02	11,374,000	50.37
2nd	9:00 pm	February 8	11,708,000	46.04	5,826,000	50.06	10,367,000	46.60
3rd	9:00 pm	February 9	12,751,000	49.74	5,418,000	49.35	10,420,000	49.70
4th	9:00 pm	February 10	11,674,000	45.68	6,179,000	53.27	9,887,000	47.00
5th	9:00 pm	February 11	13,553,000	54.29	9,681,000	69.74	12,022,000	58.40

==== Ratings Prima Festival 2017 ====
Episode	Timeslot (UTC+1)	Date	Viewers	Share (%)
01; 02; 03; 04; 05; 06; 07; 08; 09; 10; 11	8.30 pm	January 29; January 30; February 1 February 2 February 5 February 6 February 7 February 8 February 9 February 10; February 11	4,373,000; 4,145,000; 3,615,000; 3,982,000; 3,999,000; 4,322,000; 8,039,000; 6,880,000; 7,450,000; 6,595,000; 8,194,000	17.04; 15.67; 14.27; 15.90; 15.40; 16.30; 30.05; 25.61; 27.88; 25.55; 34.50

==== Ratings Dopo Festival 2017 ====
Episode	Timeslot (UTC+1)	Date	Viewers	Share (%)
01; 02; 03; 04; 05	1.00 am	February 7 February 8 February 9 February 10; February 11	2,596,000; 2,424,000; 2,097,000; 2,943,000; 4,901,000	43.09; 40.60; 40.15; 43.77; 64.80

=== International broadcast ===
The international television service Rai Italia broadcast the competition in the Americas, Africa, Asia and Australia.

== See also ==
- Italy in the Eurovision Song Contest 2017
