= Negrita (band) =

Italian rock band

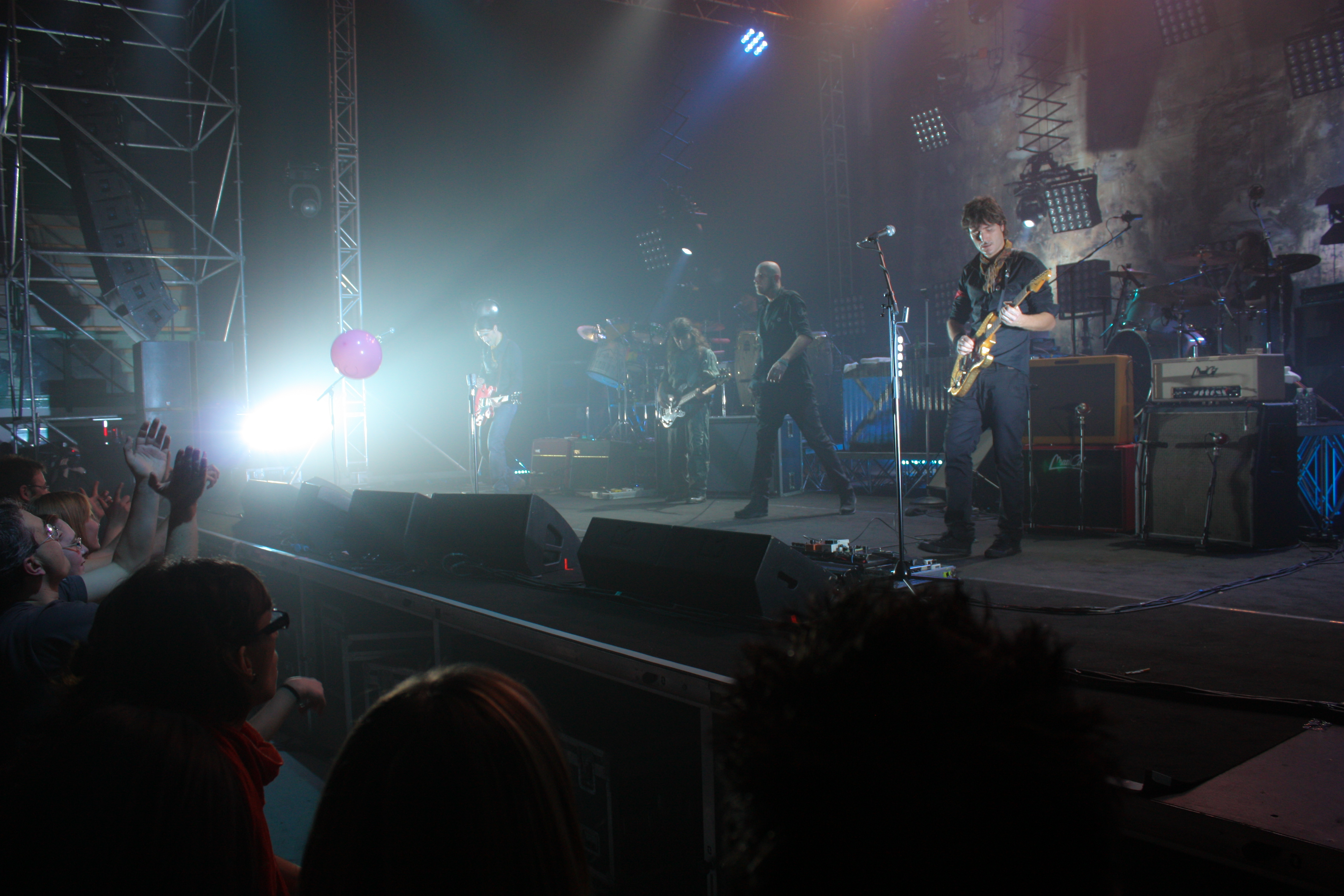
- Negrita performing in Borgo Valsugana during their HELLdorado tour in 2009

Background information
- Origin: Arezzo, Italy
- Genre: Alternative rock
- Years active: 1991–present
- Labels: Black Out, Universal
- Members: Paolo Bruni ("Pau"); Enrico Salvi ("Drigo"); Cesare "Mac" Petricich
- Past members: Roberto Zamagni ("Zama"); Franco Li Causi ("Frankie")
- Website: www.negrita.com

Negrita is an Italian rock band from Arezzo, Tuscany. Formed in 1991, the band was named after the song "Hey Negrita", included in The Rolling Stones' album Black and Blue, released in 1976. The band currently consists of Paolo Bruni (also known as "Pau"), Enrico Salvi (known as "Drigo") and Cesare "Mac" Petricich.

After recording several demos, the band's first album, Negrita, was released in 1994 by Mercury and Black Out. Up to 2014, the band had released eight studio albums, including the platinum-selling XXX in 1997, Reset in 1999 and HELLdorado in 2008. The band also released two compilation albums, Hei! Negrita in 2003 and Déjà Vu in 2013; the latter became their first album to reach the top of the Italian Albums Chart.

The band has received three nominations at the MTV Europe Music Awards for Best Italian Act in 1999, 2003 and 2005. In January 2012, their album Reset was ranked 77th in the list of the 100 Best Italian Albums of All Time compiled by the Italian version of the music magazine Rolling Stone.

== Discography ==
Studio albums

- Negrita (1994)
- Paradisi per illusi (1995)
- XXX (1997)
- Reset (1999)
- Radio Zombie (2001)
- L'uomo sogna di volare (2005)
- HELLdorado (2008)
- Dannato vivere (2011)
- 9 (2015)
- Desert Yacht Club (2018)
- "Così E' La Vita (Colonna Sonora Originale)" (2019)
- "Negrita MTV Unplugged" (2021)
- Canzoni Per Anni Spietati (2025)

Compilation albums

- Ehi! Negrita (2003)
- Déjà Vu (2013)
- "I Ragazzi Stanno Bene 1994-2019" (2019)

== Awards and nominations ==
Year	Award	Nomination	Work	Result
1999	MTV Europe Music Awards	Best Italian Act	Themselves	Nominated
2003	Italian Music Awards	Best Band	Themselves	Nominated
2003	MTV Europe Music Awards	Best Italian Act	Themselves	Nominated
2005	Premio Videoclip Italiano	Best Video by a Group	"Rotolando verso sud"	Won
2005	MTV Europe Music Awards	Best Italian Act	Themselves	Nominated
