= Bianca Atzei =

Italian singer (born 1987)

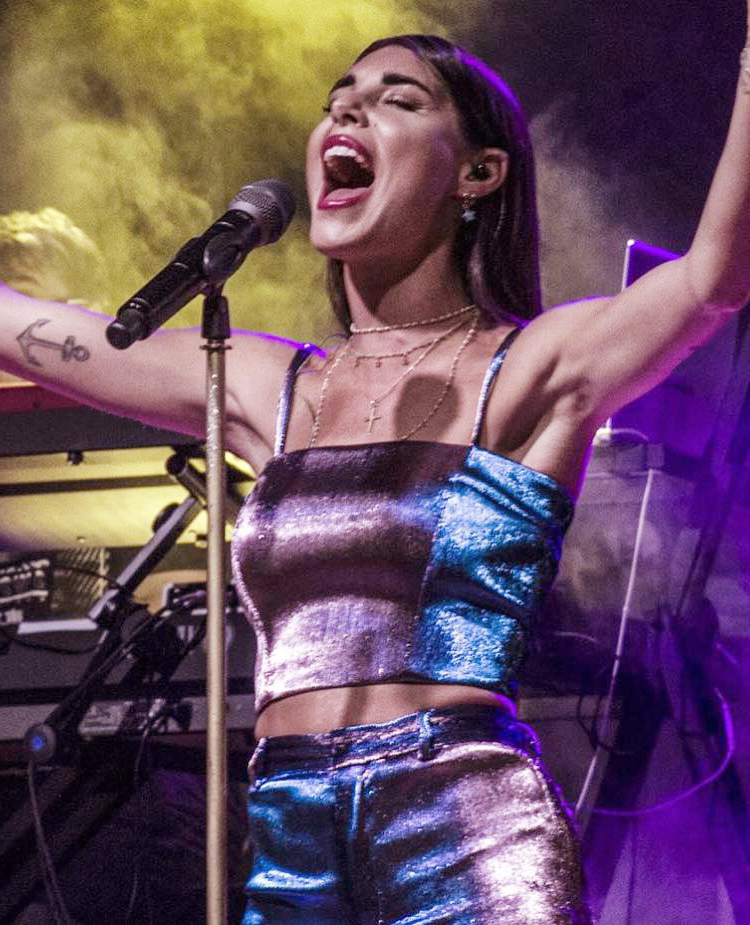
- Bianca Atzei during Bianca Atzei Live 2018, September 2018

Background information
- Born: Veronica Atzei; March 8, 1987 (age 39); Milan, Italy
- Genres: Pop; pop soul
- Occupation: Singer
- Years active: 2012–present
- Labels: Carosello; Ultrasuoni; Baraonda Edizioni Musicali
- Website: www.biancaatzei.com

Veronica Atzei (born March 8, 1987), better known by her stage name Bianca Atzei (Italian pronunciation: [ˈbjaŋka atˈtsɛi], Sardinian: [aˈtse.i]), is an Italian singer and television personality.

After the release of a few singles with Ultrasuoni between 2012 and 2014, she rose to prominence in February 2015 with her participation in the Sanremo Music Festival 2015, performing the song "Il solo al mondo". The single came before her first album, Bianco e nero, released in the same year by Baraonda Edizioni Musicali.

== Biography ==
Atzei was born in Milan to parents from Oristano. She has studied singing since she was 8 years old, listening to Whitney Houston and Mariah Carey, but she was also influenced by Italian singers from the 60s such as Luigi Tenco, Patty Pravo and Sergio Endrigo. At the age of 17 she attended for two years the MAS, a music academy in Milan, during which she had her first experiences as a singer: she contributed to the making of theme songs and jingles, also working for a period as chorister in the talent show CD Live broadcast by the national television channel Rai Due and in the TV program Domenica Cinque directed by Barbara D'Urso.

== Career ==
=== Beginnings ===
In 2012, she took part in Sanremo Social, first selection for the following edition of Sanremo Music Festival, with her very first single "La gelosia", but the song was rejected. On August 3, 2012, the single "L'amore vero" was released, which was well received on the radio and web, earning one million views on YouTube. On November 16 of the same year she released the single La gelosia, featuring the Italian pop band Modà. The following summer, she performed in with many concerts around Italy, especially in Sardinia. In 2012 she also wrote the lyrics for Folle stronza with Diego Calvetti, featured in the third album of Loredana Errore titled Pioggia di comete.

In 2013, Bianca tried to participate in the Sanremo Music Festival in the section Nuove proposte with the song "Arido", but it was rejected. With Niccolò Agliardi she sang "Fino in fondo", published on May 2, and the collaboration with Kekko Silvestre continued: the frontman of Modà was the writer of Bianca's summer's hit "La paura che ho di perderti", published on July 4, 2013, certified by FIMI as a gold record, thanks to the sale of more than 15,000 copies. With it, she took part in the Coca-Cola Summer Festival in Piazza del Popolo in Rome (broadcast by the Italian Canale 5), qualifying in the finals. After the summer tour in Sardinia, in autumn she opened the concerts of Modà's tour. On October 1, 2013, the album by the Italian singer Gianni Morandi Bisogna vivere was published, with the song "Ti porto al mare", realized in collaboration with Bianca. On October 8 she performed at the Verona Arena the song "In amore" with Morandi in one of the two concerts of Gianni Morandi – Live in Arena. In December 2013, she publishes the single "One Day I'll Fly Away", cover of Randy Crawford's song, realized as part of the soundtrack of the mini series Anna Karenina, broadcast by the Italian national television network Rai Uno, inspired by the novel written by Lev Tolstoj. On December 24, 2013, she performed the song "La paura che ho di perderti" at the Concerto di Natale (Christmas Concert) in the Auditorium della Conciliazione in Rome, broadcast by the Italian television network Rai Due.

In 2014, with Alex Britti, she tried to take part in the Sanremo Music Festival 2015 in the section Big with the song "Non è vero mai" which was rejected, the song would be published as single on March 14. In July she took part again in the Coca-Cola Summer Festival singing "Non puoi chiamarlo amore", published on June 23, after that she started recording her first studio album. On September 14, during the wedding between Elisabetta Canalis and Brian Perri she sang a version of Ave Maria in Sardinian language.

=== Sanremo Music Festival 2015 and Bianco e nero ===
In February 2015, Bianca participated in the 65th Sanremo Music Festival, performing the song "Il solo al mondo", written by Kekko Silvestre; she was ranked 14th. During the four-night festival she was dressed by the stylist Antonio Marras, who designed Bianca's four different dresses. On February 12, the third, cover-themed night of the Festival, she sang "Ciao amore, ciao" by the Italian singer Luigi Tenco, mixed by Alex Britti. On the same day, she released her first album Bianco e nero, including 20 tracks and many of her previous publications. Her cover of "Ciao amore, ciao" was published as the second single of the album on April 13, 2015.

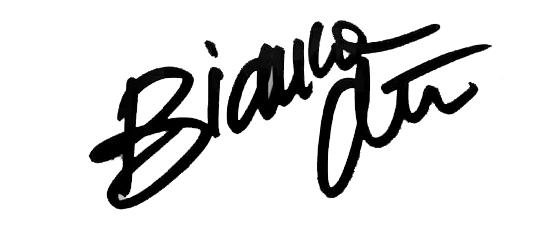
Bianca Atzei's signature

In June 2015 Bianca participated in the third edition of Coca-Cola Summer Festival performing "Ciao amore, ciao" featuring Britti. A new single, extract of Bianco e nero, was released on June 24, "In un giorno di sole", getting two nomination for the Premio RTL 102.5 – Canzone dell'estate (RTL 102.5 Award – Summer Hit).

On September 22 she released the fourth single from Bianco e nero, titled "Riderai". Less than a month later, on October 15, her featuring song "Torna a Surriento" with Gigi D'Alessio, is announced, from his new album Malaterra. On October 25, she opens Francesco De Gregori' s concert at Expo 2015. She sings with Italian rapper J-Ax the new version of his song "Intro", published on November 27 and collected in his new album Il bello di esser brutti Multiplatinum Edition.

In 2016 Bianca collaborated with two notable colleagues: with Loredana Bertè, on the duet "Così ti scrivo" and on the choral track "Amici non-ne ho... ma amiche sì", both collected in her album Amici non-ne ho... ma amiche sì!, and with Ron on the duet "Per questa notte che cade giù" and on the choral track "Una città per cantare", both collected in his album La forza di dire sì. On March 13, 2016, she sang a cover of the famous song "Amor mio" by Mina during the show Una serata bella per te, Mogol (broadcast by the Italian Rete 4). On June 17 is out the fifth single from Bianco e nero, "La strada per la felicità (Laura)".

From September 16 until October 28, 2016, she was an entrant of Tale e quale show, a talent show directed by Carlo Conti and broadcast by Rai Uno. Ranked eighth, she qualified for the next part of the show Tale e quale show – Il torneo broadcast from November 11–24.

On December 7 she performed during the traditional ceremony for the Christmas tree lighting with the Little Choir of Antoniano, in Milan; the event was broadcast by RTL 102.5 TV and, delayed, by DeA Junior.

=== Ora esisti solo tu and Sanremo Music Festival 2017 ===
On December 12 was made official her participation in 67th Sanremo Music Festival with the song "Ora esisti solo tu". She classified for the finale and ranked 9th. During the four-night festival she was dress by Antonio Marras. On May 8 the song is certified by FIMI as a gold record, thanks to the sale of more than 25,000 copies. On May 12 is released her new single Abbracciami perdonami gli sbagli meanwhile it's also published her first book Ora esisti solo tu – Una storia d'amore edited by Mursia. The book preview has been hosted at NonostanteMarras, the atelier of her friend and stylist Antonio Marras. On May 12, in Nova Gorica began the Bianca Atzei Live 2017, a summer tour that included more than 30 Italian cities.

Since November 17 Bianca is included again in the cast of Tale e quale show – Il torneo.

On January 4, 2018, she confirmed her participation in the Italian program L'Isola dei Famosi, the Italian version of Celebrity Survivor, which has been broadcast since January 22 by Canale 5.

On January 26, 2018, is released her new single Fire On Ice.

== Discography ==
=== Albums ===
Year	Title	Sales certification (FIMI)
2015	Bianco e nero	15

=== Singles ===
Year	Title	Ranking FIMI	Certification FIMI	Album of origin
2012	La gelosia	—		/
2012	L'amore vero	52		/
2012	La gelosia (feat. Modà)	33		/
2013	Fino in fondo (feat. Niccolò Agliardi)	—		/
2013	La paura che ho di perderti	37	Gold	/
2013	One Day I'll Fly Away	85		/
2014	Non è vero mai (feat. Alex Britti)	37		/
2014	Non puoi chiamarlo amore	—		/
2015	Il solo al mondo	68		Bianco e nero
2015	Ciao amore, ciao (feat. Alex Britti)	—		Bianco e nero
2015	In un giorno di sole	—		Bianco e nero
2015	Riderai (New version)	—		Bianco e nero
2016	La strada per la felicità (Laura)	—		Bianco e nero
2017	Ora esisti solo tu	21	Gold	
2017	Abbracciami perdonami gli sbagli	—		

== Collaborations ==
- 2013 – Fino in Fondo (with Niccolò Agliardi)
- 2013 – Ti Porto Al Mare (with Gianni Morandi)
- 2015 – Intro (with J-Ax)
- 2015 – Torna a Surriento (with Gigi D'Alessio)
- 2016 – Amici Non Ne Ho (with Loredana Bertè)
- 2016 – Così Ti Scrivo (with Loredana Bertè)
- 2016 – Una Città Per Cantare (with Ron)
- 2016 – Per Questa Notte Che Cade Giù (with Ron)
- 2016 – Amici non-ne ho (con Loredana Bertè in Amiche in Arena CD)
- 2016 – Quello che le donne non-dicono (con Loredana Bertè in Amiche in Arena CD)
- 2016 – Così ti scrivo (with Loredana Bertè in Amiche in Arena CD)

== Tour ==
- 2014 – Bianca Atzei tour 2014
- 2015/16 – Bianco e nero Club
- 2016 – Bianco e nero Live
- 2016 – Bianca Atzei Live 2017

=== Hosted at other singers tour ===
- 2013 – Gioia Tour by Modà (opening act)
- 2013 – Live in Arena by Gianni Morandi
- 2014 – Modà Stadi by Modà
- 2014 – Cuore e Vento by Modà
- 2015 – A volte esagero Live by Gianluca Grignani
- 2015 – Giusy Ferreri Tour 2015 by Giusy Ferreri
- 2016 – Finalmente piove Live Tour by Valerio Scanu
- 2016 – Amiche in Arena by Loredana Bertè
- 2018 – Gianni Morandi in concerto all’Arena di Verona by Gianni Morandi

== Author for other singers ==
- 2012 – Folle stronza for Loredana Errore (lyrics: Veronica Atzei, Diego Calvetti – music: Diego Calvetti) published in Pioggia di comete, 2012
- 2016 – Io e te for Dear Jack (lyrics: Veronica Atzei, Oscar Angiuli – music:), published in Mezzo respiro, 2016

== Sanremo Music Festival ==
Year	Category	Song	Featuring (track)	Places
2015	Big	"Il solo al mondo"	"Ciao amore, ciao"	14th
2017	Big	"Ora esisti solo tu"	"Con il nastro rosa"	9th

== Television ==
- CD Live (Rai 2, 2005–2007) – chorister
- Domenica Cinque (Canale 5, 2009–2010) – chorister
- Tale e quale show 6 (Rai 1, 2016) – competitor
- Tale e quale show – Il torneo 5 (Rai 1, 2016) – competitor
- Tale e quale show – Il torneo 6 (Rai 1, 2017) – competitor
- L'isola dei famosi 13 (Canale 5, 2018) – competitor

== Awards ==
- 2014 – Premio Mia Martini giovani
- 2015 – Premio Navicella "I Sardi nel mondo"
- 2015 – Premio Barocco
- 2015 – Premio penisola sorrentina
- 2018 – Premio penisola sorrentina "Artista dell’anno"
