= Sottovuoto generazionale =

Sottovuoto Generazionale

Studio album by Dari
- Released: September 12, 2008
- Genres: Pop punk, electropunk, electronic rock
- Length: 61:08
- Label: EMI

Dari chronology
LoveGain (2007)	Sottovuoto Generazionale (2008)	Sottovuoto: D-Version (2009)

Sottovuoto generazionale is a debut album by Dari. Two singles have been released, Wale (tanto wale) and Tutto regolare.

The CD sold about 20000 copies.

== Track listing ==
1. Wale (Tanto Wale)
2. Tutto Regolare
3. Predisposta (A Lasciare il Tuo Posto)
4. Come M'Hai
5. Per Piacere
6. Cambio Destinazione
7. Non Pensavo
8. GP A 100 All'Ora
9. Moltiplicato 10
10. Ho Spaccato
11. Minimale Maxibene
12. Play and Stop

All tracks except 2, 3 and 12 are re-recordings of older songs.
