= Giulia Luzi =

Italian actress and singer

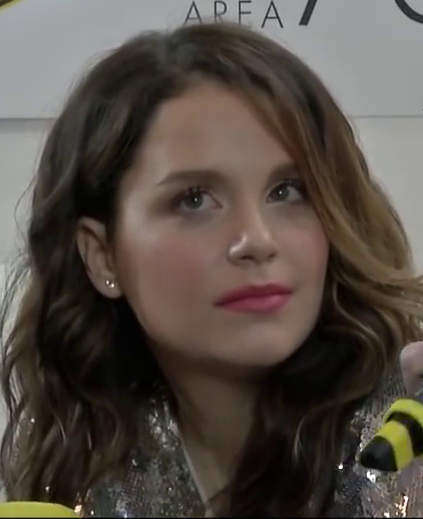
- Born: January 3, 1994 (age 32); Rome, Italy
- Occupations: Actress; singer

Giulia Luzi (born 3 January 1994) is an Italian actress, singer, and dubbing voice actor. She was born in Rome, Lazio, Italy.

Luzi is best known for her recurring role in the Italian television series I Cesaroni and for playing 'Giulietta' in the Italian language premiere of Roméo et Juliette (musical) titled 'Romeo e Giulietta: Ama e Cambia Il Mondo'. She also did the dubbing for the voice of Miley Cyrus in the television series Hannah Montana on Italian television. She is also known for singing the theme song for the television series Un Medico in Famiglia.

== Biography ==
At the age of nine he began to study singing with teacher Rossella Ruini, since 2005 with Maria Cristina Brancucci, since 2014 with Voice Trainer Roberto delli Carri.

In 2004, she was chosen by maestro Ernesto Brancucci to voice Disney: her early work included dubbing Miley Cyrus in Hannah Montana, then The Polar Express (film), Ice Age 2, Winnie the Pooh and the Elephants, The Little Mermaid: When It All Began and LazyTown. In 2005, Luzi made her voice acting debut for a non-singing role in the horror film The Descent.

In 2006 she made her Television acting debut with the series I Cesaroni, in which she played the role of Jolanda Bellavista, best friend and confidante of Alice (Micol Olivieri), and twin sister of Gian Maria a.k.a. “Budino,” whom she also plays in subsequent seasons. In 2007, she performs some songs from the film Enchanted (film). In 2009, she is in the cast from the sixth to the eighth season of the Rai 1 series Un medico in famiglia, in which, in addition to playing the role of Giulia Biancofiore, she sings the opening theme song (the song Je t'aime written by Emiliano Palmieri and Anna Muscionico).

In 2011 she played some songs for the film The Muppets (2011 film) and released her first album Amica Nemica on the Cinevox label. In September 2012 she was on the set of Ferdinando Vicentini Orgnani's new film Vinodentro, starring Vincenzo Amato and Giovanna Mezzogiorno.

On Oct. 2 and 3, 2013, she made her Verona Arena debut in Roméo et Juliette (musical) the World in the role of Juliet, produced by David Zard and directed by Giuliano Peparini, the first leg of a five-year tour that has totaled more than 500 performances and more than 850,000 stops, touching on some of them abroad.

From Sept. 11 to Nov. 20, 2015, she was a contestant on the program Tale e quale show, hosted by Carlo Conti on Rai 1, finishing third and winning the right to participate in the Tournament of the next edition.

He participated as a singer in the New Year's Eve party with Gigi D'Alessio, broadcast on Canale 5, to look forward to 2016, and the next one in 2017.

In February 2017, he participated in the 67th Sanremo Music Festival 2017 with the song Togliamoci la voglia paired with Raige.

Let's Take It Off is also the title of his second album. The song Parachute is extracted as the second single.

In the fall of 2019, as far as her recording career is concerned, she changed her stage name simply to GIULIA and released the electronic-sounding single Rio, of which she co-wrote with Celeste Gaia.

In 2020, Giulia collaborates with Samuel Storm as a songwriter on the summer single Mon Amour, and in October of the same year she released the single Prescindere da te. Also in 2020, she takes part in the Oscar-nominated animated film “Over The Moon - The Amazing World of Lunaria,” lending her voice in singing to the protagonist Fei Fei.
