= Marianne Mirage =

Italian singer-songwriter (born 1989)

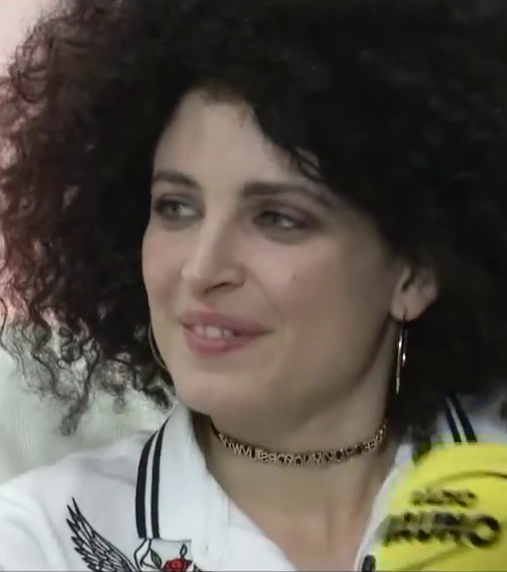
- Marianne Mirage in 2017

Background information
- Born: October 19, 1989 (age 36); Cesena, Italy
- Occupations: Singer; songwriter
- Years active: 2016–present
- Label: Sugar
- Website: yogamirage.com

Giovanna Gardelli (born 19 October 1989), known by her pseudonym Marianne Mirage, is an Italian singer-songwriter who composes in English, French and Italian.

== Biography ==
Majored in Literature and Philosophy at the University of Bologna, she honed her acting skills at the Centro Sperimentale di Cinematografia, where she won a scholarship.

Mirage's first debut album Quelli come me was released on 25 March 2016, followed by a tour. Two songs from the album were later released as singles: "Game Over" and "La Vie". With the latter, she participated in the fourth edition of Summer Festival.

Mirage took part in the newcomers section of the Sanremo Music Festival 2017 with the song "Le canzoni fanno male", written by Kaballà and Francesco Bianconi, but was eliminated on the night of her performance. On 10 February 2017, the eponymous EP Le canzoni fanno male was released.

In October 2017, she released the song "The Place", which served as the theme for the film of the same name directed by Paolo Genovese. The song, released in both Italian and English versions, was written by Mirage herself with STAG.

== Discography ==
- 2016 – Quelli come me
- 2019 – Vite private
- 2021 – Mirage
- 2025 – Teatro

=== EPs ===
- 2017 – Le canzoni fanno male

=== Singles ===
- 2014 – "L'amore non c'era adesso c'è / Boum"
- 2014 – "Come quando fuori piove"
- 2014 – "Jingle Bell Rock"
- 2016 – "Lo so cosa fai" (feat. Elijah Hook)
- 2016 – "Game Over"
- 2016 – "La Vie" (Takagi & Ketra Remix)
- 2017 – "Le canzoni fanno male"
- 2017 – "In tutte le cose"
- 2017 – "The Place" (The Place OST)
- 2018 – "Copacabana Copacabana"
- 2019 – "L'amore è finito"
- 2021 – "Vulnerabili" (Live at Get Loud Studio)
- 2024 – "Chiudi gli occhi"
- 2024 – "Venere"
- 2024 – "Due anime"

== Tours ==
- 2025 – Teatro tour 2025
