= Sergio Sylvestre =

American-born singer, based in Italy (born 1990)

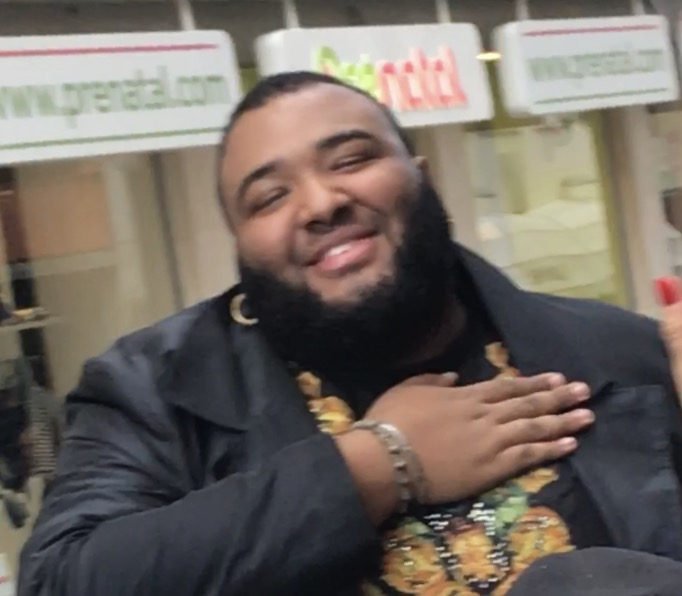
- Sergio Sylvestre

Background information
- Born: Sergiofeld Sylvestre; 5 December 1990 (age 35); Los Angeles, California
- Genres: R&B; soul
- Occupation: Singer
- Instrument: Vocals
- Years active: 2016–present
- Label: Columbia

Sergio Sylvestre (born 5 December 1990) is an American-born singer, based in Italy. After moving to Italy, Sylvestre rose to fame winning the 15th series of Italian talent show Amici di Maria De Filippi. His debut extended play, Big Boy, topped the charts in Italy and was certified gold by the Federation of the Italian Music Industry. In 2017, Sylvestre competed in the 67th Sanremo Music Festival and performed "Con te", a song co-written by Giorgia, which was included in his self-titled debut album.

== Biography ==
Sergio Sylvestre was born in Los Angeles to a Mexican mother and a Haitian father. In 2012, Sylvestre visited Southern Italy as a tourist. He later decided to move to Salento, and became the singer of the band Samsara Beach in Gallipoli.

Between 2015 and 2016, Sylvestre rose to fame as a contestant of the 15th series of Italian talent show Amici di Maria De Filippi, eventually becoming the series' winner, beating runner-up Elodie. In May 2016, Sylvestre released his debut extended play, Big Boy, composed of four new songs and four cover versions of international hits. Big Boy reached the top spot of the Italian Albums Chart, and was later certified gold by the Federation of the Italian Music Industry. The single with same name was also certified gold in Italy. In Autumn 2016, Sylvestre should have embarked on the Big Boy Live Tour, including ten concerts throughout Italy, but the tour was later canceled due to other projects. He later recorded the song "Prego", Italian end credit version of the song "You're welcome", in a duet with Italian rapper Rocco Hunt, featured on the soundtrack of Oceania, the Italian version of the animated film Moana.

In February 2017, Sylvestre competed in the Big Artists section of the 67th Sanremo Music Festival, performing the song "Con te", co-written by Italian singer-songwriter Giorgia. The song was included in his first, self-titled, full-length album which was released in Italy on 10 February 2017. On 17 November, of the same year, Sylvestre released his first Christmas album, titled Big Christmas.

== Discography ==
=== Studio albums ===
List of studio albums, with chart positions and certifications
Title	Album details	Peak chart positions
Title	Album details	ITA
Sergio Sylvestre	Released: 10 February 2017; Label: Sony Music Italy; Formats: CD, download, streaming	10
Big Christmas	Released: 17 November 2017; Label: Sony Music Italy; Formats: Download, streaming	47

=== Extended plays ===
List of studio albums, with chart positions and certifications
Title	EP details	Peak chart positions		Certifications
Title	EP details	ITA	SWI	Certifications
Big Boy	Released: 20 May 2016; Label: Columbia; Formats: CD, download, streaming	1	46	FIMI: Gold

=== Singles ===
==== As lead artist ====
List of singles, with chart positions, album name and certifications
Single	Year	Peak chart positions	Certifications	Album or EP
Single	Year	ITA	Certifications	Album or EP
"Big Boy"	2016	19	FIMI: Gold	Big Boy
"Ashes"	2016	—		Big Boy
"No Goodbye"	2016	—		Big Boy
"Con te"	2017	13	FIMI: Gold	Sergio Sylvestre
"Planes"	2017	—		Sergio Sylvestre
"Turn It Up"	2017	—		Non-album single
"—" denotes singles that did not chart or were not released.

==== As featured artist ====
List of singles as featured artist, with album name
Single	Year	Album or EP
"In the Town" (Gabry Ponte featuring Sergio Sylvestre)	2017	Non-album singles
"Victorious" (The Exss featuring Sergio Sylvestre)	2018	Non-album singles

=== Other charted songs ===
List of other charted songs, with chart positions and album name
Single	Year	Peak chart positions	Album
Single	Year	ITA	Album
"Oh Happy Day"	2021	58	Big Christmas

=== Other appearances ===
List of other album appearances
Contribution	Year	Album
"Prego" (with Rocco Hunt)	2016	Oceania (Colonna sonora originale)
"L'Italia per me" (J-Ax & Fedez featuring Sergio Sylvestre)	2017	Comunisti col Rolex
"Under the Bridge" (Pang! featuring Sergio Sylvestre)	2017	Non-album track
"The Blind Man Story" (Boomdabash featuring Sergio Sylvestre)	2018	Barracuda

Awards and achievements
Preceded by The Kolors	Amici di Maria De Filippi; Winner; 2016	Succeeded by Incumbent
