= Maldestro =

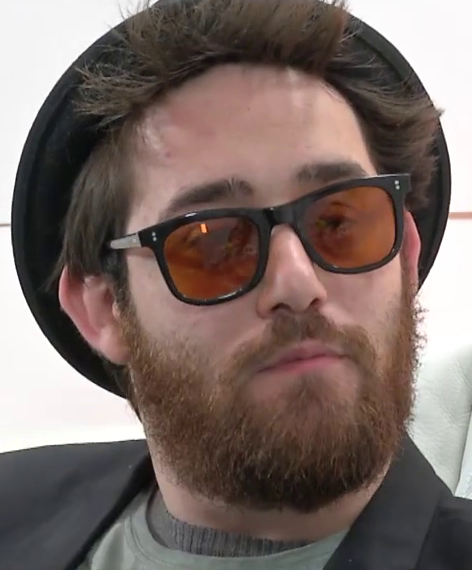
- Maldestro in 2017

Background information
- Born: Antonio Prestieri; March 11, 1985 (age 41); Naples, Italy
- Genres: Folk pop
- Years active: 2013–present
- Labels: Arealive; Warner Music Italy

Antonio Prestieri (born March 11, 1985), known professionally as Maldestro (Italian for "clumsy"), is an Italian singer and songwriter.

== Biography ==
Maldestro began studying piano at a very young age, but during his adolescence he approached the theatre. From that moment on, he devoted himself completely to acting, directing and dramaturgy. He wrote more than fifteen plays and has won numerous awards and recognitions.

In 2013 he began publishing songs including "Sopra al tetto del comune" (Above the town hall's roof) and "Dimmi come ti posso amare" (Tell me how I can love you), songs which earned him numerous awards, including Ciampi, De André, SIAE, AFI, Palco Libero and Musicultura Awards, between 2013 and 2014. They were later used in his first album Non trovo le parole (Can't find words), published on April 14, 2015. This album gained the second prize at Targa Tenco as best debut album. Maldestro has also been included in the Club Tenco album dedicated to De André.

In 2017, Maldestro competed in the Sanremo Music Festival with the song "Canzone per Federica" (Song for Federica), finishing second among the "Newcomers" and winning the Critics' Award of the Italian Song Festival "Mia Martini" for that section, the Lunezia Award, the Jannacci Award, the Assomusica Award and the Best Videoclip Award.

On March 24, 2017, Maldestro published his second album, I muri di Berlino (Berlin's walls). In this album there is, among others, the song "Abbi cura di te" (Take care of yourself), which is in the soundtrack of the film Beata Ignoranza (Blissful ignorance).

On November 9, 2018, he released his third album of unreleased works: Mia madre odia tutti gli uomini (My mother hates all men). The album, released by Arealive with the distribution of Warner Music, was anticipated by the single "Spine" (Thorns).

== Discography ==
=== Studio albums ===
- Non trovo le parole (Can't find words) (2015)
- I muri di Berlino (Berlin's walls) (2017)
- Acustic Solo Live (2018)
- Mia madre odia tutti gli uomini (My mother hates all men) (2018)

=== Singles ===
- "Sopra il tetto del comune" (Above the town hall's roof) (2013)
- "Dimmi come ti posso amare" (Tell me how I can love you) (2013)
- "Canzone per Federica" (Song for Federica) (2017)
- "Abbi cura di te" (Take care of yourself) (2017)
- "Tutto quello che ci resta" (All we have left) (2017)
- "Arrivederci allora" (Goodbye then) (2018)
- "Le mani di Maria" (Maria's hands) (2018)
- "Spine" (Thorns) (2018)
- "La felicità" (Happiness) (2018)
