= Follya =

Italian pop band

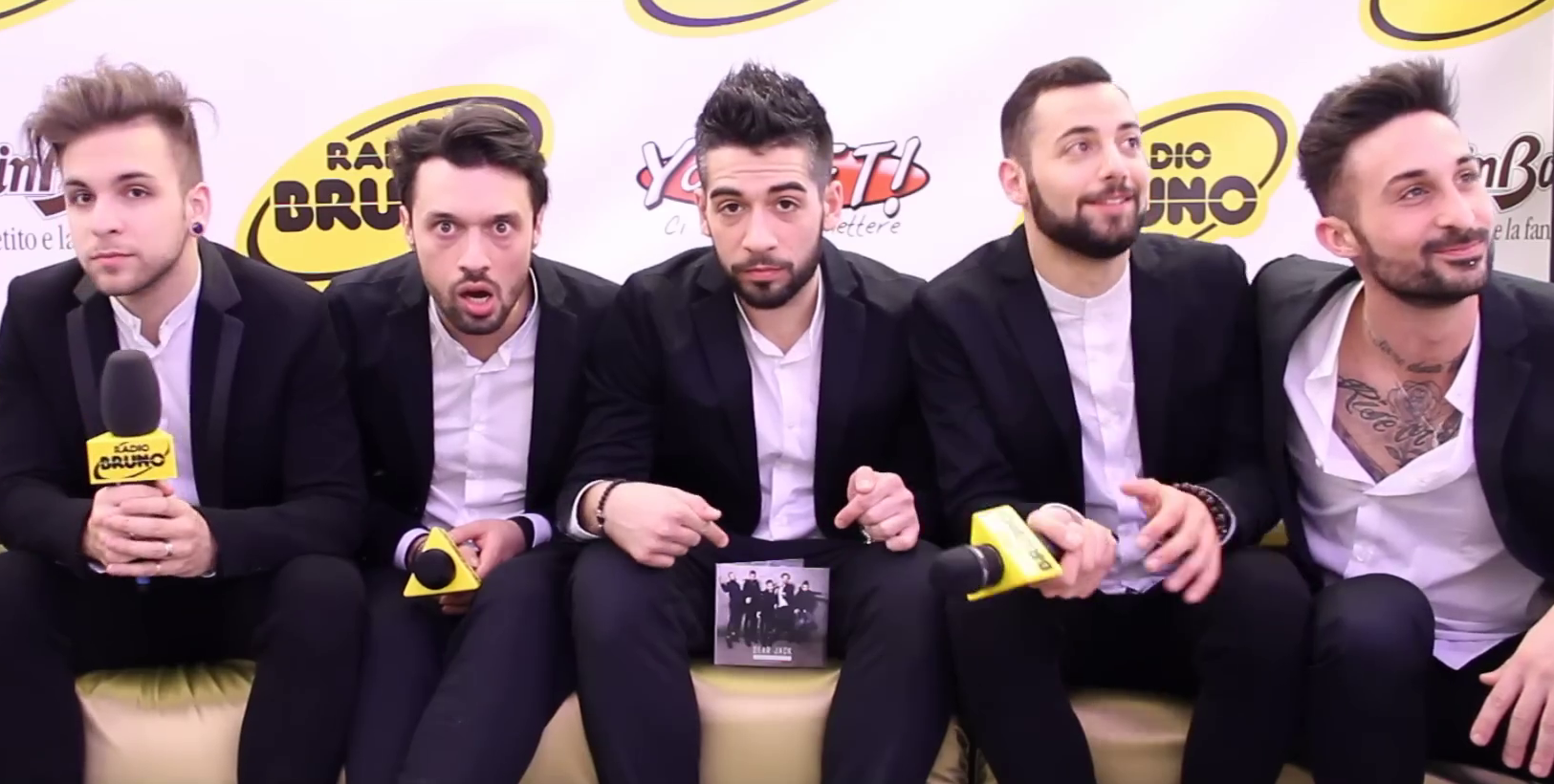
- The band in 2015

Background information
- Origin: Rome, Italy
- Genres: Pop; pop rock
- Years active: 2012–present
- Members: Alessio Bernabei; Alessandro Presti; Riccardo Ruiu
- Past members: Lorenzo Cantarini; Francesco Pierozzi; Leiner Riflessi

Follya, previously known as Dear Jack, is an Italian pop rock band formed in 2012.

They ended up second in the thirteenth edition of the Italian talent show Amici di Maria De Filippi and debuted in 2014 with the album Domani è un altro film (prima parte), which peaked at number 1 of the FIMI's album chart and was certified double platinum in Italy. They participated twice at the Sanremo Music Festival in 2015, with the song "Il mondo esplode tranne noi", and in 2016, with the song "Mezzo respiro".

In 2015, lead singer Alessio Bernabei left the band to pursue a solo career, and was replaced by Leiner Reflessi (2015–2017) and by guitarist Lorenzo Cantarini (since 2017).

In 2022, the band reunited under the front man Alessio Bernabei, without Cantarini, and changed their name to Follya.

== Members ==
- Alessio Bernabei – vocals (2012-2015) (2022-now)
- Alessandro Presti – bass guitar (2013-present)
- Riccardo Ruiu – drums (2013-present)

=== Former members ===
- Lorenzo Cantarini – vocals (2017-2022), guitar (2013-2022)
- Leiner Riflessi – vocals (2015-2017)
- Francesco Pierozzi – guitar (2012-2024)

== Discography ==
=== Studio albums ===
- As Dear Jack -

- Domani è un altro film (prima parte) (2014)
- Domani è un altro film (seconda parte) (2015)
- Mezzo respiro (2016)
- Non è un caso se... (2018)

- As Follya -

- FOLLYA (2023)
