= Dari (band) =

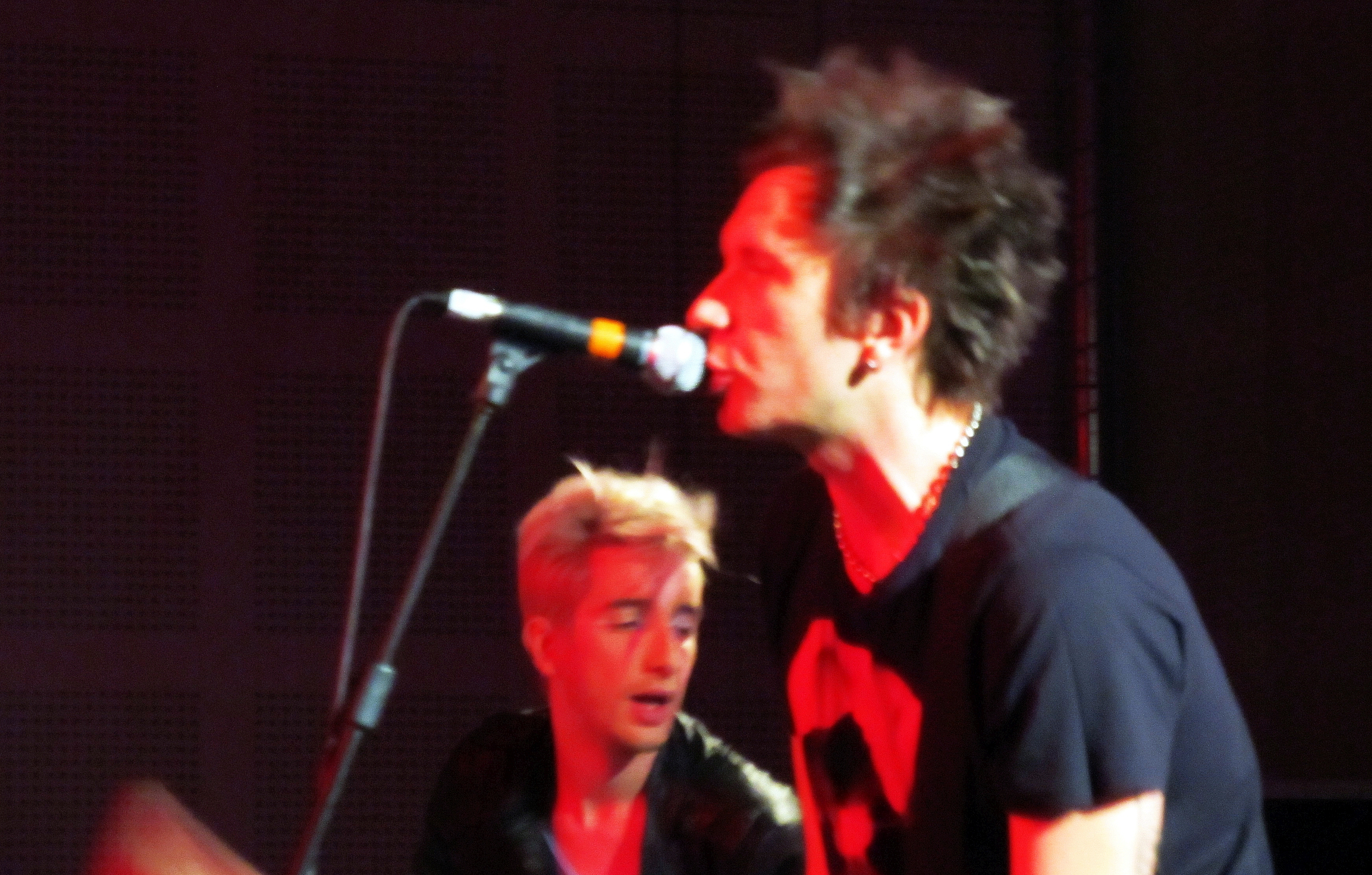
- Dario Pirovano and Andrea Cadioli in Artisti valdostani per l'Emilia (Aosta, July 2012)

Background information
- Origin: Aosta, Italy
- Genres: Emo pop, Electropop
- Label: EMI Italiana/Bliss Co.
- Members: Dario "Dari" Pirovano (Guitar/Lead Vocals); Fabio "Fab" Cuffari (Bass/Vocals); Andrea "Cadio" Cadioli (Keyboards/Synths); Daniel "Fasa" Fasano (Drums)
- Website: http://www.dariforce.it

Dari (often stylized as dARI) is an Italian band best known for their eccentric style use of bright colors. They became famous when their music video, Wale (Tanto Wale), became an Italian internet phenomenon.

== Band history ==
The band started as a solo project. Dario Pirovano wrote and composed the first song "Per Piacere" ("Please") with a demo version of the software Fruity Loops, found in a cereal box. After a few solo appearances he soon realized he needed a few additional components to support the band. Alberto Oscarelli joined the group as a DJ and keyboard player, while Francois Domaine joined in as bass guitar player. Since then the band has seen seven different formations, with Francois moving from bass to drums thanks to his musical versatility, Fabio joining the band, and Alberto being their keyboard player until he moved to the United States to start his career as a photographer with Cadio taking his place. Domaine eventually left the band and was replaced by William Novelli. Later in March 2008, drummer Novelli left the band for personal reasons, and was replaced by Daniel Fasano.

Dari entered the studio in November, with producers Domenico Capuano and Federico Malandrino, to record the album Sottovuoto Generazionale. Their first single, "Wale (Tanto Wale)" and its video were released in March, and became immensely popular on YouTube in Italy.

The lyrics of "Wale (Tanto Wale)" are a play on words. Although originally titled "Vale (Tanto Vale)," the spelling had to be changed when the V key on Dario Pirovano's (lead singer/songwriter) laptop broke. The band decided to keep the changed spelling in the title and official lyrics.

With help from their producers, the group created a short reality series called "Dari4Real," four-minute videos which were put on YouTube.

In the summer of 2008 they performed on TRL Italy, All Music Community, and Scalo 76 (in one of their performances they performed "Rock'n'roll Robot" with Alberto Camerini, one of the most famous singers to come from Milan).) In October 2009 they were asked by Cinema Bizarre to open their first Italian show.

On 12 September 2008 their first album, Sottovuoto Generazionale, was released by EMI Italiana. In its first week it placed at #12 on the Italian music charts.

In October 2008 they went on their first national tour of Italy, Sottovuoto Generazionale Tour, on which they performed in various Italian theaters, like the Colosseo in Turin.

In October 2008 they released "Tutto Regolare," the second single from their first album. In March 2009 they released their third single, a remix of the song "Non Pensavo" (from their first album) featuring Max Pezzali, a well known Italian singer. Following this single was the publication of the book TuttoDariFare, edited by Sperling & Kupfer.

The version of "Non Pensavo" with Max Pezzali was included in their EP Sottovuoto: D-Version, released on 8 May 2009. Between May and June 2009 Dari received a TRL Music Award and a Wind Music Award for Best New Artist.

On 15 June they released the video for "Cercasi Amore," which was selected by Coca-Cola Live @ MTV Summer Song, and won second place in the final phase of the competition.

Dari toured for the entire summer in 2009, on their D-Version Tour. In September they released a series of live videos entitled "Dari4Real," filmed during a concert in Turin and with subtitles and comments from the band in English. In October they began the filming for a fifth music video, "Casa Casa Mia," which was released at the beginning of November. During the Christmas season they made another short reality series for MTV Pulse, entitled "Natale Non Esiste" ("Christmas Doesn't Exist").

The single "Più di Te" ("More Than You"), a 1980s-inspired song with a bizarre and colorful music video, was released on 14 May 2010, after premiering on the Italian TRL Awards. A new album, In Testa, was released on 8 June.

After releasing many video clips on YouTube and few line-up changes, in late 2017 Dari finally released their third studio album.

== Musical style ==
Dari refer to their musical style as "Emotronik" (emotional electronica), a term that they feel summarizes their sound and the sum of their individual musical experiences, but they're also often listed as Pop Rock, Pop Punk, and Electronic. They're well known for their unusual hairstyles, tight pants, bright colors, and makeup.

== Formation ==
=== Current ===
- Dario "Dari" Pirovano (Aosta, 24 November 1982) - guitar, voice
- Fabio "Fab" Cuffari (Aosta, 14 August 1982) - bass, voice
- Daniel "Fasa" Fasano (Vercelli, 20 May 1988) - drums

=== Past members ===
- Francois "Cianci" Domaine, bass (2003–2005) - drums (2005–2006)
- Alberto "Albaz" Oscarelli, keyboards, Dj (2003–2005)
- Luca "P8A" Benedet, drums (2004–2005)
- William Novelli – drums, voice (2006–2008)
- Andrea "Cadio" Cadioli – Keyboards, synthesizers (2006–2012)

== Discography ==
=== Studio albums ===
- 2008 - Sottovuoto generazionale ("Generational Subvoid") (EMI Italiana)
- 2010 - In Testa ("In my head") (EMI Italiana)
- 2017 - VADO FORTE MUOIO GIOVANE ("I go hard, I die young") (Bliss Corporation)

=== EPs ===
- 2009 - Sottovuoto: D-Version ("Subvoid: D-Version")

=== Demos ===
- 2007 - LoveGain

=== Unreleased albums ===
- 2004 - CoSaVoGlIoDiRe ("WhatIWanttoSay")
- 2005 – misonfattocasa ("IJustSettled")

=== Singles ===
- 2008 - Wale (tanto wale) ("Wale (For What it's Worth)")
- 2008 - Tutto regolare ("All Regular" or "Everything's Okay")
- 2008 - Wale (Buon Natale); ("Wale (Merry Christmas))" (Special Christmas version of Wale (Tanto Wale))
- 2009 - Hey Giò
- 2009 - Non pensavo (feat. Max Pezzali) ("I Didn't Think")
- 2009 - Cercasi AAAmore ("Searching For L-L-Love")
- 2009 - Casa casa mia ("House, My House")
- 2010 - Più Di Te ("More Than You")
- 2014 - Solo Punk Rock (Only Punk Rock)
- 2014 - Universo (Universe)

== Bibliography ==
- 2009 - TuttoDariFare
