= Ladri di Carrozzelle =

Ladri di Carrozzelle ("Wheelchair Thieves" as the name is a play on the film Bicycle Thieves) is an Italian Pop rock group that formed due to a summer event in 1989 for the Union for the Fight Against Muscular Dystrophy. That said not all the members have Muscular dystrophy or use wheelchairs. In 2004 the group had 11 members in total with 8 in wheelchairs. They have put out several albums and performed at World Youth Day. The music they play varies from heavy metal to funk to pop.

== Members ==
=== Current ===
- Paolo Falessi "Falex" - guitar
- Anna di Stefano "Gnappa" - singer
- Alessandro Tordeschi "Saso" - singer
- Manuela Gasbarri "Manu" - singer
- Domenico Aldorasi "Mr President" - Keyboard
- Roberto Pucci "Pucci" - bass guitar
- Massimo Cavallaro "Cavallino" - drums
- Daniele Placidi "Micio" - drums
- Massimiliano Sciaqua "Koala" - drums
- Mario Contarino "Contarillo" - drums
- Emiliano Esposti "Roscio" - guitar
- Rosario Contarino "Mr Obvius" - drums

=== Former members ===
- Luca Bassani - (2000-2005)
- Fabiano Lioi "Frodo" - instrumentalist - (2002-2006)
- Pino Costanzi - guitar (1989-1998)
- Guido e Roberto Garofolini - (1989-1993)
- Massimo Paolini - (1989-1992)
- Piero Pasquavaglio - (1989-2000)
- Mario Stranci - (1989-1992)

== Discography ==
- 1992 - Distrofichetto (single)
- 1993 - Chi non salta
- 1997 - Cambio di rotta
- 1998 - In concerto? (live)
- 1998 - Anima mia (cd singolo)
- 1999 - Scuolatour
- 2000 - Sparta (e dintorni)
- 2003 - Live? (live)
- 2005 - Come un battito d'ali
