= Alessio Bernabei =

Italian singer

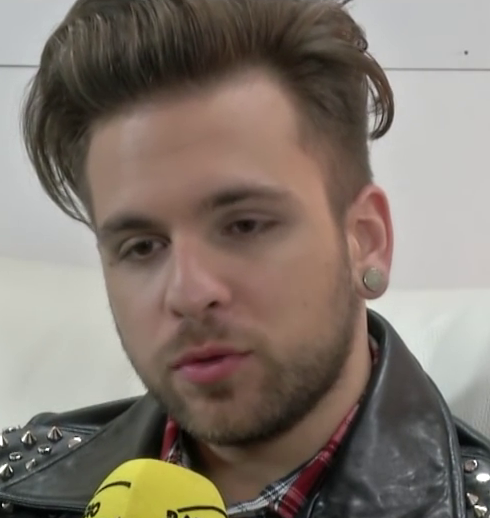
- Bernabei in 2017

Background information
- Born: September 4, 1992 (age 33); Tarquinia, Italy
- Years active: 2012–present
- Label: Warner Music Italy
- Formerly of: Dear Jack
- Website: www.alessiobernabei.it

Alessio Bernabei (born September 4, 1992) is an Italian singer.

== Early life ==
Bernabei was born in Tarquinia. He formed his first band at the age of 14.

== Dear Jack ==
In 2012, Bernabei founded the band Dear Jack with Francesco Pierozzi, Lorenzo Cantarini, Alessandro Presti and Riccardo Ruiu. In 2015, he departed the band to start a solo career.

== Solo career ==
After departing Dear Jack in 2015, Bernabei signed a contract with Warner Music Italy.

Bernabei has recorded two solo albums - Noi siamo infinito in 2016 and Senza filtri in 2018, as well as many singles.

He has participated at Sanremo Music Festival on three occasions. His first participation was in 2015 with Dear Jack and the song Il mondo episode, coming 7th in the Big Artists final. Bernabei returned as a soloist in 2016 with the song Noi siamo infinito, which finished 14th in the Big Artists final. His most recent participation was in 2017 with the song 'Nel mezzo di un applauso', which came 15th in the Big Artists final.

He was nominated as Favorite Italian Singer at the 2016 and 2017 Kids' Choice Awards.

== Discography ==
Albums

- 2016 – Noi siamo infinito
- 2018 – Senza filtri

Singles

- 2016 – Noi siamo infinito
- 2016 – Io e te = la soluzione
- 2016 – Due giganti
- 2017 – Nel mezzo di un applauso
- 2017 – Non è il Sudamerica
- 2018 – Ti ricordi di me?
- 2018 – Messi e Ronaldo
- 2020 – Trinidad
- 2021 – Everest
