= Gülşen discography =

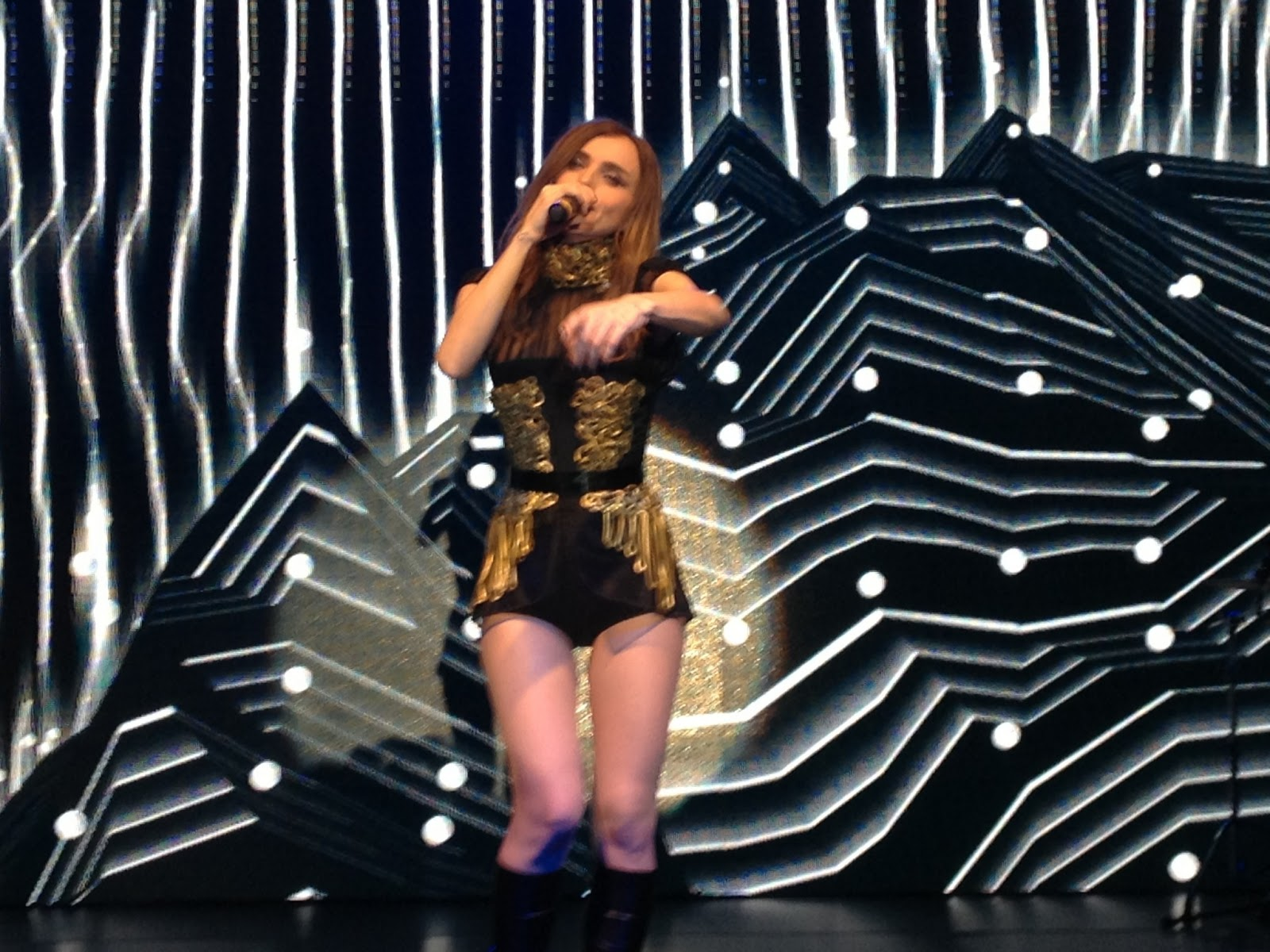
- Gülşen in 2013
- Studio albums: 10
- Singles: 10
- Music videos: 40

This is the discography of Turkish pop singer Gülşen, who has released ten studio albums and numerous singles.

== Albums ==
=== Studio albums ===
List of studio albums
Title	Album details	Certifications	Sales
Be Adam (Oh Man)	Released: 1 July 1996; Label: Raks Müzik; Format: Cassette, CD, digital download		
Erkeksen (If You're A Man)	Released: 1998; Label: Prestij Müzik, Türküola Müzik; Format: Cassette, CD, digital download		
Şimdi (Now)	Released: 2001; Label: Prestij Müzik; Format: Cassette, CD, digital download		
Of... Of... (Ugh... Ugh...)	Released: 28 September 2004; Label: Erol Köse Production; Format: Cassette, CD, digital download		Turkey: 232,000
Yurtta Aşk Cihanda Aşk (Love at Home Love in the World)	Released: 20 February 2006; Label: Erol Köse Production; Format: Cassette, CD, digital download	MÜ-YAP: Gold	Turkey: 171,000
Ama Bir Farkla (But with a Difference)	Released: 13 July 2007; Label: Rec by Saatci; Format: Cassette, CD, digital download		
Önsöz (Foreword)	Released: 22 December 2009; Label: Arista Records, Sony Music; Format: CD, digital download		
Beni Durdursan mı? (Would You Stop Me?)	Released: 20 February 2013; Label: Doğan Music Company; Format: CD, digital download	DMC: Gold	Turkey: 100,000
Bangır Bangır (Loudly Loudly)	Released: 29 April 2015; Label: Doğan Music Company; Format: CD, digital download	DMC: Gold	Turkey: 100,000

=== Demo albums ===
List of demo albums
Title	Album details	Certifications	Sales
Mucize (Miracle)	Released: 29 May 2007; Label: Erol Köse Production; Format: Cassette, CD, digital download		

=== Compilation albums ===
List of compilation albums
Title	Album details
2005 Özel: Of... Of... Albümü ve Remixler (2005 Exclusive: Ugh... Ugh... Album and Remixes)	Released: 27 June 2005; Label: Erol Köse Production; Format: Cassette, CD, digital download

== Singles ==
List of singles as lead artist
Title	Year	Album
"Yapamazsan Yok"	2008	Non-album single
"Hayat Bir Su"	2010	Non-album single
"Yeni Biri"	2011	Non-album single
"En Parlak Yıldız"	2011	Non-album single
"Sözde Ayrılık"	2011	Non-album single
"Yatcaz Kalkcaz Ordayım"	2013	Beni Durdursan mı?
"İltimas" (featuring Murat Boz)	2014	Non-album single
"Yazıyor Yazıyor"	2014	Non-album single
"Birlikte Güzel" (featuring Cem Belevi & İlyas Yalçıntaş)	2017	Non-album single
"Bir İhtimal Biliyorum"	2018	Non-album single
"Nirvana" (featuring Edis)	2020	Non-album single
"Lolipop"	2022	Non-album single
"Bir Kereden Hiçbir Şey Olmaz" (featuring Ozan Doğulu)	2022	Non-album single
"Bal"	2024	Non-album single
"İtaat Yok"	2026	Non-album single

List of singles as featured artist
Title	Year	Album
"Kaderim" (with Emirkan)	2008	Bitti Ruhumun Gezmeleri
"Sakin Ol!"	2008	Uzay Heparı Sonsuza
"Seyre Dursun Aşk" (with Ozan Çolakoğlu)	2011	01
"Emrin Olur"	2014	Kayahan En İyileri No.1
"Namus" (with Ozan Doğulu)	2014	130 Bpm Moderato
"Dünya" (with Abdullah İnal)	2016	Non-album single
"Her Gece"	2017	Mirkelam Şarkıları
"Delikanlım"	2018	Yıldız Tilbe'nin Yıldızlı Şarkıları
"Sen Affetsen Ben Affetmem"	2022	Saygı Albümü: Bergen
"Sor" (with Edis)	2023	Serdar Ortaç Şarkıları Vol. 2

== Charts ==
List of singles, release date and album name
Single	Year	Peak	Album
Single	Year	TR	Album
"Ya Tutarsa"	2006	5	Yurtta Aşk Cihanda Aşk
"Yurtta Aşk Cihanda Aşk"	2006	1	Yurtta Aşk Cihanda Aşk
"Canın Sağolsun"	2006	—	Yurtta Aşk Cihanda Aşk
"En Şahanesinden"	2007	4	Yurtta Aşk Cihanda Aşk
"Kara Böcükler"	2007	—	Ama Bir Farkla
"E Bilemem Artık"	2007	2	Ama Bir Farkla
"Su Gibi Geçerdi Zaman"	2008	—	Ama Bir Farkla
"Yapamazsan Yok"	2008	11	Yapamazsan Yok
"Bi' An Gel"	2010	1	Önsöz
"Ezberbozan"	2010	3	Önsöz
"Önsöz"	2010	6	Önsöz
"Dillere Düşeceğiz Seninle"	2010	10	Önsöz
"Yeni Biri"	2011	1	Yeni Biri
"Sözde Ayrılık"	2011	1	Sözde Ayrılık
"Seyre Dursun Aşk" (feat. Ozan Çolakoğlu)	2012	2	01
"Yatcaz Kalkcaz Ordayım"	2013	1	Beni Durdursan mı?
"Kardan Adam"	2013	1	Beni Durdursan mı?
"Irgalamaz Beni"	2014	3	Beni Durdursan mı?
"İltimas" (feat. Murat Boz)	2014	1	İltimas
"Bangır Bangır"	2015	1	Bangır Bangır
"Dan Dan"	2015	3	Bangır Bangır
"Bir İhtimal Biliyorum"	2018	1	Bir İhtimal Biliyorum
"Nirvana" (feat. Edis)	2020	3	Nirvana
"Lolipop"	2022	8	Lolipop
"—" indicates that the songs were not included in the lists or the results were not disclosed.
