= Çağla =

- Pronunciation: [tʃɑːɫɑ]
- Gender: Female
- Language: Turkish

Origin
- Region of origin: Turkey

Çağla is a Turkish female given name. Notable people with the name include:

- Çağla Akalın (born 1990), Turkish actress, model, columnist, singer and human rights activist
- Çağla Akın (born 1995), Turkish volleyball player
- Çağla Baş (born 1992), Turkish wheelchair basketball player and Paralympic shooter
- Çağla Büyükakçay (born 1989), Turkish tennis player: She has won ten singles and 14 doubles titles on the ITF Circuit.
- Çağla Demirsal (born 1995), Turkish ice dancer
- Cagla Eroglu, Turkish neuroscientist
- Çağla Irmak (born 1997), Turkish actress
- Çağla Korkmaz (born 1990), Turkish-German women's footballer
- Çağla Kubat (born 1979), Turkish model, actress and windsurfer
- Çağla Şimşek (2002), Turkish actress
- Çağla Şıkel (born 1979), Turkish ballet dancer, model, actress and television presenter
- Çağla Yaman (born 1981), Turkish handball player
- Kezban Çağla Ateş (born 1988), Turkish volleyball player
- Nazlı Çağla Dönertaş (born 1991), Turkish yacht racer

== See also ==
- Çağlar (name), a Turkish given name and surname
- Çağlayan (surname)
