= Gülşen (singer) =

Turkish singer (born 1976)

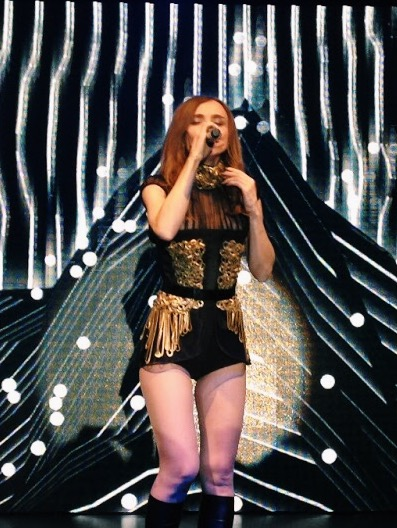
- Gülşen performing at the İzmir Arena in 2013
- Born: Gülşen Bayraktar; 29 May 1976 (age 50); Fatih, Istanbul, Turkey
- Education: Şehremini High School; Istanbul Technical University (left)
- Occupation: Singer-songwriter
- Spouses: Murat Varol (m. 1996; div. 2000) Ozan Çolakoğlu (m. 2016)
- Children: 1
- Musical career
- Genres: Pop; dance; electropop
- Instrument: Vocals
- Years active: 1996–present
- Labels: Raks; Prestij; Erol Köse; Rec by Saatchi; Sony; DMC

Gülşen Çolakoğlu (née Bayraktar, pronounced [gylˈʃen bajɾakˈtaɾ]; born 29 May 1976) is a Turkish singer-songwriter. Born and raised in Istanbul, she graduated from Şehremini High School. After finishing high school, Gülşen enrolled in Istanbul Technical University and at the same time began performing at bars and later left the university. In 1995, while performing at a bar, she was discovered by a composer and contracted with Raks Müzik for her first studio album.

Gülşen's debut album, Be Adam, was released in 1996, which made her known in the music industry, but she preferred to take a break from her professional career and instead focused on her marital life. In 2004, her fourth studio album Of... Of... became a hit in Turkey and a single with the same name as the album earned her both a Golden Butterfly Award and a Turkey Music Award. The Mü-Yap certified album Yurtta Aşk Cihanda Aşk (2006) and her subsequent albums had successful sales, and Beni Durdursan mı? (2013) became Turkey's best-selling album of the year, followed by Bangır Bangır (2015), which became the second best-selling album of 2015. The singles "Yurtta Aşk Cihanda Aşk", "Bi' An Gel", "Yeni Biri", "Sözde Ayrılık", "Yatcaz Kalkcaz Ordayım", "Kardan Adam", "İltimas", "Bangır Bangır" and "Bir İhtimal Biliyorum" all became number-one hits on Türkçe Top 20.

Gülşen, who has received positive reception from music critics and alongside her singing career is a prominent figure as a songwriter, started singing her own songs, especially after the early years of her career, and has produced many hit songs for her colleagues as well. In 2015, she became the Turkish singer with the most number of viewers on YouTube and a year later she became the first Turkish singer to have a music video watched over 200 million times on the platform. Throughout her career, she has won numerous awards, including six Golden Butterfly Awards and nine Kral Turkey Music Awards.

== Life and career ==
=== 1976–95: Early life and career beginnings ===
Gülşen Bayraktar was born on 29 May 1976 in Fatih, Istanbul, to a family that originated from Ordu. She is her parents' third and last child. Her father, Arslan Bayraktar, was a mechanical engineer, while her mother, Nimet Bayraktar, was a housewife. She spent her childhood and youth in Çapa and together with her family visited Ordu Province several times a year, where they owned nut gardens. A fan of Far East martial arts, Gülşen began to learn karate in high school and later received her black belt. She was forced to use the martial art at the age 17 while she and her friend were harassed in the street and has said that similar occasions have happened several times in her daily life. After finishing her studies at Şehremini Anadolu High School, she began studying Turkish classical music at the Istanbul Technical University. Simultaneously, she began performing at night clubs and bars in Istanbul but as she couldn't handle both her studies and her job, she left the university after the first year. She subsequently got Turkish folk music lessons, and worked as a backing vocalist for Çelik and Bendeniz for three months. In 1995, she was discovered by producer Serap Turgay while performing at a bar in Bakırköy. After being introduced to Turgay's husband Özkan Turgay, Gülşen received an offer to make her first album. She finally signed a contract with Raks Müzik to produce four albums.

=== 1996–2003: Be Adam, Erkeksen and Şimdi ===
After signing a contract with Raks Müzik, Gülşen began working on her first album in the second half of 1995. Meanwhile, at the request of the production company, she played in a music video for Tulga's single "Ay Bu Kız Beni Öldürecek". Many of the songs in her first album Be Adam (Oh Man!) were written and composed by Serap and Özkan Turgay. It was released in July 1996 and featured the single "Gel Çarem". Following the release of the album, Milliyet wrote that Gülşen had made an ambitious start in her career. After releasing the music video for "Gel Çarem", she recorded a music video for a single with the same title as her album, "Be Adam". Gülşen, who was shown wearing a pajama in the music video, became known as the "pajama girl" in the Turkish media. Subsequently, a third and a fourth music video were released for "Saz mı Caz mı?" and "Son Sözüm". The album earned Gülşen a nomination in the Best Newcomer Female Artist category at the 3rd Kral TV Video Music Awards. A few months after the release of Be Adam, she married the nightclub operator Murat Varol. Following her marriage, she decided to put aside her career for a while.

In 1998, she signed a new contract with Prestij Müzik, which in return caused a dispute between her new and old producers. Gülşen was sued by Serap Turgay, who stated that Gülşen had agreed to work with Raks Müzik for another two years, while Mahsun Kırmızıgül from Prestij Müzik refused the accusations by saying that they had signed a contract with Gülşen after negotiations with the previous company had failed. As a result, the singer's second album Erkeksen (If You're A Man) was produced by Prestij Müzik and released in December 1998. Gülşen later stated that "[Following Be Adam] I made another album so that I could enjoy it, I went out on the scene several times in my husband's places." She wrote the lyrics for the singles "Yiğidim", "Delisin" and "Gözü Karalım", and subsequently separate music videos were released for each of them.

In the final months of 2000, Gülşen divorced her husband Murat Varol due to irreconcilable differences. Following their divorce, she refused the allegations of violence by her ex-husband, saying in a report: "He didn't beat me, I beat him because I have a black belt in karate." Her third studio album Şimdi (Now), which was also released by Prestij Müzik in November 2001, featured the leading single "İhanet" (Betrayal) written by Gülşen. It was about the couple's extramarital affairs during their marriage. The album's production company was affected during the 2001 Turkish economic crisis, and as a result, they produced one music video only for the song "İhanet".

=== 2004–06: Of... Of..., Yurtta Aşk Cihanda Aşk ===
For her fourth studio album, Gülşen signed a contract with Erol Köse Production and released the album Of... Of... (Ugh... Ugh...) in September 2004. Radio broadcaster Michael Kuyucu described it as "The best of Gülşen's career [up to now]". The album sold 335,000 copies in Turkey and Gülşen was chosen as the Best Female Pop Singer at the 11th Turkey Music Awards. The release of this album was a turning point in Gülşen's career, and Milliyet wrote: "The singer Gülşen, who had not been seen anywhere while married to Murat Varol, has changed completely after she left her husband. With her sexy image and new album, Gülşen has risen to stardom." The song "Of Of" from the same album became a hit in Turkey and was eventually chosen as the Song of the Year at the 11th Turkey Music Awards. After the release of a music video for "Of Of", three more music videos were made for the songs "Sakıncalı", "Nazar Değmesin" and "Sarışınım". The music video for "Sarışınım" was considered erotic by the Radio and Television Supreme Council, who said it "is contrary to social values and leads to sexual abuse". Kral TV and Number 1 TV were both charged for broadcasting the music video. In June 2005, a remixed version of Of... Of... was released.

Inspired by Mustafa Kemal Atatürk's motto of "Yurtta sulh, cihanda sulh" (Peace at Home, Peace in the World), Gülşen titled her fifth studio album Yurtta Aşk Cihanda Aşk (Love at Home, Love in the World), which was released by Erol Köse Production in February 2006. The album ranked number one on D&R's list of best-selling albums, and sold 171,000 copies in Turkey, receiving a gold certification from Mü-Yap. Three music videos were made for the songs "Ya Tutarsa", "Yurtta Aşk Cihanda Aşk" and "Canın Sağolsun", the first of which rose to the top 5 on Türkçe Top 20, while the second one became a number-one hit. In June, producer Erol Köse revealed on a TV program that he was in a relationship with Gülşen. As he was married at the time, this caused a controversy in Turkey's media at the time. Gülşen, who organized a press conference to discuss the issue, confirmed that their relationship had begun in August 2005 when he told her that he was divorced, but two months earlier Köse had revealed to her that he was still married and she ended the relationship. Köse claimed that Gülşen knew about him being married since the beginning and this caused tension between the parties. As a result, Gülşen ended her contract with the Erol Köse's music company. Subsequently, Gülşen went to the court several times due to numerous issues involving Köse. Eventually, Gülşen started a relationship with journalist Reha Muhtar in July 2006 which lasted until February 2007.

=== 2007–12: Ama Bir Farkla and Önsöz ===
In the early months of 2007, Gülşen signed a contract with Ercan Saatçi's production company, Rec by Saatchi, to produce three new albums, and Erol Köse's negotiations to make a new deal with her failed. In May 2007, however, Erol Köse's production company released a previously recorded album by Gülşen, titled Mucize (Miracle). Eventually, Gülşen applied to the court to stop the distribution of the album, trying to release the album by another record company, saying that Köse was using her work to his benefit without permission. Her sixth studio album, Ama Bir Farkla (But with a Difference), was released in July by Rec by Saatchi. Three music videos were made for the songs "Kara Böcükler", "E Bilemem Artık" and "Su Gibi Geçerdi Zaman", the second of which ranked second on Turkey's music chart. In mid-2007, Gülşen was in a relationship with architect Fahrettin Aykut. In September 2007, she got in a feud with Bengü, an artist working for Erol Köse's production company, about whom Gülşen said: "I wouldn't be surprised if Bengü falls in love with Erol Köse." A month later, following her concert at a casino in Dikmen she was escorted by police out of the area due to the presence of alcoholic and armed people. It was later reported that she had been assaulted by firearm that night, although Milliyet questioned the credibility of this claim as there was no police report found about this issue. Later, when questioned about the incident by reporters Gülşen said: "It's true that I was assaulted. The incident was referred to the judiciary."

In July 2008, Gülşen released the single "Yapamazsan Yok", which ranked 11th on the Turkish music chart. At the end of July, Gülşen was among the singers who were featured on the album Uzay Heparı Sonsuza in tribute to the singer Uzay Heparı.

In July 2009, Sabah reported that Gülşen was not satisfied with the second album that she was preparing with the production company Rec by Saatchi, and as a result, she had decided to stop working with them. For a while, she spent her time in search of a production company and had to postpone the publication date of her seventh studio album. She also went to London to study music, painting, photography and instrument training in preparation for the album. Her seventh studio album, Önsöz (Foreword), was released in the last days of the year by Sony Music Entertainment and Arista Records. Anchorman Michael Kuyucu believed that after her departure form Erol Köse Production her "confusion" over what she needed to do was over. The lead single "Bi' An Gel" became a hit in Turkey and ranked number-one on the Turkish music chart for three weeks. For its music video, Gülşen wore a chandelier on her head. Onur Baştürk of Hürriyet described it as "the best music video I have seen in a while", and the clip was nominated for the Best Music Video Award at the 17th Turkey Music Awards. A second music video was made for the Latin pop song "Ezberbozan", which ranked third on the Turkish music chart. "Önsöz" and "Dillere Düşeceğiz Seninle" ranked sixth and tenth on the chart respectively.

In 2011, Gülşen started to work on her new studio album and signed a new contract with Doğan Music Company, releasing the singles "Yeni Biri" and "Sözde Ayrılık" under their label. Both of these songs became number-one hits in Turkey. In the following year, she worked with Ozan Çolakoğlu on his album 01. The lead single of the album "Seyre Dursun Aşk", which was voiced by Gülşen, ranked second on the Turkish music chart.

=== 2013–17: Beni Durdursan mı? and Bangır Bangır ===
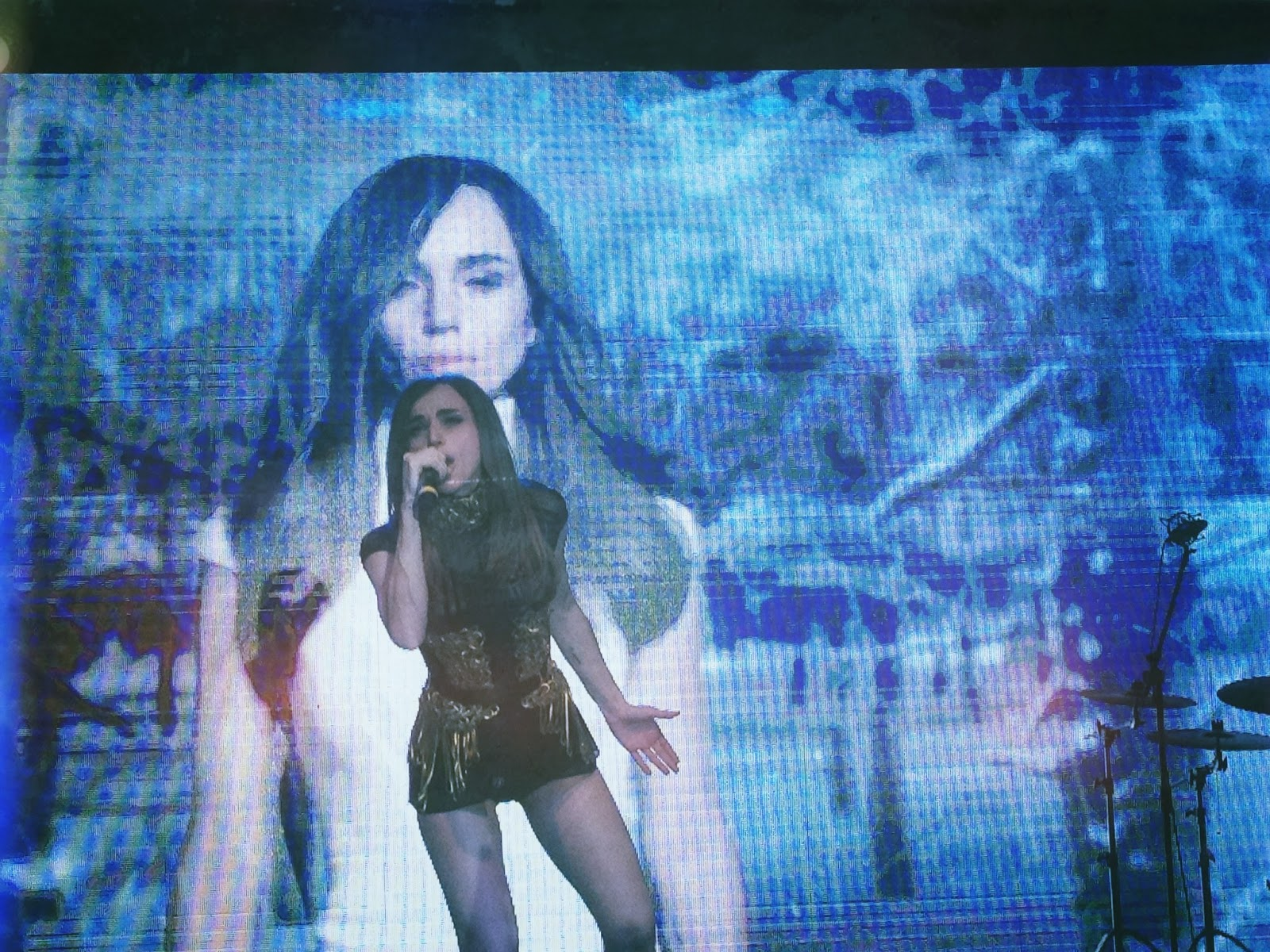
Gülşen performing at İzmir Arena, 2013

Gülşen's eighth studio album Beni Durdursan mı? (Would You Stop Me?) was produced by DMC and released in February 2013. The album ranked number-one on D&R's Best-Selling List for weeks. It sold 100,000 copies by the end of the year and became the most-sold album in Turkey, receiving a gold certification from DMC. While some of the music critics gave a negative review for not finding the work to be eye-catching, some praised the content and the compositions. The songs "Yatcaz Kalkcaz Ordayım" and "Kardan Adam" both became number-one hits on Türkçe Top 20 for seven weeks, and the second one also became the most searched song on Google in Turkey. "Irgalamaz Beni" ranked number-three on the music chart and critics drew similarities between its music video and that of "Wrecking Ball" by American singer Miley Cyrus. To promote the album, Gülşen performed for the first time at the Cemil Topuzlu Open-Air Theatre in September. At the Turkey Music Awards, Gülşen became the most award-winning artist with her album being chosen as Album of the Year and its lead single becoming Song of the Year. She was also awarded as the Best Female Artist, Best Lyricist and Best Composer. "Yatcaz Kalkcaz Ordayım" was given the Song of the Year award at the 41st Golden Butterfly Awards.

In April 2014, Gülşen and Murat Boz released the single "İltimas", which became a hit in Turkey. She later collaborated with composer Ozan Doğulu for his album 130 Bpm Moderato (2014), performing the song "Namus". She was also among the artists featured on the album Kayahan En İyileri No.1 (2015) with the song "Emrin Olur". In May 2015, her ninth studio album Bangır Bangır (Loudly Loudly) was released, and it ranked first on D&R's Best-Selling List, selling 100,000 copies by the end of the year, making Gülşen the second best-selling Turkish artist in 2015. The lead single, also titled "Bangır Bangır", received a gold certification from DMC and was number-one on Turkey's music charts for thirteen weeks. It also became the most searched song on Google in Turkey and the most viewed Turkish music video on YouTube. The song also won the Song of the Year and the Best Music Video of the Year awards at the 42nd Golden Butterfly Awards. Another song from the album, titled "Dan Dan", ranked number-three on charts and its music video caused tension between Gülşen and the Radio and Television Supreme Council (RTÜK). RTÜK drew similarities between the singer's body movements and behavior in the clip and "women who provide services of friendship over the phone", and found its content harmful for children, giving a warning to channels that broadcast the music video. Gülşen described it as "a heavy assault on the honor of womanhood" based on an "unacceptable analogy".

In June 2016, Gülşen married the arranger and composer of her last three albums, Ozan Çolakoğlu. The couple's first child, a son named Azur Benan, was born in Şişli, Istanbul, in January 2017.

=== 2018–present: Tenth studio album ===
In 2018, Gülşen was among the artists whose name appeared on the album Yıldız Tilbe'nin Yıldızlı Şarkıları, and performed the song "Delikanlım". She also announced that she was working on her tenth studio album and released the song "Bir İhtimal Biliyorum" as a promotional single. On its first week of release, the song topped the sales list on digital platforms in Turkey and ranked number one on MusicTopTR's List of Fastest Rising Songs. It ranked first on Turkey's official music chart for thirteen consecutive weeks. According to Telifmetre, Gülşen was the female artist with the most number of streams in Turkey in the first six months of 2019. In August 2020, her duet with Edis, titled "Nirvana", was released on digital platforms.

==== August 2022 arrest ====
On 25 August 2022, an investigation was launched against Gülşen by the Istanbul Chief Public Prosecutor's Office for a joke she had made about the religious İmam Hatip schools. In the video that was taken in April 2022, Gülşen is shown on stage during a concert, joking with one of her band members and saying "He studied at an İmam Hatip [school] previously. That's where his perversion comes from." Once the video was released by the pro-government Sabah newspaper and shared on the social media, thousands of tweets were posted by "conservatives" with the hashtags "#GülşenTutuklansın" (Get Gülşen Arrested) and "#HaddiniBilGülşen" (Know Your Place Gülşen), targeting and threatening the singer.

In a message published via her social media accounts, Gülşen apologized to anyone who might have been offended by the remarks, which she described as a "joke between colleagues", and described the backlash as an attempt by those wanting to "polarize society". On the same day, she was arrested at home, taken to the Police Department and later to the Istanbul Courthouse, accompanied by her lawyer. During the questioning, the singer spoke of her "endless respect for the values and sensitivities of my country", and denied the charges brought against her. She was sent to Bakırköy Women's Prison on charges of "inciting or insulting the public to hatred and enmity", after her request for being released until a trial had taken place was rejected.

Many fellow singers, artists and celebrities published statements in support of Gülşen. In the day following her arrest, a video surfaced of Fenerbahçe S.K. fans at a stadium singing her hit "Yurtta Aşk Cihanda Aşk". In a post published on Twitter, the Main Opposition Leader Kemal Kılıçdaroğlu asked for the artist to be released immediately. Ömer Çelik, the spokesman for the ruling party AKP, spoke in support of arresting Gülşen, stating "inciting hatred is not an art form".

The decision to arrest Gülşen, known for her revealing stage outfits and her support for the LGBT community, and to impose new bans on some music festivals in Turkey was described by government critics as an attempt by the ruling party and its leader Recep Tayyip Erdoğan (an İmam Hatip graduate) to garner support from the religious and conservative figures ahead of the 2023 presidential and parliamentary elections and shift people's minds away from the economic issues.

On 27 August, a spokesperson for the United States Department of State expressed concerns about the effects of "censorship and judicial harassment" on freedom of expression in Turkey. On the same day, a group of women gathered in Istanbul to protest the investigation and arrest, which they felt was in contrast to the cases of those who commit violence against women in the country and are allowed to avoid immediate judicial punishment.

On 29 August 2022, Gülşen was released from jail following a ruling by the Istanbul criminal court and was placed under house arrest pending a trial. The decision came after an appeal against her imprisonment by her lawyer, with the court agreeing to her release based on the fact that she had a small child, "was not a flight risk and was unlikely to tamper with evidence".

On 2 September 2022, the 48-page indictment was completed with 702 complaints from different individuals, "a pro-government women's rights organization and an association from the religious school". On 12 September 2022, the house arrest was lifted but she was banned from travelling abroad and instructed to register at a police station every week.

On 21 October 2022, she made her first court appearance, where she denied the charges leveled against her. The requirement to register weekly at a police station was lifted, but she was still banned from making any foreign trips. On 26 October 2022, an Istanbul court lifted the travel ban.

In March 2023, it was reported that the prosecutor was demanding for Gülşen to face a sentence of one to three years in prison. In May 2023, a court sentenced her to one year in prison which was changed to a 10-month suspended sentence due to her "respectful stance" in court, but she would face prison if she reoffends within the next five years.

== Charity work and other activities ==
In September 2010, Gülşen became one of the signatories of a project initiated by the Istanbul Metropolitan Municipality under the slogan 'Let the Light within Me Be the Light for You', to help the old residents of hospices across the country and raise awareness about their issues. Gülşen, who has a passion for working on social projects, wrote and voiced a song for UNICEF's Stars of Istanbul education project in 2011, titled "En Parlak Yıldız (The Brightest Star)". In 2012, she went on tour for 8 days with The New York Gypsy All-Stars in five different cities in the United States, performing music in America. The artist met with Turkish Americans in Boston, New York City, Washington, D.C., Chicago and New Jersey. In 2018, with the help of Play for Children Association, Gülşen donated musical instruments to the Arpatepe Middle School in Artuklu, Mardin.

== Discography ==
- Be Adam (1996)
- Erkeksen (1999)
- Şimdi (2001)
- Of... Of... (2004)
- Yurtta Aşk Cihanda Aşk (2006)
- Ama Bir Farkla (2007)
- Önsöz (2009)
- Beni Durdursan mı? (2013)
- Bangır Bangır (2015)

== Songs written and composed by Gülşen ==
Year	Song	Artist	Album	Writer(s)	Composer(s)
2002	"Alnının Yazısı"	Hülya Avşar	Aşıklar Delidir	Gülşen	Gülşen
2003	"Büyüdüm Uslandım"	Rober Hatemo	Aşksız Prens	Gülşen	Gülşen
2009	"Engelli Koşu"	Emir	Ben Sen Olamam	Gülşen	Gülşen
2009	"Başı Bağlı"	Sibel Can	Benim Adım Aşk	Gülşen	Gülşen
2011	"Suistimal"	Sibel Can	Seyyah	Gülşen	Gülşen
2011	"Piyango"	Yeşim Salkım	Piyango	Gülşen	Gülşen
2011	"Haberin Yok"	Yıldız Kaplan	Haberin Yok	Gülşen	Gülşen
2011	"Aşktan Sabıkalı"	Bülent Ersoy	Aşktan Sabıkalı	Gülşen	Gülşen
2011	"Superman"	Hadise	Aşk Kaç Beden Giyer?	Gülşen	Gülşen
2012	"Bir Güzellik Yap"	Murat Dalkılıç	Bir Güzellik Yap	Gülşen	Gülşen
2012	"Sudan Sebep"	Emir	Ateşten Bi' Rüzgar	Yıldız Tilbe	Gülşen
2012	"Tamamen Yanılsama"	Metin Şentürk	Bana Sen Lazımsın	Gülşen	Gülşen
2013	"Aşk"	Petek Dinçöz	Milat	Gülşen	Gülşen
2013	"Sade Tören"	Petek Dinçöz	Milat	Gülşen	Caner Güneysu
2013	"Tesir Altında"	Mustafa Sandal	Tesir Altında	Gülşen	Gülşen
2013	"Ara Sıcak"	Ajda Pekkan	Ara Sıcak	Gülşen	Gülşen · Ozan Çolakoğlu
2014	"Derine"	Murat Dalkılıç	Daha Derine	Gülşen · Amir Teima	Ahmet Salah Hosny
2014	"İki Yol"	Murat Dalkılıç	Daha Derine	Gülşen · Murat Dalkılıç	Murat Dalkılıç
2014	"Her Durumda"	Ebru Gündeş	Araftayım	Gülşen	Gülşen
2015	"Kesin Bilgi" (feat. Ozan Çolakoğlu)	Röya	Kesin Bilgi	Gülşen	Gülşen
2016	"Hayalet"	Demet Akalın	Rakipsiz	Gülşen	Gülşen · Ozan Çolakoğlu
2017	"Bırakma Beni"	Funda Arar	Aşk Hikayesi	Gülşen	Gülşen
2018	"Tak Tak"	Fatih Ürek	Tak Tak	Gülşen	Gülşen
2018	"N'aptın"	Emir	N'aptın Sevgilim	Gülşen	Gülşen
2019	"Geliyorum Yanına"	Hadise	Geliyorum Yanına	Gülşen	Gülşen

- The list above includes songs given to other artists whose lyrics or music belong to Gülşen. She has songs in her own albums that are written and composed by herself but are not mentioned in this list.
