= Çağlayan =

Çağlayan may refer to:

== People ==
- Çağlayan (surname)

== Places ==
In Turkey

- Çağlayan, Alaşehir
- Çağlayan, Çanakçı
- Çağlayan, Çivril
- Çağlayan, Erzincan
- Çağlayan, Fındıklı
- Çağlayan, Gerze
- Çağlayan, Giresun
- Çağlayan, Kağıthane (which hosts the Istanbul Justice Palace)
- Çağlayan, Kalkandere
- Çağlayan, Kars
- Çağlayan, Kulp
- Çağlayan, Ödemiş
- Çağlayan, Pülümür
- Çağlayan, Şebinkarahisar
- Çağlayan, Şişli
- Çağlayan, Ulubey

In Cyprus

- Çağlayan, Nicosia
