= Geliyorum Yanına =

Single by Hadise
- Released: 9 August 2019
- Genre: Pop
- Length: 2:48
- Label: Fanta Music
- Songwriter: Gülşen

"Geliyorum Yanına" (En. I'm Coming to You) is a single by Turkish-Belgian singer Hadise, released in August 2019. It was written by Gülşen, arranged by Ozan Çolakoğlu and released as a promotional song for Fanta in Turkey. The song's music video was directed by Şenol Korkmaz, and shot over 32 hours with a crew of 70 people. It was first shown to the public during Hadise's concert at the Cemil Topuzlu Open-Air Theatre on 10 August 2019.

== Track listing ==
Digital download

1. "Geliyorum Yanına" – 2:48

== Release history ==
Country	Date	Format(s)	Label	Ref.
Turkey	9 August 2019	Digital download	Fanta Music	
Worldwide	9 August 2019	Digital download	Fanta Music	
