= Beni Durdursan mı? =

Studio album by Gülşen
- Released: 20 February 2013
- Recorded: 2012–2013
- Studio: Kaya Müzik; (Istanbul, Turkey)
- Genre: Pop
- Length: 43:17
- Label: DMC
- Producer: Ozan Çolakoğlu

Gülşen chronology
Önsöz (2009)	Beni Durdursan mı? (2013)	Bangır Bangır (2015)

Singles from Beni Durdursan mı?
- 1. "Yatcaz Kalkcaz Ordayım" Released: 14 February 2013; 2. "Kardan Adam" Released: 20 May 2013

Beni Durdursan mı? (Would You Stop Me?) is the eighth studio album by Turkish singer Gülşen. It was released on 20 February 2013 by Doğan Music Company, her first album to be released by this company. Following the release of Önsöz in 2009, Gülşen released the singles "Yeni Biri" and "Sözde Ayrılık" in 2011, and in the same year began working on a new album with Ozan Çolakoğlu. She wrote all of the songs herself and composed a number of them on her own, and composed the rest together with the album's producer Çolakoğlu. The recording was done in Istanbul in 2012, and lasted until the early months of 2013.

The album contained nine new songs by Gülşen, in addition to an acoustic version of "Seyre Dursun Aşk", which had been originally released on Çolakoğlu's album in 2012. Considered a pop album, Beni Durdursan mı? features elements of electronic and arabesque as well. Music critics praised the compositions and infrastructures, but gave mixed reviews for the album and noted that the work included both dance and arabesque songs, giving the audience the freedom of choosing the style that suits them. For the album's photographs and cover, Gülşen's hair was dyed in shades of brown.

Three music videos were released for this album, all of which entered Turkey's music chart as hits. The album's lead single, "Yatcaz Kalkcaz Ordayım", which was released a week before the album, ranked number one on Türkçe Top 20 for seven consecutive weeks and became the most searched song in 2013 on Google in Turkey. The second music video was released for "Kardan Adam", which also stayed on top of Turkey's music chart for seven weeks. "Irgalamaz Beni" was also turned into music video and ranked third on the official chart. Its music video was compared to Miley Cyrus's "Wrecking Ball" by some critics.

Topping D&R Best-Selling list for weeks, Beni Durdursan mı? sold 100,000 copies by the end of 2013 and was downloaded 366,000 times on digital platforms, becoming Turkey's number one best-selling album of 2013 and received a gold certification from DMC. It won the Album of the Year award at the 2nd Turkey Music Awards, and its lead single was also chosen as the Song of the Year. The album also earned Gülşen the Best Female Artist award. The lead single, "Yatcaz Kalkcaz Ordayım", also won the Best Song award at the 41st Golden Butterfly Awards. To promote the album, Gülşen gave concerts in various cities and appeared on a number of television programs. She also performed at the Cemil Topuzlu Open-Air Theatre for the first time throughout her career.

== Background and development ==
In 2009, Gülşen's seventh studio album Önsöz was released by Sony Music Entertainment and two of its songs, "Bi' An Gel" and "Ezberbozan", ranked first and third on Türkçe Top 20. In 2011 she signed a new contract with Doğan Music Company and continued her career with the singles "Yeni Biri" and "Sözde Ayrılık", both of which became number one hits. In April 2011, it was reported that she had started working with composer and arranger Ozan Çolakoğlu, with whom she had previously worked on her previous album. Alongside writing and preparing songs for her own new album, she also wrote and composed songs for her colleagues. She wrote and composed "Superman" for Hadise and "Bir Güzellik Yap" for Murat Dalkılıç, both of which became hits in Turkey.

She had initially planned to release the album in May 2012, but later postponed the date and instead recorded the song "Seyre Dursun Aşk" for Çolakoğlu's album 01. She later explained the reason for this decision: "I said in May, but it won't be May. The reason is that there are many more works that I still need to do. My dreams and my heart's voice tell me to do so. I wish to have everything perfect. All the works that I do, for myself and for my audience, is out of love. In September, all of my songs will be yours, I promise!" However, the album was not released in September. During the preparation process, Gülşen stayed in Gündoğan, Bodrum, for a while. In an interview with Hürriyet, she talked about the album's content and said: "I really want to make an album with a specific concept. But my albums are richer and more varied. So there are electronics, house infrastructures; there are acoustic slow songs and also songs with medium tempo ..." On 12 July 2012, it was reported that she was recording the album with the fastest pace possible. The recording continued through 2012 and ended on 18 January 2013.

== Music and lyrics ==
Beni Durdursan mı? is a pop album that features elements of dance and arabesque music. Except "Aşk Cinayet Sever", "Acısı Bile Bal" and "Seyre Dursun Aşk", all of the songs were written and composed by Gülşen. The three songs were composed together with the album's producer Ozan Çolakoğlu, who also did the arrangements for all of the songs on the album. All of the pieces were recorded at Kaya Müzik studio in Istanbul by Mehmet Can Mayakan and Osman Çetin. Mastering of the songs were done by Çolakoğlu, Emre Kıral and Levent Demirbaş.

Together with the acoustic version of "Seyre Dursun Aşk", the album contains ten songs and unlike a number of her previous albums, it does not include any cover version. The album's lead single, "Yatcaz Kalkcaz Ordayım", is a pop song featuring kemençe sounds. The chorus of the song was "used to describe the concept of time to children in an easy way" with the lyrics: "Yatcaz kalkcaz (We will sleep, wake up) / Yatcaz kalkcaz (Sleep, wake up) / Yatcaz kalkcaz (Sleep, wake up) / Hop ordayım (Whoop, I will be there) / Dağlar, bayırlar, o uzun yollar (The mountains, the slopes, long roads) / Hepsi hikâye, firardayım (All are nonsense, I'm on the run)". The second song "Kardan Adam" has a mild tempo and according to Yavuz Hakan Tok its main words use "the 'Andalusian arabesque' formula that the singer has similarly used before." "Saklandım İzlerinde" also has a mild tempo and elements of arabesque-pop are used in it. It is followed by "Kendine Müslüman", a song with a slow rhythm that also contains arabesque elements. The fifth song "Yalanlar Çok Güzel" is a slow-paced song, followed by the dance-pop hit "Irgalamaz Beni", the lyrics of which were used to choose the album's title. It was also compared to some of Yıldız Tilbe's songs in terms of vocal techniques. The seventh song "Aşk Cinayet İster" also has a slow tempo, while the eighth song "Acısı Bile Bal" is a vibrant song. The final song "Ne Düşünürsen O Olur" was praised by critics for its meaningful lyrics.

== Cover and release ==
Beni Durdursan mı?'s name and cover were released on 14 February 2013 by Gülşen on her Twitter account. For the cover she dyed her hair in different shades of brown. The cover and all the album photographs were taken by Emre Ünal. Zeynep Tosun acted as her costume and image consultant, while Mahizer Aytaş served as her stylist.

After spending $300,000 during the preparation process which lasted for three years, the album was released on 20 February 2013 by Doğan Music Company in CD format inside Turkey and two days later it was made available for digital download worldwide. It was Gülşen's first album released by this production company. On the first week of its release, it ranked first on Turkey's D&R Best-Selling list and remained so for weeks. According to MÜ-YAP, by the end of the year, it sold 100,000 physical copies and was downloaded 366,646 times on digital platforms, becoming the best-selling album of 2013 in Turkey. Due to its sales records, the album received a gold certification from its production company DMC. In 2014, Beni Durdursan mı? received the Best Album by a Female Artist award at the Yeditepe University Dilek Awards and was also awarded the Best Album award at the 4th Pal FM Music Awards and 20th MGD Golden Objective Awards. In the same year, she received five awards at the 2nd Turkey Music Awards, becoming the artist with the most wins at the ceremony; the album and its lead single were given the Album of the Year and the Song of the Year awards and Gülşen herself received the Best Female Artist, Best Songwriter and Best Composer awards.

== Critical reception ==
Beni Durdursan mı? received mixed reviews from music critics. While some did not find the album to be influential and gave it negative reviews, some appreciated the singer's identity as a songwriter and composer. Hürriyet's Sadi Tirak wrote that after listening to the album's lead single, he had lost his hopes for this album, and said: "It neither had a catchy melody nor a meaningful chorus. In terms of instrumental richness and sound, there is an improvement, but they are only detachments that don't come together to make a 'song'." Onur Baştürk from the same newspaper, pointed out Gülşen's claim of "making high-quality hit songs" and wrote that the track listing begins with disco songs and later turns into arabesque, indicating the message in the album was "choose what you like, or what suits you the best." Radioman Michael Kuyucu congratulated Gülşen on writing and composing the songs and asked for an album similar to Of... Of... (2004) in terms of style. He also wrote: "Gülşen and her team still survived the pitfalls of the disastrous pop music world. This is a big plus for her."

Best FM's radiowoman Mine Ayman wrote in her review for Söz Müzik that the album did not make her as excited as she wished and said that choosing "Kardan Adam" as the album's lead single would have increased the effectiveness of its promotion. Writing for Hayat Müzik, Yavuz Hakan Tok gave the album a mixed review and wrote: "For a moment it takes the form of arabesque-alaturka, and the other moment it turns to dance and party songs. [...] This is an album where you will enjoy the high infrastructure and technical perfection that are all created by Ozan Çolakoğlu and you will memorize your candidate 'hit' songs and play them for a long time." He also criticized Gülşen for not experimenting with new songs and compositions, unlike Sezen Aksu whom Gülşen had claimed that she was inspired by. Writing for Dilimin Ayarı Yok, Cem Özsancak praised the singer's collaboration with Çolakoğlu, liked the album and gave it a positive review: "As a sequel to Önsöz, Gülşen gives us an album that is full of stories told through the songs." In addition, various music critics stated in their subsequent reviews that Beni Durdursan mı? (especially "Yatcaz Kalkcaz Ordayım") greatly influenced the singer's next studio album, Bangır Bangır, which was released in 2015.

== Promotion ==
=== Live performances ===
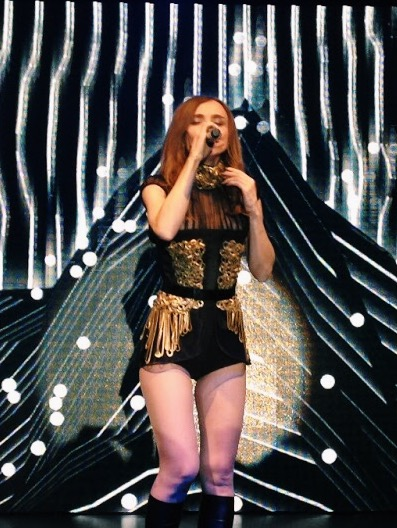
Gülşen performing at one of the promotional concerts for the album in İzmir, April 2013

To promote the album Gülşen went on a tour called Yatcaz Kalkcaz Ordayım, named after the album's lead single, and gave concerts in Turkey and Europe, including a concert on 13 April at the Bostancı Show Center and another one on 22 September at the Cemil Topuzlu Open-Air Theatre. According to Habertürk, in May she performed almost every day at different university campuses, and was the artist that was most asked by the students across the country to perform on their campuses. She also performed her songs on a number of television programs. In March 2013, she appeared on Şeffaf Oda and performed the songs "Kardan Adam", "Kendine Müslüman", "Ne Düşünürsen O Olur", "Seyre Dursun Aşk" and "Yatcaz Kalkcaz Ordayım". In the same month, she also appeared on Beyaz Show and performed the songs "Irgalamaz Beni", "Kardan Adam", "Seyre Dursun Aşk" and "Yatcaz Kalkcaz Ordayım".

=== Music videos ===
The song, "Yatcaz Kalkcaz Ordayım" that was subject to harsh criticism, was released on 14 February 2013 as the album's lead single and remained number-one on Turkey's official music chart for seven weeks. Its music video was released on 14 March, and it was directed by Murad Küçük. In the video Gülşen crossed the forests and the seas and got involved in a clash to reach her goal, in parallel with the lyrics. By the end of the year it was viewed over 30 million times on YouTube, becoming the third most-viewed Turkish music video of 2013 and the most-viewed music video on MÜ-YAP's official channel at the time. It also became the most-searched song in 2013 on Google inside Turkey, and with 131,000 downloads it also became the most-downloaded song of 2013 in Turkey. The following year, it received the Best Song award at both the 2nd Turkey Music Awards and the 41st Golden Butterfly Awards.

On 20 May 2013, the album's second single "Kardan Adam" was released. It was followed by a black and white video that was released on 19 June 2013. The music video was directed by Koray Birand and recorded near a pond and desert-like land in Şile. Model Abdullah İnal accompanied Gülşen on the video. By the end of 2013, the video was viewed over 17 million times on YouTube. Like its predecessor, "Yatcaz Kalkcaz Ordayım", this song also topped Turkey's official music chart for seven weeks.

The music video for "Irgalamaz Beni" was directed by Çağrı Ark and released on 18 September 2013. By the end of the year it was viewed over 6.5 million times on YouTube. Turkish critics found the video similar to Miley Cyrus's music video for "Wrecking Ball". Especially the singer's appearance on a large ball hanging from the ceiling took the attention of critics. Gülşen denied the allegations of copying and said: "I'm not that idiot to imitate a clip that has just been released on the same week as mine. I'm also not that desperate to do it on the same week. We shot the clip on September 3, and there's evidence for those who want it. Miley's clip was shot on the seventh day of the same month. As my clip was released later, it was naturally perceived that I have copied her work. But as we also have the mindset that 'Turks always plagiarize', the attacks were aimed toward me. At the end, it's just an unpleasant coincidence." "Irgalamaz Beni" rose up to number three on Turkey's music chart.

== Track listing ==
All of the songs were written and composed by Gülşen. "Aşk Cinayet Sever", "Acısı Bile Bal" and "Seyre Dursun Aşk" were composed together with Ozan Çolakoğlu.

No.	Title	Length
1.	"Yatcaz Kalkcaz Ordayım"	3:54
2.	"Kardan Adam"	4:04
3.	"Saklandım İzlerinde"	4:55
4.	"Kendine Müslüman"	4:24
5.	"Yalanlar Çok Güzel"	4:57
6.	"Irgalamaz Beni"	3:41
7.	"Aşk Cinayet Sever"	4:23
8.	"Acısı Bile Bal"	3:25
9.	"Seyre Dursun Aşk" (Acoustic)	4:08
10.	"Ne Düşünürsen O Olur"	5:26
Total length:		43:17

== Personnel ==
- Gülşen – singer-songwriter
- Ozan Çolakoğlu – producer, composer (7, 8, 9), arranger, keyboard, programming, mastering (1, 4, 6)
- Caner Güneysu – acoustic guitar, classic guitar
- Birkan Şener – bass
- Gündem – bowed string instruments (4, 5, 7, 9)
- Altın Duble – bowed string instrument (3, 8, 10)
- Hüsnü Şenlendirici – clarinet
- Fatih Ahıskalı – oud
- Ali Yılmaz – bağlama
- Mehmet Akatay – percussion
- Ömer Aslan – asma davul
- Eyüp Hamiş – ney (4)
- Türker Dinletir – ney (10)
- Tahsin Terzi – kemenche
- Görkem Güder – solo violin
- Atınç Tombak – backing vocals
- Eda Ressureccion – backing vocals
- Ercüment Vural – backing vocals (3)
- Mehmet Can Mayakan – recording
- Osman Çetin – recording
- Emre Kıral – mixing, mastering (5)
- Levent Demirbaş – mastering (2, 3, 7-10)
- Emre Ünal – photography
- Zeynep Tosun – costume and image consultant
- Mahizer Aytaş – styling
- Zeynep Üner – creative and communication consultant
- Gülüm Erzincan – hair, make-up
- Serkan Aktürk – hair, make-up
- Şerifcan Özcan – graphic design
- GD Ofset – printing

Credits adapted from Beni Durdursan mı?'s album booklet.

== Charts ==
Chart (2013)	Peak position
Turkey (D&R Best-Selling)	1

== Sales ==
Country	Certification	Sales
Turkey (DMC)	Gold (Note: The certification was not given by Turkey's official music producers association MÜ-YAP, but by the album's production company DMC. DMC only awards its own artists, while MÜ-YAP awards the best-selling artists in general.)	100,000

== Release history ==
Country	Date	Format	Label	Ref.
Turkey	20 February 2013	CD	Doğan Music Company	
Turkey	22 February 2013	Digital download	Doğan Music Company	
Worldwide	22 February 2013	Digital download	Doğan Music Company	
