= Emir (singer) =

Musical artist (born 1980)

- Born: Emir Sevinç; 7 September 1980 (age 45); Istanbul, Turkey
- Origin: Marmara University
- Genres: Pop
- Occupations: Singer
- Years active: 2009–present
- Labels: HITT Production (2009); Kaya Müzik (2012–2013); Sony Music (2014–)

Emir Sevinç (born 7 September 1980) is a Turkish singer and songwriter. Born in Istanbul, he is a graduate of radio and television studies of Marmara University communication faculty.

Emir released his first album Ben Sen Olamam in 2009. He made his debut with the album's lead single "Ben Sen Olamam", written and composed by Tarkan. The songs "Ben Sen Olamam", "Tornistan", "Eline Düştüm", "Şiki Şiki", and "Aşk mı Savaş mı?" from the album were all made into music videos. In 2012, he released his second album Ateşten Bi' Rüzgar. Separate music videos were later released for the songs "Sudan Sebep", "Veda Gecesi", and "Makina". In 2013, Emir released his first single "Tutuşmayan Kalmasın". In 2015, his first extended play Kendimden was released. The songs "Bi' Ağla", and "Yaylı Yatak" were both accompanied by music videos.

In 2009, his song "Eline Düştüm" was awarded the "Most Requested Song" award at the Istanbul FM Music Awards. In 2014, his song "Tutuşmayan Kalmasın" was chosen as the Best Single at Düzce University's 2nd Media Awards. The same single was also chosen as the Best Song at Ege University's 3rd Media Awards. In November 2016, Emir released his new single "Mevsim Sonbahar" on digital platforms under the label Sony Music.

== Career ==
=== 2009–2012: Ben Sen Olamam ===
Emir's first album was produced by HITT Production. The album contained fourteen songs in total. The first music video for the album was released for the song "Ben Sen Olamam". The song soon found a place in many radio and television channels, and ranked fifth on Türkçe Top 20. Its music video was directed by famous video director Murad Küçük and was shot at Gebze Industrial Area. Ceyda Balaban provided the costumes for the video. Dennis Madden, who had the experience of working with Prince, was invited to Turkey to serve as the image director. The second song that was made into music video was "Eline Düştüm", written by Yıldız Tilbe and composed by Phoebus. Murad Küçük again served as the music video director and Robert Benavides took the role of image director. The song proved to be more successful than its predecessor, and ranked 2nd on Türkçe Top 20. Emir worked with a number of famous managers in Turkey for Ben Sen Olamam and collaborated with Haluk Şentürk who served as the record producer. After composing two of the songs from the album, Emir gave the composition of the remaining songs to Ozan Çolakoğlu. Artists such as Nazan Öncel, Yıldız Tilbe, Aysel Gürel and Gülşen were the songwriters whose songs appeared on the album.

=== 2012–2013: Ateşten Bi' Rüzgar and "Tutuşmayan Kalmasın" ===
Emir's second album Ateşten Bi' Rüzgar was produced by Kaya Müzik. The album contained 3 songs in total. The first music video for the album was released for the song "Sudan Sebep". It was written by Yıldız Tilbe and composed by Gülşen and Ozan Çolakoğlu. Gülşen also worked as a backing vocalist on this song, which was produced by Haluk Şentürk. The video clip was directed by Murad Küçük. The song rose to the top of many music lists. The second music video was released for the song "Veda Gecesi". It was written and composed by Yıldız Tilbe, and Emir's brother Erdi Sevinç shot the video clip in Amsterdam. The video tells the sad story of a separation story. Veli Kuzlu served as the image director. The last song from the album to be made into a music video was "Makina". It was written by Alper Narman and Onur Özdemir. The music video was again directed by his brother Erdi Sevinç and Veli Kuzlu.

Emir's single "Tutuşmayan Kalmasın" was produced by DAO Grup. It was his first single, which was written by Gökhan Şahin and composed by Emrah Karaduman. Its music video was directed by Veli Kuzlu and Murad Küçük, and a number of actors appeared alongside Emir on the video.

=== 2015: Kendimden ===
The producer of his extended play Kendimden was Sony Music and it contained 4 songs. Erdem Kınay, Emrah Karaduman and Turaç Berkay Özer served as the arrangers of the album. The first music video for this EP was made for the song "Bi' Ağla", which was written by Emir himself, and composed by Ceyhun Çelikten and Erdem Kınay. Gülşen again worked as a backing vocalist on the song. Its music video was directed by Murad Küçük and Veli Kuzlu. The shooting took place in the early hours of the morning in Kilyos Kısırkaya Beach began shooting with a technical team of about 35 people. Argentinian Cora Lichtschein appeared alongside Emir in the video. "Bi' Ağla" reached to the top of a number of music charts and was viewed over 3 million times on YouTube. He worked with photographer Emre Ünal for the cartonboard. Other songs on the EP, "Yaylı Yatak" and "Ya Rab", were written by Emir as well. Yıldız Tilbe worked as a backing vocalist on "Yaylı Yatak". It was composed by Turaç Berkay Özer. Another version of the song "Bi' Ağla" was also said to be under development by Ceyhun Çelikten. The second song from the extended play that was made into music video was "Yaylı Yatak". The video was directed by his brother Erdi Sevinç. Eren Yıldız served as director. The video was made with an orchestra made up of cheerful old women, as well as a beautiful Ukrainian model. It was shot in Tophane and Karaköy. Recording the music video lasted about a day.

== Discography ==
=== Studio albums ===
- 2009: Ben Sen Olamam

=== EPs ===
- 2012: Ateşten Bir Rüzgar
- 2014: Kendimden

=== Singles ===
- 2013: "Tutuşmayan Kalmasın"
- 2016: "Mevsim Sonbahar"
- 2017: "Sıkıntı Yok"
- 2018: "Gri"
- 2018: "N'aptın Sevgilim"
- 2019: "Aynen Devam"
- 2020: "Ben Unutmayı Bilmem"
- 2021: "Aklımı Oynatıcam"
- 2022: "Gecenin Yarısı"
- 2022: "Gelme Yanıma"
- 2023: "Nerdesin Aşk"
- 2023: "Gecenin Üçünde"
- 2024: "Çat"

== See also ==
- List of Turkish musicians
