= Bangır Bangır =

Studio album by Gülşen
- Released: 29 April 2015
- Recorded: 2014–2015
- Studios: Kaya Müzik; (Istanbul, Turkey); Matrix Studio Complex; (London, England); Ozinga Productions; (Istanbul, Turkey)
- Genres: Dance; pop
- Length: 39:48
- Label: DMC
- Producer: Ozan Çolakoğlu

Gülşen chronology
Beni Durdursan mı? (2013)	Bangır Bangır (2015)

Bangır Bangır (Loudly Loudly) is the ninth studio album by Turkish singer Gülşen. It was released on 29 April 2015 by Doğan Music Company. Initial information about the album was first discussed in February 2014, and its release date was postponed as Gülşen wrote and composed songs for her colleagues. The recording began in the second half of 2014 at studios in Istanbul and London, and continued until early 2015. Like her previous album Beni Durdursan mı? (2013), Gülşen wrote and composed all of the songs on the album. The songs's arrangements were done by Ozan Çolakoğlu.

A pop album that also contains dance songs, Bangır Bangır's lyrics feature phrases of Turkish slang. The album received mixed reviews from critics. Many accused the singer of repeating the music style of her previous album and some pointed out that she was inspired by Sezen Aksu, which was reflected in the lyrics of the songs. For the album's cover and image, Gülşen took inspiration from Brazilian singer Carmen Miranda's appearance and Mexican artist Frida Kahlo's art works. Some critics, however, left negative comments and compared her image to that of American singer Katy Perry and English singer FKA Twigs.

Three music videos were released for the album. The video for the lead single, "Bangır Bangır", was recorded in Havana, Cuba, and released as the first music video of the album. It became the most-viewed music video on YouTube in Turkey in 2015. It also became the most-searched song on Google in Turkey. The songs topped Türkçe Top 20 for thirteen weeks. The music video for "Dan Dan" was recorded in California, the United States, in which Gülşen appeared in a red swimsuit and boots. RTÜK found Gülşen's appearance and acts in the video similar to "women who give sexual service to men on the phone" and concluded that the clip was harmful for children, which resulted in charging the channels that had broadcast the music video. The third and final music video, "Büyük Hatırın Var", was published two years after the album's release.

Bangır Bangır immediately ranked first on D&R Best-Selling list following its release and sold 100,000 physical copies by the end of 2015, becoming Turkey's second best-selling album of the year. Due to its success, DMC awarded the album with a gold certification. To promote the album, Gülşen gave various concerts in Turkey and Europe. The lead single, "Bangır Bangır", received the Best Music Video and Best Song awards at the 42nd Golden Butterfly Awards, and Gülşen performed the former together with "Dan Dan" at the award ceremony.

== Background and development ==
In 2013, Gülşen released her eighth studio album Beni Durdursan mı?, which was downloaded 366,000 times on digital platforms and sold, 100,000 physical copies, becoming Turkey's best-selling album of the year. She wrote all of the songs on the album by herself, and composed a number of them on her own and the others together with her boyfriend Ozan Çolakoğlu. Çolakoğlu also did the arrangement for the album's songs. Two of those songs, "Yatcaz Kalkcaz Ordayım" and "Kardan Adam", ranked first on Türkçe Top 20 for weeks. In February 2014, it was reported that Gülşen was working on a new studio album, and that it would be released in summer 2015. In the same month, Bugün wrote that due to writing and composing songs for her colleagues she had postponed the album's release date. In April, Gülşen released the single "İltimas", featuring Murat Boz. She also performed the song "Namus" on Ozan Doğulu's 2014 album 130 Bpm Moderato and the song "Emrin Olur" on the album Kayahan'ın En İyileri No.1 (2015).

"It's a different period than when I made the previous album, and over the time many things, including the way I can express my emotions and thoughts, have changed. In my opinion the most dangerous part is to stalk to the success of the previous album and the instinct to repeat the same style in all of the subsequent ones. This causes regression without realizing it. Of course it depends on what path you choose in your career. For example, for those who like to take risks by trying new things like me, it is a way that can never be tried beforehand."

— From Gülşen's interview with Cosmopolitan, 2014

On 3 September 2014, she shared a photograph from Ozan Çolakoğlu's studio on her Twitter account, and announced that she had started recording the new album. On 12 September she tweeted: "I'm greatly impatient to share my new songs with you as soon as possible. I'm now writing these words with so much excitement after just finishing another song." In November, she appeared on the cover of Cosmopolitan, and said that the album would be released in the first half of 2015. To continue working on the album, she moved periodically to London, where she viewed as a source of inspiration. On 19 March, she announced that they were at the final stages of recording the album.

== Music and lyrics ==
Bangır Bangır, an "exciting, moving and cheerful" album in Gülşen's words, is a pop album that contains dance songs. All of the songs were written and composed by Gülşen, except "Büyük Hatırın Var", which was composed together with Ozan Çolakoğlu. Çolakoğlu also served as the album's producer and arranged all of its songs. The recording was done at Kaya Müzik and Ozinga Productions studios in Istanbul and Matrix Studio Complex in London. The audio mastering was performed in New York at the Tom Coyne Sterling Sound. In many major parts of the lyrics phrases of Turkish slang were used.

The album contains 10 songs in total, and for its lead single, also titled "Bangır Bangır", words and phrases of Turkish slang were heavily used. The song's chorus features spoon sounds together with the lyrics "Yavrum kaldır kollarını (Put up your arms babe) / Teslim ol etrafın sarılı (Give up, you're surrounded) / Sabret af çıksın sana (Be patient until you're forgiven) / Ben öptüreceğim bu evin yollarını (I'll make you kiss the paths to this home)". It is followed by the Eurodance song "Bir Fırt Çek", which Yavuz Hakan Tok found similar to the song "Irgalamaz Beni" from her previous album. The third song is titled "Kara Liste", and is followed by "Dan Dan", in which Gülşen threatens to kill herself if her lover does not fulfill her wishes. The fifth song "Ellerinden Öper", which was compared to the song "Kardan Adam", starts with a slow tempo and then turns into a vibrant song. The song that follows it, "Yıkım Kararı", also has a slow tempo, and according to Naim Dilmener, with its lyrics it's the most striking part of the album. The seventh song, "Büyük Hatırın Var", is a Eurodance song on which Çolakoğlu, is listed as the featuring artist. In the fast-paced song "Parti Kur Oy Vereyim" Gülşen describes her fanaticism to the person she loves. The two final songs are "En Sevdiğim Yanlışım" and "Can Yeleğim", both of which have slow tempos.

== Cover and release ==
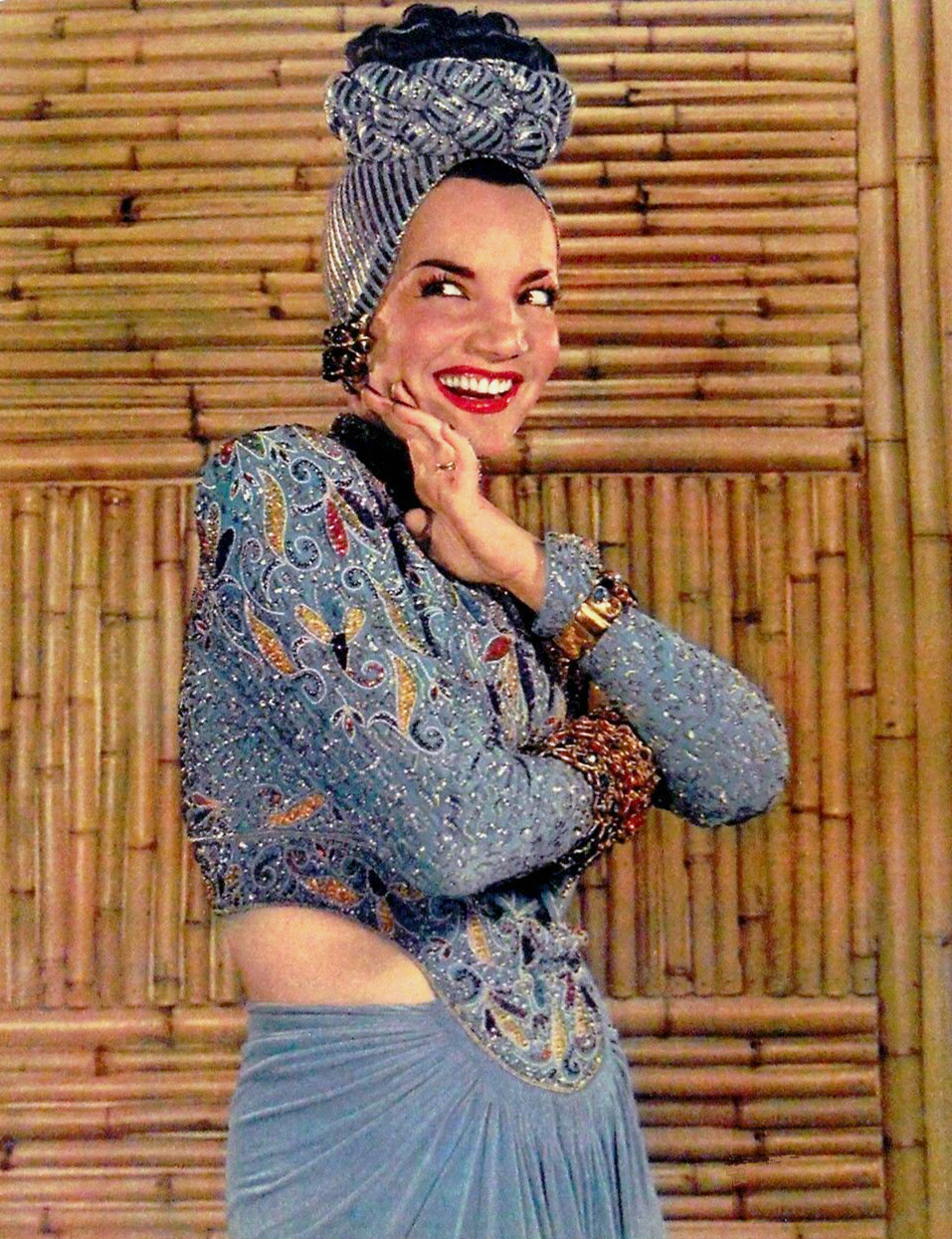
Brazilian singer Carmen Miranda was a source of inspiration for Gülşen's photographs on the album's cover.

The album's cover was released on 24 April 2015 on Twitter. The photographs were taken by Emre Ünal and Bahar Kongel Fransez served as the singer's stylist. She took inspiration from "exotic women" Carmen Miranda and Frida Kahlo for her work. The drawings on the album's cover and photographs were prepared by Pelin Kırca. Naim Dilmener found the album's cover strange, and wrote in his review: "To make it look like a painting, Gülşen has used the maximum number of colors possible, then pulled her belly out and looks straight toward us. They have confused the meaning of exotic with forest-like, and interpreted forest as monkey. There are two monkeys on the cover. They have probably decided that two is enough, cause three would have turned the meaning of the cover into something else; Gülşen's outfit combination is not suitable for that background either." After releasing the photographs, Gülşen's appearance was also compared to Katy Perry's in the music video for "Roar". Sabah newspaper wrote in its review: "After taking some photos with monkeys in Cuba and realizing their similarity to Perry's appearance with monkeys in the jungle, the singer decided to publish other photographs in the press." Some critics compared her overall appearance to English singer FKA Twigs. Actress Yasemin Allen wrote in her review for Sözcü: "I'm against using alternative images from different genres when making a pop album. It is considered a little bit scabby by different masses of people. I still stand behind what I have said before. The image of Turkish pop singers is not uniform."

Bangır Bangır was released on 29 April 2015 by Doğan Music Company in CD format and on digital platforms, and made available for digital download worldwide. The album ranked first on D&R Best-Selling list and topped the iTunes digital sales list in Turkey. By the end of 2015, the album sold 60,000 copies in CD format, and the number rose to 80,000 in September. After selling 100,000 copies by the end of the year, it became the second best-selling album in Turkey after Demet Akalın's Pırlanta, which sold only 5,000 more copies. Due to its successful performance on sales charts, DMC awarded the album with a gold certification. Bangır Bangır also received the Best Album award at the KKTC Cypaparazzi Awards and the Haliç University Bests of the Year Awards. It was also nominated for the same award at the Radio Boğaziçi Music Awards. By the end of 2015, the album was streamed over 10 million times on TTNET Müzik, and the site chose it as the "Album of the Year". iTunes Store Türkiye also chose it as the "Best Pop Album" in Turkey.

== Critical reception ==
Bangır Bangır received mixed reviews from music critics. Hürriyet's Naim Dilmener gave the album two out of five, and stated that all of the songs and compositions were under the influence of Beni Durdursan mı?'s lead single "Yatcaz Kalkcaz Ordayım". He also stated that many of the songs "contain lyrics and phrases similar to the songs written by Sezen Aksu for Tarkan and composed by Çolakoğlu for him during the golden period of his career. They also contain abundant quotations and slogans." He also found Gülşen's vocals in "'Bir Fırt Çek' similar to Demet Akalın's vocal tone." Writing for Hayat Müzik, Yavuz Hakan Tok also gave the album a negative review. Aside from the album's lead single, he found the other songs similar to their predecessors in Beni Durdursan mı?, believing that they bear the "same formulas, same mathematics, similar lyrics and melody". He wrote that the songs were not any different from the singer's previous works and "nothing has changed on Gülşen's front line." Dikkat Müzik's Olcay Tanberken wrote that "When looking at the album as a whole, we don't see a 'new' Gülşen, and we even feel sad for her over-repetition."

Writing for the website Dilimin Ayarı Yok, Cem Özsancak found the album weak compared to its predecessor Beni Durdursan mı?, and wrote "Bangır Bangır, shows that Gülşen's going slowly toward repeating herself or that she does not have anything new to offer." Habertürk's Esin Övet found the album "beautiful in general" and pointed out to the "Sezen Aksu taste" in the songs. He also said that by releasing Bangır Bangır "the singer has taken herself one step forward as she had done with her other albums." Milliyet's DJ Suat Kavukluoğlu stated that Gülşen can "analyze music's beating pulse and figure out the mathematics of making hit songs", and said that the album "contains songs that are written using Turkish slang, just like Sezen Aksu and Nazan Öncel's 'Şımarık', 'Seni Yerler' and 'Erkekler de Yanar', all of which were fiery songs." Gzone's Mert Bell, gave the album a positive review and mentioned the singer's ability in songwriting as "the most important reason for her success." He also wrote that "In this album, Ozan Çolakoğlu's formulas on Gülşen's songs continue to appear with minor changes."

== Promotion ==
=== Live performances ===
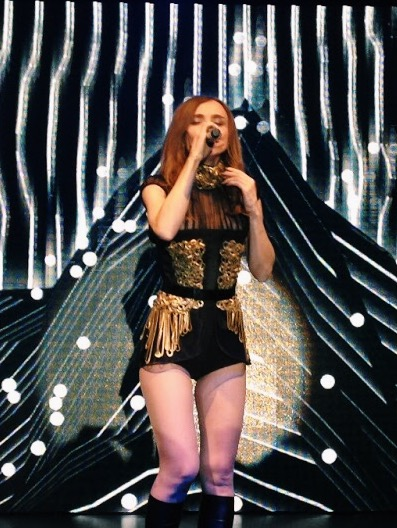
To promote the album, Gülşen gave concerts across Turkey and Europe.

To promote Bangır Bangır after its release, Gülşen gave concerts in various places in Turkey in 2015 and 2016. In May she went on the first tour of her concerts for the album and performed for more than 400,000 people in total. In September 2015, she performed for 6,000 people at the Cemil Topuzlu Open-Air Theatre, and in April 2016 she gave a concert at the Bostancı Show Center in front of an audience of 3,000 people. Aside from her concerts in Turkey in 2015, she also performed in Bochum, Brussels, Munich and Vienna, and later from January to April 2016, she went on a tour in Europe and gave 25 concerts in total. According to Bugün, the singer earned €40,000 from each of these events, and made ₺2.6 million in total. In November 2015, she performed the songs "Dan Dan" and "Bangır Bangır" at the 42nd Golden Butterfly Awards.

=== Music videos ===
The album's first music video was made for the lead single "Bangır Bangır" in Havana, Cuba. It was directed by Metin Arolat, and shot over the course of three days. The video was first streamed on 28 April 2015 and by the end of 2015 became the most-viewed Turkish music video on YouTube. In September 2016, it surpassed 200 million views on the platform. "Bangır Bangır" also became the most-searched song on Google in Turkey in 2015. The song entered Türkçe Top 20 and topped the chart from 7 May until 7 August, remaining number-one for thirteen weeks. The song received the Best Music Video and Best Song award at the 42nd Golden Butterfly Awards.

Gülşen's appearance in a red outfit combined with her body movements while she was talking over the phone in the music video for "Dan Dan", prompted RTÜK to issue a statement and ban the video from being broadcast on music channels.

The music video for "Dan Dan" was released on 10 August 2015. The video, which cost Gülşen $150,000, was directed by Koray Birand in California and shot over the course of five hours. Norwegian model Helge accompanied Gülşen on the video. Portraying a woman who looks for her love, Gülşen appeared with a red swimsuit and boot in the video. The video was viewed over 85 million times by September 2016, and the song itself rose up to number three on Turkey's official music chart. In March 2016, the agency that monitors radio and television in Turkey, RTÜK, prepared a report about the video and charged Dream Türk, Kral Pop TV, Number One TV and PowerTürk TV for broadcasting the music video. In the report, they mentioned that the video was "physically, mentally, and morally harmful for children and teenagers", and Gülşen's "appearance in a red swimsuit, together with showing her body and her movements on the bed, resembles women who give sexual services to their friends over the phone." Gülşen responded to the report by describing it as "a heavy assault on the honor of womanhood" and said that it was "an unacceptably ugly analogy and an insult to her as an individual." In May, Dream Türk started to stream the music video again and was charged ₺14,359.

The music video for "Büyük Hatırın Var" was released on 20 July 2017. The video was again directed by Koray Birand in Istanbul over the course of two days. The song entered Turkey's official list of Fastest Rising Songs as number one.

== Track listing ==
All of the songs were written and composed by Gülşen. "Büyük Hatırın Var" was composed together with Ozan Çolakoğlu.

No.	Title	Length
1.	"Bangır Bangır"	3:54
2.	"Bir Fırt Çek"	4:23
3.	"Kara Liste"	3:35
4.	"Dan Dan"	3:16
5.	"Ellerinden Öper"	4:27
6.	"Yıkım Kararı"	3:29
7.	"Büyük Hatırın Var" (feat. Ozan Çolakoğlu)	4:47
8.	"Parti Kur Oy Vereyim"	4:14
9.	"En Sevdiğim Yanlışım"	4:01
10.	"Can Yeleği"	3:42
Total length:		39:48

== Personnel ==
- Gülşen – singer-songwriter, supervisor
- Ozan Çolakoğlu – arranger, composer, producer, mixing, programming, keyboard, spoon
- Doğan Music Company – production
- Caner Güneysu – guitar
- Mehmet Akatay – percussion
- Alp Ersönmez – bass
- Ali Yılmaz – oud, cümbüş, bağlama
- Atınç Tombak – backing vocals (1, 4, 6, 9)
- Ercüment Vural – backing vocals (1, 5)
- Osman Çetin – backing vocals (3, 7, 8); recording
- Emre Kıral – mixing
- Emre Ünal – photography
- Bahar Kongel Fransez – style, creative director
- Pelin Kırca – drawings
- Suat Can Beldek – graphic design
- Serkan Aktük – hair
- Melis İlkkılıç – make-up
- Derya Şahin – nail art
- GD Ofset – printing

Credits adapted from Bangır Bangır's album booklet.

== Charts ==
Chart (2015)	Peak position
Turkey (D&R Best-Selling)	1

== Sales ==
Country	Certification	Sales
Turkey (DMC)	Gold (Note: The certification was not given by Turkey's official music producers association MÜ-YAP, but by the album's production company DMC. DMC only awards its own artists, while MÜ-YAP awards the best-selling artists in general.)	100,000

== Release history ==
Country	Date	Format(s)	Label	Ref.
Turkey	29 April 2015	CD · digital download	Doğan Music Company	
Worldwide	29 April 2015	Digital download	Doğan Music Company	
Turkey	9 November 2020	LP	Doğan Music Company	
