= Çağla Akalın =

Turkish actress and activist

- Born: 17 June 1990 (age 35); Istanbul, Turkey
- Occupations: Actress, model
- Years active: 2013–present

Çağla Akalın (born 17 June 1990) is a Turkish actress, model, columnist, singer, and human rights activist.

In 2013, she became the first trans beauty pageant title holder at the Miss Queen competition for transgender women in Turkey. She is also Turkey's first transgender model. In 2013, she revealed in an interview with Hürriyet that she had chosen her first name and surname after model Çağla Şıkel and singer Demet Akalın, respectively.

In 2015, with her role in the movie Köpek, Akalın became Turkey's first transgender actress to get a leading role.
