= Petek Dinçöz =

Turkish actress and singer

- Born: Didem Ezgü; 29 May 1980 (age 46); İzmir, Turkey
- Genres: Pop; fantezi
- Occupations: Singer; TV presenter; actress; model
- Years active: 1997–present
- Labels: OMG; Universal; S; Özden; Erol Köse; Esen; Seyhan; DMC; Kaya; Dao Grup; İdobay; Türküola

Didem Ezgü (born 29 May 1980), better known by her stage name Petek Dinçöz, is a Turkish singer, former model, actress and TV presenter.

== Biography ==
Petek Dinçöz was born on 29 May 1980 in İzmir to Esra Suay and Müjdat Fahri Ezgü. Her father died when she was a child. She has a younger brother, named Necdet. Dinçöz studied at the Gazi Middle School and lived in İzmir until the age of 14. She stopped her education to pursue a career in modelling. In 1997, she participated at a beauty pageant in Cyprus and finished second. After being discovered by Atilla Kaplakarslan, she was trained in modelling for two years before competing in the 1999 Cyprus Beauty Pageant where she was selected as the Press Beauty. In 1998, Dinçöz started modelling and the next year she joined the cast of the Sırılsıklam TV series. In 2000, she was cast in the Zehirli Çiçek TV series alongside Tuğba Özay and Çağla Şıkel. She then co-presented a TV program together with Mehmet Ali Erbil. She started her career as a singer in 2002 by releasing her first studio album Aşkın Tam Sırası, which sold 49,000 copies. With this album, she won the Best Debut by a Female Artist award at the 8th Kral TV Video Music Awards.

In 2008, she married Can Tanrıyar but divorced two years later, citing irreconcilable differences. On 8 July 2014, she married Serkan Kodaloğlu, with whom she has a son. The couple divorced on 15 March 2022. On 8 August 2022, Dinçöz became engaged to business manager Nida Büyükbayrakdar. They were married on 16 August 2022 in Beşiktaş.

== Discography ==
=== Albums ===
1. Aşkın Tam Sırası (2002)
2. Sen Değmezsin (2003)
3. Şaka Gibi (2004)
4. Doktor Tavsiyesi (2005)
5. Remixlerle Nonstop İstanbul Geceleri (2006)
6. Yolun Açık Olsun (2007)
7. Arım Balım Peteğim (2007)
8. Frekans (2008)
9. Ne Yapayım Şimdi Ben (2009)
10. Yalanı Boşver (2011)
11. Milat (2013)

=== Singles ===
1. "Bende Kaldı" (2001)
2. "Foolish Casanova" (2002)
3. "Kördüğüm" (2006)
4. "Bana Uyar" (2009)
5. "İşte Böyle Morarırsın" (2010)
6. "In The Eyes" (2012)
7. "Çekil" (2012)
8. "Vibe & Rate" (2012)
9. "Tadilat" (2014)
10. "Eşi Benzeri Yok" (2015)
11. "Teşekkürler" (2016)
12. "Gel O Zaman" (2016)
13. "Haydi Şimdi Gel" (feat. Cihat Uğurel) (2016)
14. "Kabusun Olurum" (2018)
15. "Eshgham" (Aşkım) (feat. Shahyad) (2018)
16. "Çılgınlar Gibi" (2022)
17. "Sevgi Arsızı" (2022)
18. "Sensiz Bu Yaz" (2022)
19. "Büyük Ustam" (2022)
20. "Tanımam" (2023)
21. "Gel Benim Ol" (feat. Ümit Yaşar) (2023)
22. "Gül Belalıdır" (2023)
23. "Yandırdın Kalbimi" (2023)
24. "Seni Kalbimden Kovdum" (2024)
25. "Serserim Benim" (2024)
26. "Ahımı Ala Ala" (2024)
27. "Unut (Kolay Olmayacak)" (2024)
28. "Bam Bam" (2025)
29. "Nereden Sevdim O Zalimi" (2025)

== Filmography ==
=== TV series ===
- Sırılsıklam (1998)
- Zehirli Çiçek (2000)
- Bir Yıldız Tutuldu (Yıldız) (2002)
- Nehir (2005)
- Teyzanne (guest appearance) (2009)
- Roman Havası (2014)

=== Film ===
- Keloğlan Kara Prens'e Karşı (Can Kız) (2005)
- Babamın Kemanı (Güliz) (2022)

=== TV programs ===
- Arım Balım Peteğim (2007–2008; 2010–2011; 2015)
- Petek'le 10 Numara (2010)
- Çarkıfelek (2011)

== Awards ==
Year	Award	Category
1997	Best Model	Second place
1998	Mankenlik Awards	1998 Best Model
2002	8th Kral TV Video Music Awards	Best Debut by a Female Artist
2002	30th Golden Butterfly Awards	Best Debut by a Soloist
2003	9th Kral TV Video Music Awards	Best Female Arabesque-Fantezi Artist
2004	10th Kral TV Video Music Awards	Best Female Arabesque-Fantezi Artist
2006	12th Kral TV Video Music Awards	Duet of the Year (Doğum Günü)
2006		Best Maxi Single (Kördüğüm)
2008	Istanbul Aydın University 4th İletişim Awards	Best Daily Program (Arım Balım Peteğim)
2009	Rekort Magazine Awards	Best Program
2009	Radio and Television Media Oscars	Best Daily Program
2009	European Journalists Association Awards	Best Program (Arım Balım Peteğim)
2011	Siyaset Magazine Awards	Best Daily Program (Arım Balım Peteğim)
2011	European Union Quality Awards	Best Daily Program (Arım Balım Peteğim)
2011	Karadeniz Foundation Awards	Best Daily Program (Arım Balım Peteğim)
2012		Best Presenter of the Year (Çarkıfelek)
2014	Unimpeded Life Foundation Awards	Best Music Video (Aşk)
2015	Unimpeded Life Foundation Awards	Appreciation Plaque
