= Of... Of... =

Studio album by Gülşen
- Released: 28 September 2004
- Genre: Pop
- Length: 46:35
- Label: Erol Köse Production

Gülşen chronology
Şimdi (2001)	Of... Of... (2004)	2005 Özel: Of... Of... Albümü ve Remixler (2005)

Of... Of... (Ugh... Ugh...) is the fourth studio album by Turkish singer Gülşen. The album has been credited for bringing the breakthrough in her career, after which she received an offer from Ala Bianca Records to produce an album in Italy.

== Reception ==
Radio broadcaster Michael Kuyucu described it as "The best of Gülşen's career [up to now]". The album sold 335,000 copies in Turkey and Gülşen was chosen as the Best Female Pop Singer at the 11th Turkey Music Awards. Milliyet wrote on its review for the album, "The singer Gülşen, who had not been seen anywhere while married to Murat Varol, has changed completely after she left her husband. With her sexy image and new album, Gülşen has risen to stardom."

In response to the comments on her new sexy image in the album, Gülşen said: "A person who thinks that you can achieve success just by looking sexy is very wrong. Looking sexy is one part of your work. You don't have to wear open clothes. You can be sexy with the way you look. Beauty alone means nothing."

The song "Of Of", written and composed by Nazan Öncel, became a hit in Turkey and was eventually chosen as the Song of the Year at the 11th Turkey Music Awards. Gülşen commented on the overwhelming success of the song in an interview: "We believed in the power of this song. I knew it'd get this much attention. In a very short time, we received more attention than we expected. I'm experiencing the best days of my professional life."

== Music videos ==
After the release of a music video for "Of Of", three more music videos were made for the songs "Sakıncalı", "Nazar Değmesin" and "Sarışınım". The music video for "Sarışınım" was considered erotic by the Radio and Television Supreme Council, who said it "is contrary to social values and leads to sexual abuse". Kral TV and Number 1 TV were both charged for broadcasting the music video.

== Track listing ==
No.	Title	Writer(s)	Composer(s)	Length
1.	"Of Of"	Nazan Öncel	Nazan Öncel	3:24
2.	"Yaklaşanı Yakarım"	Gülşen	Gülşen	4:18
3.	"Sakıncalı (Acoustic Version)"	Gülşen	Gülşen	4:01
4.	"Sarışınım"	Aysel Gürel	Ara Dinkjian	3:04
5.	"İlgilenmiyorum (Retro Version)"	Gülşen	Gülşen	4:25
6.	"Tek Taraflı"	Gülşen	Gülşen	3:40
7.	"Aşk Kadını"	Gülşen	Gülşen	3:09
8.	"Buz"	Gülşen	Gülşen	4:30
9.	"Nazar Değmesin"	Gülşen	Gülşen	4:38
10.	"Alnının Yazısı"	Gülşen	Gülşen	3:42
11.	"İlgilenmiyorum (Club Version)"	Gülşen	Gülşen	3:52
12.	"Sakıncalı (Depressive Version)"	Gülşen	Gülşen	3:48
Total length:				46:35

== Personnel ==
- Production: Erol Köse Production
- Producer: Erol Köse
- General Music Director: Tufan Taş
- Photographs: Zeynel Abidin Ağgül
- Graphic Design: Özlem Semiz
- Printing: FRS Matbaacılık
