= Önsöz =

Studio album by Gülşen
- Released: 22 December 2009
- Studio: Sarı Ev; (Istanbul, Turkey)
- Genre: Pop
- Length: 45:20
- Label: Arista; Sony
- Producer: Ozan Çolakoğlu

Gülşen chronology
| Ama Bir Farkla (2007) | Önsöz (2009) | Beni Durdursan mı? (2013) |

Önsöz (Foreword) is the seventh studio album by Turkish singer Gülşen. It was released on 22 December 2009 by Arista Records and Sony Music Entertainment.

== Content and release ==
The album consisted of 11 songs in total, ten of which were written and composed by Gülşen herself, who took inspiration from the events in her own life when preparing the lyrics. It was recorded at Sarı Ev studios and produced and arranged by Ozan Çolakoğlu. Aside from its new songs, the album contains a cover of "Dillere Düşeceğiz Seninle", which was originally performed by Nazan Öncel for her 1994 album Ben Böyle Aşk Görmedim. The songs "Bi' An Gel" and "Ezberbozan" ranked first and third on Türkçe Top 20 respectively. "Önsöz" and "Dillere Düşeceğiz Seninle" were also among the top 10 on the official chart, occupying the sixth and tenth place respectively.

== Music videos ==
Nihat Odabaşı directed three of the album's four music videos: "Bi' An Gel", "Ezberbozan", and "Dillere Düşeceğiz Seninle". The music video for "Ezberbozan" was shot at Film Sokağı in Istanbul. Her new image and appearance in the video was compared by some to that of American actress Marilyn Monroe. For the hippie-themed music video of the song "Önsöz", Gülşen worked with the stylist Ceyda Balaban. The music video was directed by Murat Onbul.

== Reception ==
Mehmet Tez of Milliyet praised the graphic design and style of the album's cover, and found it suitable for Gülşen's style. He also believed that her collaboration with Ozan Çolakoğlu was a key factor for the album's success, yet added that she should avoid putting songs from completely different genres in one album.

== Track listing ==
All of the songs were written and composed by Gülşen, unless stated otherwise.

| No. | Title | Writer(s) | Composer(s) | Length |
|---|---|---|---|---|
| 1. | "Bi' An Gel" | | Gülşen · Ozan Çolakoğlu | 4:13 |
| 2. | "İade" | | | 4:26 |
| 3. | "Tamamen Yanılsama" | | | 4:44 |
| 4. | "Önsöz" | | | 3:12 |
| 5. | "Ezberbozan" | | | 3:49 |
| 6. | "Bir Taraf Seç" | | | 4:35 |
| 7. | "Uyan da Gidelim" | | | 4:17 |
| 8. | "Arkadaş Kalalım" | | Gülşen · Çolakoğlu | 4:11 |
| 9. | "Hükmen Mağlup" | | | 4:08 |
| 10. | "Yukarıdan Ayarlı" | | | 4:07 |
| 11. | "Dillere Düşeceğiz Seninle" | Nazan Öncel | Öncel | 3:38 |
| Total length: | | | | 45:20 |

== Personnel ==
- Gülşen – singer-songwriter
- Ozan Çolakoğlu – producer, composer (1, 8), arranger, keyboard, programming, backing vocals (2)
- Nazan Öncel – songwriter (11)
- Erdem Sökmen – guitar (1, 3–6, 8–11)
- Mehmet Akatay – percussion (1, 2, 4, 5, 9–11)
- Ömer Aslan – percussion (1, 2, 11)
- Cengiz Ercümer – percussion (10)
- Fatih Ahıskalı – oud, cümbüş, gittern (1, 3, 9, 11)
- Ahmet Türkmenoğlu – bass (5, 10)
- Motor Ali Yılmaz – bağlama
- Gündem – Bowed string instruments (1–7, 9–11)
- Özgür Yurtoğlu – electric guitar (2, 7)
- Serdar Barçın – flute (5)
- Eyüp Hamiş – ney (1, 4, 11), kaval (1, 4, 11)
- Cihan Okan – backing vocals (1, 2, 4, 5, 7, 8, 10, 11)
- Eda Pala – backing vocals (1, 2, 4, 5, 7, 8, 10, 11)
- Ercüment Vural – backing vocals (1, 2, 4, 5, 7, 8, 10, 11)
- Yeşim Vatan – backing vocals (1, 2, 4, 5, 7, 8, 10, 11)
- Emir – backing vocals (2)
- Kaan – backing vocals (2)
- Emirhan Cengiz – recording
- Seda Seber – recording
- Bahadır Sağdaş – string instruments group recording
- Özgür Yurtoğlu – mixing
- Chris V. Rautenkranz – mastering
- Nihat Odabaşı – photographs, graphic design
- Ceyda Balaban – image, concept
- Seyit Karakaş – hair
- Yıldırım Özdemir – hair
- Erkan Uluç – make-up
- Republica – graphic design
- Onur Ofset – printing

Credits adapted from Önsöz's album booklet.

== Release history ==
| Country | Date | Format | Label | Ref. |
|---|---|---|---|---|
| Turkey | 22 December 2009 | CD · Digital download | Sony Music Entertainment | |
| Worldwide | 22 December 2009 | Digital download | Sony Music Entertainment | |
