= Yurtta Aşk Cihanda Aşk =

Studio album by Gülşen
- Released: 20 February 2006
- Genre: Pop, electropop
- Length: 1:16:58
- Label: Erol Köse Exclusive
- Director: Suat Aydoğan

Gülşen chronology
2005 Özel (2005)	Yurtta Aşk Cihanda Aşk (2006)	Mucize (2007)

Yurtta Aşk Cihanda Aşk (Love at Home Love in the World) is the fifth studio album by Turkish singer Gülşen. It was released in February 2006 by Erol Köse Exclusive and its title was inspired by Mustafa Kemal Atatürk's motto of "Yurtta sulh, cihanda sulh" (Peace at Home, Peace in the World). It was Gülşen's last album to be produced and released by Erol Köse Exclusive, after which she signed a new contract with Rec By Saatchi.

== Achievements ==
The album ranked number one on D&R's list of best-selling albums, and sold 171,000 copies in Turkey, receiving a gold certification from Mü-Yap. Three music videos were made for the songs "Ya Tutarsa", "Yurtta Aşk Cihanda Aşk" and "Canın Sağolsun", the first of which rose to the top 5 on Türkçe Top 20, while the second one became a number-one hit. "En Şahanesinden" ranked fourth on the official chart.

== Ya Tutarsa music video ==
The music video for "Ya Tutarsa" was released in 2006. It was directed by Murat Gönüllü and shot at a club in Milan. Gülşen stated that she played in the video together with "150 European champion dancers, all of whom have played in Madonna's clips". Ebru Çapa, who evaluated the song negatively in her article for Hürriyet, stated that she did not find Gülşen's words convincing, and that Gülşen had tried to appear with a lot of "sex appeal" in the video. Oben Budak from Sabah believed that the song was not "a song that could give us what we expected". The song was first offered to Hande Yener when she was under contract with Erol Köse, but Yener decided against performing it.

== Track listing ==
No.	Title	Writer(s)	Composer(s)	Length
1.	"Ya Tutarsa"	Altan Çetin	Altan Çetin	3:55
2.	"Canın Sağolsun"	Halil Koçak	Halil Koçak	4:47
3.	"Ayrılığın Düğünü"	Gülşen	Gülşen	5:41
4.	"Yurtta Aşk Cihanda Aşk"	Halil Koçak	Halil Koçak	4:15
5.	"Kuş Tüyü"	Halil Koçak	Halil Koçak	6:23
6.	"Son Perde"	Kutsi	Kutsi	3:29
7.	"Çelişki"	Halil Koçak	Halil Koçak	4:23
8.	"Ne Kavgam Bitti Ne Sevdam"	Aysel Gürel	Sezen Aksu	3:40
9.	"Bana Aşkından Öte Köy Yok"	Gülşen	Gülşen	4:22
10.	"Bu Gece"	Halil Koçak	Halil Koçak	3:53
11.	"En Şahanesinden"	Gülşen	Gülşen	3:24
12.	"Kış Yaşattın"	Halil Koçak	Halil Koçak	4:23
13.	"Film"	Halil Koçak	Halil Koçak	4:38
14.	"Haksız Yenilgi"	Gökhan Şahin	Ceyhun Çelikten	4:55
15.	"En Şahanesinden (Remix)"	Gülşen	Gülşen	4:24
16.	"Yurtta Aşk Cihanda Aşk (Remix)"	Halil Koçak	Halil Koçak	4:36
17.	"Ne Kavgam Bitti Ne Sevdam (Remix)"	Aysel Gürel	Sezen Aksu	3:26
Total length:				1:16:58
