= Cemil Topuzlu =

Turkish politician and surgeon (1866–1958)

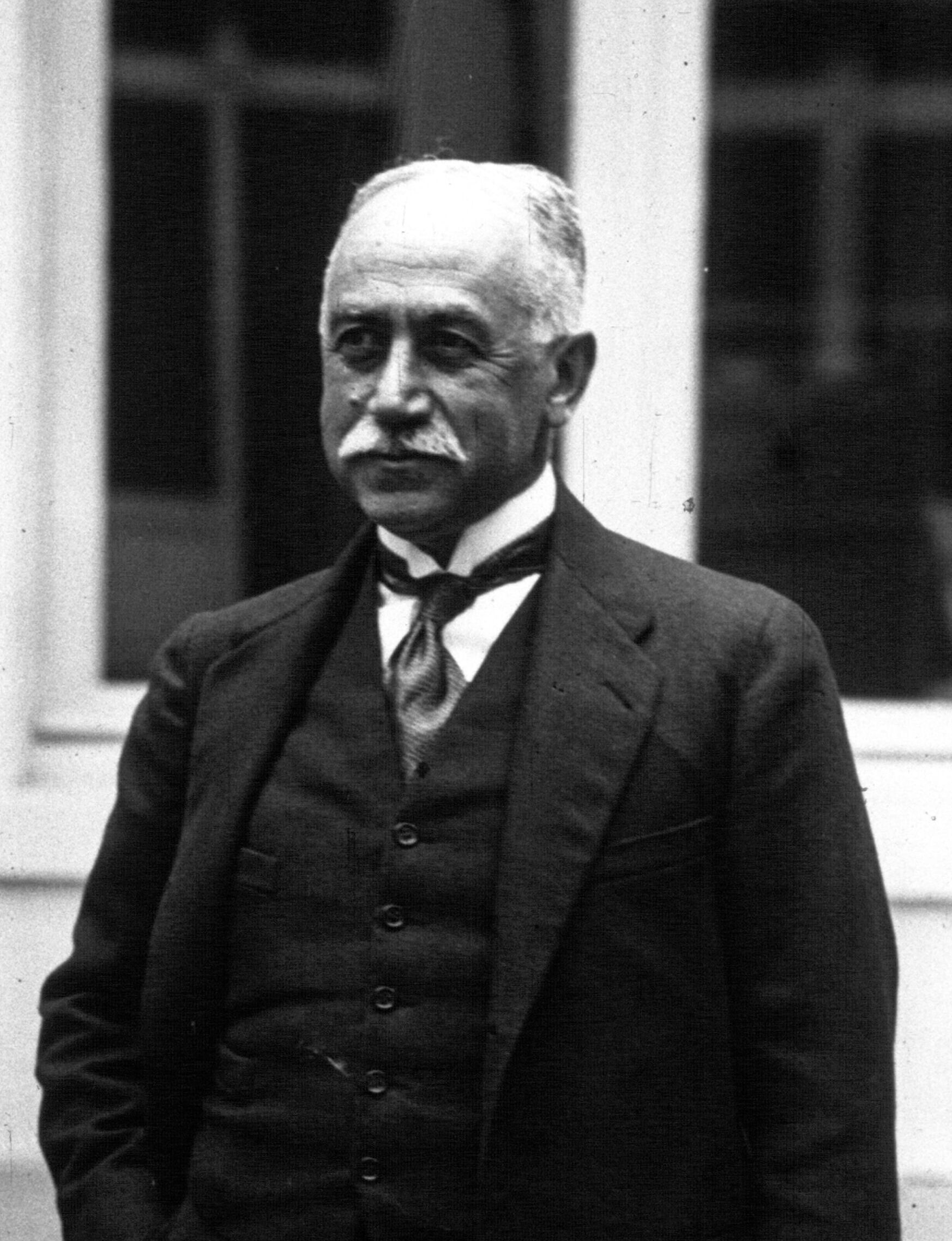
- Cemil Pasha in 1920

Personal details
- Born: 18 March 1866 Istanbul, Ottoman Empire
- Died: 25 January 1958 (aged 91) Istanbul, Turkey
- Occupation: Physician, politician

Professor Cemil Topuzlu (18 March 1866 – 25 January 1958), also known as Cemil Pasha, was a Turkish social democratic politician who served two terms as mayor of Istanbul. During his time in office he oversaw major developments in the city, including the creation of Gülhane Park.

He was also a leading surgeon in Turkey, who was internationally recognised for his pioneering work in several areas, including open chest cardiac massage, and described in several papers published in Ottoman Turkish (later in modern Turkish), French and German.

== Career ==
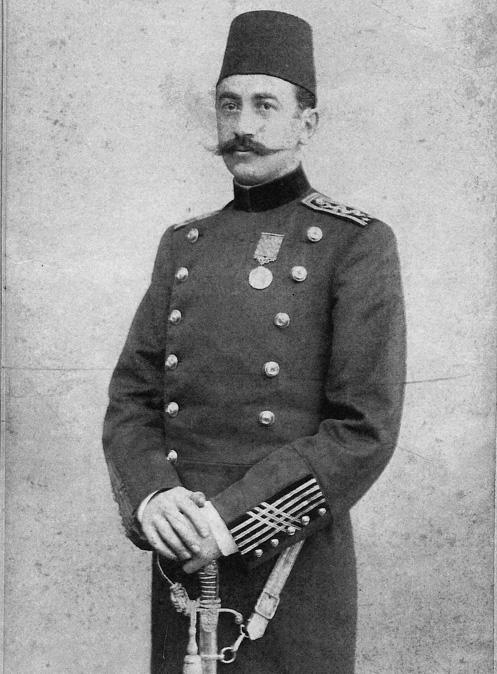
Cemil Topuzlu during his military service

On 27 August 1903, one of his patients undergoing external urethrotomy under chloroform anaesthesia developed cardiac arrest, and he performed open chest cardiac massage. He also defined the "Do not resuscitate" code in cases involving serious heart disease and other diseases, where life expectancy is very short. He introduced novel vascular suture techniques, which he presented at the International Medical Congress in Moscow in August 1897 and at the annual Congress of the Société de Chirurgie de Paris in July 1904, where he reported two cases of arterial tear during breast carcinoma resection and repair within the same session. He also reported the removal of a pen cover from the right main bronchus of a 7-year-old girl through a tracheotomy in 1903.

Early in his career, he worked for three years as an assistant of the French surgeon Jules-Émile Péan, and then became a preferred surgeon of the Ottoman Imperial family in Istanbul. He later served as Mayor of Istanbul and Construction Minister in the late Ottoman period at the beginning of the 20th century, returning to his main specialty, surgery, in the latter part of his life.

== Legacy ==
In recognition for his contributions as an eminent citizen and mayor, an avenue in Kadıköy district of Istanbul, Opr. Cemil Topuzlu Cad., carries his name. A major open-air theatre in Istanbul, the Cemil Topuzlu Open-Air Theatre (Turkish: Cemil Topuzlu Açıkhava Tiyatrosu) with 3,975-seat capacity was completed in 1947; it is located in the Harbiye neighbourhood of Şişli on the European side of the city, across from the Istanbul Lütfi Kırdar International Convention and Exhibition Center and behind the Hilton Istanbul Bosphorus. The park along the Bosphorus in the Kuruçeşme district of Beşiktaş, Istanbul is also named Cemil Topuzlu Park.

== See also ==
- Cemil Topuzlu Open-Air Theatre
