= Mucize (album) =

Demo album by Gülşen
- Released: 29 May 2007
- Genre: Pop
- Length: 46:56
- Label: Erol Köse

Gülşen chronology
Yurtta Aşk Cihanda Aşk (2006)	Mucize (2007)	Ama Bir Farkla (2007)

Mucize (Miracle) is a demo album by Turkish singer Gülşen. It was released on 29 May 2007 by Erol Köse Production without Gülşen's permission and after she controversially terminated her contract with the company. Gülşen applied to the court to stop the distribution of the album and argued that Köse, who released the album and used the compositions without permission, was trying to hinder her work as she was preparing to release Ama Bir Farkla. Despite the legal issues, the album sold 104,000 copies and became one of the top 10 best-selling albums of 2007 in Turkey.

== Track listing ==
No.	Title	Writer(s)	Composer(s)	Length
1.	"Adı Aşk Sebebimin"	A. Fuat Tekin	Tekin	3:38
2.	"3 Dakikada 3 Paralık"	Kutsi	Kutsi	4:31
3.	"Mucize"	Altan Çetin	Çetin	4:43
4.	"Anlayacaksın"	Tekin	Tekin	5:20
5.	"Ben, Güneş, Yıldızlar"	Tekin	Tekin	4:05
6.	"Önce Sen Sev"	Ahmet Selçuk İlkan	Selami Şahin	4:04
7.	"Hesabı Tez Sorulmalı"	Tekin	Tekin	4:51
8.	"Üç Gün Sürmüş"	Tekin	Tekin	4:34
9.	"Adı Aşk Sebebimin" (Acoustic)	Tekin	Tekin	3:35
10.	"Anlayacaksın" (Acoustic)	Tekin	Tekin	3:40
11.	"Megamix"	"Hesabı Tez Sorulmalı": A. Fuat Tekin; "Bu Gece": Halil Çolak; "Of Of": Nazan Öncel		3:49
Total length:				46:56
