= Emre Altuğ =

Turkish pop singer and actor

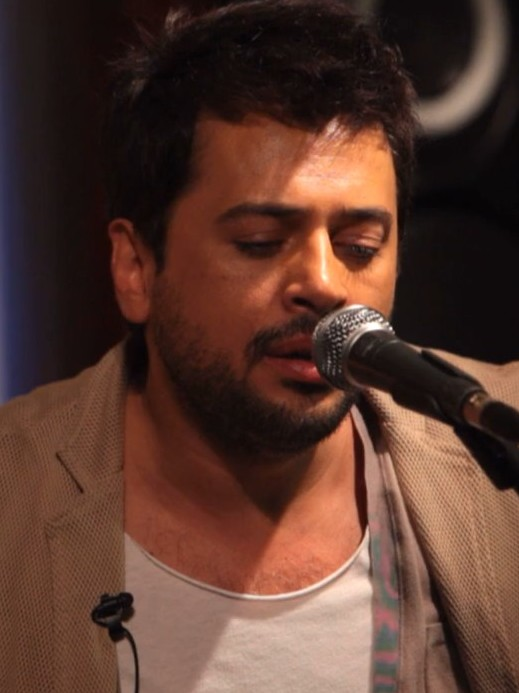
- Altuğ in 2012

Background information
- Born: Niyazi Emre Altuğ; 14 April 1970 (age 56); Levent, Istanbul, Turkey
- Genres: Pop, rock, dance-pop
- Occupations: Singer-songwriter actor performer
- Instruments: Vocals, guitar
- Years active: 1993–present
- Labels: Topkapı; Prestij; Müyada; Raks; DSM; DMC; Dokuz Sekiz; Poll; Avrupa
- Website: Official website

Niyazi Emre Altuğ (born 14 April 1970) is a Turkish actor and singer.

== Biography ==
Emre Altug was born in Levent, Beşiktaş, Istanbul as the second son to a housewife mother and dentist father. His family is of Niğde origin. He graduated from theatre department of Istanbul University State Conservatory. He is best known for films, theatre sketches "Güldür Güldür" (as different roles) and series "Tatlı Hayat" Turkish remake of The Jeffersons, youth series "Lise Defteri", "Elde Var Hayat", fantasy child series "Sihirli Annem".

He acted on stage in various plays and sang backing vocals to such established artists like Sezen Aksu, Sertab Erener, Levent Yüksel and Nilüfer, before his first album, titled İbreti Alem was released on 28 August 1998. In July 2000 he sang a song called Bir de bana sor for Melih Kibar 's album entitled Yadigar. The song became a huge hit with radio stations. His second album, Sıcak was released on 3 March 2003. In the meantime he appeared in commercials, television films and feature films, like Kolay Para. His third album, Dudak Dudağa came out in 2004, followed by Sensiz Olmuyor a year later. The song, which the album was named after, became the theme song of a television series that was given the same title (Sensiz Olmuyor) and in which Emre played the leading character. The series was aired on Show TV. On 12 June 2007 he released another album, Kişiye Özel. Emre Altuğ was planning to release an English album, for which he traveled to the US and wanted to start working with Mark Feist and Damon Sharpe (who have worked with such artists like Anastacia or Jennifer Lopez and are the producers and co-writers of the charity song Come Together Now), who found Emre's voice outstanding and started to work on four songs with him.

He married the Turkish model Çağla Şıkel in August 2008, with whom he has two sons. The couple divorced in 2015.

== Discography ==
=== Albums ===
Year	Title	Label	English title
1998	İbret-i Alem	Topkapı Müzik/Prestij Müzik	A Lesson To Everyone
2003	Sıcak	DSM/Raks Müzik/Prestij Müzik	Hot
2004	Dudak Dudağa	DSM	Lips To Lips, Sales: 115,000
2005	Sensiz Olmuyor	DMC	Can't Do Without You
2007	Kişiye Özel	DMC	Personal
2011	Zil	DSM	Bell
2017	Yıldırım Gürses Şarkıları	Poll Production	Yıldırım Gürses Songs
2026	Efsane	VTA Entertainment	Myth

=== EPs ===
Year	Title	Label	English title
2010	Emre Altuğ'dan	DSM	From Emre Altuğ
2013	Hangimiz Tertemiz	DSM	Which One of Us is Immaculate?
2016	Çıta	Poll Production	Slat
2022	Aşk İçin (Live)	Emre Altuğ	For Love
2022	Dans İçin (Live)	Emre Altuğ	For Dance
2025	EM'REMIX	VTA Entertainment	EM'REMIX
2025	En Gerçeği (Deluxe) [feat. Mirkelam]	VTA Entertainment	The Truest One

=== Singles ===
Year	Title	Label	English title
2011	Bu Son Olsun (feat. Dervişan)	Dokuz Sekiz Müzik	It'd Better be the Last Time
2012	Resimdeki Gözyaşları	Dokuz Sekiz Müzik	Tears in the Picture
2016	Bu Kadar Mı		[Is it] this much
2018	Zalim Sultan (with Doğukan Manço)	Emre Grafson Müzik	Cruel King
2020	Zahmet Olmazsa (feat. Sıla)	Poll Production	If You Don't Mind
2021	Etme Eyleme	Avrupa Müzik	Don't Take Action
2022	Bal Gibi	Emre Altuğ	Pure and Simple
2022	Avut Beni	Emre Altuğ	Console Me
2023	Sevenler Ayrılmaz	DMC	Lovers Are Inseparable
2023	Yanabilir Her Şey	DMC	Everything Can Burn
2023	Seni Sevmek İçin Ölmek Mi Lazım	DMC	Do I Have to Die to Love You?
2024	Ne Ala	DMC	How Fantastic
2024	Tatildeyim	DMC	I'm on Holiday
2024	Aşk Bence	DMC	Love, in My Opinion
2024	Geçiyor	VTA Entertainment	It's Passing
2024	Fani	VTA Entertainment	Mortal
2025	En Gerçeği (feat. Mirkelam)	VTA Entertainment	The Truest One
2026	Yeni Fark Ettim	VTA Entertainment	I Just Realized
2026	Siyah	VTA Entertainment	Black
2026	Benden Kaçamazsın (with Otilia)	VTA Entertainment	You Can't Escape Me
2026	Не Виноват (with Roza Zərgərli)	VTA Entertainment	Not to Blame

== Filmography ==
=== Television series ===
- 2001: Tatlı Hayat (Sweet Life): Başar Yıldırım
- 2003: Lise Defteri (High School Book): Genc
- 2005: Sensiz olmuyor (Won't work without you): Arda
- 2006: Hasret (Yearning): Poyraz (mini-series)
- 2006: Gülpare: Aslan (mini-series)
- 2008: Mert ile Gert: Mert
- 2010: Elde Var Hayat: Kenan Dağaşan
- 2014: Otel Divane: Fikri Divane
- 2019: Güldür Güldür Show: Kazım
- 2021: Sihirli Annem: Sadık
- 2021: Kırmızı Oda: Dr. Barlas Zalimoğlu
- 2022 : Yalı Çapkını: Orhan Korhan

=== Feature films ===
- 1999: Asansör (Elevator): Metin
- 2000: Ağaçlar Ayakta Ölür (Trees die at their roots): İzzet
- 2000: Halk Çocuğu: Ayhan Alpaylıoğulları
- 2002: Kolay Para: Eray
- 2004: Neredesin Firuze (Where are you, Firuze?): singer
- 2005: Balans ve Manevra (Balance and Manoeuvre): guest appearance
- 2006: Asterix Vikinglere Karşı
- 2006: Eve Giden Yol: 1914: Halit
- 2007: Bratz
- 2010: Sizi Seviyorum: Erkut
- 2018: Sevgili Komşum: Ragip
- 2019: Geniş Aile Komşu Kızı

== Sources ==
- Biyografi.org (in Turkish)
