= Şimdi =

Studio album by Gülşen
- Released: 2001
- Genre: Pop
- Length: 42:23
- Language: Turkish
- Label: Prestij
- Producer: Hilmi Topaloğlu; İbrahim Genç; Burhan Aydemir; Selim Çaldıran (musical direction)

Gülşen chronology
Erkeksen (1998)	Şimdi (2001)	Of... Of... (2004)

Şimdi (Now) is the third studio album by Turkish singer Gülşen. It released by Prestij Müzik in November 2001 and featured the leading single "İhanet" (Betrayal), written by Gülşen, which was about Murat Varol and Gülşen's extramarital affairs during their marriage. The album's production company was affected during the 2001 Turkish economic crisis, and as a result, they produced one music video only for the song "İhanet".

== Track listing ==
No.	Title	Writer(s)	Composer(s)	Length
1.	"İhanet"	Gülşen	Gülşen	4:05
2.	"Bu Aşk Adam Olmaz"	Alper Narman	Alper Narman	3:53
3.	"Dünya Yıkılsa"	Günay Çoban	Sezen Aksu	5:43
4.	"Kahpe"	Sezen Aksu	Sezen Aksu	4:22
5.	"Can Gidiyor"	Gülşen	Gülşen	3:33
6.	"Kimselere Güvenmiyorum"	Gülşen	Gülşen	4:20
7.	"Tutuldu"	Gülşen	Gülşen	4:57
8.	"Sebebsiz Değil"	Gülşen & Alper Narman	Alper Narman	3:42
9.	"Kurşun"	Sude Bilge Demir	Sude Bilge Demir	4:11
10.	"Gitmesi Kolay"	Gülşen	Gülşen	3:37
Total length:				42:23

== Release history ==
Country	Date	Format	Label	Ref.
Turkey	November 2001	CD	Prestij Müzik	
Turkey	31 December 2005	Digital download	Prestij Müzik	
Worldwide	31 December 2005	Digital download	Prestij Müzik	
