= Ama Bir Farkla =

Studio album by Gülşen
- Released: 13 July 2007
- Genre: Pop
- Length: 52:39
- Label: Rec by Saatci

Gülşen chronology
Mucize (2007)	Ama Bir Farkla (2007)	Önsöz (2009)

Ama Bir Farkla (But with a Difference) is the sixth studio album by Turkish singer Gülşen. It was released on 13 July 2007 by Rec by Saatci. It was her first and only album to be released by this company.

== Content ==
Ufuk Yıldırım served as the album's arranger, while Gülşen and Ercan Saatçi wrote and composed the songs. For its first music video, Gülşen chose "Kara Böcükler", a song which features ironic elements. Two other music videos were made for the songs "E Bilemem Artık" and "Su Gibi Geçerdi Zaman", the first of which ranked second on Turkey's official music chart.

== Criticism ==
The album's graphic design was criticized due to its similarities to Jessica Stam's photos taken by Mert Alaş and Marcus Piggott for a fashion shoot titled "Travel". Director Deniz Akel also claimed that the concept for Gülşen's music video "Karaböcükler" was nearly identical to the one she had shot for Atiye's music video "Beyaz Eşya". In "Karaböcükler", Gülşen throws pirate printed CD covers and her mobile phone, which is full of messages sent by hypocrites, in a washing machine and ends up with the album cover for Ama Bir Farkla, while in Atiye's music video she throws a man inside a washing machine, both symbolizing the act of washing unwanted things away. In response to the criticism, Gülşen stated that the album's main design was the idea of the photographer who, under the inspiration of Mert Alaş's work, had thought that the concept would only suit Gülşen out of the Turkish artists, though she added that she would not have allowed this to happen had she known of the similarities in the first place. In regards to the music video, she mentioned that the whole concept was Süleyman Yüksel's idea, to emphasize on getting rid of things that make life difficult for the people such as fake news and messages.

For her second music video, "E Bilemem Artık", a studio at Om Plato in Mecidiyeköy was turned into a botanical forest. In the video, which was shot by Tamer Aydoğdu, a variety of different animals from Şile Zoo, including iguanas, snakes, parrots, peacocks, pigeons, and birds, were used. Gülşen's appearance alongside these animals while wearing furs was criticized by a number of critics. In response to the criticism, Gülşen joked that she keeps "her beloved close to [herself]". This brought about further criticism, especially from the singer Yeliz who suggested that Gülşen should "then skin her boyfriend, mother and father and keep them in her bag. One should not joke just to have her name mentioned frequently".

== Track listing ==
No.	Title	Writer(s)	Composer(s)	Length
1.	"E Bilemem Artık"	Ercan Saatçi & Gülşen	Ercan Saatçi & Ufuk Yıldırım	4:32
2.	"Kara Böcükler"	Ercan Saatçi	Ufuk Yıldırım	4:00
3.	"Muhtelif Zamanlarda"	Gülşen	Gülşen	3:47
4.	"Sayenizde 2"	Ercan Saatçi	Aykut Gürel	3:47
5.	"İhtilaller"	Gülşen	Ercan Saatçi	4:32
6.	"Su Gibi Geçerdi Zaman"	Gülşen	Gülşen	3:41
7.	"Ama Bir Farkla"	Gülşen	Gülşen	3:42
8.	"Uzlaşırız Zannederken"	Ercan Saatçi & Gülşen	Ufuk Yıldırım	3:40
9.	"Geç Kalmışız"	Gülşen	Gülşen & Ercan Saatçi	4:22
10.	"Ruhumu Asla"	Sezen Aksu	Sezen Aksu	4:29
11.	"Detay"	Gülşen	Gülşen & Fahrettin Aykut	3:24
12.	"Sayenizde"	Ercan Saatçi	Aykut Gürel	2:19
13.	"O Zaman"	Ercan Saatçi	Ufuk Yıldırım	4:00
Total length:				52:39
