= Erkeksen =

Studio album by Gülşen
- Released: 1998
- Studio: Atlantis
- Genre: Pop
- Length: 59:47
- Language: Turkish
- Label: Prestij; Türküola
- Producer: Hilmi Topaloğlu; Burhan Aydemir; Mahsun Kırmızıgül

Gülşen chronology
| Be Adam (1996) | Erkeksen (1998) | Şimdi (2001) |

Erkeksen (If You're A Man) is the second studio album by Turkish singer Gülşen. It was released in 1998 by Prestij Müzik and Türküola Müzik. Gülşen wrote the lyrics for the singles "Yiğidim", "Delisin" and "Gözü Karalım", and subsequently separate music videos were released for each of them. Following the album's release, Gülşen received a nomination at the 5th Kral TV Video Music Awards as the "Best Pop Female Artist".

== Track listing ==
| No. | Title | Writer(s) | Composer(s) | Length |
|---|---|---|---|---|
| 1. | "Eyvallah" | Zeynep Talu Kurşuncu | Garo Mafyan | 3:44 |
| 2. | "Yiğidim" | Hakkı Yalçın & Mahsun Kırmızıgül | Mahsun Kırmızıgül | 4:09 |
| 3. | "Ben Böyleyim" | Serdar Ortaç | Serdar Ortaç | 4:09 |
| 4. | "Gözü Karalım" | Gülşen | Gülşen | 5:25 |
| 5. | "İhanet Ettin" | Serdar Ortaç | Serdar Ortaç | 3:56 |
| 6. | "Yokluğunda" | Gülşen | Gülşen | 4:46 |
| 7. | "Erkeksen" | Gülşen | Gülşen | 4:39 |
| 8. | "Boşsun Adam" | Zeynep Talu Kurşuncu | Selim Çaldiran | 3:37 |
| 9. | "Sen" | Gülşen | Gülşen | 5:06 |
| 10. | "Belalım Oldun" | Hakkı Yalçın | Mahsun Kırmızıgül | 3:31 |
| 11. | "Bitti" | Gülşen | Gülşen | 3:25 |
| 12. | "Dudaklarında" | Gülşen | Gülşen | 3:56 |
| 13. | "Anam" | Gülşen | Gülşen | 5:38 |
| 14. | "Delisin" | Okan Yurdatapan | Okan Yurdatapan | 3:38 |
| Total length: | | | | 59:47 |
