= Be Adam =

Studio album by Gülşen
- Released: 1 July 1996
- Genre: Pop
- Length: 47:23
- Label: Raks

Gülşen chronology
Be Adam (1996)	Erkeksen (1998)

Be Adam (Oh Man) is the first studio album by Turkish singer Gülşen. It was released by Raks Müzik on 1 July 1996. Following the release of the album, Milliyet wrote that Gülşen had made an ambitious start in her career. The album earned Gülşen a nomination in the Best Newcomer Female Artist category at the 3rd Kral TV Video Music Awards. The songs "Gel Çarem", "Be Adam", "Saz mı Caz mı?" and "Son Sözüm" were pieces from the album for which separate music videos were released.

== Track listing ==
No.	Title	Writer(s)	Composer(s)	Length
1.	"Be Adam"	Özkan Turgay	Özkan Turgay	3:28
2.	"Son Sözüm"	Özkan Turgay	Özkan Turgay	4:17
3.	"Saz mı Caz mı?"	Serap Turgay	Özkan Turgay	3:46
4.	"Sarı Gül"	Özkan Turgay	Özkan Turgay	4:23
5.	"Zig Zag"	Ülkü Aker	Özkan Turgay	3:39
6.	"Yaz Gülüm"	Gülşen	Gülşen	4:07
7.	"Gel Çarem"	Özkan Turgay	Özkan Turgay	4:11
8.	"Tuti Dillim"	Özkan Turgay	Özkan Turgay	3:16
9.	"Nasıl Unut Dersin"	Sevtap Canbey	Özkan Turgay	2:54
10.	"Fırsatçı"	Serap Turgay	Özkan Turgay	3:23
11.	"Aman"	Serap Turgay	Özkan Turgay	2:57
12.	"Buzdağım"	Özkan Turgay	Özkan Turgay	4:17
13.	"Gel Yapma Gel"	Tulga Aktuğ	Tulga Aktuğ	2:45
Total length:				47:23
