= Çağlayan (surname) =

Çağlayan is a Turkish surname. In Turkish, çağlayan means a "cataract" in terms of the types of waterfalls.

Notable people with the surname include:

== People ==
- Armağan Çağlayan (born 1966), Turkish television producer
- Burhan Suat Çağlayan, Turkish politician and former Minister of Culture
- Hüseyin Çağlayan (born 1970), British Turkish Cypriot fashion designer
- Mesude Çağlayan (1918–2011), Turkish opera singer
- Zafer Çağlayan (born 1957), Turkish politician and former Minister of Economic Affairs
- Sevim Çağlayan, Turkish actress and Ottoman classical music singer
