= Number 1 TV =

Number 1 TV (NR1)
- Broadcast area: National

Programming
- Language(s): Turkish
- Picture format: 16:9 HDTV

Ownership
- Sister channels: NR1 Türk TV; Number 1 FM; Number 1 Türk FM; Fashion One TV Turkey

History
- Launched: August 1994

Links
- Website: www.numberone.com.tr

Availability

Streaming media
- numberone.com.tr: Watch (Free)

Number 1 TV is a Turkish music television channel. It was launched in 1994. Being one of the earliest foreign music channels to be introduced in Turkey, its initial broadcast took place from the existing studio located in Yenibosna and embarked on its journey with a modest studio setup and a limited workforce.

In order to ensure visual consistency on screen, the channel pioneered the concept of clip generations. These clip generations featured song titles, artists, and record companies for both domestic and international music videos. Number One TV became the first channel worldwide to broadcast clips for songs such as Madonna's "The Power Of Goodbye" and The Cranberries' "Promises."

== Shows ==
- Hit
- Start
- 35mm
- On Air
- Mixer
- Instant Request
- Performance
- Nası'Yapalım
- Backstage
- KaraokeVan
- Triple Play
