= Peace at home, peace in the world =

Phrase used by Mustafa Kemal Atatürk to set Turkish foreign policy

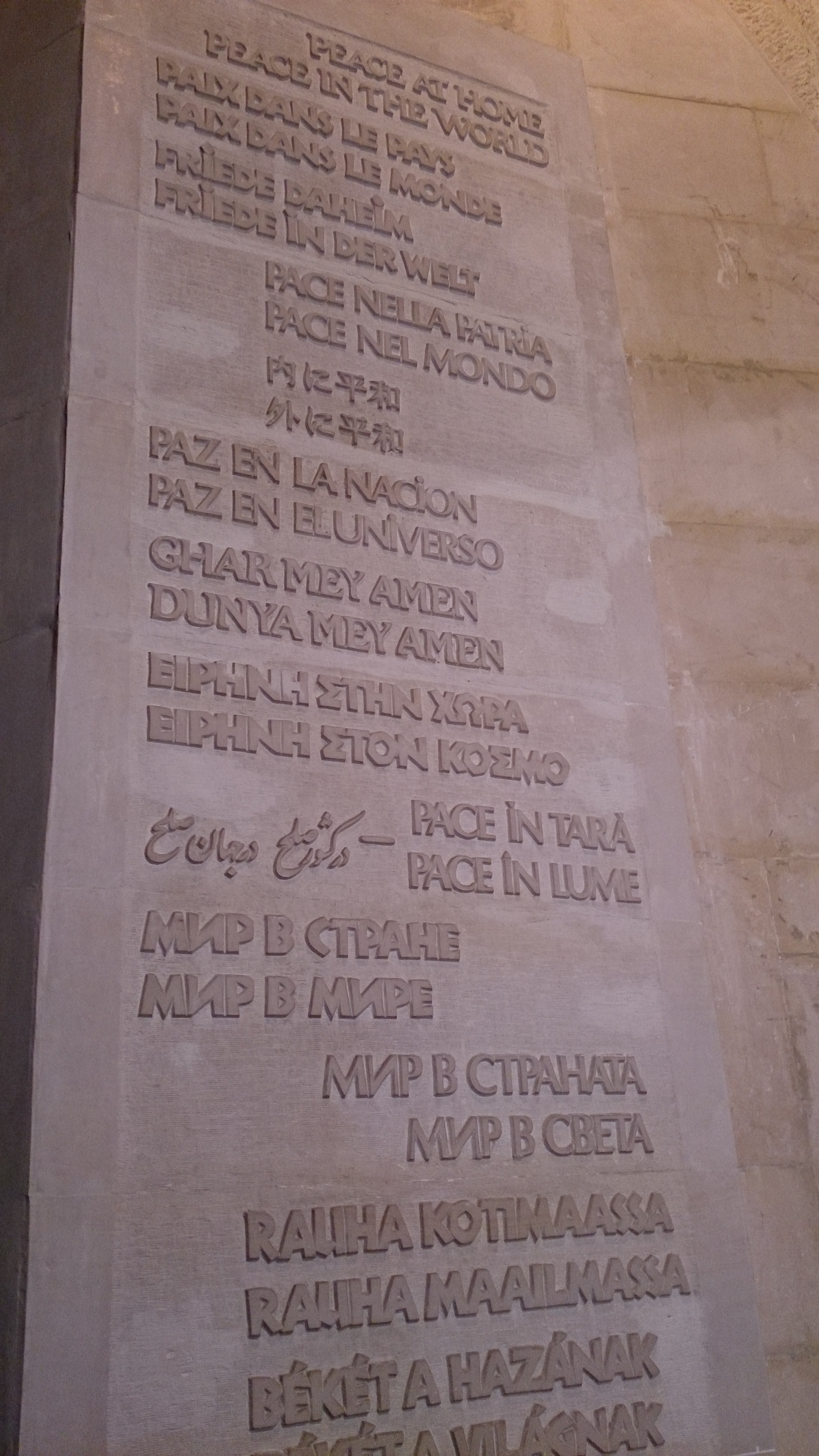
The quote in various languages in Istanbul Military Museum, The Hall of Martyrs

The slogan "Peace at home, peace in the world" (Turkish: Yurtta sulh, cihanda sulh, IPA: [juɾtˈta suɫ(h) | dʒihanˈda suɫ(h)]) (Note: Rendered today as Yurtta barış, dünyada barış (IPA: [juɾtˈta baˈɾɯʃ | dynjaˈda baˈɾɯʃ]) due to Atatürk's language reforms) was first pronounced by Mustafa Kemal Atatürk on 20 April 1931 to the public during his tours of Anatolia. This stance was later integrated and implemented as the foreign policy of the Republic of Turkey.

The original full sentence was "Cumhuriyet Halk Fırkası'nın müstakar umumî siyasetini şu kısa cümle açıkça ifadeye kâfidir zannederim: Yurtta sulh, cihanda sulh için çalışıyoruz." This is translated into English as "To describe the stable and general diplomatic policy of the Republican People's Party, I think this short sentence is enough: We work for peace at home, peace in the world."

== 2023 Super Cup Dispute ==
The slogan was at the heart of a dispute causing the Turkish Super Cup final between Galatasaray and Fenerbahçe in Saudi Arabia in December 2023 to be postponed. As the cup was being held on the centennial of the Turkish Republic, the match was thought to be of special national importance. Fenerbahçe wanted to make statements with the banners "Peace at home, peace in the world" but the Saudi authorities would not allow this, saying it had not been previously discussed. The players were also not allowed onto the pitch wearing T-shirts bearing Atatürk's image. Additionally, Saudi authorities didn't initially allow for the Turkish national anthem to be played.

Saudi authorities contest that it was agreed that no political slogans should be raised, and entry to the stadium should be in the official jerseys approved by the Turkish Football Federation. However, the words and images of Atatürk as well as the National Anthem were never considered political by either club, and since they had never asked TFF for permission for such things, this caused a major misunderstanding. For hours after the dispute became public, there was an unofficial diplomatic crisis. After it became clear that the situation could not be solved in a way that would honor the special importance of the match, the match was cancelled, hours before kick-off.
