= Çağla Şıkel =

Turkish model, actress and TV presenter (born 1979)

- Born: 2 January 1979 (age 47); Istanbul, Turkey
- Education: Mimar Sinan Fine Arts University
- Occupations: TV presenter, actress, dancer, model, blogger
- Years active: 1996–present
- Height: 1.85 m (6 ft 1 in)
- Spouse: Emre Altuğ (m. 2008; div. 2015)
- Children: 2
- Website: caglasikel.com.tr

Çağla Şıkel (born 2 January 1979) is a Turkish ballet dancer, model, actress and TV presenter.

== Early life and education ==
Çağla Şıkel was born on 2 January 1979 in Istanbul as the second child of Asuman and Hüseyin Şıkel. Her father was a financial advisor of Azerbaijani descent, while her mother was a housewife of Circassian descent. She has an elder sister named Berna.

She studied at Mimar Sinan University State Conservatory in 1997 and graduated in 1999.

== Career ==
Şıkel won Miss Turkey beauty competition in 1997. She was fourth in Miss World and was chosen as The Queen of Europe. She is the face of many famous brands.

She also took ballet lessons at a young age. She worked in Istanbul State Operatte and Cemal Reşit Rey Orchestra Ballet. On 11 August 2013, she returned to the stage after 16 years, and performed the "Bach Alla Turca" ballet with Samsun State Opera and ballet dancers at the 11th International Bodrum Ballet Festival.

Şıkel is best known for her role as Sultan in the spin off series Cennet Mahallesi and has appeared in many gypsy comedy films, such as Gırgıriye. She played as Melek in the hit comedy series Avrupa Yakası, played a leading role in the series Zehirli Çiçek, and was cast in the international festival film "Odessa".

She presented many TV programmings over the years of her career. Şıkel is also a blogger and regularly publishes videos on her YouTube channel.

== Personal life ==
In 2002, Şıkel was in a relationship with fellow model Bozok Gören. She was later linked to Beyazıt Öztürk.

Şıkel later dated pop singer Emre Altuğ before marrying him on 10 August 2008. Şıkel announced her first pregnancy on 18 December 2008, but around a week later, she had a miscarriage due to a period of illness. On 31 October 2010, she gave birth to her first son Kuzey. Şıkel had another son named Uzay, born in 2012, and she and Altuğ divorced on 12 January 2015.

== Filmography ==
As actress

- Görgüsüzler (Sultan) (2008)
- Cennet Mahallesi (Sultan Erdağı) (2004–2007)
- Avrupa Yakası (Melek)
- Zehirli Çiçek
- Dostlar Mahallesi (2017)
- Jet Sosyete (Herself) (2017; episode 3)

As presenter

- Aile Boyu
- Şehirler Yarışıyor
- İlle de Roman Olsun
- Her şey Dahil (2013–?)
- Tabu (contest)
- Her Şey Dahil
- Bugün Ne Giysem
- Kız Tarafı Erkek Tarafı (2015)
- Ben Söylerim (2017)
- Çağla ile Yeni Bir Gün (2018–)

Music videos

- "O'nun Vedası" – Singer: Yaşar (1996)
- "Çiçeklendim" – Singer: Emel Müftüoğlu (1998)
- "Benimle Evlenir misin?" – Singer: Çelik (1998)
- "Ölümsüz Aşklar" – Singer: Alişan (2016)

Commercials

- Clear (2009)
- ABC (2010)
- Hepsiburada.com (2014)
- Vernel (2014)
- Enpara.com (2017)

Awards and achievements
Preceded by Pınar Tezcan	Miss Turkey	Succeeded by Buket Saygı
