= Cemil Topuzlu Open-Air Theatre =

Amphitheatre in Istanbul, Turkey

- Cemil Topuzlu Açıkhava Tiyatrosu
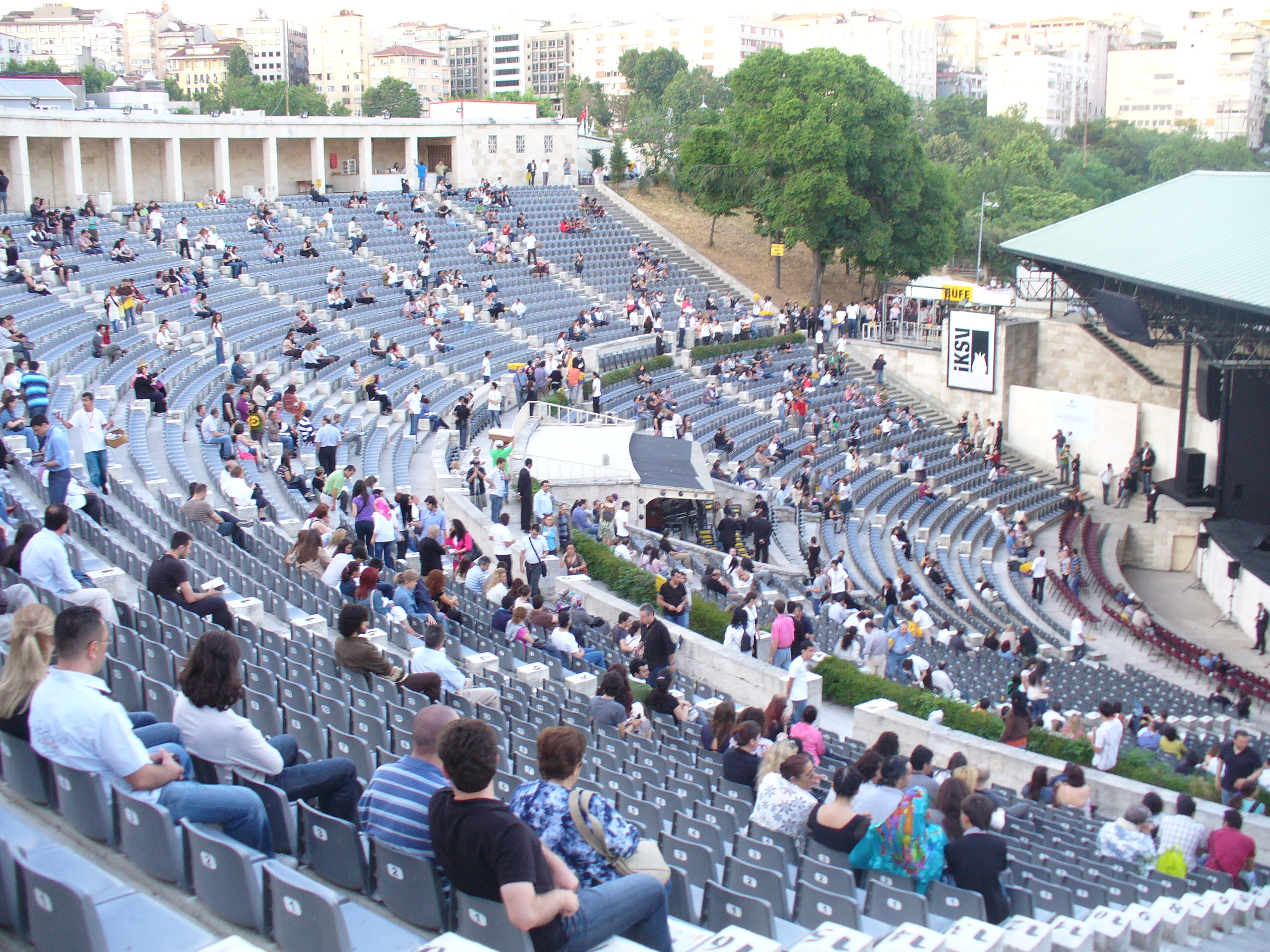
- The Cemil Topuzlu Open-Air Theatre before the Loreena McKennitt concert on 13 June 2009.

- Location within Istanbul

General information
- Location: Harbiye, Şişli, Taşkışla Cad., Istanbul, Turkey
- Coordinates: 41°02′45″N 28°59′25″E
- Groundbreaking: July 1946
- Opened: August 9, 1947; 78 years ago
- Cost: ₺900,000 (1950s)
- Client: Kültür A.Ş.
- Owner: Istanbul Metropolitan Municipality

Design and construction
- Architects: Nihad Yücel and Nahid Uysal

Other information
- Seating capacity: 3,972 + 30 VIP

The Cemil Topuzlu Open-Air Theatre (Turkish: Cemil Topuzlu Açıkhava Tiyatrosu, also called simply Açıkhava Tiyatrosu) is an open-air theatre located at Harbiye neighborhood of Şişli district in Istanbul, Turkey. It is situated across from the Istanbul Lütfi Kırdar Convention and Exhibition Center, and behind the Hilton Istanbul Bosphorus on the European side of the city.

As the city's most popular summertime outdoor venue, the theatre primarily hosts music concerts in various genres of local and international performers. It also hosts cultural activities for several festivals held in Istanbul in the summer.

== History ==
The construction of the open-air theatre was proposed by French urban planner Henri Prost (1874–1959), who developed a project for Istanbul in the 1930s. Designed by Turkish architects Nihad Yücel and Nahid Uysal, the groundbreaking took place in July 1946, in the office time of Lütfi Kırdar (1887–1961), governor and mayor of Istanbul.

The theatre was opened on August 9, 1947 with a ceremony. However, it took its final form after German stage director Carl Ebert (1887–1980), then head of Ankara State Conservatory, made modifications in the architectural design of the stage area. Remedy of all the deficiencies completed in the 1950s only. The construction cost ₺900,000 at the end.

The theatre was inaugurated with a play of Sophocles, the Athenian tragedy Oedipus the King, performed by actors of the Ankara State Theatre.

In 1958, the venue was named after Cemil Topuzlu (1866–1958), mayor of Istanbul in the era of Ottoman Second Constitutional Monarchy.

== Architecture ==
The facade is faced with limestone and Uzunköprü stone interchangeably to achieve a tone of color. The tier seating is of Uzunköprü stone also. The outdoor theatre is designed in the form of ancient theatres with tiered seating for spectators, semicircular in shape, around a flat performance space. The theatre's seating capacity is 3,972, and there are additional 30 "loge" seats for VIP. The section for the orchestra can hold 80 musicians. A movie projector is situated in the middle of the auditorium for movie or slide show purposes. The stage is large enough to enable 200-300 background actors freely move. The passages and the gates are dimensioned for instantaneous evacuation of the stage.

== See also ==
- Cemal Reşit Rey Concert Hall
