= Nazan Öncel =

Turkish singer-songwriter (born 1956)

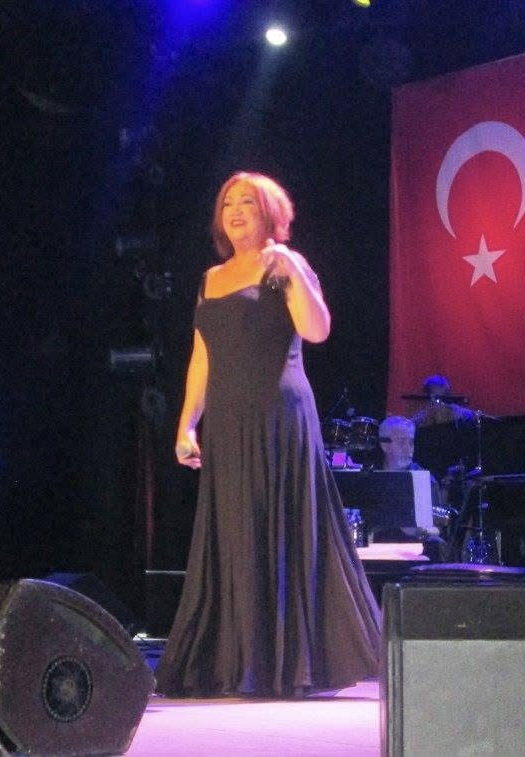
- Nazan Oncel's performance at Bostancı Performance Center, 2015

Background information
- Born: 6 February 1956 (age 70)
- Origin: İzmir, Turkey
- Genres: Pop; pop rock
- Occupations: Singer; songwriter
- Years active: 1975–present
- Labels: Melodi; Tempo; Yaşar Kekeva; Raks; Mert; Hitt; Seyhan; Avrupa; DMC
- Website: nazanoncel.net

Nazan Öncel (Turkish pronunciation: [naːˈzan œnˈdʒæl]; born 6 February 1956) is a Turkish singer-songwriter. She also does the arrangements for most of them and has written songs for such singers as Tarkan and İbrahim Tatlıses.

== Biography and career ==
In 1978, her song "Sana Kul Köle Olmuştum" ("I Had Become Your Slave"), written by Erdener Koyutürk and Özdener Koyutürk, was aired on radio and television, and Nazan's interesting voice attracted attention. Her first album (LP), Yağmur Duası (Prayer for Rain) was published in 1982. The first album, where all of the songs were written by Öncel herself, was published in 1992, by the title "Bir Hadise Var" ("There is an Issue"). In 1994, she published her second album Ben Böyle Aşk Görmedim (I Didn't See Love like This) and album included a 1994 hit with its video, "Geceler Kara Tren" ("The Nights are Dark Train").

Her 1996 album "Sokak Kızı" ("Stray Girl") included a more rock-oriented sound than its predecessor. The album included four singles and three of this singles; "Erkekler de Yanar" ("The Men Are on the Hook, too"), "A Bu Hayat" ("This Life") and "Bırak Seveyim Rahat Edeyim" (Let Me Love You and Have Peace) became hits with their videos.

Nazan Öncel has finished working on her 7th studio album. It features 12 new songs and is titled 7'n Bitirdin. The mastering process of the album has been seen through by Miles Showell in London, who is known for his works with artists such as Queen, Elton John and George Michael.

== Discography ==
=== Studio albums ===
Release date	Album	Format	Sales and certifications
1982	Yağmur Duası (Prayer For Rain)	LP	+10,000
11 October 1991	Bir Hadise Var (There's Something Going On)	MC, CD	+1,500,000
24 January 1994	Ben Böyle Aşk Görmedim (I Haven't Seen a Love Quite Like This)	MC, CD	+600,000
July 1995	Göç (Exodus)	MC, CD	+200,000
20 June 1996	Sokak Kızı (Street Girl)	MC, CD	+450,000
10 March 1999	Demir Leblebi (Steel Nut)	MC, CD	+200,000
24 September 2003	Yan Yana Fotoğraf Çektirelim (Let's Have Our Picture Taken Side by Side)	MC, CD	+288,000
30 June 2006	7'n Bitirdin (You Ate Me Up)	MC, CD	+210,000
22 December 2008	Hatırına Sustum (I Kept Silent For Your Sake)	CD	+70,000
27 May 2011	Hayvan (tier)	CD	+40.000
25 March 2014	Bazı Şeyler	CD	
2 September 2016	Sakin Ol Şampiyon	CD	
23 March 2018	Durum Şarkıları	CD	
17 August 2018	Ve Nazan Öncel Şarkıları	CD	
24 November 2023	Kara Plak Geceye Bir Şarkı	Digital, LP	

=== Remix albums ===
Release date	Album	Format	Sales and certifications
31 July 2012	Hayvan'a Remix	2 CD	

=== Singles ===
Released	Title	Format	Note
1978	Sana Kul Köle Olmuştum / Kader Bu, Çekeceksin		
November 2009	Ceylan		Written in memory of Ceylan Önkol
15 April 2010	Tuttum, Bırakmam	CD	
23 June 2015	Aşkitom		
2 September 2016	Sakin Ol Şampiyon		
7 February 2020	Bir Bilsem Ah, Bir Bilebilsem		
12 April 2023	Deniz Tutmaz (with Sade İnsanlar)		
23 June 2023	Saykodelik (with Cem Adrian)		

=== Compilation albums ===
Release date	Album	Format
1 February 2006	Bir Şarkı Tut (Pick a Song)	MC, CD

=== Charts ===
Album	Single	Peak position	
Album	Single	Turkey	Russia
Ben Böyle Aşk Görmedim	Ben Böyle Aşk Görmedim	-	-
Ben Böyle Aşk Görmedim	Geceler Kara Tren	-	-
Göç	Gidelim Buralardan	-	-
Sokak Kızı	Erkekler de Yanar	-	-
Sokak Kızı	A Bu Hayat	-	-
Sokak Kızı	Bırak Seveyim Rahat Edeyim	-	-
Yan Yana Fotoğraf Çektirelim	Hay Hay	-	198
Yan Yana Fotoğraf Çektirelim	Hokka	-	283
Yan Yana Fotoğraf Çektirelim	Nereye Böyle	-	-
Yan Yana Fotoğraf Çektirelim	Hayat Güzelmiş	-	-
Yan Yana Fotoğraf Çektirelim	Atıyorsun	-	346
7'n Bitirdin	Aşkım Baksana Bana	1	-
7'n Bitirdin	Omzumda Ağla	3	-
7'n Bitirdin	Ekilmekteyim	10	-
7'n Bitirdin	7'n Bitirdin	-	-
Hatırına Sustum	Seni Bugün Görmem Lazım	38	-

== See also ==
- Nazan Saatci
