= Ferman Akgül =

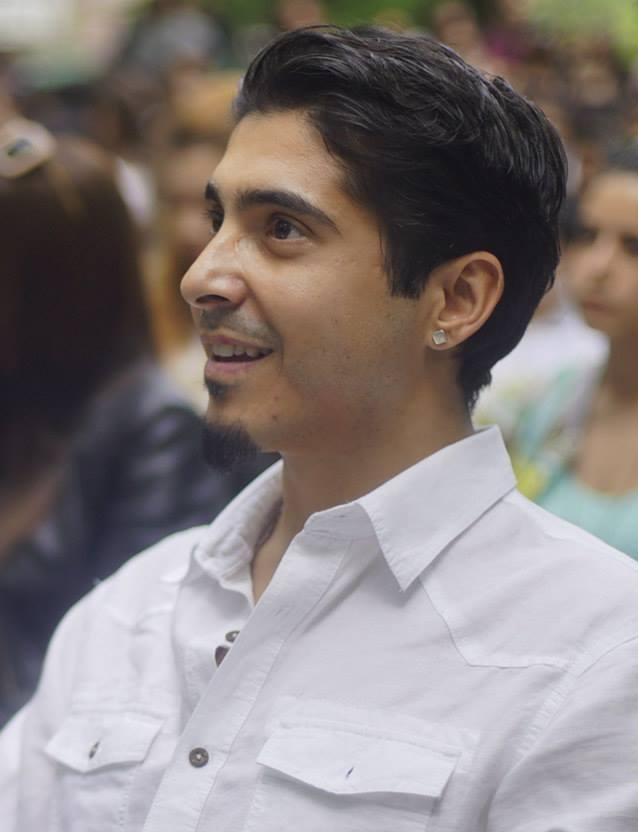
- Akgül at the 12th Radio Boğaziçi Music Awards, May 2015
- Born: Ferman Akgül; 25 December 1979 (age 45)
- Education: Gazi University
- Occupations: Singer; songwriter
- Spouse: Bettina Kuperman (m. 2021)
- Children: 2
- Musical career
- Genres: Alternative rock; nu metal; pop rock
- Instruments: Vocals; keyboards
- Years active: 2001–present
- Labels: Sony; GRGDN; Pasaj; Poll; 06
- Member of: maNga
- Website: fermanakgul.com

İbrahim Ferman Akgül (born 25 December 1979) is a Turkish singer, songwriter, TV host and actor. He is the lead singer of Turkish rock band maNga. In 2015 he opened the independent record label 06 Records and released his first solo single "İstemem Söz Sevmeni" in early 2016.

== Early years ==
Born on the 25 December 1979 in Ankara. His grandfather, Aziz Üstün is an ozan who worked together with Aşık Veysel. Akgül's interest for making music started in high school. He quickly discovered he had a talent for composing. In 1998, he started studying architecture at Gazi University. He was drawn towards the Ankara underground music scene and started connecting with different rock bands. He had a vision to create a new type of rock band and set out to find his band members. He was inspired by the 90's nu metal bands and wanted to play the turn table. However a twist of faith made him temporary fill the role as the lead singer and Akgül decided singing was the best way to express himself. In 2001, he ended his search for a band when he became a member of maNga.

"I studied architecture, and the discipline of “looking for beauty” which my professors taught me, has inevitably affected my music." said Akgül. Upon graduation Ferman started working as an architect. He got an honorable mention award for a project he worked on together with the respected Turkish architect Yavuz Selim Sepin, while he was recording maNga's first album.

In 2009 Akgül completed his master in cinematography from Marmara University. He later used his skills to direct several of music videos for maNga and other bands.

== Career ==
=== Inside Turkey ===
Prior to the release of their first album the band moved to Istanbul in a bid to start their professional music career. The first album, released as maNga in December 2004 is one of the most successful and most sold album in Turkish rock history. The band received a Golden Record and a host of other awards following the release. Between the years of 2005-2009 the band toured Turkey and Europe extensively. In 2006, their song "Bir Kadın Çizeceksin" was used as the FIFA06 soundtrack.

The second album Şehr-i Hüzün followed in 2009 and became an even bigger success.

In 2012 the E-akustik album was released to rave reviews. The eclectic acoustic project broadened maNga's fan base and established their name as a strong force in the European music community. Radio and television stations rallied to have the band perform live acoustic sets.

In 2014 maNga released their fourth album Işıkları Söndürseler Bile and once again topped the charts.

In 2015 maNga made the soundtrack for and appeared in the movie Hadi İnşallah. The song became a major hit.

=== International experience ===
In 2009 Akgül and the other members of maNga had their sights set on international success. In 2009, they received the Best European Act award at the MTV Europe Music Awards and the same year, they released the Şehr-i Hüzün album.

Their big international break came in 2010, when they came second in the Eurovision Song Contest with the song "We Could Be the Same". The exposure made them known around Europe and in 2011, "Fly to Stay Alive" written and composed by Akgül, was released. The single topped the charts in several European countries including #1 on the MTV Adria Rock Chart. The single has since been used as commercial music for TV, featuring athletes from teams such as LA Lakers and Manchester United.

maNga has performed as opening act for Korn, Linkin Park, Nine Inch Nails, The Cure, The Offspring, Limp Bizkit, and Skin. They have headlined countless festivals and shows (Rock'n Coke, Fanta, Vitebsk Slavianski Bazaar Belarus, Sziget Hungary, The Balkan Concerts Bosnia & Herzegovina, Balkan Music Awards Bulgaria, Belgrade Festival Serbia) and toured extensively through Europe. Across the pond they performed at New York City’s “Istanbul Live” Central Park and London's O2 Academy Islington.

== Solo projects ==
Akgül has engaged in several successful collaborations with other Turkish artists such as Göksel and Ozan Çolakoğlu. He has released two electronic music singles with Turkish DJ Birol "Beegee" Giray and subsequently toured Turkey's club scene.

Akgül directed the music videos of noteworthy Turkish musicians such as Sagopa Kajmer, and Cartel. maNga's music video of their song "Yalan", directed by Akgül in 2007 received the Best Music Video Award by Radio Boğaziçi.

Akgül has directed and hosted three seasons of the music program Kulaktan Kulağa on Turkish state TV, TRT Müzik. The program is shot on location in different cities in Turkey and in the studio. The concept of the program is to explore the local music culture and pair local musicians with contemporary Turkish stars. A fourth season will be produced.

In 2008, Akgül created a music column for Billboard Türkiye and continued to write for the magazine for 2 years. After the magazine stopped being published in Turkey, he continued as a columnist for 46 Magazine. Akgül is a regular arts and music columnist for Turkish newspaper Vatan.

Akgül is an eager short story writer and is working on publishing a collection of short stories.

In the beginning of 2016 Akgül released his first solo single "İstemem Söz Sevmeni" under his own label 06 Records in cooperation with EMI - Universal Music Turkey.

Akgül starred in the Turkish production of The Little Prince at the Zorlu Performance Centre. He played one of the lead roles, the Pilot.

== Discography ==
=== Studio albums (with maNga) ===
- 2004: maNga
- 2006: maNga+
- 2009: Şehr-i Hüzün
- 2010: We Could Be the Same (EP)
- 2012: e-akustik
- 2014: Işıkları Söndürseler Bile

=== Studio albums (solo) ===
- 2017: Yürüyorum İçimde

=== Singles ===
- 2016: İstemem Söz Sevmeni
- 2016: Dırdır (feat. Pascal Nouma)
- 2018: Efsaneyiz (feat. Fatma Turgut)
- 2020: 100 kere 23 Nisan (with İskender Paydaş and Nilüfer Children's Choir)

== Awards ==
Akgül and maNga have won over 200 world recognized awards in over 25 countries.

- 2002 - “Sing Your Song”: Runner-Up Prize (Kal Yanımda)
- 2005 - Golden Butterfly Awards: The Best New Band (Bir Kadın Çizeceksin)
- 2006 – “Bir Kadın Çizeceksin” was included in the soundtrack of FIFA
- 2006 - MÜ-YAP Music Industry Awards: Golden Record Award
- 2006 - Our Future Magazine: Best Band
- 2006 - Jetix TV Awards: Best Band
- 2006 - Beyaz Show Oscars: Best Performance
- 2006 - Kemal Sunal Culture and Art Awards: Best New Band (Bir Kadın Çizeceksin)
- 2006 - Popsay Awards: Best Rock and Alternative Band
- 2006 - Popsay Awards: Best Music Video (Bir Kadın Çizeceksin)
- 2007 - Radio Boğaziçi: Best Animation Music Video (Yalan)
- 2007 - Kanaltürk Award Ceremony: Best Band
- 2007 - Kanaltürk Award Ceremony: Best Music Video (Bir Kadın Çizeceksin)
- 2007 - Yıldız Technical University: Best Band Award
- 2009 - Yıldız Technical University: Best Band Award
- 2009 – Best Band in Balkan Music Awards
- 2009 - MTV Europe The Best Band of The Year
- 2009 - 13. İstanbul FM Golden Awards: Best Band
- 2009 - Pal FM Best Awards: Best live Performance
- 2009 - Pal FM Best Awards: Best Song (Dünyanın Sonuna Doğmuşum)
- 2009 - 17. İTÜ EMOS Success Awards: Most Successful Band of the Year
- 2010 - 16. Kral Music Awards: Best Band
- 2010 - 55. Eurovision Song Contest: Runner-up Prize (We Could Be The Same)
- 2011 - Balkan Music Awards: Best Band of Balkans
- 2012 - Balkan Music Awards: Best Band of Balkans
- 2012 - Radio Klas Music Awards: Best Band
- 2012 - Blue Jean Awards: Band of the Year
- 2012 - Blue Jean Awards: Album of the Year (E-Akustik)
- 2012 - Golden Spider Media Awards: Best Website (www.manga.web.tr)
- 2015 – Turkey Youth Awards: Best Band
- 2015 - Magazinci.com 15th Year Internet Media Bests of the Year: Best Band of the Year
- 2015 - Radio Boğaziçi: Best Band
- 2015 - Radio Ege: Best Band
- 2015 - Gazi University: Best Band
- 2015 - Istanbul Technical University: Best Band

== Co-written songs ==
- Rezalet Çıkarasım Var
  - Music: Yağmur Sarıgül
  - Lyrics: with Yağmur Sarıgül
- Hayat Bu İşte
  - Music: with Yağmur Sarıgül, Haluk Kurosman
  - Lyrics: Yağmur Sarıgül, Haluk Kurosman
- Hani Biz (Feat. Yıldız Tilbe)
  - Music: with Yağmur Sarıgül
- Beni Benimle Bırak
  - Music: with Yağmur Sarıgül
  - Lyrics: with Haluk Kurosman, Cem Bahtiyar
- We Could Be The Same
  - Music: with maNga
  - Lyrics: with Evren Özdemir, maNga, Fiona Movery Akıncı
- Bir Kadın Çizeceksin
- Ben Bir Palyaçoyum
  - Music: with Yağmur Sarıgül
  - Lyrics: with Yağmur Sarıgül
- Bitti Rüya
  - Music: with Yağmur Sarıgül
  - Lyrics: with Yağmur Sarıgül, Özgür Can Öney, Haluk Kurosman
- Dursun Zaman
  - Music: with maNga
  - "Lyrics": with Haluk Kurosman
- Fly To Stay Alive
  - Music: with Yağmur Sarıgül
  - Lyrics: Rigael Damar Drake
- İtildik
  - Music: with Yağmur Sarıgül
  - Lyrics: Yağmur Sarıgül
- Cevapsız Sorular
  - Music: with Yağmur Sarıgül
  - Lyrics: with Haluk Kurosman
- Kapkaç
  - Lyrics: with Yağmur Sarıgül
- Sakın Bana Söyleme
  - Lyrics: with Yağmur Sarıgül

Preceded by Hadise with Düm Tek Tek	Turkey in the Eurovision Song Contest; 2010 (as part of maNga)	Succeeded by Yüksek Sadakat with Live It Up
