= Turkey in the Eurovision Song Contest 2010 =

- Eurovision Song Contest 2010
- Participating broadcaster: Türkiye Radyo ve Televizyon Kurumu (TRT)
- Country: Turkey
- Selection process: Internal selection
- Announcement date: Artist: 12 January 2010; Song: 3 March 2010

Competing entry
- Song: "We Could Be the Same"
- Artist: Manga
- Songwriters: Evren Ozdemir; Fiona Movery Akıncı; Yağmur Sarıgül; Ferman Akgül; Özgür Can Öney; Efe Yılmaz; Cem Bahtiyar

Placement
- Semi-final result: Qualified (1st, 118 points)
- Final result: 2nd, 170 points

Participation chronology

Turkey was represented at the Eurovision Song Contest 2010 with the song "We Could Be the Same", written by Evren Ozdemir, Fiona Movery Akıncı, and the band Manga, and performed by maNga themselves. The Turkish participating broadcaster, Türkiye Radyo ve Televizyon Kurumu (TRT), internally selected its entry for the contest.

Turkey was drawn to compete in the second semi-final of the Eurovision Song Contest which took place on 27 May 2010. Performing during the show in position 17, "We Could Be the Same" was announced among the top 10 entries of the second semi-final and therefore qualified to compete in the final on 29 May. It was later revealed that Turkey placed 1st out of the 17 participating countries in the semi-final with 118 points. In the final, Turkey performed in position 14 and placed 2nd out of the 25 participating countries, scoring 170 points.

== Before Eurovision ==
=== Internal selection ===
Following Hadise's fourth place in 2009 with the song "Düm Tek Tek", several artists were rumoured in Turkish media as potential Turkish representatives for the Eurovision Song Contest 2010, including singers Murat Boz, Tarkan and Ziynet Sali. Tarkan was tipped as the favourite to represent Turkey with agreements being confirmed, however this was later denied by both TRT and the artist's management. Nazan Öncel was rumoured to be writing the Turkish Eurovision 2010 entry, however Öncel denied any contact with the broadcaster but mentioned an interest in writing a Eurovision entry for Turkey. On 22 September 2009, it was revealed that Ajda Pekkan (who represented Turkey in 1980) had been approached by TRT but declined the offer as she did not want to interfere with younger artists. Five artists were later reported by the media as candidates: Deniz Arcak, Hadise, Manga, Şebnem Ferah, and Sibel Tüzün (who represented Turkey in 2006), with Manga being the favourite after winning the "Best Turkish Act" and "Best European Act" at the MTV Europe Music Awards 2009. The band later stated that they were yet to be approached by TRT but would accept the offer should they receive one.

On 7 December 2009, TRT opened the suggestions for the public to nominate potential artists for consideration until 11 December 2009. Three artists were shortlisted following public input: Emre Aydın, Manga and Şebnem Ferah and were therefore approached by TRT. On 2 January 2010, Ferah declined the offer stating that Eurovision was no longer a musical contest. On 7 January 2010, TRT announced that they had reached a preliminary agreement with Manga to represent Turkey in Eurovision following the refusal of Aydın. Manga was confirmed as the Turkish representative on 12 January. Three songs, all written in English, were submitted by the band to the broadcaster in February 2010 and a ten-member selection committee selected "We Could Be the Same" as the song they would perform at the contest.

On 3 March 2010, "We Could Be the Same" was presented to the public during a press conference that took place at the TRT Tepebaşı Studios in Istanbul, broadcast on TRT 1 as well as online via the broadcaster's official website trt.net.tr. In addition to the presentation of the song, the band performed a mini concert during the press conference. The song was written by Evren Ozdemir, Fiona Movery Akıncı, as well as Manga themselves.

== At Eurovision ==
Turkey competed in the second semi-final of the contest on 27 May, performing in the 17th slot, and qualified for the final. Turkey came 1st with 118 points: the public awarded Turkey 2nd place with 119 points and the jury awarded also 2nd place with 93 points. In the Final on 29 May, Manga came 2nd with 170 points. They performed in the 14th slot. The public awarded Turkey 2nd place with 177 points and the jury awarded 8th place with 119 points.

=== Voting ===
==== Points awarded to Turkey ====
Points awarded to Turkey (Semi-final 2)
Score	Country
12 points	Azerbaijan; Bulgaria
10 points	Denmark; Sweden; Ukraine
8 points	Croatia; Ireland; Lithuania; Switzerland; United Kingdom
7 points	Netherlands; Romania
6 points	Georgia
5 points	
4 points	
3 points	Slovenia
2 points	
1 point	Norway

Points awarded to Turkey (Final)
Score	Country
12 points	Azerbaijan; Croatia; France
10 points	Bosnia and Herzegovina; Bulgaria; Germany; Macedonia; United Kingdom
8 points	Albania; Netherlands; Romania; Ukraine
7 points	
6 points	Belgium; Denmark; Estonia
5 points	Georgia; Sweden
4 points	Lithuania
3 points	Belarus; Finland; Serbia; Spain; Switzerland
2 points	Norway; Slovenia
1 point	Ireland

==== Points awarded by Turkey ====
Points awarded by Turkey (Semi-final 2)
Score	Country
12 points	Azerbaijan
10 points	Georgia
8 points	Romania
7 points	Bulgaria
6 points	Denmark
5 points	Netherlands
4 points	Armenia
3 points	Ukraine
2 points	Sweden
1 point	Ireland

Points awarded by Turkey (Final)
Score	Country
12 points	Azerbaijan
10 points	Germany
8 points	Bosnia and Herzegovina
7 points	Albania
6 points	Armenia
5 points	Georgia
4 points	Russia
3 points	Greece
2 points	Romania
1 point	Ukraine

==== Detailed voting results ====
Televoting results from Turkey (Semi-Final 2)
R/O	Country	Votes	Rank	Points
01	Lithuania	376	12	
02	Armenia	3,071	3	8
03	Israel	403	9	2
04	Denmark	434	8	3
05	Switzerland	148	16	
06	Sweden	483	7	4
07	Azerbaijan	13,352	1	12
08	Ukraine	829	5	6
09	Netherlands	389	10	1
10	Romania	1,040	4	7
11	Slovenia	167	15	
12	Ireland	293	13	
13	Bulgaria	560	6	5
14	Cyprus	384	11	
15	Croatia	272	14	
16	Georgia	3,422	2	10
17	Turkey			

Detailed voting results from Turkey (Final)
R/O	Country	Results					Points
R/O	Country	Jury	Televoting			Combined	Points
R/O	Country	Jury	Votes	Rank	Points	Combined	Points
01	Azerbaijan	12	58,474	1	12	24	12
02	Spain		2,122	14			
03	Norway	1	594	22		1	
04	Moldova	5	2,455	11		5	
05	Cyprus		900	20			
06	Bosnia and Herzegovina	8	4,627	6	5	13	8
07	Belgium		1,794	15			
08	Serbia		1,219	18			
09	Belarus		756	21			
10	Ireland		2,455	11			
11	Greece		4,716	5	6	6	3
12	United Kingdom		521	23			
13	Georgia	2	6,393	4	7	9	5
14	Turkey						
15	Albania	10	2,779	10	1	11	7
16	Iceland		1,377	17			
17	Ukraine	4	3,377	9	2	6	1
18	France		4,225	7	4	4	
19	Romania	3	3,882	8	3	6	2
20	Russia	7	2,218	13		7	4
21	Armenia		11,154	2	10	10	6
22	Germany	6	10,787	3	8	14	10
23	Portugal		266	24			
24	Israel		1,111	19			
25	Denmark		1,731	16			
