= Studio Kekkonen =

Recording studio in Helsinki, Finland

Studio Kekkonen is a recording studio in Helsinki, Finland. Owned and operated by Mikko Raita, Janne Riionheimo and Julius Mauranen. Clients Include Ana Johnsson, Apocalyptica, Tuomo, Deep Insight and Bleak.

Mikko Raita mixed the 2025 Oscar Best Animated Feature winning film, Flow music at Studio Kekkonen.
