= Sarıgül =

Sarıgül is a Turkish surname. Notable people with the surname include:

- Mustafa Sarıgül (born 1956), Turkish writer, entrepreneur, and politician
- Yağmur Sarıgül (born 1979), Turkish songwriter and guitarist

== See also ==
- Sarıgül, Elâzığ
