= MTV Europe Music Award for Best Greek Act =

Category of MTV Europe Music Awards

The following is a list of the MTV Europe Music Award winners and nominees for Best Greek Act. Viewers vote online, and the winner of this award is then entered in the running for the Best European Act, which is then further narrowed down by online voters to five acts.

== Winners and nominees ==
Winners are listed first and highlighted in bold.

=== 2000s ===
Year	Artist	Ref
2008
2008	**Stereo Mike**	
2008	Cyanna	
2008	Matisse	
2008	Mihalis Hatzigiannis	
2008	Stavento	
2009
2009	**Helena Paparizou**	
2009	Monika	
2009	Matisse	
2009	Onirama	
2009	Professional Sinnerz	

=== 2010s ===
Year	Artist	Ref
2010
2010	**Sakis Rouvas**	
2010	Myronas Stratis	
2010	Melisses	
2010	Stavento	
2010	Vegas	
2011
2011	**Mark F. Angelo & Shaya**	
2011	Κokkina Xalia	
2011	Melisses	
2011	Onirama	
2011	Panos Mouzourakis & Kostis Maraveyas	
2012
2012	**Vegas**	
2012	Claydee	
2012	Goin' Through	
2012	Melisses	
2012	Nikki Ponte	
2013
2013	**Demy**	
2013	Goin' Through	
2013	Michalis Hatzigiannis & Midenistis	
2013	Pink Noisy	
2013	Sakis Rouvas	
2014
2014	**Vegas**	
2014	Despina Vandi	
2014	Kostas Martakis	
2014	Thanos Petrelis	
2014	Demy	
2015
2015	**Giorgos Mazonakis**	
2015	Stavento	
2015	R.E.C	
2015	Despina Vandi	
2015	Giorgos Sampanis	
