= MTV Europe Music Award for Best R&B =

Category of MTV Europe Music Awards

The MTV Europe Music Award for Best R&B is an award presented at the MTV Europe Music Awards. It was first given out during the 1997 ceremony and retired after the 2006 ceremony, but was later brought back for the 2022 ceremony. Alicia Keys is the most awarded artist in this category, with three wins and Beyoncé holds the record for the most nominations, with six nods.

== Winners and nominees ==
Winners are listed first and highlighted in bold.

† indicates an MTV Video Music Award for Best R&B Video–winning artist.

‡ indicates an MTV Video Music Award for Best R&B Video–nominated artist that same year.

=== 1990s ===
Year	Artist	Ref
1997
1997	**Blackstreet**	
1997	Toni Braxton	
1997	Ginuwine	
1997	Michael Jackson	
1997	R. Kelly	
1998	—N/a	
1999
1999	**Whitney Houston ‡**	
1999	Mariah Carey	
1999	Lauryn Hill †	
1999	Jennifer Lopez	
1999	TLC	

=== 2000s ===
Year	Artist	Ref
2000
2000	**Jennifer Lopez**	
2000	Aaliyah	
2000	Destiny's Child †	
2000	Janet Jackson	
2000	Sisqo	
2001
2001	**Craig David**	
2001	Destiny's Child ‡	
2001	Janet Jackson	
2001	Wyclef Jean	
2001	Outkast	
2002
2002	**Alicia Keys ‡**	
2002	Ashanti ‡	
2002	Beyoncé	
2002	Mary J. Blige †	
2002	Jennifer Lopez	
2003
2003	**Beyoncé †**	
2003	Ashanti ‡	
2003	Mary J. Blige	
2003	Craig David	
2003	Jennifer Lopez	
2004
2004	**Alicia Keys †**	
2004	Beyoncé ‡	
2004	Kelis	
2004	Outkast	
2004	Usher ‡	
2005
2005	**Alicia Keys †**	
2005	Mariah Carey ‡	
2005	John Legend ‡	
2005	Mario	
2005	Usher ‡	
2006
2006	**Rihanna**	
2006	Beyoncé †	
2006	Mary J. Blige ‡	
2006	Outkast	
2006	Pharrell	

=== 2020s ===
Year	Artist	Ref
2022
2022	**Chlöe ‡**	
2022	H.E.R. ‡	
2022	Khalid	
2022	Giveon	
2022	Summer Walker ‡	
2022	SZA ‡	
2023
2023	**Chris Brown ‡**	
2023	Chlöe ‡	
2023	Steve Lacy	
2023	Summer Walker	
2023	SZA †	
2023	Usher	
2024
2024	**Tyla ‡**	
2024	Kehlani	
2024	SZA †	
2024	Victoria Monét ‡	
2024	Usher ‡	
2024	Tinashe	

== See also ==
- MTV Europe Music Award for MTV Amour
- MTV Europe Music Award for Best Urban
- MTV Video Music Award for Best R&B Video
