= MTV Europe Music Award for Best Turkish Act =

Category of MTV Europe Music Awards

The following is a list of the MTV Europe Music Award winners and nominees for Best Turkish Act. Both Emre Aydın and maNga have subsequently gone on to win the award for Best European Act.

== 2000s ==
| Year | Winner | Nominees |
|---|---|---|
| 2007 | Ceza | Kenan Doğulu; Sertab Erener; Nil Karaibrahimgil; Teoman |
| 2008 | Emre Aydın | Hayko Cepkin; Hadise; Sagopa Kajmer; Hande Yener |
| 2009 | maNga | Bedük; Atiye; Kenan Doğulu; Nil Karaibrahimgil |

== 2010s ==
| Year | Winner | Nominees |
|---|---|---|
| 2011 | Atiye | Hadise; Duman; Cartel; Mor ve Ötesi |
