= Mikko Raita =

Finnish audio engineer

Mikko Raita is a Helsinki, Finland based music mixing and recording engineer as well as a producer, guitar player and co-owner of Studio Kekkonen. Clients include Apocalyptica, Sunrise Avenue, Tuomo, Deep Insight, Bleak, Ana Johnsson and Stratovarius.

Raita is currently active especially as a film and TV music mixer, and is the music mixer for 2025 Best Animated Feature Oscar Winner, Flow.
