= 2009 MTV Europe Music Awards =

Music awards show held in Berlin, Germany

- Date: 5 November 2009
- Location: O2 World, Berlin, Germany
- Hosted by: Katy Perry

Highlights
- Most awards: Beyoncé (3)
- Most nominations: Lady Gaga and Kings of Leon (5)

Television/radio coverage
- Network: MTV Networks International (Europe)

The MTV Europe Music Awards 2009 took place in Berlin, Germany at the O2 World and Brandenburg Gate on 5 November 2009. The awards ceremony was presented by Katy Perry for a 2nd consecutive year. It was the fourth time that the MTV Europe Music Awards were hosted in Germany and the second time that they were hosted in Berlin, since the inaugural edition of the MTV Europe Music Awards also took place there. Thus Berlin became the first city to host the event twice.

Nominations for regional awards were announced on 1 September 2009, followed by those of the main awards on September 21, 2009. Pete Wentz was the host for the 2009 MTV Europe Music Awards webcast.

Though the MTV EMAs have traditionally been advertised as Europe's premiere music event, few European artists received nominations in key categories.

The 2009 MTV Europe Music Awards logo and promos were designed in-house by MTV World Design Studio in Milan and Buenos Aires with additional input by Swedish graphic design company Kungen & Hertigen.

== Nominations ==
Winners are in bold text.

Best Song	Best Video
**Beyoncé — "Halo"**: David Guetta (featuring Kelly Rowland) — "When Love Takes Over"; Kings of Leon — "Use Somebody"; Lady Gaga — "Poker Face"; The Black Eyed Peas — "I Gotta Feeling"	**Beyoncé — "Single Ladies (Put a Ring on It)"**: Britney Spears — "Circus"; Eminem — "We Made You"; Katy Perry — "Waking Up in Vegas"; Shakira — "She Wolf"
Best Female	Best Male
**Beyoncé**: Katy Perry; Lady Gaga; Leona Lewis; Shakira	**Eminem**: Jay-Z; Kanye West; Mika; Robbie Williams
Best Group	Best New Act
**Tokio Hotel**: Green Day; Jonas Brothers; Kings of Leon; The Black Eyed Peas	**Lady Gaga**: Daniel Merriweather; La Roux; Pixie Lott; Taylor Swift
Best Rock	Best Alternative
**Green Day**: Foo Fighters; Kings of Leon; Linkin Park; U2	**Placebo**: Muse; Paramore; The Killers; The Prodigy
Best Urban	Best Live Act
**Jay-Z**: Ciara; Eminem; Kanye West; T.I.	**U2**: Beyoncé; Green Day; Kings of Leon; Lady Gaga
Best World Stage Performance	Best Push Act
**Linkin Park**: Coldplay; Kid Rock; Kings of Leon; Lady Gaga	**Pixie Lott**: Daniel Merriweather; Hockey; Kesha; Little Boots; Metro Station; The Veronicas; White Lies
Best European Act	
**Manga**: Deep Insight; Dima Bilan; Doda; Lost	
Free Your Mind
**Mikhail Gorbachev**

== Regional nominations ==
Winners are in bold text.

Best Adria Act	Best Baltic Act
**Lollobrigida Girls**: Darkwood Dub; Dubioza Kolektiv; Elvis Jackson; Superhiks	**Leon Somov & Jazzu**: Chungin & the Cats of Destiny; DJ Ella; Flamingo; Popidiot
Best Danish Act	Best Dutch & Belgian Act
**Medina**: Dúné; Jooks; L.O.C.; Outlandish	**Esmée Denters**: Alain Clark; Fedde le Grand; Milow; The Black Box Revelation
Best Finnish Act	Best French Act
**Deep Insight**: Apulanta; Cheek; Disco Ensemble; Happoradio	**Orelsan**: David Guetta; Olivia Ruiz; Rohff; Sliimy
Best German Act	Best Greek Act
**Silbermond**: Jan Delay; Peter Fox; Söhne Mannheims; Sportfreunde Stiller	**Helena Paparizou**: Matisse; Monika; Onirama; Professional Sinnerz
Best Hungarian Act	Best Israeli Act
**The Kolin**: Esclin Syndo; The Idoru; The Moog; Zagar	**Ninet Tayeb**: Assaf Amdursky; Asaf Avidan & the Mojos; Infected Mushroom; Terry Poison
Best Italian Act	Best Norwegian Act
**Lost**: Giusy Ferreri; J-Ax; Tiziano Ferro; Zero Assoluto	**Yoga Fire**: Donkeyboy; Maria Mena; Paperboys; Röyksopp
Best Polish Act	Best Portuguese Act
**Doda**: Afromental; Ania Dąbrowska; Ewa Farna; Jamal	**Xutos e Pontapés**: Buraka Som Sistema; David Fonseca; Os Pontos Negros; X-Wife
Best Romanian Act	Best Russian Act
**Inna**: David Deejay (featuring Dony); Puya (featuring George Hora); Smiley; Tom Boxer (featuring Jay)	**Dima Bilan**: Centr; Kasta; Sergey Lazarev; Timati
Best Spanish Act	Best Swedish Act
**We Are Standard**: Fangoria; Macaco; Nena Daconte; Russian Red	**Agnes**: Adiam Dymott; Darin; Mando Diao; Promoe
Best Swiss Act	Best Turkish Act
**Stress**: Lovebugs; Phenomden; Ritschi; Seven	**Manga**: Atiye Deniz; Bedük; Kenan Doğulu; Nil Karaibrahimgil
Best Ukrainian Act	Best UK & Ireland New Act
**Green Grey**: Antytila; Druha Rika; Kamon!!!; Lama	**Pixie Lott**: Florence and the Machine; La Roux; The Saturdays; Tinchy Stryder
Best Arabian Act	
**Joe Ashkar**: Amr Mostafa; Darine Hadchiti; Ramy Sabry; Rashed Al-Majed	

== Performances ==
- Green Day — "Know Your Enemy" / "Minority"
- Katy Perry — "I Gotta Feeling" / "When Love Takes Over" / "Use Somebody" / "Halo" / "Poker Face"
- Beyoncé — "Sweet Dreams"
- Jay-Z and Bridget Kelly — "Empire State of Mind"
- Foo Fighters — "Wheels" / "All My Life"
- U2 — "One" / "Magnificent"
- Shakira — "Did It Again"
- Tokio Hotel — "World Behind My Wall"
- Leona Lewis — "Happy"
- U2 and Jay-Z — "Sunday Bloody Sunday"

== Appearances ==
- Pete Wentz and Bar Refaeli — presented Best Live Act
- Joss Stone and Wladimir Klitschko — presented Best Urban
- David Hasselhoff — presented Best Rock
- Dave Bautista — presented Best Song
- Juliette Lewis and Gillian Deegan — presented Best Alternative
- Lil' Kim — presented Best New Act
- Jean Reno — presented Best Male
- Jonas Brothers — introduced the Michael Jackson tribute
- Joko Winterscheidt and Matthias Schweighöfer — presented Best German Act
- Backstreet Boys — presented Best European Act
- Jesse Metcalfe — presented Best Group
- David Guetta and Asia Argento — presented Best Female
- Miranda Cosgrove and Brody Jenner — presented Best Video

== See also ==
- 2009 MTV Video Music Awards
