= Göksel (singer) =

Turkish singer-songwriter (born 1971)

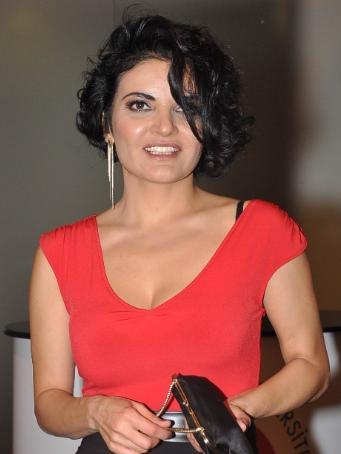
- Göksel in 2016
- Born: Göksel Demirpençe; 25 November 1971 (age 54); Istanbul, Turkey
- Education: Boğaziçi University
- Occupations: Singer-songwriter; producer
- Spouse: Alper Erinç (m. 2003; div. 2007)
- Musical career
- Genres: Pop rock
- Instrument: Guitar
- Years active: 1997–present
- Labels: Karma; Raks; Sony BMG; Avrupa
- Website: www.gokselonline.com

Göksel Demirpençe (born 25 November 1971) is a Turkish singer-songwriter.

== Biography ==
Göksel was born in Istanbul on 25 November 1971. In 1988 she applied to Boğaziçi University to study philosophy. However, she quit her studies to become a professional musician. She started to take private singing lessons and began singing for various orchestras. For two years she was a backing vocalist to Sezen Aksu and Sertab Erener, two of Turkey's most acknowledged female singers.

In September 1997, her first album, entitled Yollar (Roads), was released, of which the first single, "Sabır" (Patience), became a hit.

She released her second album, Körebe (Blind Man's Bluff), in October 2001 under a Sony Music label. Its most successful single was "Depresyondayım" (I'm depressed).

Her third album came out in May 2003 under the title Söz Ver (Promise). That year Göksel gave a successful concert in Babylon with the Greek band, Omega Vibes.

In March 2005, Göksel published her latest album, Arka Bahçem (My Backyard). The album's biggest hit was "Bi seni konuşurum" (I'm only talking about you).

Göksel is also featured in the album of Turkish rock band maNga; their duet called "Dursun zaman" (Time should stop) is popular with radio stations and appears on the soundtrack of the film Sınav (starring Jean-Claude Van Damme).

Göksel's fifth album, entitled Ay'da Yürüdüm (I Walked on the Moon), was released on 13 April 2007. The first single is titled "Yarabbi Şükür" (Thanks God). The album features a duet with Ferman Akgül, the singer of maNga and renowned Turkish rock star Teoman. The song's title is "Taş Bebek" (Doll) and according to Göksel, the song was written (together with Akgül, Alper Erinç and Teoman) to show how much the women have to suffer to be always beautiful. Göksel states that women are designed to do much more useful things than just dolling themselves up for the sake of men, so she wrote this song to remind women that beauty lies inside and not in clothes or make-up.

She released her sixth studio album Mektubumu Buldun mu? (Did you find my letter?) in May 2009, in which she performed covers of popular Turkish songs. In September 2009, her previous company released a compilation best-of album, which allegedly released without artist's permission.

On 28 April 2010 Göksel released her second covers album, seventh over all, called "Hayat Rüya Gibi" (English: Life is like a dream). She did a cover of "Paroles Paroles" (Dalida) named "Palavra" (Lies) and a ballad with the name of "Tek Başına" (Alone).

In 2018, Göksel collaborated with electronic musician Hey Douglas to create a song called "Duruyor Dünya" (The world is stopping).

== Discography ==
=== Albums ===
Year	Released	Title	Label
1997	3 September 1997	Yollar (Roads)	Karma Müzik Yapım
2001	4 October 2001	Körebe (Blind Man's Bluff)	Sony Music
2003	29 May 2003	Söz ver (Promise)	Sony Music
2005	17 March 2005	Arka Bahçem (My Backyard)	Sony Music
2007	15 April 2007	Ay'da Yürüdüm (I Walked on the Moon)	Sony Music
2009	May 2009	Mektubumu Buldun mu? (Did You Find my Letter?)	Avrupa Müzik
2009	17 September 2009	The Best of Göksel	Sony Music
2010	26 April 2010	Hayat Rüya Gibi (Life is Like a Dream)	Avrupa Müzik
2012	18 January 2012	Bende Bi' Aşk Var (I Have a Love)	Avrupa Müzik
2015	14 January 2015	Sen Orda Yoksun (You're not There)	Avrupa Müzik
2024	10 May 2024	B'Aşka Şarkılar (Different Songs)	Soles Music
2026	15 May 2026	Rüyaların İşi (Dreams' Work)	Soles Music

=== Singles ===
Year	Title
2017	"Tam da Şu An"
2019	"Bu da Geçecek"
2019	"Hiç Yok"
2020	"Ben Fena Aşığım"
2020	"Lütufsuz Yaz"
2021	"Çölde Bi' Vaha"
2022	"Haklıydın"
2022	"Canım"
2022	"Sen Varsın"
2023	"Burda Kalayım"
2023	"Başkası"
2024	"Bıçak"
2024	"Boş Vere Boş Vere"
2024	"Bir Günah Gibi"
2025	"Pardon"
2025	"Olmaz mı?"
2026	"Peki Öyle Olsun"
2026	"Alev Alev"

=== Charts ===
List of singles, release date and album name
Single	Year	Peak	Album
Single	Year	TR	Album
"Yarabbi Şükür"	2007	3	Ay'da Yürüdüm
"Taş Bebek"	2007	—	Ay'da Yürüdüm
"Yabani Otlar"	2008	10	Ay'da Yürüdüm
"Dudaklarında Arzu"	2009	17	Mektubumu Buldun mu?
"Ağlamak Güzeldir"	2010	—	Mektubumu Buldun mu?
"Senden Başka"	2010	—	Mektubumu Buldun mu?
"Sevil Neşelen"	2010	—	Hayat Rüya Gibi
"Acıyor"	2012	3	Bende Bi' Aşk Var
"Uzaktan"	2012	2	Bende Bi' Aşk Var
"Yalnız Kuş"	2012	2	Bende Bi' Aşk Var
"Aşkın Yalanmış"	2013	—	Bende Bi' Aşk Var
"Sen Orda Yoksun"	2015	5	Sen Orda Yoksun
"Denize Bıraksam"	2015	4	Sen Orda Yoksun
"Gittiğinde"	2015	—	Sen Orda Yoksun
"Bu da Geçecek"	2019	1	Non-album single
"Hiç Yok"	2019	1	Non-album single
"—" indicates that the songs were not included in the lists or the results were not disclosed.

=== Music videos ===
Year	Song	Album	Director
1997	"Sabır"	Yollar	—N/a
1997	"Uzun Uzun Yollar"	Yollar	Cansu Akbel
2001	"Depresyondayım"	Körebe	Murad Küçük
2001	"Bir İhtimal"	Körebe	—N/a
2001	"Günün Birinde"	Körebe	—N/a
2003	"Hastasıyım"	Söz Ver	—N/a
2003	"Allı Pullu"	Söz Ver	Mahir Akyol
2003	"Firar"	Söz Ver	—N/a
2003	"Karşı Kıyıya"	Atmosfera	—N/a
2004	"Dursun Zaman"	MaNga	Onur Uysal
2005	"Arka Bahçemde"	Arka Bahçem	Devrin Usta
2005	"Bi Seni Konuşurum"	Arka Bahçem	—N/a
2005	"Benden Geçti Aşk"	Arka Bahçem	—N/a
2005	"Karar Verdim"	Arka Bahçem	Murad Küçük
2007	"Yarabbi Şükür"	Ay'da Yürüdüm	Murad Küçük
2007	"Taş Bebek"	Ay'da Yürüdüm	Murad Küçük
2008	"Yabani Otlar"	Ay'da Yürüdüm	Mike Norman, Yon Thomas
2009	"Dudaklarında Arzu"	Mektubumu Buldun mu?	Kemal Başbuğ
2010	"Ağlamak Güzeldir"	Mektubumu Buldun mu?	Gürcan Keltek
2010	"Senden Başka"	Mektubumu Buldun mu?	Walky Talky
2010	"Sevil Neşelen"	Hayat Rüya Gibi	Kemal Başbuğ
2012	"Acıyor"	Bende Bi Aşk Var	Murat Onbul
2012	"Uzaktan"	Bende Bi Aşk Var	Murat Onbul
2012	"Yalnız Kuş"	Bende Bi Aşk Var	Murat Onbul
2013	"Aşkın Yalanmış"	Bende Bi Aşk Var	Murat Onbul
2015	"Sen Orda Yoksun"	Sen Orda Yoksun	Murat Onbul
2015	"Denize Bıraksam"	Sen Orda Yoksun	Charles Richards
2015	"Gittiğinde"	Sen Orda Yoksun	Bora Tarhan
2016	"Isırgan"	Sen Orda Yoksun	Murat Joker
2017	"Tam da Şu An"	Tam da Şu An	Bedran Güzel
2017	"Unutulmaz"	Mirkelam Şarkıları	Gürcak Keltek
2019	"Bu da Geçecek"	Bu da Geçecek	Murat Onbul
2019	"Hiç Yok"	Hiç Yok	Koray Birand
2020	"Ben Fena Aşığım"	Ben Fena Aşığım	Koray Birand
2020	"Lütufsuz Yaz"	Lütufsuz Yaz	Eran Hakim, Evren Topaloğlu
2021	"Çölde Bi' Vaha"	Çölde Bi' Vaha	Aytekin Yalçın
2022	"Canım"	Canım	Elif Demiralp
2022	"Sen Varsın"	Sen Varsın	Aytekin Yalçın
2023	"Burda Kalayım"	Burda Kalayım	Aytekin Yalçın
2024	"Bıçak"	Bıçak	
2025	"Pardon"	Pardon	Abdullah Yazıc
2025	"Olmaz mı?"	Olmaz mı?	Abdullah Yazıc
2026	"Peki Öyle Olsun"	Rüyaların İşi	Aytekin Yalçın
2026	"Alev Alev"	Rüyaların İşi	Aytekin Yalçın
2026	"Be Oğlum"	Rüyaların İşi	Aytekin Yalçın

== Filmography ==
Year	Title	Role	Notes
2012	Yalan Dünya	Herself	Guest appearance
2012	Yol Ayrımı	Seyyan	Guest appearance
2020	Kalk Gidelim	Herself	Guest appearance
