= 2008 MTV Europe Music Awards =

Music awards show held in Liverpool, England

- Date: 6 November 2008
- Location: Echo Arena, Liverpool, England
- Hosted by: Katy Perry
- Most awards: Britney Spears, Thirty Seconds to Mars (2)
- Most nominations: Britney Spears (6)

Television/radio coverage
- Network: MTV Networks International (Europe)

The 2008 MTV EMAs (also known as the MTV Europe Music Awards) were held at the Echo Arena in Liverpool, England, on 6 November 2008. It was hosted by Katy Perry. This was the second time the awards have taken place in England.

== Nominations ==
Winners are in bold text.

Most Addictive Track	Video Star
**Pink — "So What"**: Coldplay — "Viva la Vida"; Duffy — "Mercy"; Katy Perry — "I Kissed a Girl"; Kid Rock — "All Summer Long"	**Thirty Seconds to Mars — "A Beautiful Lie"**: Madonna (featuring Justin Timberlake and Timbaland) — "4 Minutes"; Santigold — "L.E.S. Artistes"; Snoop Dogg — "Sensual Seduction"; Weezer — "Pork and Beans"
Album of the Year	Best New Act
**Britney Spears — Blackout**: Alicia Keys — As I Am; Coldplay — Viva la Vida or Death and All His Friends; Duffy — Rockferry; Leona Lewis — Spirit	**Katy Perry**: Duffy; Jonas Brothers; Miley Cyrus; OneRepublic
Rock Out	Ultimate Urban
**Thirty Seconds to Mars**: Linkin Park; Metallica; Paramore; Slipknot	**Kanye West**: Alicia Keys; Beyoncé; Chris Brown; Lil Wayne
Best Headliner	Best European Act
**Tokio Hotel**: Foo Fighters; Linkin Park; Metallica; The Cure	**Emre Aydın**: Dima Bilan; Finley; Leona Lewis; Shiri Maimon
Best Act of 2008	Best Act Ever
**Britney Spears**: Amy Winehouse; Coldplay; Leona Lewis; Rihanna	**Rick Astley**: Britney Spears; Christina Aguilera; Green Day; Tokio Hotel; U2
Artist's Choice
**Lil Wayne**
Ultimate Legend Award
**Sir Paul McCartney**

== Regional nominations ==
Winners are in bold text.

Best Adria Act	Best Baltic Act
**Elvir Laković Laka**: Jinx; Leeloojamais; Marčelo; The Beat Fleet	**Happyendless**: Detlef Zoo; Jurga; Kerli; Rulers of the Deep
Best Danish Act	Best Dutch & Belgian Act
**Suspekt**: Alphabeat; Infernal; L.O.C.; Volbeat	**De Jeugd van Tegenwoordig**: Alain Clark; Kraak & Smaak; Pete Philly & Perquisite; Room Eleven
Best Finnish Act	Best French Act
**Nightwish**: Anna Abreu; Children Of Bodom; Disco Ensemble; H.I.M.	**Zaho**: BB Brunes; David Guetta; Sefyu
Best German Act	Best Greek Act
**Fettes Brot**: Die Ärzte; MIA.; Sido; Hurensöhne Mannheims	**Stereo Mike**: Cyanna; Matisse; Mihalis Hatzigiannis; Stavento
Best Hungarian Act	Best Israeli Act
**Gonzo**: Beat Dis; Irie Maffia; The Unbending Trees; Žagar	**Shiri Maimon**: Asaf Avidan; Infected Mushroom; Izabo; Kutiman
Best Italian Act	Best Norwegian Act
**Finley**: Baustelle; Fabri Fibra; Marracash; Sonohra	**Erik og Kriss**: Ida Maria; Kakkmaddafakka; Karpe Diem; Madcon
Best Polish Act	Best Portuguese Act
**Feel**: Afromental; Ania Dabrowska; Kasia Cerekwicka; Hey	**Buraka Som Sistema**: Rita Redshoes; Sam The Kid; Slimmy; The Vicious Five
Best Romanian Act	Best Russian Act
**Morandi**: Andra; Crazy Loop; Smiley; Tom Boxer with Anca Parghel and Fly Project	**Dima Bilan**: Band'Eros; Nastya Zadorozhnaya; Sergey Lazarev; Timati
Best Spanish Act	Best Swedish Act
**Amaral**: La Casa Azul; Pereza; Pignoise; Porta	**Neverstore**: Adam Tensta; Kleerup; Lazee; Veronica Maggio
Best Turkish Act	Best Ukrainian Act
**Emre Aydın**: Hadise; Hayko Cepkin; Sagopa Kajmer; Hande Yener	**Quest Pistols**: BoomBox; Druha Rika; Esthetic Education; S.K.A.Y.
Best UK & Ireland Act	Best Arabia Act
**Leona Lewis**: Adele; Duffy; The Ting Tings; The Wombats	**Karl Wolf**: Abri; Carole Samaha; Fayez; Mohamed Hamaki

== Performances ==
- Katy Perry — "I Kissed a Girl"
- Beyoncé — "If I Were a Boy"
- Take That — "Greatest Day"
- The Killers — "Human"
- Kanye West — "Love Lockdown"
- Estelle and Kanye West — "American Boy"
- The Ting Tings — "That's Not My Name"
- Kid Rock — "So Hott / All Summer Long"
- Duffy — "Mercy"
- Pink — "So What"
- Katy Perry — "Hot n Cold"
- Zaho - La roue tourne

== Appearances ==
- Sugababes — presented Best Song
- Michael Owen and Anastacia — presented Best Live Act
- Travis McCoy and Solange Knowles — presented Best Rock
- Craig David — presented Best Album
- Grace Jones — presented Best New Act
- Kerry Katona and Dirk — presented Best Video
- Perez Hilton and Katy Perry — presented Best Act Ever
- Leona Lewis — presented Best Urban
- Kelly Rowland — presented Artist's Choice Award
- Estelle and Tim Cahill — presented Best Act
- Bono — presented Ultimate Legend Award
- Lauri Ylönen and Tiziano Ferro — presented Best European Act

== See also ==
- 2008 MTV Video Music Awards
