= MTV Europe Music Award for Best Baltic Act =

Music award

The following is a list of the MTV Europe Music Award winners and nominees for Best Baltic Act.

== 2000s ==
Year	Winner	Nominees
2006	Brainstorm	Inculto; Skamp; Tanel Padar; Vanilla Ninja
2007	Jurga	Double Faced Eels; Skamp; The Sun; Tribes of the City
2008	Happyendless	Detlef Zoo; Jurga; Kerli; Rulers of the Deep
2009	Leon Somov & Jazzu	Chungin & the Cats of Destiny; DJ Ella; Flamingo; Popidiot
