= MTV Europe Music Award for Best New Act =

Category of MTV Europe Music Awards

The MTV Europe Music Award for Best New Act is one of the four original general categories that have been given out since the first annual MTV Europe Music Awards in 1994. Originally called Breakthrough Artist (1994—1999), it was briefly retitled to Future Sounds in 2006 and the winner was chosen by their peers. In 2007 the category featured only European artists chosen by viewers in each region of Europe, every day the artist with the fewest votes was eliminated and the winner would play live at the EMAs. In 2008 the award was once again retitled, this time to its current name. The current holder by this award is Benson Boone.

== Winners and nominees ==
Winners are listed first and highlighted in bold.

† indicates an MTV Video Music Award for Best New Artist–winning artist.
‡ indicates an MTV Video Music Award for Best New Artist–nominated artist that same year.

=== 1990s ===
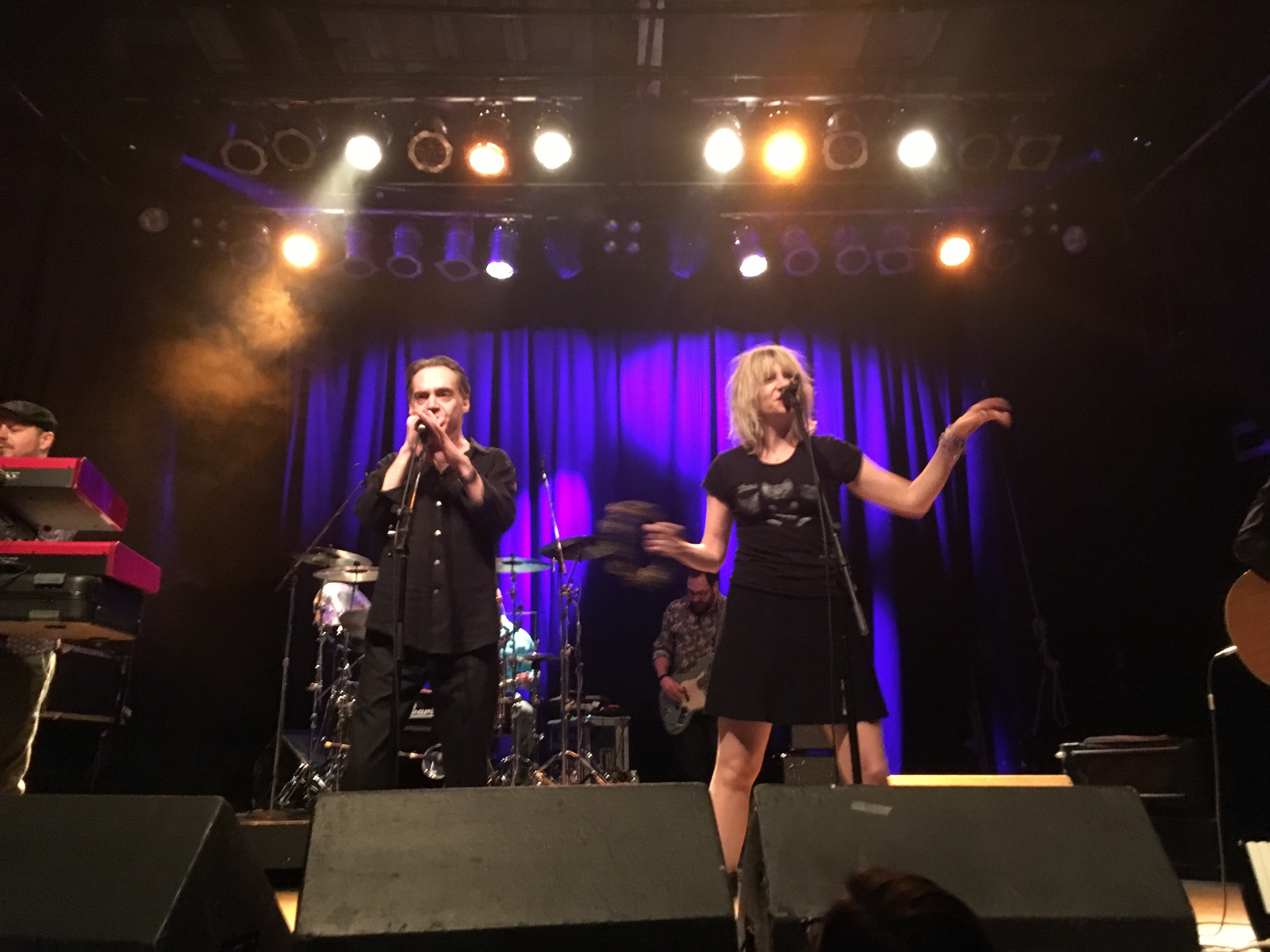
Inaugural award winner group Crash Test Dummies.

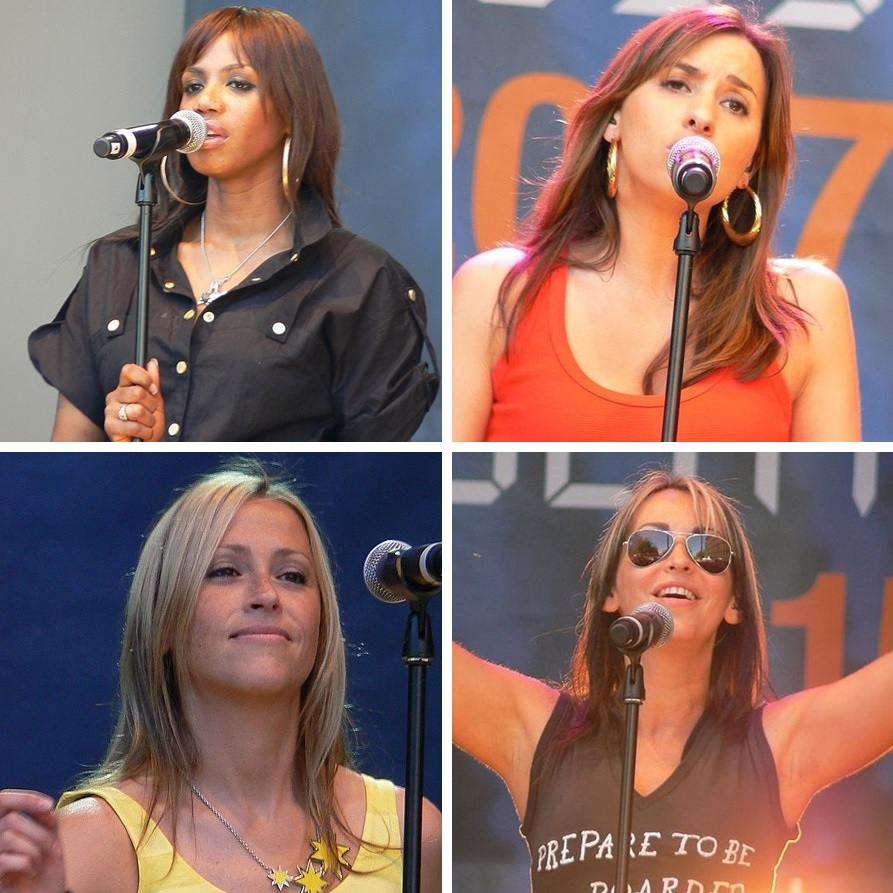
All Saints was the first girl group to win the category.

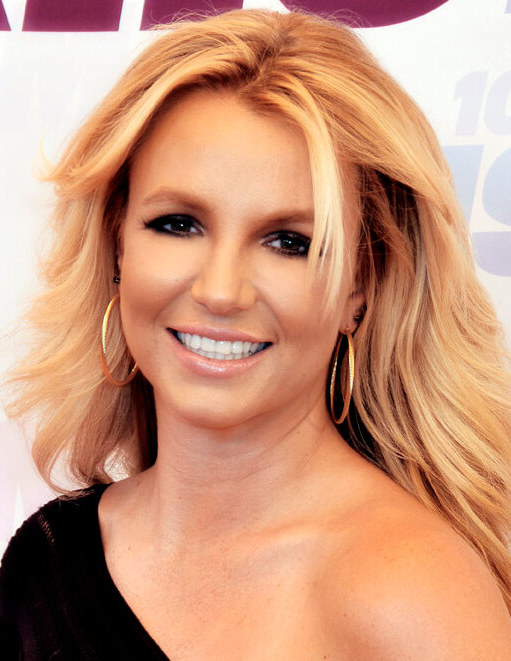
Britney Spears was the first solo act to win the category.

Year	Artist	Ref
1994
1994	**Crash Test Dummies**	
1994	Beck	
1994	Deus	
1994	Therapy?	
1994	Whale	
1995
1995	**Dog Eat Dog**	
1995	H-Blockx	
1995	Alanis Morissette †	
1995	Portishead	
1995	Weezer	
1996
1996	**Garbage**	
1996	The Cardigans	
1996	The Fugees	
1996	Pulp	
1996	Skunk Anansie	
1997
1997	**Hanson ‡**	
1997	Meredith Brooks ‡	
1997	Puff Daddy	
1997	No Doubt	
1997	Spice Girls	
1998
1998	**All Saints**	
1998	Aqua	
1998	Eagle Eye Cherry	
1998	Five	
1998	Natalie Imbruglia †	
1999
1999	**Britney Spears**	
1999	Eminem †	
1999	Jennifer Lopez ‡	
1999	Vengaboys	
1999	Westlife	

=== 2000s ===
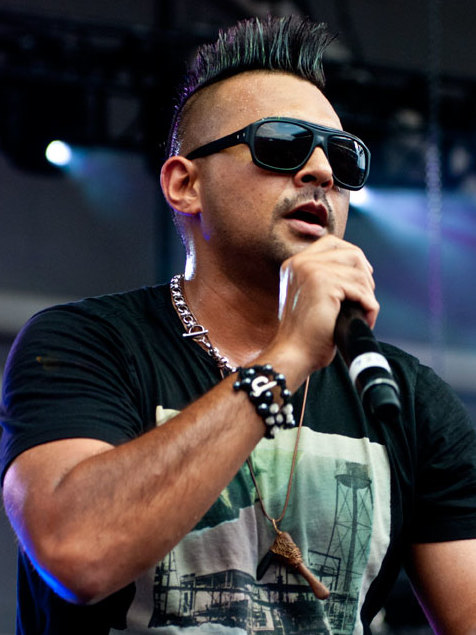
Sean Paul was the first solo male act to win the award.

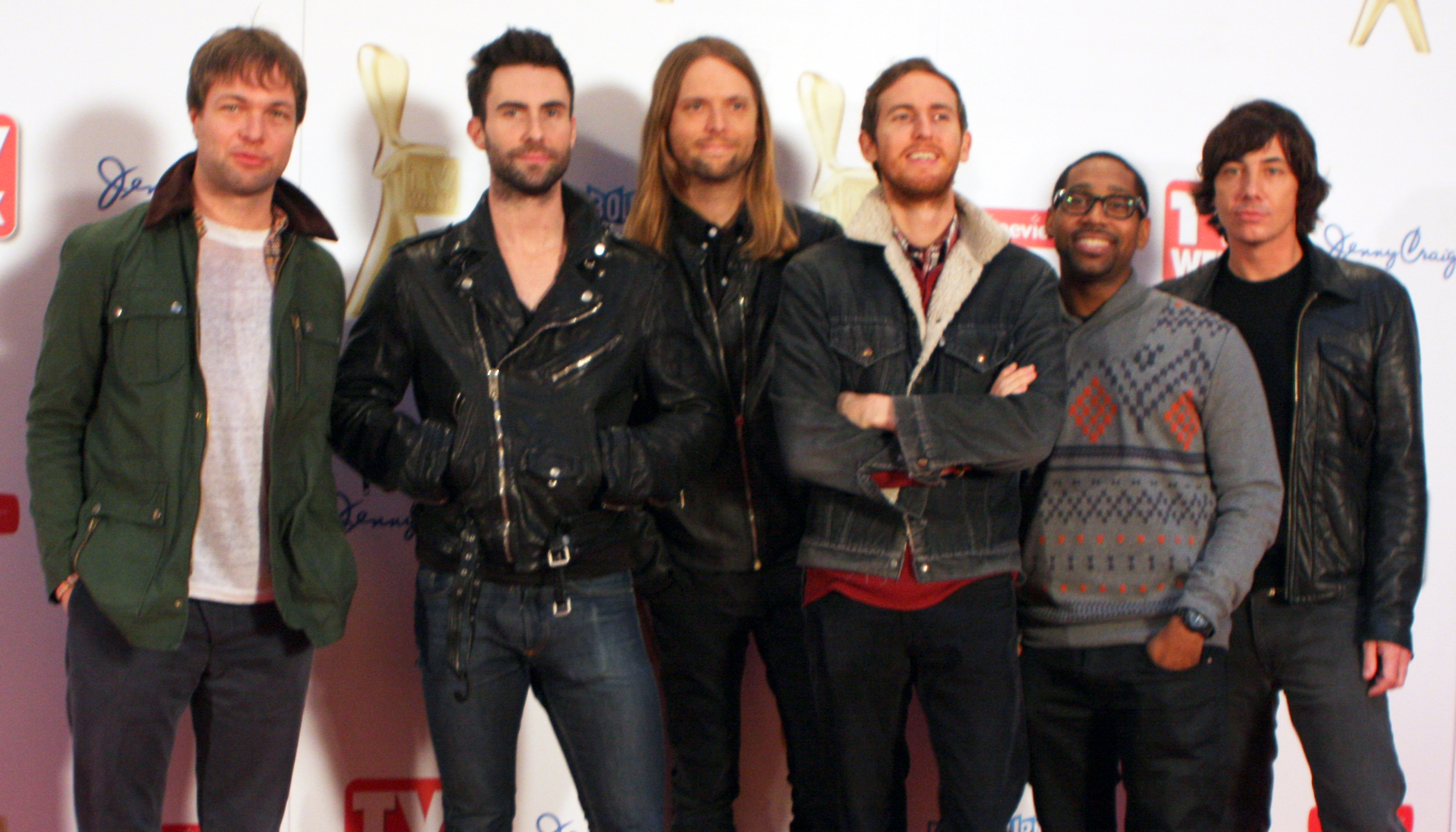
Maroon 5 were the first act and the first group to also win the respective category at the MTV Video Music Awards in the same year.

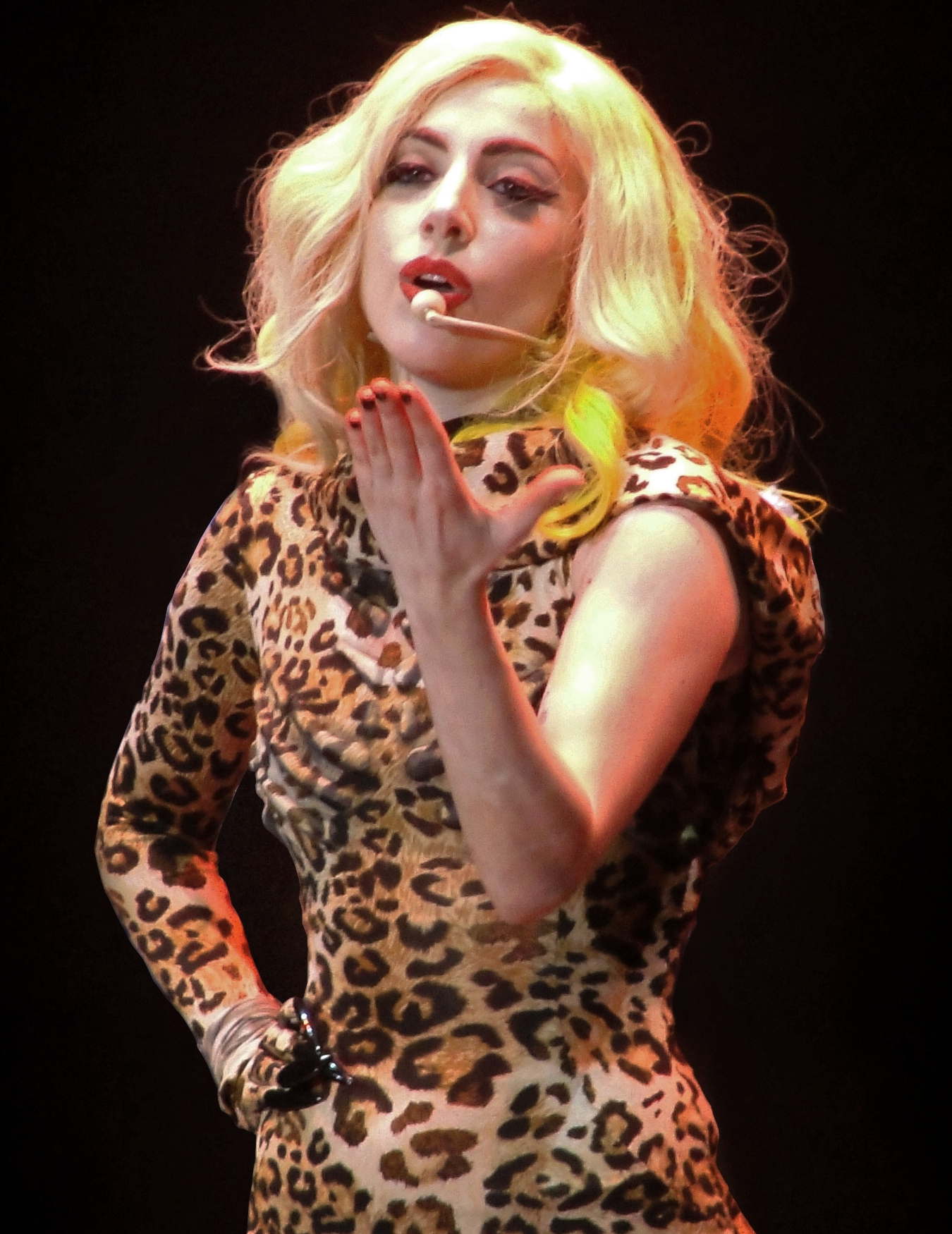
Lady Gaga was the first solo act to also win the respective category at the MTV Video Music Awards in the same year.

Year	Artist	Ref
2000
2000	**Blink 182**	
2000	Anastacia	
2000	Bomfunk MCs	
2000	Melanie C	
2000	Sonique	
2001
2001	**Dido**	
2001	Craig David	
2001	Nelly Furtado	
2001	Gorillaz	
2001	The Wheatus	
2002
2002	**The Calling**	
2002	Avril Lavigne †	
2002	Röyksopp	
2002	Shakira	
2002	The Strokes	
2003
2003	**Sean Paul ‡**	
2003	50 Cent †	
2003	Evanescence	
2003	Good Charlotte	
2003	Justin Timberlake	
2004
2004	**Maroon 5 †**	
2004	Franz Ferdinand	
2004	Jamelia	
2004	Keane	
2004	The Rasmus	
2005
2005	**James Blunt ‡**	
2005	Akon	
2005	Kaiser Chiefs	
2005	Daniel Powter	
2005	Rihanna ‡	
2006
2006	**Gnarls Barkley**	
2007
2007	**Bedwetters**	
2007	Firma	
2007	Yakup	
2008
2008	**Katy Perry ‡**	
2008	Miley Cyrus ‡	
2008	Duffy	
2008	Jonas Brothers	
2008	OneRepublic	
2009
2009	**Lady Gaga †**	
2009	Daniel Merriweather	
2009	La Roux	
2009	Pixie Lott	
2009	Taylor Swift	

=== 2010s ===
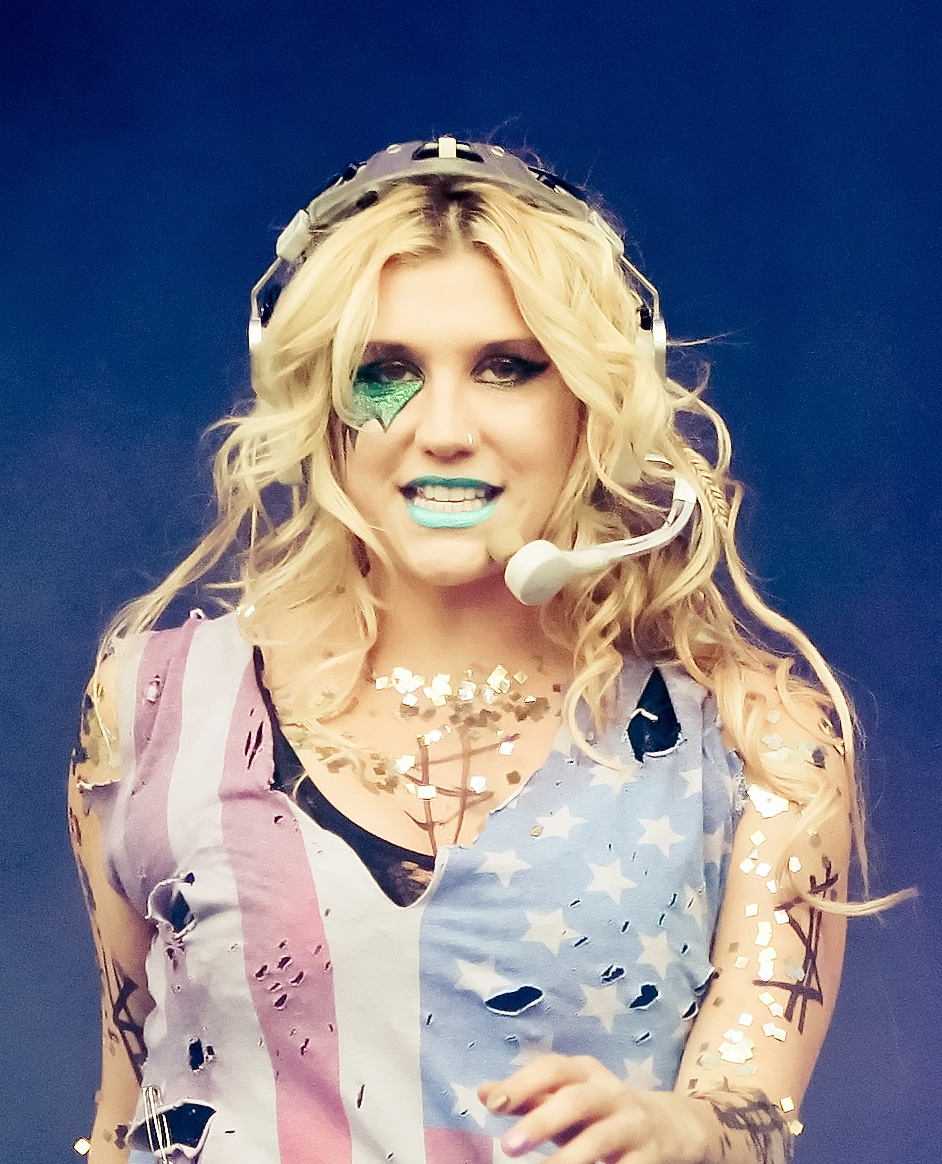
2010 award winner Kesha.

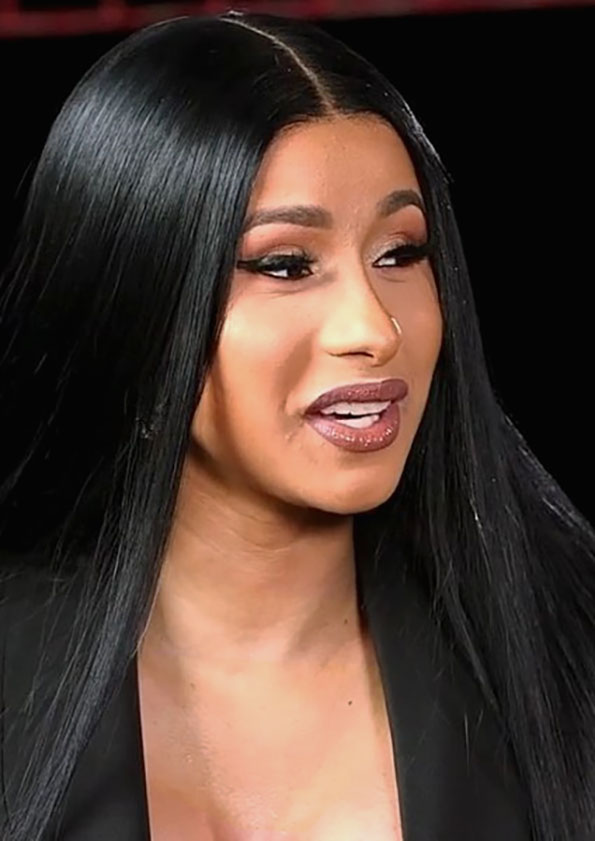
Cardi B was the first rapper to also win the respective category at the MTV Video Music Awards in the same year.

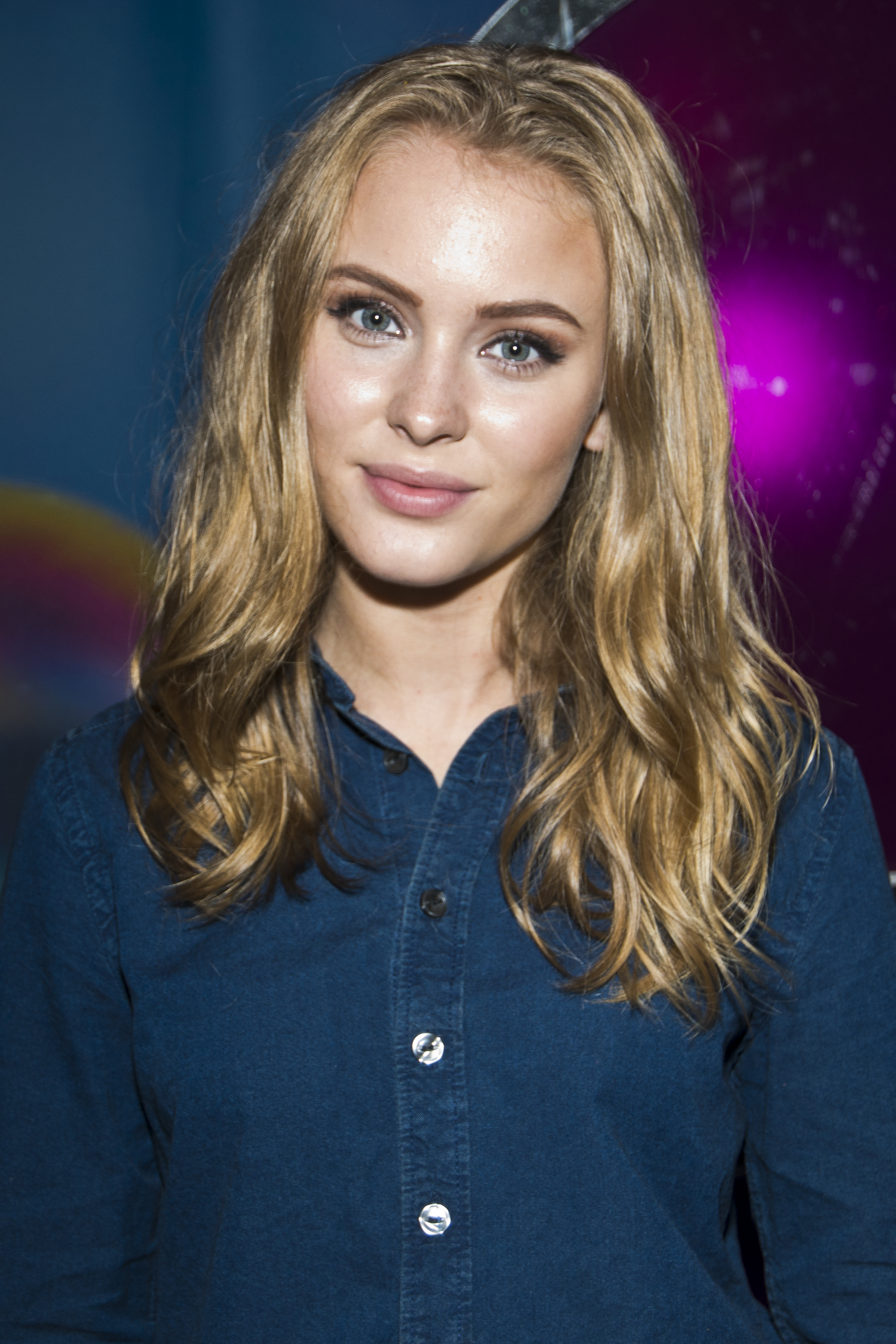
Zara Larsson was the first Swedish singer to win the category.

Year	Artist	Ref
2010
2010	**Kesha ‡**	
2010	B.o.B	
2010	Justin Bieber †	
2010	Jason Derulo ‡	
2010	Plan B	
2011
2011	**Bruno Mars**	
2011	Far East Movement	
2011	Jessie J	
2011	Wiz Khalifa ‡	
2011	LMFAO	
2012
2012	**One Direction †**	
2012	Carly Rae Jepsen ‡	
2012	Fun	
2012	Lana Del Rey	
2012	Rita Ora	
2013
2013	**Macklemore & Ryan Lewis**	
2013	Bastille	
2013	Icona Pop	
2013	Imagine Dragons	
2013	Rudimental	
2014
2014	**5 Seconds of Summer**	
2014	Charli XCX ‡	
2014	Ariana Grande	
2014	Kiesza	
2014	Sam Smith ‡	
2015
2015	**Shawn Mendes**	
2015	Tori Kelly	
2015	Jess Glynne	
2015	James Bay ‡	
2015	Echosmith	
2016
2016	**Zara Larsson** ‡	
2016	Bebe Rexha	
2016	DNCE †	
2016	Lukas Graham ‡	
2016	The Chainsmokers	
2017
2017	**Dua Lipa**	
2017	Julia Michaels ‡	
2017	Khalid †	
2017	Kyle ‡	
2017	Rag'n'Bone Man	
2018
2018	**Cardi B** †	
2018	Bazzi ‡	
2018	Anne-Marie	
2018	Hayley Kiyoko ‡	
2018	Jessie Reyez	
2019
2019	**Billie Eilish** †	
2019	Ava Max ‡	
2019	Lewis Capaldi	
2019	Lil Nas X ‡	
2019	Lizzo ‡	
2019	Mabel	

=== 2020s ===
Year	Artist	Ref
2020
2020	**Doja Cat** †	
2020	Benee ‡	
2020	DaBaby	
2020	Jack Harlow ‡	
2020	Roddy Ricch ‡	
2020	Yungblud ‡	
2021
2021	**Saweetie** ‡	
2021	Giveon ‡	
2021	Griff	
2021	Olivia Rodrigo †	
2021	Rauw Alejandro	
2021	the Kid Laroi ‡	
2022
2022	**Seventeen** ‡	
2022	Baby Keem ‡	
2022	Dove Cameron †	
2022	Gayle ‡	
2022	Stephen Sanchez	
2022	Tems	
2023
2023	**Peso Pluma** ‡	
2023	Coi Leray	
2023	Flo	
2023	Ice Spice †	
2023	PinkPantheress ‡	
2023	Reneé Rapp ‡	
2024
2024	**Benson Boone ‡**	
2024	Ayra Starr	
2024	Chappell Roan †	
2024	Le Sserafim	
2024	Teddy Swims ‡	
2024	The Last Dinner Party	
2024	Tyla ‡	

== See also ==
- MTV Europe Music Award for Best Push Act
- MTV Video Music Award for Best New Artist
