= Hey! Douglas =

Turkish funk band

- Born: Emin Yasin Vural; 17 November 1984 (age 41); Ankara, Turkey
- Origin: Ankara, Turkey
- Genres: Funk; Psychedelic rock; Anatolian rock
- Years active: 2015-
- Labels: Kamp Records; Basemode Records; EMI - Kent
- Website: www.veyasin.com/HeyDouglas heydouglas.com

Emin Yasin Vural (born November 17, 1984, Ankara), best known by his stage names Hey! Douglas or VEYasin, is a Istanbul-based DJ and sound artist.

== Career ==
VEYasin produced his first album at 18 and has produced many more inside and outside Turkey. In this project he recreates and remixes 1970s psychedelic, funk and soul songs from Anatolia and other Turkish regions.

1970s popular music of Turkey fused East and West. Rock and pop groups combined Eastern and Western instruments for the first time. VEYasin discovered this "old hip music" and "polishes it with today's technology".

A YouTube channel is one outlet for his tracks, with plays surpassing 3.9 million for one track, Ölem Ben (February 2022). Other projects include Mode XL, with some of those tracks attracting over 7.7 million YouTube views (February 2019). Popular tracks include "Duruyor Dünya", featuring Göksel.

== Selected discography ==
=== Albums ===
- Marşandiz (2019)

=== Compilation albums ===
- Murder At The Disco Down (2014)
- Seçmece 1 (2015)

=== EP's ===
- Yakın (2017)
- Devran, Pt. 1 (2025)

=== Singles ===
- İstiklal Re-Edit (2015, with Red Bull Music Academy)
- Pişman Değilim (2017, with Mine Koşan)
- Duruyor Dünya (2018, with Göksel)
- Deterjan (2019, with Can Gox)
- Ayva Çiçek Açmış (2019, with Gaye Su Akyol)
- Leylim Leylim (2019, with Fikret Kızılok)
- Bim Bam Bom (2019)
- Dansa Davet (2022)
- Koma Baby (2023)
- Bosstan (2023)
- Sarıl Bana (2023, with Melike Şahin)
- Divine (2023)
- Davşan (2023)
- Tomurcuk (2023)
- Subber (2023)
- Hasat (2023)
- Maden (2023)
- Uzaylılar Hoş Geldiniz (Hey! Douglas Version) (2024, with Ediz Hafızoğlu & Nazdrive)
- Kalbin Yok Mu? (2024, with Feridun Düzağaç)
- Kesik Çayır (2025)
- Uzun İnce Bir Yoldayım (2025)

== Award ==
- 2020: 46th Golden Butterfly Awards – "Best DJ"
