= Şehr-i Hüzün =

Studio album by Manga
- Released: 15 April 2009
- Genre: Nu metal; rap rock; electronic rock; progressive rock
- Label: Sony

Manga chronology
Manga (2004)	Şehr-i Hüzün (2009)	e-akustik (2012)

Şehr-i Hüzün (English: City of Sorrows) is the second album by Turkish rock band Manga. It was released by Sony BMG in April 2009.

The second video clip of the album was for the track "Leave Me With Me" on 27 July 2009. The third video clip was for "Cevapsız Sorular" on 16 November 2009.

A documentary, which tells the story of the band from its foundation to Şehr-i Hüzün, was included as the second disc in the first pressing of the album. The documentary is 150 minutes long and was directed and produced by Ferman Akgül. There is another edition of the album that does not include the documentary DVD and consists only of the CD.

The album was released on CD and LP (vinyl) format. Haluk Kuruosman was the music producer.

== Track listing ==
No.	Title	English translation	Length
1.	"Gün Doğumu"	Sunrise	1:54
2.	"Beni Benimle Bırak"	Leave Me With Myself	3:29
3.	"Dünyanın Sonuna Doğmuşum"	I Was Born at The End of The World	4:19
4.	"Cevapsız Sorular"	Unanswered Questions	4:31
5.	"Evdeki Ses"	Sound in the House	3:05
6.	"Her Aşk Ölümü Tadacak"	Every Love Will Taste Death	3:42
7.	"Şehr-i Hüzün"	City of Sorrows	1:03
8.	"Hayat Bu İşte"	This is Life	5:06
9.	"Üryan Geldim"	I Have Come Naked	4:40
10.	"Tek Yön Seçtiğim Tüm Yollar"	All Roads I Chose Are One Way	4:00
11.	"Gecenin Ritmi"	The Rhythm of The Night	1:26
12.	"Hepsi Bir Nefes"	It's All A Breath	4:42
13.	"Sessizlik Sona Erdi"	The Silence Is Over	2:59
14.	"Kaçamak Faslı"	Escapade Part	1:02
15.	"Alışırım Gözlerimi Kapamaya"	I’ll Get Used to Closing My Eyes	5:53
16.	"Gün Batımı"	Sunset	6:52

== Album information ==
The album initially placed at No. 36 on the Turkish charts, even though it was released just two days ahead of 2010. As of March 2010, Şehr-i Hüzün had made it into the top 10 in MTV Turkey, and enjoyed rising success on the MTV European charts.

Allmusic rated it 3,5 stars out of 5, saying that "this take on two pretty stale genres [nu metal and folk] is surprisingly fresh, if kitschy in its bombastic sensibility".
