= Manga (band) =

Turkish rock band

maNga
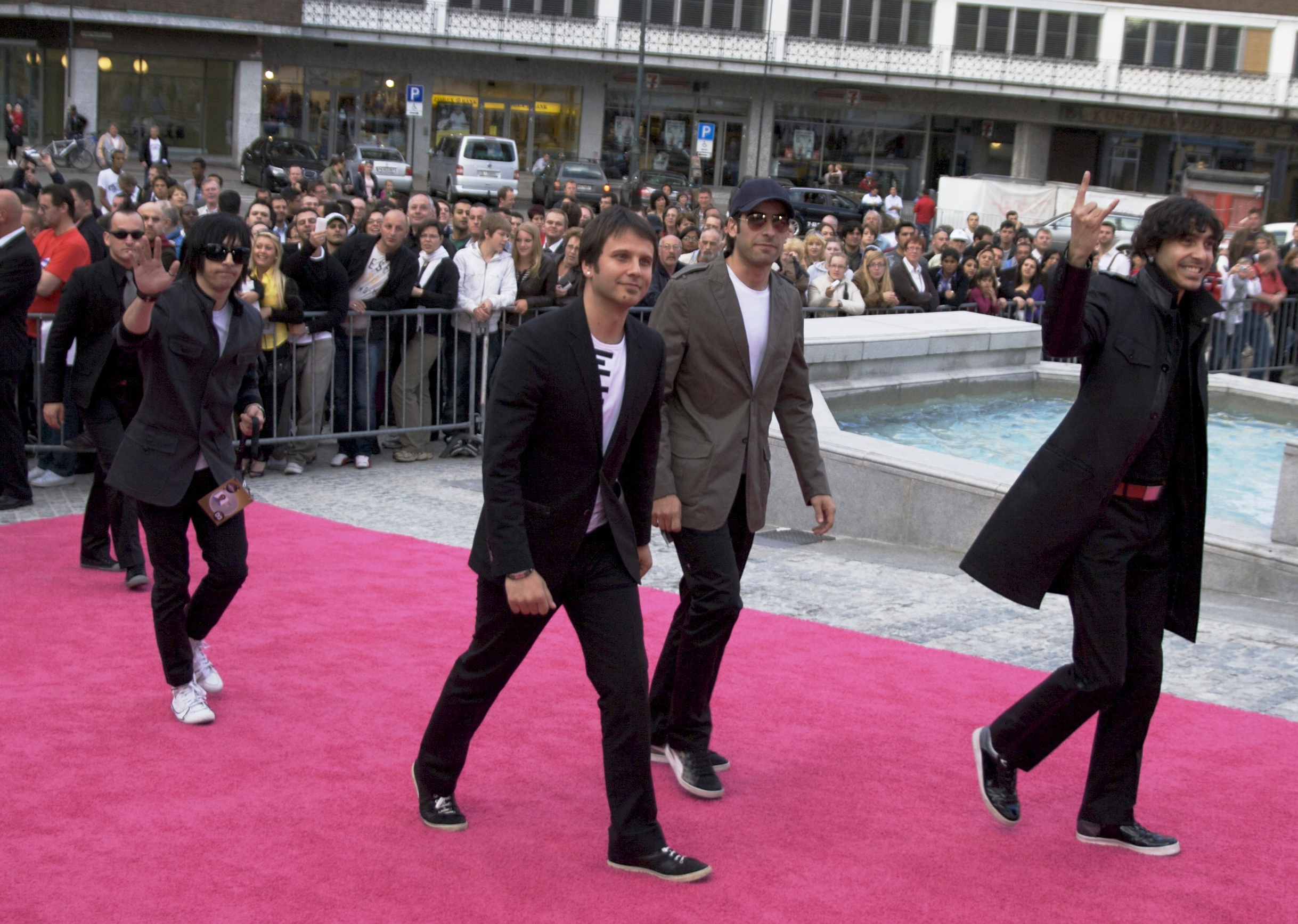
- maNga in Oslo

Background information
- Origin: Ankara, Turkey
- Genres: Alternative rock; alternative metal; nu metal; Anatolian rock
- Years active: 2001–present
- Labels: Poll Production, GRGDN, Sony Music Entertainment
- Members: Ferman Akgül (lead singer); Yağmur Sarıgül (guitarist); Cem Bahtiyar (bassist); Özgür Can Öney (drummer)
- Past members: Orçun Şekerusta (bassist, 2001-2002); Efe Yılmaz (DJ, 2001-2013)
- Website: www.manga.web.tr

Manga (stylised as maNga) is a Turkish rock band whose music is mainly a fusion of Anatolian melodies with electronic elements. In 2009, they won both the Best Turkish Act award from MTV Turkey and consequently the Best European Act award from MTV Networks Europe in MTV Europe Music Awards 2009. They represented Turkey at the Eurovision Song Contest 2010 with the song "We Could Be the Same" and took second place.

== History ==
maNga was formed in the year 2001. It was guitarist Yağmur Sarıgül's idea to name the band after Japanese comics. Initially, they were mostly underground, playing covers of other rock and metal bands. The band made the music for Aşık Veysel's poem "Kara Toprak", and later used a different poem by Göksel for the song "Dursun Zaman". They came into the public spotlight after finishing as runner-up at the Sing Your Song music contest. This caught the attention of artist manager Hadi Elazzi (GRGDN), who immediately promoted the band to Sony Music, which resulted in their first, self-titled album being published in 2004, becoming a hit. Following this, they performed at various music festivals and have worked with various famous Turkish singers as Koray Candemir (of Kargo fame), Vega and Göksel.

On 13 August 2006, maNga became the first Turkish rock band to take stage at the Sziget Festival, Budapest, Hungary. In 2006 they also had concerts in the Netherlands and Germany. Most of their songs are written by the group members. Sarıgül, the author of most of the songs, has described the band's genre as blending nu metal and hip hop with Anatolian melodies. maNga's duet with Göksel is included in one of the most successful (with almost a million viewers) Turkish films, Sınav (featuring Jean-Claude Van Damme). Their song Bir Kadın Çizeceksin was featured among the music of the FIFA 06 game. The band headlined several Turkish music festivals, including Saklıfest, Patlıcan, Rokofest and Rock'n Coke. The band was to take stage in the Wembley Stadium in London, together with Tarkan, but maNga did not perform due to technical difficulties on 13 April 2008. They also played in London's O2 Academy Islington on 4 December 2009. On 12 January 2010 the Turkish broadcaster TRT announced that maNga would be the Turkish representative at the Eurovision Song Contest 2010. They came second with 170 points, behind Germany.

== Members ==
=== Current members ===
- Ferman Akgül - vocals (2001–present), keyboards (2013-present)
- Yağmur Sarıgül - guitar (2001–present)
- Cem Bahtiyar - bass guitar (2002–present)
- Özgür Can Öney- drums (2001–present)

=== Former members ===
- Orçun Şekerusta - bass guitar (2001-2002)
- Efe Yılmaz - DJ, electronics (2001–2013)

== Discography ==
=== Albums ===
Title	Details	Sales	Certifications
Manga	Released: December 14, 2004; Label: Sony Music, GRGDN; Format: Digital download, CD	100,000+	Gold
Şehr-i Hüzün	Released: April 14, 2009; Label: Sony Music, GRGDN Music; Format: Digital download, CD		
e-akustik	Released: March 20, 2012; Label: PASAJ, GRGDN; Format: Digital download, CD		
Işıkları Söndürseler Bile	Released: April 14, 2014; Label: Poll Production; Format: Digital download, CD		
Antroposen 001	Released: December 14, 2021; Label: Manga Music; Format: Digital download		
Antroposen 002	Released: December 14, 2023; Label: Manga Music; Format: Digital download		

=== Extended plays ===
Title	Details
X	Released: April 27, 2018; Label: Poll Production; Format: Digital download

=== Singles ===
Title	Year	Peak chart positions					Album
Title	Year	TUR Rock	SWE	SWI	RUS	UK	Album
"Dünyanın Sonuna Doğmuşum"	2009	1	—	—	335	—	Şehr-i Hüzün
"Beni Benimle Bırak"	2009	1	—	—	—	—	Şehr-i Hüzün
"Cevapsız Sorular"	2009	2	—	—	—	—	Şehr-i Hüzün
"We Could Be the Same"	2010	1	29	56	—	129	E-akustik
"Fly to Stay Alive"	2010	2	—	—	—	—	E-akustik
"Fazla Aşkı Olan Var Mı?"	2014	—	—	—	—	—	Işıkları Söndürseler Bile
"Parti"	2014	—	—	—	—	—	Işıkları Söndürseler Bile
"Hint Kumaşı"	2015	—	—	—	—	—	Işıkları Söndürseler Bile
"Işıkları Söndürseler Bile"	2015	—	—	—	—	—	Işıkları Söndürseler Bile
Kendi Yolundan Şaşma	2015	—	—	—	—	—	Non-album single
"Yad Eller"	2018	—	—	—	—	—	X
"Süper Güçlerimiz Var"	2019	—	—	—	—	—	Non-album single
"Zor"	2020	—	—	—	—	—	Non-album single
"Bize Her Yer Stat"	2021	—	—	—	—	—	Non-album single
"Kırıla Kırıla"	2021	—	—	—	—	—	Non-album single
"Uzun İnce Bir Yoldayım"	2023	—	—	—	—	—	Non-album single
"—" denotes a single that did not chart or was not released.

=== Other appearances ===
Title	Year	Album(s)	Artist
"Raptiye Rap Rap"	2005	Mutlaka Yavrum	Cem Karaca
"Dursun Zaman"	2006	Sınav Soundtrack	—N/a
"Beni Unutma"	2011	İyilik&Güzellik Spor	Feridun Düzağaç
"Fly To Stay Alive"	2011	Anadolu Kartalları Soundtrack	—N/a
"Tek Yön Seçtiğin Tüm Yollar"	2011	Anadolu Kartalları Soundtrack	—N/a
"Yine Yeni Yeniden Sev"	2015	Hadi İnşallah Soundtrack	—N/a
"Haykıracak Nefesim Kalmasa Bile"	2019	Fikret Şeneş Şarkıları	Fikret Şeneş
"Para Parra Parrra"	2020	Baba Parası Soundtrack	—N/a

== Awards and nominations ==
Year	Award	Category	Work	Result	Ref.
2005	POPSAV Ödülleri	Best rock band		Nominated	
2005	POPSAV Ödülleri	Best video		Nominated	
2005	Hürriyet Altın Kelebek Ödülleri (Golden Butterfly Awards)	Best Newcomer Band		Nominated	
2006	MÜYAP Ödülleri	Gold Disc	maNga	Won	
2009	MTV Turkey	Best Turkish Act		Nominated	
2009	MTV Europe Music Awards	Best Turkish Act		Won	
2009	MTV Europe Music Awards	Best European Act		Won	
2010	Eurovision Song Contest		"We Could Be the Same"	2nd	
2011	Balkan Music Awards	Best Duet/Group In The Balkans		Nominated	
2012	Balkan Music Awards	Best Group In The Balkans		Nominated	

== See also ==
- Turkish rock
- Rock'n Coke
- Manga

Awards and achievements
Preceded by (Turkey) Emre Aydın	Best European Act in the MTV Europe Music Awards; 2009	Succeeded by (Italy) Marco Mengoni
Preceded by Hadise with Düm Tek Tek	Turkey in the Eurovision Song Contest; 2010	Succeeded by Yüksek Sadakat with Live It Up
Preceded by (Romania) Akcent	Best Group in the Balkans; 2010, 2012	Succeeded by
