= E-akustik =

e-akustik

Studio album by maNga
- Released: March 20, 2012
- Genre: Electroacoustic, rap rock
- Label: PASAJ/GRGDN

MaNga chronology
Şehr-i Hüzün (2009)	e-akustik (2012)	Işıkları Söndürseler Bile (2014)

e-akustik is the third album by Turkish rock group maNga. It was released by Pasaj/GRGDN in March 2012. Many of the songs are electroacoustic adaptations of the band's earlier works.

== Track listing ==
No.	Title	English translation	Length
1.	"Hoş Geldin"	Welcome
2.	"Rezalet Çıkarasım Var"	I Want To Make A Scandal
3.	"Hayat Bu Işte"	This is Life
4.	"Her Aşk Ölümü Tadacak"	Every Love Will Taste Death
5.	"Beni Benimle Bırak"	Leave Me With Myself
6.	"We Could Be The Same"	-
7.	"Bir Kadın Çizeceksin"	You'll Draw A Woman
8.	"Lunapark"	Funfair
9.	"Ben Bir Palyaçoyum"	I Am A Clown
10.	"Dursun Zaman"	Let The Time Stop
11.	"Fly To Stay Alive"	-
12.	"Yalan"	The Lie
13.	"Cevapsız Sorular"	Unanswered Questions
14.	"Güle Güle"	Goodbye
