= Yağmur Sarıgül =

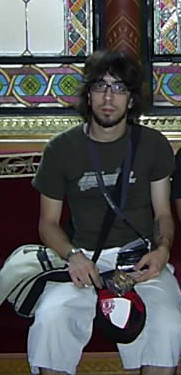

Background information
- Born: 26 August 1979 (age 45); Antalya, Turkey
- Genres: Alternative rock, rapcore, nu metal
- Occupation(s): Songwriter, musician
- Instrument(s): Piano, guitar, violin
- Years active: 2002–present
- Labels: Sony Music, GRGDN
- Website: manga.web.tr

Yağmur Sarıgül (Turkish pronunciation: [jaːˈmuɾ saɾɯˈɟyl]; born 26 August 1979) is a Turkish songwriter and the electric guitarist of the rock band maNga. He writes both lyrics and music.

Yağmur "Yamyam" Sarıgül was born in Antalya, Turkey on 26 August 1979 but grew up and discovered music in Ankara. Hailing from a musical family (father plays ney, mother plays oud) Sarıgül was accepted into Hacettepe University State Conservatory at the age of 10 for both classical dance and music. He chose music.

After studies in violin through Bilkent University Stage Arts Faculty and continued education in piano and guitar through the conservatory, Sarıgül applied to Ankara Anatolian Arts High School.

After graduation, Sarıgül applied and was accepted to the Gazi University music program. During these years he played with Ankara bands "Laterna" and "6/8" then eventually envisioned, founded and created his most successful band "maNga" in 2001. He was awarded the "Best Musician" title at "Sing Your Song" music contest in 2001 where maNga finished second. The band went on to create two hit albums. Sarıgül's band was awarded "Europe's Favourite Act" at the MTV EMA's 2009 in Berlin, Germany and won second at the Eurovision Song Contest 2010 in Oslo, Norway for their hit song "We Could Be the Same"; produced by Sarıgül.

Sarıgül was assistant producer for maNga's debut album maNga and second album Şehr-i Hüzün. He is the sole producer for maNga's new acoustic album project. During concerts he uses seven string guitars and keyboards.

== Compositions ==
=== Own songs ===
maNga album

- Açılış
- Kal Yanımda
- Yalan
- Libido
- Yalan 2
- maNgara
- Kapanış
- Kandırma Kendini
- Üryan Geldim
- Alışırım Gözlerimi Kapamaya
- En Güzel Şarkım
- Yarın Doğar Güneş Elbet Yine

=== Co-written songs ===
- Bitti Rüya
  - Music: with Ferman Akgül
  - Lyrics: with Ferman Akgül, Özgür Can Öney, Haluk Kurosman
- Dursun Zaman
  - Music: with maNga
- İtildik
  - Lyrics: Ferman Akgül
  - Music: with Ferman Akgül
- Kapkaç
  - Lyrics: with Ferman Akgül
- Sakın Bana Söyleme
  - Lyrics: with Ferman Akgül
- Ben Bir Palyaçoyum

=== Cover songs ===
Yağmur also covered other artists' songs re-arranging the music.

- "İz Bırakanlar Unutulmaz" in album maNga; original by Vega
- "Raptiye Rap Rap", in the memory album Mutlaka Yavrum of Cem Karaca
- "Beni Benimle Bırak"

Preceded by Hadise with Düm Tek Tek	Turkey in the Eurovision Song Contest; 2010 (as part of maNga)	Succeeded by Yüksek Sadakat with Live It Up
