= Evren Ozdemir =

- Birth name: Evren Özdemir
- Born: November 10, 1977 (age 47)
- Origin: Istanbul, Turkey
- Genres: Hip hop, pop
- Occupation(s): Rapper, producer, songwriter
- Years active: 2002–present
- Labels: EVRENMUSIC
- Website: evrenmusic.com

Evren Ozdemir (born November 10, 1977, in Istanbul, Turkey) also known by his stage name EVREN, is a Canadian rapper, producer, and songwriter. Writing music since the early age of 13, Evren began to capture the interest of various industry professionals, leading to his involvement in writing material for hit television series including Degrassi: The Next Generation, Instant Star, Billable Hours, and The Best Years. As well as licensing material for TV shows, Evren began composing songs for national advertising campaigns including Toyota, Telus, and Rogers. In 2002 Evren won the ISC People's Voice Online Voting Award for co-writing the Degrassi: The Next Generation theme song, "Whatever It Takes". He has also worked on spots for Artists Against Racism , as well as voice work for Kelloggs, Nike, and McDonald's, among others.

Despite his involvement in the TV and advertising world, Evren's primary focus drew him towards working on longer format projects for various artists and singers, including his own records, Conflict of Interest (2002), Unknown MC (2004), I Think Not (2008) and his latest up and coming release, A Little Bit of Love (2010).

After years of working on both independent productions, as well as higher profile campaigns, Evren’s work as a songwriter came to fruition when he wrote the hit song "We Could Be The Same" for Turkish mega band, maNga, which went on to place 2nd in the international European song contest Eurovision in 2010.
