= We Could Be the Same =

2010 song by maNga

Single by maNga
- Released: 3 March 2010 (digital download); 20 May 2010 (CD single)
- Recorded: 2010
- Genre: Industrial rock; alternative rock
- Length: 3:01
- Label: Sony Music Entertainment
- Songwriters: maNga; Evren Özdemir; Fiona Movery Akinci

MaNga singles chronology
"Cevapsız Sorular" (2009)	"We Could Be the Same" (2010)	"Fly to Stay Alive" (2010)

Eurovision Song Contest 2010 entry
- Country: Turkey
- Artist: maNga
- Language: English
- Composers: Yağmur Sarıgül; Ferman Akgül; Özgür Can Öney; Efe Yılmaz; Cem Bahtiyar
- Lyricists: Evren Özdemir; Yağmur Sarıgül; Ferman Akgül; Fiona Movery Akinci

Finals performance
- Semi-final result: 1st
- Semi-final points: 118
- Final result: 2nd
- Final points: 170

Entry chronology
- ◄ "Düm Tek Tek" (2009)
- "Live It Up" (2011) ►

Official performance video
- "We Could Be the Same" on YouTube

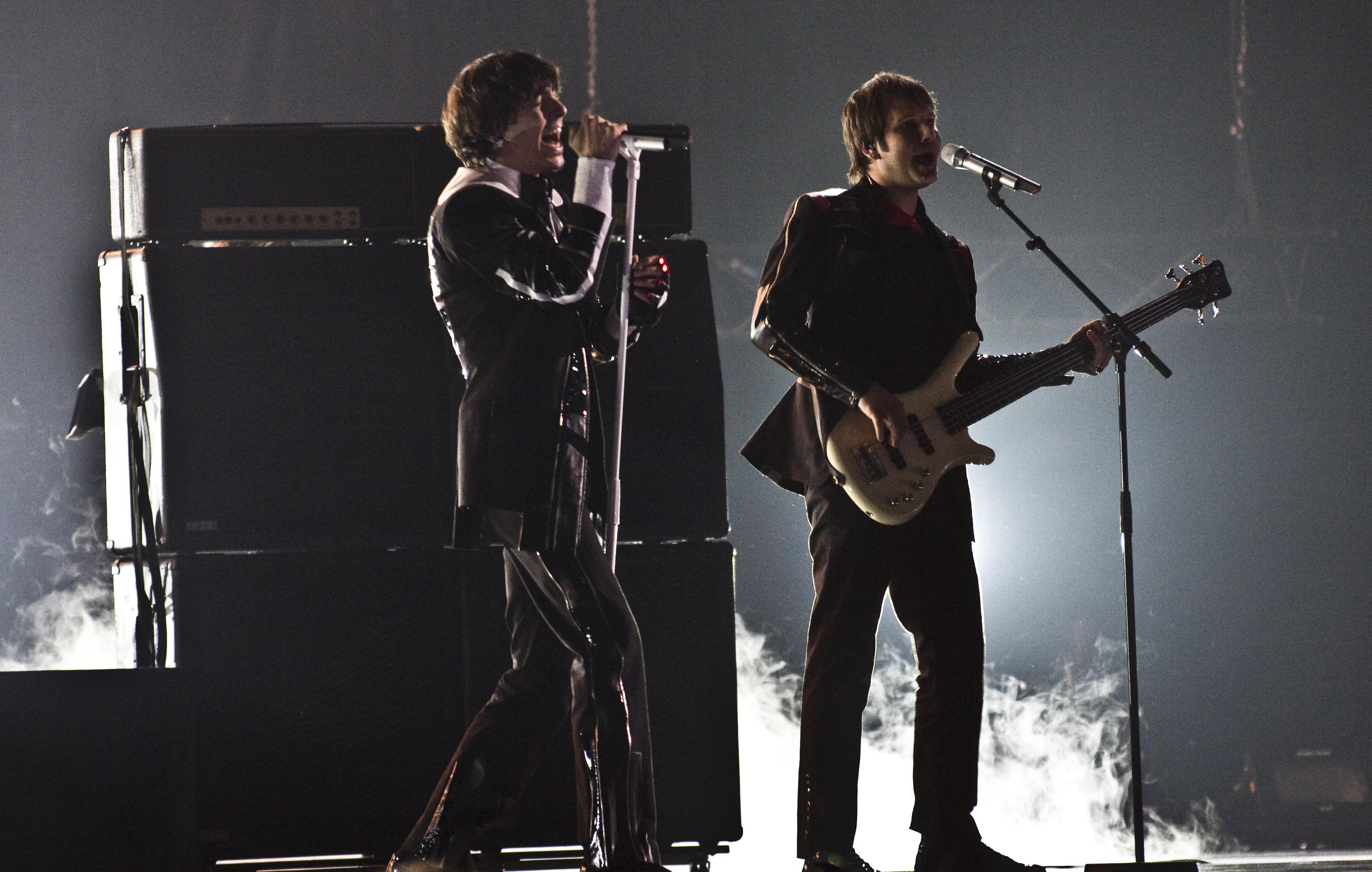
maNga in the Eurovision Song Contest 2010

"We Could Be the Same" (Turkish: Aynı Olabiliriz) is a song by Turkish band maNga. It represented Turkey in the Eurovision Song Contest 2010 held in Oslo, placing second.

There are 3 versions available on official CD single, called as Brussels (Eurovision version), Istanbul (Single version), and Stockholm (Extended version).

== Selection ==
On 7 January 2010, Türkiye Radyo ve Televizyon Kurumu (TRT) announced that it had internally selected maNga as its representatives in the Eurovision Song Contest 2010. In February 2010, maNga submitted three songs to TRT, all of them in English. TRT announced "We Could Be the Same" as the selected song on 3 March.

== Music video ==
The music video for the song was filmed on the Bosphorus Strait opposite the Golden Horn on board an oil tanker. Then unknown top model Zeynep Arı appears in the video.

== Charts ==
Chart (2010)	Peak position
Sweden (Sverigetopplistan)	29
Switzerland (Schweizer Hitparade)	56
Turkey (Türkiye Single Top 100)	1
United Kingdom (UK Singles Chart)	129

== See also ==
- Turkey in the Eurovision Song Contest 2010
