= Yüksek Sadakat =

Turkish rock band

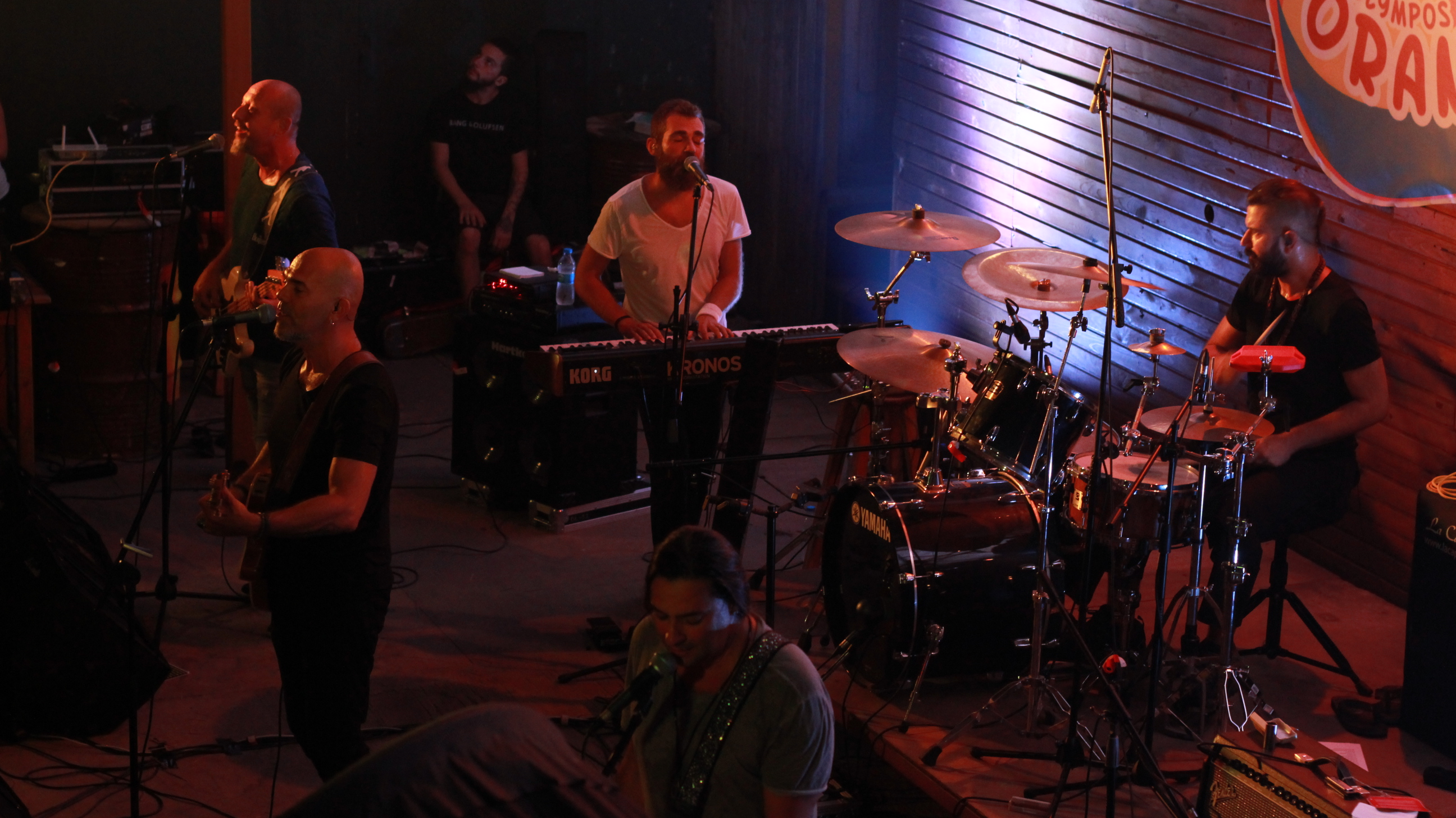
- Performing live in summer 2018

Background information
- Origin: Istanbul, Turkey
- Genres: Rock
- Years active: 1997–present
- Label: DMC Music
- Members: Kenan Vural (vocals); Serkan Özgen (guitar); Kutlu Özmakinacı (bass); Uğur Onatkut (keyboard); Deniz Alemdar (drums)
- Past members: Cemil Demirbakan (vocals); Alpay Şalt (drums); Selçuk Sami Cingi (vocal)
- Website: yukseksadakat.com

Yüksek Sadakat is a Turkish rock band that was formed in 1997 by Kutlu Özmakinacı, but became popular in early 2006 with their first album with the same name. The founder and bass player Kutlu Özmakinacı, used to be the editor of a music magazine called Blue Jean. Their music is a mix of pop rock with powerful beats utilizing Turkish instruments, keyboard and guitar solos. The name of the band is a literal translation of the term High Fidelity (Hi-Fi) into Turkish.

First established with the name Filinta, the band changed its name to Yüksek Sadakat in 2004. The founder and the songwriter of the band is the bassist Kutlu Özmakinacı.

On January 1, 2011, it was announced that the band will represent Turkey in Eurovision Song Contest 2011 with the song called "Live It Up", On May 10, Yüksek Sadakat failed to qualify for the Eurovision final making the band the first Turkish act to miss the final since the introduction of the semifinals in 2004.

== Members ==
- Serkan Özgen – guitar
- Kutlu Özmakinacı – bass
- Uğur Onatkut – keyboards
- Deniz Alemdar – drums

== Past members ==
- Selçuk Sami Cingi – vocal
- Cemil Demirbakan – vocal
- Kenan Vural – vocal
- Alpay Şalt – drums

== Albums ==
- Yüksek Sadakat (2006)
- Katil & Maktûl (2008)
- Renk Körü (2011)
- IV (2014)
- Rengarenk (2021)

== Music videos ==
- Belki Üstümüzden Bir Kuş Geçer (2005)
- Kafile (2005)
- Aklımın İplerini Saldım (2005)
- Ask Durducka (2008)
- Haydi gel icelim (2009)
- Sana Aşık Yalnız Ben (2011)
- Live It Up (2011)
- Fener (2013)

Awards and achievements
Preceded by maNga with We Could Be the Same	Turkey in the Eurovision Song Contest; 2011	Succeeded by Can Bonomo with Love Me Back
