= Işıkları Söndürseler Bile =

Studio album by maNga
- Released: April 14, 2014
- Genre: Alternative rock
- Length: 44:54
- Label: Poll Production

MaNga chronology
e-akustik (2012)	Işıkları Söndürseler Bile (2014)	Antroposen 001 (2021)

Singles from Işıkları Söndürseler Bile
- 1. "Fazla Aşkı Olan Var Mı?" Released: April 7, 2014

Işıkları Söndürseler Bile (English: Even If They Put Out the Lights) is the fourth album by Turkish rock band maNga. It was released by Poll Production in April 2014.

== Track listing ==
No.	Title	English translation	Length
1.	"Dem"	Breath	1:35
2.	"Fazla Aşkı Olan Var Mı?"	Does Anyone Have Spare Love?	3:38
3.	"Parti"	Party	4:14
4.	"Hint Kumaşı"	Cat's Whiskers	4:43
5.	"Bize Müsaade Ettim" (feat. Kenan Doğulu)	I Allowed Us	3:52
6.	"Bir Varmış Bir Yokmuş"	Now You Have It, Now You Don't	2:59
7.	"Işıkları Söndürseler Bile"	Even If They Put Out the Lights	4:29
8.	"En Güzel Şarkım"	My Most Beautiful Song	3:58
9.	"Gözünü Aç Çocuk"	Open Your Eyes, Child	3:21
10.	"Romantik Şizofren"	Romantic Schizophrenic	4:53
11.	"Eriyorum Nihayete"	I'm Coming to an End	3:37
12.	"Yaranmaz Aşık"	Uningratiating Lover	3:35

Notes

1. Idiomatic.
2. Translated according to the meaning given in the song.
