= MTV Europe Music Award for Best Urban =

Category of MTV Europe Music Awards

The MTV Europe Music Award for Best Urban was given out between 2007 and 2009. It has since been retired.

== Winners and nominees ==
Winners are listed first and highlighted in bold.

=== 2000s ===
Year	Artist	Ref
2007
2007	**Rihanna**	
2007	Beyoncé	
2007	Gym Class Heroes	
2007	Timbaland	
2007	Justin Timberlake	
2007	Kanye West	
2008
2008	**Kanye West**	
2008	Beyoncé	
2008	Chris Brown	
2008	Alicia Keys	
2008	Lil Wayne	
2009
2009	**Jay Z**	
2009	Ciara	
2009	Eminem	
2009	Kanye West	
2009	T.I.	
