= Manga (album) =

Studio album by Manga
- Released: December 14, 2004
- Recorded: GRGDN - ULUS
- Genre: Nu metal, rap rock, alternative rock
- Length: 55:42
- Label: Sony Music/GRGDN
- Producer: Haluk Kurosman, Yağmur Sarıgül

Manga chronology
Manga (2004)	Manga+ (2006)

Manga is the self-titled album of Turkish rock band Manga, released in December 2004 by Sony Music/GRGDN. It was reissued in 2006, with two additional tracks and a bonus DVD. The album sold 180,000 copies and earned a gold certification. The album earned the band the Golden Butterfly Awards as Best Newcomer.

== Track listing ==
1. Açılış (Intro) – 1:18
2. Kapkaç (Snatching) – 2:51
3. Bitti Rüya (The Dream Is Over) – 3:59
4. Bir Kadın Çizeceksin (You'll Draw a Woman) – 3:59
5. Kal Yanımda (Stay Beside Me) (Vocal: Koray Candemir) – 3:45
6. Yalan (The Lie) – 5:27
7. Libido – 3:02
8. İz Bırakanlar Unutulmaz (Impressors Aren't Forgotten) (Vocal: Vega) – 4:10
9. Sakın Bana Söyleme (Don't You Tell Me Ever) – 4:39
10. Dursun Zaman (Let the Time Stop) (Vocal: Göksel) – 4:50
11. Mangara – 2:27
12. İtildik (We've Been Pushed Away) – 3:25
13. Yalan 2 (The Lie #2) (Vocal: Koray Candemir) – 3:57
14. Kapanış (Closure) – 1:07
- Hidden track: "Kal Yanımda 2" featuring Unknown MC after "Kapanış".

=== Reissue (maNga+) ===
1. Açılış (Intro) – 1:18
2. Kandırma Kendini (Don't Fool Yourself) - 3:59
3. Raptiye Rap Rap - 4:14
4. Kapkaç (Snatching) – 2:51
5. Bitti Rüya (The Dream is Over)(Guest vocal : Göksel Demirpençe) – 3:59
6. Bir Kadın Çizeceksin (You'll Draw a Woman) – 3:59
7. Kal Yanımda (Stay Beside Me)(Guest vocal: Koray Candemir) – 3:45
8. Yalan (The Lie) – 5:27
9. Libido (Libido) – 3:02
10. İz Bırakanlar Unutulmaz (Impressors Aren't Forgotten) (Guest vocal: Vega) – 4:10
11. Sakın Bana Söyleme (Don't you Tell Me) – 4:39
12. Dursun Zaman (Let the Time Stop) (Guest vocal: Göksel) – 4:50
13. Mangara – 2:27
14. İtildik (We've Been Pushed Away) – 3:25
15. Yalan 2 (The Lie #2) (Backing vocal: Koray Candemir) – 3:57
16. Kapanış (Closure) – 1:07
- Hidden track: "Kal Yanımda 2" featuring Evren Ozdemir after "Kapanış".

==== Extras ====
The album contains the audio cd with the above track listing, and a special DVD, containing the four music videos of the band with a specially designed manga-style DVD-menu:

- Bir Kadın Çizeceksin (director: Cynosure)
- Bitti Rüya (director: Devrin Usta)
- Dursun Zaman (director: Onur Uysal)
- Kandırma Kendini (director: Devrin Usta)

== Album information ==
=== Personnel ===
- Management: Hadi Elazzi, Selim Serezli
- Producer: Haluk Kurosman
- Assistant Producer: Yağmur Sarıgül
- Arrangement: Haluk Kurosman and maNga
- Studio: GRGDN - ULUS
- Editing, Mixing, Mastering: Haluk Kurosman
- Design:
  - Manga drawings: Kaan Demirçelik
  - Graphics: Emrah Gündüz, Gümrah Oymak, Atalay Açık
- Photography: Şafak Taner

=== Featuring Musicians ===
- Keyboard, Underworks: Haluk Kurosman
- Vocal, Kal Yanımda and Yalan 2: Koray Candemir
- Vocal, İz Bırakanlar Unutulmaz: Deniz Özbey Akyüz (Vega)
- Vocal, Dursun Zaman: Göksel
- Vocal, Kal Yanımda 2: Unknown MC
- Ney in Açılış, Kapanış: Ali Sarıgül
- Piano in Yalan, İtildik: Özgür Sarı
- Sound Recording for Kapkaç, Yalan: Emel Çölgeçen

Bitti Rüya, Bir Kadın Çizeceksin, Sakın Bana Söyleme:

- Tülay Karşın: Violin
- Kerem Berkalp: Violin
- Göknil Özkök Genç: Viola
- Didem Erken: Cello

== Music videos ==
- Bir Kadın Çizeceksin
  - the song was included in the soundtrack of FIFA 06 video games by EA Sports.
- Bitti Rüya
- Dursun Zaman
  - The song is featured in the soundtrack of the film Sınav (The Exam) (featuring Jean-Claude Van Damme)
- Kandırma Kendini
  - The song was one of the two bonus songs of the re-release of the album, titled maNga+ .
- Yalan
