= Jamal (band) =

Polish band

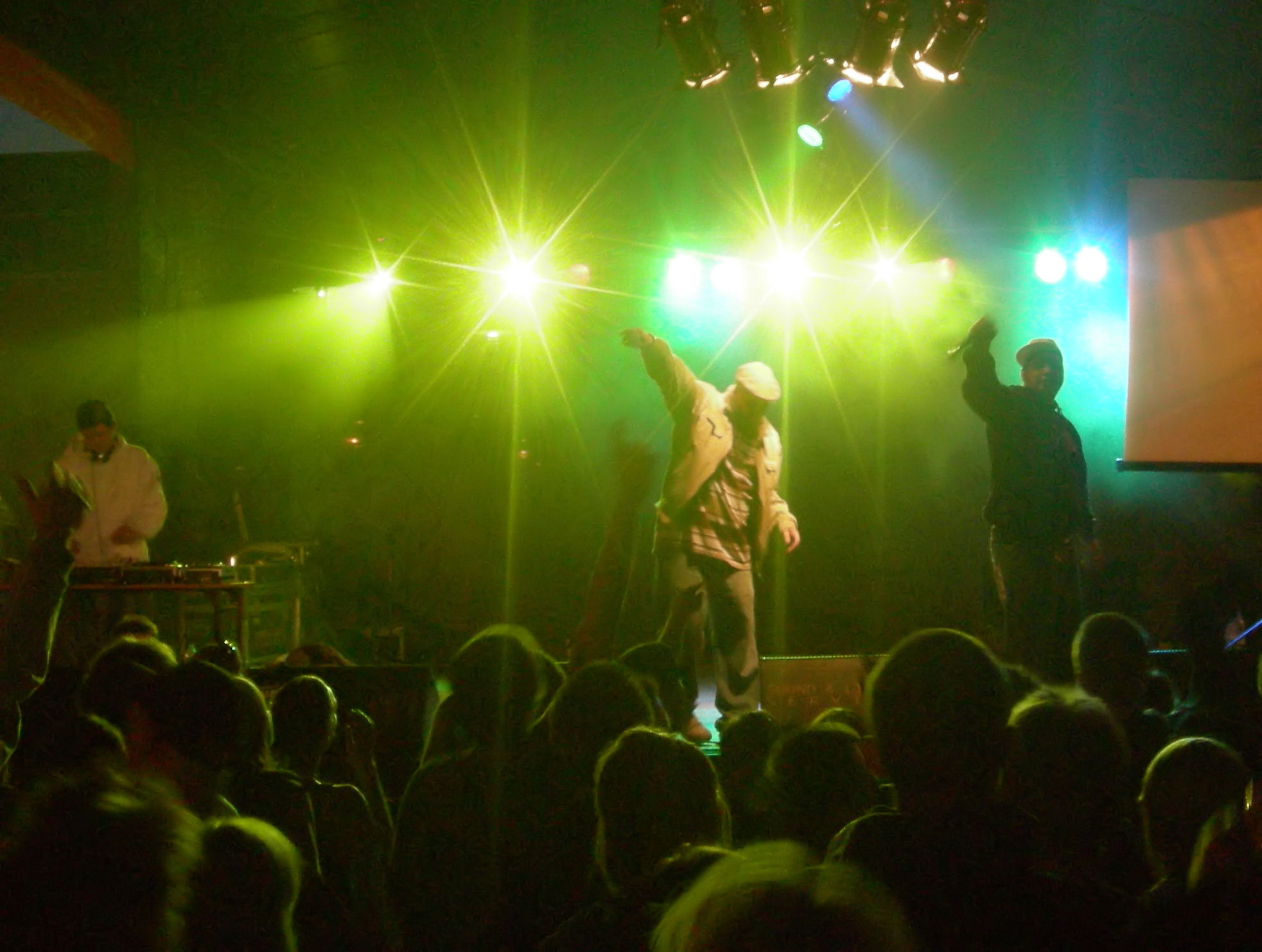
- Jamal performing in 2008

Background information
- Origin: Radom, Poland
- Genres: hip hop, raggamuffin, reggae, and dancehall
- Years active: 1999–2002 (duo); 2005–present (band)
- Label: EMI Music Poland
- Members: Tomasz Mioduszewski; Andrzej Markowski; Tomasz Księżopolski; Łukasz Wieczorek; Radek Ciurko; Bolek Wilczek
- Past members: Łukasz Borowiecki; Nicolas Ribier; Wojciech Łuczkiewicz; Bartek Głowacki
- Website: www.myspace.com/jamalreggae

Jamal is a Polish raggamuffin, reggae and dancehall music group from Radom. At various times, it included members Gienia, Księżyc, LUU, EMZK and Siekierka.

The group was founded in 1999 by Łukasz Borowiecki and Tomasz Mioduszewski. The duo started initially as a hip hop band and performed mainly in Polish. The band reformed in 2005 and on June 18 that year, they released a debut album Rewolucje on EMI, with a strong influence of reggae, dancehall and raggamuffin.

Their debut single from the album was "Tubaka" During the annual national Nagroda Muzyczna Fryderyk Awards (known for short as the Fryderyks), their album was nominated for "Best Hip Hop / R&B Album of the Year" in Poland. The band's vocalist Tomasz "Miodu" Mioduszewski credited as Miodu appeared in Molesta's 2006 music video for "Tak miało być" with the single featuring Jamal and charting in Polish Radio official chart Szczecińska Lista Przebojów (SLiP) reaching #31 in addition to hits Policeman (reaching #25) and "Rewolucje" (reaching #29).

Soon after, Frenchman joined from Bass Medium Trinity project working for the follow-up album that was released on October 3, 2008, called Urban Discotheque. Frenchman had contributed to the album rendering it was bilingual with some parts sung in French in addition to band singing in Polish.

The band has had a comeback in 2012 with the hit "Defto".

== Members ==
- Tomasz "Miodu" Mioduszewski – vocals
- Andrzej "Gienia" Markowski – bass guitar
- Tomasz "Księżyc" Księżopolski – guitar
- Łukasz Wieczorek – guitar
- Radek "Emzk" Ciurko – keyboards
- Bolek Wilczek – percussion

Former members

- Łukasz Borowiecki
- Nicolas "Frenchman" Ribier
- Wojciech "Woocheck" Łuczkiewicz
- Bartek "Głowa" Głowacki

== Discography ==
=== Studio albums ===
Title	Album details	Peak chart positions	Sales	Certifications
Title	Album details	POL	Sales	Certifications
Rewolucje	Released: June 20, 2005; Label: EMI Music Poland; Formats: CD, digital download	—		
Urban Discotheque	Released: October 6, 2008; Label: EMI Music Poland; Formats: CD, digital download	24		
Miłość	Released: October 8, 2013; Label: Parlophone Music Poland; Formats: CD, digital download	9	POL: 15,000+	POL: Gold
1994	Released: June 2, 2017; Label: Pomaton; Formats: CD, digital download	39		
"—" denotes a recording that did not chart or was not released in that territory.

=== Singles ===
Title	Year	Peak chart positions	Album
Title	Year	POL	Album
"Policeman"	2005	—	Rewolucje
"Pull Up"	2009	—	Urban Discotheque
"Słońca łan"	2009	—	Urban Discotheque
"Defto"	2012	—	Miłość
"Peron"	2013	2	Miłość
"Definicja" (OCN featuring: Jamal)	2014	—	non-album single
"Kim Gordon"	2017	—	1994
"Strzał"	2017	—	1994
"—" denotes a recording that did not chart or was not released in that territory.

=== Music videos ===
Year	Title	Directed	Album	Ref.
2005	"Policeman"	—	Rewolucje	
2005	"Tubaka"	—	Rewolucje	
2008	"Słońca łan"	—	Urban Discotheque	
2008	"Pójdę tylko tam"	—	Urban Discotheque	
2008	"Pull Up"	—	Urban Discotheque	
2012	"Defto"	Krzysztof Skonieczny	Miłość	
2013	"Peron"	Krzysztof Ostrowski	Miłość	
2014	"Upadłem w Poznaniu"	Krzysztof Ostrowski	Miłość	
2017	"Strzał"	Sasha Vouk	1994	
