= MTV Europe Music Award for Best European Act =

Category of MTV Europe Music Awards

The following is a list of the MTV Europe Music Award winners and nominees for Best European Act.

== 2000s ==
Year	Winner	Nominees	Eliminated
2007	Bedwetters ^{[a]}	Firma; Yakup	Sunrise Avenue; Christophe Willem; Jaula de Grillos; Buraka Som Sistema; Chakuza; Klaxons; Neverstore; Zero Assoluto; Delain; Dani; Gravel; Coma; Alphabeat; Aleksander With; Astro'n'out
2008	Emre Aydın ^{[b]}	Finley; Dima Bilan; Leona Lewis; Shiri Maimon	Fettes Brot; Happyendless; Amaral; Stereo Mike; Suspekt; Nightwish; Erik og Kriss; Neverstore; Quest Pistols; Elvir Laković Laka; Morandi; De Jeugd van Tegenwoordig; Zaho; Feel; Buraka Som Sistema; Gonzo
2009	maNga	Deep Insight; Lost; Doda (Runner-up); Dima Bilan	Inna; Lollobrigida Girls; Agnes; Esmée Denters; The Kolin; Stress; Pixie Lott; Orelsan; Ninet Tayeb; Medina; We Are Standard; Xutos e Pontapés; Leon Somov & Jazzu; Yoga Fire; Silbermond; Lama; Helena Paparizou

== 2010s ==
Year	Winner	Nominees	Pre-nomination
2010	Marco Mengoni	Afromental; Dima Bilan; Enrique Iglesias; Inna	Caro Emerald; Gramophonedzie; Ivri Lider; Charlie Straight; Swedish House Mafia; Karpe Diem; Stam1na; Rasmus Seebach; Max Barskih; Marina and the Diamonds; Sido; Greis; Pony Pony Run Run; Nu Soul Family; The Kolin; Sakis Rouvas
2011	Lena	Adele; Alexandra Stan; Atiye Deniz; Aurea; Ben Saunders; Charlie Straight; Compact Disco; dEUS; Dubioza Kolektiv; Eva & The Heartmaker; Ewa Farna; Gimma; La Fouine; Lauri Ylönen; Mark F. Angelo featuring Shaya; Medina; Modà; Nyusha; Russian Red; Sirena; Swedish House Mafia; The Young Professionals	
2012	Dima Bilan	30Y; Afrojack; Alloise; Aurea; DJ Antoine; Emis Killa; Erik & Kriss; Loreen; Majk Spirit; Medina; Milow; Monika Brodka; Ninet Tayeb; One Direction; Robin; Shaka Ponk; Tim Bendzko; Vegas; Vunk; Who See; The Zombie Kids	
2013	Bednarek ^{[c]}	Frenkie; Celeste Buckingham; Ivan and the Parazol; The Ultras; Smiley; Zemfira	
2013	One Direction ^{[d]}	Jimilian; Isac Elliot; Admiral P; Avicii	
2013	Lena ^{[e]}	Stromae; Bastian Baker; Kensington	
2013	Marco Mengoni ^{[f]}	Auryn; Filipe Pinto; Demy; Shaka Ponk	
2014	Dawid Kwiatkowski ^{[c]}	Nyusha; Van Gogh; Tripl featuring Meital de Razon; Andra	
2014	One Direction ^{[d]}	Adelén; The Fooo; Christopher; Isac Elliot	
2014	Revolverheld ^{[e]}	Dimitri Vegas & Like Mike; Sinplus; Kensington	
2014	Alessandra Amoroso ^{[f]}	Vegas; David Carreira; Enrique Iglesias; Shaka Ponk	
2015	Marco Mengoni	Agir; Astrid S; Black M; Daniel Kajmakoski; Dimitri Vegas & Like Mike; Eliad; Giorgias Mazonakis; Inna; JVG; Kensington; Lena Meyer-Landrut; Little Mix; Lukas Graham; Margaret; MBAND; Stefanie Heinzmann; Sweet California; The Fooo Conspiracy	

^{^[a]}New Sounds of Europe
^{^[b]}Europe's Favourite Act
^{^[c]}Best Eastern European Act
^{^[d]}Best Northern European Act
^{^[e]}Best Central European Act
^{^[f]}Best Southern European Act

== See also ==
- MTV VMA International Viewer's Choice Award for MTV Europe
- European Border Breakers Award
