= Deep Insight =

Finnish rock band

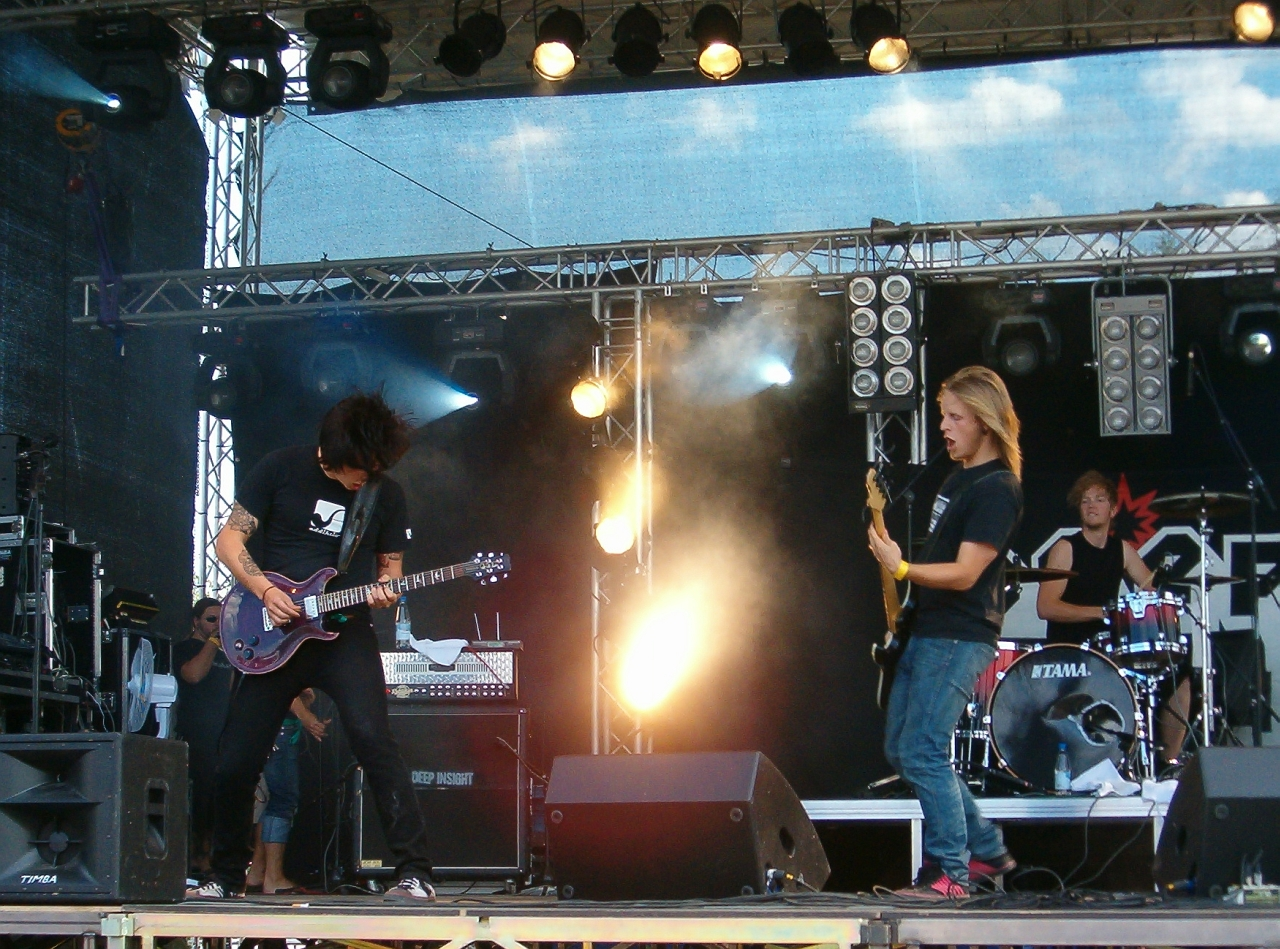
- Deep Insight performs in Rovaniemi Rock festival (2006).

Background information
- Origin: Helsinki, Finland
- Genres: Alternative Metal, Alternative Rock, American Rock, Emo
- Years active: 2002 – Present
- Labels: Warner Music Group, Fullsteam Records
- Members: Jukka; Johannes; Ville; Jore
- Past members: Kaj; Miska
- Website: http://www.deepinsight.net

Deep Insight is a rock band from Helsinki, Finland. The band was formed in early 2002 by childhood friends Jukka (vocals) and Johannes (guitar). They were later joined by Miska (bass) and Ville (drums). Their music is a mixture of American and emo rock, with Scandinavian influences. As of 2008 they had played more than 400 shows in 20 countries. The single Hurricane Season reached number one on the Finnish Singles Chart in 2005, retaining its position for six weeks.

== History ==
The band's first release, an EP titled Julia, was a concept album whose lyrics focused on the life and death of Julia, a character created by Jukka and Johannes. It gained many good reviews, most of them praising the young band's promising songwriting and Jukka's exceptional voice.

In 2003 the band recorded their debut album, Ivory Tower at Soundtrack Studios in Helsinki. The album was produced by Ariel Björklund, and co-produced by his older brother Sebastian "sebu" Björklund. Kaj was replaced by Miska on bass. The album was released in May and the band started their first European tour.

Their second album Red Lights, White Lines was recorded and mixed between June and July 2004 in Fascination Street Studio in Örebro, under producers Jens Borgen and Jonas Olsson. The album was mastered at cutting room in Stockholm by Thomas Eberger. Red Lights, White Lines was released in Finland and Italy in 2004 and later in Germany, Switzerland, Austria, Portugal and Japan in 2005. By the summer of 2005 the album was sold out and re-released in the same fall with new cover art work.

Their third album One Minute Too Late was released in Finland on 18 October 2006. Miska left the band and was replaced by Jore. The album's debut single New Day was released on 20 September 2006 and on its second week reached number 1 on Finland's YleX most wanted chart.

== Discography ==
=== Albums ===
- Ivory Tower (Fullsteam 2003)

1. Zebras On The Wall 2. Superficial 3. Ocean 4. Into Another 5. Ivory Tower 6. Falling Through Time 7. Stockholm 8. Anthem 9. Vessel Embodied 10. Last Remembrance 11. Waters Of Lethe 12. Pandas Lucky Leopold

Recorded and engineered by: Mikko Oinonen at Soundtrack Studio, Helsinki Produced by: Ariel Björklund Co-produced by: Daniel Weeks and Sebastian Björklund Mastered by: Rickard Monsén at Cutting Room, Stockholm, Sweden Art direction / design by: Ariel Björklund Photography: Roy Pietilä Additional photography: Sanna Mattila Released by: Fullsteam Records

- Red Lights, White Lines (Fullsteam 2004)

1. Three-Ring Circus 2. Red Tape 3. Itch 4. Since You Resigned 5. My Testimony 6. Hurricane Season 7. Failsafe 8. Background Symphony 9. Detonator 10. Pushover 11. Lay Your Hands

2nd version includes Hurricane Season video

Produced by: Jonas Olsson and Jens Bogren Engineered & mixed by: Jens Bogren with Jonas Olsson at Fascination Street, Örebro Sweden June–July 2004 Mastered by: Thomas Eberger at Cutting Room, Stockholm Art concept and design: Aretwo Photography: Elina Viitanen Released by: Fullsteam Records

- One Minute Too Late (HMC 2006)

1. One Minute Too Late 2. Put Your Money Where Your Mouth Is Baby 3. New Day 4. Ordinary Girl 5. Rhythm Of The Beat 6. Sometimes I'm Always There 7. Five Minute Murder 8. Petunia 9. Never Ever 10. Time Is A Remedy 11. Dream On

- Sucker for Love (Warner Music 2009)

1. Let Me Go 2. Dangerous 3. Rock with My Band 4. Sucker for Love 5. Raging Storm 6. Satellite 7. Down to the Fire 8. One Step at a Time 9. Every Minute, Every Second 10. It Kills Me 11. Beautiful to Me

=== Singles ===
- Zebras On The Wall CDS (Fullsteam 2003)

1. Zebras On The Wall (radio edit) 2. Into Another 3. Loveburn 4. Zebras On The Wall

Recorded and engineered by: Mikko Oinonen at Soundtrack Studio, Helsinki Produced by: Ariel Björklund Co-produced by: Daniel Weeks and Sebastian Björklund Mastered by: Rickard Monsén at Cutting Room, Stockholm, Sweden Art direction / design by: Ariel Björklund Released by: Fullsteam Records Produced & Mixed by: Kari Nieminen & Jonas Olsson at MusaMuusa studios

- Itch CDS (Fullsteam 2004)

1. Itch

- Hurricane Season CDS (Fullsteam 2005)

1. Hurricane Season 2. Air Supply 3. Hurricane Season Video

Produced by: Jonas Olsson and Jens Bogren Engineered & mixed by: Jens Bogren with Jonas Olsson Mastered by: Thomas Eberger Art concept and design: Aretwo Photography: Marek Sabogal Released by: Fullsteam Records

Hurricane Season video directed by: Miikka Lommi Produced by: Justin Case

- New Day CDS (HMC 2006)

1. New Day 2. Five Minute Murder

- Rock With My Band CDS (Warner Music 2009)
- Dangerous CDS (Warner Music 2009)

=== EP's ===
Title	Details	Track list	Cover
Julia (Deep Insight)	Release date: 2002; Label: Fullstream Records; Format: CD Digipak; Recorded and mixed by: Arttu Sarvanne at Studio Watercastle; Produced by: Arttu Sarvanne & Deep Insight; Artwork by: Ariel Björklund; Cover picture by: Marie Cygnell	1. Secure (Exhibit A: Julia's Diary) (3:30); 2. September (Exhibit B: Sebastian's Letter) (4:34); 3. Suicide (Officer Martignetti's Report) (4:27); 4. Prophecy (3:15); 5, Lost One (Exhibit C: Sebastian's Letter) (3:45)	
