= Hadise discography =

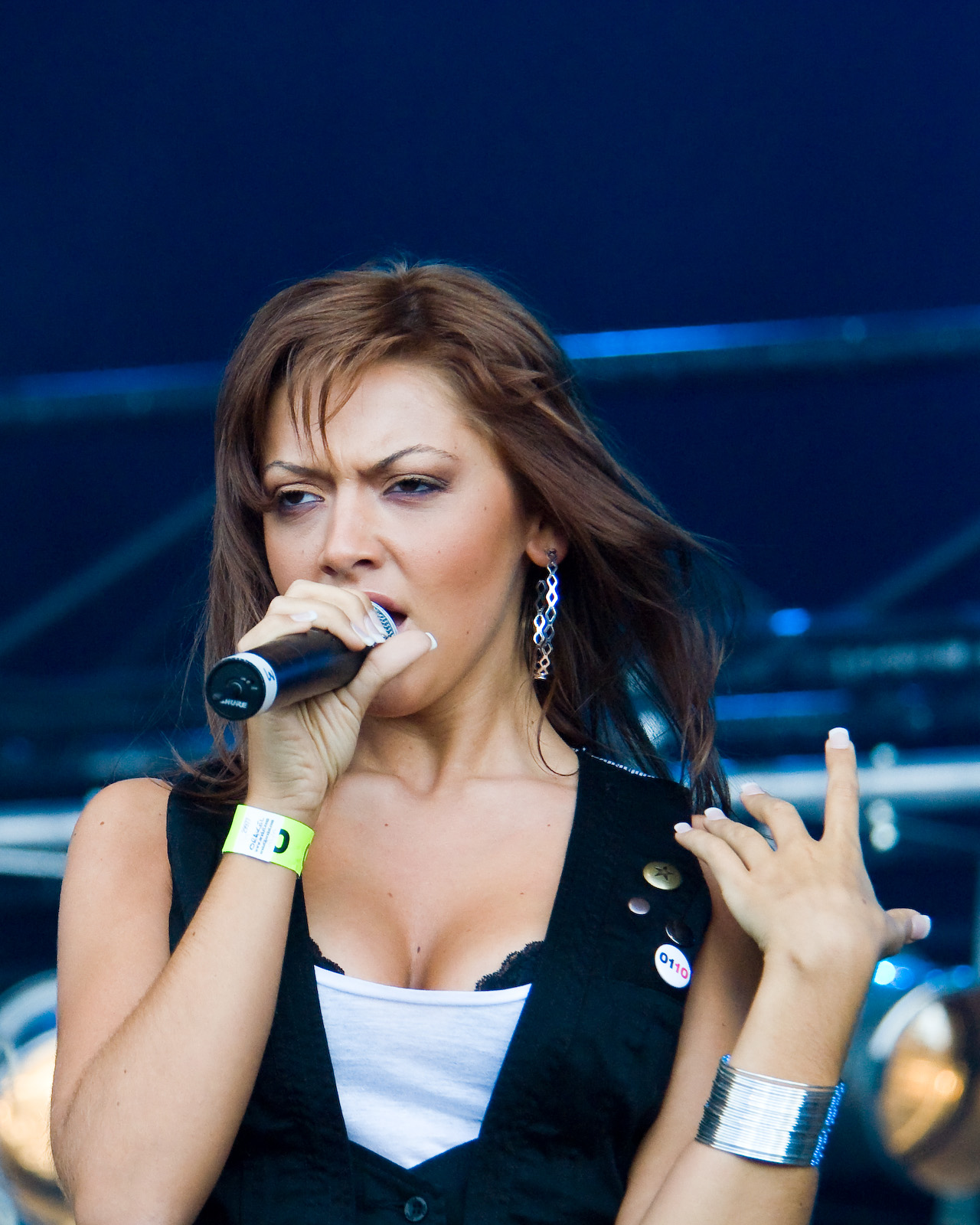
- Hadise performing at a concert in Ghent in 2006
- Studio albums: 7
- Extended plays: 1
- Singles: 35
- B-sides: 4
- Music videos: 34

This is the discography of Belgian-Turkish pop singer-songwriter Hadise, who has released seven studio albums.

Hadise gained fame when she appeared on the Belgium version of Pop idol. She later released her debut album, Sweat, and its lead single "Sweat". It produced four more singles: "Stir Me Up", the more successful "Milk Chocolate Girl", "Ain't No Love Lost" and "Bad Boy". She then released her second studio album, "Hadise", which has so far become more commercially successful than her previous album and has thus produced four singles: "A Good Kiss", "My Body", "My Man and the Devil on His Shoulder" and "Deli Oğlan".

== Studio albums ==
Title	Details	Peak chart positions		Sales
Title	Details	TUR	BEL (FL)	Sales
Sweat	Released: November 12, 2005; Label: EMI; Formats: Digital download, CD	15	52	
Hadise	Released: June 6, 2008; Label: EMI; Formats: Digital download, CD	2	19	
Fast Life	Released: May 11, 2009; Label: EMI; Formats: Digital download, CD	2	16	
Kahraman	Released: June 19, 2009; Label: EMI; Formats: Digital download, CD	1	—	
Aşk Kaç Beden Giyer?	Released: April 14, 2011; Label: Seyhan Müzik; Formats: Digital download, CD	3	—	TUR: 35,000
Tavsiye	Released: August 4, 2014; Label: Pasaj; Formats: Digital download, CD	2	—	TUR: 16,000
Şampiyon	Released: June 30, 2017; Label: Pasaj; Formats: Digital download, CD	—	171	
H.	Released: May 8, 2026; Label: Pasaj; Formats: Digital download	—	—	
"—" denotes a recording that did not chart or was not released.

== Extended plays ==
Title	Details	Peak chart positions
Title	Details	TUR
Düm Tek Tek	Released: April 3, 2009; Label: EMI; Formats: Digital download, CD	1
Aşka Kapandım	Released: February 19, 2021; Label: Pasaj; Formats: Digital download	—
"—" denotes a recording that did not chart or was not released.

== Singles ==
Year	Title	Peak chart positions										Album
Year	Title	TUR	BEL (FL)	BEL (Wa)	FIN Down.	GER	JAP	NL	SWE	SWI	UK	Album
2004	"Sweat"	—	19	64	—	—	—	—	—	—	—	Sweat
2005	"Stir Me Up"	2	22	—	—	—	—	—	—	—	—	Sweat
2005	"Milk Chocolate Girl"	—	13	—	—	—	—	—	—	—	—	Sweat
2006	"Ain't No Love Lost"	—	45	—	—	—	—	—	—	—	—	Sweat
2006	"Bad Boy"	1	22	—	—	—	—	—	—	—	—	Sweat
2007	"A Good Kiss"	1	28	—	—	—	—	—	—	—	—	Hadise
2008	"My Body"	3	8	—	—	—	—	—	—	—	—	Hadise
2008	"My Man and the Devil on His Shoulder"	6	59	—	—	—	—	—	—	—	—	Hadise
2008	"Deli Oğlan"^{1}	3	—	—	—	—	—	—	—	—	—	Hadise
2008	"Aşkkolik"^{1}	17	—	—	—	—	—	—	—	—	—	Hadise
2009	"Düm Tek Tek"	1	1	24	29	70	21	99	12	73	127	Fast Life
2009	"Fast Life"	7	52	—	—	—	—	—	—	—	—	Fast Life
2009	"Evlenmeliyiz"^{1}	6	—	—	—	—	—	—	—	—	—	Kahraman
2010	"Kahraman"^{1}	18	—	—	—	—	—	—	—	—	—	Kahraman
2011	"Superman"^{1}	5	—	—	—	—	—	—	—	—	—	Aşk Kaç Beden Giyer?
2011	"Aşk Kaç Beden Giyer?"^{1}	2	—	—	—	—	—	—	—	—	—	Aşk Kaç Beden Giyer?
2012	"Mesajımı Almıştır O"^{1}	10	—	—	—	—	—	—	—	—	—	Aşk Kaç Beden Giyer?
2012	"Biz Burdayız"^{1}	—	—	—	—	—	—	—	—	—	—	Non-album singles
2013	"Visal"^{1}	1	—	—	—	—	—	—	—	—	—	Non-album singles
2014	"Nerdesin Aşkım"^{1}	1	—	—	—	—	—	—	—	—	—	Tavsiye
2014	"Prenses"^{1}	1	—	—	—	—	—	—	—	—	—	Tavsiye
2015	"Yaz Günü"^{1}	1	—	—	—	—	—	—	—	—	—	Tavsiye
2016	"Bu Aralar"^{1}	4	—	—	—	—	—	—	—	—	—	Tavsiye
2017	"Şampiyon"	7	—	—	—	—	—	—	—	—	—	Şampiyon
2017	"Sıfır Tolerans"	1	—	—	—	—	—	—	—	—	—	Şampiyon
2018	"Sıfır Tolerans" (Acoustic)	—	—	—	—	—	—	—	—	—	—	Non-album single
2018	"Farkımız Var"	6	—	—	—	—	—	—	—	—	—	Şampiyon
2019	"Aşk Dediğin"	12	—	—	—	—	—	—	—	—	—	Şampiyon
2019	"Geliyorum Yanına"	4	—	—	—	—	—	—	—	—	—	Non-album single
2020	"Küçük Bir Yol"	3	—	—	—	—	—	—	—	—	—	Aşka Kapandım
2021	"Olsun"	9	—	—	—	—	—	—	—	—	—	Aşka Kapandım
2021	"Hay Hay"	1	—	—	—	—	—	—	44	—	—	Non-album singles
2021	"Coş Dalgalan"	7	—	—	—	—	—	—	—	—	—	Non-album singles
2022	"İmdat" (with Murda)	14	—	—	—	—	—	—	—	—	—	Non-album singles
2023	"Feryat"	10	—	—	—	—	—	—	—	—	—	Non-album singles
2023	"Sen Dönene Kadar" (with Murda)	39	—	—	—	—	—	—	—	—	—	Non-album singles
2023	"Sevmiyo"	26	—	—	—	—	—	—	—	—	—	Non-album singles
2024	"Hayat Oyunu"	—	—	—	—	—	—	—	—	—	—	Non-album singles
2024	"Baksana Bana"	—	—	—	—	—	—	—	—	—	—	Non-album singles
2025	"Gecenin En Köründe"	—	—	—	—	—	—	—	—	—	—	Non-album singles
2025	"Fırtınam"	—	—	—	—	—	—	—	—	—	—	Non-album singles
2025	"Derdim" (with Murda)	—	—	—	—	—	—	—	—	—	—	Non-album singles
2026	"Gece Puslu"	—	—	—	—	—	—	—	—	—	—	
2026	"Küçük Bir Yol (Red Bull Track Takeover)"	1	—	—	—	—	—	—	—	—	—	
2026	"Labirent"	1	—	—	—	—	—	—	—	—	—	
"—" denotes a recording that did not chart or was not released.

1. Only released in Turkey

== B-sides ==
Year	Title	A-side
2005	"Ain't Doing It Right"	"Milk Chocolate Girl"
2006	"Burdayım"	"Ain't No Love Lost"
2006	"Su Halimi"	"Bad Boy"
2008	"A Song for My Mother"	"My Man and the Devil on His Shoulder"

== Guest appearances ==
Year	Title	Artist	Album
2008	"Düşman"	Serdar Ortaç	Nefes

== Music videos ==
Year	Title	Director	Album
As lead artist
2005	"Stir Me Up"	Şenol Korkmaz	Sweat
2005	"Milk Chocolate Girl"	Şenol Korkmaz	Sweat
2006	"Ain't No Love Lost"	Şenol Korkmaz	Sweat
2006	"Bad Boy"	Şenol Korkmaz	Sweat
2007	"A Good Kiss"	Şenol Korkmaz	Hadise
2008	"My Body"	Şenol Korkmaz	Hadise
2008	"Deli Oğlan"	Emir Khalilzadeh	Hadise
2009	"Düm Tek Tek"	Metin Arolat	Fast Life
2009	"Fast Life"	Şenol Korkmaz	Fast Life
2009	"Evlenmeliyiz"	Emir Khalilzadeh	Kahraman
2010	"Kahraman"	Şenol Korkmaz	Kahraman
2011	"Superman"	Nihat Odabaşı	Aşk Kaç Beden Giyer?
2011	"Aşk Kaç Beden Giyer?"	Hülya Açıkgöz	Aşk Kaç Beden Giyer?
2012	"Mesajımı Almıştır O"	Hülya Açıkgöz	Aşk Kaç Beden Giyer?
2012	"Biz Burdayız"	Hülya Açıkgöz	Non-album singles
2013	"Visal"	Hülya Açıkgöz	Non-album singles
2014	"Nerdesin Aşkım"	Hülya Açıkgöz	Tavsiye
2014	"Prenses"	Hülya Açıkgöz	Tavsiye
2015	"Yaz Günü"	Hülya Açıkgöz	Tavsiye
2016	"Bu Aralar"	Hülya Açıkgöz	Tavsiye
2017	"Şampiyon"	Hülya Açıkgöz	Şampiyon
2017	"Sıfır Tolerans"	Hülya Açıkgöz	Şampiyon
2018	"Sıfır Tolerans" (Acoustic)	Hülya Açıkgöz	Non-album single
2018	"Farkımız Var"	Hülya Açıkgöz	Şampiyon
2019	"Aşk Dediğin"	Şenol Korkmaz	Şampiyon
2019	"Geliyorum Yanına"	Şenol Korkmaz	Non-album singles
2020	"Küçük Bir Yol"	Şenol Korkmaz	Non-album singles
2021	"Olsun"	Şenol Korkmaz	Aşka Kapandım
2021	"Hay Hay"	Şenol Korkmaz	Non-album singles
2021	"Coş Dalgalan"	Şenol Korkmaz	Non-album singles
2022	"İmdat" (with Murda)	Jonas Beck	Non-album singles
2023	"Feryat"	Utku Kemal	Non-album singles
2023	"Sen Dönene Kadar" (with Murda)	Jonas Beck & Caio Silva	Non-album singles
2023	"Sevmiyo"	Utku Kemal	Non-album singles
2024	"Hayat Oyunu"	Şenol Korkmaz	Non-album singles
2024	"Baksana Bana"	Şenol Sönmez	Non-album singles
2025	"Gecenin En Köründe"	Şenol Sönmez	Non-album singles
2025	"Fırtınam"	Utku Kemal	Non-album singles
2025	"Derdim" (with Murda)	Utku Kemal	Non-album singles
2026	"Gece Puslu"	Abdullah Yazıc	Non-album singles
2026	"Labirent"	Utku Kemal	Non-album singles
As featured artist
2009	"Ongezouten" (Els de Schepper featuring Hadise)		
