= List of awards and nominations received by Hadise =

Hadise awards and nominations
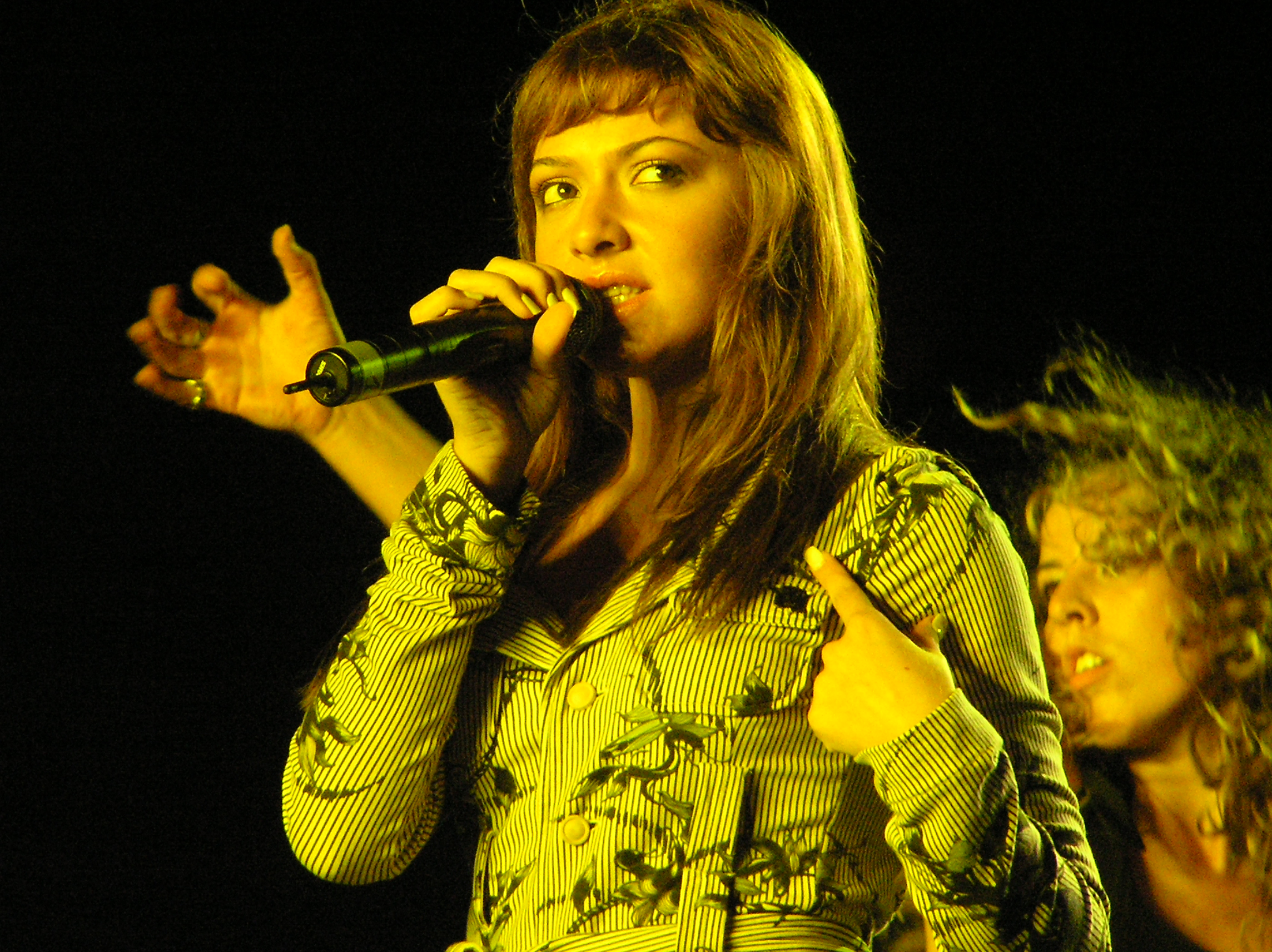
- Hadise performing in Antwerp, August 2006
Awards and nominations
Award	Wins	Nominations
MTV Europe	0	1
Altın Kelebek	6	6
Jetix Kids Award (Turkey)	1	1
Kral TV Awards	0	2
TMF Awards	2	10
Power Turk Music award	1	2

Totals (Note: Certain award groups do not simply award one winner. They acknowledge several different recipients, have runners-up, and have third place. Since this is a specific recognition and is different from losing an award, runner-up mentions are considered wins in this award tally. For simplification and to avoid errors, each award in this list has been presumed to have had a prior nomination.)
- Wins: 12
- Nominations: 23

Hadise is a Belgian-Turkish singer-songwriter. She has released seven studio albums, Sweat (2005), Hadise (2008), Fast Life (2009), Kahraman (2009), Aşk Kaç Beden Giyer? (2011), Tavsiye (2014) and Şampiyon (2017).

Hadise has received nominations in a variety of awards, including six TMF Awards, three Altın Kelebek Awards, two Kral TV Awards, one MTV Europe Music Awards and one Jetix Kids Awards. Her second single, "Stir Me Up", gave Hadise her first award win, an Altin Kelebek Award for Best New Act, in Turkey.

== Altın Kelebek ==
Year	Award	Nominated work	Result	Reference
2005	Best New Female Soloist	Hadise	Won	
2009	Song of the Year	Düm Tek Tek	Won	
2009	Pop Artist of the Year	Hadise	Won	
2017	Best Pop Music Female Artist	Farkımız Var	Nominated	
2018	Best Music Video	Farkımız Var	Won	
2018	Best Pop Music Female Artist	Hadise	Nominated	
2019	Best Music Video	Aşk Dediğin	Won	
2019	Best Female Singer	Hadise	Nominated	
2021	Best Female Singer	Hadise	Won	

== Balkan Music Awards ==
Year	Award	Nominated work	Result	Reference
2010	Best Turkish Female	Fast Life	Won	
2010	Best Female Artist		Won	

== Jetix Kids Award (Turkey) ==
Year	Award	Nominated work	Result	Reference
2009	Best Turkish Female	Deli Oğlan	Won	

== Kral TV Awards ==
Year	Award	Nominated work	Result	Reference
2009	Song Of The Year	Deli Oğlan	Nominated	
2009	Pop Artist Of The Year	Deli Oğlan	Nominated	

== MIA Awards (Belgium) ==
Year	Award	Nominated work	Result	Reference
2010	Song Of The Year	Düm Tek Tek	Nominated	
2010	Pop Artist Of The Year	Hadise	Nominated	
2010	Music Video Of The Year	Fast Life	Nominated	

== MTV EMA Awards ==
The MTV Europe Music Awards (EMA) is an annual awards ceremony established in 1994 by MTV. Hadise has received one nomination.

Year	Award	Nominated work	Result	Reference
2008	Best Turkish Act	Deli Oğlan	Nominated	

== TMF Awards (Belgium) ==
The TMF awards is an annual awards ceremony established in 1995 by TMF. Hadise has received ten nomination and of those ten has won two.

Year	Award	Nominated work	Result	Reference
2005	Best New Artist	Sweat	Nominated	
2006	Best Urban Act	Sweat	Won	
2007	Best Urban Act	A Good Kiss	Won	
2008	Best Female Artist	Hadise	Nominated	
2008	Best Urban Act	My Body	Nominated	
2008	Best Video	My Body	Nominated	
2009	Best Female Artist	Hadise	Nominated	
2009	Best Urban Act	Hadise	Won	
2009	Best Video	Fast Life	Nominated	
2009	Best Album	Fast Life	Nominated	
