= Aşkkolik =

Single by Hadise

from the album Hadise
- Released: 12 October 2008 (Airplay)
- Recorded: 2008
- Genre: Electropop, dance-pop
- Label: EMI
- Songwriter(s): Deniz Erten
- Producer(s): Özgür Buldum

Hadise singles chronology
"Deli Oğlan" (2008)	"Aşkkolik" (2008)	"Düm Tek Tek" (2009)

"Aşkkolik" (En. Love Addict) is the fifth single, tenth overall, by Belgian singer Hadise from her second self-entitled studio album Hadise. The single is the second Turkish song on the album.

== Background ==
The song is written by Deniz Erten and produced by Özgür Buldum. "Aşkkolik" differs to most of Hadise's releases except My Body. Both songs are more electronic unlike other releases which are more R&B influenced.

== Music video ==
The single begun receiving airplay when the album was released, but a music video was not shot. However, on 2 November 2008, owing to the popularity of the song and the fact that the song had no video, the Turkish music channel "Powertürk TV" released a collage using music videos from Hadise's previous music videos. These included "My Body", "Deli Oğlan" and "A Good Kiss".

Hadise was unable to promote the song as she was preparing possible songs for the 2009 Eurovision Song Contest.

== Chart performance ==
Aşkkolik started to receive airplay due to the huge success of the previous Turkish single "Deli Oğlan", and it led to the song charting on many radio charts and the official Turkish billboard Chart.

== Charts ==
Chart (2008)	Peak position
Turkish Top 20 Chart (Official)	17
