= Fast Life =

Fast Life may refer to:

- Fast Life (1929 film), a 1929 film starring Douglas Fairbanks Jr. and Loretta Young
- Fast Life (1932 film), a 1932 film starring William Haines and Madge Evans
- Fast Life (David Murray album), a 1991 album by jazz musician David Murray
- Fast Life (Paul Wall album), a 2009 album by American rapper Paul Wall
- Fast Life (Hadise album), a 2009 album by Turkish/Belgian musician Hadise
- Fastlife, a 2011 album by American recording artist Joe Jonas
- Fast Life (Young Noble & Deuce Deuce album), a 2013 album by Young Noble & Deuce Deuce
- "Fast Life" (Kool G Rap song), a 1995 song by American rapper Kool G Rap featuring Nas Escobar
- "Fast Life" (Hadise song), a 2009 single by Turkish/Belgian musician Hadise
- Fast Life (Re-Up Gang song), 2009
- "Fast Life", a 2008 song by Flo Rida from Mail on Sunday
