= Evlenmeliyiz =

Single by Hadise

from the album Kahraman
- Released: 6 July 2009
- Recorded: 2009
- Genre: Pop
- Label: EMI
- Songwriter(s): Sinan Akçıl
- Producer(s): Sinan Akçıl

Hadise singles chronology
"Fast Life" (2009)	"Evlenmeliyiz" (2009)	"Kahraman" (2010)

"Evlenmeliyiz" (En. We Should Marry) is the lead single, thirteenth overall, by Turkish singer Hadise from her fourth studio album Kahraman.

== Music video ==
The music video for "Evlenmeliyiz" was filmed in front of a green screen and was filmed in one shot. The music video starts off with Hadise walking down a country road, then the set is quickly changed so that she is outside a café. Hadise is then seen getting out of her seat and continues to sing whilst the set is being cleared and a car is the bought on stage. Hadise is then seen "driving", the set is then changed to a boat, then a red carpet with paparazzi. The scene is then changed to show Hadise "driving" on a moped, then finally the scene is changed to a performing stage.

== Charts ==
Chart (2008)	Peak position
Turkish Top 20 Chart (Official)	6
