= Aşk Kaç Beden Giyer? =

Studio album by Hadise
- Released: 12 April 2011
- Genre: Dance-pop • R&B
- Length: 33:47
- Label: Seyhan
- Producer: Hadise

Hadise chronology
Kahraman (2009)	Aşk Kaç Beden Giyer? (2011)	Tavsiye (2014)

Aşk Kaç Beden Giyer? (What Size Does Love Wear?) is the fifth studio album by Turkish-Belgian singer Hadise. It was released on 12 April 2011 by Seyhan Müzik. The preparations began in 2010 and Hadise announced that she had planned to publish it by the end of the year. However, due to her break up with her then-boyfriend Sinan Akçıl in November 2010, and Akçıl's decision to take back some of the songs that he had prepared for the album, the release date for the album was postponed. Hadise produced the album and worked with Alper Narman, Deniz Erten, Erdem Kınay and Gülşen on this project.

A dance-pop album, Aşk Kaç Beden Giyer? became the topic of many tabloid discussions as many believed that its lyrics had references to Hadise and Sinan Akçıl's relationship. Some of the music critics found the album to be ordinary, but some of them praised the fact that the songs were above Turkish pop music standards. Hadise appeared with a leopard patterned dress on the photographs for the album's cover, and her appearance was compared to that of Beyoncé by some critics.

Three of the album's songs were turned into music videos. The oriental-inspired lead single "Superman" was the first song for which a music video was released and it rose to number 5 on Türkçe Top 20. Its music video, directed by Nihat Odabaşı, was praised by the critics. The second and third music videos were released for the songs "Aşk Kaç Beden Giyer?" and "Mesajımı Almıştır O" respectively. The music videos for these two songs were directed by Hadise's elder sister Hülya Açıkgöz. By the end of 2011, "Superman" and "Aşk Kaç Beden Giyer?" became the eight and fourth most-downloaded songs in Turkey respectively.

Aşk Kaç Beden Giyer? ranked 10th on D&R's Best-Selling list and by the end of 2011 sold 35,000 copies in Turkey. To promote the album Hadise gave concerts at various places in Turkey, and performed her songs at the 38th Golden Butterfly Awards and on Beyaz Show. The album was nominated as the Best Album at the 2012 OMÜ Media Awards, and its lead single "Superman" received the Best Music Video award at the 2nd Pal FM Music Awards.

== Background and development ==
After representing Turkey at the Eurovision Song Contest 2009 with the song "Düm Tek Tek", written by Sinan Akçıl, and placing fourth in the contest, Hadise released the album Fast Life and Kahraman in the same year. Hadise's first Turkish album Kahraman was produced by Sinan Akçıl and shortly after its release reports about his relationship with Hadise appeared in the press. The couple split in November 2010, which resulted in a longer preparation process for the album as Akçıl took back four songs that he had already given to Hadise. Their breakup caused speculations about whether the songs on the album's final version where referencing Akçıl or not.

Meanwhile, Hadise gave various information on the album throughout 2010. In March, on an interview with PowerTürk TV she stated that preparing the album was taking longer than what she had expected and that she was planning on publishing a maxi single first. In another interview in July with Elle magazine, she announced that the album would be released in October. However, after her breakup with Sinan Akçıl, he took back the songs "Aşkım", "Başkan", "Bebek" and "Kalbine Bir Şey Olmuş", leaving Hadise with only three songs, which forced her to postpone the release date. In September she signed a contract with Seyhan Müzik, and at the same time began sharing the lyrics of her new song. On the first days of 2011, it was reported that she had received a song by Gülşen.

== Music and lyrics ==
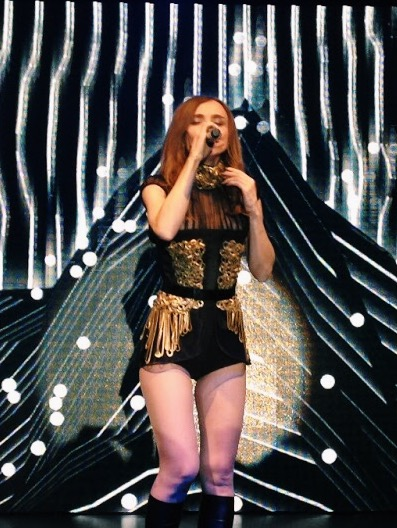
Gülşen wrote and composed the album's lead single "Superman".

In the period before its release, Hadise said that "music felt as a turning point in my life and [the album] was done out of good music", and Aşk Kaç Beden Giyer? was eventually released as a dance-pop album. In her opinion, instead of encouraging depression, the album was about "enjoying life, being strong and loving yourself". Alper Narman and Deniz Erten each wrote three songs for the album, while Gökhan Şahin wrote two of the songs and Gülşen only one of them. Erdem Kınay composed and arranged five of the album's songs. Hadise herself produced the album, and her elder sister Hülya Açıkgöz served as general coordinator. Parts of the recording was done in Turkey, and the other parts were done in Belgium. All of the mixing was done in Antwerp by Ozan Aktaş, a member of the Street Fabulous production, at the Trez Record Studios, while the audio mastering was done in Brussels at the Electric City studio by Alan Ward.

The album contains nine songs and its first song, "Burjuva", was a dance song with high tempo written by Alper Narman, and according to some music critics the song's chorus, "Adam mısın süslü burjuva? (Are you a man, dressed-up in a bourgeois?) / Patlar o pasta bebek suratında (This cake is smashing against your face) / Kıvır durma tatminsiz diva (Come on, sway, unsatisfied diva) / Yolu kapatma, haydi bye bye (Don't block the road, so bye bye)", was a reference to Hadise's ex-boyfriend Sinan Akçıl. Milliyet's Ali Eyüboğlu believed that the phrase "ornate bourgeois" was a direct reference to Akçıl. Hadise denied all of these rumors and said that the songs were there "just to make the album beautiful". The second and third songs "Mesajımı Almıştır O" and "Aşk Kaç Beden Giyer?" also had high tempos and were written by Gökhan Şahin and Deniz Erten. The song "Aşk Kaç Beden Giyer?", which questioned the idea of living through numerous loves at the same time, was according to Gerçek Pop's Fatih Melek "the reason the album came to existence" because of its vocal arrangement and good use of samples. The synth-pop song "Kalbine Yalan Bulma" was composed by Erdem Kınay, followed by the fifth song "Melek", composed by Hadise and Youssef Chellak. The sixth song "Yetenek", was a slow-paced song written by Alper Narman. The seventh song was named after the American comic books character Superman, due to the use of his name in the song's chorus: "Nasıl bir düşmek bu böyle gözden? (What kind of falling into disfavor is this?) / Superman olsan toplayamazsın (You couldn't fix that, even if you were Superman)". The song featured oriental elements and was composed by Gülşen, and due to its characteristics, it was considered by music critics irrelevant to the rest of the album. The song "Macera", composed by Erdem Kınay, was compared by Fatih Melek to Paul Oakenfold's "Faster Kill Pussycat". Ozan Doğulu composed the album's final song "Harakiri".

== Cover and release ==
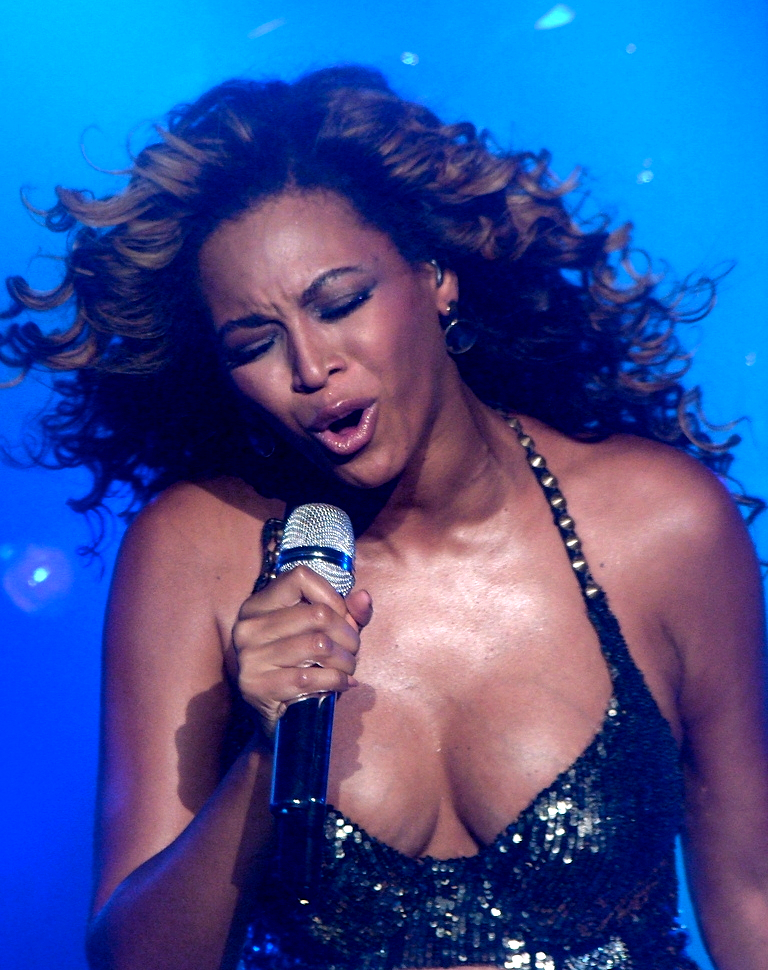
Hadise's image on the cover was found similar to Beyoncé's general appearance.

Aşk Kaç Beden Giyer?'s photographs were taken by Duy Quoc Vo. Hadise's hair and makeup for the photographs were done by Lisselotte van Saarloos and Mahmut Karadağ served as the general stylist. Hadise's hair was dyed brown for the photo shoot and she appeared in front of a pail oil green background, wearing a leopard-patterned dress. The pail green color was used as the main color for the album's frame. Hadise's appearance in the photographs was compared by many journalists and music critics to that of American singer Beyoncé. Hürriyet's Onur Baştürk addressed the issue and said "On the cover of the album, Hadise is quite resembling Beyoncé. The stance, the look, the hair, the auto-tanned skin, the excess skin color ... I don't mind. She is carrying this Beyoncé attitude very well." Gerçek Pop's Fatih Melek also commented on the album's cover and described it as a "disastrous album cover as usual". Hadise saw the comments as a "great compliment", yet denied the similarities and stated that she didn't use anyone as a model for the photo shoots and they only applied that theme due to its suitability. She also emphasized that she didn't want to be "a copy of another artist".

Hadise's fifth studio album Aşk Kaç Beden Giyer? was released by Seyhan Müzik on 12 April 2011 on digital platforms, and in CD format on 14 April in Turkey. It was the Hadise's only album that was distributed by Seyhan Müzik. The album ranked tenth on D&R's Best-Selling list and according to MÜ-YAP sold 35,000 physical copies by the end of the year, becoming the twenty-eighth best-selling album of the year. Together with its release, it was advertised in 11 different parts of Istanbul on great commercial buildings. According to Vatan the cost of one of these monthly advertisements was ₺55,000 at the time. Aşk Kaç Beden Giyer? earned Hadise the Best Female Artist award at the 18th Golden Objective Awards. The album was nominated for the Best Album Award at the 2012 OMÜ Media Awards.

== Critical reception ==
Aşk Kaç Beden Giyer? received mixed reviews from music critics. Some found the songs suitable based on Hadise's style, while some found them too ordinary and mediocre. Hürriyet's Onur Baştürk believed that thanks to the album Hadise "has distanced herself from her Eurovision style and finally found some appropriate cool songs for herself" and stated that it was the "Turkish pop album with the most dynamic and western sound that I've listened to for a long time," and attributed this quality to Erdem Kınay's composition. Hayat Müzik's critic Yavuz Hakan Tok also published a review on the website, saying the album was "not bad at all and a few songs are over the standard line for Turkish pop". Tok went on to say that in general the album "has given signals that Hadise cannot go further with her insistence on being the 'Turkish Beyoncé or Shakira'." Writing for Söz Müzik, Mine Ayman also liked the album and stated: "Hadise really worked hard for this album and collaborated with the best names of music industry. [...] It's been a long time since I wanted to listen repeatedly to an album as beautiful as this." Milliyet's Tolga Akyıldız also liked the album and wrote: "Hadise's album is one of the best pop albums of the year."

Gerçek Pop's editor Fatih Melek found the album mediocre, giving it 2,5/5, and believed that "Kınay's works in this album do not sound as good as his previous works", describing it as a misfortune for Hadise. He also said that "To surprise the Turkish market, she distanced herself from R&B and changed her genre to dance music, but the result indicates that it was not a good move for Hadise." Radikal's Sarp Dakni wrote about the album: "Finally a 30 minute pop / dance album. The best option to let yourself go at the home party that you will give on the weekend." Akşam's Serhat Tekin also described it as "a well-coordinated pop album".

== Promotion ==
=== Live performances ===
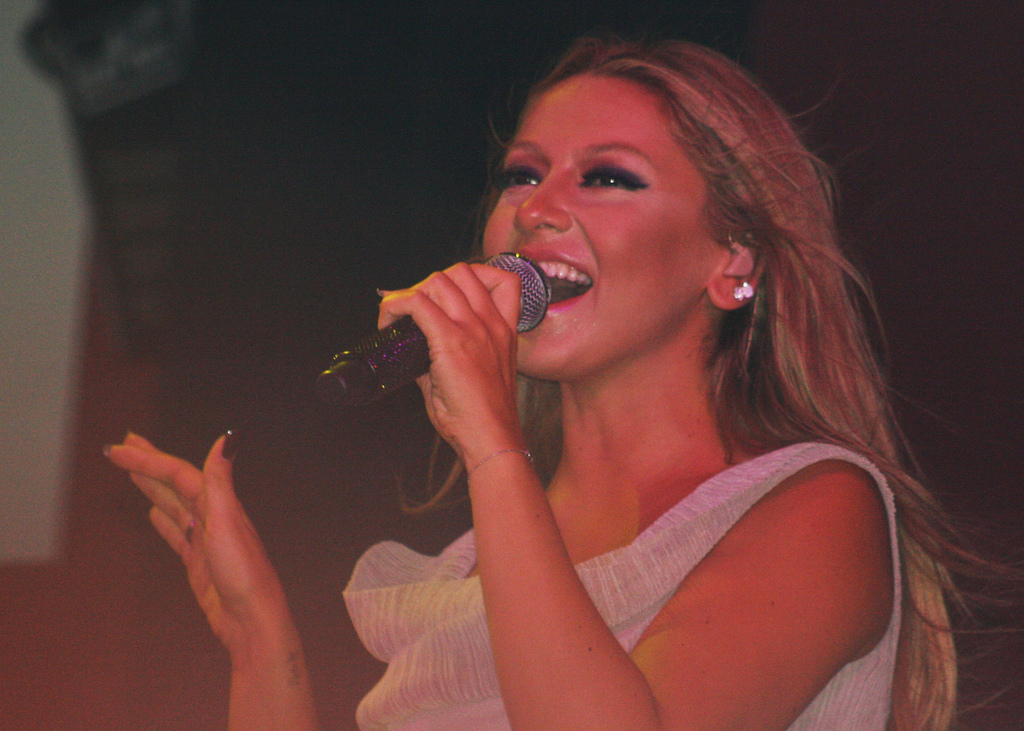
Hadise performing at a concert in October 2011

To promote the album after its release, Hadise gave a concert at the Cemil Topuzlu Open-Air Theatre on 8 July 2011 alongside other concerts at various places in Turkey. Following these concerts, she appeared on numerous TV programs and performed the songs. On 29 April 2011, she appeared on Beyaz Show and performed "Aşk Kaç Beden Giyer?", "Burjuva", "Mesajımı Almıştır O" and "Superman". She appeared on the same program on 4 November, and the show's band performed her song "Aşk Kaç Beden Giyer?" as a türkü. On 13 June, she performed at the 38th Golden Butterfly Awards. She appeared in a white outfit and performed the songs "Aşk Kaç Beden Giyer?", "Melek" and "Superman" while being accompanied by her dancers. On 31 December, on Show TV's New Year program she performed the songs "Aşk Kaç Beden Giyer?", "Mesajımı Almıştır O" and "Superman".

=== Music videos ===
Three songs from Aşk Kaç Beden Giyer? were turned into music videos. The music video for the album's lead single "Superman" was released in April 2011. Nihat Odabaşı directed the video and Hadise was accompanied by a number of dancers on it. However, after the shooting was over, it was reported that a financial issue had been created between Odabaşı and Hadise. According to Milliyet the cost for the video was initially estimated to be ₺50,000 but after the shooting was over Odabaşı demanded an additional amount of ₺12,000 after taking into consideration the taxes, and this resulted in a tension between the parties. On the other hand, the music video of the song was critically acclaimed and received 4 out of 5 on Gerçek Pop. It received the Best Music Video award at the 2nd Pal FM Music Awards and was nominated for the Best Dance Video award at the Gerçek Pop 2011 Awards. The songs ranked fifth on Türkçe Top 20. It was also downloaded over 76,000 times on official websites and was streamed over 2.8 million times on online platforms, becoming Turkey's eighth most downloaded song and third most streamed song in 2011.

The second music video was released for "Aşk Kaç Beden Giyer?". It was directed by Hadise's elder sister Hülya Açıkgöz and released in October. The song won the Best Dance Single award at the Gerçek Pop 2011 Awards. It was downloaded over 87,000 times on official websites and streamed 3.1 million times on online platforms, becoming Turkey's fourth most downloaded song and tenth most streamed song in 2011. The album's last music video was made for the song "Mesajımı Almıştır O" and directed by Hülya Açıkgöz. It was released in March 2012. Hadise appears in the music video while singing the song in front of a microphone and in a studio with walls on which the song's lyrics are written.

== Track listing ==
No.	Title	Writer(s)	Composer(s)	Length
1.	"Burjuva"	Alper Narman	Erdem Kınay	4:06
2.	"Mesajımı Almıştır O"	Gökhan Şahin	Erdem Kınay	3:50
3.	"Aşk Kaç Beden Giyer?"	Deniz Erten	Ender Gündüzlü · Deniz Erten	3:20
4.	"Kalbine Yalan Bulma"	Gökhan Şahin	Erdem Kınay	4:30
5.	"Melek"	Deniz Erten	Hadise · Youssef Chellak	4:01
6.	"Yetenek"	Alper Narman	Erdem Kınay	3:34
7.	"Superman"	Gülşen	Gülşen	3:39
8.	"Macera"	Alper Narman	Erdem Kınay	3:09
9.	"Harakiri"	Deniz Erten	Ozan Doğulu	3:38
Total length:				33:47

== Personnel ==
- Hadise – singer, producer, composer (5), concept
- Alper Narman – songwriter (1, 6, 8)
- Erdem Kınay – composer (1, 2, 4, 6, 8, 9), arranger (1, 2, 4, 6, 8, 9), recording (1, 4, 6, 8, 9)
- Deniz Erten – songwriter (3, 5), composer (3)
- Gökhan Şahin – songwriter (4)
- Gülşen – songwriter (7), composer (7)
- Ender Gündüzlü – composer (3)
- Youssef Chellak – composer (5), arranger (5), recording (2, 3, 5)
- Ozan Çolakoğlu – arranger (7), recording (7)
- Amin Boudouhi – arranger (3)
- Erdem Uyanık – editor (2, 4)
- Metehan Köşeoğlu – guitar (1, 2, 4, 6, 9); acoustic guitar (7)
- Gündem Yaylı Grubu – bowed string instrument (7)
- Mehmet Akatay – percussion (7)
- Fatih Ahıskalı – oud (7), cümbüş (7)
- Can Şengün – electric guitar (7)
- Ozan Aktaş – mixing (all of the songs)
- Alan Ward – mastering (all of the songs)
- Seyhan Müzik (Bülent Seyhan) – producer
- Hülya Açıkgöz – general coordinator
- Duy Quoc Vo – photographer
- Mahmut Karadağ – styling
- Lisselotte van Saarloos – hair, makeup

Credits adapted from Aşk Kaç Beden Giyer?'s album booklet.

== Charts ==
Chart (2011)	Peak position
Turkey (D&R Best-Selling)	10

== Sales ==
Country	Sales
Turkey (MÜ-YAP)	35,000

== Release history ==
Country	Date	Format	Label	Ref.
Turkey	12 April 2011	Digital download	Seyhan Müzik	
Worldwide	12 April 2011	Digital download	Seyhan Müzik	
Turkey	14 April 2011	CD	Seyhan Müzik	
