= My Man and the Devil on His Shoulder =

Single by Hadise

from the album Hadise
- B-side: "A Song for My Mother"
- Released: 6 June 2008 (Belgium)
- Recorded: 2007
- Genre: R&B
- Length: 4:34
- Label: EMI Belgium
- Songwriters: Hadise Acikgöz, Yves Jongen
- Producers: Hadise Acikgöz, Yves Jongen

Hadise singles chronology
"My Body" (2008)	"My Man and the Devil on His Shoulder" (2008)	"Deli Oğlan" (2008)

"My Man and the Devil on His Shoulder" is a song by Belgian-Turkish R&B singer Hadise. It is the third single released from her self-titled second studio album Hadise. It was released on 6 June 2008 with the release of her album. The song has yet to chart on the main ultratop chart, but has been on the ultratip chart for the past 3 weeks, where it is currently at number 11. This is her second release which has no music video, after her debut single "Sweat".

== Subject matter ==
"My Man and the Devil on His Shoulder" refers to adultery. The song sees Hadise suspecting her lover is cheating on her: "I know I never really caught you, caught you in the act". As the song progresses, Hadise is still unsure whether her lover is cheating on her, stating: "There must be something, something on his shirt", but is aware how her lover is "nothing but a liar". As the song ends, the final verse has Hadise singing even though she hasn't found any evidence of her lover cheating she knows he is saying: "I ain't wasting my time, I'm outta here".

== Track listing ==
Belgium CD & iTunes download (Europe)

1. "My Man and the Devil on His Shoulder" - 4:34
2. "A Song For My Mother" - 3:32

== Charts ==
Chart (2008)	Peak position
Belgium (Flanders) Ultratip 30 Chart	9
Turkish Singles Chart	6
