= Ain't No Love Lost =

Single by Hadise

from the album Sweat
- B-side: "Burdayım"
- Released: January 13, 2006 (Belgium)
- Recorded: 2004
- Genre: Pop
- Songwriters: Hadise Açikgöz, Yves Jongen

Hadise singles chronology
"Milk Chocolate Girl" (2005)	"Ain't No Love Lost" (2006)	"Bad Boy" (2006)

"Ain't No Love Lost" is the fourth single by Belgian-Turkish singer Hadise from her debut album Sweat. "Ain't No Love Lost" is an English R&B/Ballad song.

== Chart performance ==
"Ain't No Love Lost" is the lowest charting song on the Belgium Top 50, only spending two weeks on the chart and peaking at 45.

== Charts ==
Chart (2006)	Peak position
Belgium Singles Top 50	45

== Track listing ==
1. "Ain't No Love Lost"
2. "Burdayım"
