= Turkish music charts =

Turkish music charts track the popularity of music within Turkey, primarily focusing on album and song performance. Historically, various organizations have compiled these charts, including Nielsen Music Control, Radiomonitor, and Billboard Türkiye. In the pre-internet era, unlike many countries, Turkey's music industry was album-oriented, and no national singles chart was issued based on sales alone.

There were three single charts derived from the main chart and issued by Billboard Türkiye magazine that are considered official:

- Türkçe Top 20 - lists only Turkish language songs (published by Nielsen Music Control)
- Türkiye Top 20 - lists only foreign songs (published by Billboard Türkiye), although it was shut down in 2010.
- Turkish Rock Top 20 Chart, lists Turkish language rock songs and is published by Billboard Türkiye.

The current single chart is published by Radiomonitor Türkiye. Billboard has also continued to publish Turkey Songs chart, which exclusively list trending Turkish-language songs weekly.

== See also ==
- Billboard Türkiye
- Radiomonitor Türkiye
- Music of Turkey
