= Deli Oğlan =

Single by Hadise

from the album Hadise
- Released: 6 June 2008 (Turkey)
- Recorded: 2008
- Genre: Pop, R&B
- Length: 3:12
- Label: EMI
- Songwriter(s): Sezen Aksu
- Producer(s): Hadise Açıkgöz, Yves Jongen, Sezen Aksu

Hadise singles chronology
| "My Man and the Devil on His Shoulder" (2008) | "Deli Oğlan" (2008) | "Aşkkolik" (2008) |

"Deli Oğlan" (En. Crazy Boy) is the fourth single, ninth overall, by Belgian-Turkish singer Hadise from her second self-titled studio album Hadise. The single is the Turkish version of her song A Good Kiss and is the first single to be released in Turkey only. The song has officially established Hadise as part of the Turkish music scene, as her previous singles didn't receive heavy plays on both radio and television, with the exception of "Stir me up" and "bad boy".

== Lyrics ==
The song was re-written in Turkish, by Turkish Pop legend Sezen Aksu, the Turkish version is entitled "Deli Oğlan", meaning "Crazy Boy".

== Music video ==
A music video was shot for the song, which differs from A Good Kiss. The video was shot in Turkey and was released on June 6, directed by Emir Khalilzadeh. Before the release pictures emerged online of the music video. The images showed Hadise in a dress with a male model hugging, the Turkish media made a fuss about the music video looking too erotic. However the male model scenes were cut from the final edit.

The music video's debut was on the music channel Powertürk.

== Chart performance ==
The song received substantial airplay on major radio stations, therefore charting on the radio charts. The song's music video aired on channels such as Powertürk, NR1 TV and TürkÇ. "Deli Oğlan" charted at 3 in its first week on the Official Billboard Türkçe Chart, jumping 95 places from 98 to 3 making it is one of the best success' ever. It was the highest debut on the chart that week, debuting higher than Serdar Ortaç's song "Nefes". This was the first time Hadise charted on the Official Billboard Türkçe Chart. Hadise charted on the Official Billboard Türkiye Chart, however differing between the charts are that the "Official Billboard Türkçe Chart" is where all Turkish songs feature, whereas "Official Billboard Türkiye Chart" is where all the foreign songs chart.

"Deli Oğlan" has becomes Hadise's best single, by peak position.

== Charts ==
| Chart (2008) | Peak position |
|---|---|
| Turkish Top 20 Chart (Official) | 3 |
