= Bad Boy (Hadise song) =

Single by Hadise

from the album Sweat
- B-side: "Su Halimi"
- Released: 14 August 2006 (Belgium)
- Genre: R&B, pop
- Label: EMI Belgium

Hadise singles chronology
"Ain't No Love Lost" (2006)	"Bad Boy" (2006)	"A Good Kiss" (2007)

Bad Boy Extra Cover

"Bad Boy" is the fifth and last single by Belgian-Turkish singer Hadise from her album Sweat - Special Edition.

"Bad Boy" was featured on the original version her debut album Sweat, however a remix was made which was released instead of the original.

== Music video ==
The music video for "Bad Boy" was shot on Gold Coast. The remix of "Bad Boy" was chosen for the video, instead of the original. The video sees Hadise performing on the beach and features many strange characters, i.e. a clown playing the sitar.

== Chart performance ==
Bad Boy entered the chart at #39 on 26 August. It was the second highest debut of the week behind friend Kate Ryan, with her song Alive. Bad Boy then dropped down two places a week later to #41. The song then gradually rose to its peak position of #22 in its fifth week. It then slowly began to drop off the chart, spending eleven weeks altogether on the chart.

== Charts ==
Chart (2006)	Peak position
Belgium Singles Top 50	22
Turkish Singles Chart	1

== Track listing ==
Belgium CD & iTunes download (Europe)

1. "Bad Boy (Radio Mix)" - 3:33
2. "Su halimi (Radio Edit)" - 3:21
