= Sweat (Hadise album) =

Studio album by Hadise
- Released: November 12, 2005 (Belgium)
- Recorded: 2006–2007
- Genre: R&B, pop
- Label: EMI
- Producer: Yves Jongen

Hadise chronology
Sweat (2005)	Hadise (2008)

Singles from Sweat
- 1. "Sweat" Released: 2004; 2. "Stir Me Up" Released: 2005; 3. "Milk Chocolate Girl" Released: 2005; 4. "Ain't No Love Lost" Released: 2006

Special Edition cover

Singles from Sweat - Special Edition
- 1. "Bad Boy (Radio Mix)" Released: 2006

Sweat is the debut studio album by Turkish-Belgian singer Hadise which was released in November 12, 2005. The album was released in both Belgium and Turkey. Hadise released 4 singles from this album - "Sweat", "Milk Chocolate Girl", "Ain't No Love Lost" and "Stir Me Up" - before releasing the single "Bad Boy (Remix)" which was supposed to be included on a re-release of the album that was eventually never released, for legal reasons.

== Legal battle ==
After the release of her debut album, Hadise was scheduled to release a special edition of "Sweat", however a legal battle between Hadise and her manager broke out and consequently postponed the release of the album. It was then expected to be released at the beginning of 2007, however this never happened.

== Track listing ==
=== Standard Edition ===
1. "Sweat" (featuring Raw Jawz)- 3:15
2. "Bad Boy" - 3:11
3. "When Ya Breathing On Me " - 3:23
4. "Jealous" - 3:14
5. "Ain't Doing It Right" - 3:50
6. "Milk Chocolate Girl" - 3:16
7. "Momma's Boy " - 3:25
8. "Never Trust A Man" - 3:21
9. "Sister" - 3:23
10. "Who Do You Believe" - 3:55
11. "Stir Me Up" - 3:26
12. "On The Beach" - 3:24
13. "Ain't No Love Lost" - 3:29
14. "Sakin Gitme" - 3:24

=== Sweat - Special Edition ===
(Disc 1)

1. Sweat (Radio Edit) - 03:14
2. Bad Boy (Radio Mix) - 03:33
3. When Ya Breathing On Me - 03:21
4. Jealous - 03:14
5. Ain't Doin' It Right - 03:49
6. Milk Chocolate Girl - 03:16
7. Momma's Boy - 03:23
8. Never Trust A Man - 03:19
9. Sister - 3:23
10. Who Do You Believe - 03:55
11. Stir Me Up - 03:26
12. On The Beach - 03:23
13. Ain't No Love Lost - 03:29
14. Sakin Gitme - 03:23
15. Su Halimi (Radio Edit) - 03:21
16. Burdayim - 03:33

(Disc 2)

1. Bad Boy (Basto! Loves Dub Mix) - 05:09
2. Bad Boy (E-Side Club Remix) - 03:26
3. Bad Boy (E-Side Oriental Remix) - 03:46
4. Stir Me Up (After Party Mix) - 04:05
5. Stir Me Up (Crunk Mix) - 04:15
6. Milk Chocolate Girl (Extended) - 05:49
7. Sweat (Nasty Mix) - 03:31
8. Sweat (Bubblin Mix) - 03:31
9. Bad Boy - Video
10. Stir Me Up - Video
11. Ain't No Love Lost - Video
12. Milk Chocolate Girl - Video

== Singles ==
On November 1, 2004, the first single "Sweat" was released in Belgium. Sweat debuted a month later on the Ultratop 50, entering at #38. It later rose to a peak of #25 before to descend for the next two weeks. In its tenth week, "Sweat" rose to a new peak of #19 and then fell off the chart five weeks later. Sweat spent a total of fourteen weeks on the chart.

The second single, "Stir Me Up", released on May 6, 2005, became another huge success especially in Turkey where the music video received much attention. On the Belgian Ultratop 50 chart, "Stir Me Up" spent a total of twelve weeks, peaking at #22.

The third single was "Milk Chocolate Girl", spent a total of 18 weeks on the Ultratop 50 singles chart, peaking at #13. "Milk Chocolate Girl" became the most successful single from the album "Sweat" and of Hadise's career until the release of "My Body".

"Ain't No Love Lost" was the fourth single, released January 13, 2006, becoming the least successful song of Hadise's career so far, only spending two weeks on the charts. It entered at 45 and then fell to 50, it then fell off the charts.

Hadise fourth single "Bad Boy", a remix, was released in late 2006 and became a huge hit all over Europe, making her one of the hottest new music artists on the continent. The video was shot on location on a beach in Belgium. It spent a total of eleven weeks on the Ultratop 50 chart and peaked at #22.

== Charts ==
Chart (2008)	Peak position
Belgium Ultratop Albums Chart	52
Top 20 Belgium Albums	17
Ultratop 50 Alternative Albums	26
