= Milk Chocolate Girl =

2005 R&B song by Hadise

Single by Hadise

from the album Sweat
- Released: October 9, 2005 (Belgium)
- Recorded: 2004
- Genre: Pop
- Label: 2Brains
- Songwriter(s): Hadise Açikgöz, Yves Jongen

Hadise singles chronology
"Stir Me Up" (2005)	"Milk Chocolate Girl" (2005)	"Ain't No Love Lost" (2006)

"Milk Chocolate Girl" is an English R&B song by Belgian-Turkish singer Hadise. It is the third single from her debut album Sweat and was the most successful song by Hadise, until the release of "My Body" in 2008 which debuted in a higher position than "Milk Chocolate Girl".

== Production ==
"Milk Chocolate Girl" was written by Hadise herself along with Yves Jongen. The song came about when Hadise was working on her debut album Sweat. She daily enjoyed a piece of chocolate to regain her strength, when one day she turned round to her producer and said "Chocolate is so delicious. I really couldn't do without it", her producer then replied "What's this infatuation women have with chocolate?" This comment, referring to the fact that women often say its better than sex contributed to the lyrics; "The sweet taste makes ya want to scream, A lot of woman say its better than ya know what I mean."

== Chart performance ==
"Milk Chocolate Girl" was the third single from Sweat released in Belgium. The song debuted on the Belgium Singles Top 50 at number twenty-six. It later peaked at Thirteen remaining on the chart for Eighteen weeks in total.

== Charts ==
Chart (2005/6)	Peak position
Belgium Singles Top 50	13

== Track listing ==
1. "Milk Chocolate Girl (Radio Edit)" - 3:17
2. "Milk Chocolate Girl (Extended)" - 5:49
3. "Ain't Doing It Right (Radio Edit)" - 3:52
