= Kahraman (album) =

Studio album by Hadise
- Released: June 19, 2009
- Recorded: 2008–2009
- Genre: R&B, electropop
- Producer: Sinan Akçıl, Yves Gaillard, Erdem Kınay, Volga Tamöz, Yannic Fonderie

Hadise chronology
Fast Life (2009)	Kahraman (2009)	Aşk Kaç Beden Giyer? (2011)

Singles from Kahraman
- 1. "Evlenmeliyiz" Released: July 2009; 2. "Kahraman" Released: February 2009

Kahraman (Hero) is the fourth studio album by Turkish-Belgian singer Hadise. It was released on June 19, 2009 and features the 2009 Eurovision song for Turkey, "Düm Tek Tek".

== Singles ==
- "Düm Tek Tek" was the lead single from Hadise's third album "Fast Life". It was released to Turkey on April 3, 2009, as an EP. The single was the Turkish entry for the Eurovision Song Contest 2009, and came fourth in the contest.
- "Evlenmeliyiz" ("We Should Get Married") is the official second single. It was released on 6 July, 2009.

== Track listing ==
#	Title	Writer(s)	Producer(s)	Time
1.	"Baksana"	Sinan Akçıl	Sinan Akçıl	3:23
2.	"Evlenmeliyiz"	Sinan Akçıl	Sinan Akçıl	3:12
3.	"Sıradan"^{1}	Sinan Akçıl	Sinan Akçıl	3:42
4.	"Kahraman"^{2}	Sinan Akçıl	Sinan Akçıl	3:37
5.	"Adın Ne"	M.T.	M.T.	3:28
6.	"Biraz Sabret"	Sinan Akçıl	Sinan Akçıl	3:49
7.	"Düm Tek Tek"	Hadise Açıkgöz, Sinan Akçıl, Stefan Fernande	Sinan Akçıl	3:05
8.	"Double Life"	Hadise Açıkgöz, Yves Jongen	Volga Tamöz	3:24
9.	"Supernatural Love"	Hadise Açıkgöz, Stefaan Fernande	Erdem Kınay	3:44
10.	"Baksana (R&B Version)"	Sinan Akçıl	Sinan Akçıl	3:24
11.	"Düm Tek Tek (Akustik)"	Hadise Açıkgöz, Sinan Akçıl, Stefan Fernande	Sinan Akçıl	3:05
12.	"Düm Tek Tek (Club Mix)"	Hadise Açıkgöz, Sinan Akçıl, Stefan Fernande	Suat Ateşdağlı, Yalçın Aşan	4:08
13.	"Kahraman (Akustik)"	Sinan Akçıl	Sinan Akçıl	4:28

1. Turkish Version of "On Top", featured on the album "Fast Life"
2. Turkish Version of "Hero", featured on the album "Fast Life"

== Release history ==
Region	Date	Label	Format
Turkey	June 19, 2009	Pasaj Müzik	Physical
Worldwide	August 7, 2009	"Mu-Yap"	Digital
