= Hadise (album) =

Studio album by Hadise
- Released: June 6, 2008
- Recorded: 2007–2008
- Genre: R&B, pop
- Label: EMI
- Producer: Yves Jongen

Hadise chronology
Sweat (2005)	Hadise (2008)	Fast Life (2009)

Singles from Hadise
- 1. "A Good Kiss" Released: September 3, 2007; 2. "My Body" Released: February 18, 2008; 3. "My Man and the Devil on His Shoulder" Released: June 6, 2008; 4. "Deli Oğlan" Released: June 6, 2008; 5. "Aşkkolik" Released: October 12, 2008

Hadise is the self-titled second studio album by Turkish-Belgian singer Hadise. The album has so far already produced 4 singles from the album, these include "My Body", "A Good Kiss", "Deli Oğlan" and "My Man and the Devil on His Shoulder". "My Body" has become Hadise's most successful single peaking at 8 on the Ultratop 50 chart (Flanders).

== Album title ==
Hadise was originally going to entitle the album On High Heels, referring to the fact that she has grown enormously in her professional career and knowledge. However, later changed the title to Hadise meaning an event or incident, as Hadise said the album is about "my story, my Hadise, my experiences, my feelings, my life, my thoughts in lyrics", saying she has "been through a lot" since her "first step in the music business".

== Production history ==
In an interview, Hadise also said she has been working on her new album since December/January 2007 and that the songs have been produced in several countries such as in June 2008. Hadise chose to take time out between her previous album and her forthcoming album to find more time with her family and to concentrate on songwriting.

On June 10, 2008, in an interview with Sibel Can on her summer talkshow "Sayısal Gece", Hadise revealed that she best records tracks when she is angry or upset. When she was asked to give an example, "Hadise" said that the track "Creep" was based on her anger towards her ex-manager.

== Release ==
The release date of the album was scheduled for March 28, 2008, however Hadise still hadn't shot the cover of the album and had flown back to Turkey to shoot the album cover delaying the release. The album was later released on June 6, 2008 in Belgium.

The album was released in Turkey in September 2008. It is said that Hadise would like to release the album in other countries.

== Promotion ==
In May 2008, Hadise travelled to Bodrum, in Turkey and performed several tracks from the upcoming album. These included "My Body", "Don't ask", "Deli Oğlan" and "Aşkkolik", to promote the album and its lead for Turkey, Deli Oğlan.

On June 6, the release of the album, Hadise appeared on Belgium radio station 'Donna' to promote the album.

On July 19, Hadise appeared on Sibel Can's summer talk show "Sayısal Gece" on TRT1, where she performed several songs both from her current album and previous album. Whilst on the show Hadise promised Sibel Can to record a duet together. She then appeared on İbrahim Tatlıses's talk show the "İbo Show", On July 20, to promote the album. Yet again Hadise performed several songs both from her current album and previous album. As well as singing a duet with İbrahim Tatlıses with the song "Mutlu Ol Yeter" and a solo effort of "Ah Askim"

== Singles ==
Hadise's first single from the album, it became the . "A Good Kiss" also was a success in Turkey " chart, peaking at 6. Hadise dedicated the single to all women, saying that a good kiss is very important for them (all women). She later released the Turkish version of the song, with a new music video and is titled Deli Oğlan, literally meaning "Crazy Boy".

Hadise's second single, My Body, became Hadise's best single, by peak position, peaking at number 8 on the "Ultra Top 50" chart. The video later become available on "Music on demand" in the U.K.

On July 6, 2008 Hadise released two singles, "My Man and the Devil on His Shoulder" in Belgium and "Deli Oğlan" in Turkey. Unlike Devil which is yet to chart on the Ultratop 50 chart, "Deli Oğlan" debuted on the Turkish Billboard chart at 3, previously being at 98, it is believed that this is the first time which a foreign artist, who usually sings in English, has charted on the Turkish chart. The song is currently receiving huge airplay topping numerous radio charts across Turkey, which has made Hadise even more popular and one of the most talked about artist at the moment.

== Track listing ==
=== Belgium CD track listings ===
Track	Title	Songwriter(s)	Producer(s)	Length
1	"Intro"	Hadise Açıkgöz	Yves Jongen	0:52
2	"My Man and the Devil on His Shoulder"	Hadise Açıkgöz, Yves Jongen	Hadise Açıkgöz, Yves Jongen	4:34
3	"My Body"	Hadise Açıkgöz	L. T. Hutton	3:14
4	"Prisoner"	Hadise Açıkgöz, Stefaan Fernande, Elio Deepcore	Hadise Açıkgöz, Stefaan Fernande, Elio Deepcore	3:52
5	"A Good Kiss"	Hadise Açıkgöz, Yves Jongen	Hadise Açıkgöz, Yves Jongen	3:29
6	"All Together"	Hadise Açıkgöz, Yves Jongen	Hadise Açıkgöz, Yves Jongen	3:07
7	"Men Chase Women Choose"	Hadise Açıkgöz, Yves Jongen	Hadise Açıkgöz, Yves Jongen	3:08
8	"Creep"	Hadise Açıkgöz, Stefaan Fernande, Stano Simor	Hadise Açıkgöz, Stefaan Fernande, Stano Simor	3:44
9	"Good Morning Baby"	Yves Jongen	Yves Jongen	4:16
10	"Don't Ask"	Hadise Açıkgöz, Yves Jongen	Hadise Açıkgöz, Yves Jongen	3:00
11	"Intimate"	Hadise Açıkgöz, Stefaan Fernande, Luca Chiaravall	Hadise Açıkgöz, Stefaan Fernande, Luca Chiaravall	3:37
12	"Busy Bee"	Hadise Açıkgöz, Yves Jongen	Hadise Açıkgöz, Yves Jongen	3:32
13	"Comfort Zone"	Hadise Açıkgöz, Yves Jongen	Hadise Açıkgöz, Yves Jongen	4:09
14	"Who Am I?"	Hadise Açıkgöz, Yves Jongen	Hadise Açıkgöz, Yves Jongen	3:14
15	"A Song For My Mother"	Hadise Açıkgöz, Stefaan Fernande, Luca Chiaravall	Hadise Açıkgöz, Stefaan Fernande, Luca Chiaravall	3:32
16	"Aşkkolik"	Deniz Erten	Özgür Buldum	3:30
17	"Deli Oğlan"	Sezen Aksu	Hadise Açıkgöz, Yves Jongen	3:12

=== Turkish CD track listings ===
The track listing for the Turkish CD of "Hadise" is as follows;

Track	Title	Songwriter(s)	Producer(s)	Length
1	"Intro"	Hadise Açıkgöz	Yves Jongen	0:52
2	"Deli Oğlan"	Sezen Aksu	Hadise Açıkgöz, Yves Jongen	3:12
3	"Aşkkolik"	Deniz Erten	Özgür Buldum	4:08
4	"My Man And The Devil On His Shoulder"	Hadise Açıkgöz, Yves Gallard	Hadise Açıkgöz, Yves Gallard	4:35
5	"My Body"	Hadise Açıkgöz, Yves Jongen	Yves Jongen	3:06
6	"Prisoner"	Hadise Açıkgöz, Stefaan Fernande, Elio Deepcore	Hadise Açıkgöz, Stefaan Fernande, Elio Deepcore	3:52
7	"A Good Kiss"	Hadise Açıkgöz, Yves Jongen	Hadise Açıkgöz, Yves Jongen	3:12
8	"All Together"	Hadise Açıkgöz, Yves Jongen	Hadise Açıkgöz, Yves Jongen	3:07
9	"Men Chase Women Choose"	Hadise Açıkgöz, Yves Jongen	Hadise Açıkgöz, Yves Jongen	3:08
10	"Creep"	Hadise Açıkgöz, Stefaan Fernande, Stano Simor	Hadise Açıkgöz, Stefaan Fernande, Stano Simor	3:44
11	"Good Morning Baby"	Yves Jongen	Yves Jongen	4:16
12	"Don't Ask"	Hadise Açıkgöz, Yves Jongen	Hadise Açıkgöz, Yves Jongen	3:00
13	"Intimate"	Hadise Açıkgöz, Stefaan Fernande, Luca Chiaravall	Hadise Açıkgöz, Stefaan Fernande, Luca Chiaravall	3:37
14	"Busy Bee"	Hadise Açıkgöz, Yves Jongen	Hadise Açıkgöz, Yves Jongen	3:32
15	"Comfort Zone"	Hadise Açıkgöz, Yves Jongen	Hadise Açıkgöz, Yves Jongen	4:09
16	"Who Am I?"	Hadise Açıkgöz, Yves Jongen	Hadise Açıkgöz, Yves Jongen	3:14
17	"A Song For My Mother"	Hadise Açıkgöz, Stefaan Fernande, Luca Chiaravall	Hadise Açıkgöz, Stefaan Fernande, Luca Chiaravall	3:32

== Release history ==
Region	Date	Format
Belgium	June 6, 2008	Physical
Europe	June 13, 2008	Digital
Turkey	September 24, 2008	Physical

== Releases ==
Belgium

- A Good Kiss
- My Body
- My Man and the Devil on His Shoulder

Turkey

- Deli Oğlan
- Aşkkolik

== Charts ==
Chart (2008)	Peak position
Belgium Ultratop Albums Chart	19
Top 20 Belgium Albums	6
Ultratop 50 Alternative Albums	13
D&R Online Music store	6
Esen Shop Online	4
