= Sweat (Hadise song) =

Single by Hadise

from the album Sweat
- Released: November 1, 2004 (Belgium)
- Recorded: 2004
- Genre: Pop

Hadise singles chronology
"Sweat" (2004)	"Stir Me Up" (2005)

"Sweat" is the first single by Belgian-Turkish singer Hadise from her debut album Sweat.

This single is the first by Hadise since entering Idool 2003. The song features up and comping rapper Raw Jaws.

== Chart performance ==
"Sweat" was the first single from Sweat released in Belgium. The song debuted on the Belgium Singles Top 50 at number 38. It later peaked at 19 remain on the chart for one week in total.

== Music video ==
This is the only release by Hadise not to have a music video. It is said that there was no music video on purpose, so that the song could stay a little more mysterious. However music channels in Belgium, such as JIMtv, played the video of Hadise's performance at the SIMS-awards.

== Charts ==
Chart (2004)	Peak position
Belgium Singles Top 50	19
