= Şampiyon =

Studio album by Hadise
- Released: 29 June 2017
- Genre: Pop
- Label: Pasaj
- Producer: Hadise Açıkgöz · Hülya Açıkgöz

Hadise chronology
Tavsiye (2014)	Şampiyon (2017)	Aşka Kapandım (2021)

Şampiyon (Champion) is the seventh studio album by Turkish-Belgian singer Hadise. It was released on 29 June 2017 by Pasaj Müzik. The album's first music video was released for the song "Şampiyon", and the song itself ranked second on the MusicTopTR Fastest Rising Chart in Turkey. Three other music videos were later released for the songs "Sıfır Tolerans", "Farkımız Var" and "Aşk Dediğin" respectively. Out of these songs, "Sıfır Tolerans" topped Turkey's official music chart while "Farkımız Var" rose to the sixth position. The music video for "Sıfır Tolerans" was later described as erotic by the Radio and Television Supreme Council and, as a result, the channels that had broadcast it were fined. Hadise, who described this decision as an act of patriarchy and sexism, commented on the issue by saying: "Our male artists have had numerous scenes with actresses/models and they do not fall into the category of 'erotic' at all. As a woman, do I have to submit to this? No. 'He's a man so he does whatever he likes, she's a woman so she stays quiet' I will fight with this mindset until the end". The music video for "Farkımız Var" received the Best Music Video award at the 45th Golden Butterfly Awards.

== Track listing ==
No.	Title	Writer(s)	Composer(s)	Length
1.	"Farkımız Var"	Gökhan Şahin	Emrah Karaduman	3:24
2.	"Telefon Rehberi"	Zeki Güner	Zeki Güner	2:51
3.	"Sıfır Tolerans"	Nehir Kıyıcı	Metehan Köseoğlu	3:47
4.	"Aşk Dediğin"	Zeki Güner	Zeki Güner	3:33
5.	"Rezerve"	Gökhan Şahin	Gökhan Şahin	3:06
6.	"Kafa Tutuyor"	Gökhan Şahin	Gökhan Şahin	3:12
7.	"Şampiyon"	Alper Narman · Onur Özdemir	Alper Narman · Onur Özdemir	4:07
8.	"Sıfır Tolerans" (Mahmut Orhan Remix)	Nehir Kıyıcı	Metehan Köseoğlu	4:57
9.	"Şampiyon" (Gürcell Remix)	Alper Narman · Onur Özdemir	Alper Narman · Onur Özdemir	3:46
Total length:				44:00

== Personnel ==
- Production: Pasaj Müzik
- Producers: Hadise Açıkgöz, Hülya Açıkgöz
- General Coordinator: Hülya Açıkgöz
- Supervisor: İskender Paydaş
- Musical Assistant: Bilge Miraç Atıcı
- Vocal Coach: Youssef Chellak
- Vocal Recording: Barış Erduran
- Photographs: Emre Ünal
- Styling Consultant: Derya Açıkgöz
- Hair Stylist: Serkan Aktürk
- Make-up: Ali Rıza Özdemir
- Nail Art: Ebru Pırıl
- Design: Erhan Karadeniz
- Printing: Frs

== Charts ==
Chart (2017)	Peak position
Belgium (Ultratop)	171
