= Tavsiye =

Studio album by Hadise
- Released: 4 August 2014
- Genre: Pop
- Length: 44:00
- Label: Pasaj
- Producer: Hadise Açıkgöz · Hülya Açıkgöz

Hadise chronology
Aşk Kaç Beden Giyer? (2011)	Tavsiye (2014)	Şampiyon (2017)

Tavsiye (Advice) is the sixth studio album by Turkish-Belgian singer Hadise. It was released on 4 August 2014 by Pasaj Müzik. When questioned about the title of the album Hadise said that she had a song with the same title and she felt that the collection of songs on the album contained advice for women, hence she chose this title. The lead single, "Nerdesin Aşkım", was titled based on a sentence used by Cem Yılmaz in CM101MMXI Fundamentals, which was used in the chorus of the song ("Nerdesin aşkım? Burdayım aşkım! (Where are you my love? I'm here my love!)"). The music and lyrics of the song were provided by Alper Narman and Onur Özdemir, the arrangement was done by İskender Paydaş, and Hülya Açıkgöz directed the music video, which was released on 31 July 2014. The second single from the album was "Prenses". This music video was also directed by Hülya Açıkgöz. Music videos for the songs "Yaz Günü" and "Bu Aralar" were released in 2015 and 2016 respectively, the latter of which was shot in Dominican Republic. "Nerdesin Aşkım?" and "Bu Aralar" both ranked first on Turkey's official music chart.

== Track listing ==
No.	Title	Writer(s)	Composer(s)	Length
1.	"Yaz Günü"	Selim Siyami Sümer	Selim Siyami Sümer	3:37
2.	"Nerdesin Aşkım"	Alper Narman • Onur Özdemir	Alper Narman • Onur Özdemir	3:11
3.	"Prenses"	Gökhan Şahin	Emrah Karaduman	3:55
4.	"Bu Aralar"	Özlem Argon	Özlem Argon • Reşit Gözdamla	4:36
5.	"Tokat"	Alper Narman · Onur Özdemir	Alper Narman · Onur Özdemir	3:46
6.	"İstisna"	Selahattin Erhan	Selahattin Erhan	4:34
7.	"Çok Yaşa"	İsra Gülümser	Tolga Görsev	4:11
8.	"Tavsiye"	İsra Gülümser	İsra Gülümser	4:14
9.	"Yolumun Işığı"	Özlem Argon	Özlem Argon	3:32
10.	"Tavsiye" (Street Fabulous Remix)	İsra Gülümser	Gianluca Presti "So Lound" & Cem Ozan Aktas "Oz Touch"	3:36
11.	"Yaz Günü" (Street Fabulous Remix)	Selim Siyami Sümer	P.Kasperski	4:48
Total length:				44:00

== Personnel ==
- Production: Pasaj Müzik
- Producers: Hadise Açıkgöz, Hülya Açıkgöz
- General Coordinator: Hülya Açıkgöz
- Supervisor: İskender Paydaş
- Musical Assistant: Bilge Miraç Atıcı
- Vocal Coach: Youssef Chellak
- Vocal Recording: Barış Erduran
- Photographs: Emre Ünal
- Style Consultant: Derya Açıkgöz
- Hair Stylist: Serkan Aktürk
- Make-up: Ali Rıza Özdemir
- Nail Art: Ebru Pırıl
- Design: Erhan Karadeniz
- Printing: Frs

== Sales ==
Country	Sales
Turkey (MÜ-YAP)	16,000
