= Stir Me Up =

Single by Hadise

from the album Sweat
- Released: May 6, 2005 (Belgium)
- Recorded: 2004
- Genre: Pop
- Length: 3:26
- Label: EMI
- Songwriter(s): Hadise Açıkgöz, Yves Jongen
- Producer(s): Leroy Chambers, D. Meezee and Mo Benjamin

Hadise singles chronology
"Sweat" (2004)	"Stir Me Up" (2005)	"Milk Chocolate Girl" (2005)

"Stir Me Up" is an English R&B song by Belgian-Turkish singer Hadise from her debut album Sweat. It was her first single to receive airplay in Turkey. The song reflects on her Turkish background and part of the song is in Turkish. It was heavily played throughout Turkey establishing Hadise as a successful artist.

== Music video ==
The music video for "Stir Me Up" starts off with the camera, presumably being the helicopter flying across a city. The camera then flies into an arena where Hadise is performing the song. Hadise is then seen on a billboard, which shows her performing in a caged cube being watched by a security camera.

== Charts ==
Chart (2004/5)	Peak position
Belgium Singles Top 50	22
Turkish Singles Chart	2

== Track listing ==
CD listing:

1. "Stir me up (Radio edit)"
2. "Stir me up (After Party remix)"

Vinyl listing:

- A1 - "Stir Me Up (After Party Remix)" - 4:05
- A2 - "Stir Me Up (Radio Edit)" - 3:28
- B1 - "Stir Me Up (Crunk Mix)" - 4:15
- B2 - "Sweat (Nasty Remix)" - 3:31
- B3 - "Stir Me Up (DJ Tools)" - 4:00
