= Düm Tek Tek =

2009 song by Hadise

Single by Hadise

from the album Fast Life
- Released: 1 January 2009; 9 April 2009 (Turkish EP); 25 May 2009 (Netherlands)
- Recorded: 2008
- Genre: Pop; dance-pop; folk-pop
- Length: 3:02; 17:00 (Turkish EP)
- Label: EMI Belgium; Pasaj Müzik (Turkish EP); EMI/Virgin (Netherlands)
- Composer: Sinan Akçıl
- Lyricists: Sinan Akçıl; Hadise Açıkgöz; Stefan Fernande
- Producer: Sinan Akçıl

Hadise singles chronology
"Aşkkolik" (2008)	"Düm Tek Tek" (2009)	"Fast Life" (2009)

Music video
- "Düm Tek Tek" on YouTube

Alternative cover
- Turkish EP Cover

Alternative cover
- Japanese Single Cover

Eurovision Song Contest 2009 entry
- Country: Turkey
- Artist: Hadise Açıkgöz
- As: Hadise
- Language: English
- Composer: Sinan Akçıl
- Lyricists: Sinan Akçıl; Hadise Açıkgöz; Stefan Fernande

Finals performance
- Semi-final result: 2nd
- Semi-final points: 172
- Final result: 4th
- Final points: 177

Entry chronology
- ◄ "Deli" (2008)
- "We Could Be the Same" (2010) ►

Official performance video
- "Düm Tek Tek" (Final) on YouTube

"Düm Tek Tek" is a song by Belgian-Turkish singer Hadise with music composed by Sinan Akçıl and lyrics written by Akçıl, Hadise, and Stefan Fernande. It represented Turkey in the Eurovision Song Contest 2009 held in Moscow.

"Düm Tek Tek" entered in Belgium the Ultratop 50 (Flanders) at 36, where it stayed for a week before dropping out of the charts. It briefly became number one, defeating "Poker Face" by Lady Gaga. It also entered the Ultratop 50 (Wallonia) at 27, marking Hadise's first appearance on any Walloon chart.

== Background ==
=== Conception ===
The lyrics of "Düm Tek Tek" were written by Hadise, Sinan Akçıl and Stefaan Fernande, while the music was composed by Akçıl. The song resembles the previous Eurovision winning Turkish song "Everyway That I Can", in the sense that both are up-tempo songs with a "Turkish flavor" –though the lyrics suggest it is a love song–. The song itself is performed in English, with the hook being in Turkish. "Düm tek tek" is a phrase formed by the Turkish music instrument darbuka, so it cannot readily be translated into other languages, though it has been said that "boom bang bang" is one English equivalent. It has been described as a "rhythmic pattern of Turkish music which is similar to vals in western music". In the song, "düm tek tek" are words symbolizing heartbeats:

Can you feel the rhythm in my heart? The beat's going Düm Tek Tek!

=== Selection and release ===
On 21 October 2008, the Turkish Radio and Television Corporation (TRT) announced that it had internally selected Hadise as its performer for the 54th edition of the Eurovision Song Contest. Hadise prepared three songs and submitted them to TRT for consideration. On the eve of 1 January 2009, "Düm Tek Tek" was presented to the public during TRT's New Year's Eve television special as the Turkish entrant for Eurovision.

=== Promotion tour ===
Hadise started off her promo tour in Malta, appearing on five television shows including the National Final where "What If We" by Chiara was chosen for Eurovision. Her second destination was the Greek National Final where "This Is Our Night" by Sakis Rouvas was chosen for Eurovision. Then she started her Balkan tour in Komotini, Greece, followed by Skopje, Macedonia. She also visited Albania, Montenegro, Bulgaria, Romania, and Moldova.

=== Music video ===
Hadise in "Düm Tek Tek" video.

During the month of March, a music video for "Düm Tek Tek" was shot. Snippets of the "Düm Tek Tek" video were shown during news broadcasts on VRT and Vtm, in Belgium, showing Hadise dancing within flame-like figures. The version of the song featured in the music video differs to the original as it has a new, more lively beat. The music video was edited in several ways, resulting in three different versions of the video being presented to TRT; one of the three was later leaked on the internet. The selected music video for "Düm Tek Tek" was set to premiere during the TRT news on 15 March however, the video release was postponed as it was said TRT was unable to decide; TRT finally sent to the European Broadcasting Union (EBU) the performance on the New Year's Eve show as its promo video.

==== Controversy ====
When the music video for "Dum Tek Tek" was leaked on the internet, it was labelled as being too erotic, and was thought to be the reason why TRT did not release it, however Hadise's manager Süheyl Atay denied these claims and was quoted as saying: "TRT has no attitudes or enforcements restricting the productivity of the artist like it has never had up to now. The claims appearing on the Turkish press since 22 March 2009 do not reflect the reality." Atay said that the montage process of the clip was still going on and the clip asserted to be the official one was only one of the three clip samples being delivered to TRT. "As can be understood from the quality of the images, the clip is not the final official version of the video clip. The process is going on, and the real clip will be made public by TRT as soon as possible."

=== Eurovision ===
On 12 May 2009, the first semi-final of the Eurovision Song Contest was held in the Olimpiysky Arena in Moscow hosted by Channel One (C1R) and broadcast live throughout the continent. Hadise performed "Düm Tek Tek" ninth on the evening, following Switzerland's "The Highest Heights" by Lovebugs and preceding Israel's "There Must Be Another Way" by Noa and Mira Awad. The song qualified for the grand final. After the grand final it was revealed that it had received in its semi-final 172 points, placing second. In a reaction to the first semi-final, Hadise said it is a miracle that she made it to the final as she was sick. In reaction to her birth country Belgium not making it to the final, she said that she represented both countries (Turkey and Belgium) and that she always felt a sense of belonging to both.

On 16 May 2009, the grand final for the Eurovision Song Contest was held. Hadise performed "Düm Tek Tek" again eighteen on the evening, following Germany's "Miss Kiss Kiss Bang" by Alex Swings Oscar Sings! and preceding Albania's "Carry Me in Your Dreams" by Kejsi Tola.

At the end of voting, the song finished placing fourth with 177 points overall.

== Track listings ==
- Belgian – Single
1. "Düm Tek Tek" – 3:02
- Turkish – EP
1. "Düm Tek Tek" – 3:03
2. "Deli Oğlan" – 3:11
3. "Stir Me Up" – 3:28
4. "Aşkkolik" – 4:05
5. "A Good Kiss" – 3:11
- Japanese – EP
1. "Düm Tek Tek" – 3:02
2. "My Body (Radio Edit)" – 3:07
3. "Düm Tek Tek (Club Mix)" – 4:02
4. "My Body (Lotion Remix)" – 5:03

== Release history ==
Region	Date	Label	Format
Turkey	1 January 2009	Pasaj Müzik	Radio single
Turkey	9 April 2009	Pasaj Müzik	EP
Belgium	9 March 2009	EMI Belgium	Radio single
Belgium	30 March 2009	EMI Belgium	CD single
Netherlands	25 May 2009	EMI	CD single
Japan	5 August 2009	EMI Japan	CD single

== Chart performance ==
"Düm Tek Tek" topped the Flemish Chart in Belgium and stayed at the top for three weeks, spending a total of 12 weeks on the chart. Also in Wallonia the song reached number #24 and stayed on the charts for five weeks. In the Greek Billboard Chart, the song spent 8 weeks on the chart, peaking at #2. The song was also successful in Scandinavia. It charted in Swedish Singles Chart and reached #12, in the Finnish Official Download Chart it peaked at #29. The song also reached 70 in the German Singles Chart, #73 in the Swiss Singles Chart, and #99 in the Dutch Singles Chart. In Russia, the song started rotation on 28 May, and peaked at #400 on its first day, consequently it reached #251. The song also entered the UK Singles Chart on 30 May, with a peak position of #127. Due to the popularity of the song in the European countries' charts, the song succeeded to chart in Eurochart Hot 100 Singles and peaked there at #64. "Düm Tek Tek" has not charted in the Turkish Charts yet. The song is playing on both the radios which play Turkish music and foreign music. So the song's charted list is unknown.

After Eurovision, "Düm Tek Tek" gained popularity on iTunes across Europe, in countries such as Denmark, France, Germany, Luxembourg, the Netherlands, Norway and the United Kingdom, where the song entered the iTunes Top 100.

The ringtone of "Düm Tek Tek" already was a smash hit in Japan. On 5 August Hadise's Eurovision Song Contest entry was also released on single in Japan. EMI Music Japan released a TV commercial and a Japanese Hadise website to promote the Belgian-Turkish singer, which made the song a hit in the Japanese charts. The ringtone charts in Japan had already proved that the sound of "Düm Tek Tek" appealed to Japanese public.

=== Weekly charts ===
Chart (2009)	Peak position
Belgium (Ultratop 50 Flanders)	1
Belgium (Ultratop 50 Wallonia)	24
ERROR in "CIS": Invalid position: 251. Expected number 1–200 or dash (–).
Europe (Eurochart Hot 100 Singles)	64
Finland (Finnish Singles Chart)	29
Germany (GfK)	70
Japan (Japan Hot 100)	21
Japan (Japan Top Airplay)	16
Japan (Japan Adult Contemporary Airplay)	27
Netherlands (Single Top 100)	99
Sweden (Sverigetopplistan)	12
Switzerland (Schweizer Hitparade)	73
Turkey (Türkiye Single Top 100)	1
United Kingdom (UK Singles Chart)	127

== Legacy ==
A cover version in Afrikaans was released in South Africa by Andriette.
