= Hadise =

Belgian-born Turkish singer (born 1985)

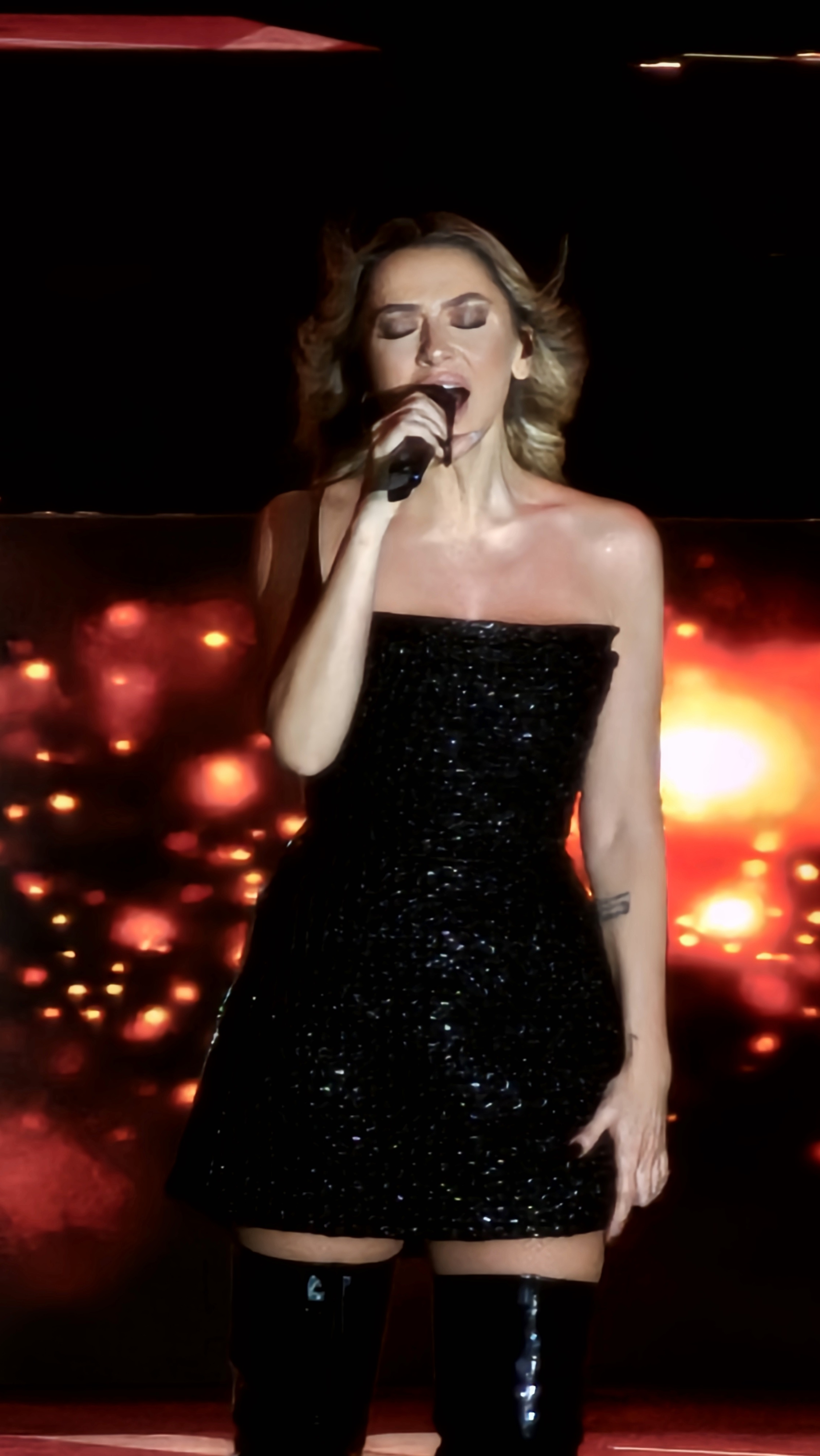
- Hadise in 2023
- Born: Hadise Açıkgöz; 21 October 1985 (age 41); Mol, Belgium
- Citizenship: Belgium; Turkey
- Occupations: Singer; songwriter; television presenter; dancer
- Spouse: Mehmet Dinçerler (m. 2022; div. 2022)
- Musical career
- Genres: Pop; R&B; electropop
- Instrument: Vocals
- Years active: 2003–present
- Labels: EMI; Capitol; Seyhan Muzik; Diapason; Pasaj
- Website: hadise.com

Hadise Açıkgöz (born 21 October 1985) is a Belgian-born Turkish singer, songwriter, dancer and television personality. Born and raised in Belgium, her family is of Lezgin-Kumyk origin who settled in Sivas, Turkey. In 2003, she participated in the Belgian singing competition show Idool 2003, but rose to fame after releasing her debut album Sweat in 2005. The album spawned 5 singles and earned Hadise both a TMF Award (Belgium) and Golden Butterfly Award (Turkey). Hadise established and maintained a successful career in both Belgium and Turkey with the release of her self-titled album Hadise (2008). The album, which includes English and Turkish songs, features the single "Deli Oğlan" that became a number-one hit in Turkey.

In 2009, Hadise represented Turkey at the Eurovision Song Contest with the song "Düm Tek Tek". The song gained a total of 177 points, placing Turkey fourth in the final round of the competition. "Düm Tek Tek" earned Hadise her first number one single in Belgium and was followed-up with the release of her studio albums Fast Life, (2009) and Kahraman (2009). The single "Evlenmeliyiz" from Kahraman was among the top-ten hits on Türkçe Top 20. She has since focused on her career in Turkey with the release of her albums Aşk Kaç Beden Giyer? (2011), Tavsiye (2014) and Şampiyon (2017).

Aside from her musical accomplishments Hadise also presented the Belgian version of The X Factor and has been a judge on O Ses Türkiye (Turkish version of The Voice) since 2011.

== Early life ==
Hadise Açıkgöz was born in the town of Mol, located near the city of Antwerp, on 21 October 1985. Her name was chosen by one of her grandparents, having originally been intended for her older sister. Hadise's parents emigrated to Belgium from Sivas, Turkey. Her mother, Gülnihal, is Kumyk and her father, Hasan Açıkgöz, is Lezgin. She grew up with her older sister, Hülya, a younger sister Derya and also a younger brother named Murat. Hadise was 11 years old when her parents divorced.

At the age of 18 and with the support of her family, Hadise participated in the first season of the show Idool, the Flemish version of the Pop Idol series. She failed to qualify for the finals; however, her appearance was acknowledged by her soon-to-be manager Johan Hendrickx. Hendrickx contacted Hadise explaining how impressed he was with her performance on the show and offered her an album contract.

== Music career ==
=== 2004–08: Sweat and Hadise ===
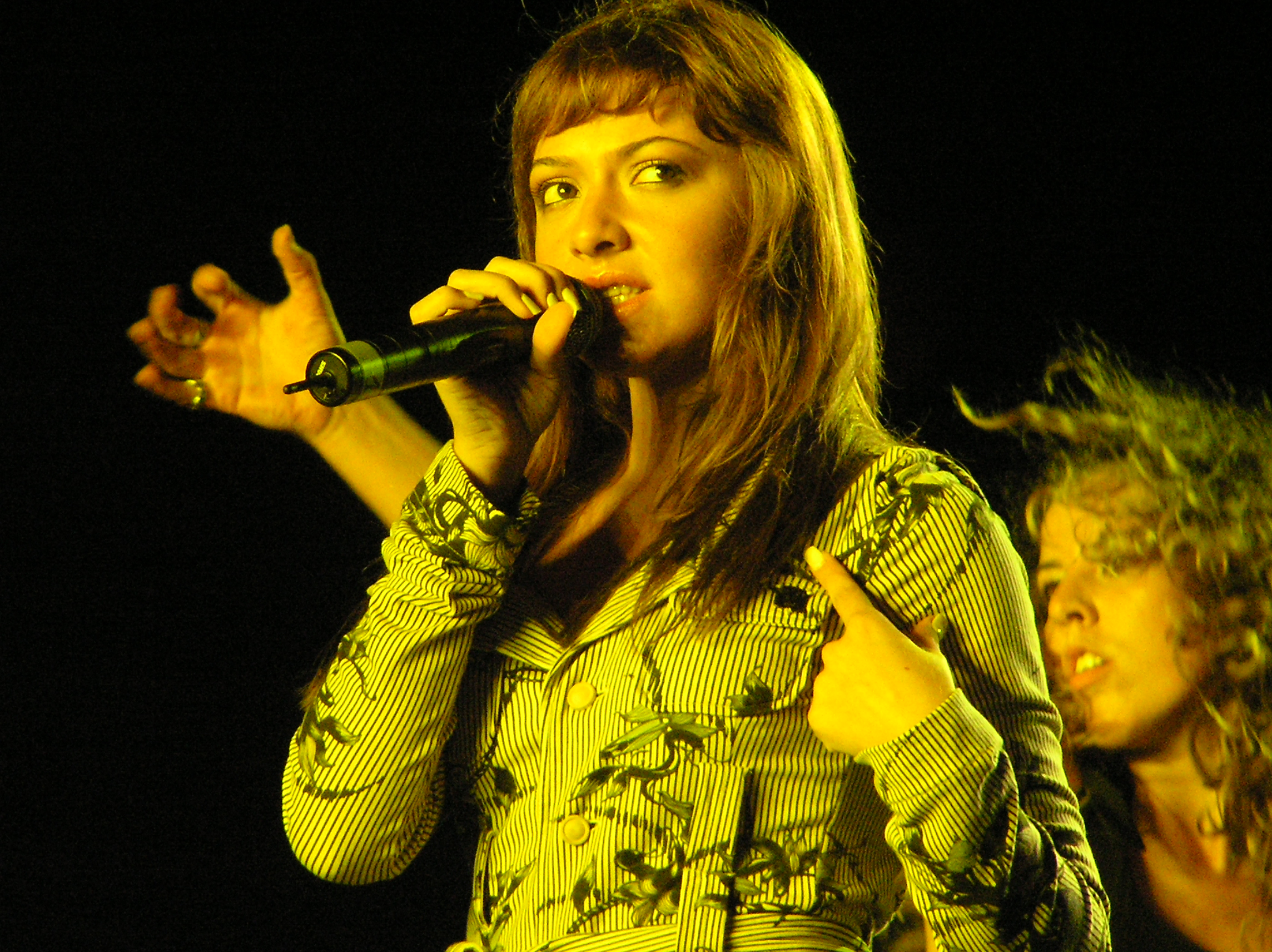
Hadise performing in Antwerp, August 2006

After signing to 2 Brain records, Hadise recorded her debut single "Sweat", which was released in November 2004. Although a music video wasn't shot for the single, the song managed to peak at No. 19 on the Ultratop 50 singles chart. She later released the single "Stir Me Up" which gained popularity in both Belgium and especially Turkey, where the song became a huge hit in the summer of 2006. Hadise then released her single "Milk Chocolate Girl", the biggest hit from her debut album, which peaked at No. 13 on the Ultratop 50. A year after releasing her debut single, in November 2005, her first studio album Sweat was released with about half of the songs being written by Hadise herself. The album notably included the singles "Ain't No Love Lost" and "Bad Boy". "Bad Boy" peaked at No. 22 on the Ultratop.

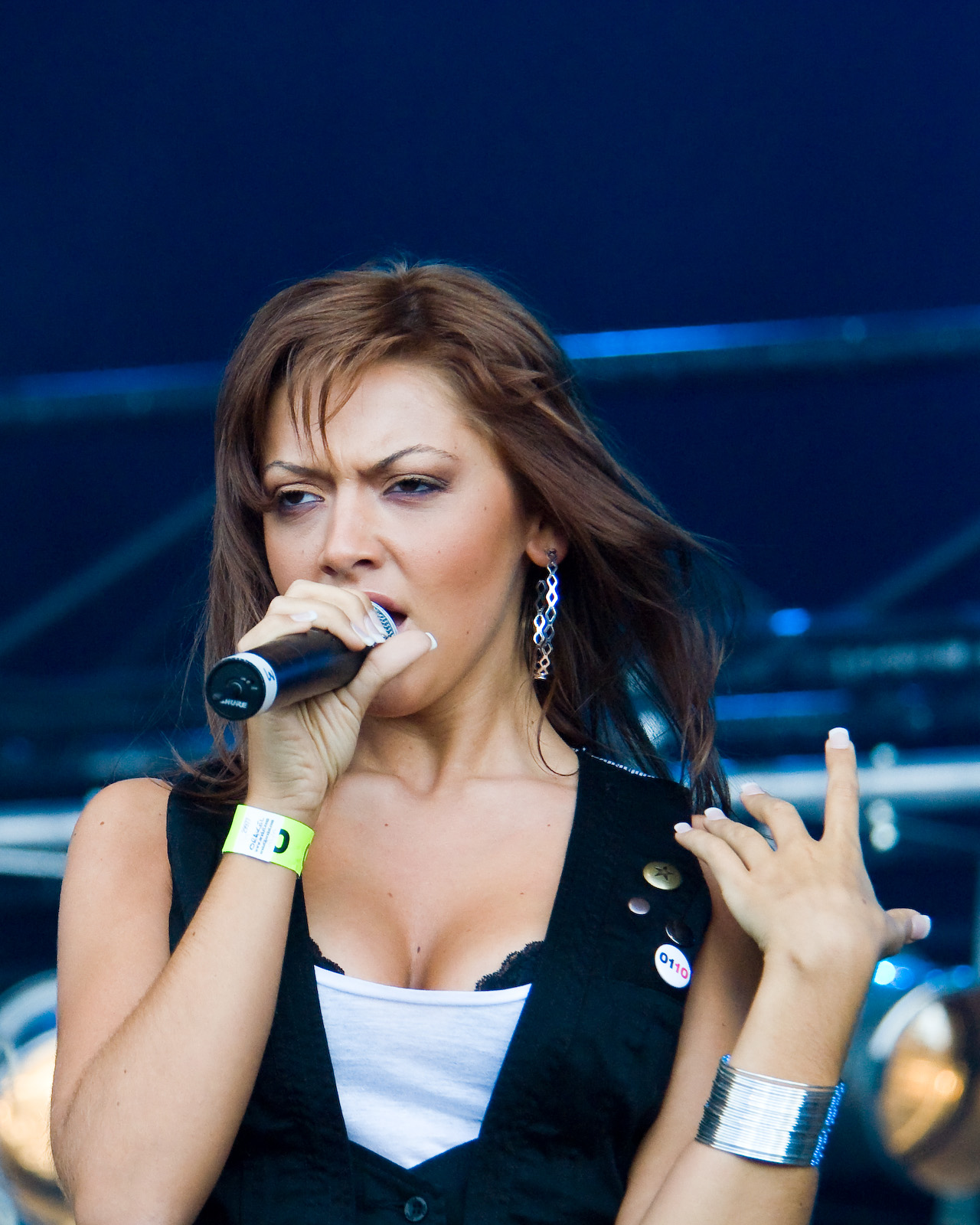
Hadise performing in Ghent, Belgium, in November 2006

The self-titled album, was originally intended to be named On High Heels, referring to the fact that she had grown enormously in her professional career and knowledge. Hadise began to work on her second studio album in December 2007. The album was recorded in several countries, including Belgium, France, Turkey and Italy. The lead single, "A Good Kiss", was released in September 2007. This became her sixth consecutive single to chart on the Belgian "Ultratop 50". The song was also successful in Turkey, where it became her first single to chart on the "Turkish Billboard Chart". The song was later translated into Turkish by Sezen Aksu as "Deli Oğlan", and it became one of the most played songs in clubs in the summer of 2008. In Turkish, subsequently the single managed to peak at 3 on the Turkish Charts. Due to leaked images of Hadise being affectionate with a male model, the music video "Deli Oğlan" generated controversy amongst those who considered the images to be 'racy' or 'erotic'. Hadise later removed these scenes from the video.

Hadise released two more singles in Belgium "My Body", which was her best-selling single in Belgium (until the release of "Düm Tek Tek") and "My Man and the Devil on His Shoulder", her first single to not chart on the Ultratop 50 chart. Also the song "My Body" became popular in the Balkan countries and started airing at the Bulgarian Balkanika TV's playlist.

Hadise, which was released in June 2008, has become the most successful album of Hadise's career so far, as it was the first album to enter the Belgium Album chart, at 19. It was the first album of Hadise to be released onto iTunes. She co-wrote ten of the album's songs with Yves Gaillard.

In June 2008, Hadise appeared on Serdar Ortaç's album Nefes on a track called "Düşman". In July 2008, Hadise revealed that she had met Kevin Federline during her trip to the United States and told the media that he had produced some music for her to use on a future album. A new video had surfaced of Hadise telling Belgian viewers that her future album would include urban beats along with some of the producers and choreographers had worked with Britney Spears, Justin Timberlake, Alicia Keys, and many more artists that are big in the game. In August 2008, she was nominated as the Best Turkish Act on MTV Europe Music Awards but lost to Emre Aydın.

=== 2009–10: Eurovision Song Contest, Fast Life and Kahraman ===
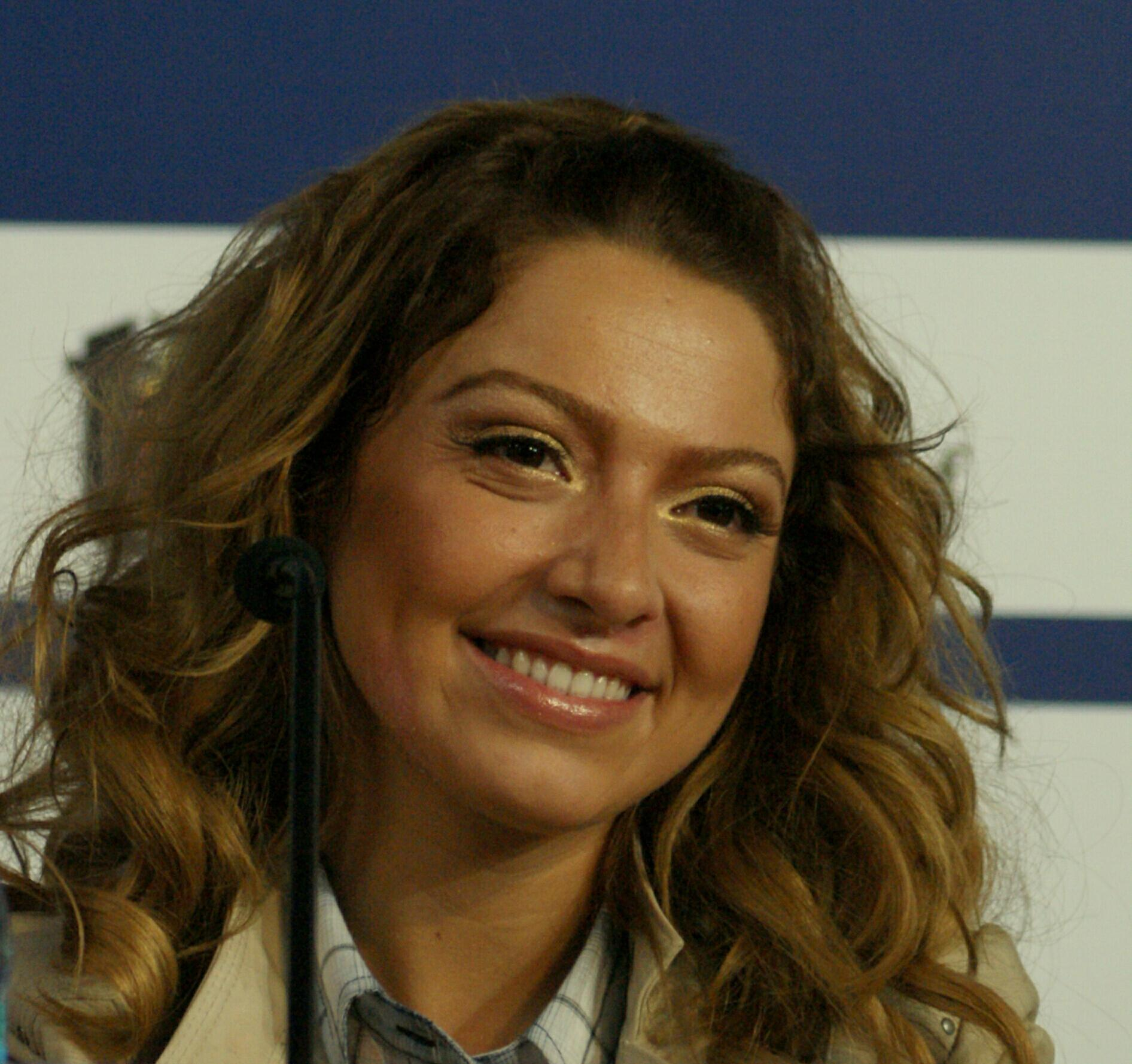
Hadise at a press conference for Eurovision Song Contest 2009 in Moscow

In 2007, Hadise stated that she would never take part in the Eurovision Song Contest after her best friend Kate Ryan, who represented Belgium, failed to qualify for the final round of the contest. A year later in 2008, Hadise expressed her desire to participate in the contest representing Turkey instead of Belgium. She was asked twice by the Belgian broadcasters to represent Belgium but each time she refused the offer. She told Belgian newspapers she wanted to represent Turkey instead of Belgium because she had already won many Belgian awards and also because the Eurovision Song Contest wasn't popular in Belgium anymore, whereas it was in Turkey. She also said that she preferred to represent Turkey as it was an internal selection rather than a public voting.

The rumors of Hadise's participation at Eurovision on behalf of Turkey first surfaced in 2007. On 24 October 2008, İbrahim Şahin, the general manager of Turkish broadcaster TRT, announced that Hadise had won an official poll beating out the likes of Şebnem Ferah to represent Turkey as the 2009 participant at the 54th Eurovision Song Contest.

It was revealed that Hadise had complete control over the production of the song and was in charge of deciding the lyricist, composer, producer and the language of the song. It was later revealed by the Turkish newspaper Sabah, that Hadise had presented three songs to TRT, who then chose the entry internally. On 31 December 2008, Hadise performed the song "Düm Tek Tek" for the first time on TRT. The song, which was the final choice for the competition, was written by Stefan Fernande and produced by Sinan Akçıl. The official music video for "Düm Tek Tek" was later leaked online. For promoting the song she traveled to countries such as Greece, Malta, Romania, Bosnia and Herzegovina, and Bulgaria. Meanwhile, she was dealing with some health issues. On 16 May 2009, Hadise performed "Düm Tek Tek" in the Russian capital, Moscow, and received points from Azerbaijan, Belgium, United Kingdom, France, Switzerland and Macedonia. With 177 points in total, Turkey earned the fourth place behind Norway, Iceland and Azerbaijan.

Hadise then began working on her third studio album, titled Fast Life, which she first revealed on her official MySpace page, during her preparation for the Eurovision Song Contest. The album was released on 15 May 2009, a day prior to the Eurovision final. This was the first album from her to contain all English tracks. It featured her Eurovision entry "Düm Tek Tek" along with the two other songs she penned to TRT to enter the Eurovision Song Contest with. These were "Double Life" and "Supernatural Love". "Düm Tek Tek" became Hadise's first number one single in Belgium. The album became number 1 on Indonesia Music Lists and ranked at number 16 on Belgium Music Lists. She then released the single "Fast Life", which she stated was based on her lifestyle during her Eurovision experience. The single was released on 15 June 2009 along with a music video, and won an award as the Best Turkish Song at Balkan Music Awards.

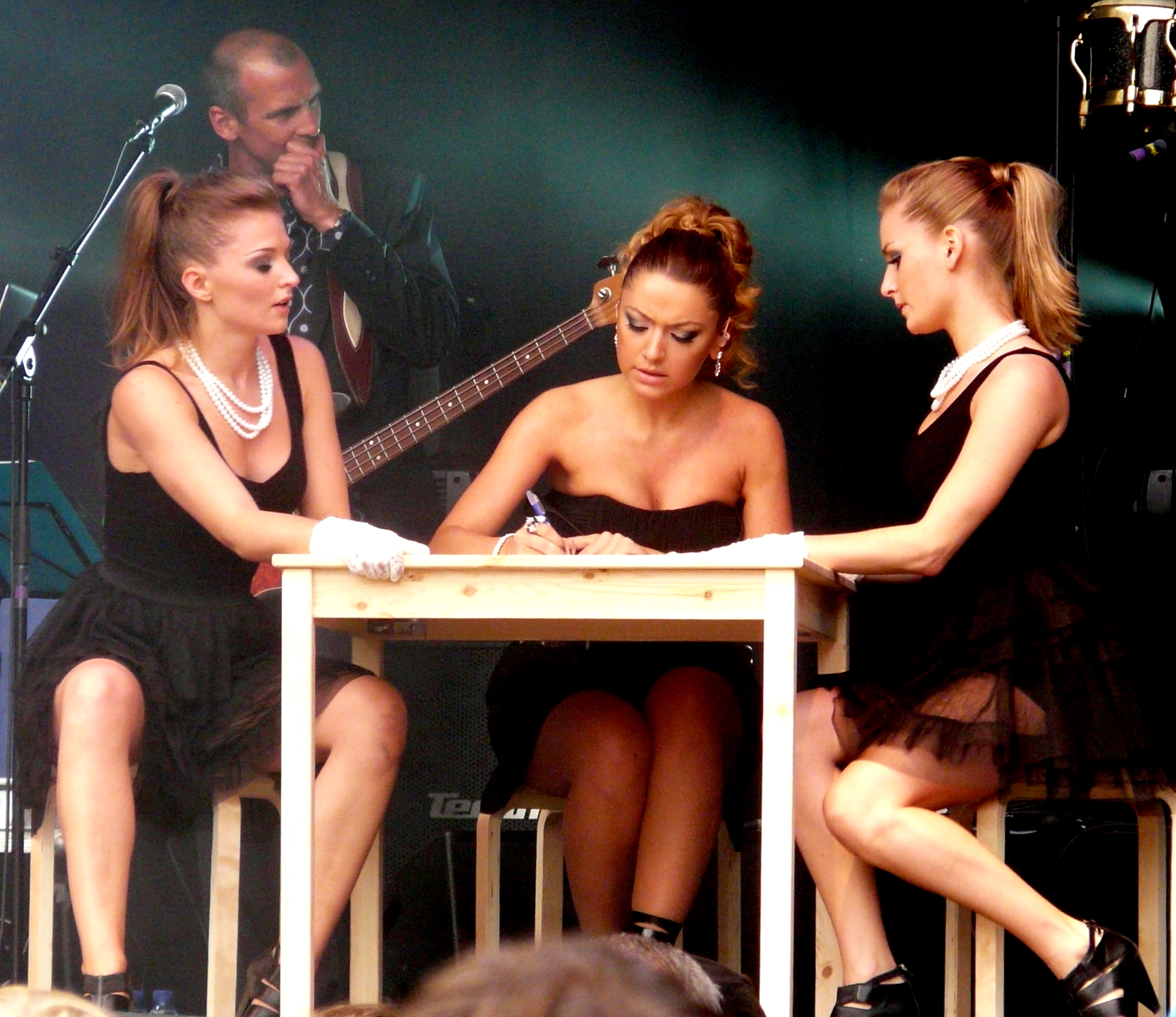
Hadise (center) performing an autobiographical song during a concert in Mechelen, August 2009

Just over a month after the release of Fast Life, Hadise officially released her first Turkish-language album, called Kahraman, on 19 June 2009. She again collaborated with producer Sinan Akçıl, the producer of her Eurovision entry song "Düm Tek Tek" Volga Tamöz and Erdem Kınay also helped working on some tracks. Hadise described the album as a personal piece. Like her album Fast Life, this album also features Hadise's Eurovision entry "Düm Tek Tek", along with the other two possible songs, "Double Life" and "Supernatural Love", which were presented to TRT. The tracks "Sirada" and "Kahraman" are the Turkish translation of Hadise's songs, from her album Fast Life, "On Top" and "Hero" respectively. "Evlenmeliyiz" (Turkish for "We Should Get Married") was released as the lead single in July 2009, and reached the top 40 in Turkey. It was the second Turkish single from Hadise to have a music video. It was directed by Emir Khalilzadeh. A music video for the single "Kahraman" was also directed by Şenol Korkmaz and released as the second music video of the album. According to the statistical results announced at the end of 2009, Hadise was the most popular celebrity of the year.

=== 2011–13: Aşk Kaç Beden Giyer? ===
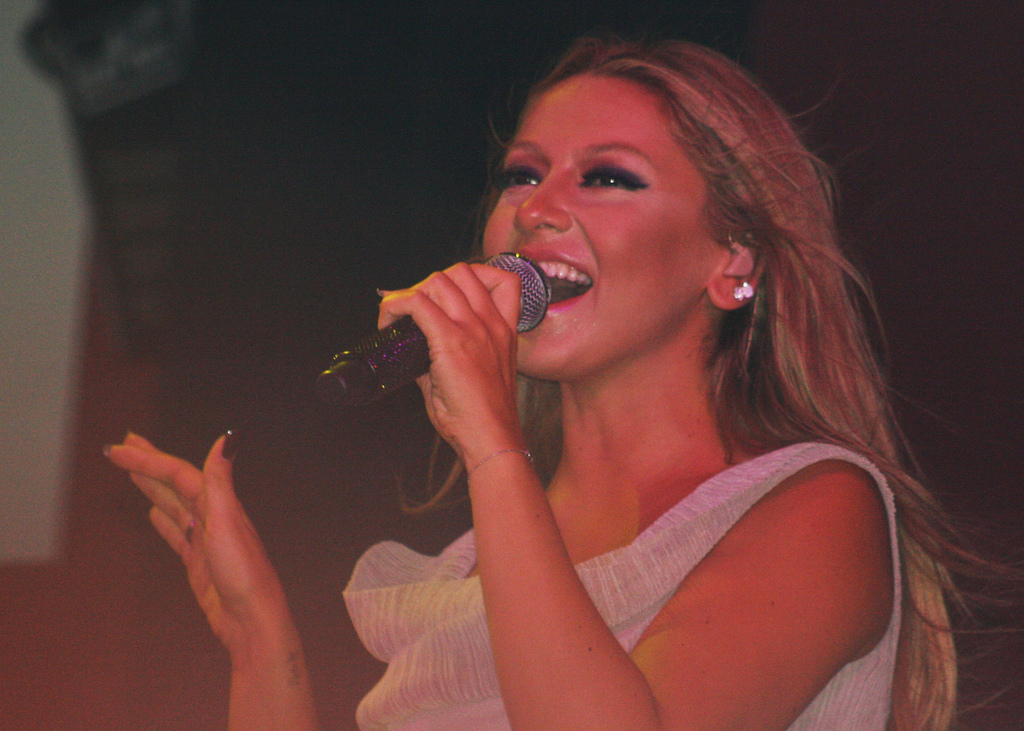
Hadise performing on stage in 2011

After her successful tour, Hadise began working on her second Turkish album, Aşk Kaç Beden Giyer?. The album was produced by Seyhan Müzik and released on 11 April 2011. It quickly became a huge success and sold more than 35,000 copies in Turkey. The preparation of the album took more time than expected due to Hadise's breakup with her producer and boyfriend Sinan Akçıl, who was supposed to be a songwriter for this album. As a dance-pop album, Aşk Kaç Beden Giyer? received mixed reviews from critics with some finding it too ordinary and the others praising it for its high standards in the Turkish pop music category. The lead single, "Superman", quickly began gaining airplay in Turkey and ranked number 5 on Türkçe Top 20 and eventually became the eighth most-downloaded song of the year. The two following songs, "Aşk Kaç Beden Giyer?" and "Mesajımı Almıştır O", were also released with separate music videos respectively. After the release of the album, Hadise was chosen as the main performer at the 38th Golden Butterfly Awards.

On 11 June 2012, Hadise released a single titled "Biz Burdayız". Besides the official version, a remix version of "Biz Burdayız" was also released, featuring English vocals by rapper Kaan. She subsequently released another single titled "Visal", which is in dubstep genre.

=== 2014–present: Tavsiye and Şampiyon ===
In January 2014, Hadise stated that her older sibling, Hülya Açıkgöz, would be directing her upcoming and subsequent music videos. Her sixth studio album, Tavsiye (English: Advice), was produced by Pasaj Müzik and released in August 2014. The album eventually sold 16,000 copies in Turkey. When questioned about the title of the album Hadise said that she had a song with the same title and she felt that the collection of songs on the album contained advice for women, hence she chose this title. The debut single from the album was confirmed to be "Nerdesin Aşkım". The music and lyrics were provided by Alper Narman and Onur Özdemir, the arrangement was done by İskender Paydaş, and Hülya Açıkgöz directed the music video. The second single from Tavsiye was "Prenses". This music video was also directed by Hülya Açıkgöz. Music videos for the songs "Yaz Günü" and "Bu Aralar" were released in 2015 and 2016 respectively. "Nerdesin Aşkım?" and "Bu Aralar" were the two songs from this album that became number-one hits in Turkey.

Hadise's seventh studio album, Şampiyon (English: Champion), was released in June 2017. A music video for the album's lead single, which shares the same name as the album itself, was released on the same day and the song itself ranked second on the MusicTopTR Fastest Rising Chart in Turkey. The song "Sıfır Tolerans" rose to the first position on the MusicTopTR Official Chart. Its music video was later described as erotic by the Radio and Television Supreme Council and, as a result, the channels that had broadcast it were fined. Hadise, who described this decision as an act of patriarchy and sexism, commented on the issue by saying: "Our male artists have had numerous scenes with actresses/models and they do not fall into the category of 'erotic' at all. As a woman, do I have to submit to this? No. 'He's a man so he does whatever he likes, she's a woman so she stays quiet' I will fight with this mindset until the end". Two more music videos from the album were released for the songs "Farkımız Var" and "Aşk Dediğin", the first of which ranked sixth on Turkey's official music chart.

Hadise, who became the face of Fanta's commercials in Turkey in 2019, released a single produced by the company in August 2019. The song, titled "Geliyorum Yanına", was written and composed by Gülşen. Its music video, which took 32 hours to shoot, was first shown to the public during Hadise's concert at the Cemil Topuzlu Open-Air Theatre on 10 August 2019.

In September 2020, her new single "Küçük Bir Yol" was released by Pasaj Müzik. In February 2021, she released her second EP, titled Aşka Kapandım. The EP's lead single, "Olsun", was written and composed by Yıldız Tilbe and Devrim Karaoğlu and its music video was directed by Şenol Korkmaz. In June 2021, Hadise released the single "Hay Hay", which was written and composed by Ersay Üner. The song's music video was inspired by the death of Evelyn McHale, who committed suicide by jumping from the 86th-floor observation deck of the Empire State Building.

== Television career ==
In 2006, Hadise presented Popstar Türkiye (Turkish version of Popstars). It was her first presenting role in Turkey. From 2008 to 2009, she got a job as a presenter for the first time in Belgium. She was the presenter of the second season of the Belgian X Factor on VTM. Although it was her first television job in Belgium, Hadise garnered much praise. She handled a critical moment when Maurice Engelen, one of the judges, left the contest during a live television cast. Hadise was also praised by the candidats of X Factor for guiding them. Since 2011, Hadise has been working as one of the judges on the singing competition show O Ses Türkiye (Turkish version of The Voice).

== Other ventures ==
=== Products and endorsements ===
In 2009, it was announced that Hadise signed a deal with Yedigün, a Turkish Soda company for a promotional deal, which includes her featuring in TV commercials, on Billboards and taking part in a summer tour.

In October 2021, Hadise launched her own clothing brand called Kert, the products of which were put on sale on GittiGidiyor.

=== Philanthropy ===
In September 2009, Hadise donated her time in support of the "Schools without Bullying" campaign in Belgium. During a press conference held by the organization, Hadise explained how as a child she "was bullied for her clothes" and even "because of her origin". She explained that she wanted to be part of the project because she loved children and had been a graduate herself, she understood how there was no place for bullying.

=== Acting ===
Hadise has rejected two offers to star in a film. One of the parts was the leading role in a Turkish movie. Not much is known about this film, apart from the fact that the film supposedly focused on two sisters, one of whom was to be played by Hadise. In July 2008, Hadise was again offered a role in a Turkish comedy film.

== Personal life ==
Hadise married businessman Mehmet Dinçerler on 30 April 2022 at Çırağan Palace. She filed for divorce on 15 September 2022, which was finalized on 30 September 2022.

More than 70 former Eurovision contestants, including Hadise, signed an open letter to the European Broadcasting Union (EBU) calling for Israel to be banned from the contest due to the Gaza war.

== Discography ==
- 2005: Sweat
- 2008: Hadise
- 2009: Fast Life
- 2009: Kahraman
- 2011: Aşk Kaç Beden Giyer?
- 2014: Tavsiye
- 2017: Şampiyon
- 2021: Aşka Kapandım
- 2026: H.

== Television ==
Television
Year	Title	Role	Notes
2003	Idool 2003	Herself	
2004	Idool 2004	Herself	
2006	Het swingpaleis	Herself	
2006	De show van het jaar 2006	Herself	
2006, 2008	Zo is er maar één	Herself	Two episodes
2006	Avrupa Yakası	Herself	
2009	Wij van België	Herself	
2009	Eurovision Song Contest 2009	Herself	
2010	Zonde van de zendtijd	Herself	
2011–2020	O Ses Türkiye	Herself	As coach
2014–2016	O Ses Çocuklar	Herself	As coach
2015	Survivor All Star	Herself	
2018	Survivor 2018	Herself	
2018	Jet Sosyete	Herself	Episode 20
2020	Survivor 2020	Herself	Episode 44 and 86
2021	O Ses Türkiye Rap	Herself	As coach
2024	Esas Oğlan	Ceren	

== Awards ==
Achievements
Preceded by Mor ve Ötesi with "Deli"	Turkey in the Eurovision Song Contest; 2009	Succeeded by maNga with "We Could Be the Same"
Preceded by First title	Best Female Performer in the Balkans; 2009	Succeeded by (Romania) Inna
