= Billboard Türkiye =

Turkish edition of Billboard magazine (2006–2010)

- Billboard Türkiye logo
- Editor: Meltem Fıratlı
- Categories: Music magazine
- Publisher: Erman Yerdelen, Aydın Demirer
- First issue: November 2006
- Final issue: 2010
- Company: Nielsen Music Control
- Country: Turkey
- Based in: Istanbul
- Language: Turkish

Billboard Türkiye was a Turkish language publication in agreement with the American Billboard. The magazine existed between 2006 and 2010.

== History and profile ==
Billboard Türkiye magazine was launched in November 2006. It included articles on new bands, CD releases, concerts, and artist profiles. It also published Türkiye Top 20, an official Turkish chart for non-Turkish foreign language songs. "Billboard Radio" broadcast the chart on 87.7 Rokket FM (Istanbul). Billboard Charts were accepted as Turkey's official charts for foreign language songs. The charts were updated every Monday at the website and in the magazine. Starting September 2009, the charts were compiled on a monthly basis.

The magazine ceased publication in 2010. Billboard has continued to publish Turkey Songs chart, which exclusively list trending Turkish-language songs weekly.
