= My Body (Hadise song) =

Single by Hadise

from the album Hadise
- Released: (Belgium) 18 February 2008 (Turkey) 16 June 2008
- Recorded: 2007
- Genre: Pop, R&B
- Length: 3:06 (Radio Edit); 5:04 (Lotion Remix)
- Label: EMI Belgium
- Songwriter(s): Hadise and Yves Jongen.
- Producer(s): Yves Jongen

Hadise singles chronology
"A Good Kiss" (2007)	"My Body" (2008)	"My Man and the Devil on His Shoulder" (2008)

My Body is an English R&B song by Belgian-Turkish singer Hadise, it was also co-written by Hadise and Yves Jongen. It is the seventh single from Hadise so far and is also the second single from her second studio album Hadise, released 6 June 2008.

The song has been added to Music On Demand by Virgin Media in the UK.

== Music video ==
Hadise shot the video and teamed up with director Şenol Korkmaz, who also shot the video for 'Milk Chocolate Girl'. Eddie Morales, a choreographer and professional dancer, who's worked with artists such as Justin Timberlake, Mariah Carey, Gwen Stefani and Missy Elliott, features in the music video alongside Hadise. Hadise can be seen holding a little crocodile in the video.

== Chart performance ==
"My Body" debuted on the Belgium Ultratop 50 chart on 23 February at No. 8, the highest debut that week, debuting higher than Kylie Minogue's song In My Arms which debuted at #33. Also Hadise was the Top Belgium artist on the chart that week. "My Body" became Hadise's best single by chart position and was her first top 10 single. The song became popular in the Balkan countries and started airing on the Bulgarian Balkanika TV's playlist.

== Track listing ==
Belgium CD single & iTunes download (Europe)

1. "My Body (Radio Edit)" – 3:06
2. "My Body (Lotion Remix)" – 5:04

== Charts ==
Chart (2008)	Peak position
Belgium Singles Top 50	8
Turkish Singles Chart	1
