= A Good Kiss =

Single by Hadise

from the album Hadise
- Released: 3 September 2007
- Recorded: 2007
- Genre: Pop
- Label: EMI Belgium
- Songwriter(s): Hadise Açikgöz, Yves Jongen

Hadise singles chronology
| "Bad Boy" (2006) | "A Good Kiss" (2007) | "My Body" (2008) |

"A Good Kiss" is the sixth single by Belgian-Turkish singer Hadise. It is also the first single from her expected second album Hadise. The song also featured in the drama movie "Vermist". The song has become her most successful song yet, as it is, currently, the only song to chart in both Belgium and Turkey.

The song was re-written into Turkish, by Turkish Pop legend Sezen Aksu, the Turkish version is entitled "Deli Oğlan", which also features on her second studio album as a bonus track. A music video was shot for "Deli Oğlan" and released on June 6, 2008.

== Release history ==
| Region | Date |
|---|---|
| Belgium | 3 September 2007 |
| Turkey | 26 December 2007 |

== Chart performance ==
The song entered the chart at 49. It then fell off the chart for a week then re-entered and rose to peak at 28. Charting for 8 weeks in total.

In Turkey "A Good Kiss" charted on the official billboard chart peaking at 6 on the 'Turkey Top 20' chart.

== Charts ==
| Chart (2007) | Peak position |
|---|---|
| Turkey Top 20 Chart | 1 |
| Belgium Singles Top 50 | 28 |

== Track listing ==
Belgium CD & iTunes download (Europe)

1. "A Good Kiss (Radio Edit)"
2. "A Good Kiss (Club Mix)"
3. "A Good Kiss (Original Version)"
