= Fast Life (Hadise album) =

Studio album by Hadise
- Released: May 15, 2009
- Recorded: 2008–2009
- Genre: R&B, Electropop, Pop
- Length: 39:19
- Label: EMI
- Producer: Sinan Akçıl, Yves Gaillard, Erdem Kınay, Volga Tamöz, Yannic Fonderie

Hadise chronology
Hadise (2008)	Fast Life (2009)	Kahraman (2009)

Singles from Hadise
- 1. "Düm Tek Tek" Released: April 13, 2009; 2. "Fast Life" Released: June 15, 2009

Fast Life is the third studio album by Turkish-Belgian singer Hadise. It was released on May 15, 2009 and features the 2009 Eurovision song for Turkey, "Düm Tek Tek".

== Singles ==
- "Düm Tek Tek" ("Boom Bang Bang") was the lead single from Hadise's third album "Fast Life". It was released to Turkey on April 3, 2009, as an EP. The single was the Turkish entry for the Eurovision Song Contest 2009, and came fourth in the contest.
- "Fast Life" is the official second single. It was released on 15 June 2009.

== Track listing ==
CD
No.	Title	Music	Length
1.	"Düm Tek Tek"	Hadise Açıkgöz, Sinan Akçıl, Stefan Fernande	3:02
2.	"Fast Life"	Hadise Açıkgöz, Yves Gaillard	3:01
3.	"Supernatural Love"	Hadise Açıkgöz, Stefaan Fernande, Erdem Kınay	3:41
4.	"Long Distance Relationships"	Hadise Açıkgöz, Yves Gaillard	3:12
5.	"Hero"	Hadise Açıkgöz, Sinan Akçıl, Stefaan Fernande	3:35
6.	"Married Men"	Hadise Açıkgöz, Yves Gaillard	3:04
7.	"On Top"	Hadise Açıkgöz, Sinan Akçıl, Stefaan Fernande	3:39
8.	"Obsession"	Hadise Açıkgöz, Stefaan Fernande, Erdem Kınay	4:04
9.	"Double Life"	Hadise Açıkgöz, Yves Jongen, Volga Tamöz	3:21
10.	"First Steps"	Hadise Açıkgöz, Yves Gaillard	2:55
11.	"I'll Try Not To Cry"	Bruce Smith, Robert D.Fisher, Yannic Fonderie	3:02
12.	"Düm Tek Tek (Club Mix)"	Hadise Açıkgöz, Sinan Akçıl, Stefan Fernande	4:03

=== Japanese Edition ===
The album was re-released under the name of her self named second studio album "Hadise".

CD
No.	Title	Music	Length
1.	"Düm Tek Tek"	Hadise Açıkgöz, Sinan Akçıl, Stefan Fernande	3:02
2.	"Fast Life"	Hadise Açıkgöz, Yves Gaillard	3:01
3.	"My Body"	Hadise Açıkgöz, L. T. Hutton	3:01
4.	"A Good Kiss"	Hadise Açıkgöz, Yves Jongen	3:29
5.	"Supernatural Love"	Hadise Açıkgöz, Stefaan Fernande, Erdem Kınay	3:41
6.	"Long Distance Relationships"	Hadise Açıkgöz, Yves Gaillard	3:12
7.	"Hero"	Hadise Açıkgöz, Sinan Akçıl, Stefaan Fernande	3:35
8.	"Married Men"	Hadise Açıkgöz, Yves Gaillard	3:04
9.	"On Top"	Hadise Açıkgöz, Sinan Akçıl, Stefaan Fernande	3:39
10.	"Obsession"	Hadise Açıkgöz, Stefaan Fernande, Erdem Kınay	4:04
11.	"Double Life"	Hadise Açıkgöz, Yves Jongen, Volga Tamöz	3:21
12.	"First Steps"	Hadise Açıkgöz, Yves Gaillard	2:55
13.	"I'll Try Not To Cry"	Bruce Smith, Robert D.Fisher, Yannic Fonderie	3:02
14.	"Düm Tek Tek (Club Mix)"		4:02
15.	"Fast Life (Cutee B Remix)"	Hadise Açıkgöz, Sinan Akçıl, Stefan Fernande	3:09
16.	"A Good Kiss (Club Mix)"	Hadise Açıkgöz, Sinan Akçıl, Stefan Fernande	3:19

== Charts ==
Chart (2009)	Peak position
Belgian Albums Chart (Flanders)	16
Japan Top Albums	66
