= Gripin (album) =

Studio album by Gripin
- Released: 26 February 2007
- Recorded: GRGDN
- Genre: Alternative rock
- Label: Sony Music/GRGDN
- Producer: Haluk Kurosman

Gripin chronology
| Hikayeler Anlatıldı 2 (2005) | Gripin (2007) |

Gripin is the self-titled second studio album of Turkish rock band Gripin, released on 26 February 2007 by Sony Music/GRGDN.

== Track listing ==
1. Böyle Kahpedir Dünya
2. Sana Ne Bundan
3. Sensiz İstanbul'a Düşmanım (guest vocal: Emre Aydın)
4. Olduğu Kadar
5. Sustukların Büyür İçinde
6. Zor Geliyor (guest vocal: Pamela Spence)
7. Hiç Gelme Gideceksen
8. Baba Mesleği (guest vocal: Ferman Akgül)
9. Zamana Bırakma Bizi
10. Dört

== Album credits ==
- Producer: Haluk Kurosman
- Supervising producers: Hadi Elazzi, Selim Serezli
- Edit: Haluk Kurosman, Arda İnceoğlu
- Mixing assistant: Arda İnceoğlu
- Mastering: Çağlar Türkmen
- Photo: Fatih Uysal
- Design: Volkan Lale

=== Musicians ===
- Kempa yaylı grubu (Böyle Kahpedir Dünya, Olduğu Kadar, Sensiz İstanbul'a Düşmanım)

== Writing credits ==
- Böyle Kahpedir Dünya
  - Lyrics: S. Birol Namoğlu, Haluk Kurosman
  - Music: S. Birol Namoğlu, Murat Başdoğan
- Sana Ne Bundan
  - Lyrics: S. Birol Namoğlu, Haluk Kurosman
  - Music: S. Birol Namoğlu, Murat Başdoğan, Haluk Kurosman
- Sensiz İstanbul'a Düşmanım (guest vocal: Emre Aydın)
  - Lyrics: S. Birol Namoğlu, Emre Aydın, Haluk Kurosman
  - Music: S. Birol Namoğlu, Emre Aydın, Murat Başdoğan
- Olduğu Kadar
  - Lyrics: S. Birol Namoğlu, Haluk Kurosman
  - Music: S. Birol Namoğlu, Murat Başdoğan
- Sustukların Büyür İçinde
  - Lyrics: Evren Gülçığ, S. Birol Namoğlu, Haluk Kurosman
  - Music: Arda İnceoğlu, Evren Gülçığ, S. Birol Namoğlu, Haluk Kurosman
- Zor Geliyor (guest vocal: Pamela Spence)
  - Music & Lyrics: Evren Gülçığ, S. Birol Namoğlu
- Hiç Gelme Gideceksen
  - Lyrics: S. Birol Namoğlu, Haluk Kurosman, Murat Başdoğan
  - Music: S. Birol Namoğlu, Murat Başdoğan
- Baba Mesleği (guest vocal: Ferman Akgül)
  - Music & Lyrics: S. Birol Namoğlu, Murat Başdoğan, Haluk Kurosman
- Zamana Bırakma Bizi
  - Lyrics: S. Birol Namoğlu, Evren Gülçığ
  - Music: S. Birol Namoğlu, Arda İnceoğlu
- Dört
  - Music & Lyrics: Evren Gülçığ, S. Birol Namoğlu, Haluk Kurosman

== Music videos ==
- Böyle Kahpedir Dünya
  - directed by Gürcan Keltek; the video describes how the kahpe dünya (whore world) works in the nightlife of Istanbul
- Sensiz İstanbul'a Düşmanım
  - Duet with Emre Aydın
- Dalgalandım da Duruldum
  - The song is not featured in the album; cover song
