= Koray =

- Gender: Male

Origin
- Language: Turkish
- Meaning: Ember Moon

Other names
- Related names: Corey

Koray is a Turkish given name and a surname. It is composed of "Kor" and "Ay". In Turkish "Kor" means "Ember" and "Ay" means "Moon". Thus, "Koray" means "a moon in the colour of ember".

== People ==
=== Given name ===
- Koray Aldemir, German poker player
- Koray Ariş, Turkish sculptor
- Koray Arslan, Turkish footballer
- Koray Avcı (footballer), Turkish footballer
- Koray Avcı (musician), Turkish musician
- Koray Aydın, Turkish politician
- Koray Candemir, Turkish musician
- Koray Günter, German-Turkish footballer
- Koray Şanlı, Turkish footballer
- KYROXH (Koray Akin Cansiz), Turkish-American rapper

=== Surname ===
- Erkin Koray, Turkish rock musician
- Kenan Hulusi Koray, Turkish writer
