= GRGDN =

Turkish record label

GRGDN Müzik Prodüksiyon Organizasyon ve Menajerlik San. Tic. Ltd. Şti
- Company type: Private
- Industry: Music & Entertainment
- Founded: 2003
- Headquarters: Istanbul, Turkey
- Key people: Haluk Kurosman; Hadi Elazzi Founders
- Products: Music & Entertainment
- Website: www.grgdn.com
- Footnotes / references GRGDN functions as an independent record label but they also work in cooperation with Sony Music Turkey

GRGDN is a Turkish music production and artist management company and record label based in Istanbul. The name of the company originates from the Turkish word gergedan which means rhinoceros.

It was founded in 2003 by OIART-graduated producer Haluk Kurosman and Hadi Elazzi, who had formerly worked for such companies like Sire Records (Warner Music) or Sony Music Turkey. The company has its own recording studio in Ulus, Istanbul and does the management of several renowned Turkish artists.

In 2011 Haluk Kurosman parted ways with GRGDN to become a freelance producer.

== Record label ==
GRGDN released the first album of Turkish rock band Gripin as an independent record label. Together with Sony BMG they released several other albums. The studio recordings usually take place at the company's own studio, supervised by Haluk Kurosman. The full list of albums published or co-published by GRGDN is as follows:

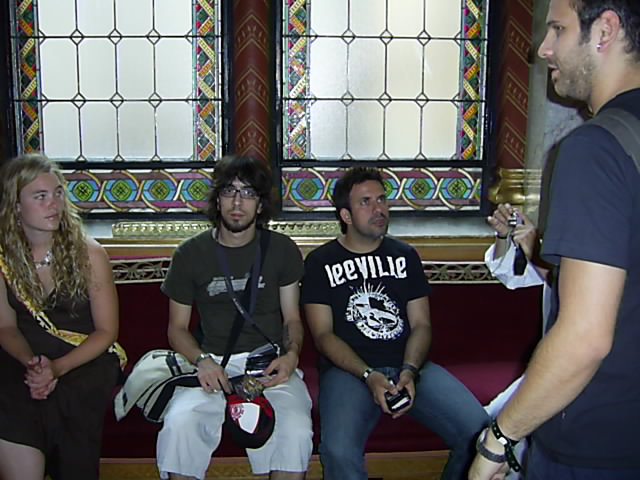
Yağmur Sarıgül guitarist and Hadi Elazzi (sitting in the middle from left to right) and Cem Bahtiyar bass player (standing on the right) in the Parliament of Hungary, August 2006.

Date	Artist/Title	Note
2004 April	Gripin / Hikayeler Anlatıldı	Published independently
2004 December	maNga / maNga	Published in cooperation with Sony BMG
2005 May	Gripin / Hikayeler Anlatıldı 2	Published in cooperation with Sony BMG
2005 December	Vega / Hafif Müzik	Published in cooperation with Sony BMG
2006 July	maNga/ maNga+	Published in cooperation with Sony BMG
2006 October	Emre Aydın/ Afili Yalnızlık	Published in cooperation with Sony BMG
2007 March	Gripin / Gripin	Published in cooperation with Sony BMG
2009 April	maNga / Şehr-i Hüzün	Published in cooperation with Sony BMG
2019 April	The Young Shaven / Hidden Hips	Published independently
2020 May	Koray Candemir / İhtimaller	Published in cooperation with The state51 Conspiracy

== Artist management ==
The company undertook the management of several successful artists. Among others, they manage maNga, who have received gold status for their album sales in Turkey and Emre Aydın, who has won several prestigious awards this year as "Best Newcomer".

The full list of GRGDN-managed artists is as follows:

- maNga
- Vega
- Gripin (until 2009)
- Göksel (until 2009)
- emreaydın (until 2010)
- Badem
- Cartel
