= Gripin =

Turkish pop rock band

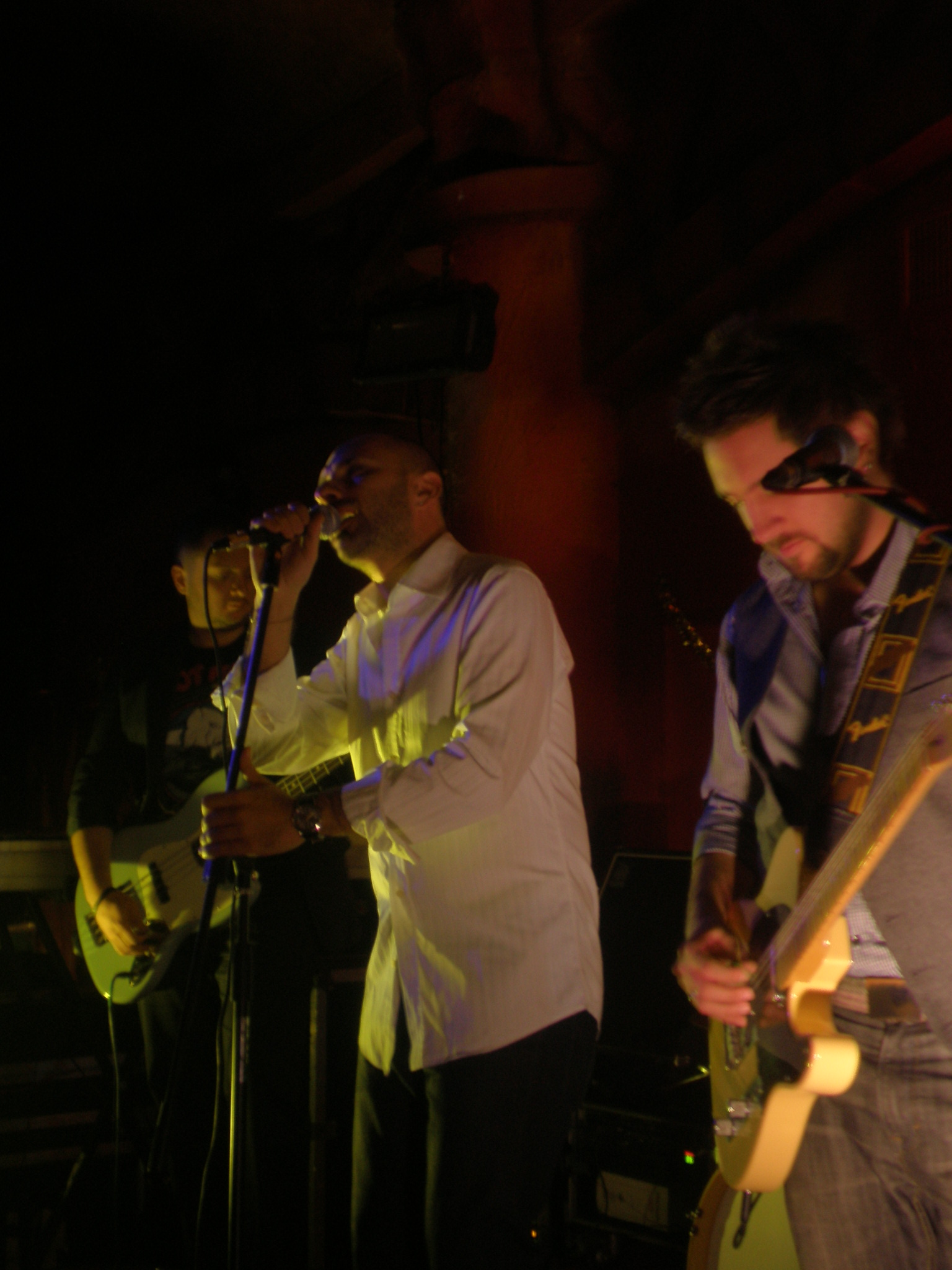
- Gripin on stage in Antalya

Background information
- Origin: Istanbul, Turkey
- Genres: Alternative rock
- Years active: 1999–present
- Labels: Avrupa Muzik
- Members: S. Birol Namoğlu (vocals); Murat Başdoğan (guitar); Tunç Arda İnceoğlu (Bass guitar); İlker Baliç (drums).

Gripin is a Turkish rock band based in Istanbul. The members are Birol Namoğlu (vocals), Murat Başdoğan (guitar), Arda İnceoğlu (bass guitar), and İlker Baliç (drums). The band's name is derived from a flu medicine brand in Turkey.

== The beginning ==
They started as a cover band, playing in bars like Bronx in mid-'90s, and earned a cult following. Their wide repertoire not only included Britpop, but also featured examples of American alternative rock and in some cases, Turkish rock. The band started off together in 1999 playing mostly cover tracks in Turkish bars and clubs. Soon, they managed to establish themselves as a name behind the music they covered.

== Hikayeler Anlatıldı ==
In the early 2000s, they started recording their own songs and released the album Hikayeler Anlatıldı (Stories were Told) in 2004, which was later released as a double album containing acoustic versions of the album's songs. Some of the singles featured in this album include "Karışmasın Kimseler" (Don't Let Anyone Stand Between Us) and "Elalem" (Everybody).

== Second album ==
The following album was self-titled and was released on February 26, 2007. The new album features duets with popular Turkish artists like Ferman Akgül from maNga, Pamela Spence, and Emre Aydın. The producer of the album is Haluk Kurosman, the successful producer of many young Turkish talents (like maNga, Emre Aydın, Vega, and Göksel). The band is managed by Hadi Elazzi of GRGDN, the company Elazzi owns together with Kurosman.

Gripin's new single, entitled "Böyle Kahpedir Dünya" (This World is a Harlot) has become a huge hit with television and radio stations, having led the Top 10 chart of MTV Türkiye. The following single, "Sensiz Istanbul'a Düşmanım" (I Hate Istanbul Without You) – a duet with Emre Aydın – saw an equal amount of success in terms of its popularity in Turkey.

The band has recently won the prestigious Hürriyet Altın Kelebek Awards as Best Newcoming Band (see the Awards section). To this day, the band continues to perform in clubs, concerts, and festivals.

== Members ==
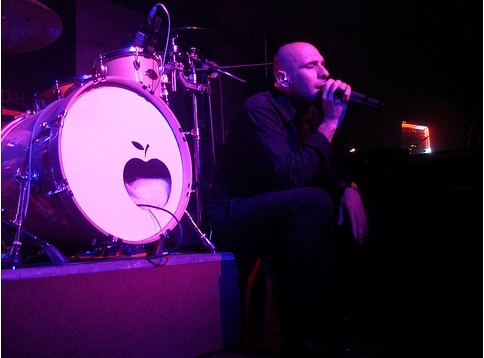
Birol Namoğlu on stage

- Birol Namoğlu was born on November 9, 1978, and studied metallurgical engineering. He is the vocalist of the band.
- İlker Baliç is the drummer of Gripin, born on May 22, 1980. He studies (in English) at the School of Economics at Istanbul University.
- Murat Başdoğan, born on December 26, 1981, is the guitarist of the band. He studies architecture at Mimar Sinan University.
- Evren Gülçığ is the bass guitarist, born on September 6, 1977. He studied civil engineering and graduated from Istanbul University with a degree in finance. He used to be the creative director of his own company dealing with web design. Now he works for an advertising company as multimedia director.
- Arda İnceoğlu was born on February 21, 1982. He plays the keyboard in Gripin and at the same time studies chemistry at Kocaeli University.

== Discography ==
| Year | Album |
|---|---|
| 2004 | Hikayeler Anlatıldı (The Stories Are Told) |
| 2005 | Hikayeler Anlatıldı 2 |
| 2007 | Gripin |
| 2010 | MS. 05.03.2010 |
| 2012 | Yalnızlığın Çaresini Bulmuşlar |

=== Singles ===
| Year | Title | Album | Turkish Nielsen Airplay Chart |
|---|---|---|---|
| 2007 | "Böyle Kahpedir Dünya" (This World is a Harlot) | Gripin | 1 |

== Awards ==
- 34. Hürriyet Altın Kelebek Ödülleri (Golden Butterfly Awards)
  - "Best Newcoming Band"
- 11. Istanbul FM Gold Awards 2007
  - Best rock band
  - Best song with best lyrics & music (together with Emre Aydın for the song Sensiz İstanbul'a Düşmanım)
- Dream Magazine 2007 Awards
  - Yılın Yerli Müzik Olayı (Domestic Music Event of the Year): Gripin–Emre Aydın: Sensiz İstanbul'a Düşmanım feat
- Dream TV 2007 Top 50 Songs
  - 3rd place: Gripin–Emre Aydın: Sensiz İstanbul'a Düşmanım (first among Turkish songs)
  - 15th place: Böyle Kahpedir Dünya

== Theme songs ==
- Komşu Kızı for the TV series Geniş Aile on Kanal D (2009)
