= 6. Cadde =

Turkish alternative rock band

- Origin: İzmir, Turkey
- Genre: Alternative rock
- Years active: 1999–2003, 2019–
- Label: Universal Music
- Members: Emre Aydın; Ahmet Kalabay
- Past members: Onur Ela

6. Cadde (literally meaning "Sixth Street") is a Turkish alternative rock group formed by MTV EMA winner Emre Aydın and Onur Ela in 2002 in İzmir. They were signed by Universal Music Turkey. The band started afresh in 2019 with Ahmet Kalabay replacing Onur Ela.

== Career ==
They published demo recordings for two songs, Rüyamdaki aptal kadin (Foolish Woman in my Dream) and Tesadüfen (By Chance) on the internet. The group went through major transformation during the years, with changing band members, the final set-up with Onur Ela applied for the musical competition Sing Your Song, which they won. This made them possible to record their first professional album, produced by Haluk Kurosman and published by Universal Music Turkey in 2003. The recording was done in Istanbul in a month's time, while all-round production of the album took 2,5 months. The first single from the album was Sabuha, previously sung by such arabesk performers like Ibrahim Tatlises. Sabuha came to life by one of the tasks the jury of Sing Your Song assigned to the participants, namely that each band had to cover a song outside of their own musical genre. The song was refurbished by 6. Cadde from a different musical approach, changing its style and arrangements, in less than 15 minutes, as they had forgotten about the task and hurriedly recorded Sabuha for next day's competition shooting. Later the song was re-recorded for the album. In an interview Kurosman gave away that the 6. Cadde album was the rough mix of studio recordings, previously prepared for radio promotion, because his computer's hard disk became damaged, all the records vanished, and they did not have time to record them all over again.

Soon after the debut single, Sabuha came out, Onur Ela decided to finish his professional musical career. Emre Aydın went solo, recording Afili Yalnızlık with GRGDN, which became a hit, winning Aydın several music awards.

In 2019 6. Cadde released a new album called Uyut Beni.

== Discography ==
6. Cadde (2003)

1. Sabuha
2. Yine de sen
3. Git
4. Çığlık Çığlığa
5. Koyver Gitsin
6. Dönersen
7. Kör Talih
8. Rüyamdaki Aptal Kadın
9. Geçen Cuma
10. Çalma açmam kapıyı
11. Sen ve ben
12. Sabuha 2
13. Dönersen (Akustik)

Uyut Beni (2019)

1. Yalan
2. Uyut Beni
3. Güllerim Soldu
4. Sen Ve Ben
5. Sen De Beni Hatırla
6. Dönersen (feat. Onur Ela)
7. Rüyamdaki Aptal Kadın
8. Şehir
9. Beni Bırakma (feat. Kaan Beyru)
