= Afili Yalnızlık =

Studio album by Emre Aydın
- Released: 10 October 2006
- Recorded: GRGDN
- Genre: Pop rock, alternative rock
- Length: 47:40
- Label: Sony Music/GRGDN
- Producer: Haluk Kurosman

Emre Aydın chronology
| 6. Cadde; (2003) | Afili Yalnızlık (2006) | Kağıt Evler (2010) |

Afili Yalnızlık (Ostentatious Loneliness) is the first solo album of Turkish alternative rock musician Emre Aydın, released by Sony Music/GRGDN. The album has received wide attention and several awards in Turkey. The entire album is built around the concept of loneliness, concerning both the lyrics and the melancholic music. The first video, having the same title as the album, was shot by renowned director Yon Thomas.

== Track listing ==
Dayan Yalnızlığım
The song gives a clear picture about the melancholic style of the album and the concept of loneliness it is built upon

1. Afili Yalnızlık (Ostentatious Loneliness)
2. Git (Leave)
3. Hareket Vakti (Time to move)
4. Ve Gülümse Şimdi (Bebeğim) (And smile now (My baby))
5. Bu Kez Anladım (This time I understood)
6. Kim Dokunduysa Sana (Whoever touched you)
7. Belki Bir Gün Özlersin (Maybe one day you'll miss me)
8. Kalan Sağlar Senin Olsun (The Living Be Yours)
9. Unut Gittiğin Bir Yerde (Forget, wherever you are)
10. Dayan Yalnızlığım (Endure, my loneliness)
- Hidden track: Tesadüfen (By Chance)

== Album information ==
=== Personnel ===
- Management: Hadi Elazzi, Selim Serezli
- Producer: Haluk Kurosman
- Arrangement:
  - Haluk Kurosman (1, 2, 3, 4, 6, 7, 8, 10),
  - Tuğrul Akyüz, Haluk Kurosman (5, 9)
- Studio: GRGDN
- Recording, Editing, Mixing: Haluk Kurosman
- Mastering: Çağlar Türkmen
- Design: Homework, Serdar Beyaz
- Photography: Cemil Ağacıkoğlu

=== Musicians ===
- Emre Aydın:
  - Vocal, backing vocal
  - acoustic guitar (7, 8, 10)
  - electric guitar (3, 7, 9, 10)
  - classical guitar (4)
- Haluk Kurosman:
  - Electronic underworks, keyboards
  - acoustic guitar (7, 8, 10)
  - electric guitar (1, 7, 9, 10)
  - bass guitar (2, 3, 4, 5, 6, 7, 8)
  - percussion (1, 3, 9, 10)
  - backing vocals (8, 9)
- Tuğrul Akyüz (Vega):
  - acoustic guitar (7, 8)
  - electric guitar (3, 5, 8, 10)
  - Electric underworks (3, 5, 6, 7, 8, 9)
- Yusuf Torun:
  - acoustic guitar (1, 3, 9)
  - electric guitar (3, 4, 6, 7, 8, 9)
- İlker Baliç (Gripin): drums
- Cem Bahtiyar (maNga): bass guitar (1, 9, 10)
- Onur Ela: acoustic and electric guitar (2, 5)
- Özgür Salı: keyboards and piano (4, 10)
- Neslihan Engin: keyboards (8)
- Kempa Yaylı Grubu: stringed instruments (1, 3, 4, 8)

=== Videos ===
1. Afili Yalnızlık (Ostentatious Loneliness) (directed by Yon Thomas)
2. Kim Dokunduysa Sana Ona Git (Whoever Touched You) (Emre Can)
3. Sensiz İstanbul'a Düşmanım (I Loathe Istanbul Without You) – duet with Gripin (directed by Gürcan Keltek)
4. Git (Go) (Yon Thomas, Mike Norman)
5. Belki Bir Gün Özlersin (Maybe One Day You'll Miss) (directed by Gürcan Keltek)
6. Bu Kez Anladım (This Time I Understood)
7. Dayan Yalnızlığım (Hold On My Loneliness) (directed by Fadıl Dinçer)
