= Haluk Kurosman =

Turkish musician

Haluk Kurosman (born 1 March 1975, Istanbul) is a Turkish music producer and co-founder (together with Hadi Elazzi) of GRGDN, a music production – management company and record label; producing, mixing and mastering the albums of successful young Turkish artists.

== Life and career ==
Kurosman started to play the guitar at the age of 15 and had his own band, where he was also the frontman. By the age of 23 he decided to move "backstage" and work as a producer. He is a graduate of Deutsche Schule Istanbul and Marmara University in business administration. Later he went to Canada, where he attended Ontario Institute of Audio Recording Technology (OIART) and graduated in 1999 as "perhaps the most brilliant student to attend OIART since its inception". Thus the institute has founded the Kurosman Award to be given to the most talented students.

Besides being a producer, Haluk Kurosman also contributed to some of the albums as a musician (guitars, keyboards) and as a co-songwriter-lyricist.

In 2011 he parted ways with GRGDN to work as a freelance producer.

== Discography ==
Haluk Kurosman's works include the album maNga, that reached gold status in Turkey as well as Emre Aydın's Afili Yalnızlık album that was a smash hit in Turkey. The full list of Kurosman's works is as follows:

- 2003, 6. Cadde, 6. Cadde
- 2004, gripin, Hikayeler Anlatıldı
- 2004, maNga, maNga
- 2005, gripin, Hikayeler Anlatıldı 2
- 2005, Vega, Hafif Müzik
- 2006, maNga, maNga+
- 2006, emreaydın, Afili Yalnızlık
- 2007, gripin, gripin
- 2009, maNga, Şehr-i Hüzün
- 2010, maNga, We Could Be The Same
- 2010, gripin, MS 05 03 2010
- 2010, Aslı Gökyokuş, Büyüdük
- 2011, Efsun, Sessiz Olmalıyım
- 2011, Kolpa, Son Nefesim
- 2011, Cartel, Bugünkü Neşen Cartel'den
- 2011, Seksendört, Akıyor Zaman
- 2011, gripin, Sensiz Olmaz Galatasaray
- 2012, Kolpa, Yatağın Soğuk Tarafı
