= Emre Aydın =

Turkish rock singer-songwriter

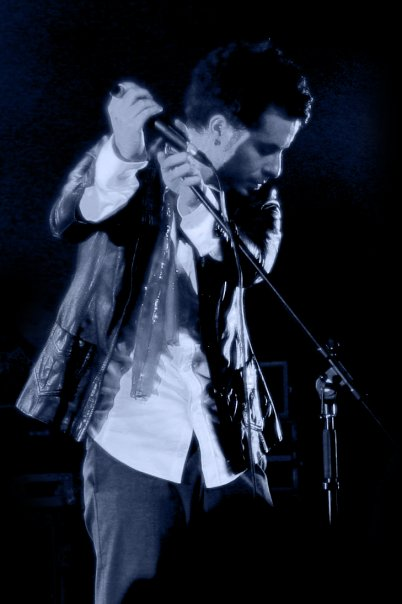

Background information
- Born: 2 February 1981 (age 45)
- Origin: Isparta, Turkey
- Genres: Pop rock, alternative rock
- Occupations: Singer, song-writer, composer, director
- Years active: 2002–present
- Labels: Sony Music (2006–2012); 565 (2012–2015); DMC (2015–2018); Hangar (2018–)
- Member of: 6. Cadde

Emre Aydın (born 2 February 1981) is a Turkish rock singer-songwriter. The singer won the MTV Europe Music Awards 2008 in the "Europe's Favourite Act" category. He is also the former lead singer for the Turkish rock band 6. Cadde.

== Biography ==
Emre Aydın was born in Isparta on 2 February 1981 as the first child of Şaban and Nermin Aydın, who are both pharmacists. He has a younger brother named Yiğit. In his early years, the family moved to Antalya. Emre began playing saz at an early age and later opted for guitar. He graduated from Antalya Anadolu Lisesi (high school) and then studied economics at Dokuz Eylül University in İzmir, upon his parents' wish. In a 2009 interview, Emre admitted that he never attended a musical conservatory, because he did not want to have his musical experience transformed into school lessons and exam sessions, which he thought would make him lose interest in music.

In 2016, the singer married his long time girlfriend, Eda Köksal, who is an interior architect.

== Career ==
=== Sing Your Song competition ===
In 2002, while at Dokuz Eylül University, Emre saw the advertisement of a musical competition, Sing Your Song, aired by a domestic television channel, Show TV. The jury included well-known Turkish rock singer Koray Candemir. With a friend, Onur Ela, they decided to apply with Emre's own song, Dönersen (If you come back), and out of 1500 applicants, they won the competition. The song was selected by Universal Music into a selection album and their band, named 6. Cadde was offered a contract with Universal Music Turkey.

=== 6. Cadde ===
6. Cadde (previously named EQ) was established in İzmir in 1999, by Emre Aydin and fellow students from the same university and published demo recordings for two songs, Rüyamdaki Aptal Kadın (Foolish Woman in my Dream) and Tesadüfen (By Chance) on the internet. The group went through major transforming during the years, with changing band members, the final set-up with Onur Ela applied for the musical competition Sing Your Song, which they won. This made them possible to record their first professional album, produced by Haluk Kurosman and published by Universal Music Turkey in 2003. The recording was done in Istanbul in a month's time, while all-round production of the album took 2 1/2 months. The first single from the album was Sabuha, previously sung by such arabesk performers as Ibrahim Tatlises. Sabuha came to life by one of the tasks the jury of Sing Your Song assigned to the participants, namely that each band had to cover a song outside of their own musical genre. The song was refurbished by 6. Cadde from a different musical approach, changing its style and arrangements, in less than 15 minutes, as they had forgotten about the task and hurriedly recorded Sabuha for next day's competition shooting. Later the song was re-recorded for the album. In an interview Kurosman gave away that the 6. Cadde album was the rough mix of studio recordings, previously prepared for radio promotion, because his computer's hard disk became damaged, all the records vanished, and they did not have time to record them all over again. Soon after the first stocks arrived to the shops, Universal Music Turkey closed down, Onur Ela decided to leave the band, and Emre opted for a solo career.

=== Solo career ===
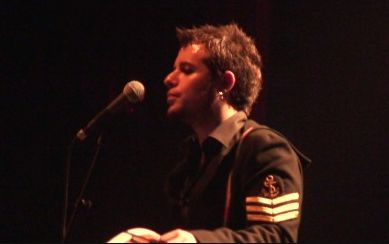
Emre Aydın in Cologne, Germany, February 2008.

After 6. Cadde broke up, Emre returned to Izmir, where he went through a difficult phase of his life. He had difficulties at the university, in finding a new rent, and other personal problems that made him write most of the songs of his first solo album, "Afili Yalnızlık" (Ostentatious Loneliness), released by Sony BMG in 2006, after he was signed by former 6. Cadde producer Haluk Kurosman and talent manager Hadi Elazzi's own company, GRGDN. The album was recorded in the GRGDN studio in the Ulus district of Istanbul. Emre was assisted by renowned Turkish musicians, bass guitar was played by Cem Bahtiyar of maNga, drums by İllker Baliç of Gripin, electric guitar by Tuğrul Akyüz of Vega and Kurosman himself also contributed as a musician. His first videoclip was shot for the title song, "Afili Yalnızlık", directed by cinematographer Yon Thomas, who has previously worked with, among others, Norah Jones and Slipknot. The storyline was also written by Thomas, who excluded the singer from the scenario of a narcissistic woman, played by Turkish actress Şebnem Dönmez. The story of the first video was extended to the following two videos, shot for "Kim Dokunduysa Sana" (Whoever Touched You) and "Git" (Go), the latter was also directed by Yon Thomas. Three more videos were shot, for "Belki Bir Gün Özlersin" (Maybe One Day You'll Miss), "Bu Kez Anladım" (I Understood It This Time) and "Dayan Yalnızlığım" (Endure, My Loneliness).

Emre's album quickly became a smash hit in Turkey, having won several awards, including Blue Jean Magazine's awards for Best Song, Best Newcomer, Best Music Video and his producer, Haluk Kurosman was named Best Producer. Emre also won the prestigious Powertürk Music Award as Best Newcomer in 2007 and a year later was awarded for the Best song and Best duet at the same gala (see Awards section for a full list of awards). The album received mostly positive criticism, according to Burhan Ayeri columnist, "Emre Aydın's performance at 2 Renk [a television programme] was extraordinary. With a good manager, he will sweep away Tarkan. As Özcan Deniz said, 'this is the first time we see all songs of an album being top hits'."

The singer is among the most frequently touring Turkish singers, in 2007 he gave 130 live concerts until August. Emre also completed his first European tour in 2008, composed of concerts in Bochum, Cologne and Rotterdam and performed in the Carling Academy, London on 11 May 2008.

On 6 November 2008, he won the MTV Europe Music Awards 2008 as Europe's Favourite Act. Upon this success, the singer decided to release an English single, planned for March 2009, which will be followed by his second Turkish album, ought to be released in May 2009.

The singer's popularity is effectively shown at his official forum, which had 79,000 registered members as of October 2007 and more than 150,000 as of October 2009.

== Discography ==
"Dayan Yalnızlığım" (2006)
The song gives a clear picture about the melancholic style of the Afili Yalnızlık album and the concept of loneliness it is built upon.

=== Albums ===
==== With 6. Cadde ====
Year	Band/Title
2003	6. Cadde; (Sixth Avenue)
2019	Uyut Beni (Make Me Sleep)

==== Solo albums ====
Year	Title	Sales
2006	Afili Yalnızlık (Ostentatious Loneliness)	120,000
2010	Kağıt Evler (Paper Houses)	117,000
2013	Eylül Geldi Sonra (September Arrived Afterwards)

==== Guest appearances ====
Year	Title/Artist
2008	Söz Müzik Teoman/Teoman; Sürpriz
2012	Orhan Gencebay İle Bir Ömür; Bir Teselli Ver
2013	Nilüfer:13 Düet; Son Perde
2025	Sana Değmez; Feridun Hürel Albüm

=== Singles ===
Year	Title
2010	Falling Down; Sony Music; Producer: Mats Valentin
2012	Beni Biraz Böyle Hatırla; DMC / 565 Yapım
2014	Bir Pazar Kahvaltısı (featuring Model); DMC / 565 Yapım / GNL Entertainment
2016	Ölünmüyor; DMC
2016	Sen Beni Unutamazsın; DMC
2017	Beni Vurup Yerde Bırakma; DMC
2018	Ölüm Kalım Meselesi (feat. Yaprak Çamlıca); Wovie & DMC
2018	I Don't Wanna Fall Down; Hangar
2018	My Favourite Pain; Hangar
2018	Çocuğum Belki; Hangar
2019	Her Şey Biraz Hala Sen; Hangar
2019	Güllerim Soldu; Hangar
2020	Yalnızım Dostlarım; Hangar
2020	Ve Gülümse Şimdi (Acoustic); Hangar
2020	Yani (Acoustic); Hangar
2020	Bu Sefer Sorun Bende; Collabel
2020	Blame; Hangar
2021	Chasing Cars; Wava Stockholm
2021	Beni Anla; Hangar
2021	Hırka; Wovie
2021	Ratatan; Wava Stockholm
2022	Kör Kuyu; DMC
2022	Kırlangıç; Wovie
2022	Yansın (feat. Çağan Şengül); Sony
2022	Kuytu Köşelerde (Live) (feat. Şanışer); Collabel
2023	Fırtınam; DMC
2023	Hayaletler (feat. Vera); Vera
2024	Gidiyorum; DMC
2024	Herkes Mi Terk Etmiş; Sony
2025	Bir Şişe Kırmızı; Sony
2025	Son Yalancı; Sony

=== Chart positions ===
Album	Single	Peak position	
Album	Single	Turkey	Turkey Rock
Afili Yalnızlık	"Afili Yalnızlık"	1	1
Afili Yalnızlık	"Kim Dokunduysa Sana Ona Git"	4	1
Afili Yalnızlık	"Git"	4	1
Afili Yalnızlık	"Belki Bir Gün Özlersin"	6	1
Afili Yalnızlık	"Bu Kez Anladım"	12	1
Afili Yalnızlık	"Dayan Yalnızlığım"	12	1
Kağıt Evler	"Bu Yağmurlar"	1	1
Kağıt Evler	"Hoşçakal"	1	1
Kağıt Evler	"Son Defa"	2	1
Beni Biraz Böyle Hatırla	"Soğuk Odalar"	1	1
Beni Biraz Böyle Hatırla	"Beni Biraz Böyle Hatırla"	1	1
Eylül Geldi Sonra	"Eyvah"	3	1
Eylül Geldi Sonra	"Bitti Tebrikler"	—	1

== Awards ==
Emre Aydin's awards listed in timely order, international awards in bold:

- 10. Istanbul FM Gold Awards: Best Newcomer (En iyi çıkış)
- Blue Jean Magazin Best of 2006 Awards:
  - Best Song
  - Best Video (for Afili Yalızlık)
  - Best Newcomer
  - Best Producer (Haluk Kurosman)
- Dream Magazine Best of 2006 Awards:
  - Best Turkish Male Singer
  - Best Turkish New Singer
  - Best Turkish Album
  - Best Turkish Song
  - Best Turkish Video (for Afili Yalnızlık)
- Powertürk Music Awards
  - Best Newcomer (En İyi Çıkış Yapan Sanatçı)
- 34. Hürriyet Altın Kelebek Ödülleri (34th Golden Butterfly Awards)
  - Best Newcomer (En iyi çıkış yapan solist)
- 14. Altın Objektif Ödülleri 2006 (14. Golden Objective Awards 2006)
  - Yılın En İyi Çıkış Yapan Yorumcusu (The Best Newcoming Singer of the Year)
- 11. Istanbul FM Gold Awards 2007
  - Best rock male singer
  - Best song with best lyrics & music (together with Gripin for the song Sensiz İstanbul'a Düşmanım)
- Dream Magazine 2007 Awards
  - En İyi Erkek Sanatçı (Best male singer)
  - Yılın Yerli Şarkısı (Domestic Song of the Year): Git
  - Yılın Yerli Müzik Olayı (Domestic Music Event of the Year): Gripin-emreaydın: Sensiz İstanbul'a Düşmanım duet
- Dream TV 2007 Top 50 Songs
  - 3rd place: Gripin-emreaydın: Sensiz İstanbul'a Düşmanım (first among Turkish songs)
  - 38th place: Kim Dokunduysa Sana
- Powertürk Music Awards 2008
  - Best song: Gripin& emreaydın: Sensiz İstanbul'a Düşmanım
  - Best duet: Gripin& emreaydın: Sensiz İstanbul'a Düşmanım
- 14. Kral TV Video Müzik Ödülleri
  - Best Rock Singer
- 35. Altın Kelebek TV Yıldızları Ödülleri
  - Best Video: Belki Bir Gün Özlersin
- MTV Türkiye 2008
  - Best Turkish Act
- **MTV Europe Music Awards 2008**
  - Best European Act
- Blue Jean Magazine: The Best of 2008
  - Best male singer
- Türkiye Müzik Ödülleri : Turkish Music Awards
  - 2012 Year's Best Duet: Soğuk Odalar (Turkish Music Awards/ Türkiye Müzik Ödülleri)
  - 2012 Year's Best Single: Beni Biraz Böyle Hatırla (Turkish Music Awards/ Türkiye Müzik Ödülleri)

Awards and achievements
New title	Europe's Favourite Act in the MTV Europe Music Awards; 2008	Succeeded by (Turkey) maNga
