= Koray Avcı =

Koray Avcı may refer to:

- Koray Avcı (footballer)
- Koray Avcı (musician)
