= Hafif Müzik =

Studio album by Vega
- Released: 2005
- Recorded: GRGDN
- Genre: Rock, alternative
- Label: Sony BMG/GRGDN
- Producer: Tuğrul Akyüz, Serkan Hökenek

Vega chronology
Tatlı Sert (2002)	Hafif Müzik (2005)	Delinin Yıldızı (2017)

Hafif Müzik is the third album of Turkish alternative rock band Vega, released by Sony Music/GRGDN in 2005.

== Track listing ==
1. K-9
2. Elimde değil (Can't help it)
3. Serzenişte
4. Mendil (Handkerchief)
5. Yalnızca ben, yüzlerce sen (Me by myself, you a hundred times)
6. Uçları kırık (Broken ends)
7. Yok (Nope)
8. Hafif Müzik (Light Music)
9. Yanıyor Zaman
10. O şarkı (That song)
11. Sokaklar tekin değil (Not the streets)
12. Ankara

== Album information ==
=== Personnel ===
- Supervising producer: Hadi Elazzi, Selim Serezli
- Producer:Tuğrul Akyüz, Serkan Hökenek
- Arrangement:
  - Serkan Hökenek & Vega,
  - Serkan Hökenek & Haluk Kurosman (03)
- Recording: Haluk Kurosman, Serkan Hökenek
- Mastering Çağlar Türkmen (sestrem)
- Mix: Alp Turaç (atm)
  - Mix assistant: Erim Arkman (atm)
- Design: www.b-11.org
- Photography: Şafak Taner

=== Featured musicians ===
- Tuğrul Akyüz: guitar, bass guitar, keyboard, backing vocals
- Deniz Özbey: vocals
- Ilker Ölmez: Bass guitar (01, 04, 05, 07, 10)
