= Şişli (disambiguation) =

Şişli may refer to:

- Şişli, District of Istanbul
- Şişli Plaza, tower in Istanbul, Turkey and has 40 residential floors

== People with the surname ==
- Mehmet Şenol Şişli, Turkish rock musician
