= Voices.com =

Canadian based job search website

- Founded: 15 December 2003
- Headquarters: London, Ontario, Canada
- Area served: Global
- Founders: David Ciccarelli; Stephanie Ciccarelli
- Key people: Jay O'Connor (CEO); Dheeraj Jalali (CTO); Ruth Zive (CMO); Blake Hayward (VP), Sr. Vice President, Product; Ann Walton (VP), People and Operations; Colin McIlveen (VP), Customer Operations
- Industry: Media / Entertainment
- Products: Voice Over; Voice AI; Voice Data
- Revenue: $70 million (2025)
- Employees: 100+ (2025)
- Website: www.voices.com

Voices is a job search website focusing on voice actors and voice actor employers, headquartered in London, Ontario. The company has a user base of more than 500,000 registered individuals and companies, and is reportedly the largest business of its kind. In 2025, Voices.com had over 100 employees with clients and voice talent in 160 countries.

== History ==
Voices was founded in 2003 by husband and wife David and Stephanie Ciccarelli and was officially incorporated in 2004 in Ontario, Canada. Prior to founding the company, David studied audio engineering at the Ontario Institute of Audio Recording Technology, and operated a recording studio. Through the studio, Ciccarelli met his eventual wife, a musician and vocalist studying at University of Western Ontario. As his studio received more and more inquiries from actors looking for voiceover work, the pair saw the opportunity to connect the actors with businesses looking to hire voice talent and decided to focus on creating an online marketplace instead of producing content.

The original name for the business was Interactive Voices. Later, it purchased the website Voices for $30,000 from the medical journal Silencing the Critical Voices in Your Head. In 2006, the company's CEO was criticized for claiming that the Google radio ad product, was nearly identical to the one offered by Voices despite having not seen it. In 2011, the company moved its headquarters from Western University's research park to a larger space in downtown London, Ontario. From February to May 2013, the company participated in the Canadian Technology Incubator in Silicon Valley.

The Ciccarellis' book, Voice Acting for Dummies was published in 2013. In 2014, the company launched its first non-English site, for Spanish speakers in Latin America. That same year, the company began a $3.6 million expansion project supported by the Federal Economic Development Agency for Southern Ontario. In April 2015, Voices raised $2 million in funding from a division of the Business Development Bank of Canada. As part of the 2015 Canada Technology Accelerator, the company set up a temporary office in New York City. In 2016, the company relocated to a roughly 45,000 square foot location in downtown London, Ontario.

Voices raised $18 million in funding from Morgan Stanley Expansion Capital in July 2017. In August 2017, the company purchased the California-based Voicebank.net, an online casting and project management platform for an undisclosed amount. In September 2023, founder David Ciccarelli stepped down from his operating role and Jay O'Connor was named interim chief executive. Later, O'Connor was made permanent CEO, while Ciccarelli remains on the company's board.

== Overview ==
Voices is a platform that provides prices for different kinds of voice services, such as commercials or voicemail messages. Actors are not required to join a union to secure work on Voices and can audition for all jobs after joining the company's marketplace, however some of the clients seeking voice actors for national network campaigns, feature films, movie trailers and video game work require that talent joins the SAG-AFTRA union. It also has a library of articles to educate users about the voice acting industry and trends in the field. It allows employers in small markets to connect with voice actors in other regions, as well as connecting larger companies with voice actors. The site offers freelancers in more than 100 languages and dialects. Beside each freelancer's name there is a demo of the person's voice that employers can listen to. In May 2012, the website launched an app for iPad and iPhone devices, followed by the release of an app for Android devices in January 2013, both allowing job seekers to interact with potential employers directly over their mobile devices. The company added an app for the Apple watch in 2015. Clients that have worked with Voices.com include ESPN, PBS, The History Channel, Reader’s Digest, NBC, DreamWorks Animation, Sony, and Greer & Associates.

== Controversies and criticism ==
In 2015, Voices was accused by several voice actors of funneling client's budgets intended to pay the actor's fee to the company by installing an opaque system of "managed services" fees. Neither the talents nor the clients had been informed about how much of a given budget would be taken by Voices. In an interview with Graeme Spicer, David Ciccarelli finally admitted to this practice.
