= Kargo =

Turkish rock band

- Origin: Istanbul, Turkey
- Genres: Rock
- Years active: 1993–present
- Labels: Universal Music, Avrupa Müzik, Raks Müzik, Plaza Müzik
- Members: Koray Candemir (vocals) Selim Öztürk (guitar); Burak Karataş (drums); Mehmet Şenol Şişli (bass); Serkan Celikoz (keys)
- Past members: Deniz Aytekin (vocals); Fergan Mirkelam (vocals); Haluk Babadoğan – Vocals; Aykan İlkan(drums); Reha Hendem (vocals); Ozan Anlaş (vocals)
- Website: kargoonline.com

Kargo is a rock band from Istanbul, Turkey. Its current line-up includes Selim Öztürk on electric guitar, Burak Karataş on drums and Ozan Anlaş on vocals.

== Band members ==
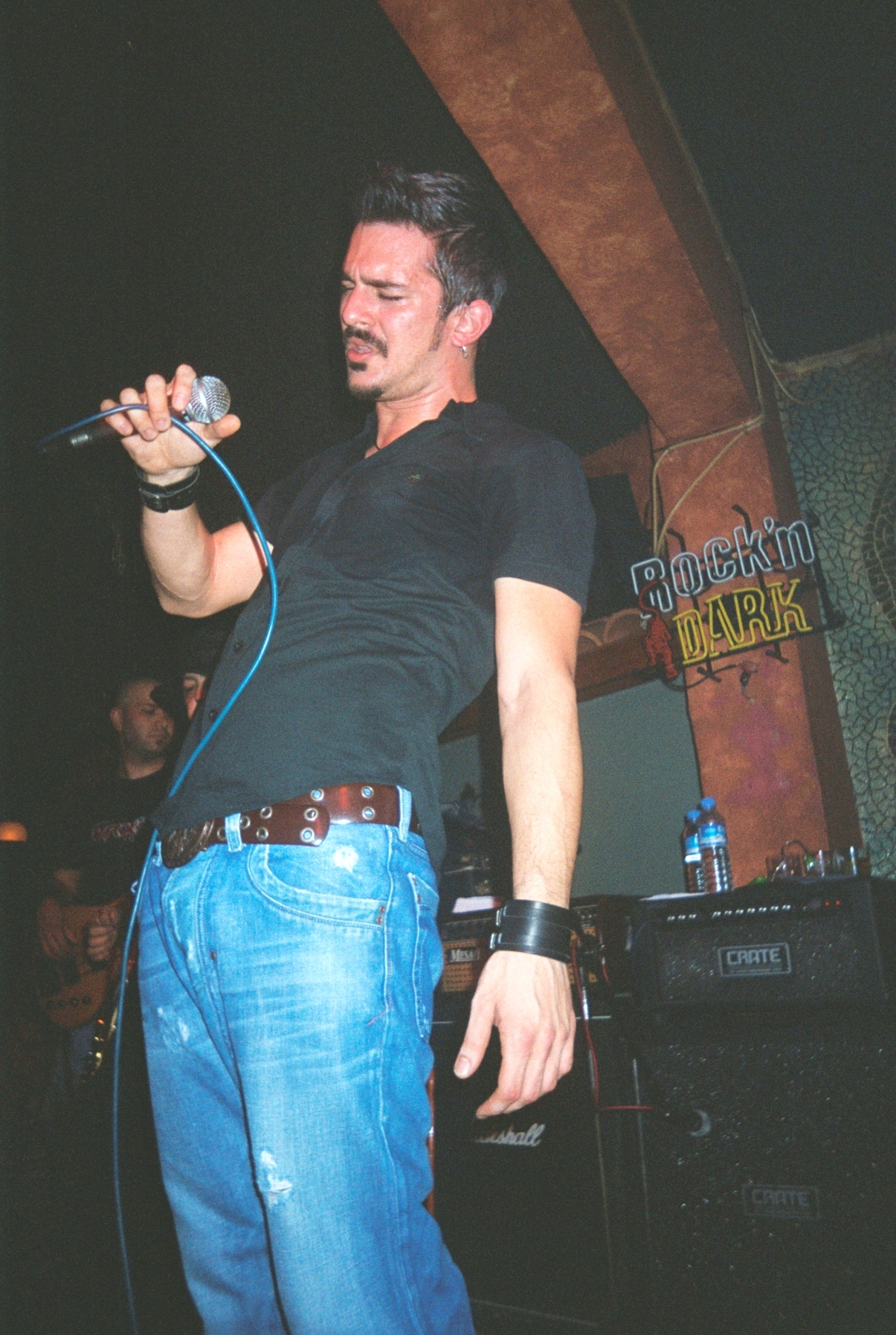
Koray Candemir, vocals

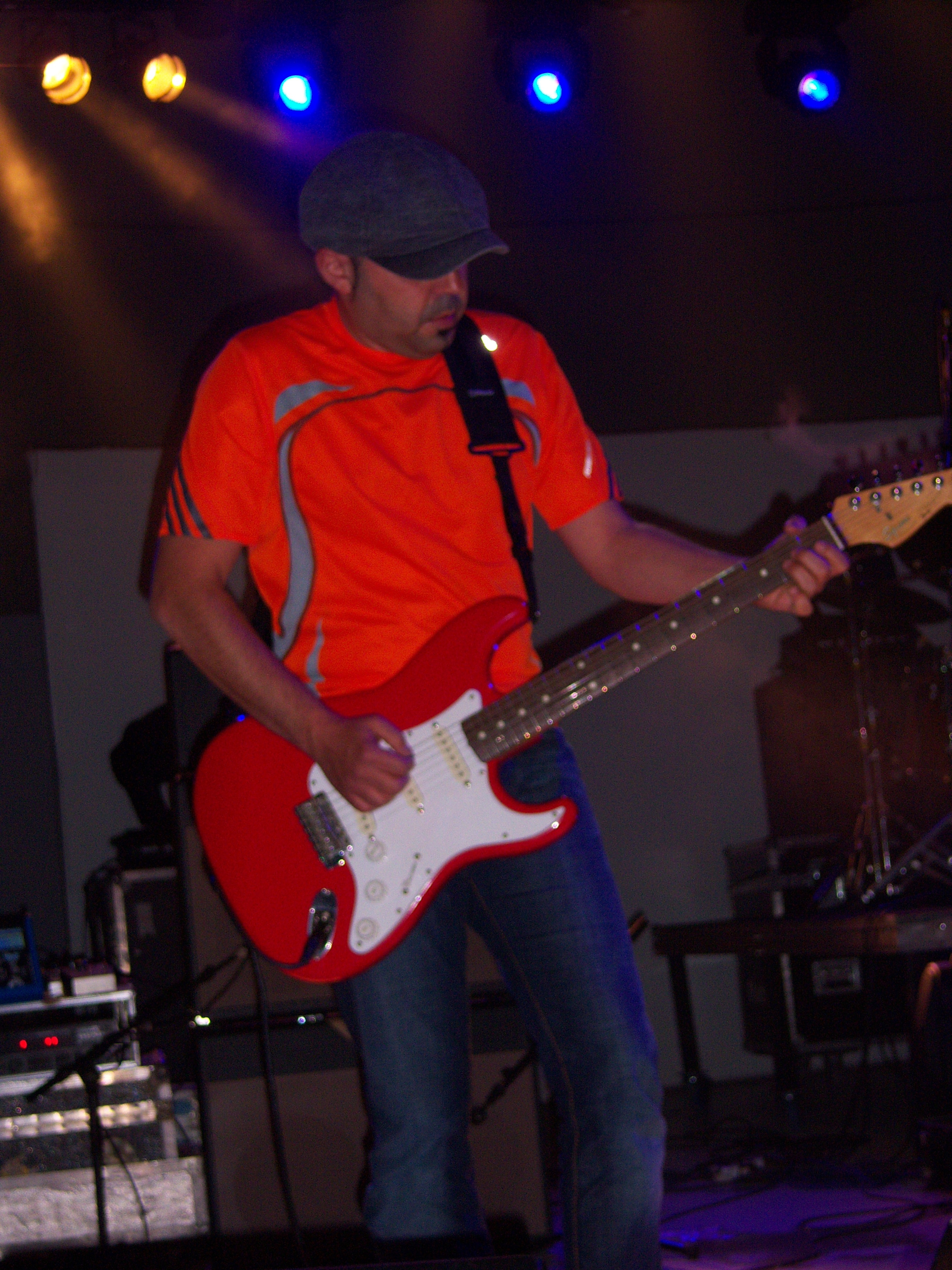
Selim Öztürk, guitar

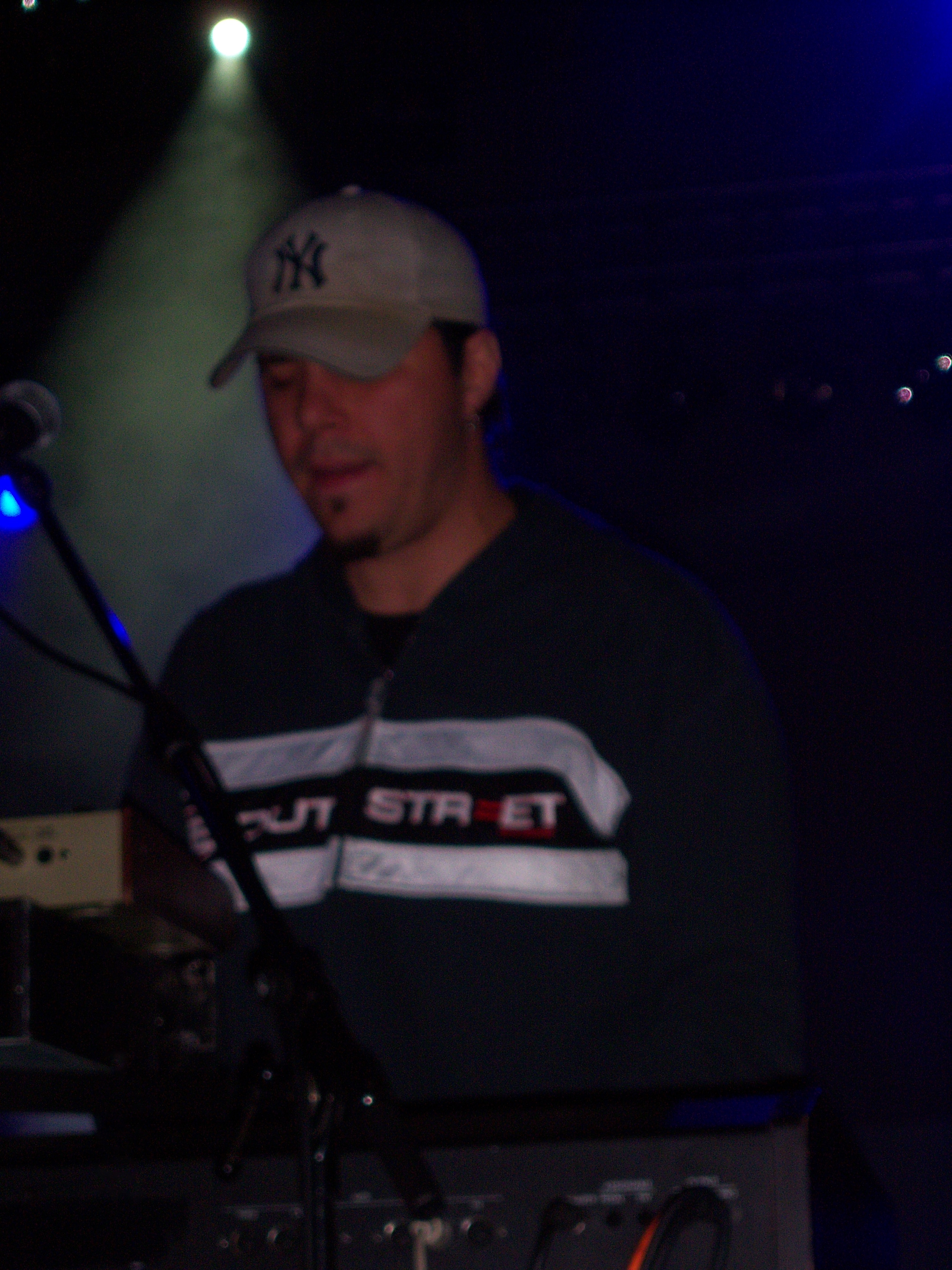
Serkan Çeliköz, keyboard

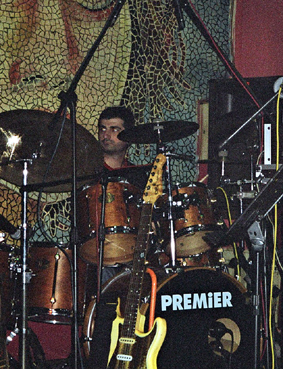
Burak Karataş, drums

=== Current members ===
- Koray Candemir – Vocals (1994–2008, 2024-)
- Serkan Çeliköz – Keyboard (1994–2008,2 024-)
- Selim Öztürk – Guitar (1993–present)
- Burak Karataş – Drums (1996–present)
- Mehmet Şenol Şişli – Bass guitar (1993–2001, 2008–2010, 2015–)

=== Former members ===
- Deniz Aytekin – Vocals (1993–1994)
- Aykan İlkan – Drums (1993–1994)
- Haluk Babadoğan – Vocals (2014–2016)
- Atilla Yüksel – Keyboard (1993–1994)
- Koray Candemir – Vocals (1994–2008)
- Serkan Çeliköz – Keyboard (1994–2008)
- Reha Hendem – Vocals (2008–2010)
- Ozan Anlaş – Vocals (2011–2014)

== Discography ==
=== Studio albums ===
- Sil Baştan (Start Over) (1993)
- Yarına Ne Kaldı (What Is Left For Tomorrow) (1996)
- Sevmek Zor (Loving is Hard) (1997)
- Yalnızlık Mevsimi (Season of Loneliness) (1998)
- Sen Bir Meleksin (You are an Angel) (2000)
- Ateş ve Su (Fire and Water) (2004)
- Gelecekle Randevum Var (2013)
- Değiştir Dünyayı (2016)

=== Other albums ===
- Best of Kargo (2001) - Compilation album
- Yıldızların Altında (Under the Stars) (2005) - Cover album
- RRDP (2010) - Mirkelam & Kargo split album

=== Singles ===
- Herkesin Geçtiği Yoldan Geçme (Don't Take Roads Taken by Everyone) (2000)
- Efes Dark CD (2000)
- Kehribar (2012)
- Mazi Kalbimde Bir Yaradır (2014) - (with Dilek Türkan)
