= Eylül Geldi Sonra =

2013 album by Emre Aydin

Studio album by Emre Aydın
- Released: 16 December 2013
- Recorded: 2013
- Genre: Pop rock; alternative rock
- Length: 40:56
- Language: Turkish
- Label: Doğan Music Company
- Producer: Mats Valentin, Mustafa Ceceli

Emre Aydın chronology
Kağıt Evler (2010)	Eylül Geldi Sonra (2013)	Bir Pazar Kahvaltısı (2015)

Eylül Geldi Sonra (September Arrived Afterwards) is the third studio album by Turkish singer Emre Aydın. It was released on 16 December 2013 by Doğan Music Company. Three years after the release of his previous album, Kağıt Evler, a teaser for his new album was released on 22 November 2013 and it was eventually made available on 16 December. The album was produced by Mats Valentin and Mustafa Ceceli, and recorded at Mr Radar Music Studios in Stockholm, Sweden.

== About the album ==
Emre Aydın described this album as his best-selling album up to that date. After creating the song "Akşamlarda Parmak İzlerin", Aydın discovered a resemblance between his song and Sezen Aksu's "El Gibi". After a meeting with Aksu to discuss the issue, it was mentioned in the album that "Akşamlarda Parmak İzlerin" came to existence under inspiration from one of Sezen Aksu's pieces.

== Music videos ==
The music video for the album's lead single, "Eyvah", was directed by Ulaş Ergin and published the day after the album's release. In an interview with NTV's program Gece Gündüz, Aydın stated that the album's first music video would be made for the song "Akşamda Parmak İzleri", however, upon the suggestion of his producer Samsun Demir, he said that he had chosen "Eyvah" to be made into a music video first. The album's second music video was prepared for the song "Bitti Tebrikler". It was shot in Üsküdar over the course of 16 hours and directed by Emre Aydın himself. "Ses Ver" was the third song from the album to be turned into a music video. It was released on 6 April 2015.

== Track listing ==
#	Song	Music	Lyrics	Length
1	Akşamlarda Parmak İzlerin	Emre Aydın	Emre Aydın	4:05
2	Geceler Kara Tren	Nazan Öncel	Nazan Öncel	4:09
3	Eyvah	Shimon Buslika	Emre Aydın	4:36
4	Bitti Tebrikler	Emre Aydın	Emre Aydın	4:03
5	Buralar Yalan	Emre Aydın	Emre Aydın	4:29
6	Eylül	Emre Aydın	Emre Aydın	3:47
7	Belalım	Zülfü Livaneli	Sezen Aksu, Zülfü Livaneli	4:27
8	Ses Ver	Emre Aydın	Emre Aydın	4:34
9	Artık Özlemek İstemiyorum	Emre Aydın	Emre Aydın	3:05
10	Sen Gitme	Emre Aydın	Emre Aydın	3:41

== Sales ==
Country	Sales
Turkey (MÜ-YAP)	40,000
