= Hadi Elazzi =

Turkish music producer and manager

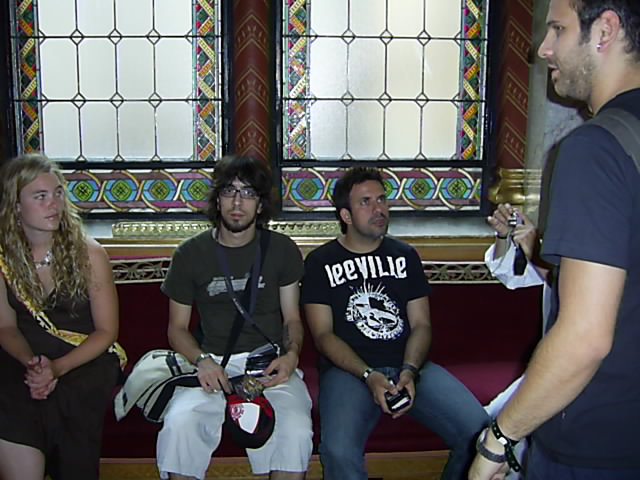
Yağmur Sarıgül guitarist and Hadi Elazzi (sitting in the middle from left to right) and Cem Bahtiyar bass player (standing on the right) in the Parliament of Hungary, August 2006

Hadi Nabil Elazzi (born December 7, 1973, Istanbul) is one of the founders of Turkish music production-management company and record label GRGDN. He was the manager of several renown Turkish artists like maNga, Gripin, Göksel, emreaydın and Vega.

== Early years ==
Hadi Elazzi was born into a mixed family-a Turkish mother and a Lebanese father. In 1993 he was among the founders of the first university radio in Turkey, radyo boğaziçi, the radio station of Boğaziçi University, which he studied at. During his university years he worked for several Turkish radio stations including Radio Contact, Metro FM, Show Radyo, Radyo 5.

After finishing university he decided to move to the United States and started attending music administration classes at the University of California, Los Angeles in 1997. In the same year he started working for Sire Records (Warner Music) in the marketing department. In 1999 he returned to Istanbul to work for Sony Music Turkey as a product manager. After Sony, he fulfilled the role of the marketing manager of BMG Müzik Türkiye. He was also employed at DMC Müzik and Balet Plak at a later time. During his career he had worked with such artists like Gloria Estefan, Ricky Martin, Chumbawamba, Lou Bega, Apollo 440, Jon Secada, Morcheeba, Steve Vai or Eros Ramazzotti.

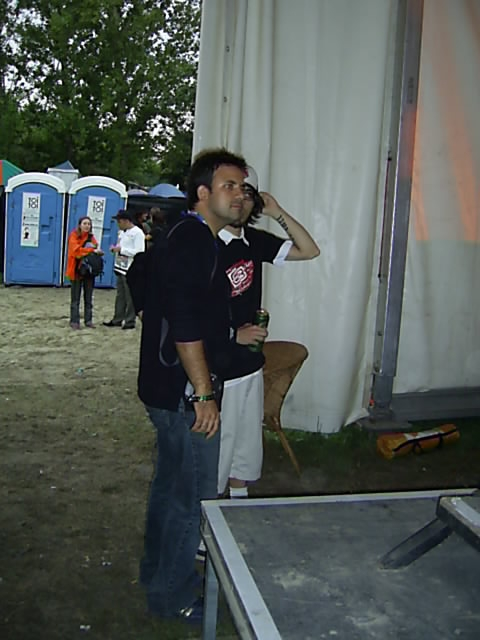
Hadi Elazzi backstage; WAN2 stage at the Sziget Festival in Hungary, 2006

== GRGDN ==
In 2003 he founded his own company, GRGDN, together with his childhood friend Haluk Kurosman. While Kurosman supervised the recordings (including mixing, editing as well as songwriting), Elazzi was responsible for the management and marketing of GRGDN artists. As an independent label they published the first album of Gripin, titled Hikayeler Anlatıldı. Later they joined up with Sony Music and continue publishing audio CDs in cooperation with Sony.

Hadi Elazzi has become a widely acknowledged name in the Turkish music industry, giving his name to several projects outside of his own company's. For example, he was one of the jury members of the talent competition Battle of the Bands, and gave advice for a music competition organized for university students, called UniStar.

He also taught music administration at the Galatasaray Communications, Technology and Music Academy.
