= Batu Akdeniz =

Turkish rock musician

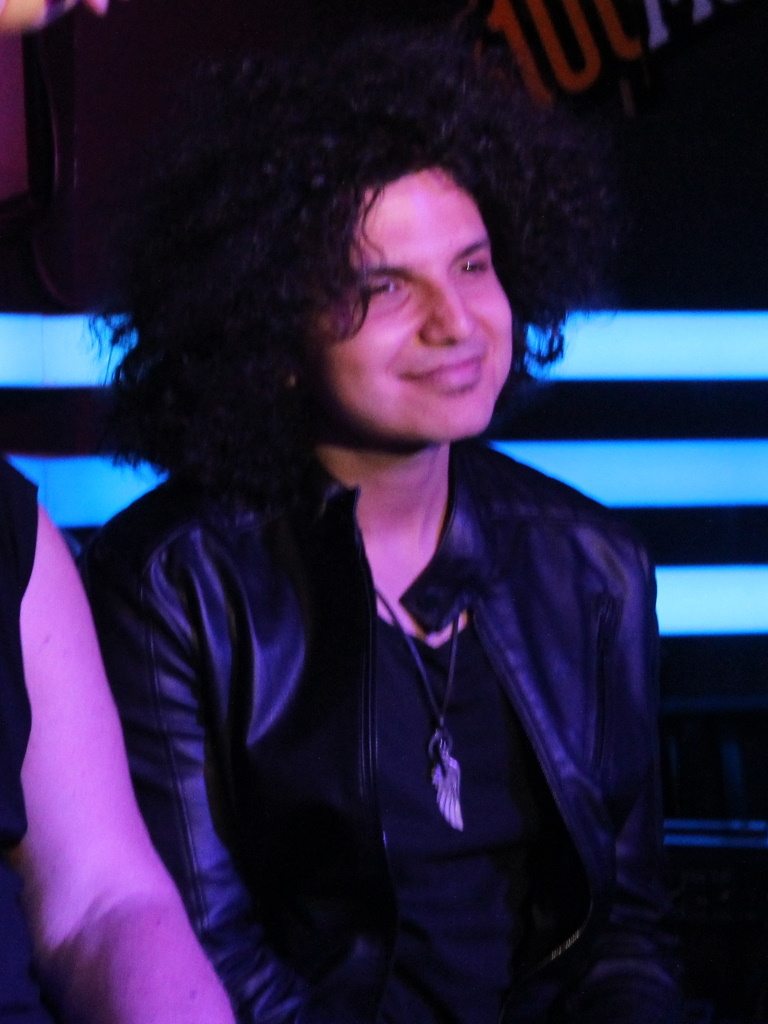

Background information
- Born: 29 June 1993 (age 33); Ankara, Turkey
- Genres: Rock; alternative
- Occupation: Musician
- Years active: 2017–present

Batu Akdeniz (born 29 June 1993) is a Turkish rock musician. He is known for both his solo works and his collaborations with the Heavy Sky band.

His interest in music started at a young age and he later joined the Ankara Polyphonic Music Association Choir. In 2012, he founded the rock band Heavy Sky with Çağlar Töngür and Hakan Kılıç. With new members joining, the band took its final shape a year later. The band, which performs English rock music, released their album Dreamer in 2016. Akdeniz has also published videos on YouTube. After 2017, he started to write Turkish songs. Hayat Böyle was his first solo album, which featured rock and electronic music elements. In 2020, he was one of the guest artists on the Murathan Mungan tribute album 2020 Model.

== Discography ==
EPs

- Hayat Böyle (2018)
- Yarın Yokmuş Gibi (2020)

Singles

- "Yanlış Biriyle Doğru Hikaye" (2019)
- "Hareket Vakti" (2019)
- "Vuruldum" (2019)
- "Eksik" (2020)
- "Vurdum Kendimi Yola" (with Barış Kocatürk) (2021)
- "Bir Sebebi Var" (2020)
- "Ona Gitme" (2021)
- "Unutmadım Bizi" (2021)
- "Elde Kaldı İki Yalnız" (with Aleyna Talınlı) (2021)
- "Katiller Cenazede" (2021)
- "Bul Kendini" (with Canozan and Ufuk Kevser) (2021)
- "Başka Bir Gün" (with Pamela) (2021)
