= Kağıt Evler =

2010 album by Emre Aydın

Studio album by Emre Aydın
- Released: 1 April 2010
- Studio: Mr Radar Music Studios
- Genre: Pop rock, alternative rock
- Length: 39:00
- Language: Turkish
- Label: Sony Music
- Producer: Mats Valentin

Emre Aydın chronology
Afili Yalnızlık (2006)	Kağıt Evler (2010)	Eylül Geldi Sonra (2013)

Singles from Kağıt Evler
- 1. "Bu Yağmurlar" Released: 15 March 2010

Professional ratings
Review scores
Source	Rating
Gerçek Pop	4/5 stars
Müzik Gazetesi	4/5 stars

Kağıt Evler (Paper Houses) is the second studio album by Turkish singer Emre Aydın. It was released on 1 April 2010. The album was produced by Mats Valentin Production and recorded at Mr Radar Music Studios in Sweden.

As to why the album was titled Kağıt Evler, Aydın said: "I looked for a metaphor that was difficult to make, but easy to build. The lyrical concept of the album is about forgetting. Forgetting has always seemed to be like that for me; you forget something you do with a hard labor, you actually think that you've forgot it; then something happens, anything; the things you think you've forgot, start to haunt you one by one. Your paper house collapses." Except Cemali's song, Duymak İstiyorum, all of the songs in the album were written and composed by Aydın himself, similar to his previous album. The album was successful on digital platforms and sold 65,000 copies by the end of 2010, becoming the 10th best-selling album of the year in Turkey.

Kağıt Evler was Emre Aydın's last album to be released by Sony Music.

== Music videos ==
Centered around the concept of forgetting, the album's lead single, "Bu Yağmurlar", was produced by İskender Paydaş and Mats Valentin. Two child actors appeared alongside Emre Aydın on the song's music video. It was recorded at a specially created plateau in Çatalca over the course of 20 hours and under the direction of Murad Küçük. It became the most-streamed music video at the time and topped the radio and television charts. The second music video, "Alıştım Susmaya", was again directed by Murad Küçük. The album's third music video, "Hoşçakal", was recorded over the course of 24 hours by a team of 40 people. It was directed by Cemil Ağacıkoğlu and succeeded in occupying the first position on digital platforms. The fourth music video, "Son Defa", was shot in London and directed by Serdar Ferit. A number of English actors appeared in the video, which was recorded in 2 days. Ceyda Sarıhan directed the fifth music video, "Tam Dört Yıl Olmuş Dün". Its shooting lasted 15 hours.

== Track listing ==
#	Song	Music	Lyrics	Length
1	Bu Yağmurlar	Emre Aydın	Emre Aydın	3:53
2	Alıştım Susmaya	Emre Aydın	Emre Aydın	4:10
3	Hoşçakal	Emre Aydın	Emre Aydın	3:48
4	Tam Dört Yıl Olmuş Dün	Emre Aydın	Emre Aydın	3:57
5	Duymak İstiyorum	Ali Tosun, İsmail Tosun	Ali Tosun, İsmail Tosun	3:43
6	Ayrı Ayrı	Emre Aydın	Emre Aydın	4:09
7	Kimse Olmadı Senin Gibi	Emre Aydın	Emre Aydın	4:03
8	Geniş Zamanlar Yok	Emre Aydın	Emre Aydın	3:54
9	Son Defa	Emre Aydın	Emre Aydın	3:55
10	Kağıt Evler	Emre Aydın	Emre Aydın	3:28
