= Kenan Hulusi Koray =

Turkish writer (1906–1943)

- Born: 1906; Istanbul, Ottoman Empire
- Died: 23 May 1943 (aged 37); Adapazarı, Turkey
- Education: Istanbul University
- Occupation: Writer,
- Writing career
- Language: Turkish
- Period: Republican period Turkish literature

Kenan Hulusi Koray (1906 – 23 May 1943) was a Turkish writer.

== Biography ==
He was born in 1906 in Istanbul. He graduated from Istanbul Kabatas High School. He started to study at Istanbul University Faculty of Letters. He stepped into the world of literature with the stories he published in the magazine Servet-i Fünun. In 1928, he was the only story writer among the Seven Torches. He started journalism at Vakit in 1934 and soon became the editor-in-chief of the newspaper. He died of typhus in 1943 while he was doing his military service as a reserve officer in Adapazarı.

== Bibliography ==
Compiling, reprinting, etc. of books published after his death.

- Osmanoflar (roman) (1938, 2004)
- RBK Pansiyonu (1938)(yazı dizisi, kitabı basılmamıştır.)
- Yedi Meşale (ortak kitap) (1928)
- Bir Yudum Su (öykü)(1929)
- Bahar Hikâyeleri (öykü) (1939)
- Son Öpüş (1939)
- Bir Otelde Yedi Kişi (öykü)(1940)
- Bir Yudum Su (öykü)1929,1944)
- Kenan Hulusi-Hikâyeler" (1973)
- Beşer Dakikalık Hikâyeler (2000)
- Yaz ve Aşk Hikâyeleri (Ekim 2004-Derleme)
- Miras Keçe (2009)
