= Ontario Institute of Audio Recording Technology =

Coordinates: 42.9352°N 81.2055°W

O.I.A.R.T. Incorporated
- Type: Career College
- Established: 1983
- Location: London, Ontario, Canada
- Website: https://www.oiart.org/

The Ontario Institute of Audio Recording Technology (OIART) is a privately operated career college in London, Ontario, Canada which is registered with and under the jurisdiction of the Superintendent of Career Colleges in Ontario. OIART provides basic common training for a variety of sound-related jobs, in the form of an 11 month course. Graduates of the course receive a diploma in Audio Recording Technology as they join a vast network of alumni, including Rob Nokes of Sounddogs, Alexandre Bonenfant, and David Ciccarelli of Voices.com. OIART boasts a 100% job placement rate, according to their own KPI survey results.

== Curriculum ==
The course is divided into three semesters, during which students are assessed using closed-book examinations, practical examinations, and media-creation assignments. Professional instructors deliver lectures, while recent graduates oversee studio use and assist with the completion of assignments.

In the first semester, OIART offers introductory classes for music production, pro tools, computers, acoustics, sound for film productions, and sound for live music concerts. Students are expected to behave as working studio technicians while using OIART equipment.

In the second semester, students work in groups to operate OIART's studios and complete a single for a local songwriter, often sourced from the local alternative music scene which is sustained by the large amount of student musicians at the University of Western Ontario and Fanshawe College.

In the third semester, students choose to complete a focused project in music production, live sound, or audio for visual media with the assistance of an instructor. The music production assignment requires the completion of two more songs, and the live sound assignment might be volunteering at Sunfest.

== See also ==
- Fanshawe College's Music Industry Arts program
- Don Wright Faculty of Music
