= Koray Avcı (musician) =

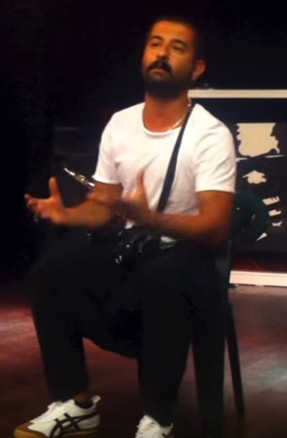

Background information
- Born: 1 January 1990 (age 36); Ankara, Turkey
- Genres: Pop, folk, Sufi
- Occupations: Musician, singer-songwriter
- Instruments: Clarinet, guitar
- Years active: 2015–present
- Label: DSM
- Website: korayavci.com.tr

Koray Avcı (born 1 January 1990) is a Turkish singer.

== Life and career ==
Koray Avcı was born in Ankara to a family that was originally from Tercan. His father died in 2021 from heart and kidney failure.

In 2008, he was enrolled in Muğla University School of Arts and Sciences to study physics. In 2010 and while still studying in Muğla, he took part in Yetenek Sizsiniz Türkiye, where he famously imitated Volkan Konak and got to the second round. Upon his graduation in 2012, he returned to Ankara and started performing music on the streets. In the same year, he rose to prominence after a video of him singing at a metro station was shared on social media. He released his first studio album Aşk İle in 2015, which topped the sales charts in Turkey. Its lead single "Sen" garnered over 200 million views on YouTube. The album consisted of a number of new songs as well as covers. The album's success led to the release of other studio albums in the following years, including Sonra Dersin Ki in 2016, Senin İçin Değer in 2018, and Seni Çok Özlüyorum in 2020.

== Discography ==
=== Studio albums ===
Year	Title	Label
2015	Aşk İle	Dokuz Sekiz Müzik
2016	Sonra Dersin Ki	Dokuz Sekiz Müzik
2018	Senin İçin Değer	Dokuz Sekiz Müzik
2020	Seni Çok Özlüyorum	Koray Avcı

=== Singles ===
Year	Title	Label
2016	"Hoş Geldin"	Dokuz Sekiz Müzik
2019	"Kim Bilir"	Dokuz Sekiz Müzik
2019	"Yuh Yuh"	Dokuz Sekiz Müzik
2021	"Sarhoş Gibiyim"	Dokuz Sekiz Müzik
2022	"Yeter"	Koray Avcı
2022	"Masum Değiliz"	Koray Avcı

=== As featured artist ===
Year	Title	Album	Label
2016	"Bizim Sokaklar"	Unutulmayan Şarkılar	Poll Production
2017	"Dargın Mahkum"	Mahzuni'ye Saygı	Arda Müzik
2018	"Ummadığım Anda"	Yıldız Tilbe'nin Yıldızlı Şarkıları	Özdemir Müzik
2018	"Erkekler de Yanar"	Ve Nazan Öncel Şarkıları	Doğan Music Company

=== Music videos ===
Year	Title	Album	Director
2015	"Sen"	Aşk İle	Hasan Kuyucu
2016	"Hoş Geldin"	Non-album single	Hasan Kuyucu
2016	"Dertliyim Bu Gece"	Aşk İle	Hasan Kuyucu
2016	"Aşk Sana Benzer"	Sonra Dersin Ki	Hasan Kuyucu
2016	"Yanımda Sen Olmayınca"	Sonra Dersin Ki	Hasan Kuyucu
2017	"Yakarım Geceleri"	Sonra Dersin Ki	İmre Haydaroğlu
2017	"Hangimiz Sevmedik"	Sonra Dersin Ki	İmre Haydaroğlu
2017	"Diz Dize"	Sonra Dersin Ki	İmre Haydaroğlu
2017	"Unutamam Seni"	Sonra Dersin Ki	İmre Haydaroğlu
2018	"Pirlere Niyaz Ederiz"	Aşk İle	İmre Haydaroğlu
2018	"Senin İçin Değer"	Senin İçin Değer	Kemal Başbuğ
2018	"Adaletin Bu mu Dünya"	Senin İçin Değer	İmre Haydaroğlu
2018	"Ben Ne Biçim Serseriyim"	Senin İçin Değer	İmre Haydaroğlu
2018	"Yine Aylardan Kasım"	Senin İçin Değer	Korhan Bozkurt
2019	"Kim Bilir"	Non-album single	Hasan Kuyucu
2019	"Yuh Yuh"	Non-album single	İmre Haydaroğlu
2020	"Gidiyorum"	Seni Çok Özlüyorum	İmre Haydaroğlu
2021	"Sarhoş Gibiyim"	Non-album single	Said Dağdeviren, İdil Dizdar
