= Pamela Spence =

Turkish-English pop-rock singer (born 1973)

Pamela
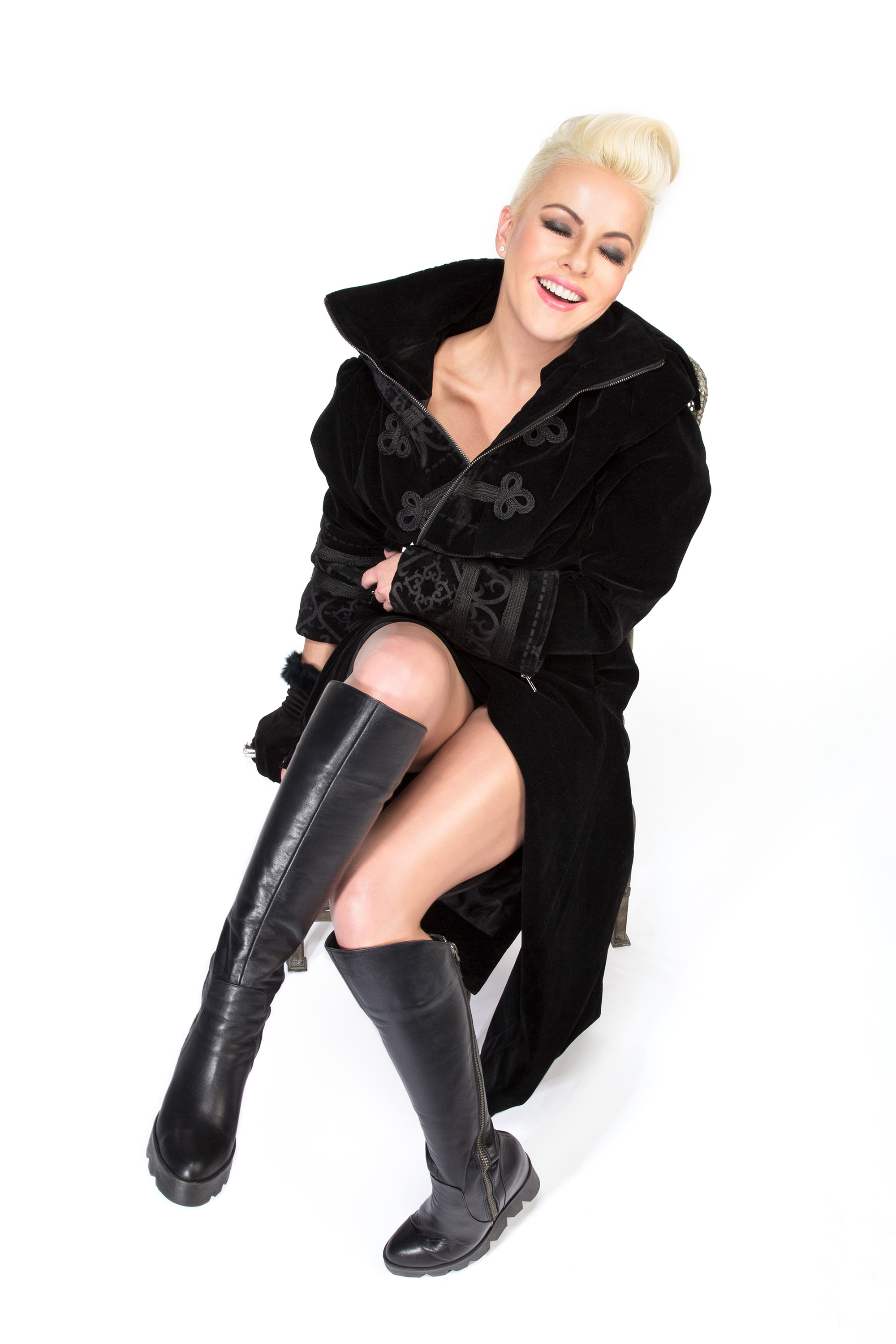

Background information
- Born: Pamela Aslı Spence; 25 February 1973 (age 53); Heidelberg, Germany
- Origin: English-Turkish
- Genres: Pop rock, pop punk, synthpop
- Occupations: Singer, actress
- Instruments: Vocals, Guitar
- Years active: 1994–present
- Website: pamelaspence.com

Pamela Aslı Spence (born 25 February 1973) is a Turkish-English pop-rock singer and actress.

Born to an English father and a Turkish mother, she sings in Turkish, which she learned at the age of 15. She has also collaborated with a number of other Turkish singers and performed in several musicals.

Spence studied Theater Arts at the Ankara State Conservatory. At the age of 19, she had a short-lived marriage to actor Burak Sergen. She was first noticed by critics in a musical version of They Shoot Horses, Don't They? staged in Turkey, where she had acted alongside actors Okan Bayülgen and Fikret Kuşkan. She then starred in TV miniseries such as Lahmacun ve Pizza, and took part in Teoman's group of vocalists.

Her first album, Eğer Dinlersen, was the product of a long period of preparation. With the songs in her second album, Şehir Rehberi, she used a style that was closer to rock music, as opposed to the pop notes of her first album. One of the songs from her second album, "İstanbul", attracted great public attention. In May 2006, she produced her third album, Cehennet.

== Discography ==
=== Studio albums ===
- 2002: Eğer Dinlersen (English: If You'll Listen)
- 2004: Şehir Rehberi (English: City Guide)
- 2006: Cehennet (a blend word combining the words "cehennem" - hell and "cennet"- paradise)
- 2010: Stil Zengini (English: Style-rich)
- 2018: Yara (English: Wound)

=== Single ===
- 2013: "Aç"
- 2015: "Aslanlar Gibi"
- 2020: "Dayanamıyorum" (Attila Özdemiroğlu Besteleri)
- 2021: "Benimle Kal" (Çelik Şarkıları)
- 2021: "Her Şeye Rağmen" (with Mehmet Güreli)
- 2021: "Başka Bir Gün" (with Batu Akdeniz)
- 2022: "Yedikule" (Yeni Türkü Zamansız)

== Filmography ==
- 2015: Acil Aşk Aranıyor - Herself
- 2011: +18 - Hayal
- 2010: Vay Arkadaş - Sevtap
- 2008: Avrupa Yakası - Herself
- 2008: Pulsar - Pussy Girl
- 2007: Kelebek Çıkmazı - Lale
- 2007: Ters Yüz - Ayşe
- 2007: Gönül Salıncağı - Aslı
- 2005: Tombala - Derya
- 2004: Mucizeler Komedisi - Female Angel
- 2004: Sil Baştan
- 2004: Mars Kapıdan Baktırır - Nazlı
- 2003: Büyümüş de Küçülmüş - Nazlı
- 2002: Lahmacun ve Pizza - Tuğçegül
- 2002: Ti Show - Female Robot
- 2000: Ruhsar - Girl
- 1999: 5 Maymun Çetesi - Kelly
- 1997: Ruhsar - Tomris
