= Koray Candemir =

Turkish musician

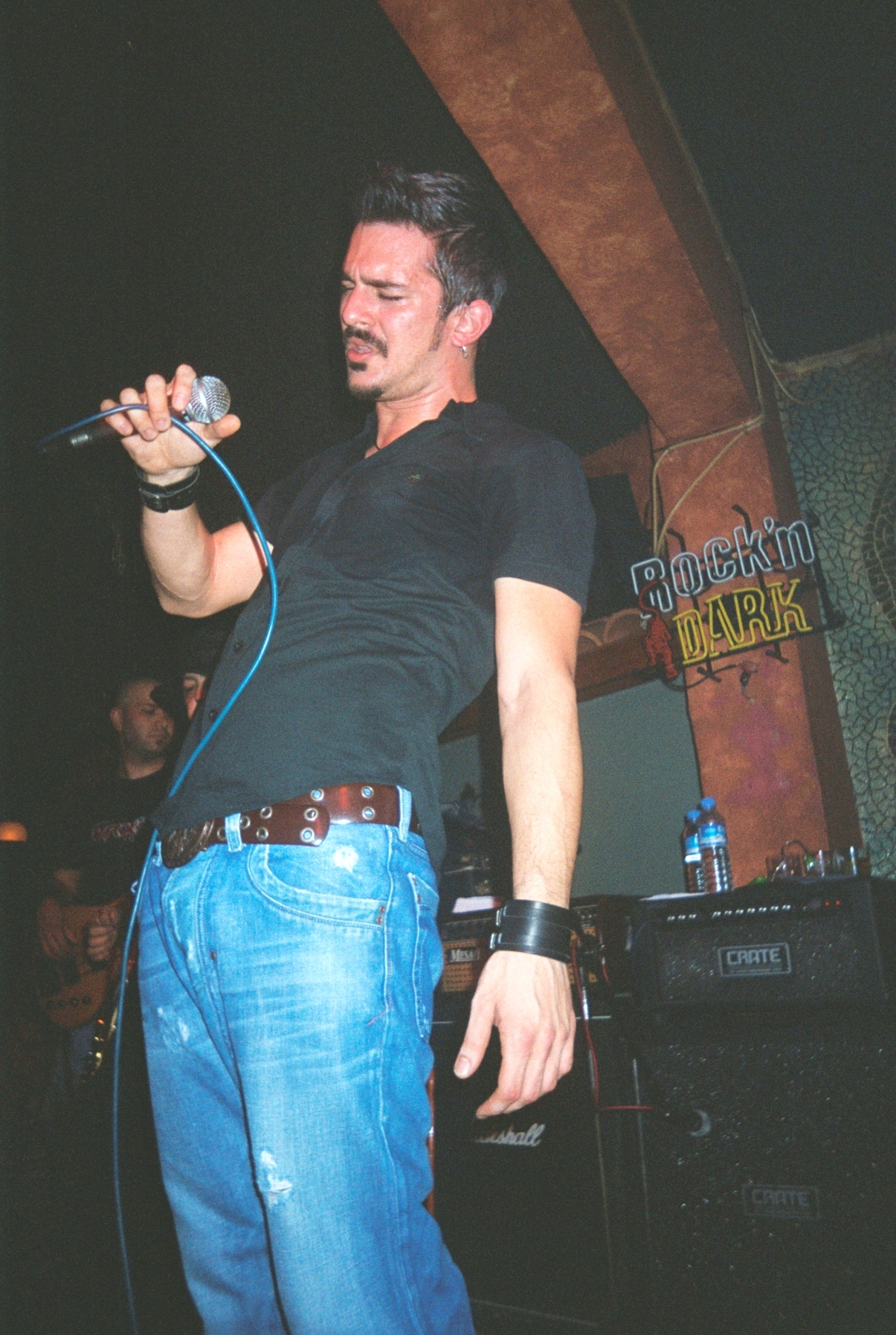

Background information
- Born: Orçun Koray Candemir; Istanbul, Turkey
- Genres: Rock
- Occupations: Singer, song-writer, producer
- Years active: 1990s–present
- Formerly of: Kargo
- Website: koraycandemir.com

Koray Candemir is a Turkish musician, songwriter, and record producer. He used to be the lead singer of the Turkish rock band Kargo. Towards the end of 2008, Koray Candemir and Serkan Celikoz decided to end their involvement with Kargo, due to vision and opinion differences with the other members of Kargo. They formed their new band which is named 'maSKott'. They are currently in Seattle working on their new projects and released their debut album in 2010. Besides singing, Koray also plays the guitar in Kargo and maSKott.

== Music career ==
Candemir's career in music began with his high school band which won several awards from “Milliyet Liselerarasi Muzik Yarismasi” (Milliyet High Schools Music Contest). After graduating from high school Koray Candemir began performing at local music clubs. In 1994, after hearing him perform, Selim Ozturk and Mehmet Senol Sisli invited Koray to join Kargo as the lead singer. In 1996, Kargo released their debut-album “Yarina Ne Kaldi? (What is left for tomorrow?) The album was an instant success, making Kargo the most popular rock band and Koray Candemir one of the most recognizable faces in Turkey.

He released four more albums with Kargo during 1997–2000, Sevmek Zor (Love is Hard), Yalnizlik Mevsimi (Season of Loneliness), Sen Bir Meleksin (You are an Angel) and Best of Kargo. All of these albums helped to increase the popularity of Kargo and Koray Candemir. After the best of album was released, Kargo decided to go their separate ways for a while to focus on their personal projects. During this time Candemir took steps towards a solo career, with the release of his debut solo effort “Sade” (Simple) in 2001.

In 2002 Candemir surprised his fans as he took the role of presenter on the “Sing Your Song” (Sarkini Soyle) music contest which aired on Show TV. Later in 2005 Candemir provided his support and back-vocals for the debut album of Manga, the runner up of “Sing Your Song” music contest.

After a three-year hiatus, Kargo regrouped in 2003 to begin work on their next studio album. Their 2004 release “Ates ve Su” (Fire and Water) was welcomed by the fans with great interest. In 2005 Candemir showed this expertise in music as he was one of the jury members in “iCan Film, Muzik ve Tasarim” (iCan Movie, Music and Design by Apple Computers) contest. In 2005, Candemir released “Yildizlarin Altinda” (Under the Stars) with Kargo. This album consisted of covers of Turkish rock and pop songs and became instant success selling over 100,000 copies. With the success of “Yildizlarin Altinda” Kargo toured Turkey, performing more than 100 concerts in a year, which became the second highest number of concerts played by a Turkish rock artist. In 2007 for the first time Candemir took on the role of producer on debut album of G.E.C.E., a Turkish Rock Band. G.E.C.E.’s debut album was released in May 2008.

== Working with other Turkish artists ==
Koray Candemir has also worked with several Turkish artists throughout his career. Candemir rerecorded “Sairin Elinde” (In the Hands of the Poet), a major Kargo hit with Athena, a Turkish ska band, in 1998. That same year he also worked with Sebnem Ferah, who is one of the best known female rock artists in Turkey, at yet another Kargo hit “Kalamis Parki” (Kalamış Park). In 2005 Candemir sang back vocals for “Kal Yanimda” (Stay With Me) by Manga, Turkish nu metal/rap core band. In 2006, he recorded “Yeniden Gelsem Dunyaya” for the tribute album for Tanju Eren and “Belki bir gun” (Maybe One Day) for “Barda” (At The Bar) movie soundtrack.

== Commercials ==
Candemir's popularity is also recognized by many Turkish and international companies. As a result, he starred in many commercials which includes Dr. Renaud Paris (1999), Axess Card (2001), Halk Gofret (2006) and Coca-Cola (2007). In addition to these commercials with his band Kargo, he participated in Casio (1997), Efes Dark (2000) and Jacobs Coffee (2008) commercial campaigns.

== Acting work ==
Candemir is a credited actor in His Secret Life movie directed by Turkish-Italian director Ferzan Özpetek. His role required him to learn Italian. In 2004, it was announced that he would play the lead character of Niko in “Yabancı Damat” (Foreign Groom) TV series. Later on Candemir dropped out of the TV series as his touring schedule with Kargo would not allow him to be committed to this project.

== Discography ==
With Kargo

Solo

- Sade (2001)
1. "Nefesini Tut" (Hold your breath) (3:57)
2. "İçini Dök" (Tell what's on your mind) (4:30)
3. "Eskisi Gibi Olmaz" (Can't be like before) (3:31)
4. "Sade" (Simple) (3:45)
5. "Aşk" (Love) (4:24)
6. "Gerçek Acıtır" (Truth hurts) (4:08)
7. "Herşey Yalan" (Everything's a lie) (3:19)
8. "Seni Sevmesem" (If I didn't love you) (3:29)
9. "Kuyunun Dibinde" (At the bottom of a well) (4:01)
10. "Ailemin Yanında Dururken" (While standing by my family) (3:09)
11. "Seni Sevmesem" (enst.) (If I didn't love you - Instrumental) (8:49)
- Yarım Kalan (2013)
1. "Kalan Giden Benim"
2. "Son Durak"
3. "Yakın"
4. "Kar"
5. "Yeni Bir Gün"
6. "Keklik İdim Vurdular"
7. "Bu Şehirde"
8. "Ruhum Ayakta"
9. "Karagözyaşı"
10. "Akreple Yelkovan"
11. "Bırak Zaman Aksın"
- SON (2016)
1. "Son" (3:40)
- İhtimaller (2020)
1. "İhtimaller" (Possibilities)(3:43)

With Maskott

Tuval (2010)

== Filmography ==
- Fate ignoranti, Le 2001
  International English title:The Ignorant Fairies
  USA title: His Secret Life
  Director: Ferzan Özpetek
  Genre: Drama

== See also ==
- Anatolian rock
- Music of Turkey
- Sezen Aksu
- Tarkan
