= Hikayeler Anlatıldı =

Studio album by Gripin
- Genre: Alternative
- Label: GRGDN
- Producer: Haluk Kurosman

Hikayeler Anlatıldı is the first album by the Turkish rock group Gripin, released in 2004 by GRGDN. It was later re-released as Hikayeler Anlatıldı 2 by Sony Music/GRGDN, containing a bonus cd with the acoustic versions of the songs.

== Track listing ==
1. "Boşver" (Don't care) – 4:26
2. "Elalem" (Everybody) – 4:18
3. "Karışmasın Kimseler" (Nobody should stand between us)- 5:23
4. "Çok Kısa" (So short) – 3:23
5. "Üç" (Three)– 3:57
6. "Rüzgar" (Wind) – 4:19
7. "Hayat Mars Etti" (Life won over) – 5:14
8. "Yüzümden Düşen Bin Parça" (A thousand pieces falling off my face) - 3:59
9. "Bir Anlık İstek" (Momentary need)– 4:16
10. "Yenilmişiz" (We're done) – 2:23
