= Kesmeşeker =

- Origin: Turkey
- Genres: Rock
- Years active: 1990–present
- Labels: Ada Müzik, Ece Müzik
- Members: Cenk Taner (vocals, guitar); Canay Cengen (electro guitar); Gökhan Özcan (drums); Demirhan Baylan (bass guitar)
- Past members: Belen Ünal (guitar); Tayfun Çağlar (vocals, bass); Melih Rona (drums); Serdar Öztop (guitar); Cem Güvener (drums); Can Alper (guitar); Batur Yurtsever (vocals, bass); Sezen Köroğlu (keyboard); Hüseyin Cebeci (drums); Kerem Akaydın (vocals); Tansu Kızılırmak (vocals, bass); Murat Başlamışlı (drums); Emre Sarıtunalılar (drums); Kaan Altan (guitar); Mehmet Şenol Şişli (bass); Timur Kurşunoğlu (drums)
- Website: kesmeseker.org

Kesmeşeker (meaning sugarcube) is a Turkish rock band, founded around 1990 by Cenk Taner (vocals, guitar), Belen Ünal (guitar), Tayfun Çağlar (vocals, bass), and Melih Rona (drums).

== History ==
The group was formed in Kadıköy/Istanbul, and over time, its musical style came to be known as the “Kadıköy sound.” After 20 years and eight recorded albums, only Cenk Taner of the founding members still continues to perform with the band. Taner comments on the band’s evolution as follows:

"We’ve had a lot of lineup changes too, but since the songwriter hasn’t changed, Kesmeşeker has been able to keep going. Because while guitar solos and drum fills are important, of course, Kesmeşeker’s listeners are more interested in the stories. (...) Different people bring their own unique touches, so naturally, Kesmeşeker reinvents itself with every album."

The band is one of the few remaining examples of Turkish rock bands that rose to prominence in the 1990s. Kesmeşeker was featured in the 2016 documentary "Sar Doksana" (Rewind the Nineties), which focuses on bands that made their mark on Turkish rock music in the 1990s.

Their most recent studio album is titled "Kadıköy", released at the end of 2017. Then, celebrating the groups' 30th anniversary in 2021, they released an EP titled "Ada".

Since the “Ada” and “Kadıköy” albums, Cenk Taner have been playing with Canay Cengen (electro guitar), Gökhan Özcan (drums) and Demirhan Baylan (bass guitar).

Before Baylan, bass guitarist Mehmet Şenol Şişli, who is one of the leading figures of Turkish rock music, had played with Kesmeşeker. He left Mavi Sakal in 2000, by 2006 he performed with Kesmeşeker. Then he re-joined Kargo in 2009. He has also published two poetry books named Şua and Bahar Artıkları and one music demo Köpekleri Saymazsan. He wrote all of the lyrics in the Kargo album, Yalnızlık Mevsimi, which is counted as a milestone in Turkish rock music. He wrote most of the lyrics of Kargo's songs.

== Albums ==
- 1991 Dipten ve Derinden
- 1993 Aşk ve Para
- 1995 Tut Beni Düşmeden
- 1998 İnsülin
- 1999 İçinde İçindekiler Vardır
- 2001 İzin Vermedi Yalnızlık (Cenk Taner)
- 2004 Kum
- 2011 Doğdum Ben Memlekette
- 2013 Yoldan Çıkmış Şarkılar (Cenk Taner)
- 2017 Kadıköy
