= Göksel =

Göksel is a Turkish unisex given name and surname. Notable people with the name include:

== Given name ==
- Göksel (singer) (born 1971), Turkish singer-songwriter
- Göksel Arsoy (1936–2026), Turkish actor, singer, and sportsman
- Göksel Gümüşdağ (born 1972), Turkish businessman
- Göksel Kalaycıoğlu (born 1936), Turkish politician
- Göksel Kortay (born 1939), Turkish actress

== Surname ==
- Hüsnü A. Göksel (1919–2002), Turkish physician
