= Vega (Turkish band) =

Turkish alternative rock band

- Origin: Turkey
- Genres: Rock
- Years active: 1996–present
- Labels: NR1 Müzik, Universal Music, Sony BMG, GRGDN
- Members: Deniz Özbey; Esat Tuğrul Akyüz
- Past members: Gökhan Mert Koral

Vega is a Turkish alternative rock band, founded by keyboardist Gökhan Mert Koral (also vocalist on some songs), vocalist Deniz Özbey, and guitarist Esat Tuğrul Akyüz in 1996. Gökhan Mert Koral left the group in early 2003. They played in many Turkish festivals like Rock'n Coke. Their biggest hits were "Bu Sabahların Bir Anlamı Olmalı", "Serzenişte", and "Elimde Değil".

For their first album Tamam Sustum, the group collaborated with Turgay Gülaydın from Athena and Burak Karataş from Kargo.

== Career ==
=== Foundation and first album ===
Vega was founded in 1996 by guitarist Tuğrul Akyüz, keyboardist Mert Koral and vocalist Deniz Özbey. Akyüz and Koral knew each other from their time at the ITU Electronic Engineering and were making music in English since 1992. Together with the Mimar Sinan University graduate, Deniz Özbey, they started to write their own songs, and the first piece, "Tamam Sustum", was noticed by NR1 Müzik's founder Murat Akad, who encouraged the group to keep working on new songs. Deniz Özbey and Tuğrul Akyüz have been married since 1999 and have a daughter together.

=== 2000s ===
The band started working on their new albums in 2000 and new recordings were made in 2001. In the summer of 2002, the group's second album, Tatlı Sert, was released. The album's production was taken from NR1, and given to Procekts, a music company founded by Teoman and connected to Universal Müzik, but he did not contribute much to this album due to his own projects. The group performed at their first concert for the album on 2 July 2002 at the H2000 festival. However, due to the financial hardships experienced by the company Universal, only 5000 copies of the album were prepared and not much promotion was done for it.

In 2005, the band started playing new songs at concerts and by the end of the year their third album, Hafif Müzik, was released by Sony BMG. The album's first music video was made for the song "Serzenişte", written by Deniz Özbey and Tuğrul Akyüz. Later, separate music videos were released for the song "Elimde Değil" and "Hafif Müzik". The release of the album was followed by a concert tour inside Turkey. The group also performed at the Rock'n Coke 2006. As the album's tour ended in 2008, Tuğrul and Deniz Akyüz's daughter, Ceylin, was born towards the end of the year.

=== 2010s ===
In 2015, Vega began new activities and started working for their new album. On 11 September 2017, the album's titled was announced as Delinin Yıldızı and it was released a week later. A concert tour in support of the album began on 30 September, which included 11 concerts.

== Discography ==
Tamam Sustum (OK I Shut Up) (NR1 Müzik, 1999)

1. (Tamam) Sustum! ((OK) I Shut Up!)
2. Alışamadım Yokluğuna (I Couldn't Get Used To Your Absence)
3. Anlatma (Don't Tell)
4. Vakit Varken (While We Still Have Time)
5. Oyun (Game)
6. Blöf (Bluff)
7. Tren (Train)
8. Dokunsana (Go Ahead and Touch)
9. Yalan (Lie)
10. Bir Gün Mutlaka (Definitely Someday)
11. Alışamadım Yokluğuna - Akustik

Tatlı Sert (Bittersweet) (Universal Music, June 2002)

1. Bu Sabahların Bir Anlamı Olmalı (There Must Be a Meaning of These Mornings)
2. Bihaber (Unaware)
3. Evet, Ne Var? (Yes, So What?)
4. İz Bırakanlar Unutulmaz (The Impressers Couldn't Be Forgetten)
5. Aşk Başlar (Love Begins)
6. Isınamazsın Ağlarken (You Can't Get Warm While You are Crying)
7. Zat-ı Ali (Himself)
8. Ninni (Lullaby)
9. Desem de İnanma (Don't Believe Even If I Say)
10. Çok Çektim (I Have Suffered a Lot)
11. Normal Mi Sence? (Does It Make Sense?)
12. Tadın Kaldı (I Can't Forget Your Taste)
13. Poh Poh Perisi (Flatter Fairy)

Anıl Çifter and Cenk Turanlı played bass guitar, Cengiz Baysal and Timur Kurşunoğlu played drums, İlgen Küçükseller played violin in this album. Singer Teoman was the producer of the album.

Hafif Müzik (Soft Music) (Sony BMG & GRGDN, 2005)

1. K9
2. Elimde Değil (I Can't Help It)
3. Serzenişte (In Reproof)
4. Mendil (Hankie)
5. Yalnızca Ben, Yüzlerce Sen (Only Me, Hundreds of You)
6. Uçları Kırık (Split Ends)
7. Yok (Absent)
8. Hafif Müzik (Light Music)
9. Yanıyor Zaman (The Time Is Burning)
10. O Şarkı (That Song)
11. Sokaklar Tekin Değil (The Streets Are Inauspicious)
12. Ankara

Delinin Yıldızı (Star of the Insane) (GRGDN, 2017)

1. Delinin Yıldızı
2. İsim - Şehir (Name - City)
3. Arzuhal
4. Sevgilim (My darling)
5. Dertler İri Kıyım (Concerns are grave)
6. Komşu Işıklar (Neighbouring lights)
7. Dünyacım (My little world)
8. Sonunu Söyleme Bana (Don't tell me its end)
9. Man-yak-lar (Maniacs)
10. ve Tekrar (and Again)
