= List of awards and nominations received by Juanes =

Juanes awards and nominations
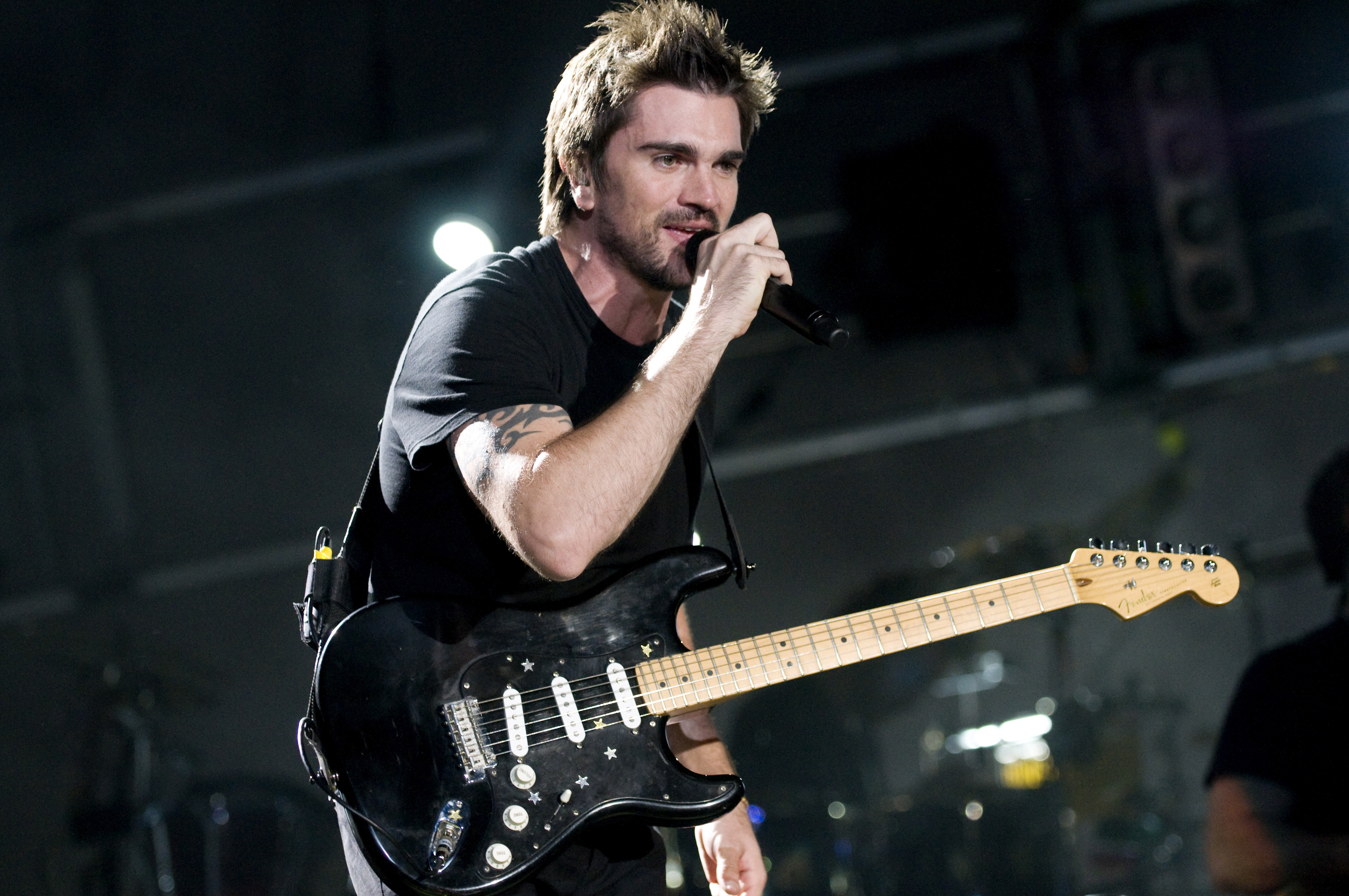
- Juanes in 2008
Awards and nominations
Award	Wins	Nominations
American Music Awards	0	1
Billboard Latin Music Awards	12	34
BMI Latin Awards	25	25
Grammy Awards	4	9
Latin Grammy Awards	26	0
Lo Nuestro Awards	14	44
MTV Europe Music Awards	0	1
Pollstar Awards	0	1
Premios Juventud	1	25
Premios Oye!	4	6
World Music Awards	0	4

Totals (Note: Certain award groups do not simply award one winner. They acknowledge several different recipients, have runners-up, and have third place. Since this is a specific recognition and is different from losing an award, runner-up mentions are considered wins in this award tally. For simplification and to avoid errors, each award in this list has been presumed to have had a prior nomination.)
- Wins: 160
- Nominations: 395

Juanes is a Colombian singer-songwriter winner of multiple accolades through his career. He is one of the all-time best-selling Latin musicians.

Upon the release of his debut album, Fíjate Bien in 2000, he won multiple nominations and awards in major ceremonies, including Grammy Awards, Latin Grammy Awards and BMI Latin Awards. Through a short-span of years, he became the most awarded artist in Latin Grammy Awards history, before being overtaken by Juan Luis Guerra. Juanes remains as the most awarded Colombian artist in the Grammy Awards history, as well as one of the most awarded in the Latin Grammy Awards. His career and success were recognized by some organizations, including BMI Latin Awards' Certificate of Achievement (2002) and President's Award (2010), in addition to be named Artist of the Decade (2000s) by Monitor Latino Awards and Shock Awards. Juanes was inducted into the Latin Songwriters Hall of Fame in 2022.

Outside of his work in music, Juanes has been recognized for his charitable support, including an inaugural Spirit of Change by MTV Latin American Awards, and the first Organization of American States' Trust for the Americas Humanitarian Award. Included among Time 100 list in 2005, Juanes was named Person of the Year by the Latin Recording Academy in 2019. In addition, he was named Person of the Year by various other publications, including El Tiempo (2006 and 2008) Cambio (2008), Elenco (2008), and El Espectador (2005 and 2009).

== Awards and nominations ==
Award/organization (Note: Charts are not included, unless they are explicitly described as "awards" or specific trophies are given.)	Year	Nominee/work	Category	Result	Ref.
ALMA Award	2002	Juanes	Breakthrough Artist/Group	Nominated	
ALMA Award	2002	Juanes (Noches De Carnaval, Univision)	Spanish-language Performance in a Television Special	Nominated	
American Music Awards	2008	Juanes	Favorite Latin Artist	Nominated	
Amigo Awards	2003	Juanes	Latin Artist Revelation	Won	
Amigo Awards	2003	Juanes	Latin Male Artist	Won	
Amigo Awards	2003	Un Día Normal	Latin Album of the Year	Won	
Atlantic Council	2013	Juanes	Distinguished Artistic Leadership Award	Honoree	
Bandamax Awards	2015	"Querida" (Juan Gabriel featuring Juanes)	Collaboration of the Year	Nominated	
Billboard Latin Music Awards	2003	Un Día Normal	Latin Pop Album of the Year, Male	Won	
Billboard Latin Music Awards	2003	Un Día Normal	Latin Rock Album of the Year	Nominated	
Billboard Latin Music Awards	2003	Juanes	Hot Latin Tracks Artist of the Year	Nominated	
Billboard Latin Music Awards	2003	Juanes	Songwriter of the Year	Nominated	
Billboard Latin Music Awards	2003	Juanes	Top Latin Albums Artist of the Year	Nominated	
Billboard Latin Music Awards	2003	"A Dios le Pido"	Latin Pop Airplay Track of the Year, Male	Nominated	
Billboard Latin Music Awards	2004	"Fotografía" (featuring Nelly Furtado)	Latin Pop Airplay Track of the Year/Duo	Won	
Billboard Latin Music Awards	2004	"Fotografía" (featuring Nelly Furtado)	Hot Latin Track of the Year/Vocal Duo	Won	
Billboard Latin Music Awards	2004	"Fotografía" (featuring Nelly Furtado)	Hot Latin Track of the Year	Nominated	
Billboard Latin Music Awards	2004	Juanes	Hot Latin Tracks Artist of the Year	Nominated	
Billboard Latin Music Awards	2004	Juanes	Songwriter of the Year	Won	
Billboard Latin Music Awards	2005	Juanes	Hot Latin Tracks Artist of the Year	Nominated	
Billboard Latin Music Awards	2005	Juanes	Top Latin Albums Artist of the Year	Nominated	
Billboard Latin Music Awards	2005	"Nada Valgo Sin Tu Amor"	Hot Latin Track of the Year	Won	
Billboard Latin Music Awards	2005	"Nada Valgo Sin Tu Amor"	Latin Pop Airplay Track of the Year, Male	Won	
Billboard Latin Music Awards	2005	Mi Sangre	Latin Pop Album of the Year, Male	Won	
Billboard Latin Music Awards	2006	Juanes	Hot Latin Songs Artist of the Year	Won	
Billboard Latin Music Awards	2006	Juanes	Songwriter of the Year	Won	
Billboard Latin Music Awards	2006	Juanes	Top Latin Albums Artist of the Year	Nominated	
Billboard Latin Music Awards	2006	"La Camisa Negra"	Hot Latin Song of the Year	Nominated	
Billboard Latin Music Awards	2006	"La Camisa Negra"	Latin Pop Airplay Song of the Year, Male	Won	
Billboard Latin Music Awards	2007	"Lo Que Me Gusta a Mí"	Latin Pop Airplay Song of the Year	Nominated	
Billboard Latin Music Awards	2008	"Me Enamora"	Hot Latin Song of the Year	Nominated	
Billboard Latin Music Awards	2008	"Me Enamora"	Latin Pop Airplay Song of the Year	Nominated	
Billboard Latin Music Awards	2008	"Me Enamora"	Latin Ringmaster of the Year	Nominated	
Billboard Latin Music Awards	2008	La Vida... Es Un Ratico	Latin Pop Album of the Year, Male	Won	
Billboard Latin Music Awards	2008	Juanes	Spirit of Hope	Honoree	
Billboard Latin Music Awards	2009	Juanes	Hot Latin Songs Artist of the Year	Nominated	
Billboard Latin Music Awards	2009	"Gotas de Agua Dulce"	Latin Pop Airplay Song of the Year, Male	Nominated	
Billboard Latin Music Awards	2015	Juanes	Latin Pop Songs Artist of the Year, Solo	Nominated	
Billboard Latin Music Awards	2016	Juanes	Latin Pop Songs Artist of the Year, Solo	Nominated	
Billboard Latin Music Awards	2016	"Juntos (Together)"	Latin Pop Song of the Year	Nominated	
Billboard Latin Music Awards	2018	Juanes	Latin Pop Artist of the Year, Solo	Nominated	
Billboard Latin Music Awards	2018	Mis planes son amarte	Latin Pop Album of the Year	Nominated	
BMI Latin Awards	2002	Juanes	Winning Songwriters	Won	
BMI Latin Awards	2002	Juanes	Certificate of Achievement	Honoree	
BMI Latin Awards	2002	"Fíjate Bien"	Award-Winning Songs	Won	
BMI Latin Awards	2003	"Nada"	Award-Winning Songs	Won	
BMI Latin Awards	2004	"A Dios le Pido"	Award-Winning Songs	Won	
BMI Latin Awards	2004	"Es Por Ti"	Award-Winning Songs	Won	
BMI Latin Awards	2004	"Mala Gente"	Award-Winning Songs	Won	
BMI Latin Awards	2005	"La Paga"	Award-Winning Songs	Won	
BMI Latin Awards	2005	"Fotografía" (featuring Nelly Furtado)	Award-Winning Songs	Won	
BMI Latin Awards	2005	"Fotografía" (featuring Nelly Furtado)	Song of the Year	Won	
BMI Latin Awards	2005	Juanes	Winning Songwriters	Won	
BMI Latin Awards	2006	"La Camisa Negra"	Award-Winning Songs	Won	
BMI Latin Awards	2006	"Nada Valgo Sin Tu Amor"	Award-Winning Songs	Won	
BMI Latin Awards	2006	"Volverte a Ver"	Award-Winning Songs	Won	
BMI Latin Awards	2007	"Lo Que Me Gusta a Mí"	Award-Winning Songs	Won	
BMI Latin Awards	2009	"Gotas de Agua Dulce"	Award-Winning Songs	Won	
BMI Latin Awards	2009	"Me Enamora"	Award-Winning Songs	Won	
BMI Latin Awards	2010	"Odio por Amor"	Award-Winning Songs	Won	
BMI Latin Awards	2010	"Tres"	Award-Winning Songs	Won	
BMI Latin Awards	2010	Juanes	BMI President's Award	Honoree	
BMI Latin Awards	2012	"Y No Regresas"	Award-Winning Songs	Won	
BMI Latin Awards	2012	"Yerbatero"	Award-Winning Songs	Won	
BMI Latin Awards	2015	"La Luz"	Award-Winning Songs	Won	
BMI Latin Awards	2016	"Una Flor"	Award-Winning Songs	Won	
BMI Latin Awards	2017	"Juntos (Together)"	Award-Winning Songs	Won	
Cadena Dial	2008	Juanes	Dial 2007 Award	Won	
Cadena Dial	2011	Juanes	Dial 2010 Award	Won	
Cadena Dial	2018	Juanes	Dial 2018 Award	Won	
Casandra Awards		Juanes	Gran Soberano	Honoree	
CILSA ONG	2017	Juanes	International Social Commitment 2017	Honoree	
Fan Choice Awards (Mexico) (Note: A Mexican fan-voted award.)	2018	Juanes	Pop Artist of the Year	Nominated	
Fan Choice Awards (Mexico)	2020	Juanes	Pop Artist of the Year	Nominated	
Fan Choice Awards (Mexico)	2021	Juanes	Best Symphonic	Nominated	
Fan Choice Awards (Mexico)	2021	Juanes	Best Streaming Concert	Nominated	
Fan Choice Awards (Mexico)	2021	Juanes	Best Male Singer / Video Feat.	Nominated	
Galardón a los Grandes (Mexico) (Note: An award given by Raul Velasco in Siempre en Domingo.)	2011	Juanes	Pop Male Artist of the Year	Nominated	
Grammy Awards	2002	Fíjate Bien	Best Latin Rock or Alternative Album	Nominated	
Grammy Awards	2003	Un Día Normal	Best Latin Rock or Alternative Album	Nominated	
Grammy Awards	2005	Mi Sangre	Best Latin Rock or Alternative Album	Nominated	
Grammy Awards	2009	La Vida... Es Un Ratico	Best Latin Pop Album	Won	
Grammy Awards	2013	MTV Unplugged	Best Latin Pop Album	Won	
Grammy Awards	2015	Loco de Amor	Best Latin Pop Album	Nominated	
Grammy Awards	2018	Mis planes son amarte	Best Latin Pop Album	Nominated	
Grammy Awards	2022	Origen	Best Latin Rock or Alternative Album	Won	
Grammy Awards	2024	Vida Cotidiana	Best Latin Rock or Alternative Album	Won	
Heat Latin Music Awards	2015	Juanes	Gold Award	Gold	
Heat Latin Music Awards	2015	Juanes	Best Male Artist	Nominated	
Heat Latin Music Awards	2015	Juanes	Best Rock Male Artist	Nominated	
Heat Latin Music Awards	2015	"Loco de amor"	Best Music Video	Nominated	
Heat Latin Music Awards	2016	Juanes	Best Pop/Rock Artist	Nominated	
Heat Latin Music Awards	2017	Juanes	Best Rock Artist	Won	
Heat Latin Music Awards	2019	Juanes	Best Rock Artist	Won	
Heat Latin Music Awards	2019	Juanes	Compromiso Award	Honoree	
Heat Latin Music Awards	2019	"Pa Dentro"	Best Video	Nominated	
Heat Latin Music Awards	2020	Juanes	Best Rock Artist	Won	
Heat Latin Music Awards	2021	Juanes	Best Rock Artist	Nominated	
Heat Latin Music Awards	2022	Juanes	Best Rock Artist	Nominated	
Heat Latin Music Awards	2023	Juanes	Best Rock Artist	Nominated	
Heat Latin Music Awards	2024	Juanes	Best Rock Artist	Nominated	
Latin American Music Awards	2017	Juanes	Favorite Male Artist—Pop/Rock	Nominated	
Latin American Music Awards	2018	Mis planes son amarte	Favorite Pop Album	Nominated	
Latin American Music Awards	2018	"Pa Dentro"	Favorite Video	Nominated	
Latin American Music Awards	2021	#LaGiraSeQuedaEnCasa (with Alejandro Sanz)	Favorite Virtual Concert	Nominated	
Latin American Music Awards	2021	#VolverteAVer (with Orquesta Filarmónica de Bogota)	Favorite Virtual Concert	Nominated	
Latin Grammy Awards	2001	Juanes	Best New Artist	Won	
Latin Grammy Awards	2001	"Fíjate Bien"	Best Rock Song	Won	
Latin Grammy Awards	2001	"Fíjate Bien"	Best Music Video	Nominated	
Latin Grammy Awards	2001	"Fíjate Bien"	Song of the Year	Nominated	
Latin Grammy Awards	2001	"Fíjate Bien"	Record of the Year	Nominated	
Latin Grammy Awards	2001	Fíjate Bien	Best Rock Solo Vocal Album	Won	
Latin Grammy Awards	2001	Fíjate Bien	Album of the Year	Nominated	
Latin Grammy Awards	2002	"A Dios le Pido"	Best Rock Song	Won	
Latin Grammy Awards	2002	"A Dios le Pido"	Best Music Video	Nominated	
Latin Grammy Awards	2002	"A Dios le Pido"	Song of the Year	Nominated	
Latin Grammy Awards	2003	Un Día Normal	Album of the Year	Won	
Latin Grammy Awards	2003	Un Día Normal	Best Rock Solo Vocal Album	Won	
Latin Grammy Awards	2003	"Es Por Ti"	Record of the Year	Won	
Latin Grammy Awards	2003	"Es Por Ti"	Song of the Year	Won	
Latin Grammy Awards	2003	"Mala Gente"	Best Rock Song	Won	
Latin Grammy Awards	2005	"Volverte a Ver"	Best Music Video	Won	
Latin Grammy Awards	2005	"Nada Valgo Sin Tu Amor"	Best Rock Song	Won	
Latin Grammy Awards	2005	Mi Sangre	Best Rock Solo Vocal Album	Won	
Latin Grammy Awards	2008	"Me Enamora"	Song of the Year	Won	
Latin Grammy Awards	2008	"Me Enamora"	Record of the Year	Won	
Latin Grammy Awards	2008	"Me Enamora"	Best Short Form Music Video	Won	
Latin Grammy Awards	2008	La Vida... Es Un Ratico	Best Male Pop Vocal Album	Won	
Latin Grammy Awards	2008	La Vida... Es Un Ratico	Album of the Year	Won	
Latin Grammy Awards	2009	Pombo Musical (Various Artists)	Best Latin Children's Album	Won	
Latin Grammy Awards	2012	MTV Unplugged	Album of the Year	Won	
Latin Grammy Awards	2012	MTV Unplugged	Best Long Form Music Video	Won	
Latin Grammy Awards	2012	"Azul Sabina" (featuring Joaquín Sabina)	Song of the Year	Nominated	
Latin Grammy Awards	2012	"Azul Sabina" (featuring Joaquín Sabina)	Record of the Year	Nominated	
Latin Grammy Awards	2014	Loco de Amor	Best Pop/Rock Album	Won	
Latin Grammy Awards	2014	"Mil Pedazos"	Best Rock Song	Nominated	
Latin Grammy Awards	2015	Loco de Amor: La Historia	Best Long Form Music Video	Won	
Latin Grammy Awards	2017	Mis planes son amarte	Best Pop/Rock Album	Won	
Latin Grammy Awards	2017	Mis planes son amarte	Album of the Year	Nominated	
Latin Grammy Awards	2017	Mis planes son amarte	Best Long Form Music Video	Nominated	
Latin Grammy Awards	2017	"El Ratico" (with Kali Uchis)	Record of the Year	Nominated	
Latin Grammy Awards	2017	"Amárrame" (Mon Laferte featuring Juanes)	Record of the Year	Nominated	
Latin Grammy Awards	2018	"Pa Dentro"	Best Short Form Music Video	Won	
Latin Grammy Awards	2019	"Querer Mejor"	Song of the Year	Nominated	
Latin Grammy Awards	2019	"Querer Mejor"	Record of the Year	Nominated	
Latin Grammy Awards	2019	"La Plata"	Record of the Year	Nominated	
Latin Grammy Awards	2020	"Bonita" (with Sebastián Yatra)	Best Pop Song	Nominated	
Latin Grammy Awards	2020	"Bonita" (with Sebastián Yatra)	Song of the Year	Nominated	
Latin Grammy Awards	2020	Más futuro que pasado	Best Pop Vocal Album	Nominated	
Latin Grammy Awards	2021	Origen	Album of the Year	Nominated	
Latin Grammy Awards	2021	Origen	Best Pop/Rock Album	Won	
Latin Grammy Awards	2021	Origen (Documentary)	Best Long Form Music Video	Nominated	
Latin Grammy Awards	2023	Vida Cotidiana	Album of the Year	Nominated	
Latin Grammy Awards	2023	Vida Cotidiana	Best Pop/Rock Album	Won	
Latin Grammy Awards	2023	"Si Tú Me Quieres"	Record of the Year	Nominated	
Latin Grammy Awards	2023	"Gris"	Best Rock Song	Nominated	
Latin Recording Academy	2019	Juanes	Person of the Year	Honoree	
Latino Show Music Awards (Colombia)	2021	Juanes	Best Pop Male Artist	Won	
Latino Show Music Awards (Colombia)	2022	Juanes	Alternative/Rock/Indie Artist or Group	Won	
Latino Show Music Awards (Colombia)	2022	"El amor después del amor"	Alternative/Rock/Indie Song	Won	
Latino Show Music Awards (Colombia)	2023	Juanes	Alternative/Rock/Indie Artist or Group	Won	
Latino Show Music Awards (Colombia)	2023	Juanes (with Sebastián Krys and Emmanuel Briceño)	Alternative/Rock/Indie Producer	Won	
Latino Show Music Awards (Colombia)	2023	"Amores prohibidos"	Alternative/Rock/Indie Song	Won	
Latin Songwriters Hall of Fame	2016	Juanes	Hall of Fame Inductee	Nominated	
Latin Songwriters Hall of Fame	2022	Juanes	Hall of Fame Inductee	Inductee	
Los 40 Music Awards	2007	Juanes	Best Latin Act	Won	
Los 40 Music Awards	2007	"Me Enamora"	Best Latin Song	Won	
Los 40 Music Awards	2008	Juanes	Best Latin Act	Won	
Los 40 Music Awards	2008	"Gotas de Agua Dulce"	Best Latin Song	Won	
Los 40 Music Awards	2010	Juanes	Best Latin Act	Nominated	
Los 40 Music Awards	2010	"Gotas de Agua Dulce"	Best Latin Song	Nominated	
Los 40 Music Awards	2012	Juanes	Best Latin Act	Nominated	
Los 40 Music Awards	2016	Juanes	Best Latin Act	Nominated	
Los 40 Music Awards	2016	Juanes	50th Anniversary Golden Music Awards	Honoree	
Los 40 Music Awards	2016	"Tu enemigo" (Pablo López featuring Juanes)	Song of the Year	Won	
Los 40 Music Awards	2017	Juanes	Best Latin Act	Nominated	
Los 40 Music Awards	2022	Juanes	Golden Music Award	Honoree	
Los 40 Principales Ballantine Awards	2012	Juanes	Best Artist or Group in Spanish	Nominated	
Los 40 América Veracruz Awards	2012	MTV Unplugged	Best Album	Nominated	
Los 40 América Veracruz Awards	2014	Juanes	Best Artist or Group in Spanish	Won	
Lo Nuestro Awards	2003	Juanes	Pop Male Artist	Won	
Lo Nuestro Awards	2003	Juanes	Rock/Alternative Artist	Won	
Lo Nuestro Awards	2003	Un Día Normal	Rock Album of the Year	Nominated	
Lo Nuestro Awards	2003	"A Dios le Pido"	Pop Song of the Year	Won	
Lo Nuestro Awards	2003	"A Dios le Pido"	Video of the Year	Won	
Lo Nuestro Awards	2004	Juanes	Pop Male Artist	Won	
Lo Nuestro Awards	2004	Juanes and Nelly Furtado	Pop Duo or Group	Nominated	
Lo Nuestro Awards	2004	"Fotografía" (featuring Nelly Furtado)	Video of the Year	Won	
Lo Nuestro Awards	2005	Juanes	Rock Artist of the Year	Won	
Lo Nuestro Awards	2006	Juanes	Rock Artist of the Year	Won	
Lo Nuestro Awards	2006	"Nada Valgo Sin Tu Amor"	Rock Song of the Year	Won	
Lo Nuestro Awards	2006	"La Camisa Negra"	Pop Song of the Year	Nominated	
Lo Nuestro Awards	2006	"Volverte a Ver"	Pop Song of the Year	Nominated	
Lo Nuestro Awards	2007	Juanes	Rock Artist of the Year	Nominated	
Lo Nuestro Awards	2007	"Lo Que Me Gusta a Mí"	Rock Song of the Year	Nominated	
Lo Nuestro Awards	2008	"Me Enamora"	Video of the Year	Nominated	
Lo Nuestro Awards	2009	Juanes	Rock Artist of the Year	Won	
Lo Nuestro Awards	2009	La Vida... Es Un Ratico	Rock Album of the Year	Won	
Lo Nuestro Awards	2009	"Me Enamora"	Rock Song of the Year	Won	
Lo Nuestro Awards	2009	"Gotas de Agua Dulce"	Rock Song of the Year	Nominated	
Lo Nuestro Awards	2009	"Tres"	Rock Song of the Year	Nominated	
Lo Nuestro Awards	2010	Juanes	Rock Artist of the Year	Nominated	
Lo Nuestro Awards	2011	Juanes	Artist of the Year	Nominated	
Lo Nuestro Awards	2011	Juanes	Rock Artist of the Year	Won	
Lo Nuestro Awards	2011	"Yerbatero"	Rock Song of the Year	Won	
Lo Nuestro Awards	2012	P.A.R.C.E.	Rock Album of the Year	Nominated	
Lo Nuestro Awards	2012	"Y No Regresas"	Rock Song of the Year	Nominated	
Lo Nuestro Awards	2012	Juanes	Rock Artist of the Year	Nominated	
Lo Nuestro Awards	2013	MTV Unplugged	Rock Album of the Year	Nominated	
Lo Nuestro Awards	2013	Juanes	Rock/Alternative Artist of the Year	Nominated	
Lo Nuestro Awards	2013	"La Señal"	Rock/Alternative Song	Nominated	
Lo Nuestro Awards	2013	"Me Enamora" (MTV Unplugged version)	Rock/Alternative Song	Nominated	
Lo Nuestro Awards	2015	Loco de Amor	Pop Album of the Year	Nominated	
Lo Nuestro Awards	2015	Juanes	Pop Male Artist	Nominated	
Lo Nuestro Awards	2016	"Juntos (Together)"	Pop Song of the Year	Nominated	
Lo Nuestro Awards	2017	"Tu enemigo" (Pablo López featuring Juanes)	Video of the Year	Nominated	
Lo Nuestro Awards	2019	Juanes	Pop/Rock Artist of the Year	Nominated	
Lo Nuestro Awards	2020	Juanes	Pop/Rock Artist of the Year	Nominated	
Lo Nuestro Awards	2021	"Bonita" (Juanes feauting Sebastián Yatra)	Pop Collaboration of the Year	Nominated	
Lo Nuestro Awards	2021	"Bonita" (Juanes feauting Sebastián Yatra)	Pop Song of the Year	Nominated	
Lo Nuestro Awards	2021	"Bonita" (Juanes feauting Sebastián Yatra)	Song of the Year	Nominated	
Lo Nuestro Awards	2021	Más futuro que pasado	Album of the Year	Nominated	
Lo Nuestro Awards	2021	Más futuro que pasado	Pop Album of the Year	Nominated	
Lo Nuestro Awards	2021	Juanes	Pop Artist of the Year	Nominated	
Lo Nuestro Awards	2024	"Las Mujeres" (with Carlos Vives)	Tropical Collaboration of the Year	Nominated	
Lunas del Auditorio	2006	Juanes	Pop Artist — Spanish-language	Nominated	
Lunas del Auditorio	2009	Juanes	Pop Artist — Spanish-language	Nominated	
Lunas del Auditorio	2015	Juanes	Pop Artist — Spanish-language	Nominated	
Mi TRL Awards	2007	Juanes	Male of the Year	Won	
Monitor Latino Awards	2010	Juanes	Artist of the Decade	Honoree	
Monitor Latino Awards	2010	Juanes	Popular Vote	Nominated	
Monitor Latino Awards	2010	Juanes	Most Acclaimed Artist of Entertainment	Nominated	
Monitor Latino Awards	2020	Juanes	Pop Artist of the Year	Nominated	
Monitor Latino Awards	2020	"Bonita" (Juanes feauting Sebastián Yatra)	Pop Song of the Year	Nominated	
MTV Europe Music Awards	2012	Juanes	Best Latin America Central Act	Nominated	
MTV Latin America Awards	2002	Juanes	Artist of the Year	Nominated	
MTV Latin America Awards	2002	Juanes	Best Solo Artist	Won	
MTV Latin America Awards	2002	Juanes	Best Rock Artist	Nominated	
MTV Latin America Awards	2002	Juanes	Best Artist — North	Nominated	
MTV Latin America Awards	2002	"A Dios le Pido"	Video of the Year	Nominated	
MTV Latin America Awards	2003	Juanes	Artist of the Year	Won	
MTV Latin America Awards	2003	Juanes	Best Solo Artist	Nominated	
MTV Latin America Awards	2003	Juanes	Best Rock Artist	Won	
MTV Latin America Awards	2003	Juanes	Best Artist — Central	Nominated	
MTV Latin America Awards	2003	"Fotografía" (featuring Nelly Furtado)	Video of the Year	Nominated	
MTV Latin America Awards	2005	Juanes	Artist of the Year	Nominated	
MTV Latin America Awards	2005	Juanes	Best Male Artist	Won	
MTV Latin America Awards	2005	Juanes	Best Rock Artist	Won	
MTV Latin America Awards	2005	Juanes	Best Artist — Central	Nominated	
MTV Latin America Awards	2005	"La Camisa Negra"	Video of the Year	Nominated	
MTV Latin America Awards	2006	Juanes	Best Artist — Central	Won	
MTV Latin America Awards	2007	Juanes	Agent of Change	Honoree	
MTV Latin America Awards	2007	Juanes	Fashionista — Male	Nominated	
MTV Latin America Awards	2008	Juanes	Artist of the Year	Won	
MTV Latin America Awards	2008	Juanes	Best Solo Artist	Won	
MTV Latin America Awards	2008	Juanes	Best Rock Artist	Won	
MTV Latin America Awards	2008	Juanes	Best Artist — Central	Won	
National Peace Prize	2009	Juanes	Honorific National Peace Prize	Honoree	
Nickelodeon Colombia Kids' Choice Awards	2014	Juanes	Favorite Colombian Artist or Group	Nominated	
Nickelodeon Colombia Kids' Choice Awards	2014	"La Luz"	Favorite Latin Song	Nominated	
Nickelodeon Colombia Kids' Choice Awards	2015	Juanes	Favorite Local Artist or Group	Nominated	
Nickelodeon Colombia Kids' Choice Awards	2015	Juanes	Pro Golden Award	Honoree	
Nickelodeon Colombia Kids' Choice Awards	2015	"Juntos (Together)"	Favorite Local Song	Nominated	
Nickelodeon Mexico Kids' Choice Awards (Note: Originally known as "Mis Premios Nick Mexico")	2012	Juanes	Favorite Solo Latin Artist	Nominated	
Organization of American States	2008	Juanes	Trust for the Americas Humanitarian Award	Honoree	
Orgullosamente Latino Award	2008	Juanes	Solo Male Artist	Nominated	
Orgullosamente Latino Award	2008	La Vida... Es Un Ratico	Latin Album of the Year	Nominated	
Pantalla de Cristal Film Festival	2002	"A Dios le Pido"	Best Video	Won	
PeaceTech Lab	2021	Juanes	International Peace Honors Award	Honoree	
People en Español Awards	2010	Juanes	Comeback of the Year	Nominated	
People en Español Awards	2012	Tr3s Presents Juanes MTV Unplugged	Album of the Year	Won	
People en Español Awards	2012	Juanes	Comeback of the Year	2nd place	
People en Español Awards	2012	Juanes	King of Facebook	Nominated	
People en Español Awards	2012	Juanes	Photo of the Year	Nominated	
Pollstar Awards	2018	Juanes	Latin Tour of the Year	Nominated	
Premios Juventud	2004	Juanes and Nelly Furtado	Dynamic Duet	Won	
Premios Juventud	2004	"A Dios le Pido"	Catchiest Tune	Nominated	
Premios Juventud	2004	Un Día Normal	CD To Die For	Nominated	
Premios Juventud	2005	Juanes	Favorite Pop Artist	Nominated	
Premios Juventud	2005	Juanes	I Hear Him Everywhere	Nominated	
Premios Juventud	2005	Juanes	My Favorite Concert	Nominated	
Premios Juventud	2005	"La Camisa Negra"	Catchiest Tune	Nominated	
Premios Juventud	2005	Mi Sangre	CD To Die For	Nominated	
Premios Juventud	2006	Juanes	Favorite Rock Star	Nominated	
Premios Juventud	2006	Juanes	My Favorite Concert	Nominated	
Premios Juventud	2007	Juanes	Favorite Rock Star	Nominated	
Premios Juventud	2008	Juanes	Favorite Rock Star	Nominated	
Premios Juventud	2008	Juanes	My Idol is...	Nominated	
Premios Juventud	2008	La Vida... Es Un Ratico	CD to Die For	Nominated	
Premios Juventud	2008	La Vida Tour	My Favorite Concert	Nominated	
Premios Juventud	2008	"Me Enamora"	My Favorite Video	Nominated	
Premios Juventud	2009	Juanes	Favorite Rock Star	Nominated	
Premios Juventud	2010	Juanes	Favorite Rock Star	Nominated	
Premios Juventud	2011	Juanes	Favorite Rock Star	Nominated	
Premios Juventud	2012	Juanes	Favorite Rock Star	Nominated	
Premios Juventud	2013	Juanes	Favorite Rock Star	Nominated	
Premios Juventud	2019	"La Plata"" (featuring Lalo Ebratt)	This Is a BTS (Best Behind the Scenes)	Nominated	
Premios Juventud	2020	#LaGiraSeQuedaEnCasa (with Alejandro Sanz)	#Stay Home Concert	Nominated	
Premios Juventud	2024	"Las Mujeres" (with Carlos Vives)	Best Tropical Mix	Nominated	
Premios Juventud	2024	"Las Mujeres" (with Carlos Vives)	The Perfect Mix	Nominated	
Premios Nuestra Tierra	2008	Juanes	Artist of the Year	Nominated	
Premios Nuestra Tierra	2008	Juanes	Pop Artist of the Year	Won	
Premios Nuestra Tierra	2008	Juanes	Favorite Artist (Public)	Won	
Premios Nuestra Tierra	2008	Juanes	Best Colombian Artist Website	Won	
Premios Nuestra Tierra	2008	Juanes and Toby Tobón	Best Producer	Won	
Premios Nuestra Tierra	2008	"Me Enamora"	Song of the Year	Nominated	
Premios Nuestra Tierra	2008	"Me Enamora"	Favorite Song (Public)	Won	
Premios Nuestra Tierra	2008	"Me Enamora"	Best Pop Song of the Year	Won	
Premios Nuestra Tierra	2008	"Me Enamora"	Best Video of the Year	Won	
Premios Nuestra Tierra	2009	Juanes	Pop Solo Artist or Group	Nominated	
Premios Nuestra Tierra	2009	Juanes	Singer of the Year (Public)	Nominated	
Premios Nuestra Tierra	2009	Juanes	Best Colombian Artist Website	Nominated	
Premios Nuestra Tierra	2009	Juanes	Best Pop Singer	Nominated	
Premios Nuestra Tierra	2009	"Odio por Amor"	Best Song of the Year	Nominated	
Premios Nuestra Tierra	2009	"Odio por Amor"	Best Song (Public)	Nominated	
Premios Nuestra Tierra	2009	La Vida... Es Un Ratico	Best Album of the Year	Won	
Premios Nuestra Tierra	2009	Pombo Musical (Various Artists)	Best Album of the Year	Nominated	
Premios Nuestra Tierra	2010	Juanes	Best Colombian Artist Website	Nominated	
Premios Nuestra Tierra	2011	Juanes	Pop Solo Artist or Group	Nominated	
Premios Nuestra Tierra	2011	Juanes	Singer of the Year (Public)	Nominated	
Premios Nuestra Tierra	2011	Juanes	Twitterer of the Year	Nominated	
Premios Nuestra Tierra	2011	Juanes	Best Colombian Artist Website	Nominated	
Premios Nuestra Tierra	2011	P.A.R.C.E.	Album of the Year	Nominated	
Premios Nuestra Tierra	2011	"Yerbatero"	Best Video — Colombian	Nominated	
Premios Nuestra Tierra	2012	Juanes	Twitterer of the Year	Nominated	
Premios Nuestra Tierra	2012	La Vida... Es Un Ratico (El Paseo)	Best National Soundtrack	Won	
Premios Nuestra Tierra	2013	Juanes	Best Artist (Public)	Nominated	
Premios Nuestra Tierra	2013	MTV Unplugged	Album of the Year	Nominated	
Premios Nuestra Tierra	2013	El Paseo 2	Best National Soundtrack	Won	
Premios Nuestra Tierra	2020	Juanes	Pop Artist of the Year	Nominated	
Premios Nuestra Tierra	2020	Más futuro que pasado	Album of the Year	Nominated	
Premios Nuestra Tierra	2020	"Querer Mejor" (featuring Alessia Cara)	Pop Song of the Year	Nominated	
Premios Nuestra Tierra	2020	"La Plata" (with Lalo Ebratt)	Video of the Year	Nominated	
Premios Nuestra Tierra	2021	Juanes	Artista Imagen de Nuestra Tierra en el Mundo	Nominated	
Premios Nuestra Tierra	2021	Serenata por las Madres (with Fonseca)	Best Concert	Nominated	
Premios Nuestra Tierra	2022	Juanes	Alternative Rock/Indie Artist	Won	
Premios Nuestra Tierra	2022	Origen	Album of the Year	Nominated	
Premios Nuestra Tierra	2023	Juanes	Artist of the Year	Nominated	
Premios Nuestra Tierra	2023	Juanes	Alternative Rock/Indie Artist	Won	
Premios Nuestra Tierra	2023	Juanes	Artista Imagen de Nuestra Tierra en el Mundo	Nominated	
Premios Nuestra Tierra	2023	"506" (with Morat)	Pop Song of the Year	Nominated	
Premios Nuestra Tierra	2023	"Amores prohibidos"	Alternative Rock/Indie Song	Nominated	
Premios Nuestra Tierra	2023	Origen Tour	Best Concert of the Year	Nominated	
Premios Nuestra Tierra	2023	Juanes and Morat	Best Concert of the Year	Nominated	
Premios Nuestra Tierra	2024	"Cecilia" (with Juan Luis Guerra)	Song of the Year	Nominated	
Premios Nuestra Tierra	2024	Vida Cotidiana	Album of the Year	Nominated	
Premios Nuestra Tierra	2024	"Las Mujeres" (with Carlos Vives)	Vallenato Song of the Year	Nominated	
Premios Nuestra Tierra	2024	"Gris"	Alternative Rock/Indie Song of the Year	Nominated	
Premios Nuestra Tierra	2024	Juanes	Best Concert of the Year	Nominated	
Premios Ondas	2002	Juanes	Latin Revelation Artist	Won	
Premios Ondas	2004	Juanes	Best Latin Artist or Group	Won	
Premios Ondas	2016	Juanes	Special Award from Jury	Honoree	
Premios Oye!	2002	"A Dios le Pido"	Song of the Year	Won	
Premios Oye!	2005	"La Camisa Negra"	Song of the Year	Won	
Premios Oye!	2008	Juanes	Male Singer of the Year	Won	
Premios Oye!	2008	"Me Enamora"	Song of the Year	Won	
Premios Oye!	2008	"Me Enamora"	Video of the Year	Nominated	
Premios Oye!	2008	La Vida... Es Un Ratico	Album of the Year	Nominated	
Quiero Awards (Argentina)	2010	"Yerbatero"	Video of the Year	Won	
Quiero Awards (Argentina)	2014	"La Luz"	Video of the Year	Nominated	
Quiero Awards (Argentina)	2014	"La Luz"	Best Male Video	Nominated	
Quiero Awards (Argentina)	2015	"Juntos (Together)"	Best Male Video	Nominated	
Quiero Awards (Argentina)	2015	Un poco Perdido	Outstanding Show	Nominated	
Quiero Awards (Argentina)	2016	Aquí Juanes	Best YouTube Channel	Nominated	
Quiero Awards (Argentina)	2017	"Fuego"	Best Male Video	Nominated	
Quiero Awards (Argentina)	2017	"El Ratico" (with Kali Uchis)	Outstanding Collaboration	Nominated	
Ritmo Latino Awards (Note: Also known as "Premio de la Gente" or Latin Music Fan Awards.)	2002	Juanes	Rock Solo Artist or Group, Spanish	Nominated	
Ritmo Latino Awards	2005	Juanes	Artist of the Year	Nominated	
Ritmo Latino Awards	2005	Juanes	Popular Music Solo/Group Artist	Nominated	
Ritmo Latino Awards	2005	Juanes	Solo Artist or Group of the Year	Nominated	
Ritmo Latino Awards	2005	Juanes	Songwriter of the Year	Nominated	
Ritmo Latino Awards	2005	"La Camisa Negra"	Song of the Year	Nominated	
Ritmo Latino Awards	2005	Mi Sangre	Album of the Year	Nominated	
Rolling Stone en Español Awards	2023	Juanes	Artist of the Year	Nominated	
Rolling Stone en Español Awards	2023	"Canción desaparecida" (with Mabiland)	Video of the Year	Nominated	
Rolling Stone en Español Awards	2023	"Solo por ser Indios" (with A.N.I.M.A.L.)	Video of the Year	Won	
Rolling Stone en Español Awards	2023	Vida Cotidiana	Album of the Year	Nominated	
SHOCK Awards (Colombia)	2004	"Nada Valgo Sin Tu Amor"	Best Song of the Year	Nominated	
SHOCK Awards (Colombia)	2010	"Yerbatero"	Best Radio Song	Nominated	
SHOCK Awards (Colombia)	2011	Juanes	Artist of the Decade	Honoree	
Telehit Awards	2010	Juanes	Latin Artist of the Year	Won	
Telehit Awards	2010	Juanes	Performer of the Year	Nominated	
Video Prisma Awards (Argentina)	2023	"Solo por ser Indios" (with A.N.I.M.A.L.)	Social Impact Videos	Won	
Video Prisma Awards (Argentina)	2023	"Canción desaparecida" (with Mabiland)	Social Impact Videos	Won	
Viña del Mar International Song Festival	2005	Juanes	Antorcha de Plata (Silver Torch)	Silver	
Viña del Mar International Song Festival	2005	Juanes	Antorcha de Oro (Gold Torch)	Gold	
Viña del Mar International Song Festival	2009	Juanes	Gaviota de Plata (Silver Gull)	Silver	
Viña del Mar International Song Festival	2009	Juanes	Antorcha de Plata	Silver	
Viña del Mar International Song Festival	2009	Juanes	Antorcha de Oro	Gold	
World Music Awards	2006	Juanes	World's Best Latin Singer	Nominated	
World Music Awards	2013	Juanes	World's Best Male Artist	Nominated	
World Music Awards	2013	Juanes	World's Best Live Act	Nominated	
World Music Awards	2013	Juanes	World's Best Entertainer	Nominated	
Your World Awards	2015	Juanes	Favorite Pop Artist	Nominated	
Your World Awards	2017	Juanes	Favorite Pop Artist by iHeartRadio	Nominated	

== Other accolades ==
List of state honors
Country	City/Gov./Entity	Year	Description	Status	Ref.
Colombia	Valledupar/Mayor Fredys Socarrás	2014	Keys to the City	Honoree	
