= 2004 in Latin music =

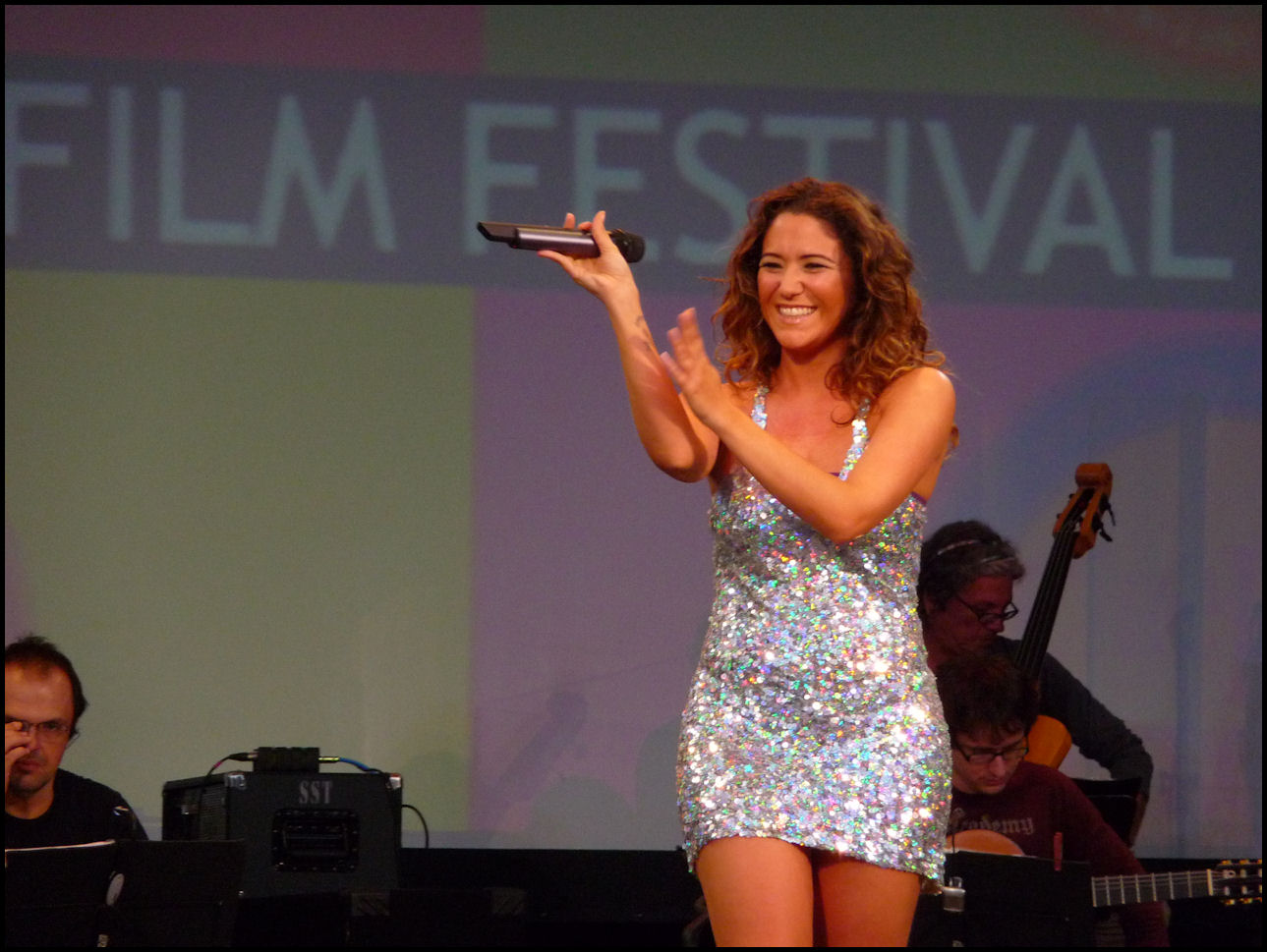
Brazilian singer Maria Rita won the Latin Grammy Award for Best New Artist.

This is a list of notable events in Latin music (i.e. Spanish- and Portuguese-speaking music from Latin America, Europe, and the United States) that took place in 2004.

== Events ==
- July 13 — Puerto Rican rapper Daddy Yankee releases his third studio album, Barrio Fino which becomes the best-selling Tropical Album of 2004 and the best-selling Latin Album and Tropical Album by Billboard of the 2000s decade. It became the first album to reach #1 on the Billboard Latin Rhythm Albums chart. The album won the Lo Nuestro and the Latin Grammy Award for Best Urban Music Album in 2005 and was certified five times by the RIAA. The critical and commercial success of the album popularized reggaeton into the mainstream media.
- September 1 — The 5th Annual Latin Grammy Awards are held at the Shrine Auditorium in Los Angeles, California.
  - Alejandro Sanz is the biggest winner at the award ceremony receiving four awards including Record of the Year and Song of the Year for "No Es lo Mismo" and Album of the Year for No Es lo Mismo.
  - Maria Rita wins Best New Artist.
  - Mexican-American musician Carlos Santana is honored as the Latin Recording Academy Person of the Year.

== Number-ones albums and singles by country ==
- List of number-one singles of 2004 (Spain)
- List of number-one Billboard Top Latin Albums of 2004
- List of number-one Billboard Tropical Albums of 2004
- List of number-one Billboard Latin Pop Albums of 2004
- List of number-one Billboard Hot Latin Songs of 2004
- List of number-one Billboard Hot Tropical Songs of 2004
- List of number-one Billboard Hot Latin Pop Songs of 2004

== Awards ==
- 2004 Premio Lo Nuestro
- 2004 Billboard Latin Music Awards
- 2004 Latin Grammy Awards
- 2004 Tejano Music Awards
- MTV Video Music Awards Latinoamérica 2004

== Albums released ==
=== First quarter ===
==== January ====
Day	Title	Artist	Genre(s)	Singles	Label
6	Eugenio Toussaint Música de Cámara	Various artists			
13	Rock and Roll Yo	Charly García	Rock & Roll, Pop rock		EMI, EMI
13	El Enemy de los Guasíbiri	Tego Calderón	Reggaeton		Jiggiri Records, White Lion Records, BMG U.S. Latin
20	Jolgorio	Perú Negro	Musica Criolla		Times Square Records
27	Diva Platinum Edition	Ivy Queen	Reggaeton	"Quiero Bailar" "Quiero Saber" "Papi Te Quiero" "Guillaera" "Tuya Soy" "Tu No Puedes" "Subelo"	Universal Music Latino
27	Paquito d'Rivera Presents Las Hermanas Marquez	Las Hermanas Márquez			Pimienta Records
27	Cositas Buenas	Paco de Lucía	Flamenco		Universal, Verve Records
27	Apropa't	Savath and Savalas	Downtempo		Warp Records
29	12 Discípulos	Eddie Dee	Reggaeton	"Intro – 12 Discípulos" "Punto y Aparte" "Si Tu No Cuidas Tu Mujer" "El Taladro"	Diamond Music

==== February ====
Day	Title	Artist	Genre(s)	Singles	Label
4	Uma Historia do Samba	Monarco	Samba		Rob Digital
10	Pau-Latina	Paulina Rubio	Mariachi, Ranchera, Euro House, Salsa, Latin pop	"Te Quise Tanto" "Algo Tienes" "Dame Otro Tequila" "Mía"	Universal
10	Bulería	David Bisbal	Europop, Ballad		Vale Music
10	Entre Copas	Michael Salgado	Norteno		Freddie Records
10	Obrigado Brazil Live in Concert	Yo-Yo Ma			Sony Classical
10	Nuestro Turno	K1	Cumbia, Latin Pop		OLE Music
10	El Sobreviviente	Wisin	Reggaeton	"La Gitana" "Saoco"	Lideres, Fresh Production
17	Cada um Belisca um Pouco	Dominguinhos, Sivuca and Oswaldinho	Forro		Biscoito Fino
24	Intimamente	Intocable			DLV, Capitol Records
24	Como Pude Enamorarme de Ti	Patrulla 81	Conjunto, Ranchera		Disa
24	Emprendiendo Vuelo	Grupo Innovacion			
24	Seré Una Niña Buena	Mariana Seoane	Ballad, Norteno, Salsa		Univision Records
24	Hay Que Cambiar	Area 305			Univision Music Group
24	Como Nunca...Como Siempre	Limi-T 21	Merengue, Reggaeton, Bomba, Salsa	"Me Acordaré"	EMI Latin
24	Fantasía o realidad	Álex Ubago	Pop rock, Soft Rock, Ballad	"Aunque No Te Pueda Ver" "Fantasía o Realidad"	DRO
24	Trippin Tropicana	Superlitio	Salsa, Acid Jazz, Funk, House		Walboomers
24	Carta de Amor	Los Ángeles de Charly			
24	De Vuelta a la Vida	Los Rehenes			

==== March ====
Day	Title	Artist	Genre(s)	Singles	Label
2	Travesía	Víctor Manuelle	Salsa, Ballad	"Tengo Ganas" "Lloré Lloré" "Te Propongo"	Sony Discos
9	Recordando Otra Vez	Marcos Witt	Religious, Gospel		CanZion
16	Roots	Gipsy Kings	Flamenco		Nonesuch
16	Que Amarren a Cupido	Joan Sebastian	Mariachi, Norteno		Musart
16	Vivo	Vida			
16	Cuando El Corazón Se Cruza	Alicia Villareal			Mercury
16	Another Kind of Blue: The Latin Side of Miles Davis	Conrad Herwig Nonet	Modal, Latin Jazz		Half Note
16	La Decada	El Poder del Norte			Disa
23	En Vivo Desde Chicago	Grupo Montez de Durango			
23	DJ Kane	DJ Kane			
23	Lipstick	Alejandra Guzmán			BMG U.S. Latin
23	Creciendo	Son de Cali	Salsa, Bolero	"La Sospecha"	Univision Records
23	Sin Palabras (Without Words)	Néstor Torres			Heads Up International
27	As Quatro Estações ao Vivo	Legião Urbana	Pop rock		EMI, Capitol Music
30	Pacto de Sangre	Los Tigres del Norte	Norteno		Universal
30	20 Años Después	Alex Bueno			
30	Contra la Marea	Gisselle	Merengue		Universal Music Latino
30	Cuando Se Quiere Se Puede	Frank Reyes	Bachata		J&N Records
30	Takin' on the World	Stefani Montiel	Tejano		World Records
31	En Vivo	La Arrolladora Banda El Limón	Cumbia, Ranchera		Disa

=== Second quarter ===
==== April ====
Day	Title	Artist	Genre(s)	Singles	Label
6	Locos de Amor	Los Horóscopos de Durango	Cumbia, Norteno		Disa
13	Maria Rita	Maria Rita	Bossanova, Latin Jazz, MPB		WEA Music
13	Sin Miedo	Michael Stuart	Salsa		RMM Records, Universal Music Latino
13	In Tokyo	João Gilberto	Bossa Nova		Universal, Edge Music
13	MTV ao Vivo	Ivete Sangalo	Axe, Batucada, MPB		Universal Music, Mercury
20	Acústico MTV	Legião Urbana	Pop rock, Alternative Rock, Post-Punk, Folk Rock, Acoustic		EMI
20	Amor y Lagrimas	Adán Sánchez	Corrido, Norteno		Sony Discos
20	Mi Tentacion	Rey Ruiz	Salsa, Ballad	"Creo en el Amor" "Mi Tentación" "El Diablo Anda Suelto"	Sony Discos
20	Solo Contigo	David Lee Garza and Los Musicales	Tejano		DLG Records
20	La Verdad	Fulanito	Merengue		Cutting Records
20	Com o Pé no Forró	Toninho Horta			Minas Records
20	Fantasia Brasileira	Orquestra de Câmara Rio Strings			DiscMedi Blau
27	Sea	Jorge Drexler	Pop rock		Virgin
27	Querencia	Mayte Martín	Flamenco		Virgin
27	Angel Meléndez & the 911 Mambo Orchestra	Angel Meléndez & the 911 Mambo Orchestra	Merengue, Mambo, Cha-Cha, Rumba, Cumbia, Guaguanco, Salsa, Bolero		Latin Street Music
27	The Body Acoustic	Bob Mintzer, Giovanni Hidalgo, Andy Gonzalez, David Chesky and Randy Brecker	Latin Jazz, Post Bop		Chesky Records
27	Uno, Dos: Bandera	Control Machete	Conscious		Universal Music Latino

==== May ====
Day	Title	Artist	Genre(s)	Singles	Label
4	Stop	Franco De Vita	Ballad	"Tu de Qué Vas" "Si la Ves" "Ay Dios"	Sony Music
4	MTV Unplugged	Diego Torres	Vocal		BMG Argentina, Ariola
4	The Venezuelan Zinga Son, Vol. 1	Los Amigos Invisibles	House, Latin, Disco		Luaka Bop
4	Los Número Uno del Pasito Duranguense	Conjunto Atardecer	Pachanga, Ranchera		Universal Music Latino
4	Motivando a la Yal	Zion & Lennox	Reggaeton		White Lion Records, Jiggiri Records, Boricua Guerrero Productions
4	Eternamente Enamorado	Adolfo Urias			
4	Objetivo Fama: En la Voz de Sus Estrellas	Various artists			
11	Jerry Gonzalez y Los Piratas del Flamenco	Jerry Gonzalez y Los Piratas del Flamenco	Afro-Cuban Jazz, Post Bop, Latin Jazz		Sunnyside
11	Puro Escandalo	Crooked Stilo			Headliners Records LLC
11	Incité	Lenine			
11	Sentenciados	Baby Rasta & Gringo	Reggaeton		Universal Music Latino
18	¿La Calle es Tuya?	Estopa	Pop rock, Rumba		Ariola, BMG Espana
18	Infame	Babasónicos	Alternative Rock		Discos Popart
18	Seducción	Jennifer Peña	Cumbia, Norteno	"Vivo y Muero en Tu Piel"	Universal Music Group
18	Bachá	Bachá			
25	Inolvidable	Candido and Graciela			Chesky Records
25	Flor de Amor	Omara Portuondo	Afro-Cuban Jazz		Nonesuch
25	Con Mis Propias Manos	Lupillo Rivera			Univision
25	Olvidarte Nunca	Guardianes del Amor			
25	Yo Te Propongo	Palomo	Norteno		Disa
25	Pasión de Gavilanes (soundtrack)	Various artists	Cumbia		RTI Colombia, Telemundo Discos, Laguna Records, FM, Caracol Television
25	Con Experienca y Juventud	Los Huracanes del Norte			
25	Con la London Metropolitan Orchestra, Vol. 2	Ricardo Montaner	Ballad, Vocal	"Desesperado"	Warner Music Latina

==== June ====
Day	Title	Artist	Genre(s)	Singles	Label
1	Adios Compita: Tributo a Adan Chalino Sanchez	Various artists			
7	Una Mujer, Un Sueño	Ana Bárbara	Ranchera, Norteno		Fonovisa Records
8	The Last Don: Live, Vol. 1	Don Omar	Reggaeton, hip hop	"Pobre Diabla"	VI Music, Universal Music Latino
8	Buen Vida	Alejandro Lerner			
8	En Vivo	Los Rehenes			
10	Carnaval Eletrônico	Daniela Mercury	House, Latin, Drum n Bass		BMG Brasil, Ariola
15	El Quinto Trago	Grupo Bryndis			Disa
15	Komp 104.9 Radio Compa	Akwid			Universal Music Grp
15	Albita Llegó	Albita	Salsa		Angels' Dawn Records
15	Isla Menor	Raimundo Amador			Universal
15	Ahora Sí!	Cachao	Mambo, Descarga, Son, Guajira		Univision Records
15	Across 110th Street	Spanish Harlem Orchestra featuring Rubén Blades	Salsa, Cubano		Libertad Records
15	En Directo: Lo Que Te Conté Mientras Te Hacías la Dormida	La Oreja de Van Gogh	Pop rock, Europop		Sony Music, Sony Music
15	El viaje a ninguna parte	Enrique Bunbury	Indie Rock		Hispavox, Capitol Music
15	Una Sangre (One Blood)	Lila Downs	Cumbia, Fusion, Folk		Narada World, Narada World, Narada World
15	En Concierto	Los Cardenales de Nuevo León			D Disa Latin Music, S. De R.L. De C.V.
21	Mi Tambor	Paoli Mejias	Latin Jazz		Paoli Mejias
22	La Trayectoria	Luny Tunes	Reggaeton		Universal Music Latino, Mas Flow Incorporated
22	Street Signs	Ozomatli			Concord Records
29	Veintisiete	Los Temerarios	Ranchera, Mariachi	"Que de Raro Tiene"	Fonovisa
29	Mi Otro Sentimiento	Graciela Beltrán	Conjunto, Tejano, Ranchera, Norteno, Banda		Univision Records
29	Los Bacatranes	Trebol Clan	Reggaeton, Rhythm & Blues		Universal Music Latino, Gold Star Music
29	Un Lamento Que Llego Para Quedarse	Banda Lamento Show de Durango			
29	Eco	Jorge Drexler	Singer-Songwriter		Warner Music Latina

=== Third quarter ===
==== July ====
Day	Title	Artist	Genre(s)	Singles	Label
8	Amar Sin Mentiras	Marc Anthony	Latin Pop	"Ahora Quien" "Valió la Pena" "Se Esfuma Tu Amor" "Amigo"	Sony Music International, Sony Music International
13	Barrio Fino	Daddy Yankee	Reggaeton	"King Daddy" "Gasolina" "Lo Que Pasó, Pasó" "No Me Dejes Solo" "Like You" "Tu Príncipe"	Universal Music & Video Distribution, VI Music
13	En Vivo Desde Dallas, Texas	Patrulla 81			
13	Dios Disfrute a la Reina	Celia Cruz	Salsa, Bolero, Hardcore Hip-Hop		Sony Music
13	Imperfecta-Imperfect	JD Natasha	Alternative Rock, Pop rock		EMI Latin
20	Emigrante (Electrotango)	Tanghetto	Tango		Constitution Music
20	Resucitar	Gian Marco Zignago	Pop rock, Ballad		Sony Discos
20	Rezaré	Pesado	Norteno, Tejano, Ranchera		Warner Music Latina
22	Comienzos	NG2	Salsa		Sony Discos
25	Para Sobrevivir	Duelo	Tejano		Universal Music Group Mexico
27	Afro-Cuban Jazz	Mario Bauza	Mambo, Latin Jazz, Bolero, Cha-Cha, Descarga		Caiman Records, Caiman Records
27	Valió la Pena	Marc Anthony	Salsa	"Valió la Pena" (Salsa version) "Ahora Quien" (Salsa version) "Tu Amor Me Hace Bien" (Salsa version) "Se Esfuma Tu Amor" (Salsa version) "Volando Entre Tus Brazos" (Salsa version)	Sony Discos
27	A Cambio de Que?	Alacranes Musical			Univision Records, Universal Music Group Mexico
27	Si Te Vuelves a Enamorar	El Coyote y su Banda Tierra Santa	Banda		EMI Latin
27	Puro Sentimiento	Charlie Zaa	Ballad, Bolero		OLE Music, OLE Music

==== August ====
Day	Title	Artist	Genre(s)	Singles	Label
2	Todo A Su Tiempo	Divino	Reggaeton	Se Activaron Los Anormales	Machete Music
3	Sin Riendas	Bronco			
3	Coral	David Sánchez			Columbia
3	En Vivo	K-Paz de la Sierra			
10	Fernando Ortega	Fernando Ortega	Acoustic, Soft Rock		Curb Records
10	En Vivo 2004	Los Toros Band	Merengue		Universal Music Latino
10	En la Cumbre	Polo Urias			
12	Para Ellos	John Santos and El Coro Folklórico Kindembo	Afro-Cuban, Jibaro		Machete Records
14	En Vivo	Enanitos Verdes	Alternative Rock, Soft Music		Universal Music Latino
14	Flores de Alquiler	La 5ª Estación	Pop rock, Ballad	"El Sol No Regresa" "Algo Más"	Ariola
17	Za Za Za	Grupo Climax			
17	Ed Calle Plays Santana	Ed Calle			Pimienta Records
17	Piano/Drums/Bass	Negroni's Trio	Latin Jazz		Universal Music Spain
17	En Vivo	Beto y Sus Canarios			
20	Me Gusta Estar Contigo	Sergio Vega			Sony Music Mexico
24	Pafuera Telarañas	Bebe	Acoustic, Soft Rock, Pop rock		Virgin, EMI
24	Jesús Siempre Llega A Tiempo	Samuel Hernández			Not On Label
24	Como Me Acuerdo	Draco Rosa			Sony Music
24	Estelar	Volumen Cero			Warner Music Latina
24	Auténtico	Gilberto Santa Rosa	Salsa	"Sombra Loca" "Enseñame a Vivir Sin Ti" "Piedras y Flores"	Sony Discos, Sony Discos
24	Sigo Pensando En Ti	Volumen X			EMI Latin
24	Collection Two	Las Guanabanas	Reggaeton		Flow Music
31	Para Ti	Juan Luis Guerra & 4.40	Merengue, Latin Christian	"Las Avispas" "Para Ti" "Soldado"	Universal
31	El Rock de Mi Pueblo	Carlos Vives	Vallenato	"Como Tu"	EMI Latin
31	Land of the Sun	Charlie Haden	Post Bop, Contemporary Jazz		Verve Records
31	Metizo	Revólver			
31	No Soy de Nadie	Pepe Aguilar			Sony Music

==== September ====
Day	Title	Artist	Genre(s)	Singles	Label
7	A Corazón Abierto	Alejandro Fernández	Nueva Cancion	"Me Dediqué a Perderte" "Que Lastima" "Canta Corazón"	Columbia, Columbia, Columbia
7	Vaidade	Djavan	MPB		Luandra Records
7	Intimamente	Domenic Marte	Bachata	"Ven Tú" "La Quiero" "Ya Que Te Vas a Ir"	J&N Records
14	Alma Ranchera	Rocío Dúrcal	Ranchera		BMG Spain, RCA
14	Los Rayos	Vicentico			BMG Music Spain, S.A., RCA
14	Tradicional	Ana Gabriel	Ranchera		Sony Discos
14	A México...Con Amor	José Feliciano		"Cien Años"	Wrasse Records
14	Fabricando Fantasias	Tito Nieves	Salsa	"Fabricando Fantasias" "Ya No Queda Nada"	Sony Discos, SGZ Entertainment
21	Sweet & Sour, Hot y Spicy	Ely Guerra	Alternative Rock, Pop rock		EMI, Capitol Records
21	Generaraciones	Ramón Orlando			
28	Mi Sangre	Juanes	Pop rock	"Nada Valgo Sin Tu Amor" "La Camisa Negra" "Volverte a Ver" "Para Tu Amor" "Lo Que Me Gusta a Mí" "Rosario Tijeras" "No Siento Penas"	Surco, Universal
28	Saboréalo	Elvis Crespo	Merengue	"Hora Enamorada" "7 Días" "Pan Comio'"	OLE Music
28	Sin Vergüenza	Bacilos			Warner Music Latina
28	Esperanza	Jae-P	Conscious		Univision Records
28	Paseo	Gonzalo Rubalcaba and New Cuban Quartet	Latin Jazz		Blue Note
28	Aguadulce	Tomatito	Flamenco, Rumba		Universal
28	Glazunov: Symphony No. 5; The Seasons	José Serebrier	Neo-Romantic		Warner Classics
28	Sobre Los Rieles	Los Rieleros del Norte	Norteno		Fonovisa Records, Univision Music Group
28	La Niña de la Mochila Azul, Vol. 1	Amy	Soundtrack		Universal, Televisa
28	Que Me Quiten Lo Bailado	Liberación	Conjunto, Cumbia, Ranchera, Norteno, Banda		Disa
28	Con la Bendición de Dios	Pablo Montero	Bolero, Ranchera		BMG U.S. Latin, RCA
28	En Su Salsa	Andy & Lucas	Salsa	"Son de Amores" (Salsa version)	Ariola, BMG Spain

=== Fourth quarter ===
==== October ====
Day	Title	Artist	Genre(s)	Singles	Label
1	Bosillos	Pedro Guerra			
2	Bajo Cero	Pablo Ziegler, Quique Sinesi and Walter Castro	Tango		Zoho
4	Donos do Brasil	Raimundo Fagner	MPB		Indie Records
5	Fuego	A.B. Quintanilla and Kumbia Kings	Cumbia		EMI
5	Nunca Te Olvidaré	Los Angeles Azules	Cumbia		Disa Latin Music
5	Clase Aparte	Yaga y Mackie	Reggaeton		Diamond Music
12	Tiempo de Navidad	Marcos Witt	Gospel, Vocal		CanZion, Sony Discos
12	Poncho at Montreux	Poncho Sanchez	Latin Jazz		Silverline, Concord Picante
12	El Grupo Joven De La Musica Duranguense	Brazeros Musical de Durango	Corrido, Ranchera		D Disa Latin Music, S. De R.L. De C.V.
12	Flow la Discoteka	DJ Nelson	Reggaeton		Flow Music, Universal Music Latino
12	Contra la Corriente	Noriega	Reggaeton		Flow Music, Cutting Latino
19	Pensando en Ti	K-Paz de la Sierra			Univision Records
19	Hasta El Fin	Monchy & Alexandra	Bachata, Ballad	"Perdidos" "Hasta El Fin" "Tu Sin Mi y Yo Sin Ti"	J & N Records
26	Escucha	Laura Pausini	Soft Rock, Pop rock	"Escucha" "Viveme" "Como Si No Nos Hubiéramos Amado"	Atlantic
26	Con Todo Respeto	Molotov	Alternative Rock		Surco
26	Cantos de Agua Dulce (Songs of the Sweet Water)	Marta Gómez			Chesky Records
26	Así Soy...	Oscar D'León	Salsa		Sony Discos
26	Loca de Amar	Ana Bárbara			Fonovisa Records, Univision Music Group Mexico
26	Para El Pueblo	La Mafia	Tejano		Urbano Records
26	Alma Sertaneja	Roberta Miranda	Country, MPB, Ballad		Som Livre
26	En Vivo	Bronco: El Gigante De America			
26	La Raza Anda Acelerada	Los Razas			

==== November ====
Day	Title	Artist	Genre(s)	Singles	Label
2	Razón de Sobra	Marco Antonio Solís	Norteno		FonoVisa
2	Mi Homenaje Gigante a la Musica Norteña	Don Francisco	Norteno, Spoken Word		Univision Records
2	Todo el Año	Obie Bermúdez	Ballad	"Todo el Año"	EMI Latin
2	Celebra Conmigo	Kinito Méndez	Merengue		J & N Records
2	En Vivo	Banda el Recodo	Ranchera, Cumbia		Fonovisa Records, Universal Music Group Mexico, S.A. De C.V.
2	En Vivo	Wilson das Neves			
2	Houston: Rodeo Live	Jennifer Peña	Tejano, Bolero, Noteno		Univision Records
8	Confí de Fuá	José Mercé	Flamenco		Virgin Music, EMI
8	Gaitapontocom	Renato Borghetti			
9	Pa' Corridos	Lupillo Rivera	Corrido, Banda, Norteno		Univision Records, Universal Music Group Mexico
9	México en la Piel	Luis Miguel	Vocal, Ballad, Bolero	"Que Seas Feliz" "Sabes una Cosa" "Échame a Mi la Culpa"	Warner Music Latina
9	Diana Reyes	Diana Reyes			Capitol Latin
9	El Que Habla Con Las Manos	Eliel	Reggaeton		VI Music
12	Luny Tunes Presents La Mision 4: The Take Over	Various artists			
16	Chosen Few: El Documental	Various artists	Soundtrack, Reggaeton		Chosen Few Emerald Entertainment, Urban Box Office
16	Aquí Estamos y...¡de Verdad!	El Gran Combo de Puerto Rico	Salsa		Sony Discos
16	Canta Grandes Sucessos	Leondardo			BMG, RCA
16	Grandes Éxitos 1991–2004	Alejandro Sanz	Latin pop	"Tu No Tienes Alma"	Warner Music Latina
21	Real	Ivy Queen	Reggaeton	"Chika Ideal" "Rociarlos" "Dile" "Angel Caído"	Universal Music Latino
23	El Virus del Amor	Los Tucanes de Tijuana	Norteno		Universal
23	Fiesta En La Sierra	Los Tucanes de Tijuana			
23	The Kings of the Beats	Luny Tunes	Reggaeton, Instrumental		Universal Music Latino
23	Nostalgia	Manny Manuel			Universal Music Latino
23	Como Nunca	Charlie Cruz	Salsa		Sony Discos
23	Hoy Quiero Soñar	Cristian Castro	Ballad	"Te Buscaría" "Una Canción Para Ti"	BMG U.S. Latin
23	Vida Escante	Nicky Jam	Reggaeton		Pina Records, Universal Music Latino
23	En Mi País	Various artists			
24	Solo	Ricardo Arjona	Ballad	"Por Qué Es Tan Cruel El Amor""	Warner Music Mexico, Warner Music Argentina
30	Cómo Nace el Universo	Gloria Trevi	Latin Pop		Ariola, BMG Mexico

==== December ====
Day	Title	Artist	Genre(s)	Singles	Label
7	Resistiré	Toño Rosario	Merengue	"Resistiré"	Universal Music Latino
14	La Rebelión de los Hombres Rana	El Último de la Fila	Folk Rock, Pop rock		Chrysalis, Perro Records
14	Bebop Timba	Raphael Cruz			
14	La Fuerza del Destino	Fey	Synth-Pop	"La Fuerza del Destino" "Barco a Venus"	EMI Latin
14	Voltage AC	Julio Voltio	Reggaeton		White Lion Records, Jiggiri Records
20	Som De Adoradores - Ao Vivo	Aline Barros			
20	A Madrinha Do Samba / Ao Vivo Convida	Beth Carvalho	Samba, MPB		Indie Records
21	Los Anormales	Héctor el Father	Reggaeton		Universal Music Latino, Gold Star Music
21	On My Own	Amarfis y la Banda Atakke	Merengue	"Lamento Boliviano"	J & N Records
28	Ni un Pelo de Inocente	Adrenalina	Alternative Rock		SV Records And Videos
28	La Fiesta Continúa!!!	Christell	Karaoke		Warner Strategic Merketing Chile, TVN Musicavision
28	Riberas	Cuarteto de Cuerdas Buenos Aires and Paquito D'Rivera	Afro-Cuban Jazz, Bop, Latin Jazz, Post Bop, Classical, Tango		Epsa Music
28	Tradicion	Tito Rojas	Salsa	"Quiero"	Musical Productions

=== Unknown release dates ===
Title	Artist	Genre(s)	Singles	Label
Tropicana All Stars Recuerda A Benny Moré	Tropicana All Stars	Cubano		Regu Records
Para Caymmi: De Nana, Dori E Danilo	Nana, Dori and Danilof	MPB, Samba		Wea Music
Tamo Aí na Atividade	Charlie Brown Jr.	Pop rock, Punk, Conscious		EMI
Polkas, Gritos Y Acordeónes	David Lee Garza, Joel Jose Guzman, Sunny Sauceda			Guzman Fox Records
Cantando Historias	Ivan Lins	MPB		EMI Music Brasil Ltda.
Buena Vista Social Club Presents: Manuel Guajiro Mirabal	Manuel "El Guajiro" Mirabal	Afro-Cuban Jazz		World Circuit
Luz En Mi Vida	Pablo Olivares			Editorial Vida
Día de Independencia	Rojo	Gospel		ReyVol Records
Deixa O Teu Rio Me Levar – Ao Vivo	Soraya Moraes	Gospel		Line Records
Eletracústico	Gilberto Gil	Bossanova, Samba, Vocal		Wea Music
Ke Zafados	Ke Zafados			
Poder Payasónico	Los Payasónicos			DLV, Capitol Records
Sin Restricciones	Miranda!	Synth-Pop		Pelo Music
Rebelde	RBD	Pop rock, Ballad	"Rebelde" "Solo Quédate En Silencio" "Sálvame" "Un Poco de Tu Amor"	EMI, Televisa, Capitol Records
El recital	Gustavo Pena	Singer-songerwriter		Ayui

== Best-selling records ==
=== Best-selling albums ===
The following is a list of the top 10 best-selling Latin albums in the United States in 2004, according to Billboard.

Rank	Album	Artist
1	La Historia Continúa...	Marco Antonio Solis
2	Za Za Za	Grupo Climax
3	Amar Sin Mentiras	Marc Anthony
4	Tributo al Amor	Los Temerarios
5	Veintisiete	Los Temerarios
6	Pau-Latina	Paulina Rubio
7	En Vivo Desde Chicago	Grupo Montez de Durango
8	Lo Que te Conté Mientras te Hacías la Dormida	La Oreja de Van Gogh
9	De Viaje	Sin Bandera
10	La Historia	A.B. Quintanilla and Kumbia Kings

=== Best-performing songs ===
The following is a list of the top 10 best-performing Latin songs in the United States in 2004, according to Billboard.

Rank	Single	Artist
1	"Más Que Tu Amigo"	Marco Antonio Solís
2	"Te Quise Tanto"	Paulina Rubio
3	"Cuidarte el Alma"	Chayanne
4	"Y Todo Queda en Nada"	Ricky Martin
5	"Vivo y Muero en Tu Piel"	Jennifer Peña
6	"Que de Raro Tiene"	Los Temerarios
7	"Ahora Quién"	Marc Anthony
8	"Tengo Ganas"	Víctor Manuelle
9	"Que Lloro"	Sin Bandera
10	"Tu de Que Vas"	Franco De Vita

== Births ==
- June 22 – Loulu Gilberto, Brazilian singer

== Deaths ==
- March 27 – Adán Sánchez, Mexican singer (b. 1984)
