= Premio Lo Nuestro 2006 =

Latin Music awards show

18th Lo Nuestro Awards
- Date: February 23, 2006
- Location: American Airlines Arena
- Country: United States
- Hosted by: René Strickler, Patricia Manterola

Television/radio coverage
- Network: Univision

The 18th Lo Nuestro Awards was held on February 23, 2006 at the American Airlines Arena in Miami. The nominees were announced on December 12, 2005, during a press conference televised live on the Univision Network morning show ¡Despierta América!. The show was co-hosted by René Strickler and Patricia Manterola.

== Nominees and winners ==
This is the full list of nominees and winners of the 18th Lo Nuestro Award.

=== Lifetime Achievement Award ===
- Ana Gabriel

=== Pop ===
==== Album of the Year ====
- Fijación Oral Vol. 1 – Shakira
  - Escucha – Laura Pausini
  - Fuego – Kumbia Kings
  - Paso a Paso – Luis Fonsi
  - Todo el Año – Obie Bermúdez

==== Male Artist ====
- Luis Fonsi
  - Alejandro Fernández
  - Obie Bermúdez
  - Reyli

==== Female Artist ====
- Laura Pausini
  - Jimena
  - Julieta Venegas
  - Paulina Rubio

==== Group or Duo ====
- Shakira & Alejandro Sanz
  - Aleks Syntek y Ana Torroja
  - Kumbia Kings
  - La 5ª Estación

==== Song of the Year ====
- "La Tortura" – Shakira y Alejandro Sanz
  - "La Camisa Negra" – Juanes
  - "Nada Es Para Siempre" – Luis Fonsi
  - "Víveme" – Laura Pausini
  - "Volverte a ver" – Juanes

==== Best New Soloist or Group of the Year ====
- RBD
  - Lena
  - Lu
  - Reik

=== Rock ===
==== Album of the Year ====
- Con Todo Respeto – Molotov
  - Andrea Echeverri – Andrea Echeverri
  - Consejo – La Secta AllStar
  - Consuelo en Domingo – Enjambre
  - En el Cielo de Tu Boca – Circo

==== Artist of the Year ====
- Juanes
  - Circo
  - Enjambre
  - La Secta AllStar

==== Song of the Year ====
- "Nada Valgo Sin Tu Amor" – Juanes
  - "A Eme O" – Andrea Echeverri
  - "Amateur" – Molotov
  - "Biografía" – Enjambre
  - "Un Accidente" – Circo

=== Tropical ===
==== Album of the Year ====
- Una Nueva Mujer – Olga Tañón
  - Amanecer Contigo – Frankie Negrón
  - Aquí Estamos y De Verdad – El Gran Combo
  - Hasta el Fin – Monchy y Alexandra
  - Ironía – Andy Andy

==== Male Artist ====
- Marc Anthony
  - Carlos Vives
  - Gilberto Santa Rosa
  - Juan Luis Guerra

==== Female Artist ====
- Olga Tañón
  - Brenda K. Starr
  - Melina León
  - Milly Quezada

==== Group or Duo ====
- Aventura
  - El Gran Combo
  - Monchy y Alexandra
  - N'Klabe

==== Song of the Year ====
- "Bandolero" – Olga Tañón
  - "Se Esfuma Tu Amor" – Marc Anthony
  - "Hasta el Fin" – Monchy y Alexandra
  - "Perdidos" – Monchy y Alexandra
  - "Que Ironía" – Andy Andy

==== Merengue Artist ====
- Olga Tañón
  - La Gran Banda
  - Los Toros Band
  - Juan Luis Guerra

==== Salsa Artist ====
- Marc Anthony
  - El Gran Combo
  - Gilberto Santa Rosa
  - Tito Nieves

==== Traditional Artist ====
- Aventura
  - Andy Andy
  - Carlos Vives
  - Monchy y Alexandra

==== New Soloist or Group of the Year ====
- Xtreme
  - Ciclón
  - Edgar Daniel
  - T4

=== Mexican Music ===
==== Album of the Year ====
- Diez – Intocable
  - Directo al Corazón – Los Tigres del Norte
  - Hoy Como Ayer – Conjunto Primavera
  - Pensando en Ti – K-Paz de la Sierra
  - Razón de Sobra – Marco Antonio Solís

==== Male Artist ====
- Marco Antonio Solís
  - Luis Miguel
  - Pepe Aguilar
  - Sergio Vega

==== Female Artist ====
- Ana Bárbara
  - Diana Reyes
  - Isabela
  - Mariana

==== Group or Duo ====
- Intocable
  - Beto y sus Canarios
  - Conjunto Primavera
  - K-Paz de la Sierra

==== Song of the Year ====
- "Aire" – Intocable
  - "Eres Divina" – Patrulla 81
  - "Está Llorando Mi Corazón" – Beto y sus Canarios
  - "Hoy Como Ayer" – Conjunto Primavera
  - "Volveré" – K-Paz de la Sierra

==== Band of the Year ====
- Banda el Recodo
  - Beto y sus Canarios
  - K-Paz de la Sierra
  - Patrulla 81

==== Grupera Artist ====
- Los Temerarios
  - Marco Antonio Solís
  - Bronco - El Gigante de América
  - Grupo Innovación

==== Norteño Artist ====
- Intocable
  - Conjunto Primavera
  - Huracanes del Norte
  - Los Tigres del Norte

==== Ranchera Artist ====
- Vicente Fernández
  - Luis Miguel
  - Ezequiel Peña
  - Pepe Aguilar

==== New Soloist or Group of the Year ====
- La Autoridad de la Sierra
  - Los Elegidos
  - Beto Terrazas
  - Zaino

=== Urban ===
==== Album of the Year ====
- Mas Flow 2 – Luny Tunes & Baby Ranks
  - Chosen Few El Documental – Chosen Few
  - Desahogo – Vico C
  - Flow la Discoteka – DJ Nelson
  - Los K-Becillas – Master Joe & O.G. Black

==== Artist of the Year ====
- Daddy Yankee
  - Don Omar
  - Master Joe & O.G. Black
  - Wisin & Yandel

==== Song of the Year ====
- "Lo Que Pasó, Pasó" – Daddy Yankee
  - "Mayor que yo" – Baby Ranks, Daddy Yankee, Héctor "El Father", Tonny Tun Tun & Wisin & Yandel
  - "Mírame" – Daddy Yankee
  - "Rakata" – Wisin & Yandel
  - "Reggaetón Latino" – Don Omar

=== Video of the Year ===
- "Nada Es Para Siempre" – Luis Fonsi
  - "Víveme" – Laura Pausini
  - "Que Seas Feliz" – Luis Miguel
  - "No" – Shakira
  - "Desahogo" – Vico C
  - "Nace" – Anasol
