= Lo Nuestro Award for Rock/Alternative Song of the Year =

Latin music award

Lo Nuestro Awards for Rock/Alternative Song of the Year
- Awarded for: Rock/Alternative Song of the Year
- Country: United States
- Presented by: Univision
- First award: 2006
- Final award: 2013

Highlights
- Most awards: Juanes and Maná (3)
- Website: univision.com/premiolonuestro

The Lo Nuestro Award for Rock/Alternative Song of the Year was an honor presented annually by American network Univision. The Lo Nuestro Awards have been held annually since 1989. The accolade was established to recognize the most talented performers of Latin music. The nominees and winners were originally selected by a voting poll conducted among program directors of Spanish-language radio stations in the United States and also based on chart performance on Billboard Latin music charts, with the results being tabulated and certified by the accounting firm Arthur Andersen. At the present time, the winners are selected by the audience through an online survey. The trophy is shaped in the form of a treble clef. The categories awarded were for the Pop, Tropical/Salsa, Regional Mexican and Music Video fields before the 2000 awards, and from 2006 onwards categories were expanded and included a Song of the Year award in the Rock field.

The award was first presented to "Nada Valgo Sin Tu Amor" by Colombian singer Juanes, who was also the most nominated solo artist with nine nominations. Mexican band Maná was the most nominated ensemble and biggest winners in the category, with three wins out of ten nominations. Chilean band La Ley won the award twice. In 2012, Mexican performer Alejandra Guzmán became the only female singer to be awarded for the song "Día de Suerte". The following year, all the categories in the Rock Field (Artist, Album and Song of the Year) were merged into the Pop Field.

== Winners and nominees ==
Listed below are the winners of the award for each year, as well as the other nominees.

| Key | Meaning |
|---|---|
| ‡ | Indicates the winning song |

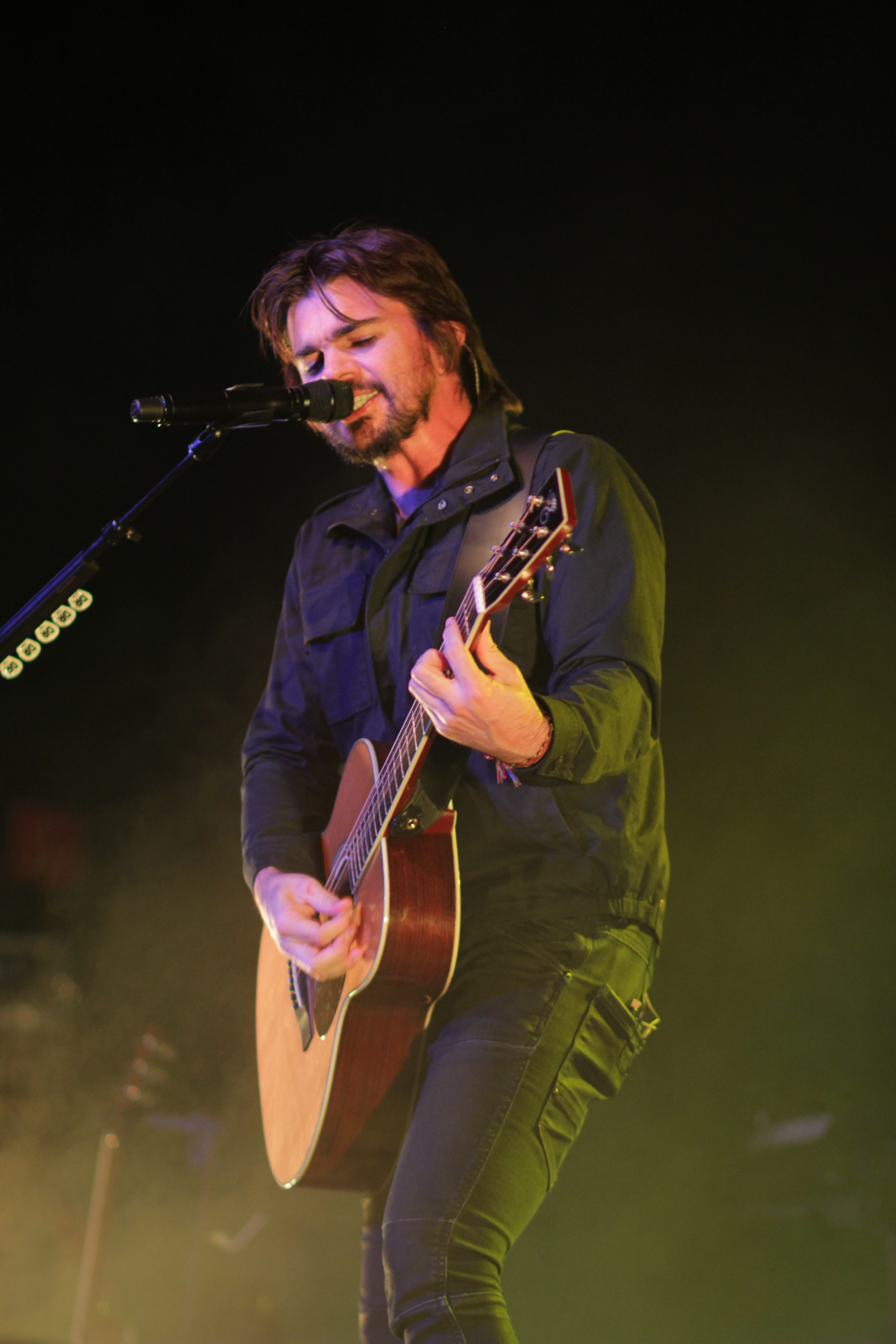
Colombian performer Juanes (pictured in 2012), the first winner.

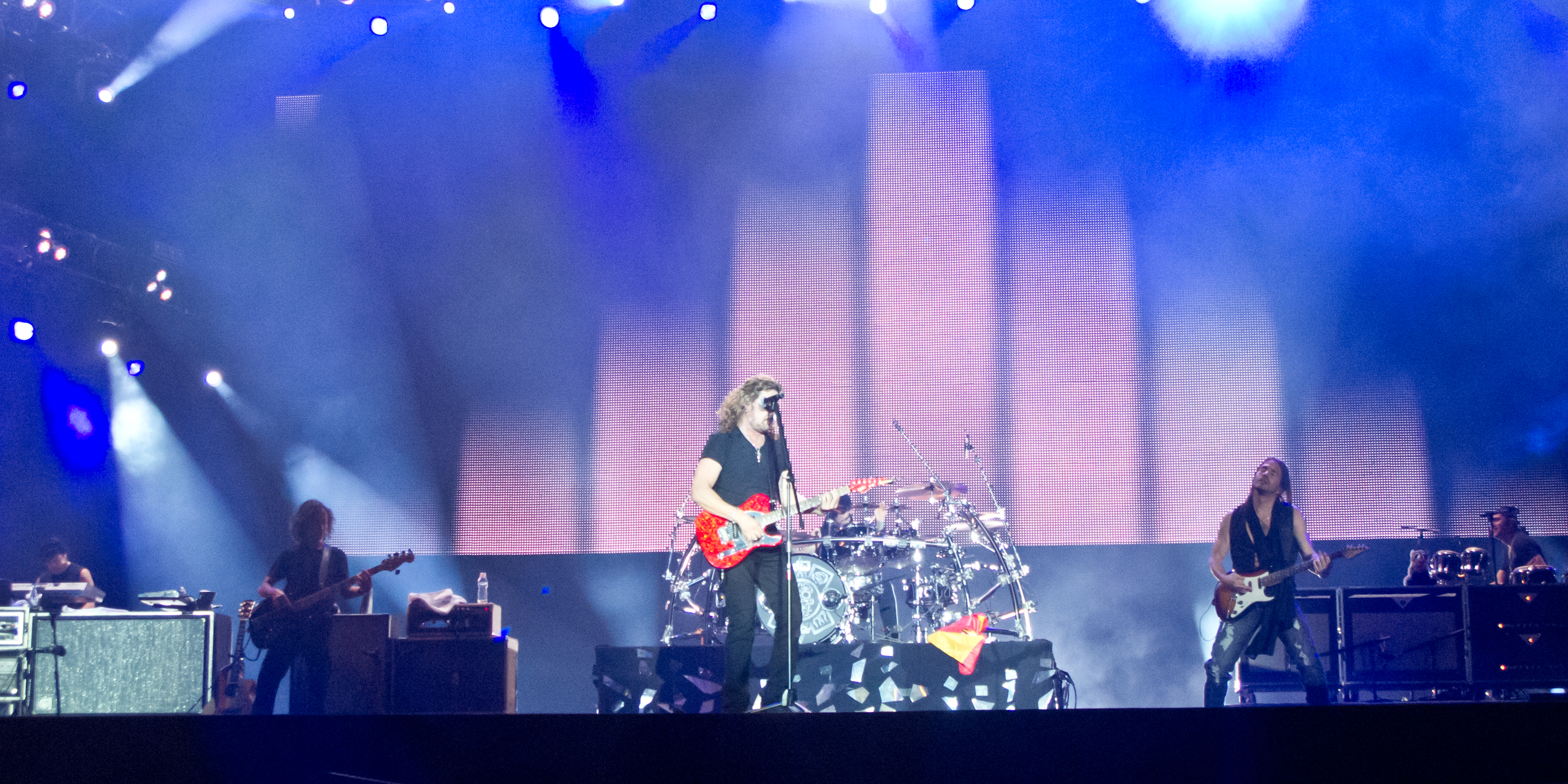
Mexican band Maná (pictured in 2012), the biggest winners in the category, with three wins.

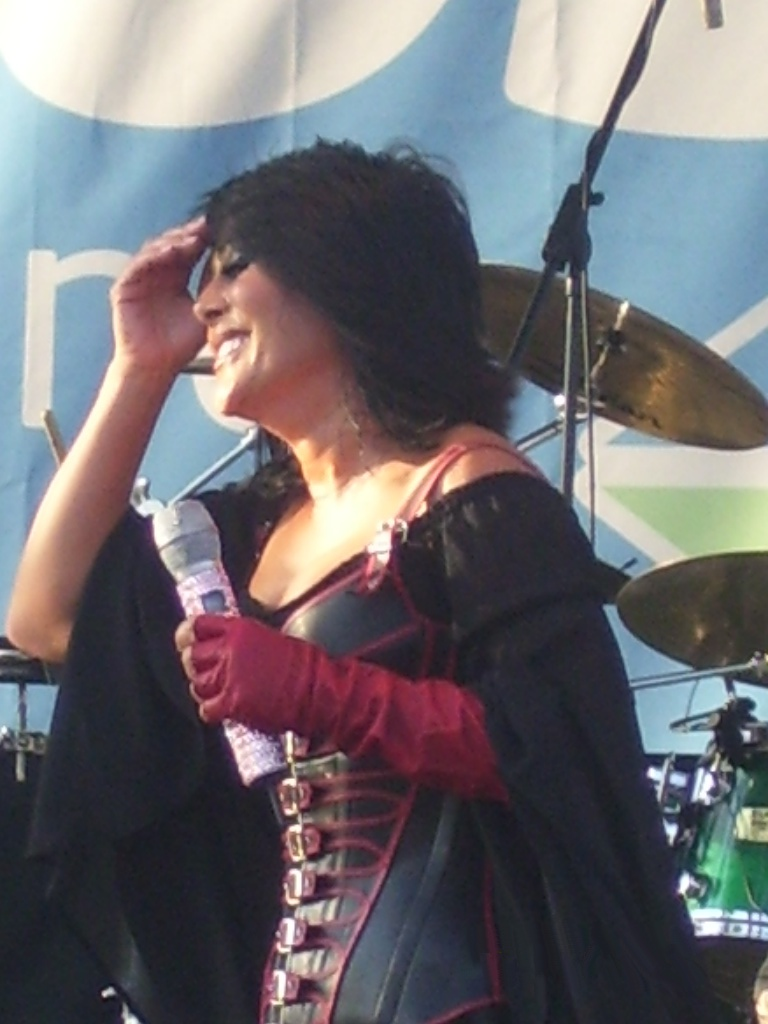
Alejandra Guzmán (pictured in 2008) the only female singer to be awarded

| Year | Song | Performer(s) | Ref |
|---|---|---|---|
| 2006 (18th) | "Nada Valgo Sin Tu Amor"‡ | Juanes | |
| 2006 (18th) | "A Eme O" | Andrea Echeverri | |
| 2006 (18th) | "Amateur" | Molotov | |
| 2006 (18th) | "Biografía" | Enjambre | |
| 2006 (18th) | "Un Accidente" | Circo | |
| 2007 (19th) | "Labios Compartidos"‡ | Maná | |
| 2007 (19th) | "Carismático" | Babasónicos | |
| 2007 (19th) | "Lo Que Me Gusta a Mí" | Juanes | |
| 2007 (19th) | "Mariposas" | Enanitos Verdes | |
| 2007 (19th) | "Volverte a Amar" | Alejandra Guzmán | |
| 2008 (20th) | "Bendita Tu Luz"‡ | Maná featuring Juan Luis Guerra | |
| 2008 (20th) | "Enamorado" | Gustavo Laureano | |
| 2008 (20th) | "Manda Una Señal" | Maná | |
| 2008 (20th) | "Ojalá Pudiera Borrarte" | Maná | |
| 2008 (20th) | "Sentimettal" | Moderatto | |
| 2009 (21st) | "Me Enamora"‡ | Juanes | |
| 2009 (21st) | "Arde el Cielo" | Maná | |
| 2009 (21st) | "Gotas de Agua Dulce" | Juanes | |
| 2009 (21st) | "Si No Te Hubieras Ido" | Maná | |
| 2009 (21st) | "Tres" | Juanes | |
| 2010 (22nd) | "Háblame"‡ | Beto Cuevas | |
| 2010 (22nd) | "Dame Tu Corazón" | Los Rufianes | |
| 2010 (22nd) | "Déjalos Que Hablen" | La Secta AllStar | |
| 2010 (22nd) | "Mariposa Mía" | Vivanativa | |
| 2010 (22nd) | "Should I Stay or Should I Go" | Los Fabulosos Cadillacs | |
| 2011 (23rd) | "Yerbatero"‡ | Juanes | |
| 2011 (23rd) | "Esto es Vida" | Draco | |
| 2011 (23rd) | "Frente a Frente" | Bunbury | |
| 2011 (23rd) | "Un Millón de Cicatrices" | El Canto del Loco | |
| 2012 (24th) | "Día de Suerte"‡ | Alejandra Guzmán | |
| 2012 (24th) | "Amor Clandestino" | Maná | |
| 2012 (24th) | "Lluvia al Corazón" | Maná | |
| 2012 (24th) | "Soñé" | Zoé | |
| 2012 (24th) | "Y No Regresas" | Juanes | |
| 2013 (25th) | "El Verdadero Amor Perdona"‡ | Maná featuring Prince Royce | |
| 2013 (25th) | "Hasta Que Te Conocí" | Maná | |
| 2013 (25th) | "La Señal" | Juanes | |
| 2013 (25th) | "Me Enamora" (MTV Unplugged version) | Juanes | |
| 2013 (25th) | "Quiero Creer" | Beto Cuevas featuring Flo Rida | |

== See also ==
- Latin Grammy Award for Best Rock Song
