= List of number-one Billboard Latin Pop Airplay songs of 2004 =

The most popular Latin pop songs in 2004, ranked by radio airplay audience impressions and measured by Nielsen BDS.

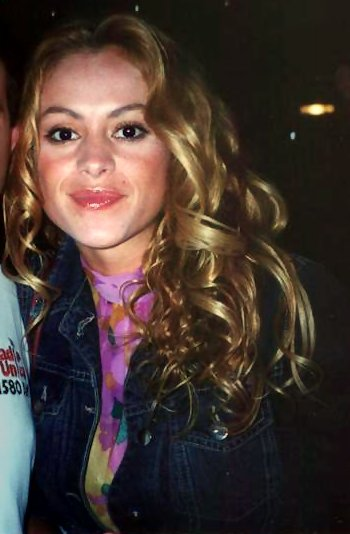
Singer Paulina Rubio reached the #1 position with the song "Te quise tanto" (Eng: I loved you very much), this hit spent 13 non-consecutive weeks at the peak position, becoming the 2nd longest-running for this year and it was the first time Paulina reached the #1 position in the airplay

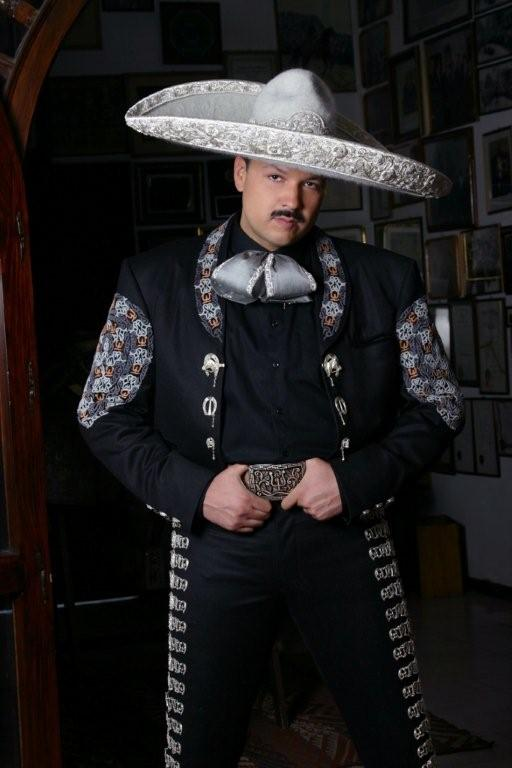
Singer Pepe Aguilar earned his first #1 song with the hit "Miedo" (Eng: Fear), this song spent just one week at the peak position.

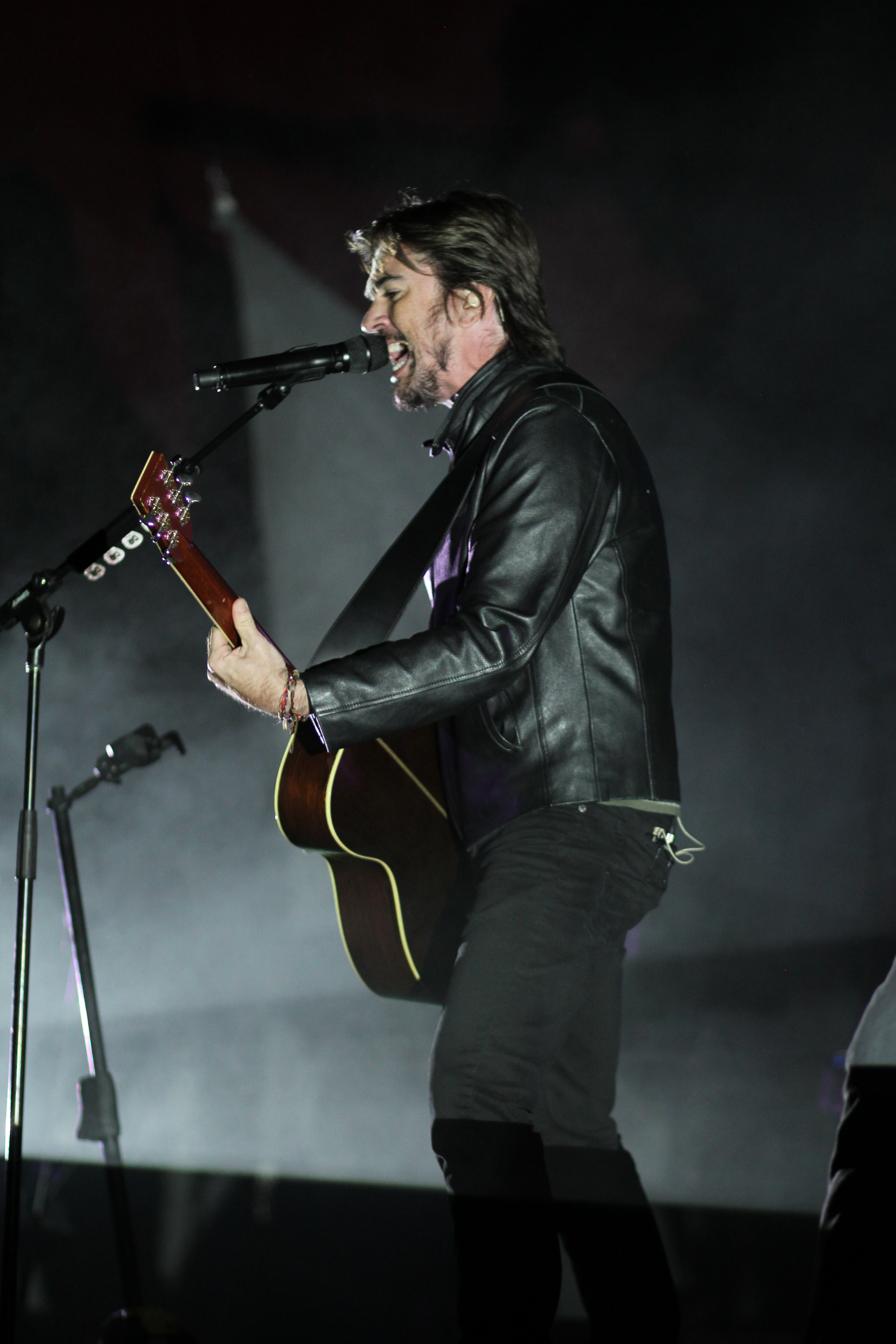
Singer Juanes reached the #1 position with his first release from the album "Mi Sangre" (Eng: My Blood), "Nada Valgo Sin Tu Amor" (Eng: I'm Worthless Without Your Love), spending in the privilege spot for 15 weeks, becoming the longest-running for this year.

| Issue date | Song | Artist(s) | Ref. |
|---|---|---|---|
| January 3 | "Mientes Tan Bien" | Sin Bandera | |
| January 10 | "Mientes Tan Bien" | Sin Bandera | |
| January 17 | "Mientes Tan Bien" | Sin Bandera | |
| January 24 | "Mientes Tan Bien" | Sin Bandera | |
| January 31 | "Cuidarte el alma" | Chayanne | |
| February 7 | "Cuidarte el alma" | Chayanne | |
| February 14 | "Cuidarte el alma" | Chayanne | |
| February 21 | "Te Quise Tanto" | Paulina Rubio | |
| February 28 | "Te Quise Tanto" | Paulina Rubio | |
| March 6 | "Te Quise Tanto" | Paulina Rubio | |
| March 13 | "Te Quise Tanto" | Paulina Rubio | |
| March 20 | "Te Quise Tanto" | Paulina Rubio | |
| March 27 | "Te Quise Tanto" | Paulina Rubio | |
| April 3 | "Te Quise Tanto" | Paulina Rubio | |
| April 10 | "Te Quise Tanto" | Paulina Rubio | |
| April 17 | "Fantasía o realidad" | Álex Ubago | |
| April 24 | "Te quise tanto" | Paulina Rubio | |
| May 1 | "Te quise tanto" | Paulina Rubio | |
| May 8 | "Te quise tanto" | Paulina Rubio | |
| May 15 | "Te quise tanto" | Paulina Rubio | |
| May 22 | "Te quise tanto" | Paulina Rubio | |
| May 29 | "Tú de que vas" | Franco De Vita | |
| June 5 | "Tú de que vas" | Franco De Vita | |
| June 12 | "Tú de que vas" | Franco De Vita | |
| June 19 | "Tú de que vas" | Franco De Vita | |
| June 26 | "Vivo y muero en tu piel" | Jennifer Peña | |
| July 3 | "Ahora quien" | Marc Anthony | |
| July 10 | "Ahora quien" | Marc Anthony | |
| July 17 | "Vivo y muero en tu piel" | Jennifer Peña | |
| July 24 | "Ahora quien" | Marc Anthony | |
| July 31 | "Duele el amor" | Aleks Syntek & Ana Torroja | |
| August 8 | "Duele el amor" | Aleks Syntek & Ana Torroja | |
| August 14 | "Duele el amor" | Aleks Syntek & Ana Torroja | |
| August 21 | "Duele el amor" | Aleks Syntek & Ana Torroja | |
| August 28 | "Algo Tienes" | Paulina Rubio | |
| September 4 | "Nada Valgo Sin Tu Amor" | Juanes | |
| September 11 | "Nada Valgo Sin Tu Amor" | Juanes | |
| September 18 | "Nada Valgo Sin Tu Amor" | Juanes | |
| September 25 | "Nada Valgo Sin Tu Amor" | Juanes | |
| October 2 | "Miedo" | Pepe Aguilar | |
| October 9 | "Nada Valgo Sin Tu Amor" | Juanes | |
| October 16 | "Nada Valgo Sin Tu Amor" | Juanes | |
| October 23 | "Nada Valgo Sin Tu Amor" | Juanes | |
| October 30 | "Nada Valgo Sin Tu Amor" | Juanes | |
| November 6 | "Nada Valgo Sin Tu Amor" | Juanes | |
| November 13 | "Nada Valgo Sin Tu Amor" | Juanes | |
| November 20 | "Nada Valgo Sin Tu Amor" | Juanes | |
| November 27 | "Nada Valgo Sin Tu Amor" | Juanes | |
| December 4 | "Nada Valgo Sin Tu Amor" | Juanes | |
| December 11 | "Nada Valgo Sin Tu Amor" | Juanes | |
| December 18 | "Nada Valgo Sin Tu Amor" | Juanes | |
| December 25 | "Dame Otro Tequila" | Paulina Rubio | |
