= Mi Sangre =

Studio album by Juanes
- Released: September 28, 2004
- Recorded: 2004
- Genres: Latin rock; Latin pop
- Length: 45:22
- Label: Surco
- Producers: David Heuer; Juanes; Aníbal Kerpel; Gustavo Santaolalla

Juanes chronology
Un Día Normal (2002)	Mi Sangre (2004)	La Vida... Es Un Ratico (2007)

Singles from Mi Sangre
- 1. "Nada Valgo Sin Tu Amor" Released: August 2004; 2. "Volverte a Ver" Released: November 2004; 3. "La Camisa Negra" Released: January 24, 2005; 4. "Para Tu Amor" Released: August 2005; 5. "Lo Que Me Gusta a Mí" Released: 2005; 6. "Rosario Tijeras" Released: December 12, 2005; 7. "No Siento Penas" Released: 2006

Professional ratings
Review scores
Source	Rating
AllMusic	3/5 stars

Mi Sangre (English: My Blood) is the third studio album by Colombian singer-songwriter Juanes, released on September 28, 2004.

== Re-releases ==
In 2005, a 'Tour Edition' of the album was released. This specially packaged re-release of Mi Sangre is an individually numbered, limited edition of 150,000 copies. Within its triple gatefold are two booklets — the CD's lyric book, a fold-out booklet with full credits of the current version, and many press quotes. The CD contains the regular album's 12 tracks, live versions of "A Dios le Pido," "La Camisa Negra," "Fotografía," and "Nada Valgo Sin Tu Amor". Bonus tracks include "La Paga", which features Taboo from The Black Eyed Peas, a remix of "La Camisa Negra," and the unreleased track "Lo Que Importa". "Lo Que Importa" was originally made for the album "Fijate Bien". The second disc is a DVD featuring all four videos shot for the album.

The 2005 Mexican double CD contains the regular album's 12 tracks too, but different bonus tracks and no DVD. Just like the regular Tour Edition, it contains bonus tracks "Lo Que Importa" and "La Paga", though the other bonus tracks are songs from his debut album Fíjate Bien; "Nada," "Fíjate Bien" and "Podemos Hacernos Daño". This edition also contains two other bonus tracks; an acoustic version of his first worldwide hit "A Dios le Pido" and a different remix of "La Camisa Negra."

As result of the big success after releasing "La Camisa Negra" at the end of 2005 and beginning of 2006, a Special European Tour edition was also released. The only difference between this version and the regular version is that the European version doesn't have the unreleased track "Lo Que Importa". The album also has a remix of "La Camisa Negra". In June 2006 a 2 disc limited edition was released in Germany. The first disc is the same as the Special European Tour edition. The second disc includes 6 songs performed live from the Shepherds Bush Empire in London.

The album was successful in the United States. As of 2019, the album has been certified 18× Platinum by the RIAA for selling 1,008,000 album-equivalent units in the country. In France, the album sold 300,000 copies as of 2014. Worldwide sales it estimated around 4 millions of copies.

== Track listing ==
=== Normal CD ===
1. "Ámame" (Love Me) – 4:19
2. "Para Tu Amor" (For Your Love) – 4:09
3. "Sueños" (Dreams) – 3:10
4. "La Camisa Negra" (The Black Shirt) – 3:36
5. "Nada Valgo Sin Tu Amor" (I'm Worthless Without Your Love) – 3:16
6. "No Siento Penas" (I Don't Have Regrets) – 3:53
7. "Dámelo" (Give It to Me) – 4:07
8. "Lo Que Me Gusta a Mí" (What I Like) – 3:30
9. "Rosario Tijeras" (Rosario Tijeras) – 3:27
10. "¿Qué Pasa?" (What's Happening?) – 3:47
11. "Volverte a Ver" (To See You Again) – 3:37
12. "Tu Guardián" (Your Guardian) – 4:25

=== Videoclips ===
1. "Para Tu Amor"
2. "La Camisa Negra"
3. "Nada Valgo Sin Tu Amor"
4. "Rosario Tijeras"
5. "Volverte a Ver"

=== Tour edition (2005) ===
#	Title	
Disc one (CD)
13.	"A Dios le Pido" [live]	4:08
14.	"La Camisa Negra" [live]	3:50
15.	"Fotografía" [live]	4:22
16.	"Nada Valgo Sin Tu Amor" [live]	3:58
17.	"La Paga" (featuring Taboo)	3:29
18.	"La Camisa Negra" [sonidero national remix]	4:35
19.	"Lo Que Importa" [unreleased track]	3:37
Disc two (DVD)
1.	"Nada Valgo Sin Tu Amor" [music video]	4:19
2.	"Volverte a Ver" [music video]	4:08
3.	"La Camisa Negra" [music video]	3:10
4.	Interview	3:36

=== Mexican 2CD (2005) ===
#	Title	
Disc one (CD)
Same as the normal CD
Disc two (CD)
1.	"La Paga" (featuring Taboo)	3:31
2.	"Nada"	3:53
3.	"Lo Que Importa"	3:37
4.	"Fíjate Bien"	4:53
5.	"A Dios le Pido" [acoustic version]	3:27
6.	"La Camisa Negra" [Toy Hernández remix]	4:34
7.	"Podemos Hacernos Daño"	3:44

=== European tour and Brazilian editions (2006) ===
#	Title	
Disc one (CD)
13.	"A Dios le Pido"	3:26
14.	"Es Por Ti"	4:12
15.	"Fotografía" (featuring Nelly Furtado)	4:00
16.	"La Paga" (featuring Taboo)	3:34
17.	"La Camisa Negra" [Full Phatt remix]	3:53

=== Limited edition [Germany] 2006 ===
#	Title	
Disc two (CD)
1.	"La Paga" (live)	4:17
2.	"Mala Gente" (live)	3:53
3.	"Fotografía" (live)	4:22
4.	"La Noche" (live)	3:53
5.	"La Camisa Negra" (live)	3:50
6.	"A Dios le Pido" (live)	4:53

== Charts ==
Weekly chart performance for Mi Sangre
Chart (2004–06)	Peak position
Argentine Albums (CAPIF)	5
Austrian Albums (Ö3 Austria)	2
Belgian Albums (Ultratop Flanders)	2
Belgian Albums (Ultratop Wallonia)	10
Danish Albums (Hitlisten)	3
Dominican Republic Albums (Musicalia)	2
Dutch Albums (Album Top 100)	4
Finnish Albums (Suomen virallinen lista)	1
French Albums (SNEP)	8
German Albums (Offizielle Top 100)	1
Hungarian Albums (MAHASZ)	4
Italian Albums (FIMI)	11
Norwegian Albums (VG-lista)	7
Portuguese Albums (AFP)	2
Spanish Albums (Promusicae)	2
Swedish Albums (Sverigetopplistan)	13
Swiss Albums (Schweizer Hitparade)	3
UK Albums (Official Charts)	91
US Billboard 200	33
US Top Latin Albums (Billboard)	1
US Latin Pop Albums (Billboard)	1

== Certifications and sales ==
Certifications and sales for Mi Sangre
Region	Certification	Certified units/sales
Argentina (CAPIF)	2× Platinum	80,000^{^}
Austria (IFPI Austria)	Gold	15,000^{*}
Belgium (BRMA)	Gold	25,000^{*}
Colombia	3× Platinum	200,000
Finland (Musiikkituottajat)	Platinum	51,811
Germany (BVMI)	2× Platinum	400,000^{^}
Greece (IFPI Greece)	Gold	10,000^{^}
Hungary (MAHASZ)	Gold	10,000^{^}
Mexico (AMPROFON)	2× Platinum	350,000
Netherlands (NVPI)	Gold	40,000^{^}
Portugal (AFP)	Platinum	40,000^{^}
Romania (UFPR)	Platinum	
Spain (Promusicae)	3× Platinum	400,000
Sweden (GLF)	Gold	30,000^{^}
Switzerland (IFPI Switzerland)	Platinum	40,000^{^}
United States (RIAA)	2× Diamond (Latin)	739,000
Summaries
Europe (IFPI)	Platinum	1,000,000^{*}
^{*} Sales figures based on certification alone.^{^} Shipments figures based on certification alone.

== Singles ==
Name	Released	Writer	Producer	Chart position
"Nada Valgo Sin Tu Amor"	August 31, 2004	Juanes	Juanes, Gustavo Santaolalla	#1 (US Hot Latin/US Latin Pop/), #7 (US Latin Tropical)
"Nada Valgo Sin Tu Amor" is a Latin rock song and the first single from Mi Sangre. At the 2005 Latin Grammy Awards, the song won the award for 'Best Rock Song'.
"Volverte a Ver"	2004	Juanes	Juanes, Gustavo Santaolalla	#1 (US Hot Latin/US Latin Pop), #4 (Slovakia), #15 (Hungary), #28 (Germany), #40 (Austria)
"Volverte a Ver" was released as the second single released from the album. The song got the award for 'Best Music Video' at the 2005 Latin Grammy Awards.
"La Camisa Negra"	July 24, 2005; 2006	Juanes	Juanes, Gustavo Santaolalla	#1 (AUT/BELG/DEN/EST/FRA/GER/HUNG/ITA/SLOV/SPA/SWI/TAI/US Hot Latin/US Latin Pop), #2 (NLD/RUS/US Latin Tropical), #5 (GRE), #6 (EU), #7 (FIN/POR), #9 (NOR/ROM), #13 (IRE), #27 (JAP/SWE), #32 (UK), #89 (US Hot 100)
"La Camisa Negra" ("The Black Shirt") is the third single from Mi Sangre, released in 2005 in Latin America. In Europe it was released as the official first single from Mi Sangre with a release date for every country, in 2005 and 2006. It became his biggest hit to date along with "A Dios le Pido," which was re-released in selected countries in Europe in 2006 due to the success of "La Camisa Negra." The song managed to peak in most European countries at the top position. Regardless of the fact the song is completely sung in Spanish, it even charted in the top 40 of the UK, peaking at number 32. Also in Ireland, the song has success in the summer of 2006. peaking at number 13. The song became the greatest hit in the chart history of Switzerland.
"Para Tu Amor"	November 2005; August 15, 2006	Juanes	Juanes, Gustavo Santaolalla	#3 (US Latin Pop), #10 (US Hot Latin), #15 (US Latin Tropical)
"Para Tu Amor" ("For Your Love") is the fourth single in Latin America and the official second single in Europe, released aside "A Dios le Pido" in selected countries. "Para Tu Amor" is a love ballad. In Latin America, the song was released in several countries only, while "Lo Que Me Gusta a Mí" was the fifth single released a month later in December 2005.
"Lo Que Me Gusta a Mí"	December 2005	Juanes	Juanes, Gustavo Santaolalla	#1 (US Latin Pop/US Latin Tropical), #2 (US Hot Latin), #94 (US Hot 100)
"Lo Que Me Gusta a Mí" ("What I Like)" is the fifth and last single in Latin America and was released a short while after preceding single "Para Tu Amor." It was more successful than its preceding single because it was more promoted than "Para Tu Amor." The song became the second Juanes song to chart in the American Billboard Hot 100

== Awards ==
- 2005 Latin Grammy Awards:

- Best Rock Song ("Nada Valgo Sin Tu Amor") – won
- Best Short Form Music Video ("Volverte a Ver") – won
- Rock Solo Vocal Album (Mi Sangre) – won

== See also ==
- 2004 in Latin music
- List of best-selling Latin albums
- List of best-selling Latin albums in the United States
- List of certified albums in Romania
