= Juntos (Together) =

Single by Juanes

from the album McFarland, USA
- Released: January 20, 2015
- Genre: Latin pop
- Length: 3:23
- Label: Walt Disney
- Songwriters: Juan Esteban Aristizabal; Martinez Descemer Bueno; Juan Fernando Fonseca Carrera
- Producer: Juan Luis Guerra

Juanes singles chronology
"Querida" (2015)	"Juntos (Together)" (2015)

"Juntos (Together)" is a song by Colombian singer-songwriter Juanes. It was written by Fonseca, Descemer Bueno and Juanes. The song was released digitally via the iTunes Store by Walt Disney Records and Universal Music Latin on 20 January 2015, as the lead single from the soundtrack for McFarland, USA. The song is a Latin pop song with alternative rock music influences and an instrumentation consisting of an electric guitar and synthesizer.

Upon its release, the song peaked at No. 14 on the US Billboard Hot Latin Songs and No. 1 and No. 9 in Colombian and Venezuela, respectively. The song's accompanying music video, was directed by Niki Caro. Juanes performed "Juntos" at the 57th Annual Grammy Awards on 8 February 2015.

== Background and release ==
On 24 November 2014, it was announced that Juanes would be recording a song called "Juntos" for the Walt Disney Pictures film McFarland, USA. In January 2015, Juanes' representatives announced that "Juntos" would be released on 20 January 2015. The song was written by Juanes, Fonseca, and Descemer Bueno and produced by Juan Luis Guerra.

On 20 January, "Juntos (Together)" was released digitally, and it was sent to US Latin contemporary hit radio stations. On the next day, the song was released in Latin America.

== Commercial performance ==
"Juntos (Together)" debuted at number 30 on the US Hot Latin Songs chart with sales between 3,000 copies for the week dated 25 January. According to Nielsen Music the song received 3.1 million audience impressions, taking "Juntos" the Greatest Gainer honors on US Latin Airplay chart. With the feat, it became Juanes' 26th entry on the chart. Additionally, it debuted at number 14 on the US Latin Pop Songs and number 39 on the US Tropical Songs.

In Colombia, the song debuted at number 3 at the National-Report, for the week dated 26 January. While in Venezuela debuted at number thirty.

== Music video ==
The accompanying music video for "Juntos (McFarland)" was directed by Niki Caro and shot in late December. It's an original motion picture soundtrack of McFarland, USA produced by Walt Disney Pictures. It was premiered on VEVO on 23 January 2015.

== Live performance ==
Juanes performed "Juntos" at the 57th Annual Grammy Awards held on 8 February 2015, at the Staples Center in Los Angeles.

== Track listing ==
- Digital download
1. "Juntos (Together) [From McFarland, USA]" - 3:20

== Charts ==
Chart (2015)	Peak position
Colombia (National-Report)	1
Dominican Republic Pop Chart (Monitor Latino)	14
Mexico (Billboard Mexican Airplay)	25
Mexico (Monitor Latino)	14
Spain (Promusicae)	62
US Hot Latin Songs (Billboard)	11
US Latin Airplay (Billboard)	1
US Latin Pop Airplay (Billboard)	1
US Tropical Airplay (Billboard)	4
Venezuela (Record Report)	2

== Release history ==
Country	Date	Format	Label	Ref.
Austria	1 January 2015	Digital download	Universal Music Latino	
France	1 January 2015	Digital download	Universal Music Latino	
Germany	1 January 2015	Digital download	Universal Music Latino	
Italy	1 January 2015	Digital download	Universal Music Latino	
Spain	1 January 2015	Digital download	Universal Music Latino	
United States	20 January 2015	Digital download	Universal Music Latino	
Colombia	21 January 2015	Digital download	Universal Music Latino	
Mexico	21 January 2015	Digital download	Universal Music Latino	

== See also ==
- List of Billboard number-one Latin songs of 2015
