= Para Tu Amor =

Single by Juanes

from the album Mi Sangre
- Released: August 8, 2005
- Genre: Soft rock
- Length: 4:08
- Label: Universal Music Latino
- Songwriter: Juanes
- Producer: Gustavo Santaolalla

Juanes singles chronology
| "La Camisa Negra" (2005) | "Para Tu Amor" (2005) | "Lo Que Me Gusta a Mí" (2006) |

Music video
- "Para Tu Amor" on YouTube

"Para Tu Amor" (For Your Love) is a song written and performed by Colombian singer-songwriter Juanes. The song is the follow-up radio single to his break-through hit single "La Camisa Negra", from his studio album, Mi Sangre.

== Track listing ==
1. "Para Tu Amor" – 4:08 (Juan Esteban Aristizabal)

== Charts ==
| Chart (2006) | Peak position |
|---|---|
| Netherlands (Single Top 100) | 36 |
| US Hot Latin Songs (Billboard) | 10 |
| US Latin Pop Airplay (Billboard) | 3 |

=== Year-end charts ===
| Chart (2007) | Position |
|---|---|
| Brazil (Crowley) | 51 |

== Certifications ==
| Region | Certification | Certified units/sales |
|---|---|---|
| Brazil (Pro-Música Brasil) | Gold | 30,000^{*} |
^{*} Sales figures based on certification alone.
