= A Dios le Pido =

Single by Juanes

from the album Un Día Normal
- Released: 25 March 2002
- Recorded: 2002
- Genre: Alternative rock; Latin rock
- Length: 3:25
- Label: Surco
- Songwriter: Juanes
- Producers: Juan Esteban Aristizábal; Gustavo Santaolalla

Juanes singles chronology
"Nada" (2001)	"A Dios le Pido" (2002)	"Es Por Ti" (2002)

"A Dios le Pido" ("I Beg to God") is the lead single from the Spanish studio album Un Día Normal by the Latin music singer and songwriter Juanes, released in 2002 in Spain and Latin America. In 2006, the song was re-released in some countries in Europe, right after the success of "La Camisa Negra", which charted in almost every European country in the top five. It reached number one in twelve countries on three different continents. "A Dios le Pido" spent 47 consecutive weeks on the Billboard Hot Latin Tracks reaching number two (kept out from the number one spot by Chayanne's "Y Tú Te Vas" and Jennifer Peña's "El Dolor de Tu Presencia").

This track won the Latin Grammy Award for Best Rock Song at the Latin Grammy Awards of 2002, the second year in a row for the singer.

The song is an anthem asking God to bless and protect the singer's family, future children, and close friends. It quickly became a hymn for peace through all of Latin America, particularly because of the line "a Dios le pido que mi pueblo no derrame tanta sangre y se levante mi gente", – ("I ask God: may my country not shed so much blood and may my people rise up").

== Track listings ==
Digital download (Surco/1 September 2003)

1. "A Dios le Pido" – 3:27
2. "A Dios le Pido" [acoustic version] – 3:30
3. "Fijate bien" [original version] – 4:50
4. "Nada" [acoustic version] – 3:55

Mexican CD single (Universal/2002)

1. "A Dios le Pido" [original version] – 3:26
2. "A Dios le Pido" [acoustic version] – 3:28

EU CD single (Surco/8 September 2003)

1. "A Dios le Pido" [original version] – 3:26
2. "A Dios le Pido" [acoustic version] – 3:28

EU CD single (Universal/7 April 2006)

1. "A Dios le Pido" [album version] – 3:25
2. "A Dios le Pido" [Full Phatt remix] – 3:40

French CD single (Universal/3 April 2006)

1. "A Dios le Pido" – 3:25
2. "La Camisa Negra" – 3:34

EU maxi single (Universal/7 April 2006)

1. "A Dios le Pido" [album version] – 3:25
2. "A Dios le Pido" [Full Phatt remix] – 3:40
3. "Un Día Normal" [album version] – 3:53

== Charts ==
=== Weekly charts ===
Chart (2002–06)	Peak position
Austria (Ö3 Austria Top 40)	19
Belgium (Ultratop 50 Flanders)	33
Belgium (Ultratop 50 Wallonia)	19
CIS Airplay (TopHit)	5
Czech Republic Airplay (ČNS IFPI)	22
European Hot 100 Singles (Billboard)	41
France (SNEP)	12
Germany (GfK)	31
Hungary (Rádiós Top 40)	1
Mexico Pop (Monitor Latino)	7
Netherlands (Dutch Top 40)	18
Netherlands (Single Top 100)	15
New Zealand (Recorded Music NZ)	15
Romania (Romanian Top 100)	3
Russia Airplay (TopHit)	2
Slovakia Airplay (ČNS IFPI)	16
Switzerland (Schweizer Hitparade)	7
Spain (Promusicae)	6
US Bubbling Under Hot 100 (Billboard)	19
US Hot Latin Songs (Billboard)	2
US Tropical Songs (Billboard)	1

=== Year-end charts ===
Chart (2003)	Position
Netherlands (Dutch Top 40)	79
Netherlands (Single Top 100)	67

Chart (2006)	Position
Austria (Ö3 Austria Top 40)	68
Belgium (Ultratop Wallonia)	68
CIS (Tophit)	22
Hungary (Rádiós Top 40)	8
Russia Airplay (TopHit)	16
Switzerland (Schweizer Hitparade)	27

=== Decade-end charts ===
Decade-end chart performance for "A Dios le Pido"
Chart (2000–2009)	Position
Russia Airplay (TopHit)	112

== Certifications ==
Region	Certification	Certified units/sales
United States (RIAA)	12× Platinum (Latin)	720,000^{‡}
^{‡} Sales+streaming figures based on certification alone.
