= Obie Bermúdez =

R&B/salsa singer and composer

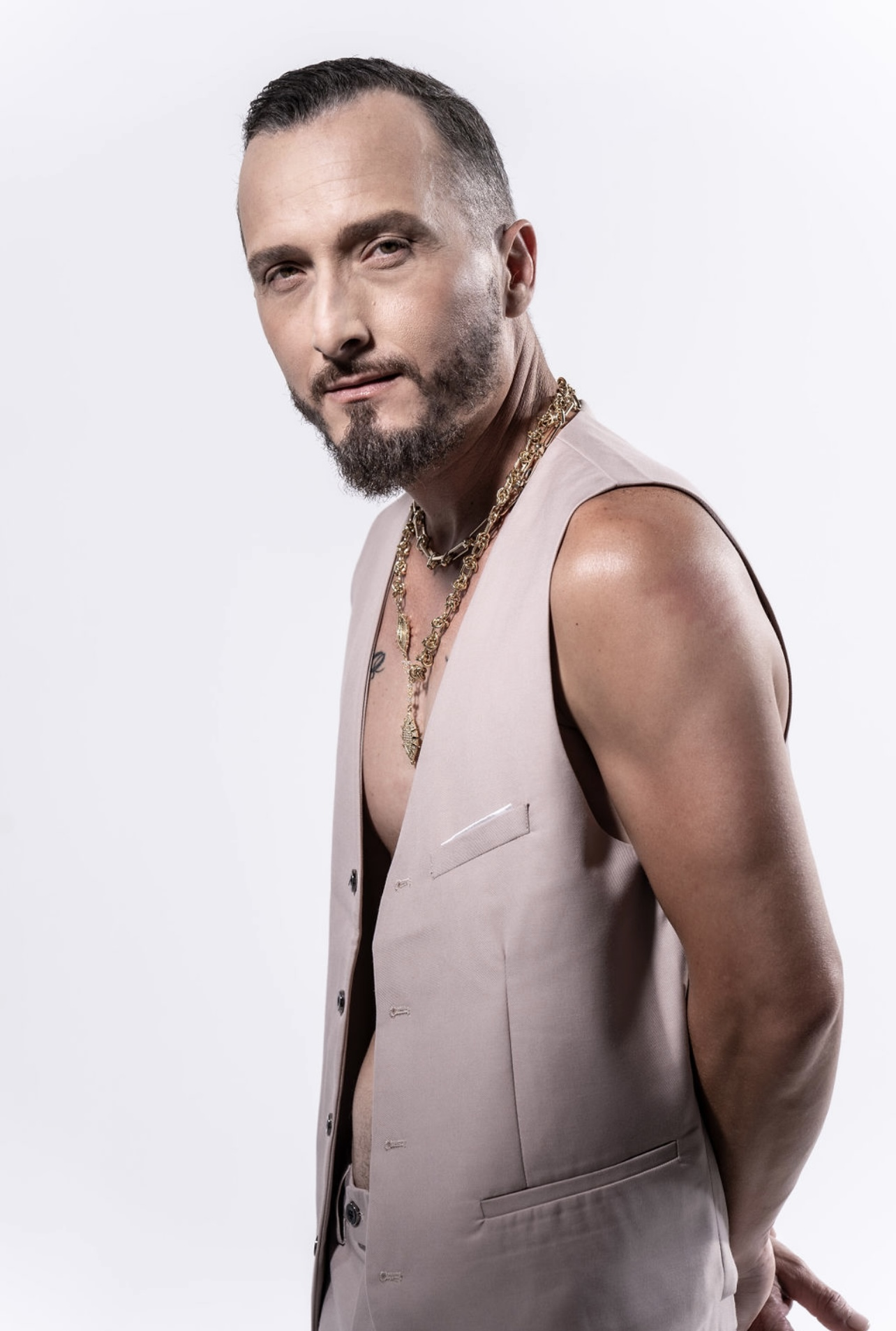
- Obie Bermúdez in 2024

Background information
- Born: January 10, 1981 (age 45); Aibonito, Puerto Rico
- Genres: Latin pop; salsa
- Occupation: Singer/Songwriter
- Instrument: Vocals
- Years active: 1996–present
- Labels: BMG; EMI

Obie Bermúdez (born January 10, 1981) is a Puerto Rican Latin pop, salsa singer and composer.

Born in Puerto Rico and raised in New Jersey, his music is deeply influenced by his roots in both communities, infusing elements of salsa, pop, and rock. His songs have earned multiple accolades, including a Grammy Award.

His music has also been featured in television and film, including a season on Telemundo’s “Asi Se Baila” and Spanish-language movies “Al Revés”, “La Última Gira”, and “El Cantante”.

Beyond his success as a solo artist and songwriter, Bermúdez has also collaborated with other renowned musicians. In addition to his musical achievements, he is also actively involved in philanthropy, using his platform to support various charitable causes such as Autism Awareness and disability rights advocacy.

== Early years ==
Bermúdez was born in Aibonito, Puerto Rico, where he received his primary education. His father and grandfather were both musicians. In 1992, the family moved to Vineland, New Jersey where he received his secondary education at Vineland High School, graduating in 1995. Bermúdez is bilingual and speaks English and Spanish fluently. In 1996, he recorded his first demo.

== Career as a singer ==
In 1998, Bermúdez recorded his first CD and debuted as a professional singer with Locales (Locals). Locales was recorded by BMG Records.

In 2000, Bermúdez moved to New York City, where he temporarily worked in a laundromat to sustain himself economically. While working at the laundromat, he came into contact with all sorts of people from different levels of society. The experiences that he gained by observing and coming into contact with these people would serve him in the near future with his song writing.

In 2003, he was contracted to participate in the United States musical tours of Juanes, Paulina Rubio and Juan Luis Guerra. In 2004, Bermúdez released his second CD Confesiones, which contained three songs which reached the Top 10 singles on Billboard's Hot Latin Charts.

In January 2005 he released Todo el Año (All year long) which included the songs Maldita Boca (Damn mouth) and Ya te Olvide (I have forgotten you). The album won a Latin Grammy for Best Male Pop Vocal Album. He also released Como Pudiste (How could you?).

== Later years ==
Bermúdez returned with the August 29, 2006, release of his fourth album, "Lo Que Trajo El Barco" (What The Ship Has Brought In). The album represents the follow-up to Todo El Año. In 2009, Bermúdez together with Danny Rivera, Ray de la Paz, and Claudette Sierra, participated in the recording of Songs of the Capeman, based on Paul Simon's play The Capeman (a Broadway musical about the life of Salvador Agron) under the direction of Oscar Hernández and his Spanish Harlem Orquestra.

He was previously married to Latin Popstar Jennifer Peña, from Corpus Christi, Texas. The two announced their separation in 2023.

== Discography ==
=== Albums ===
- Locales (1998)
- Confesiones (2003)
- Todo el Año (2004)
- Lo Que Trajo el Barco (2006)
- Sólo Éxitos (2007)
- #Cambios (2016)

=== Singles ===
- Pa' Que Volver
- Antes
- Maldita Boca
- Ya te olvide
- Como Pudiste
- Si Fuera Facil
- Todo El Año
- Preso en Mi Propia Piel
- 4:00 Am
- Sigo con ella

== See also ==
- List of Puerto Ricans
