= Todo el Año =

Studio album by Obie Bermúdez
- Released: November 2, 2004
- Genre: Latin pop
- Label: EMI
- Producer: Sebastian Krys, Joel Someillan

Obie Bermúdez chronology
Confesiones (2003)	Todo el Año (2004)	Lo Que Trajo el Barco (2006)

Todo el Año (All Year Long) is the third studio album released by Puerto-Rican American performer Obie Bermúdez. It was released by EMI on November 2, 2004. The album was produced by Sebastian Krys and Joel Someillan and earned Bermúdez a Latin Grammy Award for Best Male Pop Vocal Album and garnered a nomination for Album of the Year.

== Track listing ==
This information was adapted from Allmusic.

No.	Title	Writer(s)	Length
1.	"Celos"	Obie Bermúdez, Mikey Perfecto	3:42
2.	"Como Decirle"	Bermúdez, Jerry Ramos	3:41
3.	"Todo el Año"	Bermúdez, Elsten Torres	4:00
4.	"Maldita Boca"	Bermúdez	3:34
5.	"No Se Nada de Tí"	Bermúdez	3:44
6.	"Chapulín"	Bermúdez, Roberto Gómez Bolaños	4:11
7.	"Como Pudiste"	Bermúdez, Juan Carlos Pérez Solo	3:54
8.	"Sabes Bien"	Bermúdez	3:37
9.	"El Recuerdo"	Bermúdez, Gian Marco Zignago	3:52
10.	"Ya Te Olvidé"	Bermúdez	4:27
11.	"Dos Locos"	Bermúdez	3:40

== Chart performance ==
Chart (2004)	Peak position
US Billboard Top Latin Albums	38
US Billboard Latin Pop Albums	7
