= Lo Que Me Gusta a Mí =

Single by Juanes

from the album Mi Sangre
- Released: 2006
- Recorded: 2004
- Genre: Latin pop
- Length: 3:30
- Label: Universal Music Latino
- Songwriter(s): Juanes
- Producer(s): Gustavo Santaolalla

Juanes singles chronology
"Para Tu Amor" (2006)	"Lo Que Me Gusta a Mí" (2006)	"Rosario Tijeras" (2006)

"Lo Que Me Gusta a Mí" (English: "What I Like") is a song written and performed by Colombian singer-songwriter Juanes. The song is the fifth of six radio singles released in promotional of his studio album, Mi Sangre.

== Track listing ==
1. "Lo Que Me Gusta a Mí" – 3:30 (Juan Esteban Aristizabal)

== Charts ==
=== Weekly charts ===
Chart (2006)	Peak position
US Billboard Hot 100	94
US Hot Latin Songs (Billboard)	2
US Tropical Airplay (Billboard)	1

=== Year-end charts ===
Chart (2006)	Position
US Hot Latin Songs (Billboard)	15
