= Volverte a Ver =

Single by Juanes

from the album Mi Sangre
- Released: 2004
- Recorded: 2004
- Genre: Latin pop; alternative rock
- Length: 3:37
- Label: Universal Music Latino
- Songwriter: Juanes
- Producer: Gustavo Santaolalla

Juanes singles chronology
"Nada Valgo Sin Tu Amor" (2004)	"Volverte a Ver" (2004)	"La Camisa Negra" (2005)

"Volverte a Ver" (English: "See You Again") is a song written and performed by Colombian singer-songwriter Juanes. The song is the second radio single (after "Nada Valgo Sin Tu Amor") from his third studio album, Mi Sangre. The video for the single, directed by Gustavo Garzón won the Latin Grammy Award for Best Short Form Music Video at the Latin Grammy Awards of 2005.

== Track listing ==
1. "Volverte a Ver" – 3:37 (Juan Esteban Aristizabal)

== Chart performance ==
Chart (2005–2006)	Peak position
Austria (Ö3 Austria Top 40)	40
Colombia (ASINCOL)	5
CIS Airplay (TopHit)	119
European Hot 100 Singles (Billboard)	94
Germany (GfK)	28
Guatemala (Notimex)	3
Hungary (Rádiós Top 40)	15
Panama (Notimex)	3
Paraguay (Notimex)	3
Peru (Notimex)	1
US Bubbling Under Hot 100 (Billboard)	6
US Hot Latin Songs (Billboard)	1
US Latin Pop Airplay (Billboard)	1
Venezuela (Notimex)	1
