= Nada Valgo Sin Tu Amor =

Single by Juanes

from the album Mi Sangre
- Released: July 2004
- Genre: Alternative rock; rock en español
- Length: 3:16
- Label: Universal; Surco
- Songwriter: Juanes

Juanes singles chronology
"Un Dia Normal" (2002)	"Nada Valgo Sin Tu Amor" (2004)	"Volverte a Ver" (2004)

"Nada Valgo Sin Tu Amor" (English: "I'm Worthless Without Your Love") is a song by Colombian singer-songwriter Juanes from his album Mi Sangre. At the 2005 Latin Grammy Awards, the song won Best Rock Song and the inaugural Lo Nuestro Award for Rock/Alternative Song of the Year.

== Track listing ==
1. "Nada Valgo Sin Tu Amor" – 3:16 (Juanes)

== Chart performance ==
Chart (2004)	Peak position
US Bubbling Under Hot 100 (Billboard)	4
US Hot Latin Songs (Billboard)	1
US Latin Pop Airplay (Billboard)	1
