= La Camisa Negra =

2005 single by Juanes

Single by Juanes

from the album Mi Sangre
- Released: 24 January 2005
- Genre: Cumbia; alternative rock; Latin pop
- Length: 3:36
- Label: Surco; Universal Latino
- Songwriters: Juanes; Octavio Mesa
- Producers: Juanes; Gustavo Santaolalla

Juanes singles chronology
| "Volverte a Ver" (2004) | "La Camisa Negra" (2005) | "Para Tu Amor" (2005) |

Music video
- "La Camisa Negra" on YouTube

"La Camisa Negra" (transl. "The Black Shirt") is a Spanish rock song written by Juanes, inspired by Colombian singer-songwriter Octavio Mesa and recorded by Juanes for his third studio album Mi Sangre. In Latin America, the track was released in 2005 as the third single from Mi Sangre, and in Europe, it was released in 2006 as the album's lead single.

The song received mixed reviews from critics and generated controversy when it was adopted by neo-fascists in Italy. Juanes repudiated the misappropriation of his song for political purposes. The single was successful in Europe, topping several record charts. It was the summer hit of 2005 in Spain.

== Music and structure ==
"La Camisa Negra"
The song's lyrics describe a lost love.

"La Camisa Negra" is written in common time in the key of F♯ minor. The song is carried by a heavy bass guitar and an acoustic guitar strum at a moderate 100 beats per minute, with an accompanying melody on the electric guitar. The lyrics are organized in the common verse-chorus form, and Juanes's range spans around an octave and a half, from C♯_{3} to F♯_{4}.

=== Lyrics ===
The lyrics implies that the singer is bitterly wearing La Camisa Negra, the black shirt, as a way of mourning a failed love affair or even his own death, presumably singing to the object of his love. Some lyrics have double meanings or use enjambment to suggest more off-color phrases: Several sentences seem ready to end with an obscenity, before gliding into a new sentence that begins with a similar but non-obscene word. The sad lyrics are dissonant with the cheerful melody.

== Critical reception ==
The song received mixed reviews from critics. Contactmusic.com stated that the track "is a good intro into the world of Juanes as it fully exhibits his guitar style and absorbing voice." MyVillage gave the song two out of five stars, commenting that it "has a certain charm about it, but I certainly won't mind missing the boat on this occasion." IndieLondon called the song "a supremely slick acoustic ballad", stating that "the rolling guitar licks…provide a wonderful accompaniment." OMH gave the song a mixed review, stating that "the powerful chorus has a rather catchy vocal melody to it" but that "it's like being promised a culinary banquet only to be served a few chicken nuggets."

== Controversy ==
The song was adopted by neo-fascists in Italy because of the association of "black shirt" with the Fascist Blackshirts of Benito Mussolini, and many nightclub attendees from the far right raised an arm in the fascist salute when the song was played. In response, left-wing media network Indymedia called for a boycott of the song. Juanes later stated that "'La Camisa Negra' has got nothing to do with fascism or Mussolini...People can interpret music in all kinds of ways I guess." The song was also banned in the Dominican Republic for its sexual undertones. It was also implicated in controversy at his August 2009 performance in Havana.

== Chart performance ==
In the United States, the song performed quite well for a Spanish language recording reaching number eighty-nine on the Billboard Hot 100. It performed much better on the Latin charts, topping the Hot Latin Tracks for eight non-consecutive weeks, topping the Latin Pop Airplay, and reaching number two on the Latin Tropical Airplay. Billboard listed the song at number two on the 2005 year-end Hot Latin Songs chart, behind fellow Colombian singer-songwriter Shakira's "La Tortura". The song performed well in Europe, topping the charts in Austria, Denmark, France, Germany, Italy, Spain, and Switzerland and reaching the top twenty in Belgium, Finland, Ireland, the Netherlands, and Norway. The single was certified gold in Switzerland and it is one of the Top 10 singles in the country's history. As of August 2014, it is the 51st best-selling single of the 21st century in France, with 395,000 units sold.

== Music video ==
A music video for the song was released in 2005. In the video, Juanes arrives in a town, accompanied by two women (played by Colombian actresses Natalia Duran and Norma Nivia) and an older man. The man and women exit the car, and the man begins playing a guitar while the two dance. Various people are shown in realist street scenes. A wave comes out of the guitar, and aside from Juanes, everyone through whom the wave passes is frozen in time, performing the same motion repeatedly in forward and reverse. During the last chorus, the wave reverses direction, and the people of the town disappear. The waves emitted by the guitar are sucked back in to the guitar. The identity of the women and the old man, and their motives remain unexplained.

== Formats and track listings ==
12-inch maxi single (House remixes)

1. "La Camisa Negra" [main mix]
2. "La Camisa Negra" [Duro mix]
3. "La Camisa Negra" [T.U.&G! remix]

CD single 1

1. "La Camisa Negra" [album version] – 3:36
2. "La Camisa Negra" [remix por Toy Hernández] – 4:36

CD single 2

1. "La Camisa Negra" [album version] – 3:36
2. "La Camisa Negra" [Sonidero Nacional remix] – 3:36

Maxi single

1. "La Camisa Negra" [album version] – 3:36
2. "La Camisa Negra" [Sonidero Nacional remix] – 3:36
3. "Fotografía" [featuring Nelly Furtado] – 3:58
4. "La Camisa Negra" [video] [bonus]
5. An Introduction to Juanes [bonus]

== Charts ==
=== Weekly charts ===
2005–2008 weekly chart performance for "La Camisa Negra"
| Chart (2005–2008) | Peak position |
|---|---|
| Austria (Ö3 Austria Top 40) | 1 |
| Belgium (Ultratop 50 Flanders) | 3 |
| Belgium (Ultratop 50 Wallonia) | 1 |
| CIS Airplay (TopHit) | 3 |
| Czech Republic Airplay (ČNS IFPI) | 1 |
| Europe (Eurochart Hot 100) | 4 |
| Finland (Suomen virallinen lista) | 7 |
| France (SNEP) | 1 |
| Germany (GfK) | 1 |
| Hungary (Dance Top 40) | 1 |
| Hungary (Rádiós Top 40) | 1 |
| Italy (FIMI) | 1 |
| Netherlands (Dutch Top 40) | 2 |
| Netherlands (Single Top 100) | 3 |
| Nicaragua (Notimex) | 3 |
| Norway (VG-lista) | 9 |
| Russia Airplay (TopHit) | 2 |
| Slovakia Airplay (ČNS IFPI) | 79 |
| Sweden (Sverigetopplistan) | 27 |
| Switzerland (Schweizer Hitparade) | 1 |
| Ukraine Airplay (TopHit) | 67 |
| UK Singles (Official Charts) | 32 |
| US Billboard Hot 100 | 89 |
| US Hot Latin Songs (Billboard) | 1 |
| US Latin Pop Airplay (Billboard) | 1 |
| US Regional Mexican Songs (Billboard) | 1 |
| US Tropical Songs (Billboard) | 1 |
| Venezuela (Notimex) | 3 |

2015–2017 weekly chart performance for "La Camisa Negra"
| Chart (2015–2017) | Peak position |
|---|---|
| Poland Airplay (ZPAV) | 65 |
| Ukraine Airplay (TopHit) | 77 |

2023–2025 weekly chart performance for "La Camisa Negra"
| Chart (2023–2025) | Peak position |
|---|---|
| Kazakhstan Airplay (TopHit) | 64 |
| Moldova Airplay (TopHit) | 76 |
| Romania Airplay (TopHit) | 134 |
| Russia Streaming (TopHit) | 100 |
| Ukraine Airplay (TopHit) | 177 |

=== Monthly charts ===
2006 monthly chart performance for "La Camisa Negra"
| Chart (2006) | Peak position |
|---|---|
| CIS Airplay (TopHit) | 4 |
| Czech Republic (Rádio Top 100) | 1 |
| Russia Airplay (TopHit) | 3 |

2011 monthly chart performance for "La Camisa Negra"
| Chart (2011) | Peak position |
|---|---|
| Ukraine Airplay (TopHit) | 79 |

2024 monthly chart performance for "La Camisa Negra"
| Chart (2024) | Peak position |
|---|---|
| Kazakhstan Airplay (TopHit) | 85 |

2025 monthly chart performance for "La Camisa Negra"
| Chart (2025) | Peak position |
|---|---|
| Russia Streaming (TopHit) | 92 |

=== Year-end charts ===
2005 year-end chart performance for "La Camisa Negra"
| Chart (2005) | Position |
|---|---|
| Austria (Ö3 Austria Top 40) | 10 |
| CIS Airplay (TopHit) | 39 |
| Europe (Eurochart Hot 100) | 25 |
| France (SNEP) | 23 |
| Germany (Media Control GfK) | 6 |
| Hungary (Rádiós Top 40) | 96 |
| Russia Airplay (TopHit) | 34 |
| Switzerland (Schweizer Hitparade) | 7 |

2006 year-end chart performance for "La Camisa Negra"
| Chart (2006) | Position |
|---|---|
| Belgium (Ultratop 50 Flanders) | 7 |
| Belgium (Ultratop 50 Wallonia) | 5 |
| CIS Airplay (TopHit) | 15 |
| Europe (Eurochart Hot 100) | 10 |
| France (SNEP) | 24 |
| Hungary (Dance Top 40) | 11 |
| Hungary (Rádiós Top 40) | 1 |
| Netherlands (Dutch Top 40) | 1 |
| Netherlands (Single Top 100) | 4 |
| Russia Airplay (TopHit) | 13 |
| Switzerland (Schweizer Hitparade) | 37 |

2010 year-end chart performance for "La Camisa Negra"
| Chart (2010) | Position |
|---|---|
| Ukraine Airplay (TopHit) | 182 |

2011 year-end chart performance for "La Camisa Negra"
| Chart (2011) | Position |
|---|---|
| Ukraine Airplay (TopHit) | 109 |

2024 year-end chart performance for "La Camisa Negra"
| Chart (2024) | Position |
|---|---|
| Kazakhstan Airplay (TopHit) | 89 |

=== Decade-end charts ===
Decade-end chart performance for "La Camisa Negra"
| Chart (2000–2009) | Position |
|---|---|
| CIS Airplay (TopHit) | 23 |
| Russia Airplay (TopHit) | 22 |

=== All-time charts ===
All-time chart performance for "La Camisa Negra"
| Chart (2021) | Position |
|---|---|
| US Hot Latin Songs (Billboard) | 40 |

== Certifications ==
Certifications and sales for "La Camisa Negra"
| Region | Certification | Certified units/sales |
|---|---|---|
| Belgium (BRMA) | Gold | 25,000^{*} |
| Denmark (IFPI Danmark) | Platinum | 8,000^{^} |
| Germany (BVMI) | Gold | 150,000^{^} |
| Italy (FIMI) | Gold | 50,000^{‡} |
| Spain (Promusicae) | Platinum | 60,000^{‡} |
| Sweden (GLF) | Gold | 10,000^{^} |
| Switzerland (IFPI Switzerland) | Gold | 20,000^{^} |
| United States (RIAA) | Gold | 500,000^{‡} |
^{*} Sales figures based on certification alone.^{^} Shipments figures based on certification alone.^{‡} Sales+streaming figures based on certification alone.
