= 24th Annual Latin Grammy Awards =

2023 edition of the Latin Grammy Awards

24th Latin Grammy Awards
- Date: November 16, 2023
- Venue: FIBES Conference and Exhibition Centre; Seville; Andalusia, Spain
- Hosted by: Sebastián Yatra; Danna Paola; Roselyn Sánchez; Paz Vega

Highlights
- Most awards: Karol G, Shakira, Natalia Lafourcade, Bizarrap, Edgar Barrera, Santiago Alvarado (3 each)
- Most nominations: Edgar Barrera (13)
- Person of the Year: Laura Pausini

Television/radio coverage
- Network: Univision; La 1 HBO Max
- Viewership: 18.9 million

The 24th Annual Latin Grammy Awards took place on November 16, 2023, at the FIBES Conference and Exhibition Centre in Seville, Spain. The awards honored recordings released between June 1, 2022, and May 31, 2023. It marked the first time that the awards were held outside of the United States. The ceremony was hosted by Colombian singer Sebastián Yatra, Mexican singer Danna Paola, Puerto Rican actress Roselyn Sánchez, and Spanish actress Paz Vega.

The nominations were announced via a virtual livestream on September 20, 2023, presented by Yandel, Tainy, Victor Manuelle, Angela Alvarez, Ana Caetano, Pablo Novaes, Mon Laferte, Christian Nodal, C. Tangana, Liniker, Fito Páez, Fonseca, Ludmilla, Shakira, Jorge Drexler, and Rosalía. Mexican-American producer and songwriter Edgar Barrera led the nominations with thirteen, followed by Camilo, Karol G, Shakira, and Kevyn Mauricio Cruz, all with seven nominations. Shakira became the first artist to receive three nominations for Song of the Year in the same year with "Shakira: Bzrp Music Sessions, Vol. 53", "TQG", and "Acróstico".

Laura Pausini was honored as the Latin Recording Academy Person of the Year prior to the ceremony, making her the first artist of non Iberian/Ibero-American heritage to receive the honor. Musicians and singers Carmen Linares, Manuel Mijares, Arturo Sandoval, Simone, Soda Stereo and Ana Torroja were honoured with the Latin Grammy Lifetime Achievement Award while Peruvian drummer Alex Acuña, Argentinian composer Gustavo Santaolalla and Puerto Rican music director Wisón Torres were this year's recipients for the Latin Grammy Trustees Award.

== Performances ==
List of musical performances
Artist(s)	Song(s)
Premiere ceremony
Israel Fernández; Niña Pastori; Juanfe Pérez; Diego Guerrero; Omar Montes	"Despierta" "Y de Repente" "Por la Tangente" "La Llama del Amor"
Julieta Venegas	"Tu Historia"
Majo Aguilar	"Quiero un Amor"
Mike Bahía	"De Qué Manera"
Vanesa Martín; Paula Arenas; Elena Rose	"Marzo" "Déjame Llorarte" "Bayamón"
Thiaguinho	"Vencedor"
Main ceremony
Rosalía	"Se Nos Rompió el Amor"
Ozuna; David Guetta	"Hey Mor" "Location"
Carin León	"Primera Cita"
Alejandro Sanz	"Corazón Partío"
Juanes; Joaquina; Borja; Leon Leiden; Natascha Falcão; Paola Guanche; Gale	"Gris"
Sebastián Yatra	"Energía Bacana" "Vagabundo"
Shakira	"Acróstico"
Eslabón Armado; Peso Pluma	"Ella Baila Sola"
Laura Pausini	"Durar" "La Soledad" "Víveme" "En Cambio No"
Rauw Alejandro	"Se Fue" "No Me Sueltes" "Baby Hello"
Andrea Bocelli	"Granada"
Maluma; Carín León	"Según Quién" "Procura" "La Fórmula"
Bizarrap; Shakira; Milo J Agarrate Catalina; Quinteto Ástor Piazzolla; Ariel Ardit	"Milo J: Bzrp Music Sessions, Vol. 57" "Quevedo: Bzrp Music Sessions, Vol. 52" "Shakira: Bzrp Music Sessions, Vol. 53"
María Becerra; Pablo Alborán	"Amigos" "Ojalá"
Camilo; Edgar Barrera; Iza; Manuel Carrasco	"Salitre" "Pegao"
Christian Nodal; Kany García	"La Siguiente"
Feid; DJ Premier	"Prohibidox" "Le Pido a Dios"

== Presenters ==
Premiere ceremony

- Miguel Ángel Muñoz – host
- Giulia Be – host
- Rachel Reis
- Lasso
- Monsieur Periné
- Dante Spinetta
- Chucho Rincón
- Fabián Rincón
- Roxana Amed
- Criolo
- Ana del Castillo
- Simone
- Ana Torroja

Main ceremony

- Pedro Capó and Natalia Lafourcade – presented Best Pop Song
- Carlos Ponce and Luis Figueroa – presented Best Tropical Song
- Fonseca and Majo Aguilar – presented Best Norteño Album
- David Bisbal and Paz Vega – presented Best Flamenco Album
- Nicki Nicole and Tiago Iorc – presented Best Pop Vocal Album
- John Leguizamo and Yandel – presented Best Urban Music Album
- Carlos Vives – presented Best New Artist
- Mon Laferte and Sergio Ramos – presented Song of the Year
- Jorge Drexler and Julieta Venegas – presented Record of the Year
- Anitta and Luis Fonsi – presented Album of the Year

== Winners and nominees ==
The nominations were announced on September 19. Winners are bolded.

=== General ===
Record of the Year

- **"De Todas las Flores" – Natalia Lafourcade**
  - **Adan Jodorowsky & Natalia Lafourcade, record producers; Gerardo Ordoñez, recording engineer; Gerardo Ordoñez, mixer; Bernie Grundman, mastering engineer**
- "No Es Que Te Extrañe" – Christina Aguilera
  - Rafa Arcaute, Afo Verde & Federico Vindver, record producers; Rafa Arcaute, Ray Charles Brown Jr., Jean Rodríguez, Felipe Trujillo & Federico Vindver, recording engineers; Jaycen Joshua & Mike Seaberg, mixers; Jaycen Joshua, mastering engineer
- "Carretera y Manta" – Pablo Alborán
  - Pablo Alborán, record producer; Pablo Pulido & Luis Villa, recording engineers; Lewis Pickett, mixer; Dave Kutch, mastering engineer
- "Déjame Llorarte" – Paula Arenas featuring Jesús Navarro
  - María Elisa Ayerbe & Marcos Sánchez, record producers; María Elisa Ayerbe & Andrés Chano Guardado, recording engineers; María Elisa Ayerbe, mixer; Orlando Ferrer, mastering engineer
- "Shakira: Bzrp Music Sessions, Vol. 53" – Bizarrap featuring Shakira
  - Bizarrap, record producer; Bizarrap, recording engineer; Bizarrap, Dave Clauss, Shakira & Zecca, mixers; Dave Clauss & Zecca, mastering engineers
- "Si Tú Me Quieres" – Fonseca & Juan Luis Guerra
  - Fonseca, Yadam González & Juanes, record producers; Sebastian De Peyrecave, Fonseca & Allan Leschhörn, recording engineers; Juan Mario Aracil & Trevor Muzzy, mixers; Esteban Piñeiro, mastering engineer
- "Mientras Me Curo del Cora" – Karol G
  - Linda Goldstein, Juan Andrés Ospina & Ovy on the Drums, record producers; Juan Andrés Ospina & Ovy on the Drums, recording engineers; Rob Kinelski, mixer; Dave Kutch, mastering engineer
- "Ojos Marrones" – Lasso
  - Renzo Bravo & Orlando Vitto, record producers; Renzo Bravo & Orlando Vitto, recording engineers; Orlando Vitto, mixer; Dave Kutch, mastering engineer
- "La Fórmula" – Maluma & Marc Anthony
  - Marc Anthony, Edgar Barrera, Sergio George, Kevin Mauricio Jiménez Londoño, Bryan Snaider Lezcano Chaverra & Maluma, record producers; Juan Mario Aracil & Arbise "Motiff" González, recording engineers; Juan Mario Aracil, Luis Barrera Jr. & Arbise "Motiff" González, mixers; Adam Ayan, mastering engineer
- "Despechá" – Rosalía
  - Gaby Music, Noah Goldstein, Chris Jedi, Dylan Patrice & Rosalía, record producers; Jake Miller, Roger Rodés & David Rodríguez, recording engineers; Manny Marroquin, mixer; Chris Gehringer, mastering engineer
- "Correcaminos" – Alejandro Sanz featuring Danny Ocean
  - Alizzz, record producer; Alizzz, Frank Lozano & Alfonso Pérez, recording engineers; Lewis Pickett, mixer; Miguel Ángel González, mastering engineer

Album of the Year

- **Mañana Será Bonito – Karol G**
  - **Ovy on the Drums, album producer; Rob Kinelski, album mixer; Kevyn Mauricio Cruz Moreno, Karol G & Ovy on the Drums, songwriters; Dave Kutch, album mastering engineer**
- La Cuarta Hoja – Pablo Alborán
  - Pablo Alborán, Nicolas De La Espriella, Julio Reyes, Paco Salazar & Josh Tampico, album producers; Dabruk, Pablo Pulido, Julio Reyes, Pablo Rouss, Paco Salazar, Josh Tampico, Luis Villa & Xross, album recording engineers; Felipe Guevara & Lewis Pickett, album mixers; Pablo Alborán, Maria Becerra, Álvaro De Luna, Aitana Ocaña & Leo Rizzi, songwriters; Dave Kutch, album mastering engineer
- A Ciegas – Paula Arenas
  - María Elisa Ayerbe & Marcos Sánchez, album producers; María Elisa Ayerbe & Marcos Sánchez, album recording engineers; María Elisa Ayerbe, album mixer; Paula Arenas & Manuel Ramos, songwriters; Orlando Ferrer, album mastering engineer
- De Adentro Pa Afuera – Camilo
  - Juan Ariza, Edgar Barrera, Camilo & Nicolás Ramírez, album producers; Juan Ariza & Nicolás Ramírez, album recording engineers; Maddox Chhim, album mixer; Edgar Barrera & Camilo, songwriters; Mike Bozzi, album mastering engineer
- Décimo Cuarto – Andrés Cepeda
  - Carlos Taboada, album producer; Nicolás Ladrón De Guevara & Andrés Torres, album recording engineers
- Vida Cotidiana – Juanes
  - Emmanuel Briceño Vera, Juanes & Sebastian Krys, album producers; Emmanuel Briceño Vera, Vago Galindo, Juanes, Sebastian Krys & José López, album recording engineers; Vago Galindo & Sebastian Krys, album mixers; Juanes, songwriter; Brian Lucey, album mastering engineer
- De Todas las Flores – Natalia Lafourcade
  - Adan Jodorowsky & Natalia Lafourcade, album producers; Gerardo Ordoñez, album recording engineer; Gerardo Ordoñez, album mixer; Natalia Lafourcade, songwriter; Bernie Grundman, album mastering engineer
- Play – Ricky Martin
  - Kevyn Cruz, Luis Miguel Gómez "Casta", Jc Entertainment, L.E.X.U.Z & Jean Rodríguez, album producers; Enrique LaReals, Sergio Robledo & Jean Rodriguez, album recording engineers; Jaycen Joshua, album mixer; Kevyn Cruz, Ricky Martin & Luis Angel Oneill Laureano, songwriters; Jaycen Joshua, album mastering engineer
- EADDA9223 – Fito Páez
  - Gustavo Borner, Diego Olivero & Fito Páez, album producers; Gustavo Borner, Phil Levine & Diego Olivero, album recording engineers; Gustavo Borner, album mixer; Rodolfo Páez, songwriter; Justin Moshkevich, album mastering engineer
- Escalona Nunca Se Había Grabado Así – Carlos Vives
  - Andrés Leal, Luis Ángel Pastor & Carlos Vives, album producers; Andrés Borda & Francisco Castro, album recording engineers; Javier Garza, album mixer; Rafael Calixto Escalona Martínez, songwriter; Felipe Tichauer, album mastering engineer

Song of the Year

- **"Shakira: Bzrp Music Sessions, Vol. 53"**
  - **Santiago Alvarado, Bizarrap, Kevyn Mauricio Cruz & Shakira, songwriters (Bizarrap featuring Shakira)**
- "Acróstico"
  - Kevyn Mauricio Cruz Moreno, L.E.X.U.Z, Luis Fernando Ochoa & Shakira, songwriters (Shakira)
- "Amigos"
  - Pablo Alborán & Maria Becerra, songwriters (Pablo Alborán featuring Maria Becerra)
- "De Todas las Flores"
  - Natalia Lafourcade, songwriter (Natalia Lafourcade)
- "Ella Baila Sola"
  - Pedro Julian Tovar Oceguera, songwriter (Eslabon Armado & Peso Pluma)
- "NASA"
  - Edgar Barrera, Camilo & Alejandro Sanz, songwriters (Camilo & Alejandro Sanz)
- "Ojos Marrones"
  - Luis Jiménez, Lasso & Agustín Zubillaga, songwriters (Lasso)
- "Si Tú Me Quieres"
  - Fonseca, Yadam González & Yoel Henríquez, songwriters (Fonseca & Juan Luis Guerra)
- "TQG"
  - Kevyn Mauricio Cruz, Karol G, Ovy on the Drums & Shakira, songwriters (Karol G featuring Shakira)
- "Un x100to"
  - Bad Bunny, Edgar Barrera, Marco Daniel Borrero & Andres Jael Correa Rios, songwriters (Grupo Frontera featuring Bad Bunny)

Best New Artist

Joaquina

- Borja
- Conexión Divina
- Ana Del Castillo
- Natascha Falcão
- Gale
- Paola Guanche
- Leon Leiden
- Maréh
- Timø

=== Pop ===
Best Pop Vocal Album

Tu Historia – Julieta Venegas

- La Cuarta Hoja – Pablo Alborán
- Beautiful Humans Vol. 1 – AleMor
- De Adentro Pa Afuera – Camilo
- La Neta – Pedro Capó

Best Traditional Pop Vocal Album

Décimo Cuarto – Andrés Cepeda

- A Ciegas – Paula Arenas
- Que Me Duela – Camilú
- Corazón y Flecha – Manuel Carrasco
- Placeres y Pecados – Vanesa Martín

Best Pop Song

"Shakira: Bzrp Music Sessions, Vol. 53"

Santiago Alvarado, Bizarrap, Kevyn Mauricio Cruz Moreno & Shakira, songwriters (Bizarrap featuring Shakira)

- "5:24"
  - Edgar Barrera & Camilo, songwriters (Camilo)
- "Bailo Pa Ti"
  - Natalia Hernández Morales, Monsieur Periné, Santiago Prieto Sarabia, Julio Reyes Copello & Mitchie Rivera, songwriters (Monsieur Periné)
- "Contigo"
  - Pablo Alboran, Mauricio Rengifo, Andres Torres & Sebastian Yatra, songwriters (Sebastian Yatra featuring Pablo Alboran)
- "Déjame Llorarte"
  - Paula Arenas & Manuel Ramos, songwriters (Paula Arenas & Jesús Navarro)

=== Urban ===
Best Urban Fusion/Performance

"TQG" – Karol G featuring Shakira

- "La Jumpa" – Arcangel featuring Bad Bunny
- "Ojalá" – Maria Becerra
- "Quevedo: Bzrp Music Sessions, Vol. 52" – Bizarrap featuring Quevedo
- "Yandel 150" – Yandel & Feid

Best Reggaeton Performance

"La Receta" – Tego Calderon

- "Automático" – Maria Becerra
- "Feliz Cumpleaños Ferxxo" – Feid
- "Gatúbela" – Karol G featuring Maldy
- "Hey Mor" – Ozuna & Feid

Best Urban Music Album

Mañana Será Bonito – Karol G

- Xtassy – Akapellah
- Saturno – Rauw Alejandro
- 3MEN2 KBRN – Eladio Carrión
- Feliz Cumpleaños Ferxxo Te Pirateamos el Álbum – Feid
- Alma – Nicki Nicole

Best Rap/Hip Hop Song

"Coco Channel"

Bad Bunny & Eladio Carrión, songwriters (Eladio Carrion featuring Bad Bunny)

- "Autodidacta"
  - Mauro De Tommaso & J Noa, songwriters (J Noa)
- "Dispara ***"
  - Santiago Alvarado, Milo J, Nicki Nicole & Santiago Ruiz, songwriters (Nicki Nicole featuring Milo J)
- "Le Pido a Dios"
  - Martin Chris E, Feid & Esteban Higuita Estrada, songwriters (Feid featuring Dj Premier)
- "Pá Ganá"
  - Akapellah, songwriter (Akapellah)
- "Pregúntale a Tu Papá Por Mi"
  - Vico C, songwriter (Vico C)

Best Urban Song

"Quevedo: Bzrp Music Sessions, Vol. 52"

Santiago Alvarado, Bizarrap & Quevedo, songwriters (Bizarrap featuring Quevedo)

- "Automático"
  - Maria Becerra, songwriter (Maria Becerra)
- "La Jumpa"
  - Bad Bunny & Austin Santos, songwriters (Arcangel featuring Bad Bunny)
- "Mi Mejor Canción"
  - Nelson Onell Diaz, Farruko, Gocho, Franklin Jovani Martinez & Eric Perez Rovira, songwriters (Gocho featuring Farruko)
- "TQG"
  - Kevyn Mauricio Cruz, Karol G, Ovy on the Drums & Shakira, songwriters (Karol G featuring Shakira)
- "Yandel 150"
  - Jowan, Andres David Restrepo, Joan Manuel Ubinas Jimenez & Yandel, songwriters (Yandel & Feid)

=== Rock ===
Best Rock Album

Sólo D' Lira – Molotov

- Íntimo Extremo - 30 Años – A.N.I.M.A.L.
- Cowboys de la A3 – Arde Bogotá
- De La Tierra III – De La Tierra
- Dopelganga – Eruca Sativa

Best Rock Song

"Leche de Tigre"

Juan Galeano, songwriter (Diamante Eléctrico featuring Adrian Quesada)

- "Depredadores"
  - Andrés Giménez & Andreas Kisser, songwriters (De La Tierra)
- "El Piso es Lava"
  - Todo Aparenta Normal, songwriter (Todo Aparenta Normal featuring An Espil & Evlay)
- "Gris"
  - Juanes, songwriter (Juanes)
- "Los Perros"
  - Arde Bogotá, songwriters (Arde Bogotá)

Best Pop/Rock Album

Vida Cotidiana – Juanes

- El Diablo en el Cuerpo – Alex Anwandter
- Trinchera Avanzada – Babasónicos
- El Hombrecito del Mar – León Gieco
- Tripolar – Usted Señálemelo
- Despídeme de Todxs – Juan Pablo Vega

Best Pop/Rock Song

"Ojos Marrones"

Luis Jiménez, Lasso & Agustín Zubillaga, songwriters (Lasso)

- "Alaska"
  - Bunbury, songwriter (Bunbury)
- "Amantes"
  - León Larregui, songwriter (León Larregui)
- "Caminar Sola"
  - Alex Anwandter & Julieta Venegas, songwriters (Julieta Venegas)
- "¿Dónde Se Llora Cuando Se Llora?"
  - Francisca Valenzuela & Francisco Victoria, songwriters (Francisca Valenzuela)
- "Señorita Revolución"
  - Bruses & Ali Stone, songwriters (Bruses)

=== Alternative ===
Best Alternative Music Album

Bolero Apocalíptico – Monsieur Periné

- Martínez – Cabra
- Nacarile – iLe
- Mesa Dulce – Dante Spinetta
- Reputa – Zahara

Best Alternative Song

"El Lado Oscuro del Corazón"

Dante Spinetta, songwriter (Dante Spinetta)

- "Aleros/Pompeii"
  - Sebastian Ayala, Daniel Briceño, Henry D'Arthenay, Rodolfo Pagliuca & Hector Tosta, songwriters (La Vida Bohème)
- "ANASTASIA"
  - Cami & Jonathan Julca, songwriters (Cami)
- "Cicatriz Radiante"
  - El David Aguilar, songwriter (El David Aguilar)
- "Traguito"
  - Ismael Cancel, iLe & Mon Laferte, songwriters (iLe & Mon Laferte)

=== Tropical ===
Best Salsa Album

Niche Sinfónico – Grupo Niche & Orquesta Sinfónica Nacional de Colombia

- Catarsis – Daniela Darcourt
- Voy a Ti – Luis Figueroa
- Cambios – Willy García
- Tierra y Libertad – Plena79 Salsa Orchestra featuring Alain Pérez & Jeremy Bosch
- Debut y Segunda Tanda (Deluxe) – Gilberto Santa Rosa

Best Cumbia/Vallenato Album

Escalona Nunca Se Había Grabado Así – Carlos Vives

- Leandro Díaz Special Edition – Silvestre Dangond
- El Favor de Dios – Ana del Castillo
- Cumbia del Corazón – Los Ángeles Azules
- Hombre Absurdo – Gregorio Uribe

Best Merengue/Bachata Album

Fórmula, Vol. 3 – Romeo Santos
A Mi Manera – Sergio Vargas

- Cuatro26 – Manny Cruz
- Road Trip – Manny Manuel
- Trópico, Vol. 2 – Pavel Núñez

Best Traditional Tropical Album

Vida – Omara Portuondo

- Tierra, Songs By Cuban Women – Estrella Acosta
- Y Sigo Pa'lante – El Septeto Santiaguero
- Tour Sinfónico En Vivo Auditorio Nacional – Sonora Santanera
- Danzoneando (En Vivo Desde Matanzas) – Orquesta Failde
- En Tiempo de Son... Homenaje a las Canciones de: Jorge Luis Piloto – Septeto Acarey de Reynier Pérez

Best Contemporary Tropical Album

5:10 AM – Luis Fernando Borjas

- Contigo – Mike Bahía
- Intruso – Silvestre Dangond
- 24/7 – Gusi
- Otro Color – Ilegales

Best Tropical Song

"Si Tú Me Quieres"

Fonseca, Yadam González & Yoel Henríquez, songwriters (Fonseca & Juan Luis Guerra)

- "Ambulancia"
  - Edgar Barrera, Camila Cabello, Camilo & Juan Morelli, songwriters (Camilo & Camila Cabello)
- "Día de Luz (80 Aniversario)"
  - Pablo Milanés, songwriter (Pablo Milanés featuring Juanes)
- "El Merengue"
  - Edgar Barrera, Nico Cotton, Gale, Marshmello, Miguel Andres Martinez Perea, Johan Arjona, Julián Turizo Zapata & Manuel Turizo, songwriters (Marshmello & Manuel Turizo)
- "La Fórmula"
  - Marc Anthony, Edgar Barrera, René David Cano Ríos, Sergio George, Kevin Mauricio Jiménez Londoño, Bryan Snaider Lezcano Chaverra, Maluma & Justin Rafael Quiles, songwriters (Maluma & Marc Anthony)
- "Que Me Quedes Tú"
  - Techy Fatule, songwriter (Techy Fatule)

=== Songwriter ===
Best Singer-Songwriter Album

De Todas las Flores – Natalia Lafourcade

- Nueve – Santiago Cruz
- Los Mejores Años – Joaquina
- "Tierra de Promesas" – Maréh
- El Equilibrista – Juan Carlos Pérez Soto

Best Singer-Songwriter Song

"De Todas las Flores"

Natalia Lafourcade, songwriter (Natalia Lafourcade)

- "La Raíz"
  - Valeria Castro, songwriter (Valeria Castro)
- "1.200 Kilómetros"
  - Santiago Cruz, songwriter (Santiago Cruz)
- "Si Me Matan"
  - Silvana Estrada, songwriter (Silvana Estrada)
- "Tu Historia, la Mía y la Verdad"
  - Juan Carlos Pérez Soto, songwriter (Juan Carlos Pérez Soto)

=== Regional Mexican ===
Best Ranchero/Mariachi Album

Forajido EP2 – Christian Nodal

- Se Canta con el Corazón (Deluxe) – Majo Aguilar
- Bordado a Mano – Ana Bárbara
- Sólo Muere Si Se Olvida – Adriel Favela
- Herederos – Mariachi Herencia de México

Best Banda Album

De Hoy en Adelante, Que Te Vaya Bien – Julión Álvarez y Su Norteño Banda

- Hecho en México...Mágico – Banda El Recodo de Cruz Lizárraga
- Punto y Aparte – Banda MS de Sergio Lizárraga
- Una Copa Por Cada Reina – Nathan Galante
- 1500 Pedas – La Adictiva
- Prefiero Estar Contigo (Deluxe) – La Arrolladora Banda El Limón de René Camacho

Best Tejano Album

Para Empezar a Amar – Juan Treviño

- Sin Fin – Gary Hobbs
- El Patrón – Jay Perez
- Super Heroes de Blanco – Proyecto Insomnio
- Ganas – Vilax

Best Norteño Album

Colmillo de Leche – Carin León

- Aclarando la Mente – Joss Favela
- Family & Friends – La Abuela Irma Silva
- Fuera de Serie – La Energía Norteña
- Hay Niveles (Deluxe) – Los Rieleros del Norte

Best Regional Mexican Song

"Un x100to"

Bad Bunny, Edgar Barrera, Andrés Jael Correa Rios & Mag, songwriters (Grupo Frontera featuring Bad Bunny)

- "Aclarando la Mente"
  - Joss Favela, songwriter (Joss Favela)
- "Alaska"
  - Edgar Barrera & Camilo, songwriters (Camilo & Grupo Firme)
- "Ella Baila Sola"
  - Pedro Julian Tovar Oceguera, songwriter (Eslabon Armado & Peso Pluma)
- "La Siguiente"
  - Edgar Barrera, Kany García, Richi López & Christian Nodal, songwriters (Kany García featuring Christian Nodal)

=== Instrumental ===
Best Instrumental Album

Made in Miami – Camilo Valencia & Richard Bravo

- Tres – Renesito Avich
- Choro Negro – Cristovão Bastos & Mauro Senise
- Brooklyn-Cumana – Jorge Glem & Sam Reider
- The Chick Corea Symphony Tribute. Ritmo – ADDA Simfònica, Josep Vicent & Emilio Solla
- Romance al Campesino Porteño – Miguel Zenón, José A. Zayas Cabán, Ryan Smith & Casey Rafn

=== Traditional ===
Best Folk Album

Camino al Sol – Vicente García

- Epifanías – Susana Baca
- Aguajes de Mar y Manglar – Cantares del Pacífico
- Mamá Cumbé – Tato Marenco
- El Trébol Agorero, Homenaje a Luis Antonio Calvo – Quinteto Leopoldo Federico
- Ayvu – Tierra Adentro

Best Tango Album

Operation Tango – Quinteto Astor Piazzolla

- Retrato del Aire – Pablo Jaurena
- Reencuentro – Susana Rinaldi & Osvaldo Piro
- Ahora – Romo - Agri - Messiez Tango Trio
- Argentinxs – Tanghetto

Best Flamenco Album

Camino – Niña Pastori

- Pura Sangre – Israel Fernández
- Por la Tangente – Diego Guerrero
- Quejíos de un Maleante – Omar Montes
- Prohibido el Toque – Juanfe Pérez

=== Jazz ===
Best Latin Jazz/Jazz Album

I Missed You Too! – Chucho Valdés & Paquito D'Rivera (with Reunion Sextet)

- Unánime – Roxana Amed
- Flying Chicken – Hamilton de Holanda featuring Thiago Rabello & Salomão Soares
- Bembé – Iván "Melon" Lewis & The Cuban Swing Express
- Semblanzas – William Maestre Big Band

=== Christian ===
Best Christian Album (Spanish Language)

Lo Que Vemos – Marcos Vidal

- Fuego & Poder (Live) – Barak
- Vida – Alex Campos
- El Vallenato Se Hizo en el Cielo – Gilberto Daza & Sergio Luis Rodríguez
- Hazme Caminar – Jesús Israel
- El Cielo Aún Espera – Jesús Adrián Romero

Best Christian Album (Portuguese Language)

Nós – Eli Soares

- 30 Anos Vol 1 – Aline Barros
- Novo Tempo – Casa Worship
- Único – Fernandinho
- Preto No Branco Vertical – Preto No Branco

=== Portuguese language ===
Best Portuguese Language Contemporary Pop Album

Em Nome da Estrela – Xênia França

- Bryan Behr Ao Vivo Em São Paulo – Bryan Behr
- Hodari – Hodari
- Quintal – Melim
- As Palavras, Vol. 1 & 2 – Rubel

Best Portuguese Language Rock or Alternative Album

Jardineiros – Planet Hemp

- Não Me Espere Na Estação – Lô Borges
- Meu Esquema – Rachel Reis
- Habilidades Extraordinárias – Tulipa Ruiz
- Olho Furta-Cor – Titãs

Best Portuguese-Language Urban Performance

"Distopia" – Planet Hemp featuring Criolo

- "Da Favela Pro Asfalto" – Àttooxxá and Carlinhos Brown
- "Aviso de Amigo" – Giulia Be
- "Fé" – IZA
- "Good Vibe" – Filipe Ret, Dallass, Caio Luccas

Best Samba/Pagode Album

Negra Ópera – Martinho Da Vila

- Resenha Do Mumu – Mumuzinho
- Desse Jeito – Maria Rita
- Sambasá – Roberta Sá
- Meu Nome É Thiago André (Ao Vivo) – Thiaguinho

Best MPB (Musica Popular Brasileira) Album

Serotonina – João Donato

- Mil Coisas Invisíveis – Tim Bernardes
- Vem Doce – Vanessa da Mata
- D – Djavan
- Daramô – Tiago Iorc

Best Sertaneja Music Album

Decretos Reais – Marília Mendonça

  - Ao Vivo no Radio City Music Hall Nova Iorque – Chitãozinho & Xororó
  - Daniel 40 Anos Celebra João Paulo & Daniel – Daniel
  - É Simples Assim (Ao Vivo) – Jorge & Mateus
  - Raiz – Lauana Prado

Best Portuguese Language Roots Album

TecnoShow – Gaby Amarantos

- Portuguesa – Carminho
- Raiz – João Gomes
- Elba Ramalho No Maior São João Do Mundo – Elba Ramalho
- Do Amanha Nada Sei – Almir Sater
- Erva Doce – Gabriel Sater

Best Portuguese Language Song

"Tudo O Que A Fé Pode Tocar"

Tiago Iorc & Duda Rodrigues, songwriters (Tiago Iorc)

- "Algoritmo Íntimo"
  - Arnaldo Antunes, Criolo, Gabrieu, Keviin & Marcia Xavier, songwriters (Criolo & Ney Matogrosso)
- "Do Acaso"
  - Ronaldo Bastos & Chico César, songwriters (Alice Caymmi featuring Chico César)
- "Num Mundo De Paz"
  - Djavan, songwriter (Djavan)
- "Que Tal um Samba?"
  - Chico Buarque, songwriter (Chico Buarque featuring Hamilton de Holanda)

=== Children's ===
Best Latin Children's Album

Vamos al Zoo – Danilo & Chapis

- Aventuras – Flor Bromley
- Cantando Juntos – Gaby Moreno & Zona Neon
- Colcha de Retazos – María Mulata
- ¿Y Si Pido Que Me Cuentes? – Veleta Roja

=== Classical ===
Best Classical Album

Huáscar Barradas Four Elements Immersive Symphony for Orchestra and Chorus – Simón Bolívar Symphony Orchestra Ollantay Velasquez, conductor; Huáscar Barradas, Maria Cardemas, Eugenio Carreño & Eduardo Martinez Planas, album producers

- Afro-Cuban Dances – Kristhyan Benitez
  - Jon Feidner, album producer
- Albéniz & Granados Piano Works – Luis López
  - Fernando Ortí Salvador, album producer
- Cantata Negra – Marvin Camacho & UCR Coral
  - Didier Mora, conductor; Marvin Camacho Villegas & Jorge Castro Ruiz, album producers
- Estirpe – Pacho Flores
  - Carlos Miguel Prieto, conductor; Ingo Petry, album producer (Orquesta Sinfónica de Minería)

Best Classical Contemporary Composition

"Concerto Venezolano"
Paquito D'Rivera, composer (Pacho Flores featuring Paquito D'Rivera)

- "Aroma a Distancia (Live from Paliesius, Lithuania)"
  - Gonzalo Grau, composer (Brooklyn Rider)
- "Double Concerto for Clarinet and Bandoneon, III. Aboriginal"
  - JP Jofre, composer (JP Jofre and Seunghee Lee)
- "Lucha Libre!"
  - Juan Pablo Contreras, composer (Juan Pablo Contreras)
- "Suite de los Buenos Aires para Piano y Flauta"
  - Claudia Montero, composer (Natalia González Figueroa and Tanja Esther Von Arx)

=== Arrangement ===
Best Arrangement

"Songo Bop"

Rafael Valencia, arranger (Camilo Valencia, Richard Bravo featuring Milton Salcedo)

- "Waltz of the Flowers"
  - Joe McCarthy & Vince Norman, arrangers (Joe McCarthy's New York Afro Bop Alliance Big Band)
- "Com Que Voz"
  - John Beasley & Maria Mendes, arrangers (Maria Mendes featuring Metropole Orkest & John Beasley)
- "Crónicas Latinoamericanas"
  - Daniel Freiberg, arranger (Various Artists)
- "Spain"
  - Emilio Solla, arranger (Various Artists)

=== Recording Package ===
Best Recording Package

Atipanakuy (Deluxe)
Gustavo Ramirez, art director (Kayfex)

- Hotel Miranda!
  - Alejandro Ros, art director (Miranda!)
- Nocturna
  - Alejandro Ros, art director (Javiera Mena)
- Placeres y Pecados
  - Pedro Chico, art director (Vanesa Martín)
- Trinchera Avanzada
  - Alejandro Ros, art director (Babasonicos)

=== Songwriter ===
Songwriter of the Year

Edgar Barrera

  - **"La Bachata" (Manuel Turizo)**
  - **"La Reina" (Maluma)**
  - **"Nasa" (Camilo, Alejandro Sanz)**
  - **"Que Vuelvas" (Carin Leon, Grupo Frontera)**
  - **"Si Te Preguntan..." (Nicky Jam, Prince Royce & Jay Wheeler)**
  - **"Te Amo y Punto" (Chayanne)**
  - **"Un Cumbión Dolido" (Christian Nodal)**
  - **"Un x100to" (Grupo Frontera & Bad Bunny)**
  - **"Yo Primero" (Rels B)**
- Kevyn Mauricio Cruz
  - "Amargura" (Karol G)
  - "Cairo" (Karol G & Ovy on the Drums)
  - "Carolina" (Karol G)
  - "Chao Bebe" (Ovy on the Drums & Ozuna)
  - "Kármika" (Karol G, Bad Gyal & Sean Paul)
  - "La Reina" (Maluma)
  - "Mi Pecadito" (Mike Bahía & Greeicy)
  - "Mientras Me Curo del Cora" (Karol G)
  - "X Si Volvemos" (Karol G & Romeo Santos)
  - "Provenza" (Karol G)
  - "Shakira: Bzrp Music Sessions, Vol. 53" (Bizarrap featuring Shakira)
  - "TQG" (Karol G featuring Shakira)
- Felipe González Abad
  - "Con Tu Recuerdo" (Nora González)
  - "Corazón" (Alfred García)
  - "El Plan" (Antonio José & Miguel Poveda)
  - "Quien Como Yo" (Antonio Villeroy featuring Georgina)
  - "Salir Con Vida" (Morat & Feid)
  - "Te Vale Madre" (Matisse & Edén Muñoz)
- Manuel Lorente Freire
  - "Alcancía" (Llane, Reik & Khea)
  - "Arranca" (Becky G featuring Omega)
  - "Bayamón" (Elena Rose)
  - "5 Estrellas" (Reik & Sech)
  - "Eclipse" (Khea)
  - "Nervous (Remix)" (John Legend featuring Sebastián Yatra)
  - "Ojos Marrones" (Lasso featuring Sebastián Yatra)
  - "Una Noche Sin Pensar" (Sebastian Yatra)
- Horacio Palencia
  - "A Ver Cómo Le Haces" (El Bebeto)
  - "Gente Corriente" (La Adictiva)
  - "911 (En Vivo)" (Fuerza Regida & Grupo Frontera)
  - "Nunca Dudes en Llamarme" (La Arrolladora Banda El Limón de René Camacho & Alejandro Fernández)
  - "Prometo" (Banda Los Sebastianes de Saúl Plata & Kurt)
  - "Tú y Mi Ex" (Banda Los Sebastianes de Saúl Plata)
- Elena Rose
  - "Arranca" (Becky G featuring Omega)
  - "5 Estrellas" (Reik & Sech)
  - "Cupido" (Tini)
  - "No Se Acaba Hasta Que Acabe" (Lagos & Reik)
  - "Permanente" (Lagos)
  - "Por el Resto de Tu Vida" (Christian Nodal & Tini)

=== Production ===
Best Engineered Album

Canto a la Imaginación

Érico Moreira, engineer; Érico Moreira, mixer; Felipe Tichauer, mastering engineer (Marina Tuset)

- Daramô
  - Bruno Giorgi, mixer; Randy Merrill, mastering engineer (Tiago Iorc)
- Depois Do Fim
  - Túlio Airold, Victor Amaral & Pedro Peixoto, engineers; João Milliet & Pedro Peixoto, mixers; Fili Filizzola, mastering engineer (Lagum)
- Octet and Originals
  - Roger Freret, engineer; Marcelo Saboia, mixer; Andre Dias, mastering engineer (Antonio Adolfo)
- Quietude
  - Rodrigo de Castro Lopes, engineer; Pete Karam, mixer; Paul Blakemore, mastering engineer (Eliane Elias)
- Solar
  - Thiago Baggio, engineer; Thiago Monteiro, mixer; Thiago Monteiro, mastering engineer (Vanessa Moreno)

Producer of the Year

Edgar Barrera

  - **"Ambulancia" (Camilo & Camila Cabello)**
  - **"Bebe Dame" (Fuerza Regida & Grupo Frontera)**
  - **"El Merengue" (Marshmello & Manuel Turizo)**
  - **"Gucci Los Paños" (Karol G)**
  - **"La Bachata" (Manuel Turizo)**
  - **"La Fórmula" (Maluma & Marc Anthony)**
  - **"Me Extraño" (Romeo Santos & Christian Nodal)**
  - **"Nasa" (Camilo & Alejandro Sanz)**
  - **"Pa Quererte" (Rels B)**
  - **"Por el Resto de Tu Vida" (Christian Nodal & Tini)**
  - **"Que Vuelvas" (Carin León & Grupo Frontera)**
  - **"Un x100to" (Grupo Frontera & Bad Bunny)**
  - **Una Copa Por Cada Reina (Deluxe) (Nathan Galante)**
- Bizarrap
  - "Arcángel: Bzrp Music Sessions, Vol. 54" (Bizarrap featuring Arcángel)
  - "Bottas" (Arcángel, Duki & Bizarrap)
  - "Duki: Bzrp Music Sessions, Vol. 50" (Bizarrap featuring Duki)
  - "Quevedo: Bzrp Music Sessions, Vol. 52" (Bizarrap featuring Quevedo)
  - "Shakira: Bzrp Music Sessions, Vol. 53" (Bizarrap featuring Shakira)
  - "Villano Antillano: Bzrp Music Sessions, Vol. 51" (Bizarrap featuring Villano Antillano)
- Eduardo Cabra
  - "Barriletes" (Los Caligaris)
  - El Día Antes del Día (Sie7e)
  - "Flan" (El Cuarteto de Nos)
  - Galería (Rafa Pabón)
  - Martínez (Cabra)
  - "Más Animal" (Rodrigo Cuevas featuring iLe)
  - "Niños Dorados" (Cami)
  - Salitre (Seba Otero)
  - Selva (Silvina Moreno)
- Nico Cotton
  - "Brinca" (Cazzu & Young Miko)
  - "El Merengue" (Marshmello & Manuel Turizo)
  - "Flores" (Daniela Spalla)
  - "Jaula de Oro" (Leiva & Conociendo Rusia)
  - "La La" (Marilina Bertoldi)
  - La Nena de Argentina (Maria Becerra)
  - "Las Flores Sangran" (Usted Señalemelo)
  - Natural (Soledad)
  - "Nena, Dime Algo" (Usted Señalemelo)
  - "Nuevo Comienzo" (Usted Señalemelo)
  - "Peli-Culeo (Remix)" (Cazzu, De La Ghetto, Randy featuring Ñengo Flow & Justin Quiles)
- Julio Reyes Copello
  - "De Penita y Rabia" (Cami)
  - "El Cuerpo Que Habito" (Agris)
  - "Los Mejores Años" (Joaquina)
  - "Miracle" (Riza)
  - Sincerándome Disco 1 (Carlos Rivera)
- Marcos Sánchez
  - "A Ciegas" (Paula Arenas)
  - "La Fiesta De Mi Calle" (Manolo Ramos)
  - "Mala Mía, Me Fui" (Manolo Ramos)
  - Que Me Duela (Camilú)
  - "Solamente Estás Tu" (Camilú)

=== Music video ===
Best Short Form Music Video

"Estás Buenísimo" – Nathy Peluso

Félix Bollaín & Rogelio González, video directors; María Rubio, video producer

- "Podcast/Pedra Memória" – Kayode
  - Gabriel Avelar & Beto Galloni, video directors; Hugo Castelo Branco, Bruna Fernandes, André Cozman Ganut, Kozmos, Paladino, Regis Ramos & Yalla Rec, video producers
- "Fixação" – Luthuly featuring Nave
  - Pedro Fiorillo & Jesus Mendes, video directors; Alcino Algarrao, Alcino Araujo, Ricardo Estevam, Paulo Miguez & Pamela Taby, video producers
- "No Quiero Ser un Cantante" – Sen Senra
  - Torso, video director; Cap Dept, video producer
- "DESCARTABLE" – Wos
  - Tomas Curland & Rafael Nir, video directors; Mariano Jaureguiberry, Abril Neistadt, Rafael Nir & Diego Ríos, video producers

Best Long Form Music Video

Camilo: El Primer Tour de Mi Vida – Camilo

Camilo & Camilo Ríos, video directors; Mauricio Ríos, video producer

- Donde Machi - Album Completo – Dawer X Damper
  - Ivan Vernaza, video director; Alejandro Velasco Ochoa, video producer
- Fanm Zetwal, Una Historia de Vida u Milagros – Fanm Zetwal
  - Claudia Hernández Romero, video director; Francisco Núñez, video producer
- Universo K23 – Kenia Os
  - Flakka, video director; Compostela Films & Art, video producer
- Patria y Vida: The Power of Music – Various Artists
  - Beatriz Luengo, video director; Michael Fux, Beatriz Luengo, Gloria Rubin & Yotuel, video producers

=== Special awards ===
Person of the Year

- **Laura Pausini**

Lifetime Achievement Award

- **Carmen Linares**
- **Manuel Mijares**
- **Arturo Sandoval**
- **Simone**
- **Soda Stereo**
- **Ana Torroja**

Trustees Award

- **Alex Acuña**
- **Gustavo Santaolalla**
- **Wisón Torres**

Leading Ladies of Entertainment

- **Róndine Alcalá**
- **Mon Laferte**
- **Simone Torres**
- **Ana Villacorta Lópezz**

== Most Wins ==
3 Wins

- Bizarrap
- Edgar Barrera
- Karol G
- Natalia Lafourcade
- Shakira
- Santiago Alvarado

== Background ==
In March 2023, the Latin Recording Academy announced several changes for different categories:

=== Category changes ===
- Three new categories – Songwriter of the Year, Best Singer-Songwriter Song and Best Portuguese-Language Urban Performance – were added.
- To qualify as a nominee on a project nominated for Album of the Year, the credited artists, producers, engineers, mixers, mastering engineers and songwriters must play on a total of 33% of an album's playing time.
- For all the song categories, it is now required to include the date of composition when submitting a product to said categories.
- To qualify as a nominee on a project nominated for Best Engineered Album, the credited recording engineer(s) and mixing engineer must play on a total of 33% of an album's playing time, while the credited mastering engineer(s) must be on at least 51% of the album.

== Location ==
The 24th Annual Grammy Awards will mark the first time ever since its inauguration in 2000 that the ceremony is going to be held outside the United States. According to the President of the Regional Government of Andalusia, Juan Manuel Moreno, hosting the Latin Grammys in Seville could bring local tourism "an additional 12,000 people" and "media exposure" to the city, boosting the region's economic activity as well up to $3.2 billion.

=== Controversy ===
Since the late 2010s, the inclusion of artists from Spain in the awards has garnered controversy from social media users who noted the Spanish colonization of the Americas and the Academy itself has been accused of whitewashing by favoring Spaniards and White Latin Americans over Afro–Latin Americans. Furthermore, reggaeton was once stigmatized as the "music of immigrants" in Spain.

Following the announcement of the new host city, criticism and debates arose towards its election, citing that "the European country [Spain] isn’t part of Latin America". Manuel Abud, CEO of the Latin Recording Academy, has responded to disapproval on the inclusion of Spain by pointing out that "Latin music has been defined by Spanish and Portuguese languages", and that the decision of hosting the ceremony overseas "is a gateway for artists to bring their music to Spain, and to Europe".
