= Latin Grammy Award for Songwriter of the Year =

Music award category

- Awarded for: exceptional achievements in songwriting
- Country: United States
- Presented by: The Latin Recording Academy
- Currently held by: Edgar Barrera (2025)
- Website: latingrammy.com

The Latin Grammy Award for Songwriter of the Year is an award presented annually by the Latin Academy of Recording Arts & Sciences at the Latin Grammy Awards.

The description of the category at the 2023 Latin Grammy Awards states that it is intended for "songwriters with a minimum of six newly written songs in which they are credited as a songwriter or co-writer and are not the performer, producer or engineer." Singles and tracks from a previous year, instrumental recordings, cover songs, remixes, and interpolation/sampling recordings are not eligible.

The category will be first awarded at the 24th Annual Latin Grammy Awards in 2023, alongside two other categories (Best Singer-Songwriter Song and Best Portuguese-Language Urban Performance) that were also introduced said year.

== Recipients ==
Year	Recipient(s) and songwriting credits	Nominees	Ref.
2023	(United States) Édgar Barrera: "La Bachata" (Manuel Turizo) • "La Reina" (Maluma) • "Nasa" (Camilo, Alejandro Sanz) • "Que Vuelvas" (Carin Leon, Grupo Frontera) • "Si Te Preguntan..." (Nicky Jam, Prince Royce & Jay Wheeler) • "Te Amo y Punto" (Chayanne) • "Un Cumbión Dolido" (Christian Nodal) • "Un x100to" (Grupo Frontera & Bad Bunny) • "Yo Primero" (Rels B)	Kevyn Mauricio Cruz – "Amargura", "Carolina", "Mientras Me Curo del Cora", "Provenza" (Karol G), "Cairo" (Karol G & Ovy on the Drums), "Chao Bebe" (Ovy on the Drums & Ozuna), "Kármika" (Karol G, Bad Gyal & Sean Paul), "La Reina" (Maluma), "Mi Pecadito" (Mike Bahía & Greeicy), "X Si Volvemos" (Karol G & Romeo Santos), "Shakira: Bzrp Music Sessions, Vol. 53" (Bizarrap & Shakira), "TQG" (Karol G & Shakira); Felipe González Abad – "Con Tu Recuerdo" (Nora González), "Corazón" (Alfred García), "El Plan" (Antonio José & Miguel Poveda), "Quien Como Yo" (Antonio Villeroy featuring Georgina), "Salir Con Vida" (Morat & Feid), "Te Vale Madre" (Matisse & Edén Muñoz); Manuel Lorente Freire – "Alcancía" (Llane, Reik & Khea), "Arranca" (Becky G featuring Omega), "Bayamón" (Elena Rose), "5 Estrellas" (Reik & Sech), "Eclipse" (Khea), "Nervous (Remix)" (John Legend featuring Sebastián Yatra), "Ojos Marrones" (Lasso featuring Sebastián Yatra), "Una Noche Sin Pensar" (Sebastian Yatra); Horacio Palencia – "A Ver Cómo Le Haces" (El Bebeto), "Gente Corriente" (La Adictiva), "911 (En Vivo)" (Fuerza Regida & Grupo Frontera), "Nunca Dudes en Llamarme" (La Arrolladora Banda El Limón de René Camacho & Alejandro Fernández), "Prometo" (Banda Los Sebastianes de Saúl Plata & Kurt), "Tú y Mi Ex" (Banda Los Sebastianes de Saúl Plata); Elena Rose – "Arranca" (Becky G featuring Omega), "5 Estrellas" (Reik & Sech), "Cupido" (Tini), "No Se Acaba Hasta Que Acabe" (Lagos & Reik), "Permanente" (Lagos), "Por el Resto de Tu Vida" (Christian Nodal & Tini)	
2024	(United States) Édgar Barrera: "Cuestion de Tiempo" (Don Omar), "En Tus Sueños o En Los Míos", "No Se Vale" (Camilo), "(Entre Paréntesis)" (Shakira & Grupo Frontera), "Mi Ex Tenía Razón" (Karol G), "Ojos Verdes" (Nicki Nicole), "The One (Pero No Como Yo)" (Carin León & Kane Brown), "Por el Contrario" (Becky G, Angela Aguilar & Leonardo Aguilar), "XL" (Grupo Firme & Luis Mexia)	Yoel Henríquez – "Equipo Favorito" (India Martínez feauring La Adictiva), "Eres Tú" (Diego Torres), "La Que Se Nos Viene" (Emmanuel), "La Sicóloga" (Fonseca), "Llorar Bonito", "Todas Menos Una" (Luis Figueroa), "Mi X" (Kenia Os), "Tienes Que Ser Tú" (La Energía Norteña); Manuel Lorente Freire – "El Jefe" (Shakira & Fuerza Regida), "(Entre Paréntesis)" (Shakira & Grupo Frontera), "Existo" (Carin León & Pedro Capó), "Feriado" (Rawayana), "Igual Que un Ángel" (Kali Uchis & Peso Pluma), "Legendario" (Nathy Peluso), "Nunca La Olvidé" (Grupo Frontera), "2ndo Chance" (Becky G & Iván Cornejo), "Vocation" (Ozuna & David Guetta); Horacio Palencia – "Ahí la Llevo" (Carin León & Hijos de Barron), "Alch Si" (Carin León & Grupo Frontera), "Alguien de Aquí" (Nathan Galante & Gerardo Coronel), "Buen Provecho" (La Adictiva & Gerardo Coronel), "En Altavoz" (Grupo Frontera & Junior H), "Ojitos Rojos" (Grupo Frontera & Ke Personajes), "Se Cancela la Depre (En Vivo)" (Grupo Firme), "Tu Perfume" (Banda Ms De Sergio Lizárraga), "Ya Pedo Quién Sabe" (Grupo Frontera & Christian Nodal); Pablo Preciado – "Ahora" (David Bisbal & Carlos Rivera), "Corazón a Medio Día", "Hasta Que Me Duermo" (Pepe Aguilar), "De Tanto" (Chayanne), "El Amor Cuando Se Va", "Mi Alma Rota (Tanto)", "Ojalá Estuvieras Aquí" (Intocable), "Te Acuerdas" (Ha*Ash & Reik)	
2025	(United States) Edgar Barrera: "Atención" (Iván Cornejo), "Contigo al Cielo" (Christian Nodal), "Ese Vato No Te Queda" (Carin León featuring Gabito Ballesteros), "Hoy No Me Siento Bien" (Alejandro Sanz & Grupo Frontera), "Milagros", "Si Antes Te Hubiera Conocido" (Karol G), "Soltera" (Shakira), "Tommy & Pamela" (Peso Pluma & Kenia Os), "Una Noche Contigo" (Juanes)	João Ferreira – "A Gente Pode Sair Dessa" (Vitor Kley), "Água-Viva" (Anavitória), "As Desvantagens De Amar Alguém Que Mora Longe" (Lagum), "Flores Da Rua" (Samuel Rosa); Pablo Preciado – "Cosas del Destino (El Divorcio)" (Los Tigres del Norte), "Me Gusta Mi Vida" (Intocable), "No Quiero Hablar" (Ángela Aguilar), "Sé Feliz X Mi" (Christian Nodal), "Ya No La Friegues" (Carín León); Mónica Vélez – "A Dos de Borrarte" (Ángela Aguilar), "Bendito Desamor" (Río Roma), "Para Siempre Triste" (Gloria Trevi & Mónica Naranjo), "Por Si Me Vuelves a Querer", "Supernova" (Camila); Ale Zéguer – "El Amor de Mi Herida" (Carín León), "La Bienvenida" (Yuridia), "Miedo a las Alturas" (Sofi Saar), "Nadie Se Va Como Llegó", "Un Minuto de Silencio" (Ángela Aguilar), "Polvo de Gigantes" (Kurt & Edén Muñoz), "¿Quién Lo Hará?" (Carlos Rivera), "Regresa" (Camila), "Te Tardaste" (Río Roma)	
