= Crudo Means Raw =

American singer-songwriter

- Born: Fernando Bustamante Ramirez; New York City
- Genres: Hip hop; Reggaeton; Urbano music; R&B
- Occupations: Rapper; singer; songwriter; producer
- Instruments: Vocals; production; beat-making
- Years active: 2012–present
- Label: Independent

Fernando Bustamante Ramirez (born 1988), known professionally as Crudo Means Raw, is a Colombian-American rapper, singer, songwriter and producer. Born in Long Island, lived there until age five before moving to Medellin. Reached popularity in 2018 when his song "La Mitad de la Mitad" reached number one on Spotify Colombia's top songs chart.

== Biography ==
=== Early life ===
Fernando Bustamante was born in Long Island to Colombian parents who immigrated to the United States to work. He lived there before moving to Medellin, Colombia at age five to live with his mother. He began rapping in high school with his classmate J Balvin. The rapper adopted his stage name Crudo Means Raw because in his words, "that's how my music sounds, no other way to describe it. My music is raw, without hidden meanings, and the sound is organic, natural...I make music without labels, that most people can identify with. Growing up, he drew influence from New York hip-hop acts A Tribe Called Quest and Gang Starr.

=== Career ===
In 2018, his song "La Mitad de la Mitad" reached number one on Spotify Colombia's top songs chart. He made a guest appearance on the song "Aurora" from Colombian singer-songwriter Juanes' album Más Futuro Que Pasado. In December 2019, he released the R&B-influenced single "La Titular" with Colombian singer Mabiland. He released the album Esmeraldas on March 30, 2020. Elias Leight of Rolling Stone described his song "Novena" from Esmeraldas "complex and more convincing...a track like few others that have been released this year."

== Discography ==
- Amalgama Beats (2012)
- Voyage: El Pasaje (2015)
- Todos Tienen Que Comer (2016)
- Receso Solo (2019)
- Esmeraldas (2020)
- La Infusión I (2020)
- War Dog (2023)
- Nave Madre (2026)
