= Latin Grammy Award for Best Pop/Rock Album =

Annual music award

- Awarded for: recordings of the Rock genre
- Country: United States
- Presented by: The Latin Recording Academy
- First award: 2012
- Currently held by: Juanes for Juanesteban (2026)
- Website: latingrammy.com

The Latin Grammy Award for Best Pop/Rock Album is an honor presented annually at the Latin Grammy Awards, a ceremony that recognizes excellence and creates a wider awareness of cultural diversity and contributions of Latin recording artists in the United States and internationally. It is one of the new categories added for the Latin Grammy Awards of 2012

The description of the category at the 2020 Latin Grammy Awards states that "a Pop/Rock album is one that stands out for combining Pop-related melodies/words with Rock elements or vice versa. The appeal of this genre lies in the addition of Pop melodies that, when combined with riffs typical of Rock, create a combination that is classified as Pop/Rock, but where the former predominates in terms of general themes."

Somos by Jarabe de Palo was the first album to be nominated for this category and for Album of the Year. They have been followed by the albums Algo Sucede by Julieta Venegas, Mis Planes Son Amarte by Juanes, Cargar la Suerte by Andrés Calamaro, La Conquista del Espacio by Fito Paez and Vida Cotidiana by Juanes.

Colombian musician Juanes is the most awarded artist with four wins, all the times he's been nominated for.

== Recipients ==
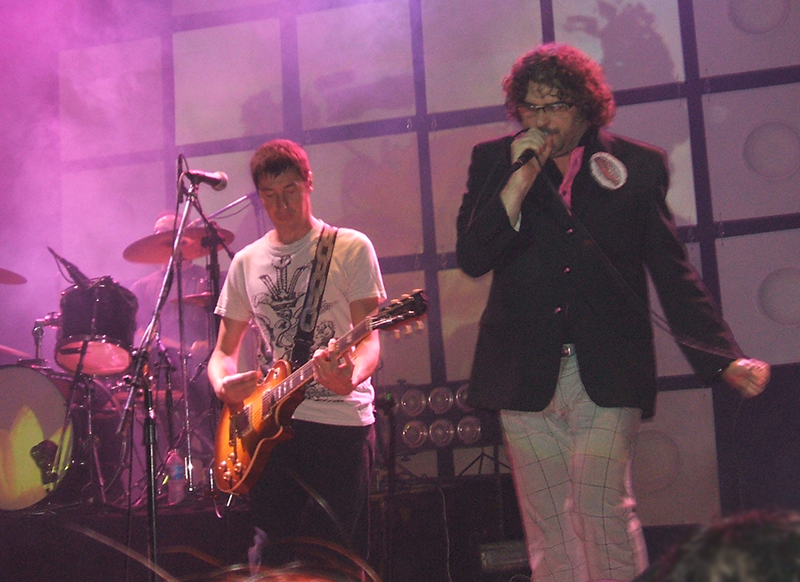
Inaugural winners, Uruguayan band El Cuarteto de Nos.

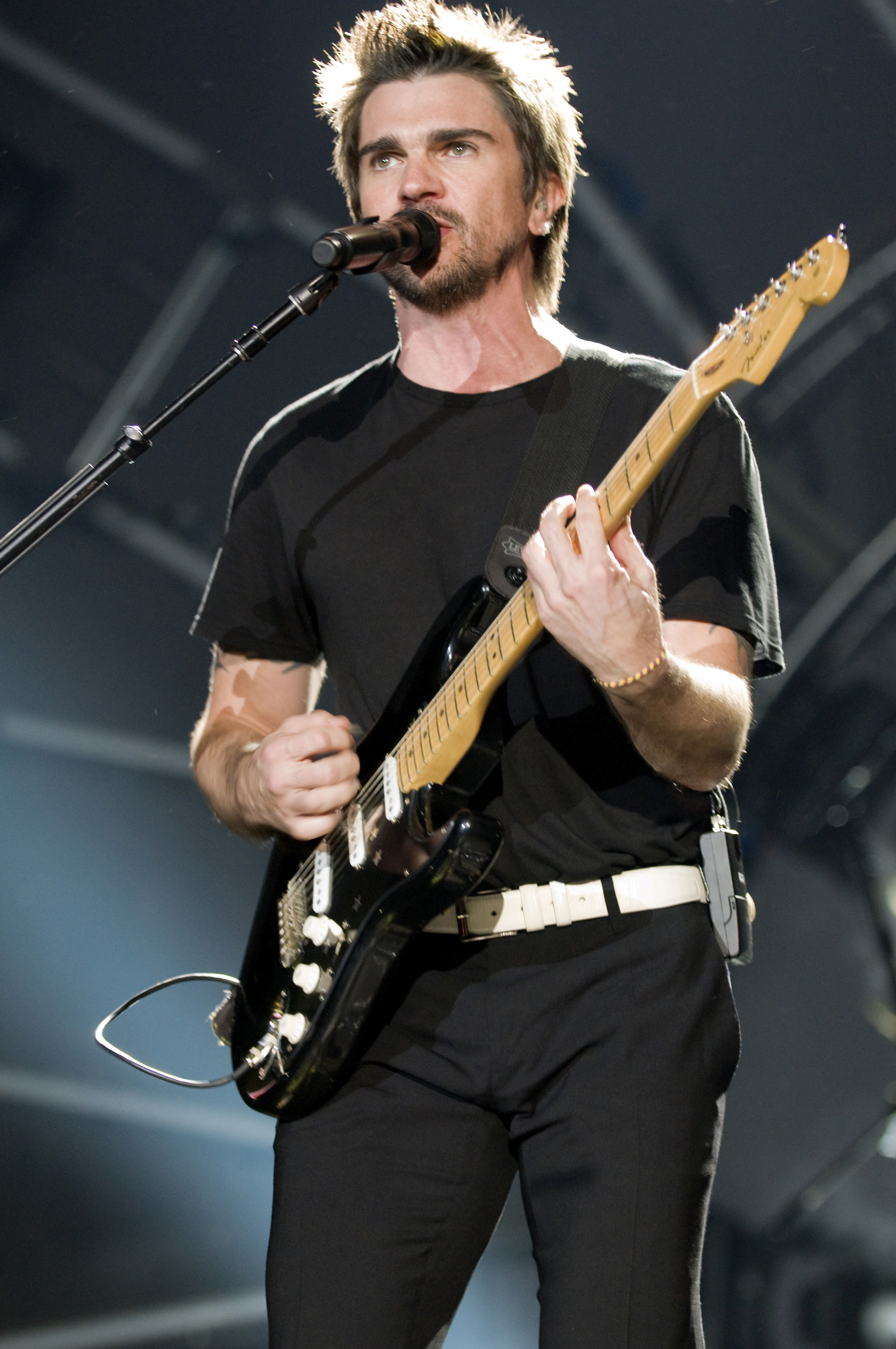
Colombian singer Juanes has won this award five times, for Loco de Amor in 2014, Mis Planes son Amarte in 2017, Origen in 2021, Vida Cotidiana in 2023 and Juanesteban in 2026.

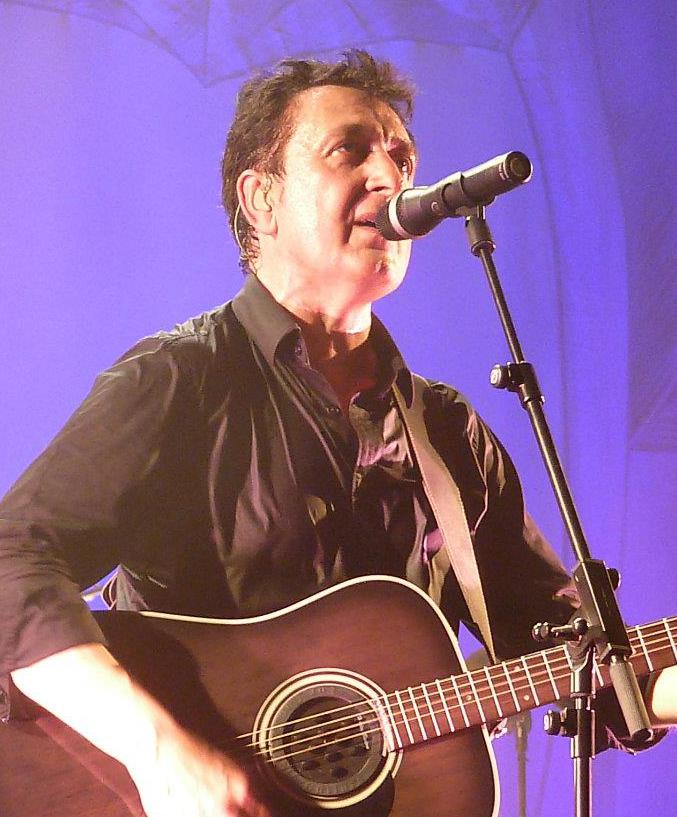
2018 winner Manolo García.

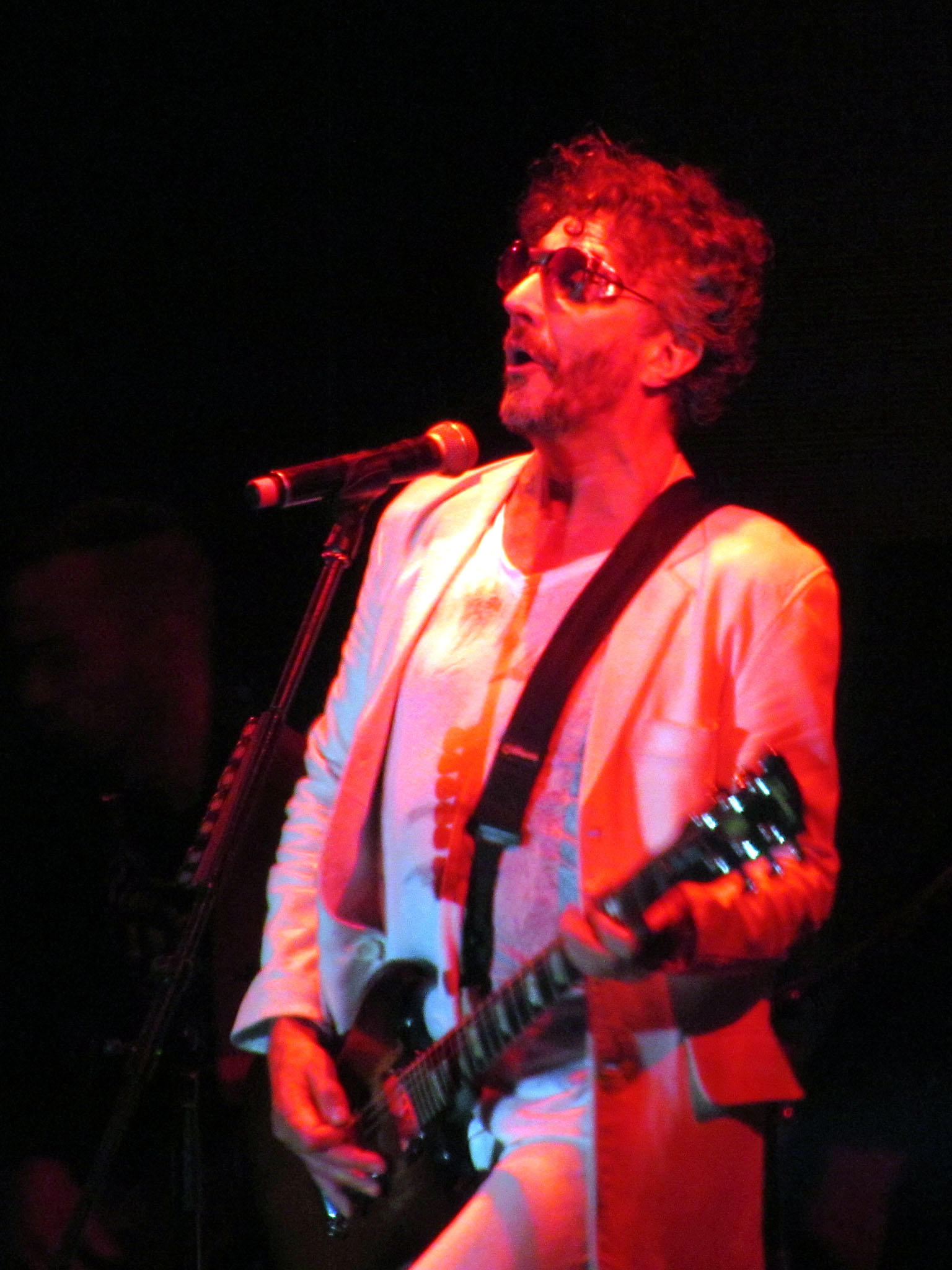
Argentine singer Fito Páez has won twice, in 2020 for La Conquista del Espacio and in 2022 for Los Años Salvajes.

Year	Performing artist(s)	Work	Nominees	Ref.
2012	El Cuarteto de Nos	Porfiado	Jotdog – Turista de Amor; Leiva – Diciembre; Los Claxons – Camino A Encontrarte; Vega – La Cuenta Atrás	
2013	Beto Cuevas	Transformación	Black Guayaba – La Conexión; DLD – Primario; Tan Biónica – Destinología; Tren a Marte – Tercera Llamada; Vicentico – Vicentico 5	
2014	Juanes	Loco de Amor	Airbag – Libertad; Elefantes – El Rinoceronte; Jarabe de Palo – Somos; Vega – Wolverines	
2015	Maná	Cama Incendiada	El Cuarteto de Nos – Habla Tu Espejo; Mikel Erentxun – Corazones; Manolo García – Todo Es Ahora; Camila Luna – Flamboyán; Moderatto – Malditos Pecadores	
2016	Julieta Venegas	Algo Sucede	Caramelos de Cianuro – 8; Jotdog – Universos Paralelos; La Santa Cecilia – Buenaventura; Meteoros – Meteoros	
2017	Juanes	Mis Planes son Amarte	Mikel Erentxun – El Hombre Sin Sombra; Jarabe de Palo – 50 Palos; Miranda! – Fuerte; Joaquín Sabina – Lo Niego Todo	
2018	Manolo García	Geometría del Rayo	Bambi – El Encuentro; Comisario Pantera – Cosmovisiones; Ella Es Tan Cargosa – La Sangre Buena; Lucas & The Woods – Pensacola Radio	
2019	Andrés Calamaro	Cargar la Suerte	Jumbo – Manual de Viaje A Un Lugar Lejano; David Lebón – Lebón & Co.; Leiva – Nuclear; Taburete – Madam Ayahuasca	
2020	Fito Paez	La Conquista del Espacio	Gina Chavez – La Que Manda; Conociendo Rusia – Cabildo y Juramento; Juan Galeano – Abracadabra; Los Mesoneros – Pangea	
2021	Juanes	Origen	Diamante Eléctrico – Mira Lo Que Me Hiciste Hacer; Adan Jodorowsky & The French Kiss – Mis Grandes Éxitos; Love of Lesbian – V. E. H. N.; Rayos Laser – El Reflejo	
2022	Fito Paez	Los Años Salvajes	Babasónicos – Trinchera; Bruses – Monstruos; Conociendo Rusia – La Dirección; Vetusta Morla – Cable a Tierra	
2023	Juanes	Vida Cotidiana	Alex Anwandter – El Diablo en el Cuerpo; Babasónicos – Trinchera Avanzada; León Gieco – El Hombrecito del Mar; Usted Señálemelo – Tripolar; Juan Pablo Vega – Despídeme de Todxs	
2024	Draco Rosa	Reflejos de lo Eterno	Bruses – Cuando Ella Me Besó Probé a Dios; Conociendo Rusia – Jet Love; Jay de la Cueva – Jay de la Cueva; Francisca Valenzuela – Adentro	
2025	Morat	Ya Es Mañana	Bandalos Chinos – Vándalos; Diamante Eléctrico – Malhablado; Lasso – Malcriado; Dani Martín – El Último Día de Nuestras Vidas; RENEE – R	
2026	Juanes	Juanesteban	Emmanuel Horvilleur – Mi Año Gótico; La Vida Bohème – Tierra de Nadie; Draco Rosa – Olas de Luz; Usted Señalemelo – Términos & Condiciones	
