= Santiago Cruz =

Santiago Cruz Vélez
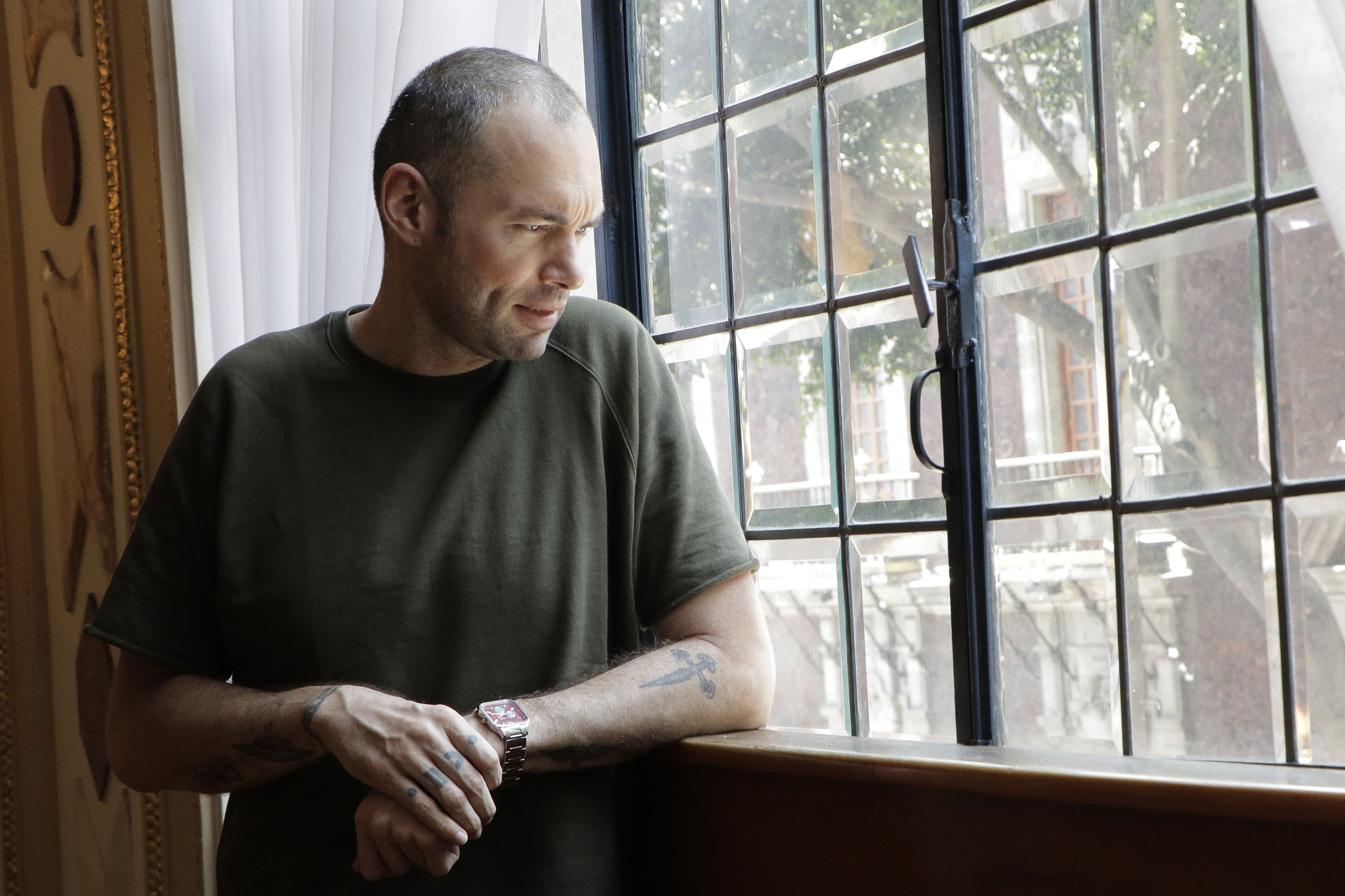
- Born: 1 February 1976 (age 49); Ibagué, Tolima, Colombia
- Occupations: Singer; songwriter
- Years active: 1993–present
- Spouse: María Paz Mateus
- Musical career
- Genres: Ballad; pop
- Instruments: Vocals; guitar
- Labels: Sony Music
- Website: www.santiagocruz.net

Santiago Cruz Vélez (born 1 February 1976) is a Colombian singer and songwriter.

== Early life ==
Cruz was born on 1 February 1976 in Ibagué, Colombia, the Colombian musical capital. He was raised by his mother, his two grandmothers and 10 aunts. After 17 years of living in his hometown and having spent his adolescence in the middle of study and military service, Santiago moved to the Colombian capital to study "Finance and International Relations." Despite that, Cruz always knew that he would dedicate himself completely to music, because it was one of his great passions.

== Career ==
In 2003, Cruz released his first album titled Solo hasta hoy. The single "Una y otra vez" made him known in the field of music. This album has also let him get acquainted with and share the same stage with a great many famous musicians such as Alejandro Sanz, Miguel Bosé, and Franco de Vita.

In 2006, Cruz released his second album, Sentidos, under the independent label "Equilibrio Producciones". This album was produced together with music producer Julián Ávila and concert producer Fredy Ardila.

In 2009, Cruz released his third album, Cruce de caminos, under the label Sony Music. He described songs of this album as coming from his soul.

In 2012, Cruz presented his fourth album, A quien corresponda. This album includes 13 songs, whose composition were developed during the concerts and trips for his previous album.

After several months of work, a long trip to Spain and many compositions, Cruz returned with his fifth studio album, Equilibrio, in 2014, which went on sale in digital and physical formats on September 23 in Colombia and several countries in Latin America. The physical album contains 13 songs and a Bonus track recorded live with piano and voice in an exclusive jazz venue in Valencia. Electric guitars play a greater role in this album, along with an energy that leads us towards a more British sound, according to Nacho Mañó, the person who produced this album. The name of this album, according to Cruz, comes from the label, "Equilibrio Producciones", which he created when he was an independent artist.

In 2017, Cruz released the album Trenes, aviones y viajes interplanetarios together with Elsa y Elmar and Pedro CapÃ³. This album received a Latin Grammy nomination in the “Best Singer-Songwriter Album” category. The single “Contar hasta 3, O hasta 10“ was included in this album, which shed light on women's rights and the feminist movement.

In 2019, Cruz released his album Elementales. Together with the release, Cruz presented his most recent single "Baja la Guardia", one of his most powerful songs, produced by Cachorro López and accompanied by Andrés Cepeda.

== Humanitarian work ==
In 2011, Cruz was appointed by the United Nations Development Program (UNDP) representative in Colombia, Bruno Moro, as Goodwill Ambassador for UNDP. His first working experience with UNDP began in October 2010 at a Bogota peacebuilding festival called Expopaz. After this appointment, Cruz's new duties would include combating poverty and violence against women “in a permanent call for peace and reconciliation among Colombians.”

== Discography ==
=== Studio albums ===
- 2003: Solo hasta hoy
- 2006: Sentidos
- 2009: Cruce de caminos
- 2012: A quien corresponda
- 2014: Equilibrio
- 2017: Trenes, aviones y viajes interplanetarios
- 2019: Elementales
- 2021: Dale
- 2023: Nueve

== Awards and nominations ==
Latin Grammy Award
Year	Nominee / Work	Award	Result	Ref.
2010	Cruce de caminos	Best Singer-Songwriter Album	Nominated	
2013	"Desde Lejos"	Record of the Year	Nominated	
2015	Equilibrio	Best Singer-Songwriter Album	Nominated	
2023	Nueve	Best Singer-Songwriter Album	Pending	
2023	"1.200 Kilómetros"	Best Singer-Songwriter Song	Pending	
