= Mis planes son amarte =

Mis Planes Son Amarte

Studio album by Juanes
- Released: May 12, 2017
- Genre: Latin pop
- Length: 37:53
- Label: Universal Music Latin

Juanes chronology
Loco de Amor (2014)	Mis Planes Son Amarte (2017)	Más futuro que pasado (2019)

Singles from Mis planes son amarte
- 1. "Fuego" Released: October 7, 2016; 2. "Hermosa Ingrata" Released: January 27, 2017

Mis Planes Son Amarte (English: My Plans Are to Love You) is the seventh studio album by Colombian recording artist Juanes.

The album won Latin Grammy Award for Best Pop/Rock Album at the 18th Annual Latin Grammy Awards. It was released as a visual album, with an accompanying film released as a music video for every track on YouTube. The album tells the story of "a Colombian astronaut who time travels to find true and eternal love." It also features Juanes's first song in English, "Goodbye for Now".

== Reception ==
In a 5-star review, AllMusic praised the album and wrote that it "not only breaks ground on every aesthetic frontier, but results in the finest outing in Juanes' career to date." RollingStone gave the album 4 stars, writing "Juanes shows how it's possible to touch the stars with your feet planted firmly on the earth."

Professional ratings
Review scores
Source	Rating
AllMusic	5/5 stars
RollingStone	4/5 stars

== Track listing ==
No.	Title	Length
1.	"Perro Viejo (Old Dog)"	3:16
2.	"Ángel (Angel)"	3:53
3.	"Fuego (Fire)"	2:47
4.	"Alguna Vez (Sometime)"	2:59
5.	"El Ratico (Our Time)"	2:46
6.	"Hermosa Ingrata (Beautiful Ingrate)"	3:01
7.	"Bendecido (Blessed)"	3:38
8.	"Es Tarde (It's Late)"	3:29
9.	"Actitud (Attitude)"	3:06
10.	"Mis Planes Son Amarte (My Plans Are to Love You)"	3:30
11.	"Goodbye for Now"	2:47
12.	"Esto No Acaba (This Isn't Over)"	2:41

== Charts ==
=== Weekly charts ===
Chart (2017)	Peak position
Argentinian Albums (Prensario)	6
Spanish Albums (Promusicae)	12
Top South American Albums (Prensario)	10
US Billboard 200	77
US Top Latin Albums (Billboard)	1
US Latin Pop Albums (Billboard)	1

=== Year-end charts ===
Chart (2017)	Position
US Top Latin Albums (Billboard)	53
Chart (2018)	Position
US Top Latin Albums (Billboard)	95

== Certifications ==
Region	Certification	Certified units/sales
Colombia (ASINCOL)	4× Platinum	
Ecuador	Gold	
Mexico (AMPROFON)	Gold	30,000^{‡}
Peru	Gold	
^{‡} Sales+streaming figures based on certification alone.
