= Ekhymosis =

Colombian rock band formed in 1988

- Also known as: EKHYMOSIS
- Origin: Medellín, Colombia
- Genres: Thrash metal (previously); heavy metal (previously); metalcore; rock en español (recently and present)
- Years active: 1988–1997; 2012–present
- Label: Independent
- Members: Julian Orrego; James Agudelo; Mauricio Estrada; Diego Gomez; David Sanchez
- Past members: Juan Esteban Aristizabal; Alex Oquendo; Felipe Zarate; Felipe Martinez; Fernando Tobón; Alejandro Ochoa; José David Lopera; Santiago Giraldo; Santiago Mora; Oscar Osorio; Diego Vargas; Fernando Andrés García; Felipe Manrique; Luis Duqueiro Quintero
- Website: ekhymosisrock.com

Ekhymosis are a Colombian rock band formed by Juan Esteban "Juanes" Aristizábal Vásquez and Fernando Andrés García Celis from Medellín. The band was created in 1988 with heavy influences from Metallica and other important metal acts of the 80s, as well as some popular Latino music.

== Career ==
Even since their beginning as a metal band, Ekhymosis (Ancient Greek: ἐκχύμωσις ecchymosis, 'bruise') showed the same pro-Latino lyrics as Kraken. After some live performances to become known in their city (and more regions of Colombia), the band recorded a demo of two songs, which described the violence in Medellín and the injustice of innocent deaths and other problems in Colombia. The demo sold out (thanks to friends and family of the band), and they decided to record a second. This time Ekhymosis had luck: In the studio was a Codiscos representative; she heard and liked the demo and the band signed with that label.

In september 18th of 1992 saw the release of Niño Gigante, a heavy metal album that included one of the band's most well known songs, "Solo". Controversy and the term "sell-out" surrounded the band with their next release: 1994's Ciudad Pacífico, produced by Federico López, a more hard rock-oriented record with more Latin sounds. Ekhymosis was looking for their unique sound; they didn't want to be the "Spanish Metallica". Rather, they wanted to create Colombian rock.

In the following year, 1995, released Amor Bilingüe, topping the Colombian charts with the single "De Madrugada". The video of the song had incredible replay value on MTV Latino. The same year, Ekhymosis recorded a rock version of the National Anthem of Colombia, which caused controversy among some, but was well received among Colombian youth. Ekhymosis was the chosen band to open for Bon Jovi in November of that year, but due to the murder of the politician Alvaro Gómez the band decided not to play in order to allow the concert to finish earlier.

The next year, the band released their unplugged album, titled Acústico, and Ekhymosis decided to go to Los Angeles where they played in local pubs and began recording their new album. In 1996, the band, now with four members (Juan Esteban, Andrés, Toby and José) recorded in L.A. their self-titled album, which saw the re-makes of three of their best songs ("Solo", "Sin Rencores", "De Madrugada") and new ones, the most remarkable being "La Tierra", known by some fans as "the second Colombian Anthem". The band was at its peak, but little knew the fans that those were the last days of one of the most important bands in Colombia.

In 1997, Ekhymosis won 3 Shock Awards (Best National Group, Best Song for "La Tierra", and Best Composer for Juan Esteban). Some months later, due to internal problems in deciding the future of the band, Ekhymosis disbanded. Juan Esteban, then, began his solo career as Juanes; the drummer of the band, Jose Lopera, worked with him on his first album, and has continued to work with Juanes to this day; the guitarist of Ekhymosis, Toby, started to play with Juanes on his second album and has continued with Juanes as well. Juanes has been known to perform Ekhymosis songs at his concerts, namely "Solo" and "La Tierra".

== A new era ==
In 2012, the band announced a rebirth with new members, in a rendition to their origins as a thrash metal band, and playing their early songs before 1994. This lineup also included the only remaining member since its beginnings, bassist and former lead guitarist Andrés García. The other members of this new phase of the band were: Santiago Giraldo on lead vocals (2012–2014), Santiago Mora on lead guitar (2012–2015), Diego Vargas on rhythm guitar (2013), Oscar Osorio (2012–2013; 2015-2017), and Mauricio Estrada on drums and like the executive director, who has remained in the band to this day (2012–present). With this lineup they recorded the single Justicia Negra, which was very well received by critics and the metal audience. Later, Luis Duqueiro Quintero joined to replace Santiago Giraldo on lead vocals, and Felipe Manrique replaced Santiago Mora on lead guitar. This lineup recorded the album Paz Con Cadenas, released in 2016 under the Codiscos record label and with this formation they released the single “Heridas Eternas" too. In 2017, guitarist James Agudelo joined to replace Oscar Osorio, in 2020 with Daniel Zapata on the lead vocals the band started a new phase recording a series of singles releases since 2020 until 2024. khymosis is one of the fundamental bands in the evolution of Colombian rock. From its beginnings, the group has built a sound in constant transformation, driven by musical exploration and the individual influences of each of its members.

Throughout its trajectory, Ekhymosis has moved through different sonic stages, consolidating an identity that combines strength, depth, and creative pursuit. Their proposal redefines the concept of national rock song after song, maintaining a forward-looking vision without losing the essence that made them a reference point for the genre in Colombia. More than a band, Ekhymosis represents a continuous evolution within the Latin American rock landscape."

== Members ==
=== Current members ===
- Julián Orrego - Voice (2024-present)
- Mauricio Estrada – drums (2012–present)
- Diego Gómez - Keyboards (2022-present)
- James Agudelo – rhythm guitar (2018–present)
- David Sanchez - Bass (2024-present)

=== Past members ===
- Juan Esteban Aristizábal – vocals (1990–1997), rhythm guitar (1988–1997)
- Alex Oquendo – vocals (1988)
- Toto Lalinde – vocals (1989)
- Esteban Mora – drums (1988–1993)
- José Lopera – drums (1994–1997)
- Felipe Martínez – percussion (1994–1996)
- Felipe Zárate – bass (1988–1989)
- José Uribe – lead guitar (1990–1993)
- Fernando "Toby" Tobón – lead guitar (1994–1997)
- Alejandro Ochoa – keyboards (1992–1996)
- Santiago Giraldo – vocals (2012–2014)
- Santiago Mora – lead guitar (2012–2015)
- Oscar Osorio – rhythm guitar (2012–2013, 2015–2017)
- Diego Vargas – rhythm guitar (2013)

=== Featured members ===
- Jorge Vargas – percussion
- Felipe Alzate – percussion
- Andrés Múnera – keyboards

== Discography ==
=== Albums ===
Year	Album
1988	Nunca Nada Nuevo (demo tape)
1989	Desde Arriba Es Diferente (7-inch EP)
1992	De Rodillas (12-inch EP)
1993	Niño Gigante
1994	Ciudad Pacífico
1995	Amor Bilingüe
1996	Unplugged (Acústico)
1997	Ekhymosis
2016	Despertar (Single)
2016	Paz con Cadenas

=== Singles ===
Year	Single
2019	"Heridas Eternas"
2020	"Condenado"
2023	"Falsos Positivos"
2023	"Rotos Por La Guerra"
2023	"Desigualdad"
2024	"Somos Mas"
2024	"Impermanencia"
