= Vida Cotidiana =

Studio album by Juanes
- Released: May 19, 2023
- Genre: Latin pop
- Length: 35:31
- Language: Spanish
- Label: Universal Music Latino
- Producer: Juanes; Sebastian Krys; Emmanuel Briceño

Juanes chronology
Origen (2021)	Vida Cotidiana (2023)

Vida Cotidiana (transl. Everyday Life), is the tenth studio album by Colombian musician Juanes. It was released on May 19, 2023, through Universal Music Latino. A deluxe version with two bonus tracks was released on September 29, 2023.

The album marks a return to his rock roots after his two previous original albums experimented with new genres. Juanes told Rolling Stone, "I realized I needed to go back to my natural way of making music. This is who I am."

== Background ==
Vida Cotidiana was written during the COVID-19 pandemic, which Juanes stated helped to connect him with the reality of his home. The majority of the album reflects on Juanes' relationship with his wife and children: accustomed to spending long periods of time away from home due to his career, Juanes was living with his family 24 hours a day for the first time due to the COVID-19 lockdowns. He also used the time to take virtual lessons, studying guitar with Tomo Fujita from Berklee College of Music, harmony with Guillermo Vadalá, singing with vocal coach Eric Vetro, and poetry with Alexis Díaz Pimienta.

== Critical reception ==
Ernesto Lechner of Rolling Stone described the album as "unique and inspiring," calling it "Juanes' most sincere effort to date."

=== Accolades ===
List of awards and nominations received by Vida Cotidiana
Year	Award	Category	Result	Ref.
2023	Rolling Stone en Español Awards	Album of the Year	Nominated	
2023	Rolling Stone en Español Awards	Video of the Year ("Canción Desaparecida")	Nominated	
2023	Latin Grammy Awards	Album of the Year	Nominated	
2023	Latin Grammy Awards	Best Pop/Rock Album	Won	
2023	Latin Grammy Awards	Best Rock Song ("Gris")	Nominated	
2024	Grammy Awards	Best Latin Rock or Alternative Album	Won	

== Track listing ==
Vida Cotidiana — Standard version
No.	Title	Writer(s)	Length
1.	"Mayo"	Juanes, Alexis Díaz Pimienta	3:35
2.	"Veneno"	Juanes, Emmanuel Briceño Vera	3:09
3.	"Más"	Juanes, Tommy Torres	3:52
4.	"Canción Desaparecida (feat. Mabiland)"	Juanes, Juan Mosquera, Mabiland	2:50
5.	"Ojalá"	Juanes, GALE, Guillermo Vadalá	3:13
6.	"Cecilia (feat. Juan Luis Guerra)"	Juanes, Emmanuel Briceño Vera	3:28
7.	"Gris"	Juanes	3:09
8.	"Amores Prohibidos"	Juanes, Alexis Díaz Pimienta	3:15
9.	"Vida Cotidiana"	Juanes, Alexis Díaz Pimienta, Emmanuel Briceño Vera	3:02
10.	"El Abrazo"	Juanes, Tommy Torres	3:06
11.	"Vuelo"	Juanes, Juan Luis Guerra	2:46
Total length:			35:31

Vida Cotidiana — Deluxe version
No.	Title	Writer(s)	Length
12.	"Semilla"	Juanes, Alexis Díaz Pimienta, Emmanuel Briceño Vera	3:16
13.	"La Versión En Mi Cabeza"	Joaquina Blavia	3:13
Total length:			42:00
