= Arranca =

2023 single by Becky G

Single by Becky G featuring Omega
- Language: Spanish
- Released: March 10, 2023
- Genre: Merengue; hip hop; R&B
- Length: 2:46
- Label: Kemosabe; RCA
- Composers: Rafael Rodriguez; Daniel Ignacio Rondon; Henry Durham; Alexander Castillo Vasquez
- Lyricists: Rebbeca Marie Gomez; Manuel Lorente Freire; Elena Rose; Antonio Peter De La Rosa
- Producers: HoneyBoos; A.C; Polo Parra

Becky G singles chronology
| "Te Quiero Besar" (2023) | "Arranca" (2023) | "Chanel" (2023) |

Omega singles chronology
| "Mi Pecadora" (2023) | "Arranca" (2023) | "Loca Te Pones" (2023) |

Music video
- "Arranca" on YouTube

"Arranca" is a song recorded by American singer Becky G featuring Dominican singer Omega. It was released by Kemosabe and RCA Records on March 10, 2023.

== Music video ==
The music video was released alongside the song on March 10. The music video was directed by Karla Read and shot in Boca Chica, Dominican Republic.

== Live performances ==
Gomez performed the song live for the first time at the Coachella 2023 on April 14, 2023. On August 25, Gomez made a performance for Today, which was broadcast live from Rockefeller Center in New York City.

== Accolades ==
Awards and nominations for "Arranca"
| Organization | Year | Category | Result | Ref. |
|---|---|---|---|---|
| Latin American Music Awards | 2024 | Best Collaboration - Urban | Nominated | |
| Latin Grammy Awards | 2023 | Songwriter of the Year (Note: Awards and nominations Elena Rose and Manuel Lorente Freire has received as songwriter.) | Nominated | |
| LOS40 Music Awards | 2023 | Best Collaboration | Nominated | |
| Premios Juventud | 2024 | Best Pop/Urban Collaboration | Nominated | |
| Premios Tu Música Urbano | 2023 | Urban Tropical Song | Nominated | |

== Track listings ==
- Digital download
1. "Arranca" (feat. Omega) – 2:46
- Remixes EP
1. "Arranca" (Sam Feldt Remix; feat. Omega) – 2:39
2. "Arranca" (Ape Drums Remix; feat Omega) – 2:49
3. "Arranca" - (Lavern Remix; feat. Omega) – 2:36
4. "Arranca" - (TV Noise Remix; feat. Omega) – 2:20
5. "Arranca" - (Mikey Barreneche Remix; feat. Omega) – 2:29

== Credits and personnel ==
Credits adapted from AllMusic.

- Becky G – writer, main artist, lead vocals, background vocals
- Omega – writer, featured vocals
- Elena Rose – writer
- Manuel Lorente Freire – writer
- Rafael Rodriguez – writer
- Daniel Ignacio Rondon – writer
- Alexander Castillo Vasquez – writer, producer
- Moon Willis – writer, producer
- Polo Parra – producer
- HoneyBoos – producer
- Nicky Catarey – percussion

== Charts ==
=== Weekly charts ===
Weekly chart performance for "Arranca"
| Chart (2023) | Peak position |
|---|---|
| Belgium (Ultratop 50 Flanders) | 8 |
| Belgium (Ultratop 50 Wallonia) | 23 |
| El Salvador (Monitor Latino) | 14 |
| France (Billboard) | 17 |
| France (SNEP) | 17 |
| Netherlands (Billboard) | 11 |
| Netherlands (Dutch Top 40) | 9 |
| Netherlands (Single Top 100) | 12 |
| Panama (PRODUCE) | 21 |
| Puerto Rico (Monitor Latino) | 18 |
| Spain (Billboard) | 22 |
| Spain (Promusicae) | 24 |
| Spain Airplay (TopHit) | 18 |
| US Latin Airplay (Billboard) | 14 |
| US Latin Rhythm Airplay (Billboard) | 5 |
| US Tropical Airplay (Billboard) | 4 |

=== Year-end charts ===
Year-end chart performance for "Arranca"
| Chart (2023) | Position |
|---|---|
| Belgium (Ultratop 50 Flanders) | 48 |
| Belgium (Ultratop 50 Wallonia) | 98 |
| Netherlands (Dutch Top 40) | 43 |
| Netherlands (Single Top 100) | 66 |
| US Latin Rhythm Airplay (Billboard) | 27 |

== Certifications ==
Certifications for "Arranca"
| Region | Certification | Certified units/sales |
|---|---|---|
| Belgium (BRMA) | Gold | 20,000^{‡} |
| France (SNEP) | Diamond | 333,333^{‡} |
| Mexico (AMPROFON) | Gold | 70,000^{‡} |
| Spain (Promusicae) | 2× Platinum | 120,000^{‡} |
^{‡} Sales+streaming figures based on certification alone.

== Release history ==
Release dates and formats for "Arranca"
| Region | Date | Format | Version | Label | Ref. |
|---|---|---|---|---|---|
| Various | March 10, 2023 | Digital download; streaming | Original | Kemosabe; RCA | |
| Various | July 28, 2023 | Digital download | Remixes | Kemosabe; RCA | |
