= Latin Grammy Award for Best Portuguese-Language Urban Performance =

Music award category

- Awarded for: quality vocal or instrumental urban music singles or tracks in Portuguese language
- Country: United States
- Presented by: The Latin Recording Academy
- Currently held by: Liniker for "Caju" (2025)
- Website: latingrammy.com

The Latin Grammy Award for Best Portuguese-Language Urban Performance is an award presented annually by the Latin Academy of Recording Arts & Sciences at the Latin Grammy Awards.

The description of the category at the 2023 Latin Grammy Awards states that it is for "commercially released singles or tracks (vocal or instrumental) of recordings in Portuguese language that contain 51% or more playing time of newly recorded material, and 51% playing time of Urban music". In regards to the genre, the song can "include a fusion mix of urban styles with other genres as long as the Urban character predominates".

The category was introduced at the 24th Annual Latin Grammy Awards in 2023, alongside two other categories (Songwriter of the Year and Best Singer-Songwriter Song).

== Recipients ==
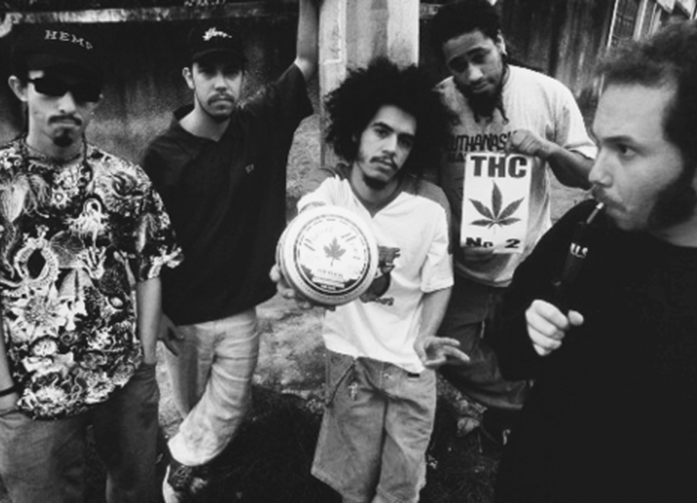
Rap rock group Planet Hemp were the inaugural winners in collaboration with rapper Criolo.

| Year | Artist | Work | Nominees | Ref. |
|---|---|---|---|---|
| 2023 | Planet Hemp featuring Criolo | "Distopia" | Àttooxxá & Carlinhos Brown – "Da Favela Pro Asfalto"; Giulia Be – "Aviso de Amigo"; IZA – "Fé"; Filipe Ret, Dallass & Caio Luccas – "Good Vibe" | |
| 2024 | Gabriel O Pensador, Lulu Santos & Xamã | "Cachimbo da Paz 2" | Anitta featuring Dennis & Pedro Sampaio – "Joga Pra Lua"; Gloria Groove featuring Ludmilla & MC GW – "Da Braba"; MC Cabelinho – "Carta Aberta"; MC Carol & IZA – "Fé nas Maluca"; Yago Oproprio featuring Patricio Sid – "La Noche" | |
| 2025 | Liniker | "Caju" | BK' & Evinha – "Só Quero Ver"; Djonga featuring Milton Nascimento – "Demoro A Dormir"; MC Hariel & Gilberto Gil – "A Dança (Ao Vivo)"; MC Tuto featuring DJ Glenner – "Barbie" | |
