= Más futuro que pasado =

Studio album by Juanes
- Released: November 22, 2019
- Length: 38:42
- Label: Universal Music Latin

Juanes chronology
Mis planes son amarte (2017)	Más futuro que pasado (2019)	Origen (2021)

Singles from Más futuro que pasado
- 1. "Pa' Dentro" Released: May 31, 2018; 2. "La Plata" Released: January 11, 2019; 3. "Querer Mejor" Released: May 24, 2019; 4. "Bonita" Released: September 5, 2019

Más futuro que pasado (transl. More future than past) is the eighth studio album by Colombian recording artist Juanes, released on November 22, 2019. The album features a fusion of pop rock and Latin American folk music, along with reggaetón and rap sounds. The album features contributions from Sebastián Yatra, Lalo Ebratt, Christian Nodal, Alessia Cara, Crudo Means Raw, and Fuego.

"Pa' Dentro" was the first single released on May 31, 2018, followed by "La Plata", "Querer Mejor", and "Bonita". Juanes told Billboard, "I took a journey through cumbia, vallenato, and guasca (traditional folk music from Antioquia) with my authentic base, elements of electric guitar, reggae, rock. I gave myself the opportunity to work with new artists that come from totally different genres and was able to create something new. I've very happy. I feel that it's a feel-good album, very bright."

== Reception ==
Professional ratings
Review scores
Source	Rating
AllMusic	4/5 stars

Thom Jurek of AllMusic called the album a "hooky, rhythm-heavy study in why Juanes remains a prime mover in the mercurial world of Latin popular music". He added that "two decades into his career, Juanes remains a musical seeker; he carefully integrates what attracts him into his own trademark style, creating a sound at once instantly recognizable and bracingly future forward." Suzy Exposito of Rolling Stone wrote that Más futuro que pasado "is a soulful celebration of the Latin folk tradition as well as Juanes' very first love: the guitar".

== Track listing ==
No.	Title	Length
1.	"Aurora"	3:05
2.	"Tequila"	2:39
3.	"Ninguna"	2:43
4.	"Mala Manera"	3:05
5.	"Bonita"	2:27
6.	"El Pueblo"	2:39
7.	"Más futuro que pasado"	3:06
8.	"Loco"	3:16
9.	"Mia Mia"	3:28
10.	"La Plata"	3:15
11.	"Pa Dentro"	3:16
12.	"Querer Mejor"	2:53
13.	"Querer Mejor" (Spanglish version)	2:50
Total length:		38:42

== Charts ==
=== Weekly charts ===
Chart performance for Más futuro que pasado
Chart (2019)	Peak position
Spanish Albums (PROMUSICAE)	48
US Top Latin Albums (Billboard)	9
US Latin Pop Albums (Billboard)	1

=== Year-end charts ===
Year-end chart performance for Más futuro que pasado
Chart (2020)	Position
US Top Latin Albums (Billboard)	85

== Certifications ==
Certifications for Más futuro que pasado
Region	Certification	Certified units/sales
Colombia (ASINCOL)	Gold	
United States (RIAA)	Gold (Latin)	30,000^{‡}
^{‡} Sales+streaming figures based on certification alone.
