= Origen (album) =

Studio album by Juanes
- Released: 28 May 2021
- Genre: Latin pop
- Length: 45:08
- Language: Spanish
- Label: Universal Music Latino
- Producer: Juanes; Sebastian Krys

Juanes chronology
Más futuro que pasado (2019)	Origen (2021)	Vida Cotidiana (2023)

Singles from Origen
- 1. "El Amor Después Del Amor" Released: 8 April 2021

Origen (transl. Origin), is the ninth studio album by Colombian musician Juanes. It was released on 28 May 2021 through Universal Music. The album is composed of twelve cover versions of songs by different artists, sung in both English and Spanish.

This album won Best Pop/Rock Album at the 22nd Annual Latin Grammy Awards and Best Latin Rock or Alternative Album at the 64th Annual Grammy Awards.

== Background and singles ==
The production of the album started in late 2019, while the recording took place in 2020. The project consisted of twelve versions of songs that influenced the childhood and teenage years of the singer, according to Juanes: "Origen is my personal tribute to several of those artists and songs that influenced me before my solo career".

The first single of the album was a cover of the 1992 song "El amor después del amor" by the Argentine singer Fito Páez. The single was released on 10 April 2021 and was performed at the Latin American Music Awards of 2021.

To accompany the album, a 51-minute documentary film, titled Juanes: Origen, was released on 28 May 2021 through Amazon Prime Video, directed by Kacho López and produced by José Tillán. It followed the singer's childhood, alongside the development of his growing interest for music and instruments, and also explained the reasoning behind the choice of each of the songs on the album.

== Track listing ==
No.	Title	Writer(s)	Original artist	Length
1.	"Rebelión"	Álvaro José Arroyo González	Joe Arroyo	3:37
2.	"Volver"	Carlos Gardel; Alfredo Le Pera	Carlos Gardel	2:47
3.	"Nuestro Juramento"	Benito de Jesús	Julio Jaramillo	3:09
4.	"La Bilirrubina"	Juan Luis Guerra	Juan Luis Guerra	3:22
5.	"Todo Hombre Es Una Historia"	Elkin Ramírez; Hugo Restrepo; Isaza; Jorge Atehortúa; Rick Posada	Kraken	5:03
6.	"El Amor Después Del Amor"	Fito Páez	Fito Páez	3:45
7.	"Could You Be Loved"	Bob Marley	Bob Marley and the Wailers	3:29
8.	"Sin Medir Distancias"	Gustavo Gutiérrez Cabello	Diomedes Díaz	3:57
9.	"No Tengo Dinero"	Alberto Aguilera Valadez	Juan Gabriel	3:31
10.	"Dancing in the Dark"	Bruce Springsteen	Bruce Springsteen	4:04
11.	"De Oro"	Fernando Echavarría	Familia André	3:10
12.	"Y Nos Dieron las Diez"	Joaquín Sabina	Joaquín Sabina	5:14
Total length:				45:08

== Charts ==
=== Weekly charts ===
Chart (2021)	Peak position
Top South American Albums (Prensario)	11
Spanish Albums (PROMUSICAE)	69
