= Made in Miami =

Studio album by Camilo Valencia, Richard Bravo
- Released: September 22, 2022
- Genre: Latin; jazz
- Label: Pier 5
- Producer: Camilo Valencia, Richard Bravo and Alex Sino

Made in Miami is a Latin jazz instrumental album by Camilo Valencia and Richard Bravo, featuring many guest musical appearances by Latin jazz artists including Arturo Sandoval, Milton Salcedo, and Luis Enrique. The album was released by Pier 5 Records on September 22, 2022, and won two awards at the 24th Annual Latin Grammy Awards: Best Instrumental Album, and Best Arrangement (for the track "Songo Bop"). Valencia was awarded the Grammy posthumously, having died on September 6, 2023, shortly before the award nominations.

== Track listing ==
No.	Title	Featuring	Length
1.	"CCU (Coronary Care Unit)"		5:03
2.	"Made in Miami"	Milton Salcedo	4:47
3.	"Hurricane Jimenez"		3:24
4.	"Misty"	Arturo Sandoval, Milton Salcedo	5:24
5.	"Songo Bop"	Milton Salcedo	4:11
6.	"Funkeando"		4:40
7.	"Papadin"		4:08
8.	"One Heart at a Time"	Milton Salcedo	4:34
9.	"Café Union"		4:23
10.	"Guanabacoa Streets"	Luis Enrique	4:35
11.	"Misty"	Jackson King, Milton Salcedo	5:24
Total length:			50:33
