= Latin Grammy Award for Best Singer-Songwriter Song =

Music award category

- Awarded for: quality vocal or instrumental singer-songwriter singles or tracks
- Country: United States
- Presented by: The Latin Recording Academy
- Currently held by: Natalia Lafourcade for "Cancionera" (2025)
- Website: latingrammy.com

The Latin Grammy Award for Best Singer-Songwriter Song is an award presented annually by the Latin Academy of Recording Arts & Sciences at the Latin Grammy Awards.

The description of the category at the 2023 Latin Grammy Awards states that it is "singles or tracks from a current singer-songwriter album currently competing in the singer-songwriter album category" and that, in order to be eligible, a song "must contain at least 51% of the lyrics in Spanish, Portuguese or any native regional dialect". The song must be new and has to be composed and performed entirely by the singer-songwriter.

The category was first awarded at the 24th Annual Latin Grammy Awards in 2023, alongside two other categories (Songwriter of the Year and Best Portuguese-Language Urban Performance) that were also introduced said year.

== Recipients ==
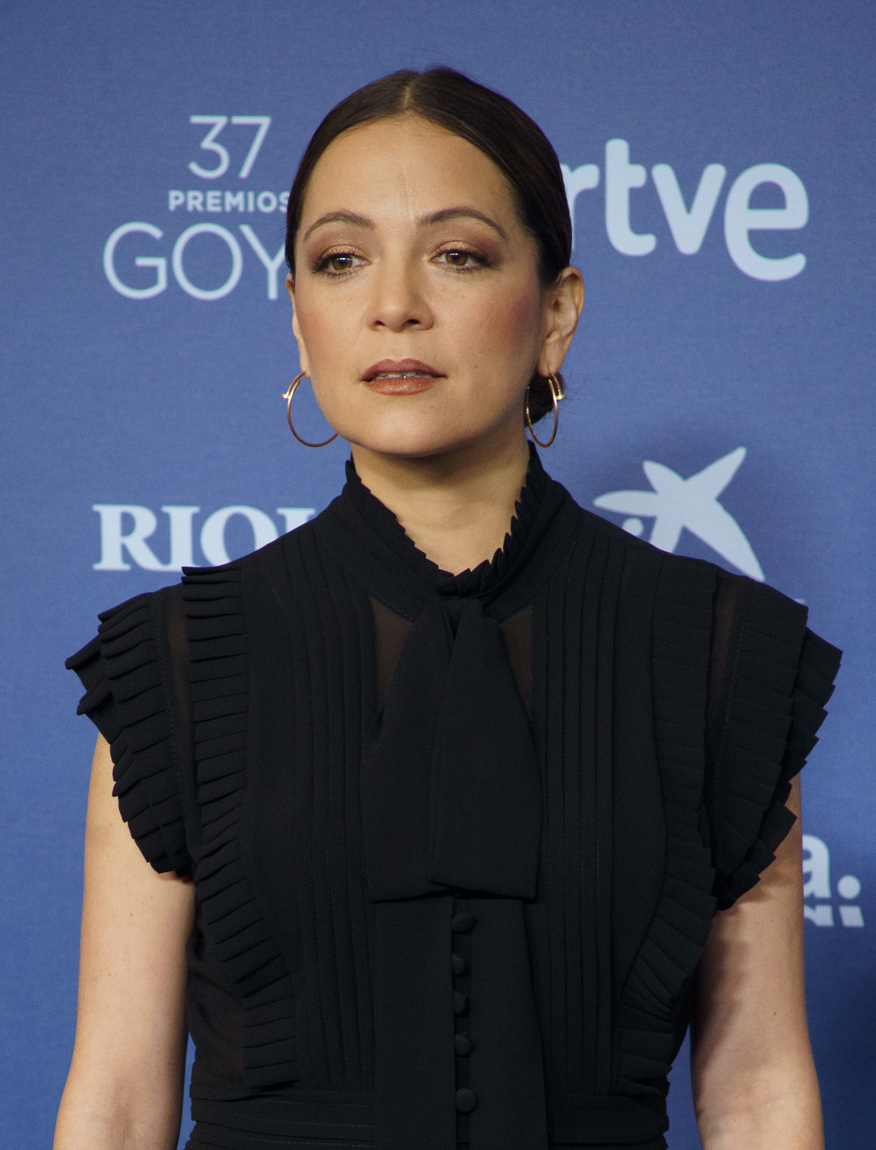
Two-time winner Natalia Lafourcade.

Year	Songwriter(s) and performing artist(s)	Work	Nominees	Ref.
2023	Natalia Lafourcade	"De Todas las Flores"	Valeria Castro – "La Raíz" (Valeria Castro); Santiago Cruz – "1.200 Kilómetros" (Santiago Cruz); Silvana Estrada – "Si Me Matan" (Silvana Estrada); Juan Carlos Pérez Soto – "Tu Historia, la Mía y la Verdad" (Juan Carlos Pérez Soto)	
2024	Jorge Drexler	"Derrumbe"	Tiago Iorc – "Antes Que O Mundo Acabe" (Tiago Iorc); Rozalén – "Entonces" (Rozalén); El David Aguilar – "Luz de Cabeza" (El David Aguilar)	
2024	Kany García	"García"	Tiago Iorc – "Antes Que O Mundo Acabe" (Tiago Iorc); Rozalén – "Entonces" (Rozalén); El David Aguilar – "Luz de Cabeza" (El David Aguilar)	
2025	Natalia Lafourcade	"Cancionera"	Joaquina – "Aeropuerto" (Joaquina); Camilú – "Amarte Sin Que Quieras Irte" (Camilú); Silvana Estrada – "Como un Pájaro" (Silvana Estrada); Vicente García – "Quisqueya" (Vicente García)	
