= Pacho Flores =

Venezuelan trumpeter (born 1981)

- Born: October 23, 1981 (age 45); San Cristóbal, Táchira
- Genres: Classical, Latin jazz
- Occupations: Soloist, composer
- Instrument: Trumpet
- Website: pachoflores.com

Francisco Alberto Flores Colmenares, known professionally as Pacho Flores, is a Venezuelan trumpeter, soloist, and composer.

== Career ==
He is an alumnus of El Sistema, where he was the principal trumpeter of the Simón Bolívar Symphony Orchestra. He has won the first prize at the Maurice André International Competition.

In May 2023, he performed with the Royal Liverpool Philharmonic under Domingo Hindoyan. They played the Tomasi Trumpet Concerto, before playing Flores' own flugelhorn concerto Albares, earning a standing ovation and twelve points from the Liverpool jury.

In June 2025, he performed his own composition, a waltz called Morocota originally composed for trumpet and guitar, with the Grant Park Symphony Orchestra under Giancarlo Guerrero.

In January 2026, he performed as soloist with the Orquesta Sinfónica de Minería. They played the Haydn Trumpet Concerto and the Concerto Venezolano by Paquito D'Rivera, which was composed for and premiered by Flores in 2019.
