= Maréh =

- Born: Federico Galvis Patiño; 1991 (age 34–35); Cali, Colombia
- Origin: Colombia
- Genres: Latin pop, reggae, jazz, bolero, bossa nova
- Occupations: Singer, songwriter
- Instruments: Vocals, guitar
- Years active: 2014–present
- Website: marehmusica.com

Federico Galvis Patiño (1991), better known by his stage name Maréh, is a Colombian singer and songwriter.

He has performed his music on stages in Colombia, Mexico, Peru, Spain, and the United States, participating in various circuits associated with the Latin American independent scene.

In 2023, he was nominated for two Latin Grammy Awards, in the categories of Best New Artist and Best Singer-Songwriter Album.

== Life ==
Maréh was born in Cali, Colombia. He is the son of philosopher Jorge Enrique Galvis and Janice Patiño, a social worker and gardener. He began his musical training at the age of nine, showing from an early age a connection to percussion and the musical traditions of the Colombian Pacific.

During his childhood and adolescence, he was exposed to a wide variety of musical genres, especially salsa, listening to artists such as Rubén Blades, Héctor Lavoe, Ismael Rivera and Buena Vista Social Club. He also showed interest in Latin American singer-songwriter music, influenced by figures like Caetano Veloso and Chico Buarque, as well as Argentine rock, especially Charly García and Fito Páez. Over time, he also incorporated contemporary musicians such as Jorge Drexler, Natalia Lafourcade, and El Kanka into his repertoire of influences.

He trained with prominent drummers from the country, and renowned musicians such as Gualajo, Hugo Candelario, Magín Díaz and Petrona Martínez. During his Anthropology studies at ICESI University, he co-founded Africali, a musical project that evolved into one of the most eclectic and well-known bands in the city.

At the age of 20, he began composing his own songs, and at 27, he independently released his first album, Amuleto.

== Discography ==
- Amuleto (2018). Includes collaborations with Monsieur Periné and Vicente García.
- Tierra de promesas (2022). Album inspired by Colombian ecosystems. It was nominated for the Latin Grammy Award in the category Best Singer-Songwriter Album.
- Cuerpo (2025)
