= Juanes =

Colombian musician (born 1972)

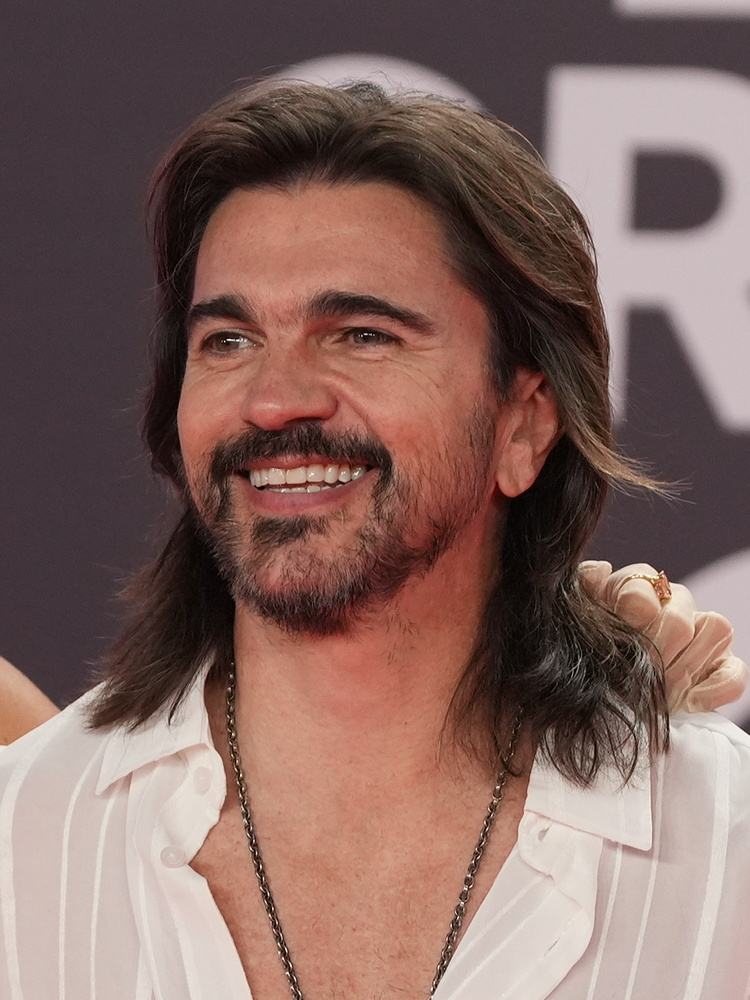
- Juanes at the 2023 Latin Grammy Awards
- Born: Juan Esteban Aristizábal Vásquez; 9 August 1972 (age 54); Medellín, Colombia
- Occupations: Singer; musician
- Years active: 1988–present
- Notable work: Discography
- Spouse: Karen Martínez (m. 2004)
- Children: 3
- Awards: Full list
- Musical career
- Genres: Latin rock; rock en español; Latin pop; cumbia
- Instruments: Vocals; guitar
- Years active: 1988–present
- Label: Universal Latino
- Formerly of: Ekhymosis
- Website: juanes.net (in Spanish and English)

Juan Esteban Aristizábal Vásquez (born 9 August 1972), known professionally as Juanes (Spanish: [ˈxwanes]), is a Colombian musician and singer, a former member of the rock band Ekhymosis. Since releasing his solo debut album Fíjate Bien in 2000, Juanes has won 26 Latin Grammy Awards and sold more than 15 million records worldwide, making him one of the best-selling Latin music artists of all time.

Born and raised in Colombia, Juanes began playing piano at age two. When Juanes was 17, he started his first band, Ekhymosis, in 1988, which went on to release eight albums, achieving recognition in his native Colombia. The track "Solo" from the album Niño Gigante in 1992 was very popular. In 1997 after the band broke up, Juanes continued solo and in 2000 he released the album Fíjate Bien which earned him three Latin Grammys. His follow-up album, Un Día Normal, was released in 2002 and was later certified platinum throughout America. Juanes' third album, Mi Sangre (2004), became an international bestseller, managing to position well in a number of countries around the world. It achieved success due to the single "La Camisa Negra".

He has since released La Vida... Es Un Ratico (2007), P.A.R.C.E. (2010), Loco de Amor (2015), Mis planes son amarte (2017), Más Futuro Que Pasado (2019), Origen (2021), and Vida Cotidiana (2023).

Juanes has won 26 Latin Grammy Awards and three Grammy Awards. He received the BMI President's Award at the 2010 BMI Latin Awards. Juanes is also known for his humanitarian work, especially with aid for Colombian victims of anti-personnel mines through his NGO Fundacion Mi Sangre. In April 2013, Juanes released an autobiography titled Chasing The Sun in which he tells his story through narratives and pictures. He is one of the best-selling Spanish-language artists.

== Early life and career ==
Juanes was born in Carolina del Príncipe, Medellín, Antioquia, Colombia. When he was seven years old, his father and brothers began to teach him how to play guitar. His passion for the instrument led him to discover simple genres of music such as traditional sounds such as tango and vallenato, as well as Russian folk music.

He grew up in Medellín during the height of drug kingpin Pablo Escobar's reign, when the city had the highest homicide rate in the world. During his childhood, Juanes witnessed a civil war in which hundreds were killed. His cousin was killed by kidnappers, and gunmen also executed a close friend. To add further to Juanes' grief and desperation, his father died from cancer. This period shaped Juanes' social consciousness, saying "Colombia has suffered so much that the only way to go forward is to imagine a better country."

As a teenager, Juanes was greatly influenced by rock and metal acts such as The Beatles and Metallica. He started the rock band Ekhymosis in 1988, and it released its debut album, Niño Gigante, that same year. The band released seven studio albums during its career and shared the stage with acts including Alejandro Sanz, Aterciopelados, and Ricky Martin; however in Juanes' words, the band "couldn't get out of Colombia" and remained "very local and confined to the Colombian market." Juanes disbanded the group in 1998 so that he could pursue a solo career.

== Solo career ==
=== 2000–03: Fíjate Bien and Un Día Normal ===
In 2000, Juanes released his solo debut Fíjate Bien (Take a Good Look), produced by Gustavo Santaolalla. The album fared well in Colombia, spending ten weeks at the number one position, but was unsuccessful in other countries. The album earned him three Latin Grammys for Best New Artist, Best Rock Solo Vocal Album, and Best Rock Song, and Juanes performed at the award show. Later that night, Juanes brought demos for over forty new songs to Santaolalla's studio, ready to begin work on another album.

The follow-up, Un Día Normal (A Normal Day), also produced by Gustavo Santaolalla who signed him with his first solo album, was released in 2002 and was highly successful in America. The album was certified gold in Colombia during its first day of sales and was certified platinum and multi-platinum in countries including Colombia, Mexico, and Spain. The album spent 92 weeks in the top ten of Billboard's Top Albums chart, setting a new record, and spent a total of two years on the chart. The album was released after the eligibility deadlines for the 2002 Latin Grammy Awards, but the advance airdate for the lead single, "A Dios le Pido" ("To God I Pray"), allowed it to be nominated for three awards and win Best Rock Song.

"A Dios le Pido" topped the singles charts of twelve countries and spent 47 consecutive weeks on the Billboard Hot Latin Tracks. The album also featured "Fotografía" ("Photograph"), a duet with Portuguese Canadian pop singer Nelly Furtado about the isolation between lovers. Juanes later worked with Furtado on a remix of "Powerless (Say What You Want)", the lead single from her 2003 album Folklore, and on "Te busqué" ("I Looked for You"), a single from her 2006 album Loose. Juanes won the most awards at the 2003 Latin Grammy Awards, where he won each of the 5 awards for which he had been nominated, including Song of the Year, Record of the Year, and Album of the Year.

=== 2006–07: Mi Sangre ===
Mi Sangre (My Blood), was released in September 2004 and debuted at number one on the Billboard Top Latin Albums. The album produced three consecutive number one singles, which held the top chart position for a combined 6 months. The album's third single, "La Camisa Negra" ("The Black Shirt"), was used in Italy in support of neo-fascism by relating it to the uniform used under the regime of Benito Mussolini. In response, left-wing media network Indymedia called for a boycott of the song. Juanes later stated that "'La Camisa Negra' has got nothing to do with fascism or Mussolini... People can interpret music in all kinds of ways I guess."

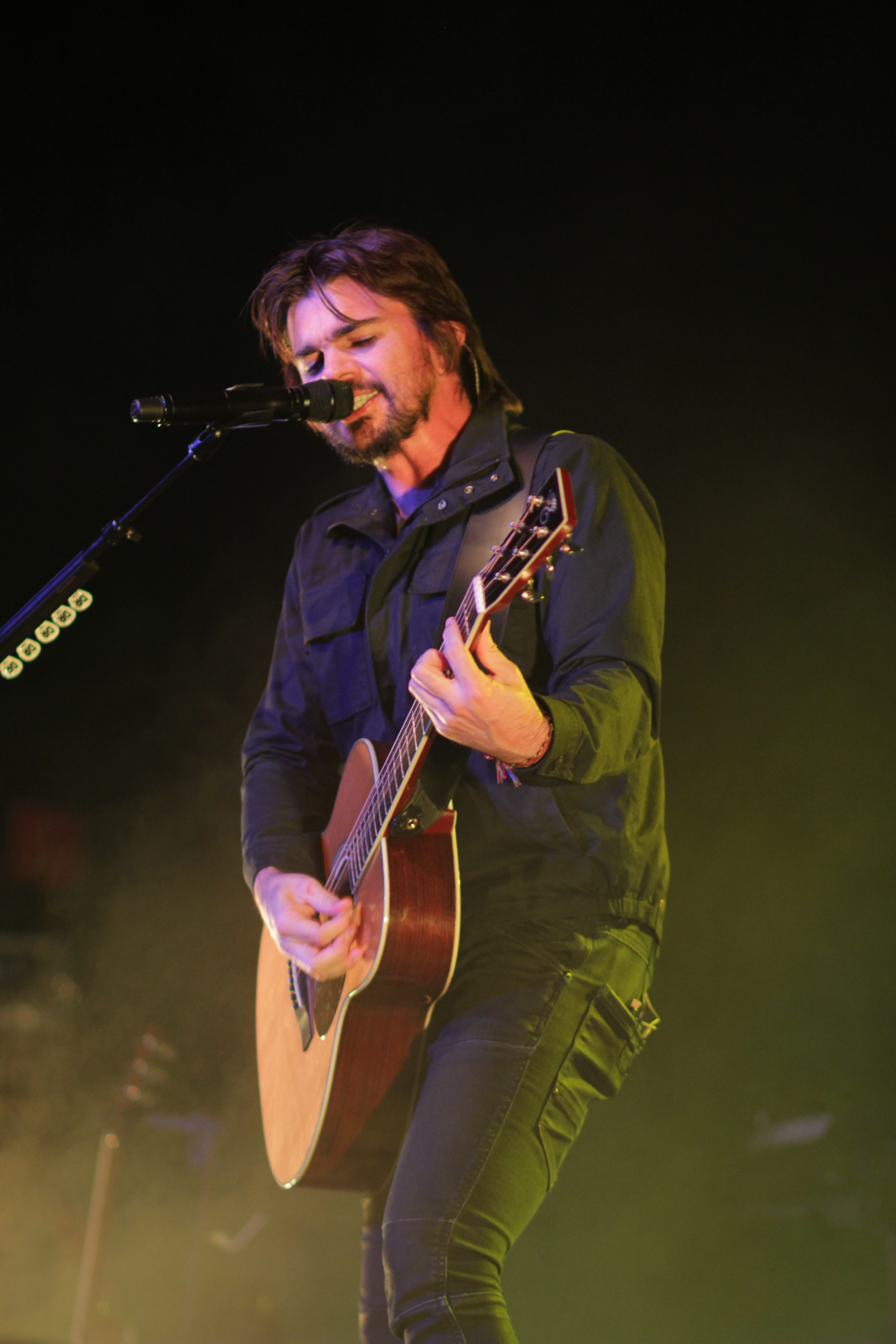
Juanes performing on the 'Unplugged' tour

At the 2005 Latin Grammy Awards, Juanes won three additional awards to his nine previous Grammy awards. He took the award for Best Rock Song for "Nada Valgo Sin Tu Amor" ("I am Worthless Without Your Love"), Best Rock Solo Album for Mi Sangre and Best Music Video for "Volverte a Ver" ("To See You Again"). On 9 December 2005, Juanes performed "La camisa negra" at an international gala in Germany celebrating the 2006 FIFA World Cup Final Draw evening. In 2006, he recorded a duet of "The Shadow of Your Smile" with Tony Bennett for Bennett's Duets: an American Classic.

=== 2006–09: La Vida... Es Un Ratico ===
In June 2006, Juanes began a year-long sabbatical to spend time with his wife, model Karen Martínez, and their daughters Luna and Paloma. He was working on an album that was released on October 23, 2007. When asked about the possibility of recording an album in English, Juanes responded, "singing in Spanish is very important because it's the language in which I think and feel. I respect people that sing in English, but for now I'll keep my Spanish." Juanes planned to launch his own music label, named 4J, in October 2007, to be distributed by the Universal Music Group. He was also working on a new album, titled La Vida... Es Un Ratico (Life is a Little Moment).

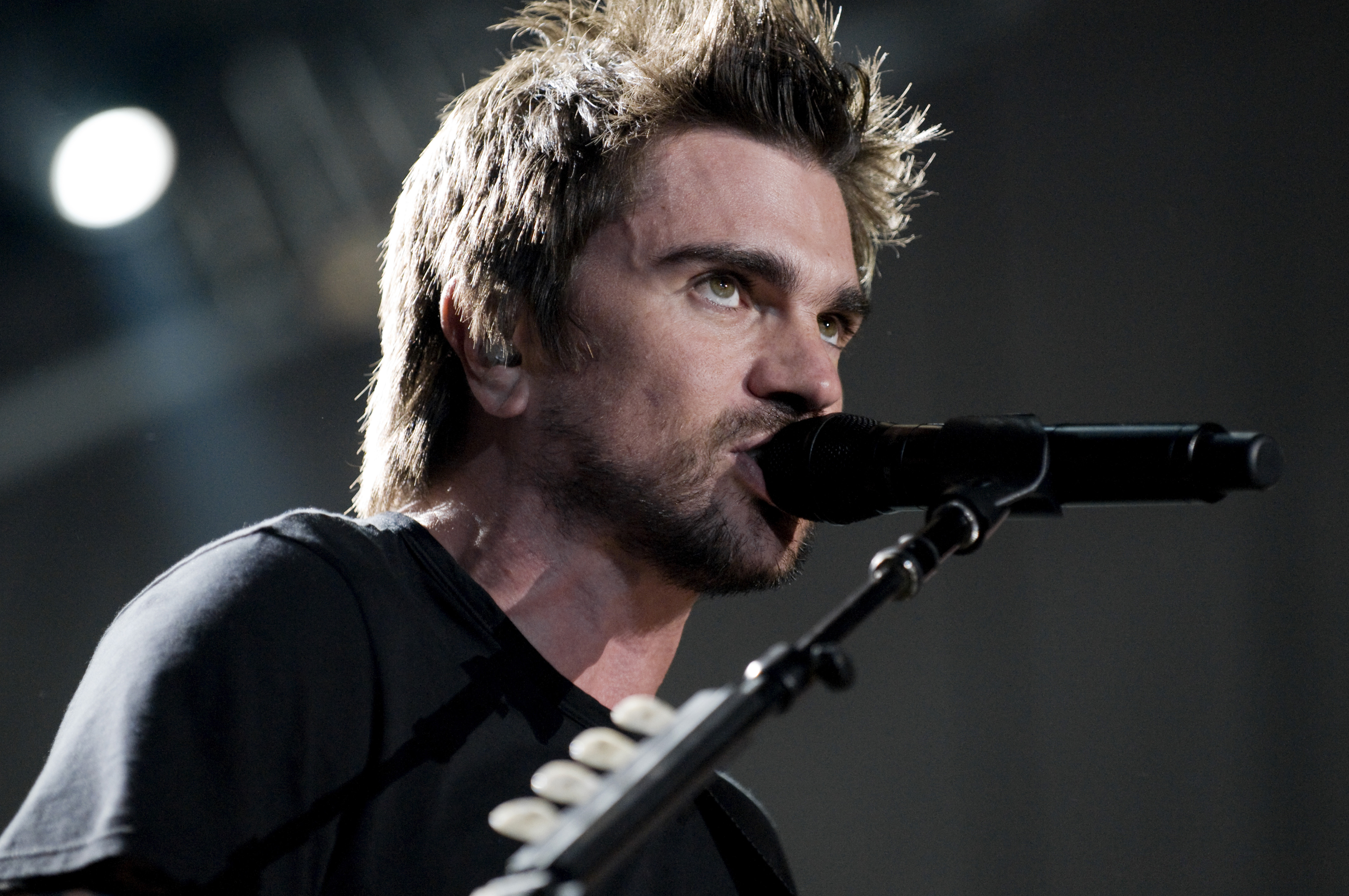
Juanes performing in 2008

La Vida... Es Un Ratico was released on 23 October 2007, with the first single being "Me Enamora" (I fall in love). The second single was "Gotas de Agua Dulce" (drops of sweet water), and the third single became the vallenato fusion of "Tres" (three).

On 11 December 2007, Juanes performed at the Nobel Peace Prize Concert in Oslo, Norway together with a variety of artists, which was broadcast live to over 100 countries.

On 24 November 2008, Juanes re-released the album as "La vida... es un ratico (en vivo)" [Deluxe Edition][2 CD/DVD Combo]" The album aside the 14 original songs, contains two previously unreleased songs: "Falsas Palabras" (false words) and "Odio Por Amor" (hate for love) which is also the current single. This new re-edition also includes seven live versions of songs played during his U.S. La Vida Tour. As another bonus added, Juanes also included a duet of his song "Hoy Me Voy" (today I leave) with singer Colbie Caillat. The DVD contains the music videos of the four singles of the cd as well as a few live video recordings of the US tour.

=== 2010–2013: P.A.R.C.E and his Juanes MTV Unplugged ===
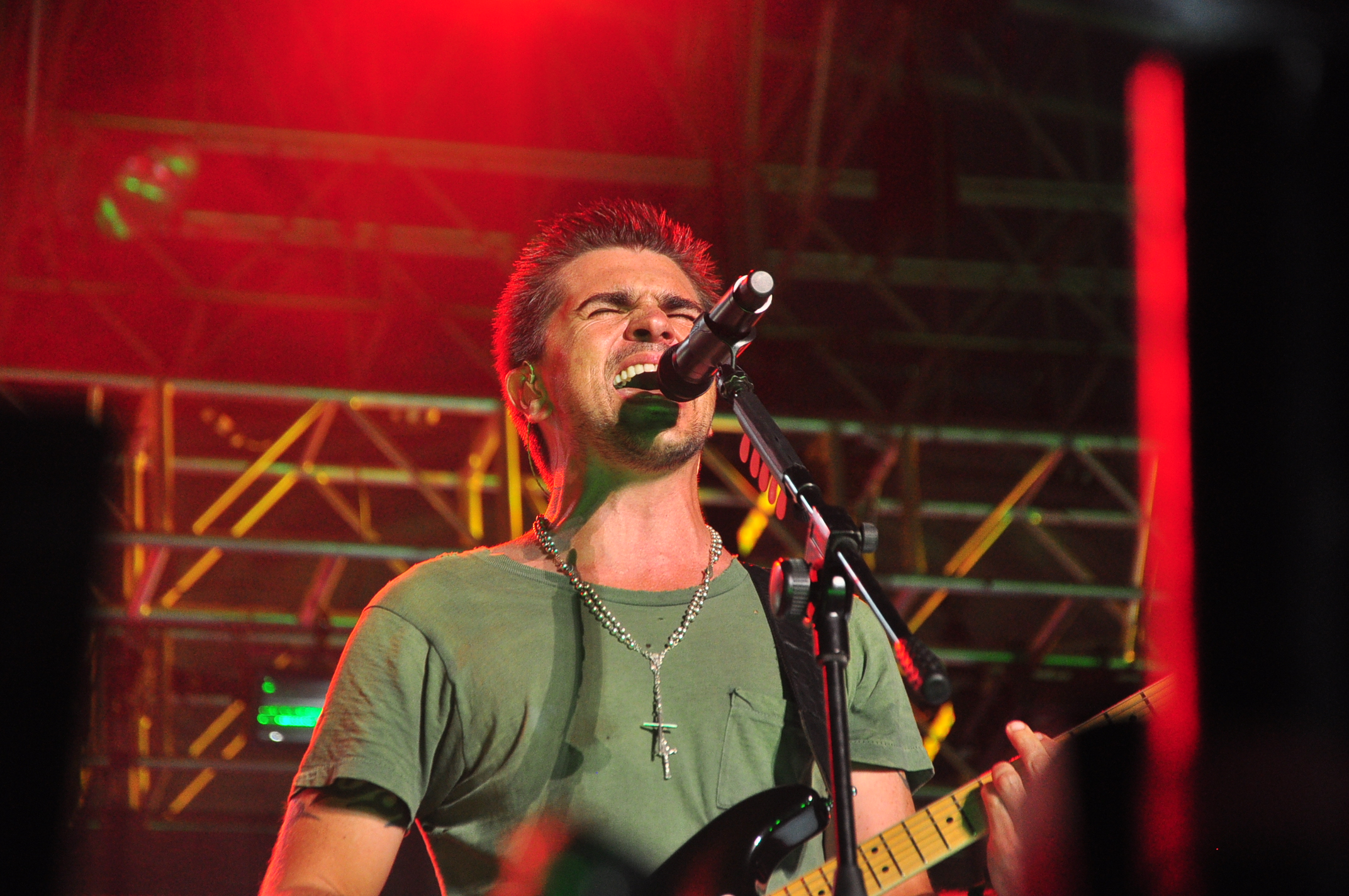
Juanes FPML

In 2010, Juanes performed in the 2010 FIFA World Cup Kickoff Concert, as well as the Macy's Thanksgiving Day Parade in New York. In addition, he released his album P.A.R.C.E. which featured the No. 1 Billboard hit Yerbatero and the top-ten hit Y No Regresas. 17 February, Juanes performed live on the third single from their fifth studio album Regalito in the delivery of the Premios Lo Nuestro. The album has sold 1 million copies worldwide. In February 2012, the Colombian singer Juanes took the stage at Juanes MTV Unplugged to record a live album at the direction of Juan Luis Guerra. On 6 March, Juanes will release "La Señal" as an unreleased song from his Unplugged.

=== 2014–2015: Loco de Amor ===
On 11 March 2014, Juanes released his sixth studio album by Universal Music Latino Loco de amor. It is his first studio album since P.A.R.C.E. (2010). At the Latin Grammy Awards of 2014, the album won the Best Pop/Rock Album. Loco de Amor was nominated for Lo Nuestro Award for Pop Album of the Year. It was nominated for a Grammy Award for Best Latin Pop Album in 2015.

=== 2017-2018: Mis planes son amarte ===
Juanes contributed to the 2017 animated film Ferdinand. In that production, he both wrote the original score "Lay Your Head On Me" and played the voice of Juan (Nina's father). On 12 May 2017, Juanes released Mis planes son amarte. The album was accompanied by a space-themed visual album. The visual component was filmed in Colombia and Mexico and represents a spiritual journey through challenges and victories. Juanes explained that the album alludes to "the connection between our most ancestral, indigenous roots and the universe and its planets. Those points are even more closely tied than we can imagine." It also explores the daily life and spirituality of the Kogi people, an indigenous group that resides in Sierra Nevada de Santa Marta mountains in northern Colombia. Mis planes son amarte won Latin Grammy Award for Best Pop/Rock Album at the 18th Annual Latin Grammy Awards. The album is also Juanes's first to feature a song in English, "Goodbye for Now". In June 2017, Juanes collaborated with Chilean singer Mon Laferte on the cumbia-influenced single "Amárrame". On 23 May 2018, Juanes performed with Mon Laferte as part of National Public Radio's Tiny Desk Concerts series.

=== 2018–2019: Transition to urban genre and Más futuro que pasado ===
In 2018, the Mexican singer Raymix included him in a version of his song "Oye Mujer". In 2018 he performed at Starlite Festival presented "Pa' Dentro" -the first official single from the then upcoming album-, which was officially released on 31 May 2018. On 10 January 2019, he released his first single of the year, «La plata», which has the participation of Colombian singer Lalo Ebratt. On 23 May, he presented his single "Querer Mejor" alongside Canadian singer Alessia Cara. In July, he collaborated on the song "Todo bien" by the Trapical Minds collective alongside Lalo Ebratt, Skinny Happy, Yera. Then, in August he collaborated on the Greeicy single "Minifalda". On 5 September, he released his single "Bonita" with his compatriot Sebastián Yatra, which was positioned at the top of the American music charts. Later, on 7 November, he presented "Aurora", which he interprets with Colombian rapper Crudo Means Raw. In November, he released his single "Tequila", which features the collaboration of the Mexican singer Christian Nodal. The next day, he presented his new album Más futuro que pasado, where it emphasizes his transition to the urban genre without leaving aside his classic rock and pop musical style. On 5 December, he released his latest single "Más futuro que pasado".

In December 2019, Juanes released the album Más futuro que pasado. The album features Colombian musicians Sebastián Yatra, Crudo Means Raw, and Lalo Ebratt as well as regional Mexican singer Christian Nodal, Dominican-American MC Fuego, and Canadian singer Alessia Cara, who sings in Spanish for the first time on the song "Querer Mejor". The album was inspired Juanes' optimism for the future of Colombia and highlights the diversity of the country, featuring a variety of traditional musical genres such as vallenato and cumbia combined with modern musical styles. Juanes explained that "it gives me a lot of hope. Esperanza, you know — Más futuro que pasado is about having the drive to keep experimenting. I want to keep writing music, I want to live more. This is the point of my life when I want to live so much. But before I do anything, I start from the roots. And from there I build my vision."

=== 2021: Origen ===
On 28 May 2021, Juanes released his 10th studio album, Origen. The album consists of twelve covers that span his musical influences, including Bruce Springsteen, Juan Luis Guerra, and Bob Marley. Juanes described these songs as having a significant "impact on the memory of my youth, my adolescence, my childhood." Like much of Juanes' discography, the album encompasses many styles from tango, merengue, and vallenato to reggae, folk, and heavy metal. The release of the album was accompanied by a documentary released on Amazon Prime, in which Juanes explains why he chose each song, speaks with several of the songwriters he covers, and performs music videos that channel the era in which they were written. Juanes contributed a cover of the Metallica song "Enter Sandman" to the charity tribute album The Metallica Blacklist, released in September 2021.

== Musical style and influences ==
"Nada valgo sin tu amor" (2004)
The lead single from Mi sangre features Juanes' characteristic rock influences and a melodic chorus.

Growing up in Colombia, Juanes' first musical exposure included cumbia, salsa, vallenato and the rural Antioquian genre known as guasca, all of which influence his music. In his youth, Juanes was a fan of rock group Metallica and attempted to emulate the group's style, but recalls that "after many years I just realized that I was not gonna be like James Hetfield". He notes that his musical tastes are diverse: "It's good to have music for every moment. I can listen to Slayer and then the next song, Residente. Or I just can go to Ruben Blades and Silvio Rodriguez, then go to Caetano Veloso. And then I go back to Metallica!" He has also expressed admiration for Spanish singer Rosalía, Puerto Rican rapper Tego Calderón, Colombian reggaeton artist J Balvin, American singer Billie Eilish, and American rapper and singer Travis Scott.

Juanes's debut album, Fíjate Bien, contains themes on loss and violence, alluding to deaths caused by land mines. The album reflected grief in Juanes' personal life, including the deaths of his cousin and father, and Juanes himself described the record as "dark and depressing". His next album, Un Dia Normal, takes a more optimistic approach while continuing to discuss themes of war and violence. The record also included lighter themes such as romantic love to reflect falling in love with his now-wife. Mi Sangre continued themes of social conflict, discussing topics such as terrorism and kidnapping. His song, "Rosario Tijeras" from Mi Sangre tells the story of a prostitute who becomes an assassin.

Romantic love is a common theme in Juanes' music. His album Mis planes son amarte was described as a collection of "gleaming, tuneful, good-natured songs about love". Though his songs are primarily in Spanish, he has performed songs in Italian, Portuguese, German, and English. On recording in other languages, Juanes noted in 2017, "It's hard when you have to change the way your muscles work," he said. "I don't want to go full crossover — that's not my plan — but I just wanted to do it someday."

== Activism ==
Juanes is outspoken in both his music and the media about violence and inequality in Colombia. Addressing the topic of victims of the Colombian civil war, Juanes stated: "these are your people, young people, people with families, and four or five of them are dying every day." Juanes established the Mi Sangre Foundation to help victims of anti-personnel mines In 2005, he was named by Time as one of the world's 100 most influential people. On 15 November 2005, he was honored at the annual benefit gala for Sir Paul McCartney's Adopt-A-Minefield for his work as a Goodwill Ambassador for United for Colombia, a non-profit organization that raises awareness about the impact of land mines within Colombia.

On 19 April 2006, Juanes performed before the European Parliament, as part of a campaign to increase awareness against the use of landmines around the world, including in his native Colombia. He was first singer to perform in the hemicycle where the European Parliament holds its plenary sessions. The Parliament gave a symbolic gift of €2.5 million to demine Colombia and to rehabilitate victims of the landmines. In honor of his work and his music, he was given an escopetarra (a decommissioned AK-47 converted into a guitar) by peace activist César López; he later sold it at a fundraiser in Beverly Hills for US$17,000. Juanes held a benefit concert on 24 May 2006, in conjunction with KLVE and Univision which raised roughly US$350,000 to care for injured children and provide prosthetics, wheelchairs, and land rehabilitation.

On 19 July 2006, French Culture Minister Renaud Donnedieu de Vabres awarded Juanes with the highest cultural honor given by France, L'Ordre des Arts et des Lettres, declaring him "Knight in the order of Arts and Letters" for his work in social activism. In December 2006, work began on a recreational park for the rehabilitation of the handicapped named "Parque Juanes de la Paz" in Medellín. The 68,000-square-meter facility will cost COL$10.6 billion, financed in part by the government of Medellín, and is to be completed by May 2007.

In June 2013, Juanes appeared in a Spanish-language public service announcement for the HIV/AIDS non-profit organization Lifebeat in partnership with the Centers for Disease Control and MTV. In the video, the singer encouraged HIV testing and cited a statistic stating that there are a thousand new cases of HIV per month among people 13 to 24 years of age. Guillermo Chacon, president of The Latino Commission on AIDS, commented that "Celebrities like Juanes are crucial to raising awareness, which is one of the most important ways for people to understand that HIV infection can be prevented."

=== 2009 Peace Concert in Cuba ===
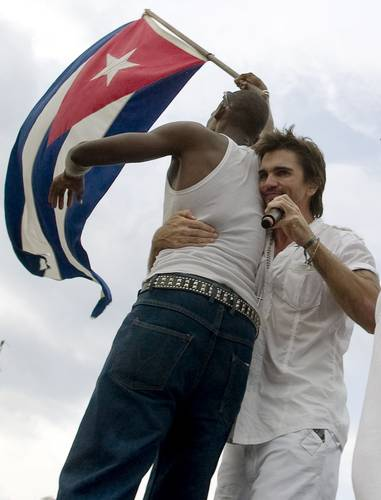
Juanes during the 2009 Peace Concert in Havana, Cuba

"Going to Cuba is a symbol that it's time to change people's minds, an opportunity to tell the world that people have to change."

— Juanes

On 5 August 2009, it was announced that Juanes would hold his second "Peace Without Borders" concert in Havana's storied Plaza de la Revolución on 20 September 2009.

Prior to the concert, Juanes received criticism by some in the Cuban-American/Cuban exile community in Miami who believed it would be seen as an act of support for the communist government of Cuba. Juanes expressed in an interview for Univision that he had no affiliation whatsoever to the Cuban government or their political views and that he saw it only as an artistic performance and nothing more.

On 20 August 2009, Juanes announced that he had considered canceling the peace concert citing "fears for his safety as well as his family", who reside with him in Miami on Key Biscayne. Juanes closed it along with 15 other Cuban and international artists and with more than one million people attending the concert."

== Personal life ==
Juanes met model/actress Karen Martínez during the filming of his video "Nada". On 6 August 2004, they were married. The couple separated in May 2007, after three years of marriage due to unresolved differences, but reconciled four months later. They have three children together, two daughters: Luna Aristizábal Martínez (born 6 September 2003), Paloma Aristizábal Martínez (born 2 June 2005), and one son, Dante Aristizábal Martínez (born 12 September 2009). Juanes is a vegetarian and lives in Key Biscayne, Florida.

== Discography ==
- Fíjate Bien (2000)
- Un Día Normal (2002)
- Mi Sangre (2004)
- La Vida... Es Un Ratico (2007)
- P.A.R.C.E. (2010)
- Loco de Amor (2014)
- Mis planes son amarte (2017)
- Más futuro que pasado (2019)
- Origen (2021)
- Vida Cotidiana (2023)
- JuanesTeban (2026)

== Filmography ==
Year	Title	Roles	Ref.
2017	Ferdinand	Juan	
2024	Captain Avispa	Sergeant Picadura	
2024	Pimpinero: Blood and Oil	Moisés	

== Awards and nominations ==
=== Grammy Awards ===
A Grammy Award is an accolade by the National Academy of Recording Arts and Sciences of the United States to recognize outstanding achievement in the music industry. Juanes has received nine nominations and won four.

Year	Nominee / work	Award	Result
2002	Fíjate Bien	Best Latin Rock, Urban or Alternative Album	Nominated
2003	Un Día Normal	Best Latin Rock, Urban or Alternative Album	Nominated
2005	Mi Sangre	Best Latin Rock, Urban or Alternative Album	Nominated
2009	La Vida... Es Un Ratico	Best Latin Pop Album	Won
2013	Juanes: MTV Unplugged	Best Latin Pop Album	Won
2015	Loco de Amor	Best Latin Pop Album	Nominated
2022	Origen	Best Latin Rock or Alternative Album	Won
2024	Vida Cotidiana	Best Latin Rock or Alternative Album	Won

=== Latin Grammy Awards ===
A Latin Grammy Award is an accolade by the Latin Academy of Recording Arts & Sciences to recognize outstanding achievement in the music industry. Juanes has received twenty-seven awards and forty-seven nominations. In 2019, he was honored as the Latin Recording Academy Person of the Year.

Year	Nominee / work	Award	Result
2001	Juanes	Best New Artist	Won
2001	Fíjate Bien	Best Rock Solo Vocal Album	Won
2001	Fíjate Bien	Best Rock Song	Won
2001	Fíjate Bien	Album of the Year	Nominated
2001	Fíjate Bien	Song of the Year	Nominated
2001	Fíjate Bien	Record of the Year	Nominated
2001	Fíjate Bien	Best Short Form Music Video	Nominated
2002	A Dios le Pido	Song of the Year	Nominated
2002	A Dios le Pido	Best Rock Song	Won
2002	A Dios le Pido	Best Short Form Music Video	Nominated
2003	Un Día Normal	Album of the Year	Won
2003	Es Por Ti	Song of the Year	Won
2003	Es Por Ti	Record of the Year	Won
2003	Un Día Normal	Best Rock Solo Vocal Album	Won
2003	Mala Gente	Best Rock Song	Won
2005	Mi Sangre	Best Rock Solo Vocal Album	Won
2005	Nada Valgo Sin Tu Amor	Best Rock Song	Won
2005	Volverte a Ver	Best Short Form Music Video	Won
2008	La Vida... Es Un Ratico	Album of the Year	Won
2008	Me Enamora	Song of the Year	Won
2008	Me Enamora	Record of the Year	Won
2008	La Vida... Es Un Ratico	Best Male Pop Vocal Album	Won
2008	Me Enamora	Best Short Form Music Video	Won
2009	Pombo Musical	Best Latin Children's Album	Won
2012	Juanes: MTV Unplugged	Album of the Year	Won
2012	Azul Sabina (feat. Joaquín Sabina)	Song of the Year	Nominated
2012	Azul Sabina (feat. Joaquín Sabina)	Record of the Year	Nominated
2012	Juanes: MTV Unplugged	Best Long Form Music Video	Won
2014	Loco de Amor	Best Pop/Rock Album	Won
2014	Mil Pedazos	Best Rock Song	Nominated
2015	Loco de Amor: La Historia	Best Long Form Music Video	Won
2017	Mis planes son amarte	Best Engineered Album	Won
2017	Mis planes son amarte	Best Long Form Music Video	Nominated
2017	Mis planes son amarte	Best Rock/Pop Album	Won
2018	Pa' Dentro	Best Short Form Music Video	Won
2019	Querer Mejor (feat. Alessia Cara)	Record of the Year	Nominated
2019	La Plata (feat. Lalo Ebratt)	Record of the Year	Nominated
2019	Querer Mejor (feat. Alessia Cara)	Song of the Year	Nominated
2020	Bonita (feat. Sebastián Yatra)	Song of the Year	Nominated
2020	Bonita (feat. Sebastián Yatra)	Best Pop Song	Nominated
2020	Más Futuro Que Pasado	Best Pop Vocal Album	Nominated
2021	Origen	Album of the Year	Nominated
2021	Origen	Best Rock/Pop Album	Won
2021	Origen (Documental)	Best Long Form Music Video	Nominated
2023	Vida Cotidiana	Album of the Year	Nominated
2023	Vida Cotidiana	Best Rock/Pop Album	Won
2023	Gris	Best Rock Song	Nominated

== See also ==
- Music of Colombia
- Colombian rock
- Life (2009 TV series) narrated by Juanes
- List of best-selling Latin music artists
