= 6th Annual Latin Grammy Awards =

Music awards presented Nov 2005

6th Latin Grammy Awards
- Date: November 3, 2005
- Venue: Shrine Auditorium, Los Angeles, California
- Hosted by: Rebecca de Alba and Eduardo Santamarina

Highlights
- Person of the Year: José José

Television/radio coverage
- Network: Univision

The 6th Annual Latin Grammy Awards were held in Los Angeles at the Shrine Auditorium on Thursday, November 3, 2005. It was the first ceremony to be broadcast by Univision in the United States. Ivan Lins was the big winner, winning two awards, including Album of the Year. He is the first and only Brazilian and Portuguese-language artist to win Album of the Year to date. Alejandro Sanz was honored with Record of the Year and Song of the Year. Juanes won three awards including Best Rock Solo Vocal Album.

== Awards ==
Winners are in bold text.

=== General ===
Record of the Year

Alejandro Sanz — "Tu No Tienes Alma"

- Bebe — "Malo"
- Daddy Yankee — "Gasolina"
- Reyli — "Amor del Bueno"
- Aleks Syntek featuring Ana Torroja — "Duele el Amor"

Album of the Year

Ivan Lins — Cantando Histórias

- Bebe — Pafuera Telarañas
- Obie Bermúdez — Todo el Año
- Intocable — Diez
- Diego Torres — MTV Unplugged

Song of the Year

Alejandro Sanz — "Tu No Tienes Alma"

- Jorge Drexler — "Al otro lado del río"
- Aleks Syntek — "Duele el Amor" (Aleks Syntek featuring Ana Torroja)
- Bebe — "Malo"
- Obie Bermúdez and Elsten C. Torres — "Todo El Año" (Obie Bermúdez)

Best New Artist

Bebe

- Ilona
- JD Natasha
- Diana Navarro
- Reik

=== Pop ===
Best Female Pop Vocal Album

Laura Pausini — Escucha

- Bebe — Pafuera Telarañas
- Andrea Echeverri — Andrea Echeverri
- Fey — La Fuerza Del Destino
- Soraya — El Otro Lado de Mi

Best Male Pop Vocal Album

Obie Bermúdez — Todo el Año

- Marc Anthony — Amar Sin Mentiras
- Franco De Vita — Stop
- Alejandro Fernández — A Corazón Abierto
- Marco Antonio Solís — Razón de Sobra

Best Pop Album by a Duo/Group with Vocals

Bacilos — Sin Vergüenza

- Amaral — Pájaros en la cabeza
- Andy & Lucas — Desde mi barrio
- Elefante — Elefante
- Presuntos Implicados — Postales

=== Urban ===
Best Urban Music Album

Daddy Yankee — Barrio Fino

- Don Omar — The Last Don Live
- Luny Tunes — The Kings of the Beats
- Orishas — El Kilo
- Vico C — Desahogo

=== Rock ===
Best Rock Solo Vocal Album

Juanes — Mi Sangre

- Enrique Bunbury — El viaje a ninguna parte
- JD Natasha — Imperfecta-Imperfect
- Fito Páez — Mi vida con ellas
- Revolver — Mestizo

Best Rock Album by a Duo/Group with Vocals

Molotov — Con Todo Respeto

- Enanitos Verdes — En Vivo
- Jarabe de Palo — 1m² Un Metro Cuadrado
- Locos Por Juana — Música Pa'l Pueblo
- Volumen Cero — Estelar

Best Alternative Music Album

Ozomatli — Street Signs

- Circo — En El Cielo de Tu Boca
- Ely Guerra — Sweet & Sour, Hot y Spicy
- Los Amigos Invisibles — The Venezuelan Zinga Son, Vol. 1
- Los Rabanes — Ecolecua

Best Rock Song

Juanes — "Nada Valgo Sin Tu Amor"

- Beto Cuevas — "Bienvenido Al Anochecer" (La Ley)
- Martin Chan and JD Natasha — "Lágrimas" (JD Natasha)
- Fito Páez — "Polaroid de Ordinaria Locura"
- J.L Abreu and Egui Santiago — "Un Accidente" (Circo)

=== Tropical ===
Best Salsa Album

Marc Anthony — Valió la Pena

- Oscar D'León — Así soy
- El Gran Combo de Puerto Rico — Aquí Estamos y... ¡De Verdad!
- Gilberto Santa Rosa — Auténtico
- Spanish Harlem Orchestra — Across 110th Street

Best Merengue Album

Elvis Crespo — Saboréalo

- Los Toros Band — En Vivo 2004
- Kinito Méndez — Celebra Conmigo
- Ramón Orlando — Generaciones
- Toño Rosario — Resistiré

Best Contemporary Tropical Album

Carlos Vives — El Rock de Mi Pueblo

- Bachá — Bachá
- Juan Formell and Los Van Van — Chapeando
- Monchy y Alexandra — Hasta El Fin
- Michael Stuart — Sin Miedo
- Various Artists — Cuba Le Canta A Serrat

Best Traditional Tropical Album

Cachao — ¡Ahora Sí!

- Manny Manuel — Nostalgia
- Manuel "El Guajiro" Mirabal — Buena Vista Social Club Presents: Manuel Guajiro Mirabal
- Omara Portuondo — Flor De Amor
- Tropicana All Stars — Tradición

Best Tropical Song

Juan Luis Guerra 440 — "Las Avispas"

- Cachao — "Ahora Sí"
- José Luis Morín A. and Olga Tañón — "Bandolero" (Olga Tañón)
- Carlos I. Medina and Carlos Vives — "Como Tú" (Carlos Vives)
- Marc Anthony and Estéfano — "Valió La Pena" (Marc Anthony)

=== Singer-Songwriter ===
Best Singer-Songwriter Album

Gian Marco — Resucitar

- Djavan — Vaidade
- Pedro Guerra — Bolsillos
- Kevin Johansen — City Zen
- Vicentico — Los Rayos

=== Regional Mexican ===
Best Ranchero Album

Luis Miguel — México En La Piel

- Pepe Aguilar — No Soy De Nadie
- Rocío Dúrcal— Alma Ranchera
- Vicente Fernández — Vicente Fernández y Sus Corridos Consentidos
- Ana Gabriel — Tradicional

Best Banda Album

Banda El Recodo — En Vivo

- Conjunto Atardecer — Los Número Uno del Pasito Duranguense
- K-Paz de la Sierra — Pensando En Ti
- Los Horóscopos de Durango — Locos de Amor
- Lupillo Rivera — Con Mis Propias Manos

Best Grupero Album

Ana Bárbara — Loca de Amar
Oscar De La Rosa and La Mafia — Para El Pueblo

- Grupo Bronco — Sin Riendas
- Guardianes del Amor — Olvidarte Nunca
- Volumen X — Sigo Pensando En Ti

Best Tejano Album

David Lee Garza, Joel Guzmán and Sunny Sauceda — Polkas, Gritos y Acordeónes

- David Lee Garza & Los Musicales — Solo Contigo
- Jimmy González & El Grupo Mazz — Para Mi Gente
- La Tropa F — Milagro
- Bobby Pulido — Vive

Best Norteño Album

Intocable — Diez

- Conjunto Primavera — Hoy Como Ayer
- Los Palominos — Atrévete
- Los Tigres del Norte — Directo Al Corazón
- Michael Salgado — El Zurdo De Oro

Best Regional Mexican Song

Josué Contreras and Johnny Lee Rosas — "Aire" (Intocable)

- Freddie Martínez, Sr. — "Corazón Dormido" (Jimmy González & El Grupo Mazz)
- Edel Ramírez — "Me Vuelvo Loco" (Los Palominos)
- Luigi Giraldo, Cruz "CK" Martínez and A.B. Quintanilla — "Na Na Na (Dulce Niña)" (Kumbia Kings)

=== Instrumental ===
Best Instrumental Album

David Sánchez — Coral

- Manuel Alejandro — Nuevos Caminos
- Ed Calle — Ed Calle Plays Santana
- Pedro Guzman — Ti ple Jazz
- Gonzalo Rubalcaba and New Cuban Quartet — Paseo

=== Traditional ===
Best Folk Album

Lila Downs — One Blood Una Sangre

- Camerata Coral and Grupo Tepeu — Misa Criolla - Navidad Nuestra De Ariel Ramírez
- Los Nocheros — Noche Amiga Mía
- John Santos and El Coro Folklórico Kindembo — Para Ellos
- Various Artists — Homenaje A Luis Miranda "El Pico De Oro"

Best Tango Album

Pablo Ziegler, Quique Sinesi and Walter Castro — Bajo Cero

- Hybrid Tango — Hybrid Tango
- Nicolás Ledesma Cuarteto — De Tango Somos
- Adriana Nano — Buenos Aires, Viaje / Buenos Aires, Journey
- Trelles and Cirigliano — Solo Para Dos

Best Flamenco Album

Tomatito — Aguadulce

- Diego Carrasco — Mi Adn Flamenco
- José Mercé — Confí De Fuá
- Gerardo Núñez with Paolo Fresu, Perico Sambeat and Mariano Díaz — Andando El Tiempo
- Niña Pastori — No Hay Quinto Malo

=== Jazz ===
Best Latin Jazz Album

Bebo Valdés — Bebo de Cuba - Suite Cubana - El Solar de Bebo - Cuadernos de Nueva York

- Paoli Mejias — Mi Tambor
- Bob Mintzer, Giovanni Hidalgo, Andy Gonzalez, David Chesky and Randy Brecker — The Body Acoustic
- Negroni's Trio — Piano/Drums/Bass
- Poncho Sanchez — Poncho at Montreux

=== Christian ===
Best Christian Album (Spanish Language)

Juan Luis Guerra 440 — Para Ti

- Marco Barrientos — Viento Mas Fuego
- Pablo Olivares — Luz En Mi Vida
- Rojo — Día de Independencia
- Marcos Witt — Tiempo de Navidad

Best Christian Album (Portuguese Language)

Soraya Moraes — Deixa O Teu Rio Me Levar - Ao Vivo

- Aline Barros — Som De Adoradores - Ao Vivo
- Eyshila — Terremoto - Ao Vivo
- Ludmila Ferber — Para Orar e Adorar 3 - Ouço Deus Me Chamar
- Rose Nascimento — Para O Mundo Ouvir
- Oficina G3 — Além do que os Olhos Podem Ver
- Alexandre Soul — Cantando, Dançando e Louvando!

=== Brazilian ===
Best Brazilian Contemporary Pop Album

Lenine — Incité

- Carlinhos Brown — El Milagro de Candeal
- Rita Lee — MTV ao Vivo
- Tom Zé — Estudando o Pagode

Best Brazilian Rock Album

Charlie Brown Jr. — Tamo Aí na Atividade

- Barão Vermelho — Barão Vermelho
- Leela — Leela
- Tianastácia — Tianastácia ao Vivo

Best Samba/Pagode Album

Martinho da Vila — Brasilatinidade

- Jorge Aragão — Ao Vivo 3
- Beth Carvalho — A Madrinha Do Samba / Ao Vivo Convida
- Wilson das Neves — Brasão de Orfeu
- Nei Lopes — Partido ao Cubo
- Zeca Pagodinho — À Vera

Best MPB Album

Ivan Lins — Cantando Histórias

- Gilberto Gil — Eletracústico
- João Gilberto — João Gilberto in Tokyo
- Toninho Horta — Com o Pé no Forró
- Joyce — Banda Maluca

Best Romantic Music Album

Roberto Carlos — Pra Sempre ao Vivo no Pacaembu

- Raimundo Fagner — Donos do Brasil
- Leonardo — Leonardo Canta Grandes Sucessos
- Roberta Miranda — Alma Sertaneja
- Alexandre Pires — Alto Falante

Best Brazilian Roots/Regional Album

Ivete Sangalo — MTV ao Vivo

- Renato Borghetti — Gaitapontocom
- Caju & Castanha — Recado a São Paulo
- Dominguinhos, Sivuca and Oswaldinho — Cada Um Belisca Um Pouco
- Forróçacana — Os Maiores Sucessos de São João
- Gil — O Canto da Sereia
- Elba Ramalho and Dominguinhos — Baião de Dois

Best Brazilian Song

Lenine and Ivan Santos — "Ninguém Faz Idéia" (Lenine)

- Francis Hime and Olivia Hime — "Canção Transparente" (Olivia Hime)
- José Miguel Wisnik — "Ponte Aérea" (Eveline Hecker)
- Totonho Villeroy — "São Sebastião"

=== Children's ===
Best Latin Children's Album

Lina Luna — Lina Luna

- Christell — La Fiesta Continúa!!!
- Floricienta — Floricienta y su banda
- Ke Zafados — Ke Zafados
- Los Payasónicos — Poder Payasónico
- Misión S.O.S — Aventura y Amor

=== Classical ===
Best Classical Album

Cuarteto de Cuerdas Buenos Aires and Paquito D'Rivera — Riberas

- Orquestra de Câmara Rio Strings — Fantasia Brasileira
- José Serebrier — Glazunov Symphony Nº 5 / The Seasons
- Leo Brouwer — Homo Ludens
- Sharon Isbin — Rodrigo Concierto de Aranjuez/Villa Lobos: Concerto For Guitar/Ponce: Concierto Del Sur

=== Production ===
Best Engineered Album

Gustavo Borner — MTV Unplugged (Diego Torres)

- Chuy Flores and Jack Sáenz III — Diez (Intocable)
- Seth Atkins, Javier Garza, Cruz "CK" Martínez and Robert "Bobbo" Gómez III — Fuego (Kumbia Kings)
- Robert Carranza, Serban Ghenea and Anton Pukshansky — Street Signs (Ozomatli)
- Antonio Cortes — Velvetina (Miguel Bosé)

Producer of the Year

Gustavo Santaolalla

- Paco de Lucía
- Sergio George
- Sebastian Krys
- Afo Verde

=== Music video ===
Best Music Video

Juanes — "Volverte a Ver"

- La Ley — "Mírate "
- Molotov — "Amateur"
- Aleks Syntek — "A Veces Fuí"
- Vicentico — "Los Caminos de la Vida"

=== Special awards ===
Lifetime Achievement Awards

- Johnny Pacheco
- Sandro
- Generoso Jiménez
- Sérgio Mendes
- Jorge Ben Jor
- Rocío Dúrcal

Trustees Awards

- Eduardo Magallanes
- Rafael Pérez Botija
- Pierre Cossette
