= Deportation of Americans from the United States =

Deportation of Americans from the United States is the illegal expulsion, return or extradition of Americans to other countries, often after being convicted of a crime. These individuals in removal proceedings include Americans by birth and legal immigrants that were naturalized under 8 U.S.C. § 1427 or admitted as nationals of the United States under the Child Citizenship Act of 2000. A U.S. citizen cannot legally be deported, and has the legal right to return to the United States at any time.

== Legal background ==
Some have been placed in immigration detention centers to be deported but were later released. Academic studies say over 4,000 U.S. citizens experienced immigration detention or deportation in 2010.

Under 8 CFR 239.2, any officer mentioned in 8 CFR 239.1 may at any time cancel a "notice to appear" against any person who: (1) turns out to be a national of the United States; or (2) one that is not removable under the Immigration and Nationality Act (INA). And under 8 CFR 1239.2, any Immigration Judge may terminate the removal proceeding of any person who turns out to be a national of the United States or one that is not removable under the INA. A "notice to appear" that contains material false information (and/or omits a material fact) legally makes the entire removal proceeding void ab initio.

=== Statutory, regulatory and judicial relief ===
A forceful and illegal deportation from the United States entitles the victim to seek judicial relief. The relief may include a declaratory judgment with an injunction issued against the Attorney General or the Secretary of Homeland Security requesting appropriate immigration benefits and/or damages under the Federal Tort Claims Act (FTCA) as well as under Bivens v. Six Unknown Named Agents.

== Physically removed Americans from the United States ==
A number of Americans have been placed in immigration detention centers to be deported but were later released. Up to one percent of all those detained in immigration detention centers are nationals of the United States according to research by Jacqueline Stevens, a professor of political science at Northwestern University.

The following is an incomplete list of Americans who have actually experienced deportation from the United States:

- In 1999, Roberto Dominquez, born in Lawrence, Massachusetts, was deported to the Dominican Republic. Dominguez lived there for the next ten years and returned to the United States in September 2009 after being granted a U.S. passport after producing his U.S. birth certificate. In October 2011, federal authorities had asked the Commonwealth of Massachusetts to detain him and also had required Dominguez to surrender his U.S. passport. The government was unconvinced in this case and claimed that there were two people by the same name, both born during the same month and year. According to the government, both children were born to parents with the same addresses, and that one child was born in Santo Domingo, the capital of the Dominican Republic.
- In 2007, Pedro Guzman, born in the State of California, was forcefully removed to Mexico but returned several months later by crossing the Mexico–United States border. He was compensated in 2010 by receiving $350,000 from the government.
- In 2008, Mark Daniel Lyttle, born in the State of North Carolina, was forcefully removed to Mexico and spent 125 days wandering around Central America but later returned to the United States from Guatemala and filed a damages lawsuit in federal court, which he ultimately won.
- Andres Robles Gonzalez derived U.S. citizenship through his U.S. citizen father before being forcefully removed to Mexico in December 2008. In 2011, he was returned to the United States and filed a damages lawsuit in federal court, which he ultimately won.
- Esteban Tiznado-Reyna was born in Mexico to a father who had an Arizona birth certificate, which was found unreliable in an immigration court. Tiznado was found not guilty of illegal reentry into the United States in 2008, but ICE still deported him despite the verdict. Documents were uncovered that the USCIS withheld in the 1980s, showing his proof of citizenship.
- Several U.S. citizens were deported in April 2025:
  - U.S. District judge Terry A. Doughty stated that a 2-year-old U.S. citizen (identified only by her initials V.M.L.) was deported to Honduras "with no meaningful process" with her pregnant mother who allegedly requested the child be taken with her, despite the child's citizenship. The judge cited Lyttle v. United States, saying "it is illegal and unconstitutional to deport, detain for deportation, or recommend deportation of a U.S. citizen."
  - A 10-year old girl with brain cancer, who is an American citizen, was deported with her family to Mexico after being stopped at an immigration checkpoint while on the way to an emergency medical appointment.
  - A 7-year-old girl and her 4-year-old brother, who has stage 4 cancer, were deported to Honduras without access to the 4-year-old's cancer medications.

== See also ==
- Deportation and removal from the United States
- Deportation of Korean adoptees from the United States
- Detention and deportation of American citizens in the second Trump administration
- List of people deported or removed from the United States
- Mexican Repatriation
- Deportation of Indian nationals under Donald Trump
