= Impersonations of United States immigration officials =

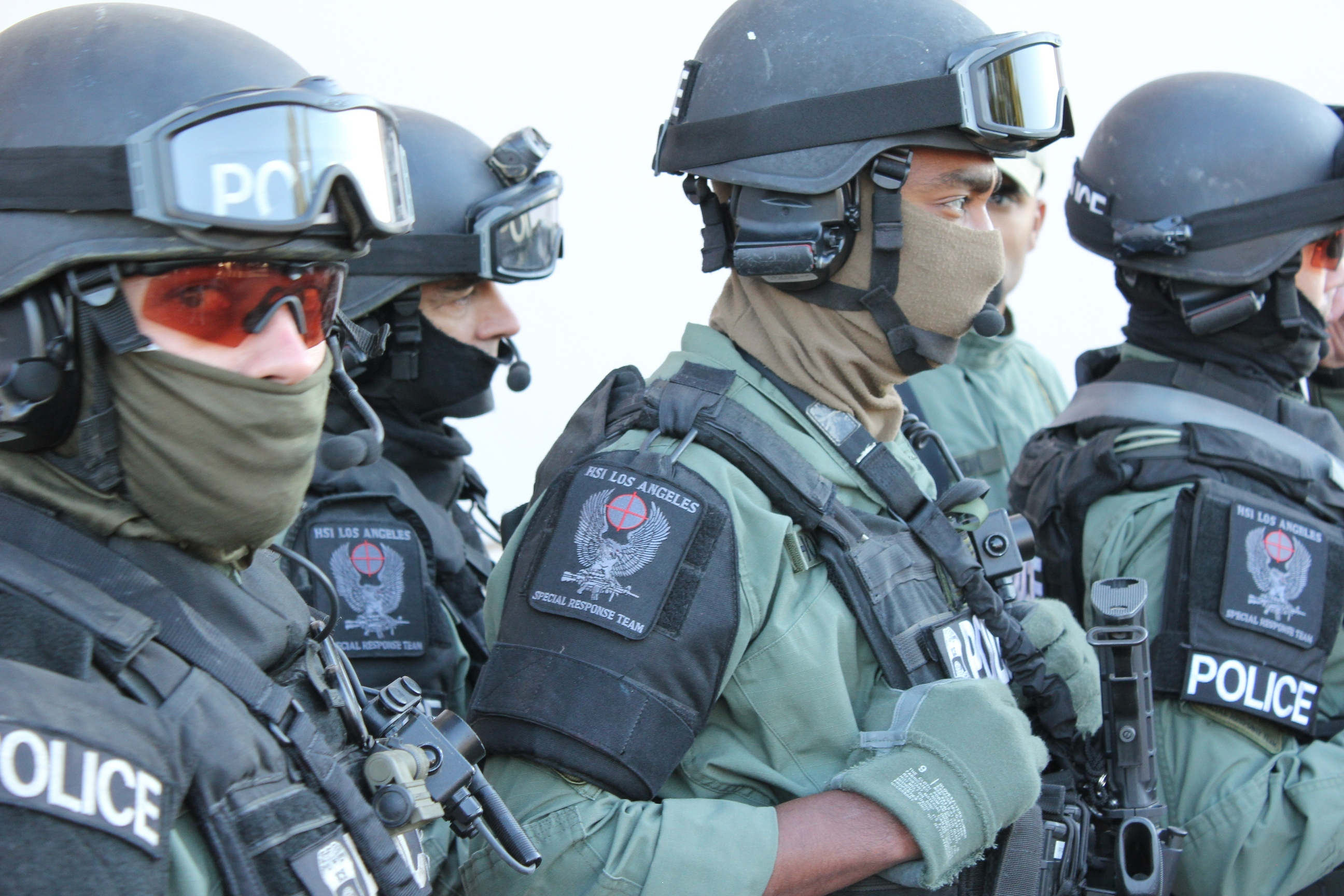
Masked and anonymous ICE agents are a focal point for immigration enforcement in the Trump administration.

During the second Donald Trump presidential administration, ongoing impersonations of United States immigration officials have become a chronic crime problem across the United States. President Donald Trump prioritized large-scale deportation of immigrant populations through United States Immigration and Customs Enforcement (ICE). This includes mandatory quotas for Federal law enforcement and state security forces in the U.S. to capture and detain at least 3,000 people per day.

The administration's reliance on raids often carried out by agents in plainclothes, operating from unmarked vehicles and without visible warrants, blurred the line between legitimate and fraudulent immigration enforcement. Critics, including members of the United States Congress, argued that ICE's use of masks, plain clothes, and unmarked vehicles without visible identification made it difficult to distinguish between real and fake immigration agents, "inviting perpetrators...to take advantage of the chaos by impersonating masked ICE agents in order to target and sexually assault women". Reported impersonators in several states have threatened deportation while committing robberies, kidnappings, and sexual assaults against women in immigrant communities. Documented incidents occurred in multiple states, including California, Florida, Maryland, New York, North Carolina, Pennsylvania, South Carolina, and Washington, D.C., with perpetrators attempting crimes in person as well as through telephone, text, and online scams.

The Attorney General of California, Rob Bonta, described such impersonations as "bad actors capitalizing on fear", while advocacy groups linked the phenomenon to ICE's own controversial operational practices and have noted that it results in broader hostility toward right-wing politics in the United States. National and local media connected impersonator attacks to violent incidents such as the 2025 shootings of Minnesota legislators. Women's organizations argued that ICE's concealment of officer identities exacerbated risks of sexual abuse.

In response, members of the United States Congress introduced legislation such as the proposed "No Masks for ICE Act", which would prohibit agents from covering their faces during enforcement actions and require visible display of names and agency affiliation. Although impersonating a federal officer is already a crime, the persistence and geographic spread of ICE imposters has drawn scrutiny from civil rights advocates, immigrant groups, and state officials, who describe the issue as a chronic public-safety crisis. Both local and state governments across the United States began to challenge Trump-supported anonymity of government agents in response, raising questions of states' rights against Federal law enforcement in the United States.

== Background and causes ==
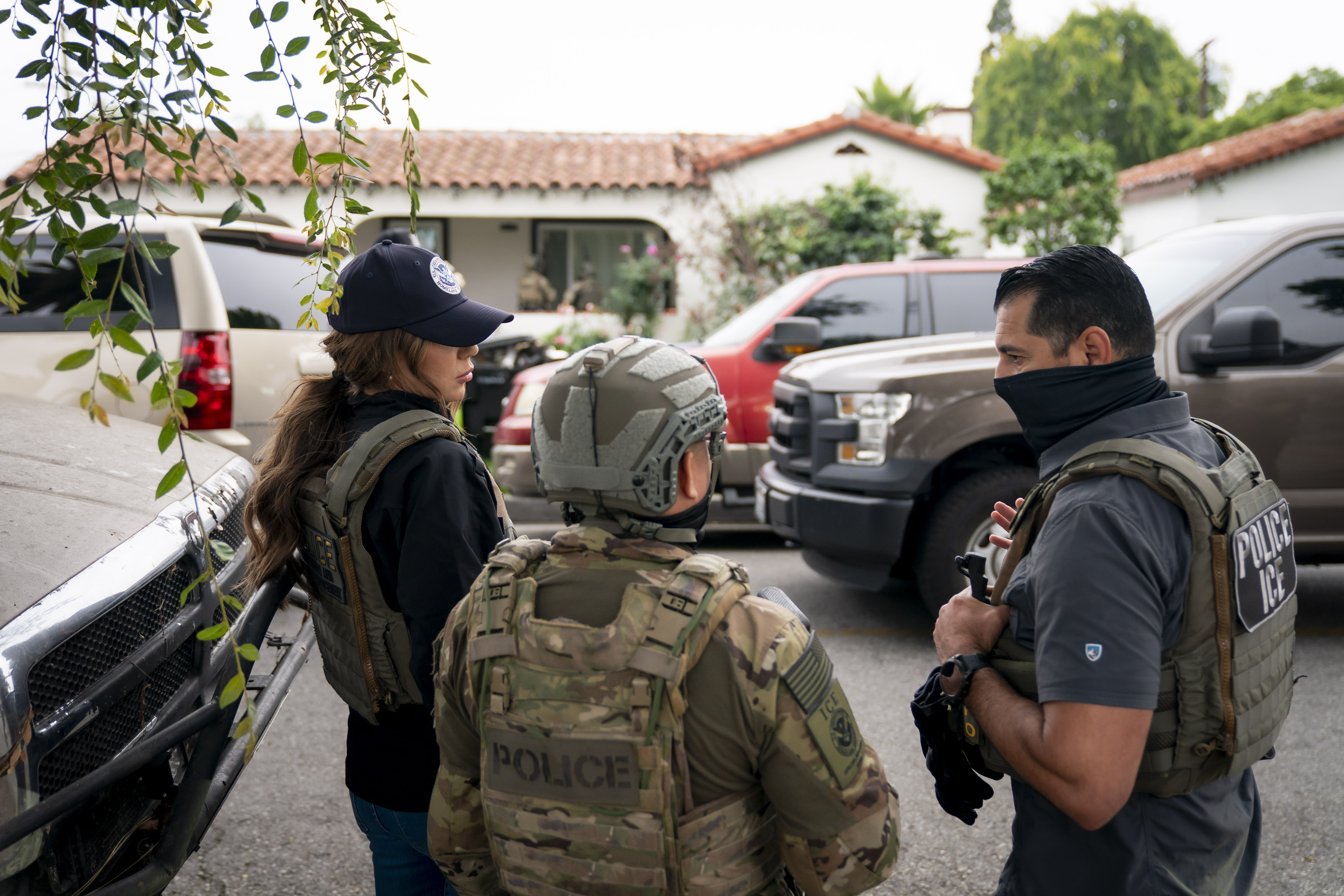
ICE agents during an operation in Los Angeles with Kristi Noem, the Secretary of Homeland Security (left)

=== Increase in immigration policing by Trump ICE ===
During the Second Trump administration, The American Prospect reported what it called "chronic cases" of individuals impersonating United States Immigration and Customs Enforcement (ICE) agents to prey on immigrant communities. A CNN report in February 2025 documented several arrests of people posing as ICE agents during a nationwide immigration crackdown.

According to New York Magazine, President Trump deployed the National Guard and the United States Marine Corps to support federal immigration raids, with military forces "running interference" for ICE operations. In May 2025, Reuters reported that the administration set a daily quota of about 3,000 immigration arrests, a sharp increase from earlier levels.

KTLA reported that dozens of members of the United States Congress signed a letter to the United States Department of Homeland Security expressing concern about ICE officers' tactics and about impersonators targeting women. The proposed "No Masks for ICE Act", introduced in July 2025, sought to prohibit federal immigration agents from covering their faces and to require visible identification, reflecting the absence of such statutory requirements at the time.

=== Chronic ICE impersonators ===
The American Prospect described the volume and frequency of ICE impersonations to commit unlawful actions as "chronic". CNN reported arrests of impersonators in multiple U.S. states. Rob Bonta, the Attorney General of California, confirmed reports of growing numbers of ICE impersonators and said that "bad actors" had begun to "capitalize on the fear" raised among minorities by the Trump administration. PBS NewsHour listed kidnappings, robberies, fraud, and sexual assaults among the incidents linked to impersonators. KTLA reported that ICE had been criticized for agents' failures to identify themselves in anti-immigration operations. According to the Congressional Caucus for Women's Issues, the masking of ICE agents contributed to impersonations and increased exposure of women, especially immigrants, to risk of sexual assault. Arick Fudali of The Bloom Firm told KTLA that the simplicity of ICE agents' actual uniforms, masks, and procedures made it easy for impersonators to exploit victims using the fear and intimidation associated with ICE encounters.

=== Political associations ===
Impersonation of ICE agents to commit crimes and harass persons has been linked in news coverage to the 2025 shootings of Minnesota legislators, where a gunman disguised as law enforcement murdered a Democratic Party elected official, along with her husband and dog. New York magazine noted that Minnesota law enforcement compared the murders to ICE anonymity, quoting Minnesota Department of Public Safety commissioner Bob Jacobson as saying the assassin "had exploited the trust our uniforms are meant to represent". The American Prospect also compared impersonations to attempted attacks on lawful protestors by a masked individual at a No Kings protest. The magazine further reported that impersonators and those attempting to assist ICE actions contributed to societal hostility toward right-wing politics and beliefs, including those advanced by the Republican Party. New York magazine asserted that ICE impersonators took advantage of the promotion of right-wing vigilante violence by the Trumpist movement and the administration.

At the Conservative Political Action Conference in 2025, Jason Selvig of the political comedy group The Good Liars interviewed an attendee dressed in an "ICE" outfit with a Make America Great Again hat. According to The American Prospect, the attendee said he celebrated being able to instill fear into Hispanic-American populations by wearing the outfit to "a Home Depot in a sanctuary city". Ms. magazine reported that right-wing extremists also wore ICE costumes in predominantly Latino workplaces and neighborhoods, including in San Francisco, California, to instill fear across immigrant communities.

=== Anonymity of law enforcement ===
ICE's predominant use of masks to hide the identities of its agents was reported to have made it easier for impersonators to pose as ICE personnel. The Refugee and Immigrant Center for Education and Legal Services said it was difficult to determine the extent of historical under-reporting of interactions with law enforcement in the United States. The Charleston Hispanic Association told CNN that harassment of Hispanic-Americans had become commonplace but was not often reported or recorded. According to KNBC, California and other states began pursuing legislation to restrict the use of masks by law enforcement in response to the presence of both masked ICE agents and impersonators. The Los Angeles Times also reported that criminals posing as ICE attempted to commit crimes by "phone, text, email or on social media".

Arick Fudali of The Bloom Firm told KTLA, "[to migrants] it doesn't sound out of the ordinary for someone like that to wield their power to exploit and sexually abuse someone. And what are [the women] going to do?" The Los Angeles Times noted that impersonating a federal officer is a crime. Kristi Noem, the United States Secretary of Homeland Security, defended the ability of ICE agents to keep their identities secret, citing their safety over that of the public. New York magazine reported that ICE leadership said anonymity was necessary to protect agents from public oversight and repercussions. Scott Wiener, a member of the California State Senate, compared the situation to "secret police". At the Alabama Sheriffs Association's summer conference, an ICE official said agents were seen as "imperial thugs" because they enforce immigration laws and argued that concealment was necessary for their safety, stating, "People get followed around. Now your kid cannot sit at the lunch table with other kids at school because of what I do for my job, which I think is very valuable".

== Incidents ==
=== 2025 ===
- Durham, North Carolina: A fake ICE truck was used to harass people at a grocery store in a predominantly Hispanic area.
- Raleigh, North Carolina: A man was arrested for impersonating an ICE agent and sexually assaulting a woman. The attack occurred at a local Motel 6 on January 26. Acting as an ICE agent, he threatened the woman with deportation if she did not have sex with him and presented fake credentials. He also claimed to be a sworn law enforcement officer and was in possession of cocaine and a pipe. Siembra NC, an immigrant rights advocacy group, said the attack was part of a broader targeting of immigrants through such scams. He was charged with "kidnapping, second-degree rape and impersonating a law enforcement officer".
- Sullivan's Island, South Carolina: A man allegedly impersonated ICE to harass and mock a group of Latino men on January 29. During the incident, which was recorded, the impostor used his vehicle to trap the men, took their car keys, and threatened to deport them. The suspect was charged with kidnapping. According to CNN, he reportedly stated, "Now don't be speaking that pig-Latin in my fucking country!". The man, Sean-Michael Emmrich Johnson, later pleaded guilty to breach of the peace and impersonating an officer and was sentenced to three years probation and community service after expressing remorse.
- Philadelphia, Pennsylvania: Two men were accused of attempting to enter a Temple University dormitory and nearby business on February 1 while posing as ICE agents. One of the two, a Temple student, was charged with impersonating an officer.
- Brooklyn, New York: On February 11, a woman was assaulted by a civilian disguised as an ICE agent.
- Fresno, California: Two men were arrested for confronting and filming people at a shopping center while wearing tactical vests on February 26.
- Fife, Washington: Police investigated a fake ICE patrol vehicle that targeted Emish Market, a Ukrainian grocery store, on March 16. The vehicle bore an ICE logo and verbiage, with visible text of "DELIVERY" beneath it, no license plates, and the visible text of "1775" and "911". The vehicle immediately fled when confronted by store security.
- Newbury Park, California: An ICE impostor attempted to intimidate Hispanic people at a taqueria on March 17.
- Indiantown, Florida: A man allegedly impersonated an ICE officer and targeted immigrants at a fake traffic stop on April 3, where he asked drivers for their documents and immigration status. The man threatened Hispanic-Americans with deportation and was charged with impersonating a federal law enforcement agent.
- Upper Grand Lagoon, Florida: A woman was arrested for kidnapping her ex-boyfriend's wife. According to police, on April 10, the woman approached the victim at the hotel she worked at and identified herself as an ICE agent and sheriff's deputy. The suspect drove the victim to an apartment complex, where the victim fled to a neighbor's apartment and called police. The suspect was arrested on April 21.
- Queens, New York: An NYPD officer was charged in federal court with impersonating an ICE agent. According to court documents, in April 2025 the officer called a woman and, while posing as the ICE field director, ordered her to report to ICE by the 15th.
- Huntington Park, California: A man was arrested on June 24 for allegedly posing as a federal immigration officer. Police discovered the materials in his vehicle after impounding his car. When searched, the man had a "loaded gun and official-looking documents with Department of Homeland Security headings in his SUV" along with "multiple copies of passports not registered under the individual's name". He was charged with possession of the allegedly unregistered firearm and released on bail. The man denied the allegations.
- Los Angeles County, California: Masked men impersonating ICE detained the godson of a Los Angeles County Board of Supervisors staffer, telling him, "nice truck for someone with that surname". The incident was confirmed by the Los Angeles Times. The men were denied access to the vehicle and fled when a crowd began recording the attack. Supervisor Kathryn Barger issued a warning in a June 17 council meeting for the public to be aware of ICE impersonators.
- Philadelphia, Pennsylvania: A man robbed a store while impersonating an ICE official on June 8. The impostor zip-tied a store employee and stole $1,000 in cash.
- Houston, Texas: A man was robbed by a fake ICE agent conducting an illegal traffic roadblock on June 23.
- Milton, Delaware: The Delaware State Police reported that two ICE impostors committed armed robbery after pulling the victim over on June 28. The impostors, wearing ICE clothing, detained a U.S. citizen at knife and gunpoint, then struck and robbed the victim.
- Lewisburg, Pennsylvania: ICE impostors entered a private business, attempted to extract information about employees, and refused to provide warrants or proof of identity, according to the Buffalo Valley Regional Police Department. The department sent out a news release on July 19.
- New York City, New York: Three men dressed as ICE agents restrained two restaurant employees and robbed an ATM on August 7.
- Colorado Springs, Colorado: Employees at a DoorDash storefront reported a delivery driver for impersonating an ICE agent while picking up an order on August 27, allegedly displaying a fake badge. The suspect was arrested the following day after a stand-off.
- Galveston, Texas: On November 9, two men were live-streaming when they noticed two other men being detained. As they approached, the man who had detained the detainees let them go. When the witnesses confronted the suspect, he allegedly grabbed a badge and assaulted one of the witnesses with it. The suspect was later arrested and charged with impersonation, and police stated there may have been more victims.
- Sacramento, California: A 19-year-old man was arrested for assault and impersonating an ICE agent on November 10. The suspect is accused of driving an SUV and shouting "ICE raid" before striking a Sacramento State University student with an SUV in a campus parking garage. Police said the suspect's SUV had police lights and sirens on it.
- Houston, Texas: A church employee was charged with extortion and impersonating an ICE agent in an incident that occurred on November 20. According to authorities, the man went to a massage business and was told he could not pay for it with a credit card. The man allegedly pulled out an ICE badge and demanded the employee pay him $500 over Zelle or else he would arrest her.
- Woodbridge, Virginia: Police were called to an apartment on December 10 for a report of a man wearing an ICE vest who was banging on a door at an apartment complex. The Prince William County Police Department confirmed with ICE that the man was not a real agent. As of December 11 police were still searching for the suspect.

=== 2026 ===
- San Diego, California: A Mexican man driving a Ford F-150 followed a Border Patrol agent during an operation in Linda Vista on January 8. The man's truck had a Border Patrol sticker on the windshield and a license plate frame with "federal agent" on it, spelled incorrectly. The real agent aborted his mission when he saw the fake agent following him, believing other agents were responding. When real agents confronted the man, he shouted obscenities and told the officers to leave the Linda Vista community.
- Pittsburgh, Pennsylvania: A burglary suspect was arrested on January 17. A juvenile reported that the man broke in through a kitchen window and claimed to be from ICE before threatening him with a pocketknife. The juvenile knocked the suspect unconscious before officers arrived and arrested him.
- Newark, New Jersey: A man was arrested for allegedly committing two robberies while impersonating an ICE agent on January 22 and 24. The second victim reported there were two suspects, one of whom had a jacket with "ICE" written on the inside. One suspect was arrested on January 26.
- Dearborn, Michigan: A man was reported for impersonating an ICE agent at a Kroger store on January 31. The impersonator reportedly asked several customers and employees about their immigration status.
- San Diego, California: A man was arrested for grabbing a La Jolla McDonald's manager by the neck on February 12. Other employees dragged the man away from the manager. In a video, the man identifies himself as an ICE agent, though employees said they recognized him and knew he was not an officer.
- Honolulu, Hawaii: A man wearing an ICE vest was involved in a fight with several teenagers in the Waikiki neighborhood on March 28. A DHS spokesperson said the man was not an agent. One teenager involved in the fight was charged with assault.
- Portland, Oregon: A man was arrested on March 29 for allegedly attempting to rob a 7-Eleven while impersonating an ICE agent. The store clerk said the suspect demanded money from the register, threatening to have the clerk's family deported. The suspect allegedly showed the clerk a fake ID that was actually a TriMet Hop card with a police badge sticker on it. When arrested, the suspect claimed he was threatened into attempting the robbery by a man named "Tim".
- Cincinnati, Ohio: Gratis Police Chief Tonina Lamanna and an officer came to three high schools in Cincinnati on April 15, saying they were there to perform wellness checks on specific students on behalf of ICE. The town of Gratis, about an hour north of Cincinnati, has an agreement with ICE that allows limited immigration authority to Gratis Police officers, but only within the department's jurisdiction.
- Balcones Heights, Texas: Police arrested a woman on June 16 for portraying herself as an ICE agent after being pulled over.
- Miami Gardens, Florida: In September, a Colombian national was charged with impersonating an ICE agent and attempting to extort a food truck owner.
- Woodburn, Oregon: On July 17, a woman reported being pulled over by three men, who forcibly removed her from her car and put her in the back of their vehicle before letting her go. The woman said the car had red-and-blue lights and that the men were wearing tactical vests with "POLICE" written on them.

== Governmental and legislative responses ==
=== Local ===
Following the arrest of a man impersonating ICE to commit crimes in Huntington Park, California, the city government required all city police to engage and force identification of any federal law enforcement seen to be operating within the city.

Police in Spokane, Washington, under chief Kevin Hall, issued new policies for city police to verify detected federal law enforcement due to local threats of ICE impersonators.

=== State ===
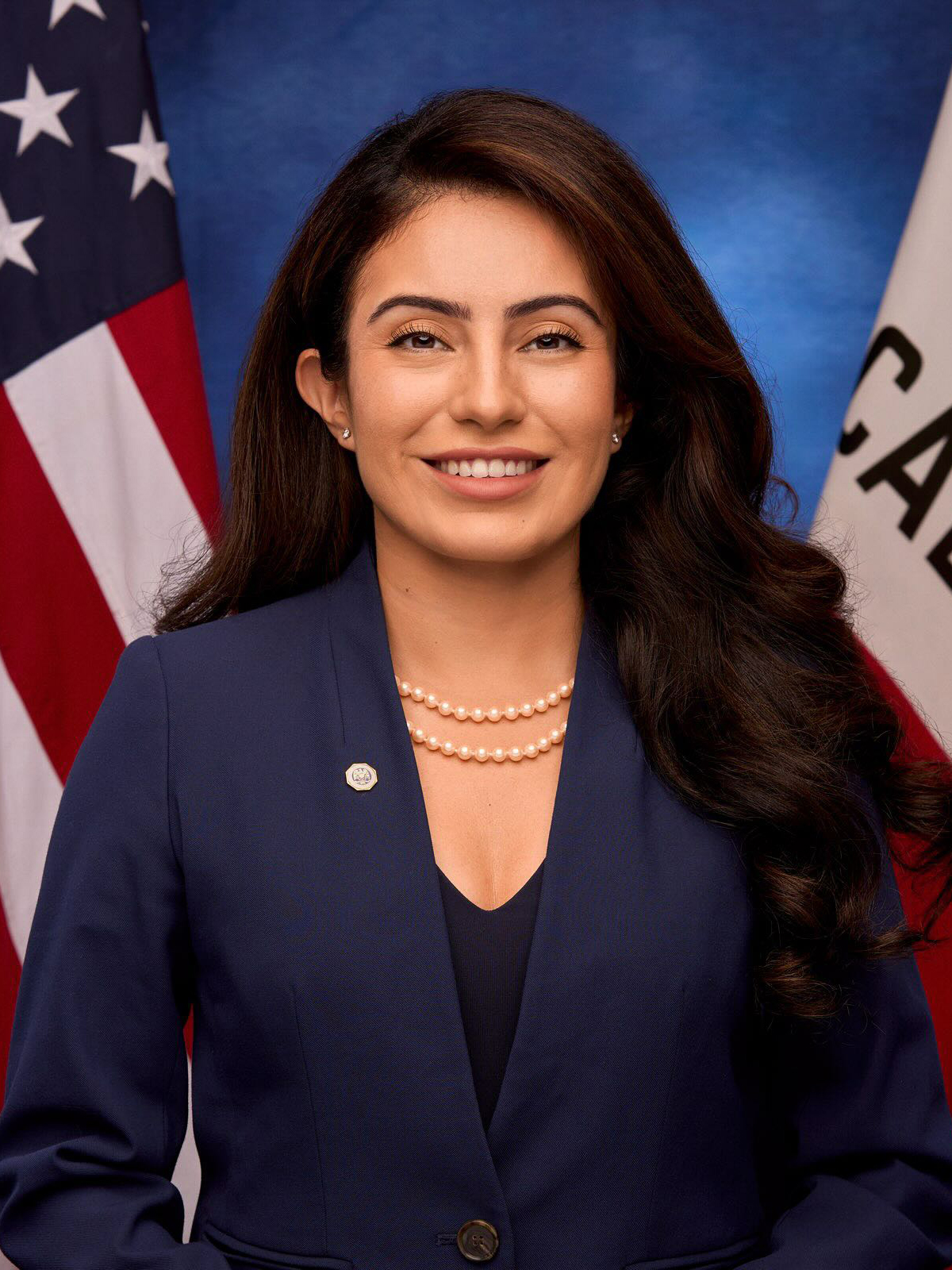
Sasha Renée Pérez in 2024. She later introduced the No Vigilantes Act.

Sasha Renée Pérez of the California State Senate introduced the "No Vigilantes Act". SB 805, if passed, would mandate that any federal law enforcement acting in California provide "last name, badge or ID number" upon demand. Pérez asked, "How am I supposed to be able to tell if this is actually federal law enforcement or if this is a vigilante who's impersonating an ICE officer?". On the matter of doxing allegations of federal law enforcement, she noted that California state, county, and local law have had matching requirements for years without issue.

In Massachusetts, a bipartisan group of state lawmakers identified ICE impersonators and masked or anonymous law enforcement as a danger to state residents. In response, led by Bruce Tarr, the Republican leader of the Massachusetts Senate, state senators filed a bill to modify state law, closing a loophole that only criminalized impersonating local, county, or state-level law enforcement. Under the changes, it would be a state crime in Massachusetts to impersonate federal officials.

=== Federal ===
In response to various incidents, Congresswoman Nydia Velázquez, a Democrat from New York, introduced the "No Masks for ICE Act". The bill would "make it illegal for federal agents to cover their faces while conducting immigration enforcement unless the masks were required for their safety or their health" and would require "agents to clearly display their name and agency affiliation on their clothes during arrests and enforcement operations". The measure was co-sponsored by Representative Laura Friedman but had no Republican co-sponsors.

== See also ==
- Detention and deportation of American citizens in the second Trump administration
- Immigration detention in the United States
- Immigration policy of the second Trump administration
- Your papers, please – Expression associated with police state functionaries
