= Deportations of U.S. citizens in the second Trump administration =

Deaths, detentions and deportations of American citizens in 2025-2026
- Immigration enforcement actions involving U.S. citizens Part of the deportation in the second Trump administration and immigration policy of the second Trump administration
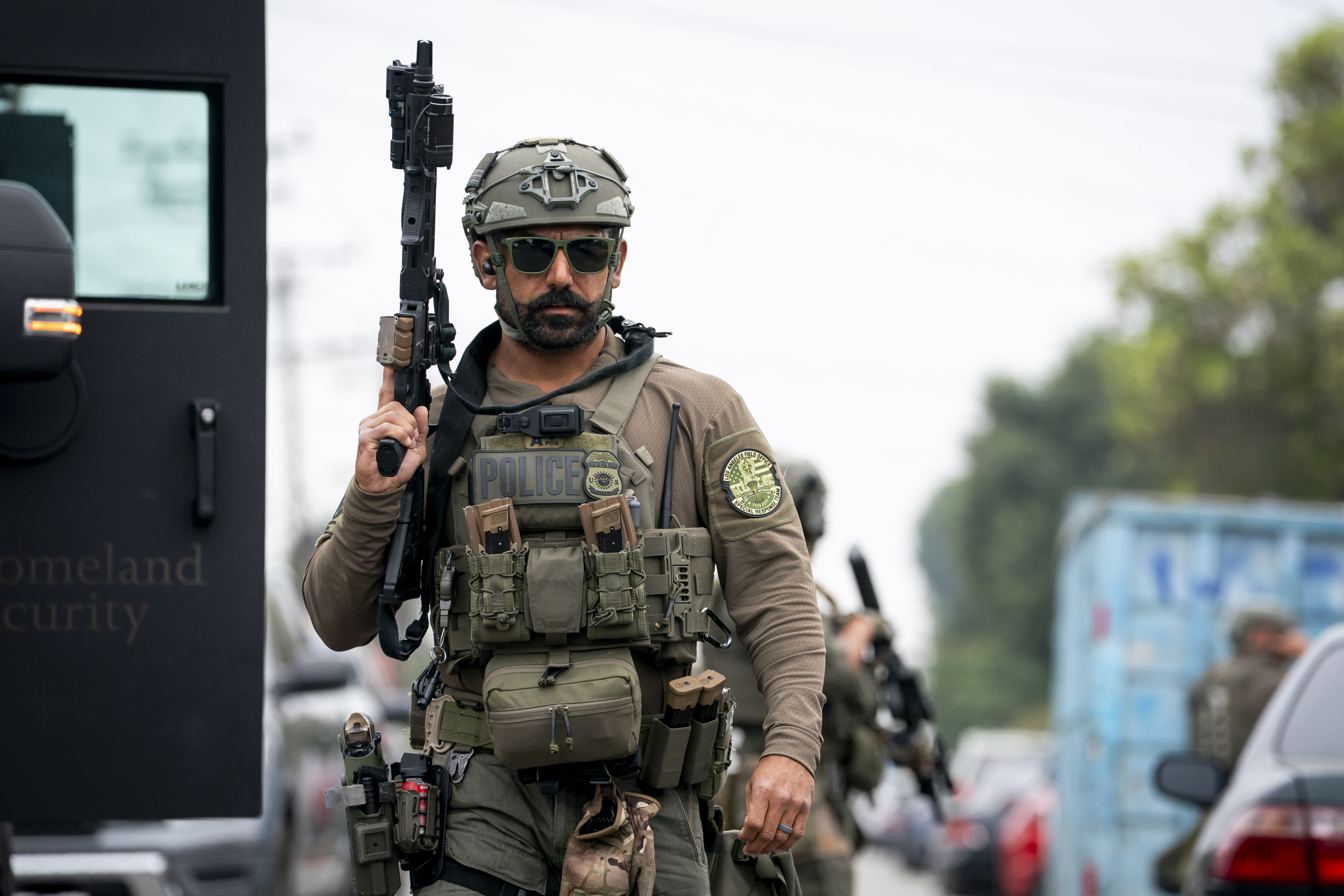
- ICE in Los Angeles, California (June 12, 2025)
- Date: January 20, 2025–present
- Location: United States (nationwide)
- Caused by: Second presidency of Donald Trump; Trumpism, Right-wing populism, and democratic backsliding during Trump's second term.; Federal immigration enforcement policies and operations affecting U.S. citizens.; Mass-deportation drive and reduced safeguards described as leading to U.S. citizens being swept up in enforcement actions.
- Goals: Increased immigration enforcement and removals.; Expansion of detention and denaturalization initiatives (as described in reporting and administration statements).
- Methods: Raids and street detentions.; Arrests and "collateral arrests".; Immigration detention; Removal actions.; Denaturalization proceedings.; Notices instructing recipients to "self-deport".
- Status: Legal challenges.; Civil-rights crisis and congressional challenges.; Court and independent findings described as identifying legal violations in some enforcement practices.; Public controversy over proposals related to detaining citizens in foreign prisons and expanded denaturalization.; Mass violations of court orders by Federal government.; Mass arrests of protestors and political opposition.

Parties
U.S. Federal government; U.S. Department of Homeland Security (DHS); U.S. Immigration and Customs Enforcement (ICE); U.S. Customs and Border Protection (CBP); U.S. Department of Justice (DOJ)	U.S. citizens: Communities; Civil-rights advocates; Congressional oversight efforts; Political organizations

Lead figures
White House: Donald Trump; JD Vance; Stephen Miller; Tom Homan; Marco Rubio; DHS: Kristi Noem; Troy Edgar; ICE: Todd Lyons; Charles Wall; CBP: Rodney S. Scott; Joseph N. Mazzara; Gregory Bovino; DOJ: Pam Bondi; Todd Blanche; Stanley Woodward Jr.	Non-centralized (multiple individuals and communities)

Casualties and losses
Arrested/detained: none; Dead: none	Arrested/detained: 170+ citizens detained; Dead: 3 U.S. citizens shot and killed by ICE or Border Patrol (Note: U.S. citizen Ruben Ray Martinez was killed in South Padre Island, Texas on March 15, 2025 by an ICE agent. U.S. citizen and Minneapolis, Minnesota resident Renée Good was shot and killed during an ICE operation on January 7, 2026. U.S. citizen Alex Pretti was killed in Minneapolis by ICE agents on January 24, 2026.)

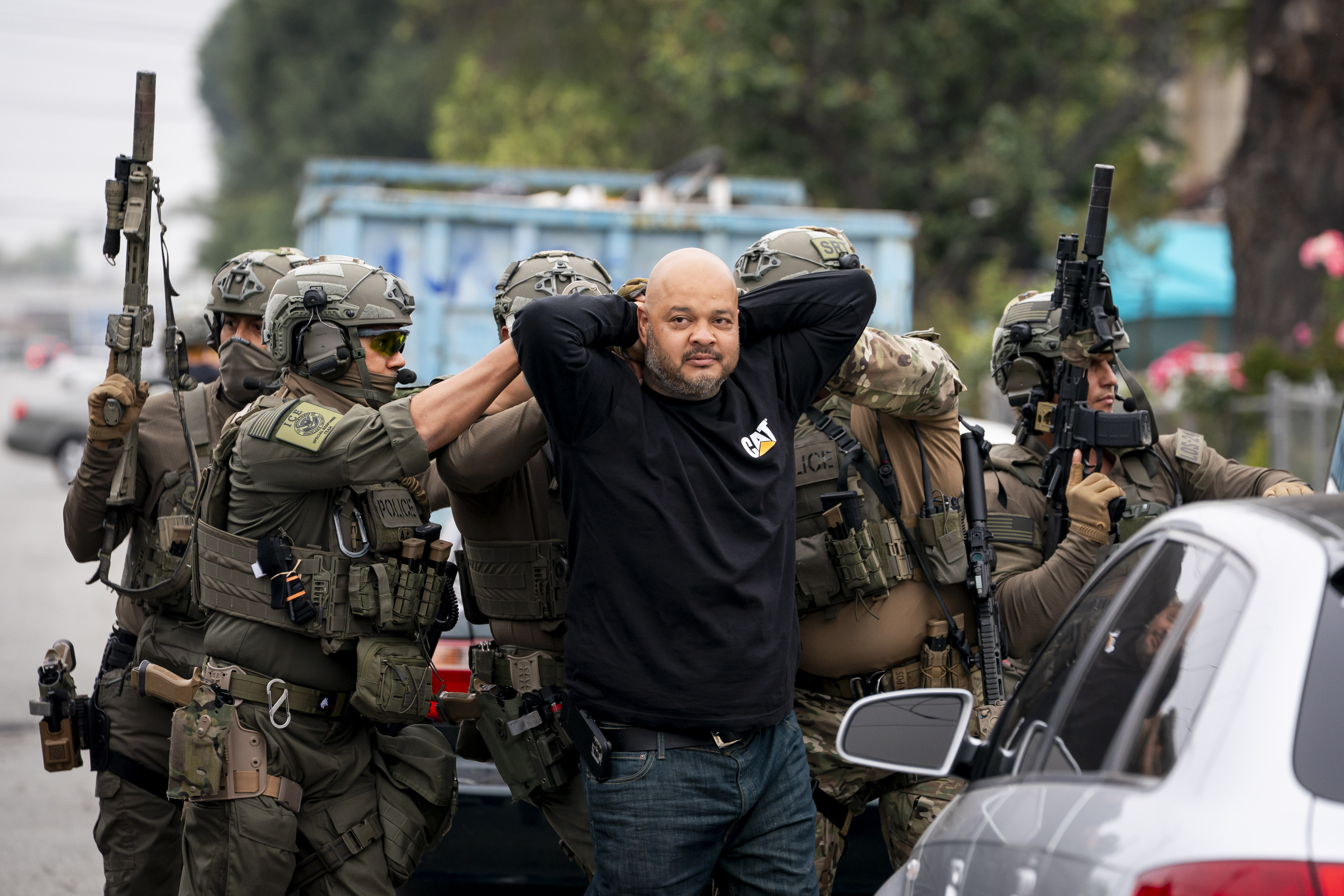
ICE agents and a man being detained

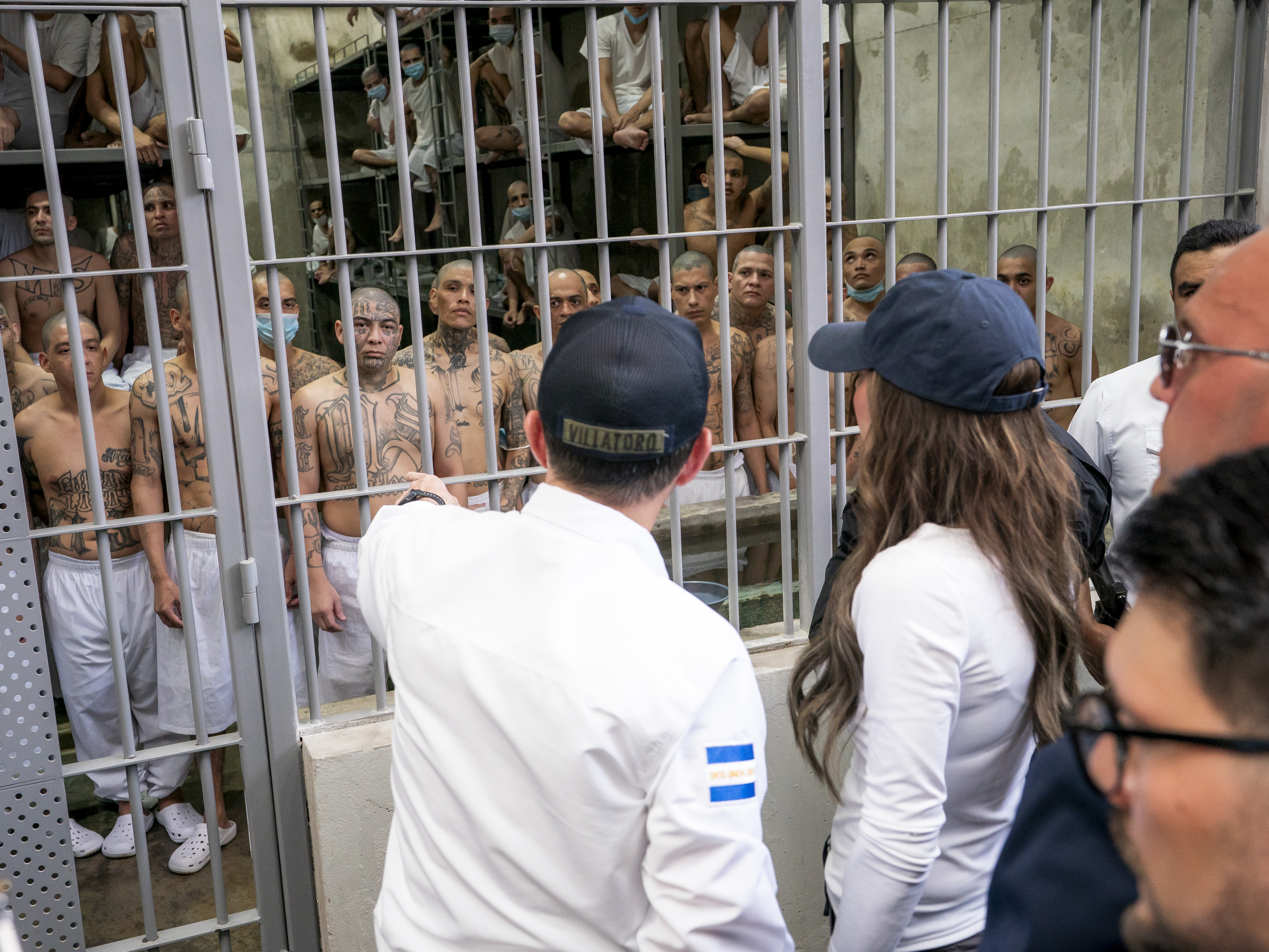
U.S. Secretary of Homeland Security Kristi Noem observes prisoners at CECOT, a Salvadoran prison noted for human rights abuses. President Donald Trump proposed imprisoning American citizens there.

During the second presidency of Donald Trump, federal immigration enforcement policies and operations have resulted in the documented arrest, death, detention, and removal of American citizens. As of October 2025, the U.S. government was not tracking the number of detained or missing citizens, but ProPublica confirmed at least 170 citizen detentions by that time. The deportation of U.S. citizens from the United States is illegal. (Note: See the history of laws concerning immigration and naturalization in the United States, including the Fourteenth Amendment to the United States Constitution, the Immigration and Nationality Act, Title 8 of the United States Code, and Afroyim v. Rusk (1967).)

High-profile detention cases of American citizens include arrests of elected officials, disabled adults and children, and Puerto Rican and Indigenous people. Donald Trump has voiced support for the denaturalization of American citizens and the detainment of citizens in foreign prisons noted for human rights abuses.

Congressional Democrats have challenged the Trump administration to justify the detention of U.S. citizens and have been blocked by the Trump administration from investigating, passing laws limiting abuses, or overseeing immigration actions affecting U.S. citizens. President Trump, other Republicans, and administration officials alternately confirmed, defended, and denied reports of American citizens being arrested, deported, and detained. Immigration and Customs Enforcement (ICE) was confirmed by independent review and U.S. judges to have violated laws including the Immigration Act of 1990 by interrogating and detaining people without warrants or review of their citizenship status.

The Trump administration's treatment of U.S. citizens has raised concerns among civil rights advocates. Some activists have compared the impact of ICE on American citizens to concentration camps such as Manzanar, where Japanese-Americans were interned during World War II. Between 110,000 and 120,000 U.S. citizens were imprisoned by the U.S. government during the internment of Japanese Americans for political reasons from 1942 to 1945. The Cato Institute called Trump's immigration policies damaging to American interests. Legal and immigration experts have stated that these legal violations were caused by Trump administration pressure to deport people quickly without safeguards.

== Background ==
=== ICE history of deporting or detaining citizens ===
The Government Accountability Office (GAO), an independent non-partisan agency of the United States Congress, found that up to 70 U.S. citizens were deported by ICE between 2015 and 2020. In the same time period, ICE was confirmed to have arrested 674 potential U.S. citizens and detained 121. Investigators determined that both ICE and U.S. Customs and Border Protection (CBP) maintain poor and insufficient records, and that the numbers may be higher. The GAO found that ICE has defects and loopholes in their training and operations. The Transactional Records Access Clearinghouse found ICE named 2,840 U.S. citizens as eligible for deportation between 2002 and 2017. Of those, 214 citizens were arrested by ICE. Based on research and surveys of immigration attorneys, Jacqueline Stevens of Northwestern University estimated that 1% of all ICE detainees are U.S. citizens, based on pre-2025 numbers, but that the rates would increase under the second Trump administration's more aggressive immigrant deportation program. The American Immigration Lawyers Association states that ICE and CBP have a documented history of racism and racial profiling among their rank and file.

=== Proposed transfer of U.S. citizens to foreign prisons ===
Despite longstanding legal prohibitions against deporting American citizens, President Trump explored the possibility of transferring citizens convicted of crimes to foreign prisons during his second presidential term. Trump publicly stated numerous times that his administration was examining whether such actions could be legally pursued.

Under the law of the United States, a U.S. citizen cannot legally be deported and has the legal right to return to the United States at any time. Prior to the second Trump administration, some academic studies attempted to count the number of unlawful detention and deportations of American citizens that had previously occurred; one study estimated that from 2003 to 2011 more than 20,000 Americans were incorrectly detained or deported by immigration officials.

Beginning with his second presidential administration, Trump pushed for mass deportations along with reducing safeguards to stop inappropriate detentions and deportations. This process resulted in American citizens becoming entangled in enforcement efforts. New York magazine described the problem as, "[i]t's not a matter of if U.S. citizens are getting caught up in President Donald Trump's immigration crackdown and mass-deportation efforts but, rather, how and how many."

==== El Salvador offer to imprison U.S. citizens ====
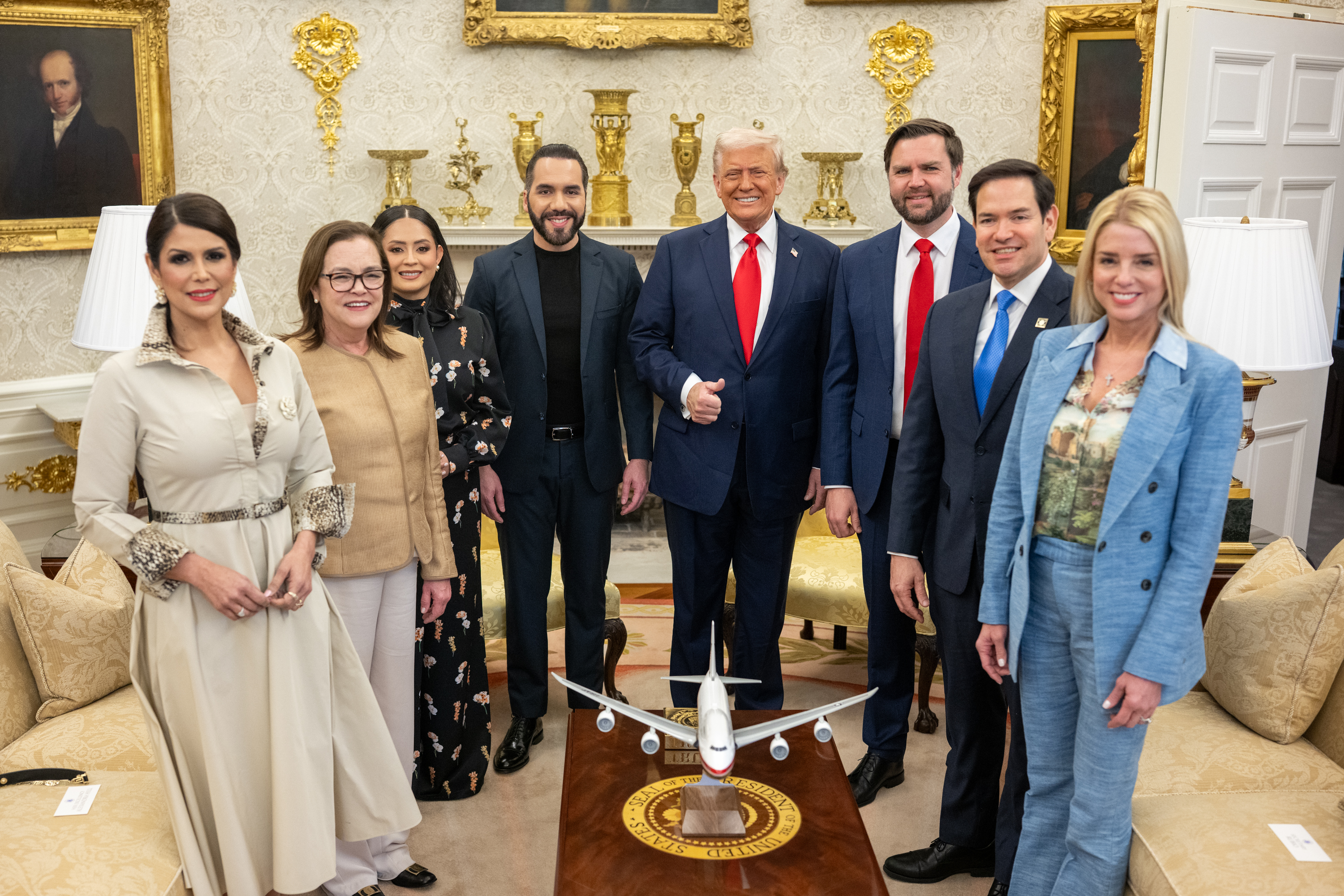
President Trump and President Nayib Bukele of El Salvador (April 14, 2025), joined by JD Vance, Marco Rubio, and Pam Bondi at media event where discussions of the Trump administration jailing Americans in foreign prisons occurred

While visiting the White House on February 4, 2025, Salvadoran president Nayib Bukele stated his willingness to house people of any nationality detained by the United States, including American citizens, in the maximum security Terrorism Confinement Center (CECOT) in El Salvador for payment. He confirmed the statement on X, writing that he had offered the U.S. "the opportunity to outsource part of its prison system". Although the U.S. government cannot legally deport U.S. citizens, Secretary of State Marco Rubio said that the administration would study whether the U.S. Constitution and laws would enable the administration to do so.

Rubio called the offer "very generous", noting that it was the first time another country had made such an offer, and that it would cost a fraction of imprisoning criminals in the U.S. prison system. Trump said that he was looking into whether he could move forward with the offer, telling reporters, "if we had a legal right to do it, I would do it in a heartbeat." Trump also stated that he was not sure whether that legal right existed, and that the administration was assessing it. Trump said the cost of incarcerating American prisoners in other countries would be much less than that of imprisoning people in the U.S., and in addition, "it would be a great deterrent." He said that several countries had already agreed to host American prisoners.

Elon Musk called the proposal a "Great idea!!" on X. Rubio specified that this would apply to dangerous criminals. However, Politico noted that Bukele said on X that El Salvador would gladly take U.S. ex-senator Bob Menendez, who was serving an 11-year prison sentence for bribery but who was not a violent criminal. In March 2025, iresponse to a spate of incidents involving vandalizing Teslas, Trump suggested that such "terrorist thugs" could be sent to Salvadoran prisons.

Ahead of Bukele's White House visit in April 2025, Trump confirmed that they would discuss sending Americans to El Salvador's prisons and stated, "if they can house these horrible criminals for a lot less money than it costs us, I'm all for it." When Trump met with Bukele at the White House on April 14, they continued to discuss the topic of sending Americans to CECOT, with Trump exploring its legality.

During the visit, Trump and Bukele discussed the deportation of Kilmar Abrego Garcia, which courts and news outlets described as illegal. In this context, Trump was quoted as advocating for the deportation of U.S. citizens, telling Bukele: "Home-growns are next. The home-growns. You gotta build about five more places. It's not big enough."

==== Analysis of moving citizens to foreign jails ====
Insha Rahman, vice president of advocacy for the Vera Institute of Justice, stated that no reasonable reading of "the Constitution or due process" would allow the President to send American citizens to serve their time in foreign prisons. Lauren-Brooke Eisen, the senior director of the justice program at the Brennan Center for Justice, told Politico that the proposal would be illegal because it violates the Eighth Amendment to the U.S. Constitution, which prohibits cruel and unusual punishment, as well as the First Step Act, which requires Americans sentenced to prison to serve in facilities that are "as close as practicable to the prisoner's primary residence, and to the extent practicable, in a facility within 500 driving miles of that residence."

The BBC noted that while U.S. citizens are technically afforded legal protection from deportation, it is possible for naturalized citizens to be denaturalized. This can happen when the citizenship was fraudulently obtained, and thus, citizens suspected of ties to criminal gangs or terrorist organizations, such as Tren de Aragua or MS-13, could, in theory, be stripped of citizenship and then deported after due process. Citizens born in the U.S. cannot be denaturalized.

=== Proposals to denaturalize citizens ===
Besides researching whether the Trump administration could send American citizens to foreign prisons, the Trump administration also was looking into stripping citizenship away and deporting certain citizens through the denaturalization process as reported in July 2025. The Department of Justice wrote in a memorandum that the civil division is going to "prioritize and maximally pursue denaturalization proceedings in all cases permitted by law and supported by the evidence."

In June 2025, United States Representative Andy Ogles called for Uganda-born US citizen Zohran Mamdani, then-candidate in elections for Mayor of New York City, to be denaturalized and expelled from the United States.

In July 2025, President Trump threatened to denaturalize comedian and long-standing critic Rosie O'Donnell, who was born in New York state and holds dual United States and Irish citizenship.

In December 2025, it was reported that USCIS guidance, issued the same month, said that the Office of Immigration Litigation be supplied with "100–200 denaturalization cases per month" in the 2026 fiscal year. Previously, from 2017–2025, "just over 120 cases" had been filed. Immigrants may be denaturalized under federal law only if they have committed fraud while applying for citizenship. In most cases they would be granted legal permanent residence. In 2025, the Justice Department brought thirteen such cases and won eight of them.

== Deaths ==
=== Renée Good ===
On January 7, 2026, Renée Nicole Macklin Good, a 37-year-old American woman, was fatally shot by United States Immigration and Customs Enforcement (ICE) agent Jonathan Ross (Note: At the time of the shooting, Ross worked as an officer under the Office of Enforcement and Removal Operations (ERO) of ICE, which is the directorate in charge of detentions and deportations. ICE agent is commonly used by English-language speakers and media to refer to ERO officers. Ross was identified by cross-referencing statements made by federal officials concerning a dragging incident the shooter was involved in with court documents. His name had not been released by federal authorities.) in Minneapolis, Minnesota, during Operation Metro Surge. Good was in her car stopped sideways in the street, which led Ross to circle her vehicle on foot. Other agents approached, and one ordered her to get out of the car while reaching through her open window. Good briefly reversed, then began moving forward and to the right, into the direction of traffic. At this point, Ross was at the front-left of the vehicle which was turning away, when he fired three shots, killing her. The killing sparked national protests and multiple investigations.

Department of Homeland Security officials, Acting Attorney General Todd Blanche, and President Donald Trump defended the shooting, saying the agent acted in self-defense, that Good ran him over, and that the agent was recovering in a hospital. Their accounts of the shooting were contested by eyewitnesses, journalists, federal prosecutors, and Democratic Party lawmakers, some of whom called for criminal proceedings against Ross. The president and federal officials were criticized for espousing conclusions before any investigation had occurred. Minneapolis mayor Jacob Frey and Minnesota governor Tim Walz called on ICE to end their presence in the city.

The killing sparked widespread protests in Minneapolis and in cities across the country including Chicago, New York City, Los Angeles, San Francisco, Seattle, and Washington, D.C. Marches in Minneapolis prompted the closing of public schools and the deployment of more police officers. Federal agents used tear gas and pepper spray against protesters, and Governor Walz placed the National Guard on standby.

Leaders of the Department of Justice (DOJ)'s Civil Rights Division declined to open a constitutional investigation, which led more than a dozen federal prosecutors in Minneapolis and Washington to resign in protest. Minnesota attorney general Keith Ellison, along with the cities of Minneapolis and Saint Paul, filed suit against the Department of Homeland Security (DHS) to halt ICE deployments. The incident intensified national debate over immigration enforcement and renewed calls to abolish ICE.

=== Ruben Ray Martinez ===
On March 15, 2025, San Antonio resident Martinez, 23, and his friend went to South Padre Island, Texas on a spring break trip. Officers from HSI were assisting local police in directing traffic after an accident. ICE documents claimed Martinez did not initially respond to commands to stop, then accelerated forward, hitting an agent. Another agent, later identified as Jack C. Stevens, after being struck and damaging the driver-side mirror, fired three shots through the open driver's side window, killing Martinez. Lawyers for Martinez's family say that eyewitness accounts were not consistent with the government's report, and Martinez's mother said a Texas Rangers investigator told her there was video of the shooting that contradicted the federal account. Although local sources reported on the shooting in March 2025 shortly after it occurred, ICE's involvement was not disclosed until internal documents were obtained as part of a Freedom of Information Act lawsuit by the watchdog group American Oversight in February 2026.

Days after the shooting was disclosed, Martinez's friend Joshua Orta, the only passenger in the car with Martinez and only known eyewitness of the shooting, was killed in an unrelated highway collision in San Antonio. Orta had disputed the official narrative given by the DHS of the incident and had planned to assist with further inquiries into the shooting. Orta stated that Martinez drank several shots and a beer and smoked marijuana and in the video, Martinez was seen briefly holding an open bottle of alcohol. Autopsy reports indicate that Martinez exceeded the legal alcohol limit to drive. After Orta's death, a county grand jury declined to hand up indictments in the case.

The Texas Department of Public Safety released body camera and surveillance videos of the incident in March 2026. The videos showed what The New York Times described as "a chaotic and confusing scene" that omitted the time of the shooting. While government spokespeople cited the grand jury decision, attorneys representing Martinez's mother claimed the newly-released evidence showed "no justification" for the shooting and pledged to continue their "pursuit of full transparency." However, Martinez's mother, who supports Trump, does not blame Trump for her son's death, saying Trump "wasn't the one who pulled the trigger," although she did call for further accountability within ICE: "But I do think that something needs to be changed in that department as far as the pattern of violence or abuse and impunity."

=== Alex Pretti ===
On January 24, 2026, Alex Jeffrey Pretti, a 37-year-old American intensive care nurse for the United States Department of Veterans Affairs, was shot multiple times and killed by two United States Customs and Border Protection officers in Minneapolis, Minnesota. The incident occurred amid widespread protests against Operation Metro Surge and against the killing of Renée Good on January 7 by a United States Immigration and Customs Enforcement agent.

Pretti was filming law enforcement agents with his phone and directing traffic. At one point, he stood between an agent and a woman the agent had pushed to the ground, putting his arm around the woman. He was then pepper sprayed and wrestled to the ground by federal agents, with several surrounding him when he was shot and killed. Bystander video verified and reviewed by Reuters, the BBC, The Wall Street Journal, and the Associated Press (AP) shows an agent removing a gun from Pretti's holster and moving away from Pretti roughly one second before another agent fires at him. AP reported that a voice can be heard saying "gun, gun" right before the first shot. The shooters were later identified as agent Jesus Ochoa and officer Raymundo Gutierrez.

Pretti was legally licensed to carry a handgun. In reviewing video evidence, Reuters, the BBC, The New York Times, CNN, and The Guardian all concluded that he was holding a cell phone, not a gun, in the moments before being tackled and pinned to the ground. Two agents appear to have shot at him at least ten times within five seconds, continuing after he lay motionless. A civilian recounted how nearly two dozen witnesses to the shooting were taken to and detained at the federally controlled Whipple Building for hours before being released. As with the Renée Good case, state investigators were denied access to the shooting scene by the federal government.

The Trump administration initially alleged, without presenting evidence, that Pretti was a domestic terrorist and out to massacre law enforcement, though these claims were contradicted by video evidence and witness testimony. The shooting accelerated ongoing protests against US immigration forces locally and nationally. The killing and the government's defense provoked widespread criticism, including from Republicans, forcing Trump to attempt a course correction. This move has been viewed with skepticism by local activists, who expect continued immigration enforcement in the region. Comments by Trump administration officials denouncing Pretti's possession of a firearm were condemned by gun rights groups, such as the National Rifle Association (NRA) and Gun Owners of America (GOA), which cited his rights under the Second Amendment.

== Deportations and removals ==
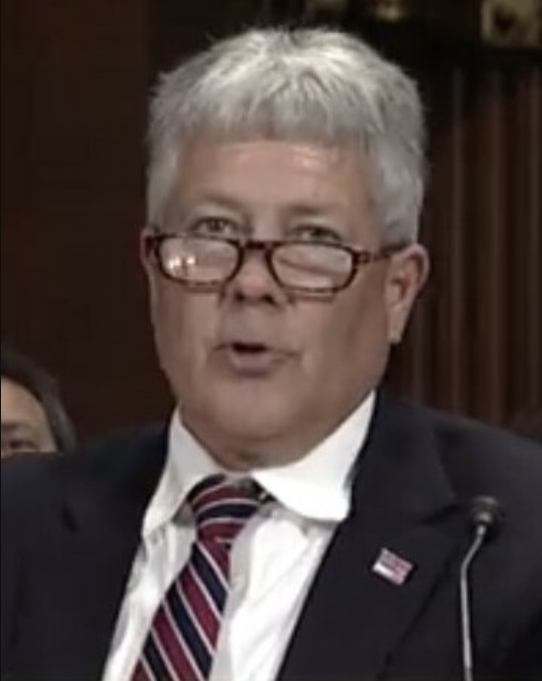
Trump-nominated conservative U.S. District Judge Terry Doughty said deportation of a U.S. citizen is "illegal and unconstitutional" and that he had a "strong suspicion that the Government just deported a U.S. citizen with no meaningful process."

There have been reported deportations of United States citizens although most have turned out not to be actual deportations but deported parents taking their US-born minor age children, and deportation of a citizen is unconstitutional. On Meet the Press, Trump Secretary of State Marco Rubio disputed that the Trump administration deported U.S. citizen children. Rubio stated, "Three U.S. citizens—ages 4, 7 and 2—were not deported. Their mothers, who were illegally in this country, were deported."

Several U.S. citizens, including immigration lawyers, received notices from the federal government instructing them to "self-deport". It is unclear whether this occurred due to an administrative error, nor was there any response from the US Department of Homeland Security (DHS), other than that some of the letters may have been sent to unintended recipients. Lawyers have expressed concerns this is a fear or intimidation tactic.

Even in cases in which migrants choose to use the CBP Home App in an attempt to self-deport, evidence shows that many are never contacted by the U.S. government, which promises them a safe return to country of origin. ProPublica reports that more than a dozen Venezuelans used the app as told, signed up, and were even given departure dates that subsequently came and went without notice. Concerns have been raised that the app may be useless in such instances where the U.S. State Department does not have the ability to acquire documents and obtain safe passage to locations that are politically fraught or dangerous.

=== 2-year-old child ===
A 2-year-old US citizen was deported to Honduras with her mother, Jenny Carolina Lopez-Villela, on April 25, 2025. The child, identified in court records by the initials V.M.L., was born in Baton Rouge, Louisiana, in 2023.

Lopez-Villela and V.M.L.'s sister came to the United States in September 2019 to seek asylum after the attempted kidnapping of Janelle. They awaited court hearing in Mexico under the Migrant Protection Protocols. They attended two hearings before they were forced to return to Honduras in November 2019 to avoid dangerous conditions in Matamoros. While they were in Honduras, an immigration court ordered them removed in absentia in March 2020, and they were never informed of this. They returned to the Mexican side of the US border in March 2021 to seek asylum but, while waiting to get in, they were detained in Nuevo Laredo. They eventually entered the US in August 2021, being released to the custody of Janelle's father in Louisiana and instructed to attend regular ICE check ins, which they did. During this time, V.M.L. was born in 2023. In February 2025, Lopez-Villela was placed in the "Intensive Supervision Appearance Program". On April 22, 2025, they went to the ISAP appointment and were detained.

On April 22, 2025, Lopez-Villela, a citizen of Honduras, was asked to bring her children with her when attending a check in with ICE. During the check in, V.M.L., Janelle, and Lopez-Villela, who was pregnant at the time, were detained and V.M.L.'s passport was taken away. According to court filings, the three were taken to a hotel in Alexandria, three hours away, and were told they were to be deported the next day. Lopez-Villela was then allowed to talk to V.M.L.'s father for less than a minute on an ICE officer's phone with the ICE officer present. V.M.L.'s father was told that V.M.L. would be deported, to which he objected since she was a US-born citizen. He tried to read out a lawyer's phone number, but the ICE officer hung up. According to the court filing, she was not allowed to arrange for V.M.L.'s care. An attorney working for V.M.L.'s family attempted to set up a call for the family and delivered a mandate delegating custody of V.M.L. to another family member living in the United States. ICE refused to set up the call or provide information and their location.

According to court documents, for the next two days V.M.L., Lopez-Villela and Janelle were held by ICE, at times in the hotel in Alexandria and at times, for up to five hours, in a van at the airport. During this time, V.M.L.'s father reached out to ICE and was told that if he attempted to pick up his daughter, he would also be "taken into custody" and deported. His lawyer called immigration officials and informed them that V.M.L. is a US citizen and could not be deported. The lawyer repeatedly attempted to set up a phone call with Lopez-Villela and between V.M.L.'s parents but this was reportedly refused. On April 24, V.M.L's father and their lawyer finally found out where the three were in a phone call with DOJ's Office of Immigration Litigation (OIL), but OIL refused to hand V.M.L. over to anyone other than her father.

During this time, V.M.L.'s father was erroneously told that the three had been sent to Washington, DC, and would call him from there. Following the call with OIL, the family's lawyer filed a habeas corpus petition and a motion for a temporary restraining order. Later, an ICE officer told Lopez-Villela to sign a paper saying she would take her daughter with her. When she refused, the officer reportedly threatened that if she did not, the children would be sent to a foster home. Lopez-Villela then complied and signed the paper, which was then submitted to the court early in the morning as part of a response to the habeas petition. Before the court could respond to the habeas petition, the family was deported to Honduras, according to court filings. On April 29, the DHS issued a statement in which they claimed that Lopez-Villela "chose to bring her younger daughter ... with her to Honduras."

At a court hearing, US District Judge Terry Doughty said deportation of a US citizen is "illegal and unconstitutional" and that he had a "strong suspicion that the Government just deported a U.S. citizen with no meaningful process." Judge Doughty ordered a hearing on the matter for May 16, 2025.

Referring to the deportation of V.M.L. and two other young children who are American citizens, the executive director of ACLU of Louisiana said, "Once again, the government has used deceptive tactics to deny people their rights. [...] They must be returned." In May 2025, the family of V.M.L. voluntarily dismissed its lawsuit against the Trump administration "to give themselves space and time to consider all the options that are available to them." On July 31, 2025, they filed a new lawsuit, along with another family with two American children, aged 4 and 7, seeking declaratory, Administrative Procedure Act and injunctive relief along with money damages for the violation of their rights.

=== Four-year-old cancer patient and 7-year-old sibling ===
Two American citizens, a 7-year-old girl (identified as A.A.Z.M. in court documents) and her 4-year-old brother "Romeo", were sent to Honduras along with their mother, a Honduran national, on April 25, 2025. Romeo has stage 4 cancer.

Reachel Alexas Morales-Valle, now the mother of Romeo and A.A.Z.M., crossed into the United States in 2013 at the age of 13 and requested asylum at the border. Following a February 2025 traffic stop, she was detained by ICE and placed in the ISAP supervision program, which prompted her to hire an immigration attorney. After hiring an attorney, she discovered that she had been issued an in absentia order of removal in 2015. She attended all of her ISAP appointments and met all requirements. While trying to reschedule an appointment, she was told to bring her American children and their passports to an appointment the next day in Saint Rose, Louisiana.

According to an attorney for the family, Morales-Valle was told that the purpose of the check in was to photocopy the children's passports, and the children wore their school uniforms, expecting to return to school once the appointment was over. The three of them were separated from their lawyer and then detained. The children's mother was not permitted to speak with an attorney or family members prior to their deportation, despite trying to do so.

ICE agents then reportedly demanded that Morales-Valle sign a document without explaining what it said and without allowing her to talk to her lawyer about it. She refused. Agents informed them that they would be deported, refused a request to talk to their lawyer and then allowed them a brief call to the father to inform him they were being deported. They were taken out through the back, apparently to avoid their lawyer and then driven three hours to a hotel in Alexandria, Louisiana. Later, their lawyer was informed that they had been transferred but was given no further information. The lawyer was told to take the matter up with an office in New Orleans, which they did - filing a stay of removal and pointing out that they were not properly notified which should result in an automatic stay. The lawyer then asked to talk to a supervisor but was told no one was available. The lawyer spent much of the day trying to identify the location of Morales-Valle and her children and to make arrangements for the children prior to deportation, but was unable to get responses to her requests. That night, Morales-Valle was able to make a brief call on an ICE agent's phone to her father and tell him they were in Alexandria and were to be deported the next day, but then the agent hung up the phone.

In the early morning hours of April 25, 2025, Morales-Valle and her children were driven to the airport and forced onto a plane, while ICE and other immigration staff ignored requests from Morales-Valle's lawyer. As they were on the plane, ICE officials told the lawyer that the stay of removal application had been denied, though the lawyer had received no such formal notification. Morales-Valle and her family were then flown to Honduras, the children's passports were returned and an officer tried again to get her sign the documents she had refused to sign in Louisiana.

Attorneys for both the mother and the children insisted that the children were deported illegally. The attorneys provided evidence demonstrating that their mother, other family members, and attorneys "had little to no chance" to arrange for the children to stay in the U.S. rather than being deported. The attorneys were in the midst of preparing habeas corpus petitions for the children, but the children were deported before the attorneys could file them.

The 4-year-old had his cancer medication with him, but was not permitted to access it in detention, and was not allowed to bring the medication with him when he was deported. ICE was aware of the 4-year-old's cancer diagnosis and that he was undergoing treatment prior to his deportation.

Tom Homan, President Donald Trump's "border czar", called the children anchor babies, commenting that "Having a U.S. citizen child after you enter this country illegally is not a get-out-of-jail free card." In speaking about the deportation of these children and another U.S. citizen child, Homan insisted that the children's mothers requested their children be removed from the country, and said it was preferable to keep the families together. Secretary of State Marco Rubio denied that the children had been deported, instead saying that they "went with their mothers", and that because they are citizens, they could return to the U.S. if the families arranged for someone in the U.S. to care for them. In a statement from DHS, they again asserted that "she chose to bring both children...with her to Honduras."

In August, the National Immigration Project filed a lawsuit on behalf of Morales-Valle, her family and the family of a 2-year-old American deported at the same time (see above). The lawsuit said they were unlawfully denied due process and deported. The lawsuit noted that "Courts have observed that the U.S. Government cannot 'deport' a United States citizen. In fact, some courts have posited that the term "banished" is most appropriate for this scenario to avoid the appearance of legitimacy or normalcy." In the suit, they allege that the mothers said they wanted their children to remain in the U.S., but that the families were "illegally deported without even a semblance of due process." They sued for declaratory relief, Administrative Procedure Act relief, injunctive relief, and monetary damages for the violation of their rights.

=== Ten-year-old child with brain cancer and four siblings ===
A 10-year-old girl with brain cancer, who is an American citizen, was deported with her parents and four siblings to Mexico after being stopped at an immigration checkpoint while on the way to an emergency medical appointment on February 4, 2025. The eldest child, aged 15, also has Long QT Syndrome, a heart condition. Four of the five children were born in the US. In May 2026 their parents' humanitarian parole applications to return to US for treatment have been denied.

=== Génesis Ester Gutiérrez Castellanos ===
5-year-old U.S. citizen Génesis Ester Gutiérrez Castellanos, of Austin, Texas, was deported to Honduras alongside her mother on January 11, 2026. ICE agents were acting on a deportation order issued in 2019, a year before Gutiérrez Castellanos was born in 2020. Her mother has expressed plans to send her back to US soon accompanied by another relative.

=== Brian Morales / Bryan Jose Morales-Garcia ===
According to Univision journalist Lidia Terrazas, Brian Morales—a U.S. citizen who was born in Denver, Colorado, and raised in Mexico—was deported to Mexico on April 7, 2026, after a traffic stop by CBP agents. Terrazas's report, made after contacting Morales, claims that Morales originally entered the U.S. legally with his birth certificate, was threatened by agents with deportation or prison time for fraud, and was ignored when claiming that he had proof of citizenship at home. Morales also told Terrazas that he was pressured into telling officers "what they wanted to hear" and signing voluntary removal papers out of fear of being imprisoned, which he was worried would prevent him from seeing his daughter. Morales also stated that his boss—also a U.S. citizen—was detained by ICE. A spokesperson for the DHS denied the citizenship status of Morales, whose name they claim to be Bryan Jose Morales-Garcia, alleging that he was confirmed to be in the U.S. illegally after record checks by US Border Patrol agents. The spokesperson also alleged that Morales-Garcia admitted to being a Mexican national and entering the U.S. illegally. Morales-Garcia was allowed to return to US while litigation proceeds on August 30, 2026 in light of additional documents submitted by his legal team.

== Detentions ==
Immigration detentions of U.S. citizens in the second Trump administration were caused by U.S. immigration enforcement actions by agencies including Immigration and Customs Enforcement (ICE) and U.S. Customs and Border Protection (CBP) and involved documented cases in which American citizens were stopped, detained, arrested, or held in custody in connection with immigration operations. Reporting based on official records and court filings has described incidents in which enforcement personnel detained people without first confirming citizenship status, and in which citizens were allegedly subjected to enforcement actions later challenged as unlawful or unsupported by accurate official narratives.

Because the federal government did not maintain a comprehensive public count of citizen detentions, totals have largely been reconstructed through investigative reporting and litigation; ProPublica reported at least 506 citizen detentions through September 2026 and described cases involving alleged force and multi-day detention without access to counsel or communication. Commentators and advocacy groups have argued that the pattern of detentions reflects racial profiling and has contributed to some citizens carrying passports or other proof of citizenship within the United States despite there being no general legal requirement to do so. Other reported cases have involved citizens detained during street encounters, workplace actions, and protests, including military veterans arrested during demonstrations against ICE activity.

== Targeted demographics ==
=== Hispanic and Latino ===
ICE and the Federal government have been accused of specifically targeting Hispanic and Latino members of society, regardless of their citizenship or immigration status. Numerous Latino and Hispanic citizens of the United States have been detained for up to ten days as of July 9, 2025. In September 2025, the Supreme Court ruled that immigration agents have the power to detain individuals based on race, spoken language, or accent.

90% of targeted individuals in June and July of 2025 (approx. 9,000) were confirmed to be of Latin American heritage directly from analysis of data obtained from ICE officials.

=== Puerto Rican ===
Puerto Ricans are U.S. citizens as established by the Jones-Shafroth Act (1917), which made Puerto Rico a U.S. territory. Despite their citizenship, Puerto Ricans were detained and arrested in ICE raids under the second Trump administration in multiple incidents. In one, a U.S. military veteran from Puerto Rico was detained on January 23, 2025, after an ICE raid at a seafood warehouse in Newark, New Jersey. The veteran worked there as a warehouse manager. The co-owner of the business said that ICE appeared to be targeting people who look Hispanic, while ignoring his white employees.

In another incident, three members of a Puerto Rican family were taken to a detention center in Milwaukee, Wisconsin, on January 27, 2025, after an immigration officer heard one of them speaking Spanish. They were released prior to processing when they provided documentation. The detentions led to a significant upswing in passport requests from Puerto Ricans to provide documentation to satisfy immigration officers.

=== Navajo Nation ===
All Navajo people born within the United States are U.S. citizens due to the Indian Citizenship Act of 1924 and the United States Constitution. According to the Navajo Nation, over a dozen indigenous people had been questioned, detained, or asked to provide proof of citizenship by federal law enforcement during immigration raids in January 2025. In some cases, ICE officers were not aware that Certificates of Degree of Indian Blood (CDIB) are proof of citizenship, and one person was detained for nine hours. In another case, eight Native Americans were detained for two hours after their workplace was raided. Their phones were confiscated, and one Navajo woman reported that she was not able to provide proof of citizenship until her phone was returned and she was able to text family, one of whom sent a copy of the woman's CDIB.

Enough Navajos have been stopped by immigration authorities that the nation created a guide with tips about what to do if stopped, encouraging people to always carry identification and that families alert their children about what to do, including having them memorize their Social Security numbers. Other tribes have also issued tips and warnings, and Native News Online published an article, "Native Americans and Immigration Enforcement–Know Your Rights." Navajo Arizona state senator Theresa Hatathlie suggested that tribes contact DHS to share what their travel enrollment card and CDIB look like.

== See also ==
- Alligator Alcatraz
- Citizenship of the United States
- Death of Nurul Amin Shah Alam
- Deportation of Americans from the United States
- Due process
- Gun death and violence in the United States by state
- Impersonations of United States immigration officials
- Internment of German Americans
- Internment of Italian Americans
- Internment of Japanese Americans
- June 2025 Los Angeles protests
- Kavanaugh stop
- Killing of Silverio Villegas González
- List of concentration and internment camps of the United States
- List of deaths in ICE detention
- List of denaturalized former citizens of the United States
- List of ICE field offices
- List of immigrant detention sites in the United States
- List of shootings by U.S. immigration agents in the second Trump administration
- Operation Midway Blitz
- Operation Wetback
- Protests against mass deportation during the second Trump administration
- Shooting of Marimar Martinez
- Surveillance state
- Timeline of protests against Donald Trump
- United States person
- Visa and deportation controversies in the second Trump administration
- Your papers, please
