= Pafuera Telarañas =

Studio album by Bebe
- Released: May 10, 2004
- Recorded: 2003–04
- Genre: flamenco; Latin pop; electronic
- Length: 46:21
- Label: EMI Spain

Bebe chronology
Pafuera Telarañas (2004)	Y. (2009)

Pafuera Telarañas (English: Out with the Spiderwebs) is the debut album by Spanish artist Bebe. It was released in 2004 and contains six released singles along with other tracks.

== Composition ==
The album was noted for its combination of musical styles, including flamenco, electronica, and pop. "Ella" ("She") has been described as a "female power anthem", and has also been interpreted as a protest against gender violence. She told El Asombrario & Co. that she wrote the song after the death of "a very important person in my life".

"Malo" ("Bad") follows a woman who begs her husband to stop abusing her, for the sake of herself and their child; at the end of the song, she leaves him. She wrote the song four years before its release, after seeing many news stories about domestic violence, sometimes as many as three in a single day; although she had never experienced domestic violence herself, she felt empathy for those who did, and so wrote "Malo". In 2005, she told Billboard that she didn't consider the song to tell a story so much as "a thought". She also commented that when she wrote the song, she didn't consider whether or not the narrator leaves her abuser. Its chorus translates to English as "You're bad, bad, bad".

== Release ==
The album was released in Bebe's native Spain in May 2004, in the United States in Fall 2004, and in Latin America in February 2005. In its May 21, 2005, issue, Billboard reported that the album had sold over 235,000 copies in Spain, as well as 30,000 copies in the United States and 15,000 copies in Latin America. The album received a release in France on May 17, with advance promotions in the form of a series of radio showcase performances. By September 2005, the album had spent over 68 weeks on Spain's album sales chart and sold over 300,000 copies there.

"Malo" was released as the album's first single and became Spain's song of the summer in 2004, spending two weeks at number one on the country's radio chart. After the Spanish government introduced legislation to combat domestic violence, the song became an anthem.

== Accolades ==
At the ninth annual Music Awards in Spain (Spanish: Premios de la Música), held on April 21, 2005, Bebe received nine nominations and won four awards. At the 6th Annual Latin Grammy Awards, Bebe received five nominations, the most of any artist that year: Pafuera Telarañas was nominated for Album of the Year and Best Female Pop Vocal Album, while "Malo" was nominated for Record of the Year and Song of the Year, and Bebe herself was nominated for Best New Artist. Bebe was considered one of the ceremony's "top winners", winning Best New Artist.

== Track listing ==
#	Track	Charts
01.	Men Señará	
02.	Ella	Mex #64, US Latin #46
03.	Con Mis Manos	Mex #90
04.	Siempre Me Quedará	Mex #48, US Latin #40
05.	Malo	Mex #1, US Latin #7, Can #90
06.	Ska De La Tierra	
07.	El Golpe	
08.	Revolvió	
09.	Como Los Olivos	
10.	Cuidándote	Mex #33
11.	Siete Horas	
12.	Tú Silencio	
13.	Razones	
SPECIAL EDITION
14.	Corre	
15.	Que Nadie Me Levante La Voz	

== Charts ==
=== Weekly charts ===
Weekly chart performance for Pafuera Telarañas
Chart (2004–2007)	Peak position
Greek Albums (IFPI)	22
Spanish Albums (Promusicae)	3
US Top Latin Albums (Billboard)	23
US Latin Pop Albums (Billboard)	8

=== Year-end charts ===
Year-end chart performance for Pafuera Telarañas
Chart (2004)	Position
Spanish Albums (Promusicae)	14
Chart (2005)	Position
Spanish Albums (Promusicae)	20

== Sales and certifications ==
Region	Certification	Certified units/sales
Argentina (CAPIF)	Gold	20,000^{^}
Greece (IFPI Greece)	Gold	10,000^{^}
Italy (FIMI)	Gold	50,000^{*}
Spain (PROMUSICAE)	3× Platinum	300,000^{^}
United States (RIAA)	Platinum (Latin)	100,000^{^}
^{*} Sales figures based on certification alone.^{^} Shipments figures based on certification alone.
