= Bebe (singer) =

Spanish singer

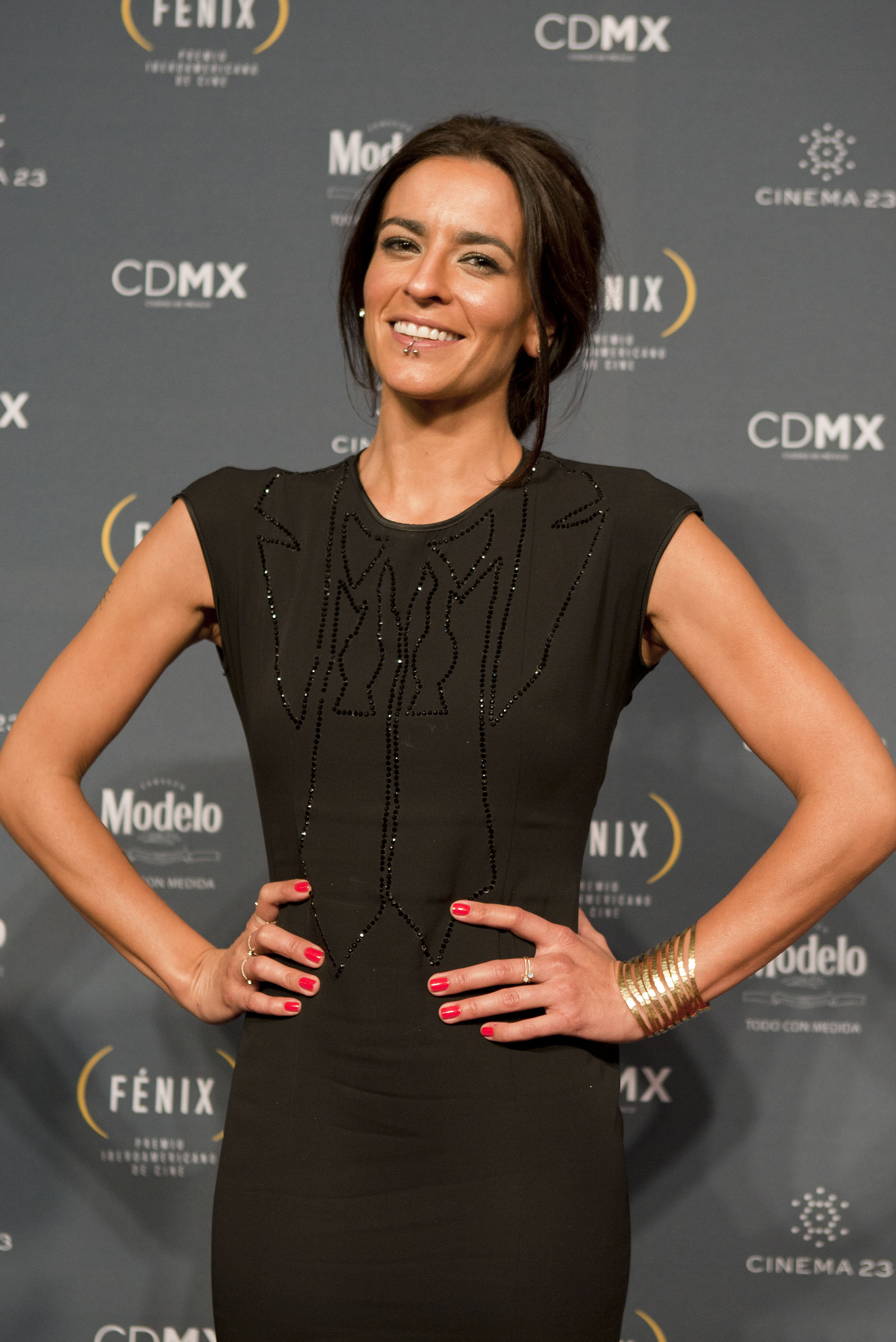

Background information
- Born: María Nieves Rebolledo Vila; 9 May 1978 (age 48); Valencia, Spain
- Origin: Extremadura, Spain
- Genres: Latin pop
- Occupations: Singer; actress
- Instrument: Vocals
- Years active: 2004–present
- Label: EMI Spain
- Website: www.bebeoficial.com

María Nieves Rebolledo Vila (born 9 May 1978), known professionally as Bebe, is a Spanish singer and actress who rose to international fame with the singles "Malo" and "Ella".

== Biography ==
María Nieves Rebolledo Vila was born in Valencia, Spain, although very soon she moved to Extremadura, where she spent her entire childhood. Her parents were members of the Extremaduran folk group Surberina. Her breakthrough album in Spain was entitled Pafuera Telarañas though she gained international recognition after winning the Best New Artist award at the 2005 Latin Grammy Awards. She was nominated for five awards total. The first single from Pafuera Telarañas, "Malo" charted worldwide, and has since been used as the theme for the Argentine series Mujeres Asesinas.

=== 2006 Break ===
On 25 June 2006, Bebe announced that for now her album Pafuera Telarañas would be her debut and her farewell because she was retiring from the stage for a while. She said that even if there is pressure to build up a discography, "I am not thinking of making another CD for quite some time. For a little more than two years I've promoted the same CD and I'm still not done." Nonetheless, she planned to continue touring the US and Mexico. "One has to recycle oneself or one becomes asphyxiated, one has to give oneself space or lose one's mind," she stated.

=== 2009 Y. ===
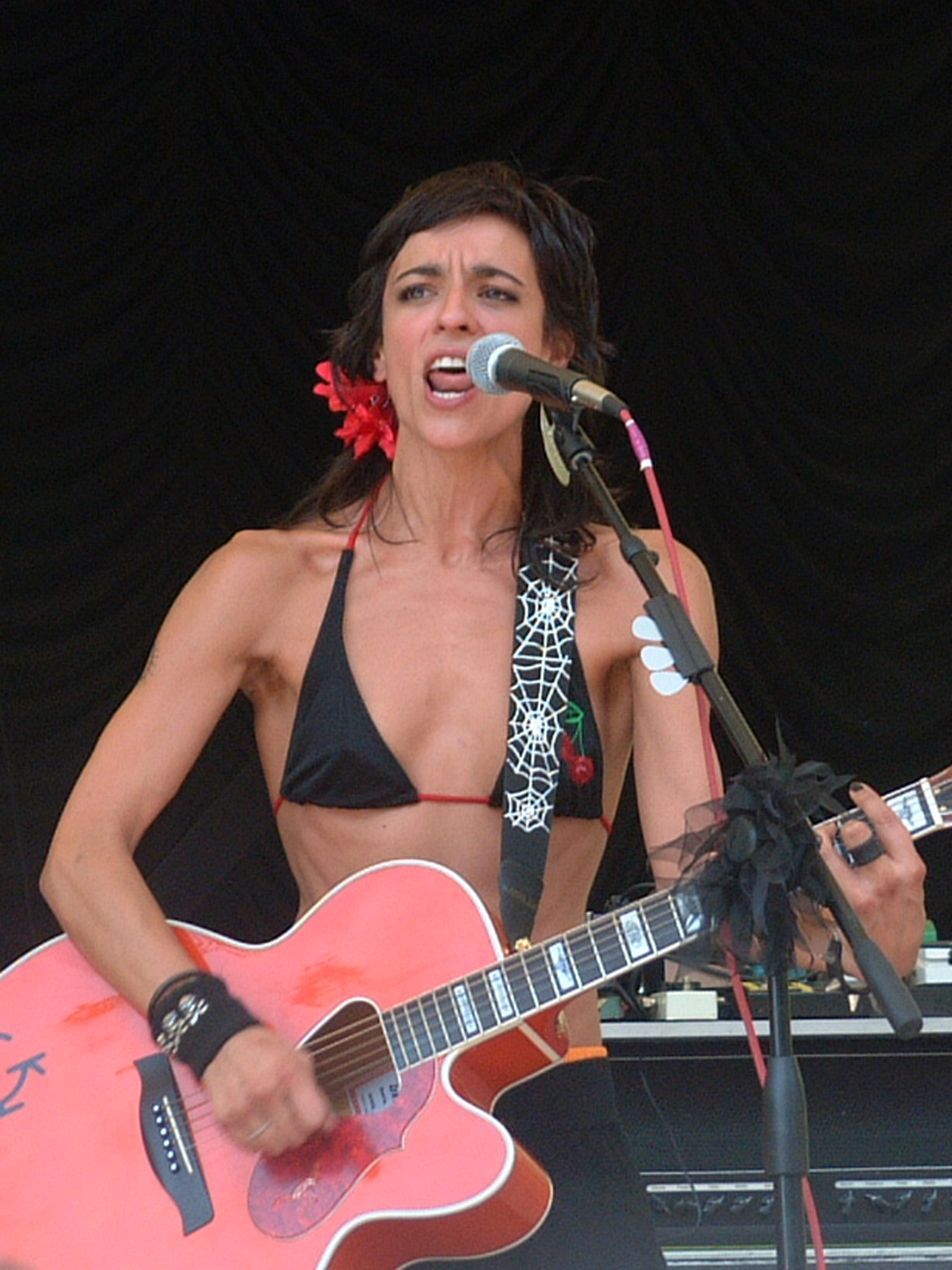
Bebe

She released a new album, Y., in 2009. Her song Se Fue was chosen as the Starbucks iTunes Pick of the Week for 3 November 2009.

== Discography ==
- Pafuera Telarañas (2004)
- Y. (2009)
- Un Pokito de Rocanrol (2012)
- Cambio de Piel (2015)

== Acting career ==
- 2002: Entre cien fuegos (TV)
- 2003: Al sur de Granada
- 2003: El oro de Moscú
- 2006: Busco
- 2006: La educación de las hadas
- 2006: Caótica Ana
- 2021: Libertad (TV)

== Awards and nominations ==
=== Grammy Awards ===
The Grammy Award is an accolade by the National Academy of Recording Arts and Sciences of the United States to recognize outstanding achievement on the music industry. Bebe received one nomination.

Year	Nominee / work	Award	Result
2010	Y.	Best Latin Rock, Urban or Alternative Album	Nominated

=== Latin Grammy Awards ===
A Latin Grammy Award is an accolade by the Latin Academy of Recording Arts & Sciences to recognize outstanding achievement in the music industry. Bebe has received thirteen award nominations.

Year	Nominee / work	Award	Result
2005	Bebe	Best New Artist	Won
2005	Pafuera Telarañas	Album of the Year	Nominated
2005	"Malo"	Record of the Year	Nominated
2005	"Malo"	Song of the Year	Nominated
2005	Pafuera Telarañas	Best Female Pop Vocal Album	Nominated
2009	"Me Fuí"	Song of the Year	Nominated
2009	"Me Fuí"	Best Short Form Music Video	Nominated
2010	Y.	Album of the Year	Nominated
2010	Y.	Best Female Pop Vocal Album	Nominated
2012	Un Pokito de Rokanrol	Album of the Year	Nominated
2012	"Mi Guapo"	Best Alternative Song	Nominated
2016	"Cambio de Piel"	Best Alternative Music Album	Nominated
2016	"10 Años Con Bebe"	Best Long Form Music Video	Nominated
