= Un Pokito de Rocanrol =

Studio album by Bebe
- Released: February 7, 2012
- Recorded: July – September 2011
- Genre: Latin/Pop
- Label: Sony Music
- Producer: Renaud Letang

Bebe chronology
Y. (2009)	Un Pokito de Rocanrol (2012)	Cambio de piel (2015)

Un Pokito de Rocanrol is the third studio album released by Spanish singer-songwriter Bebe, released on February 7, 2012.

== Reception ==
Un Pokito de Rocanrol received a nomination for the Latin Grammy Awards of 2012: Album of the Year. Moreover, her fourth single Mi Guapo was nominated for a Best Alternative Song.

== Track listing ==
1. ABC - 05:42
2. Adiós - 03:45
3. Me pintaré - 04:37
4. Sabrás - 04:41
5. Compra/Paga - 03:28
6. Mi guapo - 05:01
7. K.I.E.R.E.M.E. - 02:58
8. Der pelo - 02:51
9. Qué carajo - 03:20
10. Tilín - 03:10
11. Yo fumo - 03:24

== Personnel ==
- Production Manager - Ariel Perez
- Primary Artist - Bebe
- Composer - Carlos Sanchez De La Sierra
- Marketing - David Alvarado
- Composer - Javier Montes
- Bass, Acoustic Guitar, Electric Guitar - Ludovic Bruni
- Mastering - Mandy Parnell
- Composer - Maria De Las Nieves Rebolledo
- Photography - Rara Fallar
- Electric Guitar, Keyboards, Mixing, Percussion, Synthesizer - Renaud Letang
- Engineer - Thomas Moulin
- A&R- Vanessa Asturias
- Drums, Electronic Drums, Harp, Percussion, Xylophone - Vincent Taeger

== Singles ==
#	Title
1.	«K.I.E.R.E.M.E»
2.	«Adiós»
3.	«Me pintaré»
4.	«Mi guapo»
