= Imperfecta-Imperfect =

Studio album by JD Natasha
- Released: July 13, 2004
- Recorded: 2004, The Warehouse Studios, Miami, Florida Crescent Moon Studios, Miami, Florida
- Genres: Pop, Rock, Alternative rock, Latin
- Length: 47:34
- Labels: EMI; EMI Televisa Music
- Producers: Sebastián Krys, Gustavo Menéndez

Alternative cover

Professional ratings
Review scores
| Source | Rating |
|---|---|
| Allmusic | 3.5/5 stars |
| MSN Music | 3.5/5 stars |
| Starpulse | 3/5 stars |

Imperfecta-Imperfect is JD Natasha's only solo album. She wrote most of the songs of the album, and has stated "I sing to everybody, but I feel that youth people understand my language". The album was released in some regions with "Lágrimas" as a multimedia track. It was classified by the RIAA as an Explicit Album and has Parental Advisory label. In 2005, Imperfecta-Imperfect was nominated at the 6th Annual Latin Grammy Awards in the category of "Rock Solo Vocal Album" and the single "Lágrimas" nominated for "Rock Song". The music video for "Imperfect" went into rotation on MTV in August 2004.

She has stated,

I write my music of how I feel, because I had the necessity to express how I feel, and I don't make music if my feelings and my senses don't want.

— JD Natasha, commenting about how she write the songs.

== Track listing ==
JD Natasha credits herself as Natasha Jeanett Dueñas.

1. "Plástico" _{(Natasha Jeanett Dueñas)} — 2:40
2. "Lágrimas" _{(Natasha Jeanett Dueñas/Martin Chan)} — 3:04
3. "Tanto" _{(Natasha Jeanett Dueñas/Elsten Creole Torres)} — 3:30
4. "Tatuaje" _{(Natasha Jeanett Dueñas/Elsten Creole Torres)} — 2:57
5. "Tan Cerca" _{(Natasha Jeanett Dueñas)} — 3:59
6. "Ingredientes" _{(Natasha Jeanett Dueñas/Sebastián Krys)} — 3:43
7. "10 Mil" _{(Natasha Jeanett Dueñas)} — 3:51
8. "Imperfect" _{(Natasha Jeanett Dueñas)} — 4:39
9. "Dime" _{(Natasha Jeanett Dueñas/Sebastián Krys)} — 3:18
10. "Not Healthy" _{(Natasha Jeanett Dueñas/Sebastián Krys)} — 3:32
11. "Piscis" _{(Natasha Jeanett Dueñas/Martin Chan)} — 3:09
12. "Lágrimas" (Full Acoustic Version)— 2:59
13. "Tanto" (live from Sessions @ AOL)^{1} — 3:36
14. "Hey Ya!" (live from Sessions @ AOL) (OutKast cover) ^{1} _{(André 3000)} — 2:36

15. "Lágrimas" (Multimedia Track) in some regions

^{1}Bonus Tracks

== CD-DVD Edition Track listing ==
Imperfecta-Imperfect CD & DVD Edition Released on July 19, 2005

CD:

1. "Plástico" _{(Natasha Jeanett Dueñas)} — 2:40
2. "Lágrimas" _{(Natasha Jeanett Dueñas/Martin Chan)} — 3:04
3. "Tanto" _{(Natasha Jeanett Dueñas/Elsten Creole Torres)} — 3:30
4. "Tatuaje" _{(Natasha Jeanett Dueñas/Elsten Creole Torres)} — 2:57
5. "Tan Cerca" _{(Natasha Jeanett Dueñas)} — 3:59
6. "Ingredientes" _{(Natasha Jeanett Dueñas/Sebastián Krys)} — 3:43
7. "10 Mil" _{(Natasha Jeanett Dueñas)} — 3:51
8. "Imperfect" _{(Natasha Jeanett Dueñas)} — 4:39
9. "Dime" _{(Natasha Jeanett Dueñas/Sebastián Krys)} — 3:18
10. "Not Healthy" _{(Natasha Jeanett Dueñas/Sebastián Krys)} — 3:32
11. "Piscis" _{(Natasha Jeanett Dueñas/Martin Chan)} — 3:09
12. "Lágrimas" (Full Acoustic Version)— 2:59

DVD:

1. Lágrimas [video]
2. Tanto [video]
3. Plástico [video]
4. Imperfect [video]
5. Bonus Material

== Singles ==
- Lágrimas (2004)_{(Peaked 14 on Billboard Hot Latin Tracks Chart)}
- Tanto
- Plástico
- Imperfect
- Tatuaje

== Personnel ==
- JD Natasha (vocals, guitar)
- Dan Warner, Andrew Synowiec, Adam Zimmon (guitars)
- Chris Glansdorf (cello)
- Ron Taylor (melodica, keyboards)
- John Falcone (bass guitar)
- Lee Levin, Fernando Sanchez (drums)
- Sebastián Krys, Gustavo Menéndez, John Falcone (arrangers)
- Mike Couzzi, Sebastián Krys, Ron Taylor (recording)
- Steve Menezes, Kevin Dillon, Ruben Parra (studio managers)
- Gustavo Menéndez, Sebastián Krys (producers)
- Jorge Alberto Pino (executive producer)
- Sebastián Krys (engineer)
- Adam Ayan (mastering engineer)
- Daniel Ponce (mixing assistant)
- Colin Michaels, Miguel Bustamante, Daniel Ponce, Jesse Fishman (recording assistants)
- Rebeca León (project coordinator)
- Leyla Leeming (production coordination)
- Javier Valverde (production assistant)
- Kurt Berge (technical support)
- Lisette Lorenzo (art direction)
- Omar Cruz (photography)
- Yaro (photography)
- Kristopher Lett (photo assistant)
