= Lágrimas (JD Natasha song) =

Single by JD Natasha

from the album Imperfecta-Imperfect
- Released: June 1, 2004
- Genre: Rock/Pop/Alternative Music
- Length: 3:04
- Label: EMI, EMI Music Televisa
- Songwriter(s): JD Natasha, Martin Chan
- Producer(s): Sebastián Krys, Gustavo Menéndez

JD Natasha singles chronology
"Lágrimas" (2004)	"Tanto" (2004)

"Lágrimas" was the first single of JD Natasha's first album Imperfecta-Imperfect. The single was an international hit, ranking at number 14 on the Billboard Hot Latin Tracks chart for 3 weeks in 2004. The song was co-written by Martin Chan (Volumen Cero) and Natasha and brought her first notoriety.

On 2005, "Lágrimas" was nominated in the 6th Annual Latin Grammy Awards in the category of "Rock Song".

== Track listing ==
1. Lágrimas (Full Acoustic Version) (2:59)
2. Lágrimas (Album Version) (3:04)

== Video ==
The video was directed by Pablo Croce and taped in an old mansion in Argentina; in the video, Natasha is fighting with her inner voices and playing her song with an amazing feeling. The video was a hit in Pepsi Musica and MTV International. The video peaked number one on MTV Español.
