= Y. (Bebe album) =

Studio album by Bebe
- Released: June 29, 2009
- Genre: Latin, Rock en Español, flamenco, folk
- Label: EMI
- Producer: Carlos Jean

Bebe chronology
Pafuera Telarañas (2004)	Y. (2009)	Un Pokito de Rocanrol (2012)

Singles from Y.
- 1. "Me Fui" Released: May 11, 2009; 2. "Pa Mi Casa" Released: October 7, 2009

Y. is the second studio album released by Spanish singer-songwriter Bebe. Released on June 29, 2009, the album received positive critical reviews, and entered the Spanish Album Chart at number one. It was released after Bebe's four-year hiatus from the music business, following the success of her debut album Pafuera Telarañas. Recorded over a year in Madrid and Cadiz, Spain, Y. includes the Latin Grammy Award-nominated song "Me Fui" and the single "Pa' Mi Casa". The album was produced by Carlos Jean, who also worked with Bebe on her debut album. Bebe wrote all the lyrics, including some dealing with issues such as love, sex and self-respect. Y. received a Grammy Award nomination for Best Latin Rock, Alternative or Urban Album and was re-released in December 2009 as a double album edition, which includes the original songs and a separate album with B-sides and collaborations with Lucio Godoy, Luis Pastor, Pedro Guerra and Kultama.

== History ==
After the success of her debut album Pafuera Telarañas, Bebe decided to withdraw from her music career to concentrate on other projects. In 2009, she posted a new song, "La Bicha", on her personal blog, describing it as a gift for fans and a preview for her upcoming album. The album, as described by the singer, is a collection of 13 songs about feelings and thoughts that are spinning. The album title, which translates roughly as "And that's that", is an expression that the singer used a lot with her colleagues.

=== Recording ===
The recording of the album took almost a year. In May 2008, Bebe traveled to Cadiz, Spain, to collect all the notebooks she had written in the previous five years and to select material for the album. The entries in her notebook reflected on her thoughts about sadness and sexual exploration. In the fall of the same year, she met in Madrid with members of her band, virtually the same team she had left before taking a break. José Luis Crespo, the sound engineer, gave the final shape to this album. In her personal blog, Bebe comments that the process of creating this new album was long and meticulous and that every song on the album represents a different mood.

== Musical and lyrical style ==
It's an album to enjoy, to approach a different artist, who defends her world and her uncompromising personal space, but sometimes does not hesitate to show openly, truthfully and sensual, but always holding back something, without revealing everything. Y. is an album of courage, daring, conceived outside the laws of modern music, with a peculiar use of popular language and designed to offer something new, capable of generating surprise.

— Bebe

The album opens with the lyrics "I have been sleeping six feet under and I have decided to sleep on the ground. I spend so much time regretting what I did not understand that now I want to see the light of day", performed a cappella on the track "No + Llorá". This song, according to the singer, is a statement, an account of the journey that the album is. This song also reflects the year she wandered through Spain in a van: "It's a 'nomadic' song, my parents instilled in me that way of life and travel." The first single "Me Fui", blends the voice of Bebe with Spanish guitars, evolving into a subtle groove of reggae with lyrics open to many interpretations, as in the fragment "I went away to miss you, I went away to be back again, I went away to be alone, I left." "Escuece" is a song of indifference, that is separated from the previous semi-acoustic environment to adopt an air of an agile big band, with the trombone by Ove Larsson, the metal section by Arturo Soriano and the guitars of Carlos Jean, Diego Pozo and Pablo Novoa. "Cuando + Me Sujetas", is barely sustained by electric guitars and programming, which might evoke some of the best moments of the Cuban trova. "Qué Mimporta" is an angry theme, sung in rap rhythm, with a more vibrant pace, almost funk on drums, to acquire more rock music after a voltage which alternates with a more relaxed environments that maintain a swing. "Nostaré" begins with sounds of water drops and returns to deal with melancholy disappointment in love with a fine instrumental support led by Jean, looking for the simplest, most elemental, taking off any superfluous beat. The second single, "Pa Mi Casa", is a subject of loud sounds and melancholy. The song is a blend of instruments and clapping. This jazz fusionated single is a look back at the experiences of the artist: "Whatever happens to you, whether for good or bad, it teaches you and helps you grow." According to Bebe, the track "La Bicha" is about a girl that is tired of giving up, a girl who gradually removes her 'cobwebs'. In the guitar driven "Sinsentido", the singer recognizes the abuse that has given to her body over the years. Y., as told by the lyricist, is a combination of aggressive themes, insolent, with more gentle and delicate, form a scene of a lot of improvisation, which led the feelings flow. She worked with producer Carlos Jean to incorporate natural sounds associated with earth, wind, sea and night. Jean said about the album: "It is wonderful, terrific, brutal and, above all, different."

== Reception ==
Y. received a positive review by Allmusic, which rated the album with 3.5 out of five stars, and describing the album as a relatively downcast in attitude and stripped-down in style, emphasizing acoustic rather than electric instrumentation. Also, the review said that the tracks "No + Llorá" and "Busco Me" were some of the "highlights" of the album. It also praised the rough-hewn vocals of Bebe and the hypnotic flamenco guitar of Diego Pozo of Los Delinqüentes, particularly on the song "Me Fui", which he named it "impressive", ultimately saying that Y. is a great album, a boldly creative effort by Bebe that showcases not only her talent as an alternative singer-songwriter but also her originality and defiance of Latin pop mainstream expectations. The first single was also well reviewed by the Spanish radio station Los 40, naming it "genial work."

"Me Fui" received two nominations for the Latin Grammy Awards of 2009: Song of the Year (shared with Carlos Jean) and Best Music Video Short Form. At the 52nd Annual Grammy Awards, Y. was nominated for Best Latin Rock, Alternative or Urban Album, but lost to Calle 13's Los de Atrás Vienen Conmigo.

== Track listing ==
The standard edition of the album was released with 13 songs, listed below. On December 9, 2009, a deluxe edition of Y. was released including the same tracks as the standard presentation, two new songs: "Recomposición" and "Sin Palabras", seven b-sides: "María" (a collaboration with Miguel Campello for the soundtrack of the film El Sur), "Pedigri" (with Kultama), "Silla Eléctrica", "Tiempo" (with Carlos Jean), "Tiempo Pequeño" (with Lucio Godoy), "Aguas Abril" (with Luis Pastor) and "El Marido de la Peluera" (with Pedro Guerra). Also a DVD is included with the music videos for "Me Fui", "Pa Mi Casa" and "La Bicha", and footage of the singer tours in Mexico, Miami, New York City and Paris in 2005 and 2006.

No.	Title	Writer(s)	Length
1.	"No + Llorá"	Bebe	4:08
2.	"Me Fui"	Bebe, Carlos Jean	4:49
3.	"Busco-Me"	Bebe	4:59
4.	"Sinsentido"	Bebe, Marcos Bayón	4:59
5.	"Escuece"	Bebe, Carlos Jean	3:40
6.	"Cuando + Me Sujetas"	Bebe	2:43
7.	"Que Mimporta"	Bebe	4:12
8.	"La Bicha"	Bebe	4:56
9.	"Se Fué"	Bebe	3:08
10.	"Pa Una Isla"	Bebe, Javier Rojas, Carlos Sánchez	4:53
11.	"Nostaré"	Bebe	4:50
12.	"Pa Mi Casa"	Bebe	5:13
13.	"Uh, Uh, Uh, Uh, Uh"	Bebe, Ignacio Cubillas, Javier Rojas	5:36

== Chart performance ==
Y. debuted at the top of the Spanish Album Chart on July 5, 2009, replacing Lines, Vines and Trying Times by The Jonas Brothers. It was succeeded the following week by the late American singer Michael Jackson. The album rose to number-one again five weeks later, spending eleven weeks within the top ten. Y. was awarded with a Platinum certification in Spain, for shipments over 60,000 units. The album peaked at number 73 in Mexico and at number 28 in United States.

Chart (2009)	Peak position
European Top 100 Albums	43
Mexican Albums Chart	73
Spanish Albums Chart	1
U.S. Billboard Top Latin Albums	28
U.S. Billboard Latin Pop Albums	5

Region	Certification	Certified units/sales
Spain (PROMUSICAE)	Platinum	80,000^{^}
^{^} Shipments figures based on certification alone.

== Personnel ==
- Carlos Jean – acoustic guitar, electric guitar, guitar, electronic organ, hammond organ, programming, ukulele, record producer, Spanish guitar, bass, fender rhodes
- Bebe – lead vocals
- Ian Cooper – mastering
- José Luis Crespo – recording, mixing, artistic director
- Diego "Raton" Pozo – acoustic guitar, guitar, Spanish guitar
- Carlitos Del Río – production assistant
- Guillermo Domercq – percussion
- Rafael Garcia – cajon
- Victor Iniesta – guitar
- Ove Larsson – trombone
- Junior Martin – drums
- Pablo Novoa – electric guitar
- Raúl Quílez – music director, recording
- Santiago Quizhpe – production assistant
- Javier Rojas – acoustic guitar, bass
- Carlos DeLos Santos Sánchez – drums
- Arturo Soriano – metals
- Juan José Calzas – Spanish guitar
- Miguel Campillo – vocals

== Release history ==
Region	Date	Format	Label
Spain	June 30, 2009	CD, digital download (standard edition)	EMI Music Spain
Mexico	July 1, 2009	CD, digital download (standard edition)	EMI Music
United States	July 14, 2009	CD, digital download (standard edition)	EMI Music Distribution
Spain	December 9, 2009	2CD, DVD, digital download (deluxe edition)	EMI Music Spain
