= Cambio de Piel (Bebe album) =

Studio album by Bebe
- Released: 9 October 2015
- Recorded: 2014/2015
- Genre: Latin/Pop
- Label: Warner Music Spain
- Producer: Carlos Jean

Bebe chronology
Un Pokito de Rocanrol (2012)	Cambio de Piel (2015)

Singles from Cambio de Piel
- 1. "Respirar" Released: 17 July 2015

Cambio de Piel is the fourth studio album released on 9 October 2015 by Spanish singer-songwriter Bebe.

== Track listing ==
1. "Respirar" (Bebe)
2. "Borrones" (Bebe)
3. "La cuenta" (Bebe)
4. "Que llueva" (Bebe)
5. "Bala perdida" (Bebe)
6. "Tan lejos tan cerca" (Bebe)
7. "Animales hambrientos" (Bebe)
8. "Chica precavida" (Bebe)
9. "Ganamos" (Bebe)
10. "Una canción" (Bebe)
11. "Más que a mi vida" (Bebe)
12. "Todo lo que deseaba" (Bebe)

== Charts ==
=== Weekly charts ===
Weekly chart performance for Cambio de Piel
Chart (2015)	Peak position
Spanish Albums (PROMUSICAE)	4
US Latin Pop Albums (Billboard)	19

=== Year-end charts ===
Year-end chart performance for Cambio de Piel
Chart (2015)	Position
Spanish Albums (PROMUSICAE)	97
