= Duele el Amor =

Single by Aleks Syntek featuring Ana Torroja

from the album Mundo Lite
- Released: December 22, 2003
- Recorded: February – July 2003
- Studio: In Da Haus Studios (Los Angeles, California); Brava! Music; Cosmos Studios; El Cuatro de Máquinas; La Bodega; Level Estudios; Natenzon Estudio (Mexico City, Mexico)
- Genre: Latin pop
- Length: 4:35
- Label: EMI Music Latin
- Songwriter: Aleks Syntek
- Producer: Áureo Baqueiro · Armando Ávila

Aleks Syntek singles chronology
"Bendito Tu Corazón" (2002)	"Duele el Amor" (2003)	"Te Soñé" (2004)

"Duele el Amor" (Love hurts) is a song by Mexican singer-songwriter Aleks Syntek featuring Spanish singer-songwriter Ana Torroja released on December 15, 2003, as the first single of his album Mundo Lite (2004). "Duele el Amor" is the most commercially successful song by Aleks Syntek and Ana Torroja. An English version titled "Love Breaks Your Heart" with Joy Huerta from Jesse & Joy appears in special editions of Mundo Lite, however this didn't achieve recognition in the U.S.

== Chart performance ==
Chart (2004)	Peak position
Colombia (National Report)	1
Mexico (Monitor Latino)	1
US Bubbling Under Hot 100 (Billboard)	19
US Hot Latin Songs (Billboard)	2
US Latin Pop Airplay (Billboard)	1
US Tropical Airplay (Billboard)	4
