= Pedro Guzman =

American illegally deported to Mexico

Pedro Guzman (also known as Peter Guzman) is a U.S. citizen who was illegally deported to Mexico by the U.S. Immigration and Customs Enforcement agency (ICE) in May 2007. He spent 85 days in Mexico before successfully returning to his American family in the United States. Guzman's lawyers filed a lawsuit on February 27, 2008, against the Los Angeles County Sheriff's Department and the ICE, and was settled on May 11, 2010, with Guzman receiving $350,000.

== History ==
According to court documents, Guzman was born in Los Angeles, California, to Maria Carbajal, a citizen of Mexico and a lawful permanent resident of the United States. The two have made a couple of short trips to Mexico but resided most of their life in the Los Angeles area. Guzman was unemployed due to an illness. His mother worked at a Jack in the Box restaurant.

Sometime prior to 2008, Guzman was arrested for trespassing in a Lancaster airport, where he attempted to board a private airplane, and was subsequently sentenced to 120 days in a Los Angeles County jail (later reduced to 40 days). During custody, a sheriff's department employee erroneously reported him to the ICE as a non-citizen, despite both departmental records and a statement Guzman made at booking identifying him as a US citizen.

Once transferred to ICE custody, Guzman signed a document agreeing to a voluntary deportation to Mexico. ICE officials claimed that Guzman "repeatedly told ICE officers and Customs and Border Patrol officials and others that he was born in Mexico". Based on that oral statement, he was deported to Tijuana, Mexico, and given $3 to survive with. Using a stranger's cell phone, Guzman made a call to his brother's wife in the United States explaining his deportation, but the call was disconnected.

Guzman then spent nearly three months in Mexico, destitute. He ate out of dumpsters, bathed in rivers, and slept outdoors. In June 2007, while Guzman was still in Mexico, his family filed a lawsuit to attempt to force the US government to aid in their search for him. The suit was unsuccessful and Guzman's mother, Maria Carbajal, proceeded to search for him herself. She traveled to Tijuana and spent several days in the area looking for him, cooking for workers in a banana warehouse in exchange for shelter in a back room there. He tried to cross the United States–Mexico border several times, but was turned away each time. Guzman was eventually found near the Calexico, California border crossing in August 2007 and reunited with his American family.

Upon his return, Guzman (represented by law firm Morrison & Foerster) filed a separate lawsuit in conjunction with the American Civil Liberties Union (ACLU) alleging racial discrimination and violations of Guzman's constitutional rights. The case was filed in the United States District Court for the Central District of California (CDCA) and assigned to District Judge George H. King. An ICE statement claimed that Guzman's case was "one-of-a-kind". In a House of Representatives subcommittee hearing, Deputy Director Gary E. Mead of the Office of Detention and Removal Operations at ICE said that out of roughly 280,000 people deported in 2007, "only one was a US citizen". The ACLU, however, claimed "ICE lacks even rudimentary safeguards against erroneous determinations." Mead said the ICE is "reviewing its policies and procedures to determine if even greater safeguards can be put in place to prevent the rare instance where this event occurs" and that the process will be completed by May 13, 2008 (90 days from the February 13 hearing).

Guzman "received no assistance from ICE agents -- or anyone else -- in attempting to read or understand" the voluntary release document that he signed. In the United States, detainees held on immigrations violations do not have a 6th Amendment right to counsel.

Guzman has been alleged to be mentally ill and/or developmentally disabled. During custody in LA County, he was given prescription anti-psychotic medications for "hearing voices". He reads and writes at a 2nd-grade level and has trouble remembering information, like his personal phone numbers. Carbajal was quoted as saying, in Spanish, "Sometimes [Guzman] disconnects from reality. He was like that before, but he's worse now."

== Settlement ==
On May 11, 2010, U.S. District Judge King issued an order stating the following:

The Court designates the portion of the Morrison & Foerster Client Trust Account that receives the settlement proceeds in this matter of Three Hundred Fifty Thousand Dollars ($350,000.00) as the Guzman Carbajal Qualified Settlement Fund, the Terms for which are attached as Exhibit 1 to plaintiff's memorandum of points and authorities in support of plaintiffs' motion to approve the Establishment of the Guzman Carbajal Qualified Settlement Fund (document #168) which is incorporated herein by this reference. The Terms of the Guzman Carbajal Qualified Settlement Fund shall be carried out forthwith. The Guzman Carbajal Qualified Settlement Fund shall be governed by the provisions of the regulations that accompany section 468B of Title 26 of the United States Code. The Court retains continuing jurisdiction over the Guzman Carbajal Qualified Settlement Fund and over its Administrator Somnath Raj Chatterjee.

== See also ==
- Deportation of Americans from the United States
- Deportation and removal from the United States
