= Title 8 of the Code of Federal Regulations =

US title on aliens and nationality

CFR Title 8 – Aliens and Nationality is one of fifty titles composing the United States Code of Federal Regulations (CFR), containing the principal set of rules and regulations issued by federal agencies regarding aliens and nationality. It is available in digital and printed form, and can be referenced online using the Electronic Code of Federal Regulations (e-CFR).

== Structure ==
The table of contents, as reflected in the e-CFR updated March 5, 2014, is as follows:

Volume	Chapter	Parts	Regulatory Entity
1	I	1-499	Department of Homeland Security
	V	1000–1399	Executive Office for Immigration Review, Department of Justice
