= Lyttle v. United States =

American legal case

Lyttle v. United States is a legal case that emerged from a series of administrative errors and racial profiling that led to the wrongful deportation of a U.S. natural-born citizen named Mark Lyttle in 2008. Mark Daniel Lyttle is a man with bipolar disorder and cognitive disabilities who became the focus of Immigration and Customs Enforcement (ICE) proceedings while serving a 100-day sentence at Neuse Correctional Institution. During Lyttle's intake at Neuse, a clerk recorded his birthplace as Mexico and his citizenship status as "alien", despite his U.S. citizenship. This triggered ICE involvement.

Lyttle was forced to cross the US-Mexico border with only $3 in his possession, wearing a prison jumpsuit, and without identification or a passport. He then wandered for 125 days through multiple Central American countries, including Mexico, Honduras, Nicaragua, and Guatemala. He experienced homelessness, abuse, and was subsequently imprisoned in Honduras.

The case exposed broader issues within the immigration enforcement system, including racial profiling, the treatment of mentally disabled detainees, the lack of due process in immigration proceedings, and the conditions in private immigration detention facilities. This policy change was later incorporated into the Gang of Eight's Border Security, Economic Opportunity, and Immigration Modernization Act of 2013, which proposed providing legal representation to unaccompanied children and mentally disabled individuals in immigration court.

== History ==
Mark Daniel Lyttle is an American citizen who was wrongfully deported to Mexico in 2008. Born in Rowan County, North Carolina, Lyttle spent his early years in foster care before being adopted at age seven by Thomas and Jeanne Lyttle along with his siblings. Following his adoptive father's death a year later, he was raised by his adoptive mother who worked as an occupational therapy assistant.

Lyttle has several documented medical conditions, including bipolar disorder and diabetes, as well as cognitive difficulties that affect his ability to write. Throughout his adolescence and adult life, he cycled through various mental institutions, jails, and group homes. In 2008, he was sentenced to 100 days for misdemeanor assault after touching a female employee at a facility where he was residing. Prior to this incarceration, he had been a patient at Cherry Hospital, a state psychiatric facility in Goldsboro, North Carolina.

During his intake at Neuse Correctional Institution in August 2008, Lyttle was classified as a Mexican national. The intake clerk, whose identity remains unknown, recorded his race as "Other" and ethnicity as "Oriental", while incorrectly listing his birthplace as Mexico and citizenship status as "alien". These mistakes occurred despite Lyttle's statement that he was born in North Carolina, and the availability of his fingerprint records in FBI databases confirming his U.S. citizenship.

Lyttle spoke no Spanish and has distinctly local English speech patterns. He believes his birth parents were "mixed Puerto Rican and white". He is a U.S. citizen of Puerto Rican descent.

Following his misclassification, ICE deportation officer Dashanta Faucette interviewed Lyttle without conducting a standard criminal history check. During this interview, a new identity was created by the ICE officer for Lyttle, under the name "Jose Thomas". The ICE officer documented him as a Mexican national who had entered the United States illegally at age three. Despite Lyttle consistently signing documents as "Mark Lyttle" and the existence of biometric evidence confirming his U.S. citizenship, ICE proceeded with deportation proceedings.

During this period, Lyttle was unable to contact his family, including his mother, who had temporarily relocated to Kentucky to help care for his brother's son while his brother deployed to Afghanistan.

=== Deportation ===
After completing his assault sentence in October 2008, Lyttle was transferred to Stewart Detention Center near Lumpkin, Georgia, the largest immigration detention facility and private prison in the United States. The facility, operated by CoreCivic Inc. (formerly the Corrections Corporation of America), housed 1,752 beds and was criticized for poor conditions including inadequate healthcare, unsanitary conditions, and alleged guard abuse. During his detention at Stewart, Lyttle was not allowed to receive visitors. He was held at this facility for 53 days.

ICE proceeded with deportation despite multiple inconsistencies in his case. His fingerprint records in FBI databases confirmed his U.S. citizenship and valid Social Security number, and no connection was found between Lyttle and the alias "Jose Thomas". However, ICE officials appeared to selectively use information that supported deportation while disregarding evidence of his citizenship. A 2003 felony assault conviction under his real name was included in his deportation order, while his documented U.S. citizenship status was ignored. Despite consistently signing documents as "Mark Lyttle", he was processed for deportation under the false name Jose Thomas. He was forced to sign a statement admitting to being an illegal immigrant and had to defend himself in court without legal representation. Lyttle was then wrongfully deported to Mexico by Immigration Judge William Cassidy during a mass deportation hearing in 2008. Despite allegedly telling Cassidy twice about his U.S. citizenship, Lyttle was deported to Mexico.

According to American Civil Liberties Union (ACLU) documentation, he was forced to cross the Mexican border with only $3 in his possession, wearing a prison jumpsuit, and without identification or passport. Lyttle then wandered through multiple Central American countries including Mexico, Honduras, Nicaragua, and Guatemala for a total of 125 days. During this time, he experienced homelessness, abuse, and was even imprisoned in Honduras.

His situation was only addressed when a U.S. consular officer in Guatemala investigated his claims of citizenship by contacting Lyttle's brother, who served in the U.S. military and confirmed his citizenship. Lyttle was ultimately able to return to the United States. However, upon arrival at Atlanta airport in April 2009, ICE officials detained him for an additional six days and attempted to deport him again. The case was only resolved through intervention from his family and legal counsel. The Department of Homeland Security ultimately terminated deportation proceedings on April 28, 2009, acknowledging his U.S. citizenship.

Lyttle's case gained significant attention in a lawsuit filed by the American Civil Liberties Union. Lyttle sued the federal government for racial discrimination and constitutional rights violations. Lyttle received a $175,000 settlement from the federal government after a federal district court in Georgia ruled in his favor in 2012.

== Legal and cultural impact ==
Lyttle's case is cited by experts as an example of how weak legal procedural guarantees and difficulties in proving citizenship can lead to mistaken immigration arrests and deportations of American citizens.

According to research by Northwestern University political science professor Jacqueline Stevens, who studied approximately 8,000 cases at two immigration detention facilities, about 1% of detainees were later released after being confirmed as U.S. citizens. These citizens faced detention periods ranging from one week to four years before their release. Stevens estimated that this error rate could result in thousands of U.S. citizens being wrongfully detained each year, and tens of thousands over a decade.

His case is referenced in how political pressure on ICE officers to maintain high deportation numbers contributed to such mistakes. The New Yorker argued that Lyttle's ordeal may have been prevented if the Justice Department's 2013 policy of providing lawyers to mentally disabled defendants in deportation cases had been in place when his case occurred. This policy change was later incorporated into the Gang of Eight's Border Security, Economic Opportunity, and Immigration Modernization Act of 2013, which proposed providing legal representation to unaccompanied children and mentally disabled individuals in immigration court.
