= Your papers, please =

Expression associated with police state functionaries

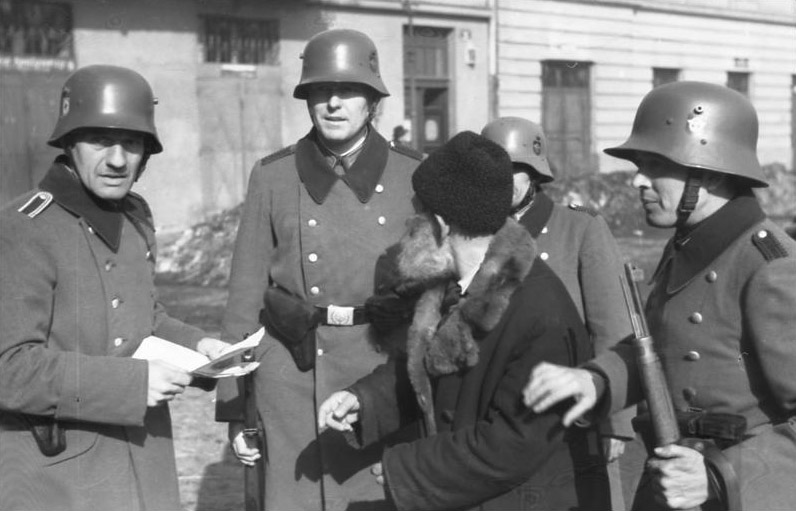
German Ordnungspolizei officers examining a man's papers in Nazi-occupied Poland, 1941

"Your papers, please" (or "papers, please") is an expression or trope associated with police state functionaries demanding identification from civilians during random stops or at checkpoints. It is a cultural metaphor for life in a police state.

The phrase was popularized as the first line in the classic 1942 movie Casablanca which depicted life in Vichy-controlled Casablanca during World War II. The film opens with a scene of police officers searching a hotel for refugees fleeing from Nazi-controlled territory. The first line of the film is spoken by a police officer to a civilian he stopped on the street: "May we see your papers?" The civilian produces a document, but a second police officer declares that it "expired three weeks ago" and begins to tell the civilian he is under arrest. The civilian attempts to flee the police, but a gunshot is heard and the civilian falls to the ground.

== Use in the United Kingdom ==
In 2009, the Conservative Party leader David Cameron used the trope with a German accent whilst criticising the idea of ID cards in the United Kingdom by asking a Q&A session "Where are your papers?".

A report from Big Brother Watch, a London-based nongovernmental privacy advocacy group, says police use of facial recognition technology in public spaces is like people being "asked for their papers without their consent".

== Use in the United States ==
The phrase has been used disparagingly in the debate over Real ID and national ID cards in the United States.

It has also been used to refer to interactions with civilians during police stops and immigration enforcement. Arizona's controversial SB 1070 law requiring people to carry identification was dubbed the "Papers, Please" law.

The phrase has also been used by the press in relation to a February 2017 incident in which U.S. Customs and Border Protection agents searching for a suspect demanded identification from passengers exiting a domestic flight. In January 2018, bus passengers allege that Border Patrol agents boarded a Greyhound bus in Florida and demanded U.S. identification or a passport from all of those on board.

A lawsuit against Glendale, Arizona, police officers alleges that a passenger in a car was tasered on the genitals after he asked an officer why he needed to identify himself during a 2017 traffic stop.

During the COVID-19 pandemic, the phrase was used to refer to vaccine mandate policies enacted in places like New York City.

During the second presidency of Donald Trump, the phrase has been used to describe the process of immigration agents requesting proof of citizenship from suspected undocumented immigrants.

== See also ==
- Papers, Please
- Stop and identify statutes
- Kavanaugh stop
- Terry stop
