= JD Natasha =

American rock musician (born 1988)

- Born: Natasha Jeannette Dueñas; February 27, 1988 (age 38); Kendall, Florida; United States
- Genres: Pop; Rock; Alternative; Latin American music
- Occupations: Musician, songwriter
- Instruments: Vocals, guitar
- Years active: 2004–present
- Labels: EMI, Warner Music Group

JD Natasha (born Natasha Jeannette Dueñas) is an American rock musician. Natasha began her musical career as a solo singer-songwriter, singing and playing her music on the guitar. Later, she co-founded other ensembles.

== Early life ==
JD Natasha was born to an Argentine father and a Cuban American mother. She is the second of four children, sister of Jonathan Dueñas (Jae Coop), and grew up in Miami, Florida. She graduated from Coral Reef Senior High School. She started singing in her Church Choir at five and wrote her first song at 11.

== Career ==
JD Natasha released her debut album Imperfecta-Imperfect on July 13, 2004, on the EMI International record label. The album, with tracks in both English and Spanish, exposed her to a new market of other Latin artists who have crossed over into the American market. She received acclaim as the best new Hispanic bilingual artist from Emilio Estefan as the "Top Pick in Emilio Estefan/People en Español’s 'Best of 2004'". In addition, she received praise from Newsday, The Miami Herald, Los Angeles Times, and the Associated Press.

In May 2008, Natasha formed the indie-rock act "Fancy Me Yet" with bandmates Alex Darren and Chris Bernard. She now goes by her married name, Natasha De Renzis and has a band called Condors and Chaos which released the singles "Drug" and "Dust" in 2024. Of her career trajectory Natasha has stated, "I was nominated for three Latin Grammys. Though I am very proud, it’s not something I wear on my sleeve because I don’t want to be 'judged' by it. I chose to step away from that career path because I was feeling lost and unhappy with the direction the label wanted the next record to go in. I was in a very dark place, very young and rebellious. I guess I’m still a little rebellious. Music business is hard, and I’m much more content playing what I love rather than heading in the direction I was being taken in. I hope people enjoy our music as much as I do!"
