= Juanes discography =

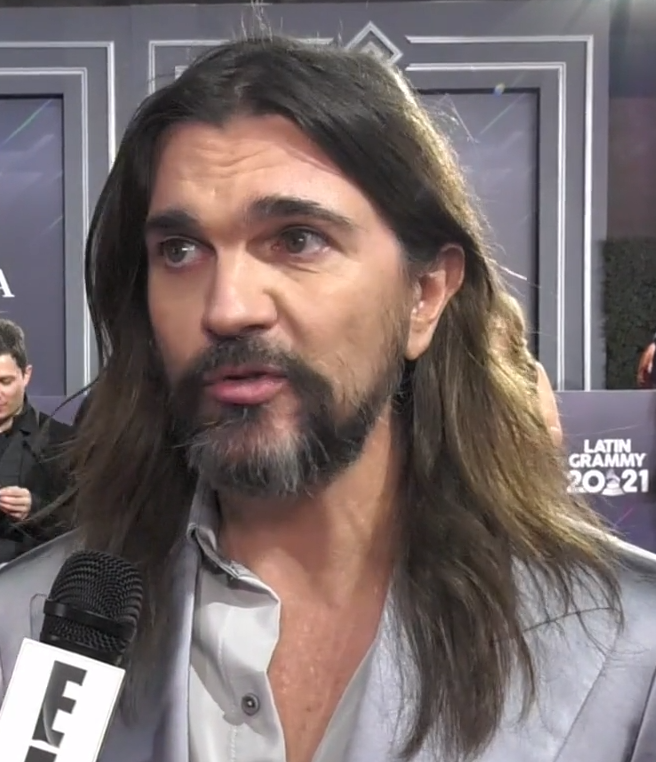
- Juanes in 2022
- Studio albums: 10
- Live albums: 3
- Singles: 51

Colombian Latin rock singer-songwriter Juanes has sold an estimated 15 million records worldwide.

== Albums ==
=== Studio albums ===
List of studio albums, with selected chart positions, sales figures and certifications
Title	Album details	Peak chart positions										Certifications	Sales
Title	Album details	ARG	BEL	FRA	GER	MEX	NLD	SPA	SWI	US Latin	US	Certifications	Sales
Fíjate Bien	Released: 17 October 2000; Label: Universal Music Group; Formats: CD	—	—	—	—	—	—	—	—	36	—	RIAA: Platinum (Latin)	World: 1,000,000 (as of 2010); US: 100,000 (as of 2007)
Un Día Normal	Released: 21 May 2002; Label: Universal Music Group; Formats: CD	5	91	—	—	1	28	17	80	1	110	AFP: Gold; AMPROFON: 2× Platinum+Gold; CAPIF: Platinum; PROMUSICAE: 2× Platinum; RIAA: 18× Platinum (Latin)	World: 2,000,000 (as of 2010); US: 700,000 (as of 2007)
Mi Sangre	Released: 28 September 2004; Label: Universal Music Group; Formats: CD, digital download	7	2	8	1	2	4	1	3	1	33	AFP: Platinum; AMPROFON: 2× Platinum; BVMI: 3× Gold; CAPIF: 2× Platinum; PROMUSICAE: 3× Platinum; IFPI FIN: Platinum; IFPI SWI: Platinum; RIAA: 2× Diamond (Latin)	World: 4,000,000 (as of 2014); US: 731,000 (as of 2014)
La Vida... Es Un Ratico	Released: 23 October 2007; Label: Universal Music Group; Formats: CD, digital download	2	74	21	11	1	20	1	3	1	13	AMPROFON: Gold; CAPIF: Gold; PROMUSICAE: 2× Platinum; IFPI SWI: Gold	World: 2,000,000 (as of 2011); US: 300,000 (as of 2011)
P.A.R.C.E.	Released: 7 December 2010; Label: Universal Music Group; Formats: CD, LP, digital download	—	—	—	—	12	—	14	—	2	165	PROMUSICAE: Gold	World: 1,000,000 (as of 2011); US: 42,000 (as of 2014)
Loco de Amor	Released: 11 March 2014; Label: Universal Music Group; Formats: CD, digital download	8	—	—	—	3	—	43	75	2	36	ASINCOL: 12× Platinum; AMPROFON: Gold	
Mis planes son amarte	Released: 12 May 2017; Label: Universal Music Group; Formats: CD, digital download	1	—	—	—	8	—	17	—	1	77	AMPROFON: Gold	
Más futuro que pasado	Released: 22 November 2019; Label: Universal Music Group; Formats: CD, digital download	—	—	—	—	—	—	48	—	9	—	RIAA: Gold (Latin)	
Origen	Released: 28 May 2021; Label: Universal Music Group; Formats: CD, digital download	—	—	—	—	—	—	—	—	—	—		
Vida Cotidiana	Released: 19 May 2023; Label: Universal Music Group; Formats: CD, digital download	—	—	—	—	—	—	—	—	—	—		
"—" denotes a title that did not chart, or was not released in that territory.

=== Live albums ===
List of live albums, with selected chart positions
Title	Album details	Peak chart positions				Certifications
Title	Album details	SPA	MEX	US Latin	US	Certifications
La Vida... Es Un Ratico (En Vivo)	Released: 25 November 2008; Label: Universal Music Group; Formats: CD, DVD	—	—	36	—	
MTV Unplugged	Released: 29 May 2012; Label: Universal Music Group; Formats: CD, DVD, Blu-ray, LP, CD/DVD	3	1	1	52	ASINCOL: 12× Platinum; AMPROFON: Gold; PROMUSICAE: Platinum; RIAA: Gold (Latin)
Tigo Music Sessions	Released: 15 August 2014; Label: Universal Music Group; Formats: DVD, Stream	—	—	—	—	ASINCOL: 2× Diamond
"—" denotes a title that did not chart, or was not released in that territory.

== Singles ==
=== As lead artist ===
List of singles as main artist, with selected chart positions and certifications
Title	Year	Peak chart positions										Certifications	Album
Title	Year	AUT	BEL	FRA	GER	MEX	NL	SPA	SWI	US Latin	US	Certifications	Album
"Fíjate Bien"	2000	—	—	—	—	—	—	13	—	—	—		Fíjate Bien
"Podemos Hacernos Daño"	2000	—	—	—	—	—	—	—	—	—	—		Fíjate Bien
"Nada"	2001	—	—	—	—	—	—	—	—	18	—		Fíjate Bien
"A Dios le Pido"	2002	19	19	12	31	1	15	1	7	2	—^{[A]}	RIAA: 12× Platinum (Latin)	Un Día Normal
"Es Por Ti"	2002	—	10	—	—	1	97	1	—	4	—	RIAA: 9× Platinum (Latin)	Un Día Normal
"Mala Gente"	2003	—	—	—	—	—	—	—	—	12	—		Un Día Normal
"Fotografía" (featuring Nelly Furtado)	2003	—	—	—	—	2	—	—	—	1	—^{[B]}	RIAA: 6× Platinum (Latin)	Un Día Normal
"La Paga" (featuring Taboo)	2003	—	3	—	91	—	—	—	—	5	—		Un Día Normal
"Nada Valgo Sin Tu Amor"	2004	—	—	—	—	1	—	1	—	1	—^{[C]}		Mi Sangre
"Volverte a Ver"	2004	40	—	—	28	1	—	1	—	1	—		Mi Sangre
"La Camisa Negra"	2005	1	1	1	1	1	3	1	1	1	89	BEA: Gold; BVMI: Gold; IFPI SWI: Gold; RIAA: Gold	Mi Sangre
"Para Tu Amor"	2005	—	—	—	—	—	36	6	—	10	—	ABPD: Gold	Mi Sangre
"Lo Que Me Gusta a Mí"	2005	—	—	—	—	—	—	—	—	2	94		Mi Sangre
"Me Enamora"	2007	34	18	12	29	1	48	1	13	1	69	AMPROFON: 2× Diamond; PROMUSICAE: 2× Platinum	La Vida... Es Un Ratico
"Gotas de Agua Dulce"	2008	—	—	—	—	1	—	10	—	1	—^{[D]}		La Vida... Es Un Ratico
"Tres"	2008	—	—	—	—	—	82	—	—	21	—		La Vida... Es Un Ratico
"Odio por Amor"	2008	—	—	—	—	—	—	5	—	5	—^{[E]}		La Vida... Es Un Ratico en vivo
"Yerbatero"	2010	—	—	—	—	7	—	25	—	1	—^{[F]}		P.A.R.C.E.
"Y No Regresas"	2010	—	—	—	—	8	—	—	—	9	—		P.A.R.C.E.
"Regalito"	2011	—	—	—	—	—	—	—	—	—	—		P.A.R.C.E.
"La Señal"	2012	—	82	—	—	1	—	50	—	1	—^{[G]}		Juanes MTV Unplugged
"Me Enamora" (MTV Unplugged version)	2012	—	—	—	—	10	—	—	—	2	—		Juanes MTV Unplugged
"La Luz"	2013	—	—	—	—	4	—	41	—	11	—		Loco de Amor
"Mil Pedazos"	2014	—	—	—	—	18	—	—	—	47	—		Loco de Amor
"Una Flor"	2014	—	—	—	—	27	—	—	—	28	—		Loco de Amor
"Juntos (Together)"	2015	—	—	—	—	25	—	62	—	11	—		McFarland, US OST
"Fuego"	2016	—	—	—	—	1	—	21	—	18			Mis Planes Son Amarte
"Hermosa Ingrata"	2017	—	—	—	—	—	—	—	—	—	—		Mis Planes Son Amarte
"Besos En Guerra" (with Morat)	2017	—	—	—	—	34	—	22	—	—	—	RIAA: Platinum (Latin)	Balas perdidas
"Pa dentro"	2018	—	—	—	—	—	—	91	—	41	—	RIAA: Platinum (Latin)	Más futuro que pasado
"La Plata" (featuring Lalo Ebratt)	2019	—	—	—	—	1	—	35	—	40	—	AMPROFON: Gold; RIAA: Platinum (Latin)	Más futuro que pasado
"Querer Mejor" (featuring Alessia Cara)	2019	—	—	—	—	1	—	—	—	—	—	RIAA: Gold (Latin)	Más futuro que pasado
"Bonita" (with Sebastián Yatra)	2019	—	—	—	—	—	—	71	—	42	—	AMPROFON: Gold; RIAA: Gold (Latin)	Más futuro que pasado
"Los Huesos" (with Dani Martín)	2020	—	—	—	—	—	—	80	—	—	—		
"Via Lactea"	2020	—	—	—	—	—	—	—	—	—	—		
"506" (with Morat)	2022	—	—	—	—	—	—	77	—	—	—		
"Una Noche Contigo"	2025	—	—	—	—	—	—	—	—	—	—		TBA
"—" denotes a title that did not chart, or was not released in that territory.

=== As featured artist ===
List of singles, with selected chart positions
Title	Year	Peak chart positions							Certifications	Album
Title	Year	AUT	GER	NLD	SPA	SWI	US Latin Pop	US Latin	Certifications	Album
"Il mio canto libero" (Laura Pausini featuring Juanes)	2007	—	—	—	—	34	11	—		Io canto
"Te Busqué" (Nelly Furtado featuring Juanes)	2007	25	16	11	—	79	24	—		Loose
"Somos El Mundo 25 Por Haiti" (with Artists for Haiti)	2010	—	—	—	31	—	—	—		Charity single
"Ay Haiti" (with Artists for Haiti)	2010	—	—	—	1	—	—	—		Charity single
"Gracias a la Vida" (with Artists for Chile)	2010	—	—	—	—	—	—	—		Charity single
"La Calle" (Juan Luis Guerra featuring Juanes)	2010	—	—	—	—	—	9	24		A Son de Guerra
"La Jaula de Oro" (Los Tigres del Norte featuring Juanes)	2011	—	—	—	—	—	—	—		MTV Unplugged: Los Tigres del Norte and Friends
"La Flaca" (Santana featuring Juanes)	2014	—	—	—	42	—	15	45		Corazón
"Un Paso Hacia La Paz" (with Artists for #SoyCapaz)	2014	—	—	—	—	—	—	—		—N/a
"Querida" (Juan Gabriel featuring Juanes)	2015	—	—	—	—	—	25	46		Los Dúo
"Hands" (Various Artists for Orlando)	2016	—	—	—	—	—	—	—		—N/a
"Amárrame" (Mon Laferte feat. Juanes)	2017	—	—	—	—	—	—	—		La Trenza
"—" denotes a title that did not chart, or was not released in that territory.

Notes

- A. "A Dios le Pido" has been released on two separate occasions – 2002 release in Latin America and the United States, and the final re-release was in 2005 in Europe as second single of his third studio album Mi Sangre. The song did not enter the Billboard Hot 100, but peaked at number 19 on the Bubbling Under Hot 100 Singles chart.
- B. "Fotografía" did not enter the Billboard Hot 100, but peaked at number 16 on the Bubbling Under Hot 100 Singles chart.
- C. "Nada Valgo Sin Tu Amor" did not enter the Billboard Hot 100, but peaked at number 4 on the Bubbling Under Hot 100 Singles chart.
- D. "Gotas de Agua Dulce" did not enter the Billboard Hot 100, but peaked at number 2 on the Bubbling Under Hot 100 Singles chart.
- E. "Odio por Amor" did not enter the Billboard Hot 100, but peaked at number 25 on the Bubbling Under Hot 100 Singles chart.
- F. "Yerbatero" did not enter the Billboard Hot 100, but peaked at number 17 on the Bubbling Under Hot 100 Singles chart.
- G. "La Señal" did not enter the Billboard Hot 100, but peaked at number 19 on the Bubbling Under Hot 100 Singles chart.

== Other certified songs ==
List of songs as main artist, with selected chart positions and certifications
Title	Year	Peak chart positions	Certifications	Album
Title	Year	MEX	Certifications	Album
"Tequila" (with Christian Nodal)	2019	1	RIAA: Gold (Latin)	Más futuro que pasado

== Guest appearances ==
List of non-single guest appearances, with other performing artists, showing year released and album name
Title	Year	Other performer(s)	Album
"Dame la Mano"	2002	Ketama	Voices of Hope: Sabera Foundation
"A Tu Lado"	2006	Antonio Carmona	Vengo Venenoso
"Il mio canto libero"	2006	Laura Pausini	Io canto
"The Shadow of Your Smile"	2006	Tony Bennett	Duets: An American Classic
"Nada Particular"	2007	Miguel Bosé	Papito
"Lago Calima"	2008	Arthur Hanlon	Piano Sin Fronteras
"Volverte a Ver"	2008	Raphel	50 Años Después
"La Tierra"	2010	Herbie Hancock	The Imagine Project

== Music videos ==
List of music videos, showing year released, director and album
Title	Year	Director(s)	Album
"Fíjate Bien"	2000	Simón Brand	Fíjate Bien
"Podemos Hacernos Daño"	2001	Pablo Croce	Fíjate Bien
"Nada"	2001	Gustavo Garzón	Fíjate Bien
"A Dios le Pido"	2002	Gustavo Garzón	Un Día Normal
"Es Por Ti"	2002	Gustavo Garzón	Un Día Normal
"Mala Gente"	2003	Picky Talarico	Un Día Normal
"Fotografía" (featuring Nelly Furtado)	2003	Picky Talarico	Un Día Normal
"La Paga" (Album & Remix versions)	2003	Jason Archer/Paul Beck	Un Día Normal
"Nada Valgo Sin Tu Amor"	2004	Rogelio Sikander	Mi Sangre
"Volverte a Ver"	2004	Gustavo Garzón	Mi Sangre
"La Camisa Negra"	2005	Rogelio Sikander	Mi Sangre
"Para Tu Amor"	2005	Picky Talarico	Mi Sangre
"Rosario Tijeras"	2005	Viviana Diaz/Emiliano Menéndez	Mi Sangre
"Me Enamora"	2007	Aggressive	La Vida… Es un Ratico
"Gotas de Agua Dulce"	2008	Picky Talarico	La Vida… Es un Ratico
"Tres"	2008	Vince Haycock	La Vida… Es un Ratico
"Odio por Amor"	2008	Agustín Alberdi	La Vida… Es un Ratico
"Yerbatero"	2010	Brandon Parvini	P.A.R.C.E.
"Y No Regresas"	2010	Lex Halaby	P.A.R.C.E.
"La Luz"	2013	Jessy Terrero	Loco de Amor
"Mil Pedazos"	2014	Unknown	Loco de Amor
"Loco de Amor"	2014	Unknown	Loco de Amor
"Delirio"	2014	Unknown	Loco de Amor
"Una Flor"	2014	Unknown	Loco de Amor
"Me Enamoré de Ti"	2014	Unknown	Loco de Amor
"Fuego"	2016	Kacho Lopez Mari	Mis Planes Son Amarte
"Hermosa Ingrata"	2016	Unknown	Mis Planes Son Amarte
"Ángel"	2017	Unknown	Mis Planes Son Amarte
"Pa' Dentro"	2018	Greg & Lio	Más Futuro Que Pasado
"La Plata" (featuring Lalo Ebratt)	2018	36 Grados	Más Futuro Que Pasado
"Querer Mejor" (featuring Alessia Cara)	2019	Aaron A	Más Futuro Que Pasado
"Bonita" (featuring Sebastián Yatra)	2019	Fernando Lugo	Más Futuro Que Pasado
"Tequila" (featuring Christian Nodal)	2019	Unknown	Más Futuro Que Pasado
"Más Futuro Que Pasado"	2019	Unknown	Más Futuro Que Pasado
"El Pueblo"	2019	Unknown	Más Futuro Que Pasado
"Mía Mía" (featuring Fuego)	2019	Óscar Vásquez	Más Futuro Que Pasado
"Ninguna"	2019	U&D	Más Futuro Que Pasado
"Loco"	2019	Óscar Vásquez	Más Futuro Que Pasado
"Mala Manera"	2019	U&D	Más Futuro Que Pasado
"El Amor Después del Amor"	2021	Unknown	Origen
"Dancing in the Dark"	2021	Unknown	Origen
"No Tengo Dinero"	2021	Unknown	Origen
"Sin Medir Distancias"	2021	Unknown	Origen
"La Bilirrubina"	2021	Unknown	Origen
"Amores Prohibidos"	2022	Unknown	Vida Cotidiana
"Gris"	2023	Unknown	Vida Cotidiana
"Ojalá"	2023	Unknown	Vida Cotidiana
"Veneno"	2023	Unknown	Vida Cotidiana
"Cecilia" (featuring Juan Luis Guerra)	2023	Unknown	Vida Cotidiana
"Canción Desaparecida" (featuring Mabiland)	2023	Unknown	Vida Cotidiana
"Vida Cotidiana"	2023	Unknown	Vida Cotidiana
"Mayo"	2023	Unknown	Vida Cotidiana
"Cecilia"	2023	Unknown	Vida Cotidiana
"Veneno"	2023	Unknown	Vida Cotidiana
"Corazón de Imán (Homenaje a Medellín)"	2024	Unknown	non-album
"Una Noche Contigo"	2025	Unknown	TBA

== Collaborations in music videos ==
List of music videos, performer, showing year released, director and album
Title	Performer	Year	Director(s)	Album
"Somos el Mundo"	Artists for Haiti	2010	Unknown	Charity single
"Ay, Haiti!"	Various Artists	2010	Borja Crespo	Charity single
"Gracias a la Vida"	Voces Unidas por Chile	2010	Cristian Calderón	Charity single
"La Calle"	Juan Luis Guerra	2010	Jean Gabriel Guerra	A Son de Guerra
"La Flaca"	Santana	2014	Unknown	Corazón
"Amárrame"	Mon Laferte	2017	Gamaliel de Santiago Ruvalcaba and Alex Arbesú	La Trenza
