= MTV Unplugged (Juanes album) =

Juanes: MTV Unplugged

Live album by Juanes
- Released: May 28, 2012
- Recorded: February 1, 2012 at the New World Symphony Center, Miami Beach, Florida
- Genre: Acoustic music; latin rock; pop rock
- Length: 55:48
- Language: Spanish
- Label: Universal Music Latino
- Producer: Esteban Aristizábal; Juan Luis Guerra

Juanes chronology
P.A.R.C.E (2010)	Juanes: MTV Unplugged (2012)	Loco de Amor (2014)

Juanes video chronology
La Vida... Es Un Ratico: En Vivo (2008)	Juanes MTV Unplugged (2012)	Tigo Music Sessions (2014)

Singles from MTV Unplugged
- 1. "La Señal" Released: March 5, 2012; 2. "Hoy Me Voy" Released: March 24, 2012; 3. "Me Enamora" Released: May 14, 2012

Juanes: MTV Unplugged is the second live album of Colombian singer Juanes. It was recorded before a live audience at the New World Symphony Center in Miami Beach, Florida, on February 1, 2012, and was released by Universal Music Latino on May 29, 2012. The album includes featured performances by the Spanish composer Joaquín Sabina and the Brazilian singer Paula Fernandes. The album features rearranged takes on Juanes' hit songs like "Me Enamora", "La Camisa Negra" and "A Dios le Pido". The first single of the live album was released on March 5, 2012, called La Señal, which became a hit in Latin America. The second single was "Me Enamora", with new instrumental arrangements, and was released two days after of the album's release. The album featured three new songs, one of which was a collaboration with Joaquín Sabina. The album debuted at number one on the Billboard Top Latin Albums Chart and won the 2012 Latin Grammy for Album of the Year. This was the third time he won Album of the Year at the Latin Grammys.

== Background ==
Juanes "La Señal"

Following the release of his previous album, P.A.R.C.E. (2010), Juanes embarked on a tour to promote the album. However, the tour was canceled in the United States in May 2011 following the separation with his former manager Fernán Martínez, who labeled his last album a commercial failure, and the desire to spend time with his family. Martínez also affirmed that Juanes was experiencing depression and personal problems and would retire for a few years which Juanes's wife denied. In December 2011, Juanes announced that he would record a live album as part of the MTV Unplugged series. He stated the months he spent with his family was "a time of importance to strengthen my inner reflection and to come back with the desire and love I've always had to music."

== Development ==
Juanes MTV Unplugged was recorded was on 1 February 2012 at the New World Center in Miami, Florida. Juanes worked as producer with Dominican musician Juan Luis Guerra with the discussion of collaborating on an album together began several months. Previously, the two performed on the duet song "La Calle" on Juan Luis Guerra's studio album A Son de Guerra (2010).

Later, in December 2011, the Colombian singer announced that he would record a new edition of MTV Unplugged that would be produced by Juan Luis Guerra and released in February 2012. On February 1, 2012, Juanes recorded at New World Symphony Center, Miami, FL, accompanied with 16 musicians, including guitarists, pianists and trumpeters, as well as a choir of 32 people to perform the previously released song "Odio por Amor". On the show, the singer performed 14 songs, three of which were new exclusively for the MTV Unplugged; "Todo En Mi Vida Eres Tú", "La Señal" and "Azul Sabina", the last with the participation of the Spanish musician Joaquin Sabina. The Brazilian singer Paula Fernandes also accompanied him on the song "Hoy Me Voy", which was a bilingual version in both Portuguese and Spanish. MTV Unplugged was directed by Ivan Dudynsky.

== Critical reception ==
Many music critics wrote about the live album. David Jeffries of Allmusic praised the work the people sing all the songs all the time. Jeffries said "Tr3s presents Juanes: MTV Unplugged" is an uplifting celebration of the work of a Colombian artist, who also offers a rare combination, spectacular and organic.". Larry Rohter of New York Times wrote that for the Hispanic market, this is a true meeting of titans, and a generational thing with mass appeal: "Juan Luis Guerra knows how to get people dancing with beautiful melodies but also writes complex lyrics. Juanes is the same proposition a generation later, more from a rock world, but with deep lyrics and great craftsmanship. And then Sabina is a generation ahead of Juan Luis, a bohemian artist who has been challenging the status quo since the ’70s."

Carlos Quintana of About.com said that there is much to talk about the album, but nevertheless, the most important about this work is the fact where his career is divided in two parts. In fact, "Juanes MTV Unplugged" show us a solid work under a musical path that this famous Latin pop star wants to continue. Being released the second month of the year, Quintana considered it as the best Latin album of the 2012. In the review he highlighted two tracks. Of the first, "Azul Sabina", he said that this song opens an exploration field and reflects the wish of Juanes to explore other rhythms, "If this kind of stuff is what Juanes is planning to produce in the future, I am definitely looking forward to the next album." Of the second, "La Señal", he said that is the song with the most meaning on the album. This song shows signals that he needed to go ahead. Due to this, this single showed the feeling and soul that he put into his music, something that characterizes it. Mauro Ferreira of Notas Musicais, criticized the new songs, calling the praised the featurings of Paula Fernandes and Joaquin Sabina and the presence of the singer on stage. To finish the professional review, he stated: Closure impressive for this MTV Unplugged giving (any) time to Juanes to revitalize his work.

== Chart performance ==
The album and was certified gold in the U.S., Mexico, Spain and Venezuela and 12 times platinum in Colombia, where Juanes was recognized with the media during a press conference held in the capital of that country. "Juanes MTV Unplugged" will turn into the hard to reach in less time sales record this also becomes the best-selling music DVD in history in Colombia.

"Juanes MTV Unplugged" peaked at #1 of the Billboard Latin Albums Chart and #1 on the Billboard Latin Pop Albums. The album also debuted on the Billboard 200 at #52.

== Promotion ==
A few days after the confirmation of his then-upcoming appearance on MTV Unplugged, the TV channel released a contest for US residents called "MTV Demo: Concurso Unplug con Juanes" (English: Unplug contest with Juanes). The contest challenging the contestants to record a video of themselves singing a Juanes song and the winner had a possibility to attend the concert with the singer.

=== Singles ===
- "La Señal" was released as the first official single and had its premiere on radio and digital download on March 5, 2012. The single topped the most of Latin countries like Mexico, Colombia, Venezuela and also topped US Latin Song Charts.
- "Me Enamora", was re-released on May 14, 2012, to digital as the second single. This new version with new instrumental arrangements.

== Awards ==
=== Grammy Awards ===
At the 2013 Grammy Awards, the album won at the Best Latin Pop Album category.

=== Latin Grammy Awards ===
At the 13th Annual Latin Grammy Awards in 2012, the album received two awards:

- Album of the Year
- Best Long Form Music Video

=== Lo Nuestro Awards ===
- Lo Nuestro Award for Rock/Alternative Album of the Year (nominee).

== Track listing ==
This track listing adapted from the liner notes and the deluxe edition is the same track list but on video version.

No.	Title	Writer(s)	Length
1.	"Fíjate Bien"	Juanes	03:54
2.	"La Paga"	Juanes	03:34
3.	"Nada Valgo Sin Tu Amor"	Juanes	03:45
4.	"Es Por Tí"	Juanes	04:56
5.	"Todo En Mi Vida Eres Tú"	Juanes; Juan Luis Guerra	03:48
6.	"A Dios le Pido"	Juanes	03:42
7.	"Hoy Me Voy" (Featuring Paula Fernandes)	Juanes	04:20
8.	"Volverte a Ver"	Juanes	04:30
9.	"La Camisa Negra"	Juanes	03:46
10.	"Azul Sabina" (Featuring Joaquín Sabina)	Juanes; Joaquín Sabina	03:47
11.	"Para Tu Amor"	Juanes	03:55
12.	"La Señal"	Juanes; Juan Luis Guerra	03:35
13.	"Me Enamora"	Juanes	03:21
14.	"Odio por Amor"	Juanes	05:09

iTunes Store (Deluxe edition) (Videos)
No.	Title	Writer(s)	Length
15.	"Fíjate Bien"	Juanes	03:54
16.	"La Paga"	Juanes	03:34
17.	"Nada Valgo Sin Tu Amor"	Juanes
18.	"Es Por Tí"	Juanes
19.	"Todo en Mi Vida Eres Tú"	Juanes
20.	"A Dios le Pido"	Juanes
21.	"Hoy Me Voy" (featuring Paula Fernandes)	Juanes
22.	"Volverte a Ver"	Juanes
23.	"La Camisa Negra"	Juanes
24.	"Azul Sabina" (featuring Joaquín Sabina)
25.	"Para Tu Amor"
26.	"La Señal"	Juanes	03:43
27.	"Me Enamora"	Juanes
28.	"Odio por Amor"	Juanes
29.	"Fotografía" (featuring Emanuela Bellezza (Audio Only))	Juanes

== Charts ==
Chart (2012)	Peak position
Mexican Albums (Top 100 Mexico)	1
Spanish Albums (PROMUSICAE)	3
US Billboard 200	52
US Top Latin Albums (Billboard)	1
US Latin Pop Albums (Billboard)	1

=== Certifications ===
Region	Certification	Certified units/sales
Colombia (ASINCOL)	—	250,000
Colombia (ASINCOL) DVD	12× Platinum	120,000
Mexico (AMPROFON)	Gold	30,000^{^}
Spain (PROMUSICAE)	Gold	20,000^{^}
United States (RIAA)	Gold (Latin)	50,000^{^}
Venezuela (APFV)	Gold	
^{^} Shipments figures based on certification alone.
