= Bellezza =

Bellezza (Italian: "beauty") may refer to:

- Dario Bellezza (1944–1996), Italian poet
- Giovanni Bellezza (1807–1876), Italian sculptor
- Emanuela Bellezza (1984), Italian-American singer
- La bellezza, album by Cristiano Malgioglio 2014

== See also ==
- Belleza (disambiguation) (Spanish spelling)
