= Tigo Music Sessions =

Live album by Juanes
- Released: 15 August 2014
- Recorded: February 2014
- Length: 27:06 (DVD and streamed audio)
- Label: Universal Music Colombia

Juanes chronology
Loco de Amor (2014)	Tigo Music Sessions (2014)	Mis Planes Son Amarte (2017)

Juanes video chronology
MTV Unplugged (2012)	Tigo Music Sessions (2014)

Tigo Music Sessions is the third live album by Colombian recording artist Juanes. The album was released in two commercial music formats, the first was on DVD format that was distributed through Colombian newspaper El Tiempo, in the editions of August 15 and 16 of 2014. The second was an exclusive release to commercial music streaming service Deezer, sponsored by Tigo Music released on August 15, 2014 by Universal Music Latin. The live album served to hold the promotion of his sixth studio album Loco de Amor.

== Track listing ==
Tigo Music Sessions — Streamed audio
No.	Title	Writer(s)	Producer(s)	Length
1.	"Mil Pedazos"	Juanes, Emmanuel del Real	Steve Lillywhite	3:23
2.	"Loco de Amor"	Juanes, Raquel Borges	Lillywhite	3:32
3.	"La Luz"	Juanes	Lillywhite	3:24
4.	"Una Flor"	Juanes, Fernando Tobón	Lillywhite	3:49
5.	"Delirio"	Juanes	Lillywhite	4:11
6.	"Me Enamoré de Ti"	Juanes, Miguel Bosé	Lillywhite	4:29
7.	"Es Por Ti"	Juanes	Lillywhite	4:18
Total length:				27:06

DVD (Only Colombia)
No.	Title	Length
1.	"Mil Pedazos"	3:23
2.	"Loco de Amor"	3:32
3.	"La Luz"	3:24
5.	"Delirio"	4:11
6.	"Me Enamoré de Ti"	4:29
7.	"Entrevista + Detrás de Cámaras"	4:30
8.	"La Luz" (Music video)	3:38
9.	"Mil Pedazos" (Music video)	3:21

== Release history ==
Region	Date	Format	Label
Bolivia	August 15, 2014	Stream	Universal Music Latino
Colombia	August 15, 2014	Stream, DVD	Universal Music Latino
El Salvador	August 15, 2014	Stream	Universal Music Latino
Guatemala	August 15, 2014	Stream	Universal Music Latino
Honduras	August 15, 2014	Stream	Universal Music Latino
Paraguay	October 2, 2014	Stream	Universal Music Latino
