= Belleza =

Belleza (Spanish "beauty") may refer to:

- Noven Belleza (born 1994), Filipino singer-songwriter
- La Belleza, Santander Colombia
- Belleza Argentina, beauty contest
- Admiral Belleza in Skies of Arcadia#Characters

== Music ==
- "La Belleza", single by Marta Sánchez Mi Mundo (Marta Sánchez album)
- "La Belleza", song by Mercedes Sosa Al Despertar 1998
- "La Belleza", song by Mijares from Éxitos Eternos (Mijares album)
- "La Belleza", song by Luis Eduardo Aute from Mano a Mano (Silvio Rodríguez and Luis Eduardo Aute album)
- "La Belleza", song by Miguel Bosé from Girados en Concierto 2002

== See also ==
- Bellezza (disambiguation) (Italian spelling)
