= La Vida... Es Un Ratico: En Vivo =

La Vida... Es Un Ratico (En Vivo)

Live album by Juanes
- Released: November 18, 2008
- Recorded: 2008
- Genre: Latin rock, Pop rock
- Length: 52:48
- Label: Universal Music Latino
- Producer: Juanes

Juanes chronology
La Vida... Es Un Ratico (2007)	La Vida... Es Un Ratico (En Vivo) (2008)	P.A.R.C.E (2010)

Juanes video chronology
Mi Sangre Tour Edition (2005)	La Vida... Es un Ratico (en vivo) (2008)	Juanes MTV Unplugged (2012)

Singles from La Vida... Es Un Ratico (En Vivo)
- 1. "Odio por Amor"; 2. "Hoy Me Voy"; 3. "Tres"

Professional ratings
Review scores
Source	Rating
AllMusic	link

La Vida... Es Un Ratico (En Vivo) is the first live album of Colombian singer Juanes. It was released on November 18, 2008 through Universal Music Latino.

== Background ==
Juanes relaunched this album with live tracks recorded during his tour in Europe and the United States, plus three previously unreleased "Falsas Palabras", recorded over a year ago in Los Angeles, California, co-produced by Gustavo Santaolalla and himself, "Odio Por Amor". He composed a few months ago in Spain and is the first cut for the dissemination of this board, and "Hoy Me Voy" with the singing sensation Colbie Caillat where she plays his part in English. It also includes seven tracks recorded live during his tour "La vida World Tour" including the legendary theme of Joe Arroyo, "Rebelión". The release is available in standard edition and deluxe version with two discs and two DVDs.

== Songs ==
=== Disc 1 ===
1. "Odio Por Amor" - 04:09
2. "Falsas Palabras" - 4:05
3. "No Creo En El Jamás" - 03:33
4. "Clase De Amor" - 03:54
5. "Me Enamora" - 3:12
6. "Hoy Me Voy" - 3:23
7. "La Vida... Es Un Ratico" - 04:04
8. "Gotas De Agua Dulce" - 03:09
9. "La Mejor Parte De Mí" - 03:43
10. "Minas Piedras" (Dueto Con Calamaro) - 04:06
11. "Tú Y Yo" - 04:27
12. "Báilala" - 03:32
13. "Difícil" - 04:02
14. "Tres" - 03:26
15. "Bandera De Manos" (Dueto Con Campino) - 04:07
16. "Bandera De Manos" - 04:04
17. "Hoy Me Voy" (Dueto Con Colbie Caillat) - 03:24

=== Disc 2 ===
1. "Clase De amor"(live) - 04:15
2. "Bandera De Manos" (live) - 04:13
3. "Nada Valgo Sin Tú Amor" (live) - 03:47
4. "Me Enamora" (live) - 04:12
5. "Báilala" (live) - 03:39
6. "Hoy Me Voy" (live) - 03:38
7. "Rebelión" (live) - 05:33

=== DVD ===
1. "Me Enamora" (videoclip) - 3:11
2. "Gotas De Agua Dulce" (videoclip) - 3:14
3. "Tres" (videoclip) - 3:26
4. "Odio por amor" (detrás de cámaras) - 2:51
5. "Odio por amor" (videoclip) - 4
