= Loco de Amor (album) =

Studio album by Juanes
- Released: March 11, 2014
- Label: Universal Music Latino
- Producer: Steve Lillywhite; Juanes

Juanes chronology
Juanes MTV Unplugged (2012)	Loco de Amor (2014)	Tigo Music Sessions (2014)

Singles from Juanes
- 1. "La Luz" Released: December 16, 2013; 2. "Mil Pedazos" Released: March 7, 2014; 3. "Una Flor" Released: June 10, 2014

Loco de Amor (English: Crazy in Love) is the sixth studio album by Colombian recording artist Juanes, released on March 11, 2014, by Universal Music Latino. It is his first studio album since P.A.R.C.E. (2010). At the Latin Grammy Awards of 2014, the album received the award for Best Pop/Rock Album. Loco de Amor was nominated for Lo Nuestro Award for Pop Album of the Year. It was nominated for a Grammy Award for Best Latin Pop Album in 2015.

== Background & release ==
In May 2012, Juanes released a live album titled Juanes: MTV Unplugged, produced by the Dominican musician Juan Luis Guerra. The album featured acoustic version of his hits and received critical acclaim, surpassing the success of his previous studio album, P.A.R.C.E. (2010).

On January 30, Juanes announced the title of the album the social networks with a short message: "My feeling is reflected in three words: Loco de Amor." It was also announced that the record would be released worldwide on March 11, 2014. The cover artwork, featuring Juanes dressed in black looking at the horizon with the sea and mountains in the background at sunset, was revealed on his official website. It was later revealed that a Target-exclusive deluxe version of the record would be made available for pre-order on February 18.

== Singles ==
"La Luz" was released as the lead single from Loco de Amor on December 16, 2013. Its accompanying music video was directed by Jessy Terrero.

"Mil Pedazos" was released as the second single on March 7, 2014, in YouTube.

"Una Flor" was released on June 10, 2014, as the third single from the record.

== Track listing ==
Loco de Amor — Standard edition
No.	Title	Lyrics	Music	Length
1.	"Mil Pedazos"	Juanes; Emmanuel del Real	Juanes	3:11
2.	"Loco de Amor"	Juanes; Raquel Sofía	Juanes	3:20
3.	"La Luz"	Juanes	Juanes	2:57
4.	"La Verdad"	Juanes; Emmanuel del Real	Juanes; Fernando Tobón	3:03
5.	"Una Flor"	Juanes; Fernando Tobón	Juanes	3:47
6.	"Delirio"	Juanes	Juanes	4:11
7.	"Laberinto"	Juanes; Miguel Bosé	Juanes; Steve Wildey	3:24
8.	"Persiguiendo el Sol"	Juanes; Miguel Bosé	Juanes	3:43
9.	"Corazón Invisible"	Juanes; Miguel Bosé	Juanes; Steve Wildey	3:20
10.	"Me Enamoré de Ti"	Juanes; Miguel Bosé	Juanes	4:24
11.	"Radio Elvis"	Juanes	Juanes	3:12

Loco de Amor — Deluxe (bonus tracks)
No.	Title	Length
12.	"Laberinto" ((Steve's Fun Mix))	3:23
13.	"Fenix"	2:53
14.	"La Luz" (Music video)	3:37
15.	"La Luz (Behind The Scenes)"	2:00
16.	"Loco De Amor Studio Sessions"	20:46

Loco de Amor — Brazilian edition
No.	Title	Writer(s)	Producer(s)	Length
12.	"La Luz" (featuring Claudia Leitte)	Juanes; Dan Kambaiah	Juanes	2:57

Loco de Amor — Brazilian deluxe edition
No.	Title	Length
12.	"Laberinto" (Steve’s Fun Mix)	3:23
13.	"Fenix"	2:53
14.	"La Luz" (featuring Claudia Leitte)	2:57

Loco de Amor — Target & Latin American Deluxe Edition
No.	Title	Length
12.	"Balada"	3:21
13.	"Una Flor" (Steve’s Fun Mix)	3:32
14.	"La Luz" (featuring Claudia Leitte)	3:01
15.	"La Luz" (DJ Angustias Remix)

== Charts ==
=== Weekly charts ===
Chart (2014)	Peak position
Argentine Albums (CAPIF)	8
Colombian Albums (ASINCOL)	1
Ecuadorian Albums (IFPI)	1
Greek Albums (IFPI)	24
Mexican Albums (AMPROFON)	3
Spanish Albums (PROMUSICAE)	43
Swiss Albums (Schweizer Hitparade)	75
US Billboard 200	36
US Top Latin Albums (Billboard)	2
US Latin Pop Albums (Billboard)	1

=== Year-end charts ===
Chart (2014)	Position
US Latin Albums	16
US Latin Pop Albums	5

== Certifications and sales ==
Region	Certification	Certified units/sales
Colombia	12× Platinum	240,000
Ecuador	Gold	
Mexico (AMPROFON)	Gold	30,000^{^}
Peru	Gold	
United States	—	22,000
^{^} Shipments figures based on certification alone.

== Release history ==
Country	Date	Version	Format	Label	Ref.
Colombia	March 11, 2014	Standard; Deluxe	CD; Digital download	Universal Music Latino	
Mexico	March 11, 2014	Standard; Deluxe	CD; Digital download	Universal Music Latino	
United States	March 11, 2014	Standard; Deluxe	CD; Digital download	Universal Music Latino	
Brazil	March 11, 2014	Standard; Deluxe	CD; Digital download	Universal Music Latino	Colombia
