= La Señal =

La Señal may refer to:

- La Señal (film), a 2007 film directed by Ricardo Darín and Martín Hodara
- La Señal (song), a 2012 song by Juanes
