= Paula Fernandes =

Brazilian singer-songwriter

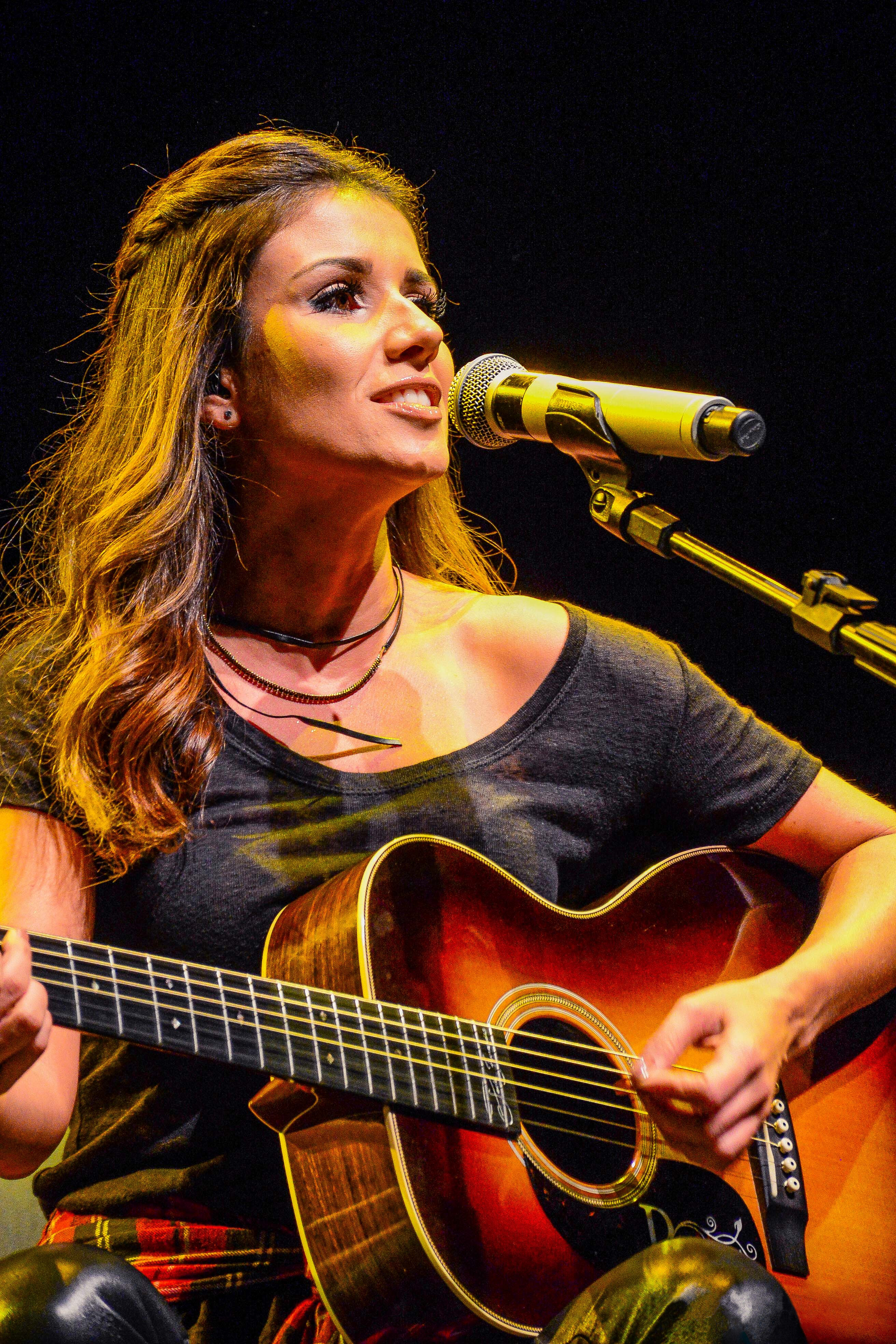
- Fernandes in 2017

Background information
- Birth name: Paula Fernandes de Souza
- Born: August 28, 1984 (age 41)
- Origin: Sete Lagoas, Minas Gerais, Brazil
- Genres: Sertanejo; rock; MPB; country pop
- Occupations: Singer; songwriter
- Instruments: Vocals; guitar
- Years active: 1993–present
- Labels: Universal Music Brazil
- Website: paulafernandes.com.br

Paula Fernandes de Souza (Brazilian Portuguese: [ˈpawlɐ feʁˈnɐ̃dʒis]; born August 28, 1984, in Sete Lagoas, Minas Gerais) is a Brazilian singer-songwriter. She won Latin Grammy Awards for her albums Amanhecer in 2016 and for Origens (Ao Vivo em Sete Lagoas) in 2020.

== Biography ==
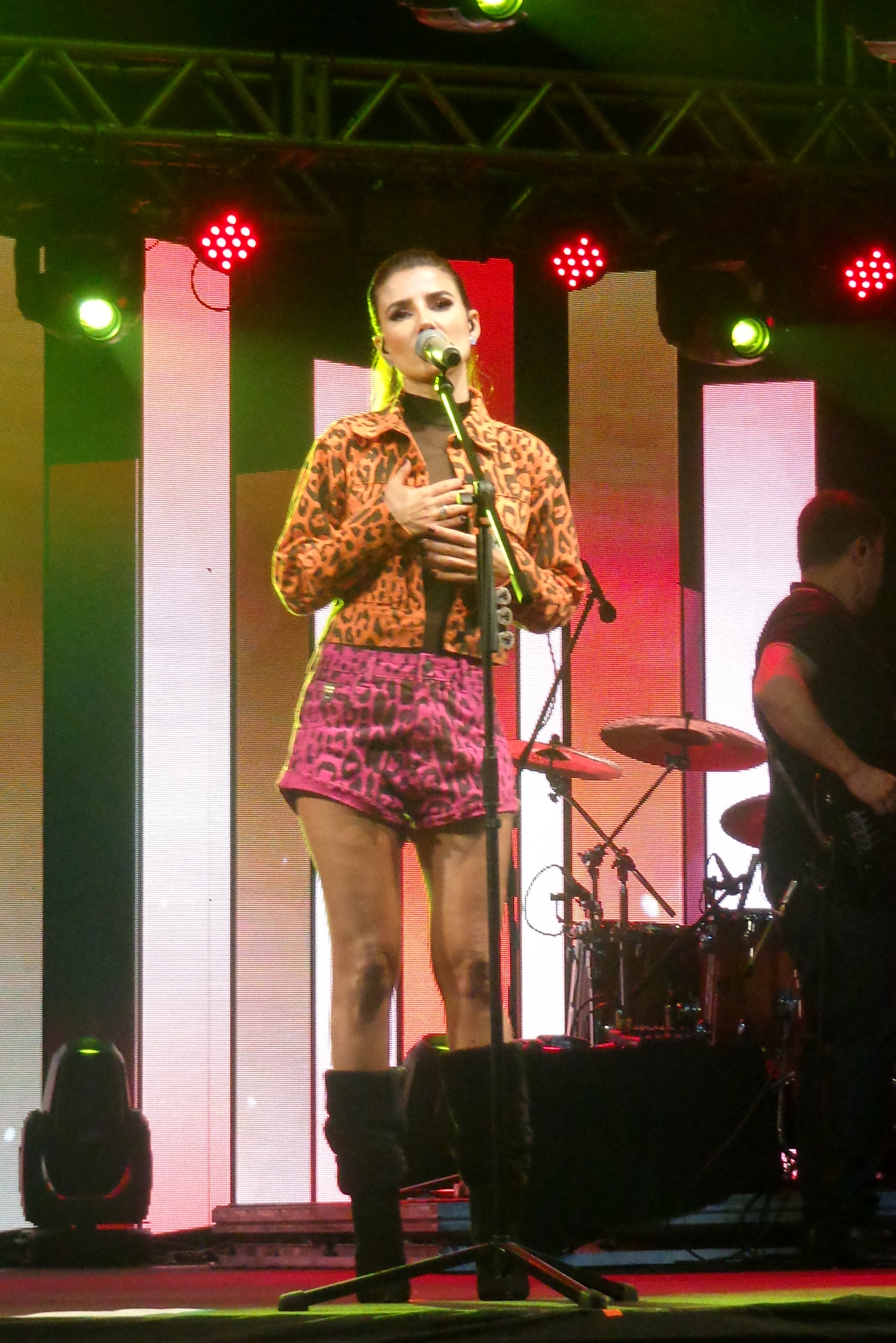
Fernandes performing in 2022

Fernandes was born in Sete Lagoas, Minas Gerais, where she grew up on a farm with her parents and a younger brother. She went to college to study Geography in Belo Horizonte when she was 18 years old.

Fernandes started singing when she was eight years old, and released a self-titled debut album (Paula Fernandes) in 1993. Her second album, Ana Rayo, was released in 1995, inspired by the telenovela A História de Ana Raio e Zé Trovão. In 2005, she recorded "Ave Maria Natureza", one of the theme songs of Rede Globo's telenovela América. She released the album Canções do Vento Sul in 2005, for which she was nominated for the Best Popular Singer Award at the Prêmio da Música Brasileira. In 2007, Fernandes released an album in English titled Dust in the Wind, in an American western style.

The song "Jeito de Mato" from her 2009 album, Pássaro de Fogo, was used as a theme song on the telenovela Paraíso, and her version of Ivete Sangalo's "Quando a Chuva Passar" was the main theme of the telenovela Escrito nas Estrelas. Fernandes released her first DVD in October 2010, and gained further recognition after participating in two Rede Globo specials: the Roberto Carlos' end of year show, broadcast on December 25, 2010, and Show da Virada, broadcast on New Year's Eve, 2010. Her live album, Paula Fernandes – Ao Vivo, released in 2011, was the top seller that year. Fernandes became known across Latin America with her collaboration on the song "Hoy Me Voy", which was released on Juanes' 2012 album MTV Unplugged.

Fernandes' 2013 album Multishow ao Vivo – Um Ser Amor was nominated for the 2014 Latin Grammy Award for Best Sertaneja Music Album, with the title song being nominated in the Best Brazilian Song category. Fernandes' album Hora Certa was nominated for a Latin Grammy Award in 2019, and she won a second Latin Grammy award in 2020 for her album Origens (Ao Vivo em Sete Lagoas), which was recorded live in June 2019.

Fernandes has sung a number of duets, and ensembles, with other artists including Michael Bolton, Zezé Di Camargo & Luciano, Shania Twain and Taylor Swift. Fernandes has toured internationally, performing to more than 500,000 people in Italy, United Kingdom, Switzerland, Brazil, Portugal, United States, Luxembourg, Angola, Cape Verde, Spain, Argentina and Paraguay.

In 2013 Fernandes stated in an interview that she was a follower of Spiritism, leading some Christians to boycott her concerts.

== Discography ==
=== Studio albums ===
Title	Details	Certifications
Canções do Vento Sul	Released: September 14, 2005; Label: Sonhos & Sons; Format: CD, digital download	Gold (ABPD)
Dust in the Wind	Released: February 16, 2007; Label: EMI; Format: CD, digital download	Gold(ABPD)
Pássaro de Fogo	Released: April 18, 2009; Label: Universal Music; Format: CD, digital download	3× Platinum (ABPD)
Meus Encantos	Released: May 29, 2012; Label: Universal; Format: CD, digital download	Diamond (ABPD)
Amanhecer	Released: October 23, 2015; Label: Universal; Format: CD, digital download	Gold (ABPD)
11:11	Released: April 7, 2023; Label: Universal; Format: CD, DVD, digital download	

=== Live albums ===
Title	Details	Certifications
Paula Fernandes: Ao Vivo	Released: January 26, 2011; Label: Universal; Format: CD, DVD, digital download	2× Diamond (ABPD) Platinum (AFP)
Multishow Ao Vivo: Um Ser Amor	Released: October 22, 2013; Label: Universal; Format: CD, DVD, digital download	Diamond (ABPD)
Amanhecer Ao Vivo	Released: September 30, 2016; Label: Universal; Format: CD, DVD, digital download	
Origens (Ao Vivo em Sete Lagoas)	Released: July 26, 2019; Label: Universal; Format: CD, DVD, digital download	

=== EPs ===
Title	Details	Certifications
Um Ser Amor	Released: June 12, 2013; Label: Universal; Format: CD, digital download	Platinum (ABPD)

=== Compilation albums ===
Title	Details	Certifications
As 20 Melhores	Released: April 2, 2013; Label: Universal; Format: Digital download	
Encontros pelo Caminho	Compilation album; Released: September 23, 2014; Label: Universal; Format: CD, DVD, digital download	Platinum (ABPD)
A Arte de Paula Fernandes	Compilation album; Released: October 30, 2015; Label: Universal; Format: CD, digital download	

=== Singles ===
Year	Title	Peak chart positions		Album
Year	Title	Brasil Hot 100 Airplay	Brasil Hot Popular Songs	Album
2005	"Meu Eu em Você"	—	—	Canções do Vento Sul
2009	"Pássaro de Fogo"	36	2	Pássaro de Fogo
2009	"Jeito de Mato"	24	3	Pássaro de Fogo
2010	"Quando a Chuva Passar"	29	20	Pássaro de Fogo
2011	"Pra Você"	2	2	Paula Fernandes: Ao Vivo
2011	"Não Precisa" (duet with Victor & Leo)	2	6	Paula Fernandes: Ao Vivo
2011	"Sensações"	60	—	Paula Fernandes: Ao Vivo
2012	"Eu Sem Você"	2	—	Meus Encantos
2012	"Cuidar Mais de Mim"	13	—	Meus Encantos
2013	"Se o Coração Viajar"	16	—	Meus Encantos
2013	"Um Ser Amor"	4	—	Um Ser Amor (EP)
2013	"Não Fui Eu"	3	—	Multishow Ao Vivo: Um Ser Amor
2014	"Quem É"	14	—	Multishow Ao Vivo: Um Ser Amor
2014	"You're Still the One" (duet with Shania Twain)	15	—	Encontros pelo Caminho
2015	"Pegando Lágrimas" (duet with Chitãozinho & Xororó)	17	—	Encontros pelo Caminho
2015	"Depois" (duet with Victor & Leo)	29	—	Encontros pelo Caminho
2015	"A Paz Desse Amor"	21	—	Amanhecer
2016	"Piração"	4	—	Amanhecer
2016	"Depende da Gente"	13	—	Amanhecer
2016	"Olhos de Céu"	88	—	Amanhecer Ao Vivo
2017	"Traidor"	51	—	Hora Certa
2018	"Beijo Bom"	32	—	Hora Certa
2019	"Juntos"	26	—	Origens
2022	"Rebelde" (duet with Moderatto)	—	—	Rockea Bien Duro
2022	"Tá Tudo Bem" (duet Israel e Rodolffo)	15	—	11:11
2022	"Bloqueia Meu Zap"	40		11:11
2022	"Prioridades" (duet Lauana Prado)	30		11:11
2023	"FDP" (duet Tierry)	25		11:11
2023	"Tá De Mal Comigo"			11:11
2023	"Ciúmes Demais"			11:11
As featured artist
2010	"Caminhoneiro" (duet with Dominguinhos)	—	—	Emoções Sertanejas
2011	"Meu Grito de Amor" (duet with Eduardo Costa)	8	—	De Pele, Alma e Coração Ao Vivo
2011	"Over the Rainbow" (duet with Michael Bolton)	—	28	Gems: The Duets Collection
2012	"Long Live" (duet with Taylor Swift)	10	—	Speak Now World Tour – Live (Brazilian edition)
2012	"Hoy Me Voy" (duet with Juanes)	54	—	Juanes MTV Unplugged
2012	"Criação Divina" (duet with Zezé Di Camargo & Luciano)	6	—	20 Anos de Sucesso
2013	"Se Tudo Fosse Fácil" (duet with Michel Teló)	6	—	Sunset

== Awards and nominations ==
=== Latin Grammy Award ===
Year	Category	Nominated work	Result
2011	Best New Artist	Paula Fernandes	Nominated
2011	Best Sertaneja Music Album	Ao Vivo	Nominated
2012	Best Sertaneja Music Album	Meus Encantos	Nominated
2014	Best Sertaneja Music Album	Multishow Ao Vivo – Um Ser Amor	Nominated
2014	Best Brazilian Song	"Um Ser Amor"	Nominated
2016	Best Sertaneja Music Album	Amanhecer	Won
2019	Best Sertaneja Music Album	Hora Certa	Nominated
2020	Best Sertaneja Music Album	Origens (Ao Vivo em Sete Lagoas)	Won
