= La Luz (Juanes song) =

Single by Juanes

from the album Loco de Amor
- Released: December 16, 2013
- Genre: Latin pop
- Length: 2:58
- Label: Universal Music Latino
- Songwriter: Juanes
- Producer: Steve Lillywhite

Juanes singles chronology
"La Flaca" (2013)	"La Luz" (2013)	"Mil Pedazos" (2014)

"La Luz" (English: The Light) is a song written and performed by the Colombian singer-songwriter Juanes, released as the lead single from his sixth studio album Loco de Amor (2014) on December 16, 2013. The song was produced by the American producer Steve Lillywhite. The music video for the song was directed by Jessy Terrero and filmed in Cartagena. An alternate version of the song featuring Brazilian singer Claudia Leitte was also released.

== Background ==
"La Luz"

After the success for his second live album, MTV Unplugged (2012), the singer decided get back to the studio. At the Grammy Awards of 2013, Juanes presented and performed totally in English, singing "Your Song" of Elton John, being the first time watch Juanes singing a song in other language. This presentation caught the attention for many fans and journalist, about the possibility for record his next studio album in English. On November in the same year, Juanes with Carlos Santana presented the category of Album of the Year at the Latin Grammy Awards of 2013, they performed "La Flaca", original song for the Spanish rock band Jarabe de Palo, four days later released the song as the first single from the twenty-third studio album of Santana. On December 11, Juanes uploaded a video via Facebook, talking about of the new single from his upcoming album. Then in Twitter, showed the official cover for "La Luz" (The Light) and the date that will be released. The lead single, "La Luz" was released on December 16, 2013, from his sixth studio album Loco De Amor.

== Critical reception ==
Following its release, "La Luz" received some reviews from music critics. Thom Jurek of Allmusic, said that the song "melds 21st century EDM" with the "Colombian cumbia and Latin alt-rock", in a driving with "infectious dancefloor groover", and praised the vocal performance from Juanes, when he refers about his "killer falsetto". Hector Aviles of Latin Music Café, compared the song with "Yerbatero", said that have a similar in the "fast beat and high energy with simplistic lyrics". Aviles added that the song mixes the electronica with Colombian folk, within a pop-rock style, also said that is innovative but musicality doesn't offer much.

== Chart performance ==
"La Luz", debuted in Colombia at number three on the National-Report chart on the week of December 16, 2013. Two weeks later, it peaked at number one on the chart replacing "Amor a Primera Vista" by Alkilados. It spent three consecutive weeks on top of the chart until it was replaced by Prince Royce's single, "Darte un Beso". In the United States, the song debuted at number 27 on the Billboard Latin Pop Songs chart and received the "Greatest Gainer", in Billboard Tropical Airplay chart at number 39.

In Mexico, debuted on the Monitor Latino chart at number 11, and two weeks later, peaked at number 4 in the week ending February 17, 2014. It also peaked at number twelve on the Billboard Mexican Airplay chart. While in Venezuela debuted at number 37, and twelve weeks later top the chart. It peaked at number forty-one in Spain.

== Music video ==
In October 30, Juanes posted a photo on Instagram where was shooting his new music video, causing curiosity from the fans, and the rumors about the coming of a new single. Three days later Juanes upload the music video of "La Luz" in December 18, in his VEVO account, receiving 400k views the first day. The music video was shot in the streets of the center of Cartagena, was directed by Jessy Terrero.

== Live performances ==
The song was performed live for the first time in Antofagasta, Chile as part of the VI Festival de Antofagasta 2014, in the Valentine's Day. On March 11, 2014, the same day of the releasing of Loco de Amor, Juanes performed "La Luz" at The Tonight Show Starring Jimmy Fallon. The next day, Juanes performed the song in a concert in Miami, as part of a show that was broadcast live online for Terra Live Music.

== Track listing ==
- Digital download
1. "La Luz" - 2:57
2. "La Luz" (featuring Claudia Leitte) - 3:02

== Credits and personnel ==
Recording

- Recorded at Henson Recording Studios, Hollywood, California and Perfect Sound Studios, Los Angeles, California.

Personnel

- Songwriting – Juanes
- Production – Juanes, Steve Lillywhite
- Vocal engineering and recording – Matty Green
- Mixing – Steve Lillywhite, Matty Green
- Background vocals;– Michele Delamor, Ana Cristina Álvarez

Credits adapted from the liner notes of Loco de Amor, Universal Music Latino, Parce Music LLC (BMI).

== Charts ==
=== Weekly charts ===
Chart (2013)	Peak position
Colombia (National-Report)	1
Mexico (Billboard Mexican Airplay)	12
Mexico (Monitor Latino)	4
Spain (PROMUSICAE)	41
US Hot Latin Songs (Billboard)	11
US Latin Airplay (Billboard)	1
US Tropical Airplay (Billboard)	4
Venezuela (Record Report)	1

=== Year-end charts ===
Chart (2014)	Position
US Latin Songs	90
US Latin Pop Songs	23
US Latin Tropical Airplay	40

== Release history ==
Country	Date	Format	Label
Colombia	December 16, 2013	Digital download	Universal Music
Mexico	December 16, 2013	Digital download	Universal Music
United States	December 16, 2013	Digital download	Universal Music
Austria	December 17, 2013	Digital download	Universal Music
Belgium	December 17, 2013	Digital download	Universal Music
France	December 17, 2013	Digital download	Universal Music
Italy	December 17, 2013	Digital download	Universal Music
Netherlands	December 17, 2013	Digital download	Universal Music
Portugal	December 17, 2013	Digital download	Universal Music
Spain	December 17, 2013	Digital download	Universal Music
Switzerland	December 17, 2013	Digital download	Universal Music

== See also ==
- List of number-one songs of 2014 in Colombia
- List of Billboard number-one Latin songs of 2014
