= List of number-one songs of 2014 (Colombia) =

This is a list of the National-Report Top 100 Nacional number-one songs of 2014. Chart rankings are based on radio play and are issued weekly. The data is compiled monitoring radio stations through an automated system in real-time.

== Number ones be week ==
Key
†	Song of the year

Week	Issue date	Song	Artist(s)	Ref.
1	December 30	"La Foto de los Dos"	Carlos Vives	
2	January 6	"Amor a Primera Vista"	Alkilados	
3	January 13	"Amor a Primera Vista"	Alkilados	
4	January 20	"La Luz"	Juanes	
5	January 27	"La Luz"	Juanes	
6	February 3	"La Luz"	Juanes	
7	February 10	"Darte un Beso"	Prince Royce	
8	February 17	"El Serrucho"	Mr Black	
9	February 24	"El Serrucho"	Mr Black	
10	March 3	"El Mar de Sus Ojos"	Carlos Vives featuring ChocQuibTown	
11	March 10	"El Mar de Sus Ojos"	Carlos Vives featuring ChocQuibTown	
12	March 11	"El Mar de Sus Ojos"	Carlos Vives featuring ChocQuibTown	
13	March 24	"El Mar de Sus Ojos"	Carlos Vives featuring ChocQuibTown	
14	March 31	"El Mar de Sus Ojos"	Carlos Vives featuring ChocQuibTown	
15	April 7	"El Mar de Sus Ojos"	Carlos Vives featuring ChocQuibTown	
16	April 14	"El Mar de Sus Ojos"	Carlos Vives featuring ChocQuibTown	
17	April 21	"El Mar de Sus Ojos"	Carlos Vives featuring ChocQuibTown	
18	April 28	"El Mar de Sus Ojos"	Carlos Vives featuring ChocQuibTown	
19	May 5	"El Mar de Sus Ojos"	Carlos Vives featuring ChocQuibTown	
20	May 12	"El Mar de Sus Ojos"	Carlos Vives featuring ChocQuibTown	
21	May 16	"Travesuras"	Nicky Jam	
22	May 26	"Travesuras"	Nicky Jam	
23	June 2	"Bailando"	Enrique Iglesias featuring Gente de Zona & Descemer Bueno	
24	June 9	"Bailando"	Enrique Iglesias featuring Gente de Zona & Descemer Bueno	
25	June 16	"Bailando"	Enrique Iglesias featuring Gente de Zona & Descemer Bueno	
26	June 23	"Bailando"	Enrique Iglesias featuring Gente de Zona & Descemer Bueno	
27	June 30	"Bailando"	Enrique Iglesias featuring Gente de Zona & Descemer Bueno	
28	July 7	"Bailando"	Enrique Iglesias featuring Gente de Zona & Descemer Bueno	
29	July 14	"Bailando"	Enrique Iglesias featuring Gente de Zona & Descemer Bueno	
30	July 21	"Bailando"	Enrique Iglesias featuring Gente de Zona & Descemer Bueno	
31	July 28	"Cuando Nos Volvamos a Encontrar"	Carlos Vives featuring Marc Anthony	
32	August 4	"Bailando"	Enrique Iglesias featuring Gente de Zona & Descemer Bueno	
33	August 11	"Cuando Nos Volvamos a Encontrar"	Carlos Vives featuring Marc Anthony	
34	August 28	"Cuando Nos Volvamos a Encontrar"	Carlos Vives featuring Marc Anthony	
35	August 25	"Cuando Nos Volvamos a Encontrar"	Carlos Vives featuring Marc Anthony	
36	September 1	"Cuando Nos Volvamos a Encontrar"	Carlos Vives featuring Marc Anthony	
37	September 8	"Cuando Nos Volvamos a Encontrar"	Carlos Vives featuring Marc Anthony	
38	September 15	"Bailando"	Enrique Iglesias featuring Gente de Zona & Descemer Bueno	
39	September 22	"Una Cita"	Alkilados	
40	September 29	"Una Cita"	Alkilados	
42	October 13	"Una Cita"	Alkilados	
43	October 20	"Ay Vamos"	J Balvin	
44	October 27	"Ay Vamos"	J Balvin	
45	November 3	"Ay Vamos"	J Balvin	
46	November 10	"Ay Vamos"	J Balvin	
47	November 17	"Ay Vamos"	J Balvin	
48	November 24	"Ella Es Mi Fiesta"	Carlos Vives	
49	December 1	"Ella Es Mi Fiesta"	Carlos Vives	
50	December 8	"Ay Vamos"	J Balvin	
51	December 15	"Ella Es Mi Fiesta"	Carlos Vives	
52	December 22	"Ella Es Mi Fiesta"	Carlos Vives	
