= Fotografía (Juanes and Nelly Furtado song) =

Single by Juanes and Nelly Furtado

from the album Un Día Normal
- Language: Spanish
- Released: 28 April 2003
- Recorded: December 2001 – February 2002
- Studio: Larrabee East; La Casa Studios; (Los Angeles, California)
- Genre: Rock
- Length: 3:58
- Label: Universal Music Latino
- Songwriter: Juanes
- Producers: Juanes; Gustavo Santaolalla

Juanes singles chronology
"Mala Gente" (2003)	"Fotografía" (2003)	"La Paga" (2003)

Nelly Furtado singles chronology
"Ching Ching" (2002)	"Fotografía" (2003)	"Powerless (Say What You Want)" (2003)

"Fotografía" (English: "Photograph") is a song recorded by Juanes and Nelly Furtado for Juanes' second studio album, Un Día Normal (2002).

The duet, which was followed by another ("Te Busqué" on Furtado's 2006 studio album, Loose), was commercially successful: it reached number one on the U.S. Billboard Hot Latin Tracks chart.

In 2012, Juanes recorded a new duet with Emanuela Bellezza for inclusion on the deluxe edition of his album Juanes MTV Unplugged.

== Remixes ==
- "Fotografia" (Hessler's remix)
- "Fotografia" (Hessler's radio remix)
- "Fotografia" (DJ Enzo remix)
- "Fotografia" (Gianina mix)
- "Fotografia" (Base mix)
- "Fotografia" (ON remix)

== Other versions ==
- "Fotografia" (instrumental version)

== Chart performance ==
Chart (2003)	Peak position
Mexico (Monitor Latino)	2
US Bubbling Under Hot 100 (Billboard)	16
US Hot Latin Songs (Billboard)	1
US Latin Pop Airplay (Billboard)	1

== Certifications ==
Region	Certification	Certified units/sales
United States (RIAA)	6× Platinum (Latin)	360,000^{‡}
^{‡} Sales+streaming figures based on certification alone.
