= Un Día Normal (song) =

Song by Juanes

Single by Juanes

from the album Un Día Normal
- Released: August 10, 2002
- Genre: Latin pop; rock en español
- Length: 3:42
- Label: Universal; Surco
- Songwriter: Juanes

Juanes singles chronology
"Es Por Ti" (2002)	"Un Día Normal" (2002)	"Nada Valgo Sin Tu Amor" (2004)

"Un Día Normal" (English: "A Normal Day") is a song the Colombian singer-songwriter Juanes belonging to his second studio album Un Día Normal in 2002. The song quickly became a resounding success Redeemer Radio in Colombia, Chile, Mexico, United States Argentina, Puerto Rico and Venezuela, Cuba, France, Germany, Switzerland, Germany, Netherlands, Ecuador and other America and Europe.

The song is about love and clarity and this is reflected fully the objective of the Juanes album because this album attempts to understand the importance of love and it is said that some of the songs on this album were composed especially for his wife actress and model Karen Martínez. This song was released the album's success and contribution to music in Spanish.

== Track listing ==
1. "Un Día Normal" – 3:42 (Juanes)

== Chart performance ==
Chart (2004)	Peak position
US Hot Latin Songs (Billboard)	44
US Latin Pop Airplay (Billboard)	24
