= 11:11 (Paula Fernandes album) =

Studio album by Paula Fernandes
- Released: 7 April 2023
- Recorded: March 2022
- Genre: Sertanejo; country pop
- Length: 46:13
- Language: Portuguese
- Label: Universal Music Brazil
- Director: Júlio Loureiro
- Producer: Ricardo Lopes

Paula Fernandes chronology
Origens (2019)	11:11 (2023)

Singles from 11:11
- 1. "Tá Tudo Bem" Released: 22 September 2022; 2. "Bloqueia Meu Zap" Released: 6 October 2022; 3. "Prioridades" Released: 11 November 2022; 4. "FDP*" Released: 12 January 2023; 5. "Tá de Mal Comigo" Released: 20 January 2023; 6. "Ciúmes Demais" Released: 26 January 2023

11:11 is the sixth studio album by Brazilian singer-songwriter Paula Fernandes. Released on 7 April 2023, by Universal Music Brazil. The project features musical production by Ricardo Lopes and audiovisual direction by Júlio Loureiro. The project has three participations, from the singer Tierry, from the singer Lauana Prado and also from the sertaneja duo Israel & Rodolffo. The album won an acoustic version and its release was divided into three parts, generating six singles and three promotional singles.

== Recording ==
The project recordings took place at a horse farm in the interior of São Paulo in March 2022, in four days of recordings, in addition to recording the songs, a documentary and musical meetings were recorded.

== Release and promotion ==
=== Singles ===
"Tá Tudo Bem" in partnership with the duo Israel & Rodolffo was chosen as the work track of the comeback. The song was released to radio on 3 October as the album's lead single, debuting at number 15. The second single "Bloqueia Meu Zap" was released on 6 October 2022, accompanied by an official music video. On 1 November, an acoustic version of the single was released.

The track "Prioridades" in partnership with Lauana Prado was chosen as the third single to be released on 11 November; referring to the title of the audiovisual project. The song won an acoustic version on 16 December 2022, and already has 200,000 views on YouTube. The fourth single to be released as the project's working track; "FDP" was released on 12 January 2023; featuring singer Tierry. "Tá De Mal Comigo" was released on 20 January 2023, accompanied by the official music video.

The sixth single taken from the project; "Ciúmes Demais" is a country pop song, released on 26 January 2023.

=== Marketing ===
The album was presented on the program Encontro com Patrícia Poeta on 22 September 2022 and on the program Faustão na Band on 3 October 2022.

=== Tour ===
On 22 October 2022, the tour was officially launched at Tokio Marine Hall in São Paulo.

== Track listing ==
11:11 track listing
No.	Title	Writer(s)	Length
1.	"Tá Tudo Bem" (with Israel & Rodolffo)	Fernandes; Juan Marcus	3:11
2.	"Antigo Novo Amor"	Fernandes; Luigi Visacre; Gabriel Rocha; Jonathan Felix	3:10
3.	"Bloqueia Meu Zap"	Fernandes; Waléria Leão; Marcus; Hiago Vinícius	2:18
4.	"Flor"	Fernandes; Elías Inácio; Gustavo Fagundes	3:14
5.	"Gasolina"	Jullie; Bernardo Martins	3:07
6.	"Prioridades" (with Lauana Prado)	Juan Marcus; Fabrício Fafá; Renato Campero; Rick Monteiro; Vinícius	2:26
7.	"Mil Carinhos"	Elias Mafra; Gabriel Rocha	3:13
8.	"Bye Bye e Recaí"	Fernandes; Waléria Leão; Juan Marcus; Hiago Vinícius; Vinícius Leão	2:12
9.	"Dois Enredos"	Gustavo Fagundes; Léo Pinheiro; Lucas Abude	3:18
10.	"FDP" (with Tierry)	Tierry	2:46
11.	"Tá de Mal Comigo"	Elias Mafra; Gabriel Rocha; Fernandes	2:55
12.	"Ciúmes Demais"	Diego Ferrari; Everton Matos; Guilherme Ferraz; Léo Sagga; Paulo Pires; Ray Antônio	2:50
13.	"Me Leva"	Fernandes	2:50
14.	"No Mesmo Olhar" (with Lauana Prado)	Jimmy Butterfly; Michael Utley; Will Jennings	2:52
15.	"Nascemos pra Cantar" (with Israel & Rodolffo)	Danny Moore	2:43
16.	"Lembranças de um Beijo" (with Tierry)	Aciolly Neto	3:00
Total length:			46:13

== Release history ==
Release dates and formats for 11:11
Region	Date	Format	Label	Ref.
Various	7 April 2023	digital download; streaming	Universal Music Brazil	
