= Nada (Juanes song) =

2000 song by Juanes

Single by Juanes

from the album Fíjate Bien
- Released: 12 February 2001
- Recorded: 2000
- Genre: Latin pop
- Length: 3:56 (album version)
- Label: Universal Music Latino
- Songwriter: Juanes
- Producer: Gustavo Santaolalla

Juanes singles chronology
"Podemos Hacernos Daño" (2000)	"Nada" (2001)	"A Dios le Pido" (2002)

"Nada" (English: "Nothing") is a song by Colombian singer Juanes, belonging to his debut solo album, Fíjate Bien. The single went on sale in 2001. This song established Juanes as a million-selling artist.

== Reception ==
The song was well received in European and Latin American countries. The theme of the song is the life of an unfortunate person while in love. With this song, the album, Fíjate Bien had high sales in Hispanic countries, selling over one million copies worldwide, making it one of the best selling Spanish debut albums in the history of music.

== Chart positions ==
The song arrived at No. 1 in several countries in Latin America and Europe; it was in the top 40 Colombia, Mexico, and Spain, and quickly topped the charts. In Chile, the song on its first day reached position No. 5 and the next week debuted at No. 1, this example was followed by several South American countries.

== Music video ==
In the music video, Juanes is a convict awaiting his execution by electric chair. Various people pace around in the room with him, including a priest and a policeman, watching the clock impatiently while yelling in Juanes's ear. A woman and two children watch the execution from a window in a room above. When the clock strikes twelve, the executioner, who is shown as Juanes for a moment, throws the switch. A sign flashes "applause". After the execution is over, Juanes walks into the room with the woman and children.

== Charts ==
Chart (2000)	Peak position
US Hot Latin Songs (Billboard)	18
US Latin Pop Airplay (Billboard)	10
