= Fíjate Bien =

Studio album by Juanes
- Released: October 17, 2000
- Recorded: October 1999 – March 2000
- Studio: La Casa Studio (Los Angeles, California)
- Genre: Rock en español
- Length: 47:46
- Label: Surco
- Producer: Gustavo Santaolalla

Juanes chronology
Fíjate Bien (2000)	Un Día Normal (2002)

Singles from Fíjate Bien
- 1. "Fíjate Bien" Released: August 7, 2000; 2. "Podemos Hacernos Daño" Released: November 13, 2000; 3. "Nada" Released: February 12, 2001

Professional ratings
Review scores
Source	Rating
Allmusic	3.5/5 stars

Fíjate Bien (Spanish for Pay Attention) is the debut studio album recorded by Colombian singer-songwriter Juanes, It was released by Surco Records on October 17, 2000 (see 2000 in music). The album was produced by Gustavo Santaolalla, who is known for his contributions to Latin rock tracks. All the songs on the album were written by Juanes himself. The strings were arranged, orchestrated and conducted by David Campbell, who has also worked on several other albums by Juanes. The album received six Latin Grammy Award nominations in 2001 including Album of the Year, Record of the Year and Song of the Year, Best Short Form Music Video for Fijate Bien; Best Rock Solo Vocal Album and Best New Artist winning the later two.

The album was certified Disco de Platino by the RIAA on June 23, 2003, for shipping 100,000 copies.

== Track listing ==
1. "Ahí le Va" (There It Goes) – 3:27
2. "Para Ser Eterno" (To Be Eternal) – 5:04
3. "Volcán" (Volcano) – 3:33
4. "Podemos Hacernos Daño" (We Could Hurt Each Other) – 3:46
5. "Destino" (Destiny) – 3:33
6. "Nada" (Nothing) – 3:53
7. "Fíjate Bien" (Focus) – 4:55
8. "Vulnerable" (Vulnerable) – 4:27
9. "Soñador" (Dreamer) – 3:25
10. "Ficcion" (Fiction) – 4:14
11. "¿Para Qué?" (What For?) – 3:35
12. "Me da Igual" (I Don't Mind) – 4:12

== Videoclips ==
1. "Podemos Hacernos Daño"
2. "Nada"
3. "Fíjate Bien"

== Bonus tracks edition ==
1. "De Madrugada" (In the Dawn) – 3:50
2. "Sin Rencores" (Without Resentment) – 3:03
3. "Solo" (Alone) – 4:56
4. "Raza" (Race) – 3:15
5. "La Decision" (The Decision) – 5:33
6. "La Tierra" (The Land) – 3:48

== Charts ==
Weekly chart performance for Fíjate Bien
Chart (2001)	Peak position
US Top Latin Albums (Billboard)	36
US Latin Pop Albums (Billboard)	15

== Certifications ==
Certifications for Fíjate Bien
Region	Certification	Certified units/sales
Colombia	—	20,000
Spain	—	260,000
United States (RIAA)	Platinum (Latin)	100,000^{^}
^{^} Shipments figures based on certification alone.
