= La Paga =

Single by Juanes featuring will.i.am and Taboo

from the album Un Día Normal and Elephunk (Latin version)
- Released: 5 October 2003
- Recorded: 2002
- Genre: Latin pop
- Length: 3:33
- Label: Universal Music Latino
- Songwriter: Juanes

Juanes singles chronology
"Fotografía" (2003)	"La Paga" (2003)	"Un Dia Normal" (2004)

will.i.am singles chronology
"La Paga" (2003)	"Beep" (2005)

"La Paga" (The Pay) is a song written and performed by Colombian singer-songwriter Juanes. It's the fifth of six radio singles from his second solo studio album, Un Día Normal. "La Paga" can also be found on the compilation album 2005 Año de Exitos, which also features hit singles by Paulina Rubio, Luis Fonsi, and David Bisbal, among many other artists. The remix features rapper Taboo and occasionally will.i.am, both from The Black Eyed Peas. The remix can be found on The Black Eyed Peas album Elephunk bonus track version, and Juanes albums, Mi Sangre (2005 tour edition), Mi Sangre (2005 double disc version), and Mi Sangre (European tour edition). "La Paga" contains a sample of Buena Vista Social Club's "Candela".

== Track listing ==
1. "La Paga" (radio edit) – 3:33 (Juan Esteban Aristizabal)

== Music video ==
The music video is animated and directed by Jason Archer and Paul Beck. It features an anthropomorphic mouse in a human world. In the story of the video, the mouse finds that his human girlfriend is having an affair with another mouse. He goes to the bar, drinks a lot, goes to his car and crashes in the highway with a sign. At the end, he wakes up where he sees a female doctor, and the TV behind her shows his girlfriend.

== Chart performance ==
Chart (2003–2005)	Peak position
Belgium (Ultratip Bubbling Under Flanders)	3
Belgium (Ultratip Bubbling Under Wallonia)	8
CIS Airplay (TopHit)	117
Germany (GfK)	91
Hungary (Dance Top 40)	39
Switzerland (Schweizer Hitparade)	29
US Hot Latin Songs (Billboard)	5
US Latin Pop Airplay (Billboard)	3
