= Un Día Normal =

Studio album by Juanes
- Released: 21 May 2002
- Recorded: December 2001 – February 2002
- Studios: Larabee East; La Casa Studios (Los Angeles, California)
- Genres: Latin rock; alternative rock
- Length: 42:44
- Label: Surco
- Producers: Juanes; Aníbal Kerpel; Gustavo Santaolalla; Melissa Mattey

Juanes chronology
Fíjate Bien (2000)	Un Día Normal (2002)	Mi Sangre (2004)

Singles from Un Día Normal
- 1. "A Dios le Pido" Released: 25 March 2002; 2. "Es Por Tí" Released: 23 September 2002; 3. "Mala Gente" Released: 6 January 2003; 4. "Fotografía" Released: 28 April 2003; 5. "La Paga" Released: 4 August 2003; 6. "Un Día Normal" Released: 8 December 2003

Professional ratings
Review scores
Source	Rating
Allmusic	4/5 stars

Un Día Normal (English: A Normal Day) is the second studio album recorded by Colombian singer-songwriter Juanes, It was released by Surco Records on 21 May 2002. The album was remastered in 2022 for its 20th anniversary.

== Album information ==
The album was highly successful in Latin America. It was certified gold in Colombia during its first day of sales and was certified platinum and multi-platinum in countries including Colombia, United States, Spain and Mexico. The album spent 92 weeks in the top ten of Billboard's Top Latin Albums chart, setting a new record and spent a total of two years on the chart.

The album also features "Fotografía" ("Photograph"), a duet with the Canadian pop singer Nelly Furtado about the isolation between lovers. All songs on the album were self-written by Juanes, except for the last song, "La Noche" ("The Night"), which was written by Joe Arroyo.

The album won six Latin Grammy Awards, one in 2002 for Best Rock Song ("A Dios le Pido") and five in 2003 for Album of the Year, Best Rock Solo Album, Song of the Year ("Es Por Tí"), Record of the Year ("Es Por Ti") and Best Rock Song ("Mala Gente").

== Track listing ==
No.	Title	Length
1.	"A Dios le Pido"	3:26
2.	"Es Por Tí"	4:11
3.	"Un Día Normal"	3:44
4.	"La Paga"	3:21
5.	"La Única"	3:02
6.	"Luna"	3:30
7.	"Día Lejano"	3:33
8.	"Mala Gente"	3:16
9.	"Fotografía" (with Nelly Furtado)	3:58
10.	"Desde que Despierto Hasta que Duermo"	3:50
11.	"La Historia de Juan"	3:37
12.	"La Noche"	2:58
Total length:		42:44

== Videoclips ==
1. A Dios le Pido
2. Es por Tí
3. La Paga
4. Fotografía
5. Mala Gente

== Charts ==
Weekly chart performance for Un Día Normal
Chart (2002–04)	Peak position
Belgian Albums (Ultratop Wallonia)	91
Dominican Republic Albums (Musicala)	1
Dutch Albums (Album Top 100)	28
Portuguese Albums (AFP)	2
Swiss Albums (Schweizer Hitparade)	80
Spanish Albums (Promusicae)	37
US Billboard 200	110
US Top Latin Albums (Billboard)	1
US Latin Pop Albums (Billboard)	1
Uruguayan Albums (CUD)	3

== Certifications and sales ==
Certifications and sales for Un Día Normal
Region	Certification	Certified units/sales
Argentina (CAPIF)	Platinum	40,000^{^}
Chile	Gold	
Colombia	3× Platinum	
Ecuador	—	5,000
Mexico (AMPROFON)	2× Platinum+Gold	375,000^{‡}
Portugal (AFP)	Gold	20,000^{^}
Spain (Promusicae)	2× Platinum	200,000^{^}
United States (RIAA)	18× Platinum (Latin)	745,000
Venezuela	Gold	
^{^} Shipments figures based on certification alone.^{‡} Sales+streaming figures based on certification alone.

== Singles ==
Name	Released	Writer	Producer	Chart position
"A Dios le Pido"	25 March 2002; April 2006	Juanes	Juanes, Gustavo Santaolalla	#1 (ARG/US Latin Pop/US Latin Tropical), No. 2 (US Hot Latin), No. 5 (ROM/RUS), No. 6 (Spain/EU Airplay), No. 7 (SLOV/SWI), No. 9 (GRE), No. 11 (UKR), No. 12 (FRA), No. 18 (NLD), No. 19 (AUT), No. 20 (BEL-Wall), No. 22 (Czech Republic), No. 23 (EST), No. 31 (GER), No. 33 (BEL-Flan), No. 41 (EU)
"A Dios le Pido" ("I Ask God") is the first single from Un Día Normal. It was primarily released in 2002 in Spain and Latin America. In 2006, the song was re-released in some countries in Europe due to the success of "La Camisa Negra", which peaked in almost every European country in the top five.
"Es Por Ti"	23 September 2002	Juanes		#1 (Chile), No. 2 (US Latin Pop), No. 8 (US Hot Latin)
"Es Por Ti" ("Because of you") was released as the second single from the album. It is a romantic mid-tempo song. The song was also a big success in Latin America, but was not released in Europe.
"Mala Gente"	6 January 2003	Juanes	Juanes, Gustavo Santaolalla	#8 (US Latin Pop), No. 12 (US Hot Latin)
"Mala Gente" ("Bad People") is the third single from the album. The song won the award for Best Rock Song in 2003.
"Fotografía"	28 April 2003	Juanes	Gustavo Santaolalla	#1 (US Hot Latin/US Latin Pop), No. 4 (US Latin Tropical)
"Fotografía" ("Photograph") is a song recorded by Juanes and Nelly Furtado for Un Día Normal. The duet was extremely successful in Latin America on the Latin Charts in the US; it reached number one on the U.S. Billboard Hot Latin Tracks chart. The song became his third number one hit in Argentina and second one in Chile.
"La Paga"	4 August 2003	Juanes	Gustavo Santaolalla, will.i.am	#2 (World Latin Singles), No. 3 (US Latin Pop/US Latin Tropical), No. 5 (US Hot Latin), No. 29 (Switzerland)
"La Paga" is the fifth single from the album. The single version features Taboo from the popular band The Black Eyed Peas. The song was less successful than the previous singles, because it did not receive promotion like the former singles did. It was the second single released in Europe after "A Dios le pido."
"Un Día Normal"	8 December 2003	Juanes	Gustavo Santaolalla	No. 24 (US Latin Pop), No. 44 (US Hot Latin)
"Un Día Normal" ("A Normal Day") was released as the album's sixth and last single.

== See also ==
- 2002 in Latin music
- List of best-selling Latin albums in the United States
- List of best-selling Latin albums
