= Mala Gente (song) =

Single by Juanes

from the album Un Día Normal
- Released: May 21, 2002
- Recorded: 2002
- Genre: Latin rock
- Length: 3:16
- Label: Universal Music Latino
- Songwriter: Juan Esteban Aristizábal
- Producer: Gustavo Santaolalla

Juanes singles chronology
"Es Por Ti" (2002)	"Mala Gente" (2002)	"Fotografía" (2003)

"Mala Gente" (English: "Evil People") is a Latin rock song by Colombian singer-songwriter Juanes. The song is the third radio single from his second studio album, Un Día Normal. It shows his frustration with his soon-to-be ex-girlfriend who he calls "mala gente" ("evil people" or "evil woman"). She tells him that their romance is now over, and she wants to be friends. He believes her to be a liar, that she cannot be trusted, has played with his emotions and does not want to be friends. That she will come to regret this breakup. His prediction comes true.

This track won the Latin Grammy Award for Best Rock Song at the Latin Grammy Awards of 2003, the third year in a row for him to win in this field.

== Track listing ==
1. "Mala Gente" – 3:16 (Juan Esteban Aristizábal)

== Chart performance ==
Chart (2003)	Peak position
CIS Airplay (TopHit)	84
El Salvador (Notimex)	2
Guatemala (Notimex)	5
US Hot Latin Songs (Billboard)	12
US Latin Pop Airplay (Billboard)	8
