= Una Flor =

Single by Juanes

from the album Loco de Amor
- Released: June 10, 2014
- Genre: Latin pop
- Length: 3:47
- Label: Universal Music Latino
- Songwriters: Juanes; Fernando Tobón

Juanes singles chronology
| "Mil Pedazos" (2014) | "Una Flor" (2014) | "Querida" (2014) |

"Una Flor" ("A Flower") is a song by Colombian singer-songwriter Juanes for his sixth studio album Loco de Amor (2014). The song was released by Universal Music Latino as the third single from the record. It was written by Juanes and his guitarist Fernando Tobón, while production was by Steve Lillywhite and Juanes. "Una Flor" is the official soundtrack for the television serial drama Jane the Virgin.

== Track listing ==
- Album version
1. "Una Flor" – 3:47

== Charts ==
=== Weekly charts ===
| Chart (2014) | Peak position |
|---|---|
| Colombia (National-Report) | 6 |
| Mexico (Billboard Mexican Airplay) | 27 |
| US Hot Latin Songs (Billboard) | 27 |
| US Latin Airplay (Billboard) | 13 |
| US Latin Pop Airplay (Billboard) | 5 |
| US Tropical Airplay (Billboard) | 23 |

=== Year-end charts ===
| Chart (2014) | Position |
|---|---|
| US Latin Songs | 58 |
| US Latin Pop Songs | 19 |
