= La Belleza, Santander =

Coordinates: 5.86139°N 73.9683°W

La Belleza
- Municipality and town
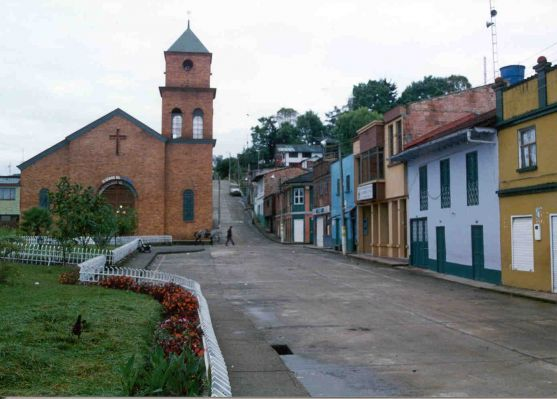

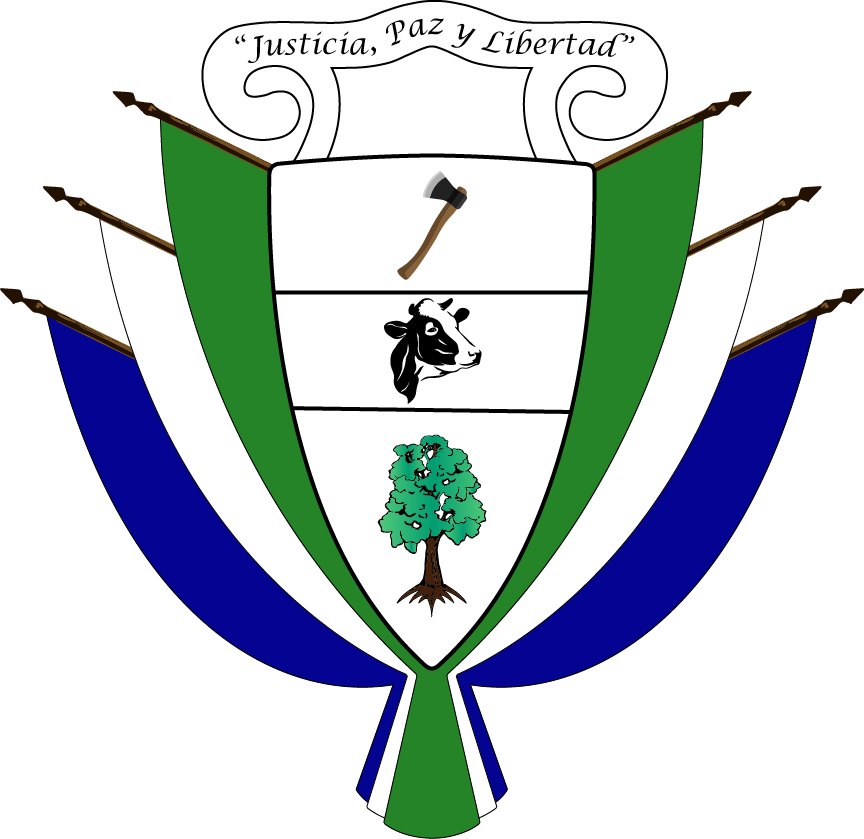
- Flag Coat of arms

- Location of the municipality and town of La Belleza in the Santander Department of Colombia.
- Country: Colombia
- Department: Santander Department
- Time zone: UTC-5 (Colombia Standard Time)

La Belleza is a town and municipality in the Santander Department in northeastern Colombia.
