= La Señal (song) =

Single by Juanes

from the album MTV Unplugged
- Released: March 5, 2012
- Recorded: 2012
- Genre: Latin rock; Alternative rock
- Length: 3:30
- Label: Universal
- Songwriters: Juan Esteban Aristizábal; Juan Luis Guerra
- Producer: Juan Luis Guerra

Juanes singles chronology
"Regalito" (2011)	"La Señal" (2012)	"Hoy Me Voy" (2012)

"La Señal" (English: The Signal) is a song written and performed by Colombian singer Juanes, as part of his second live album Juanes MTV Unplugged (2012). The single was released worldwide as lead single of the album on March 5, 2012, in all radio stations and through iTunes. The song was produced by singer Juan Luis Guerra. "La Señal" is a Latin rock-pop, and the lyrics show us the importance of loving, is the family, the couples or the friends. And tick the love as motor of live and as the signal that Juanes wants to give in this song. The track was nominated for Rock/Alternative Song of the Year at the Premio Lo Nuestro 2013.

== Music video ==
The video for the song was recorded in Miami Beach on February 2, 2012. The music video is now available in all channels worldwide audience, including YouTube.

== Charts ==
=== Weekly charts ===
Chart (2012)	Peak position
Belgium (Ultratip Bubbling Under Wallonia)	82
Colombia (National-Report)	1
Mexico (Monitor Latino)	1
Mexico (Billboard Mexican Airplay)	14
Spain (Promusicae)	50
US Bubbling Under Hot 100 (Billboard)	19
US Hot Latin Songs (Billboard)	1
US Latin Pop Songs (Billboard)	3
Venezuela (Record Report)	1

=== Year-end charts ===
Chart (2012)	Peak position
US Latin Songs (Billboard)	74
Venezuela (Record Report)	48

== See also ==
- List of number-one songs of 2012 (Mexico)
- List of number-one Billboard Top Latin Songs of 2012
