= Yerbatero =

Single by Juanes

from the album P.A.R.C.E.
- Released: June 10, 2010
- Recorded: April 2010 (London and Miami)
- Genre: Rock
- Length: 3:24 (single version); 3:32 (album version)
- Label: Universal
- Songwriter: Juanes
- Producers: Juanes; Stephen Lipson

Juanes singles chronology
"Hoy Me Voy" (2008)	"Yerbatero" (2010)	"La Calle" (2010)

Alternative cover
- Remixes EP cover

"Yerbatero" (English: Herbalist) is a rock song by Colombian singer-songwriter Juanes released as the lead single from his fifth studio album P.A.R.C.E.. It was released digitally on June 10, 2010 through Universal Records. A Digital EP with three remixes was released later on October 12, 2010. It is also released a Banda version of the song on October 19, 2010.

== Background ==
The song is written and produced by Juanes himself along with Stephen Lipson, who has worked with artists such as Annie Lennox and Paul McCartney. The lyrics relate to people who suffer from love and its hardships.

== Critical reception ==
Ricardo Companioni from Aol Radio Blog said that "The guitar-driven rock track produced Stephen Lipson, is a total departure from the romantic pop songs that permeated his last album".

=== Live performances ===
The song was performed for the first time at FIFA's 2010 World Cup Kick-Off Concert at June 10, 2010, in Orlando Stadium in Johannesburg along with his hit single "La Camisa Negra". He was invited along artists such as Shakira, The Black Eyed Peas and Alicia Keys, among other artists. He also performed the song during Colombia's inauguration day and at the 2010 Premios Juventud.

=== Chart performance ===
The song debuted at number 35 on the Billboard Hot Latin Songs, and number 4 on the Latin Pop Songs. On Spain the song debuted at number #27. Herbalist has been a success since its launch, only 12 hours of its release and was ranked number one in Colombia and in 6,400 after selling iTunes downloads in the first week. On the Billboard Latin Songs, the song is charted at number one, becoming on his seventh number one single on the chart. "Yerbatero" debuted on the Bubbling Under Hot 100 Singles chart of Billboard, at position 17, equivalent to position 117 on the Billboard Hot 100.

== Music video ==
Juanes on his music video for "Yerbatero".

=== Development ===
A music video for the song directed by Brandon Parvini was shot; filming commencing on May 29, 2010 according to a making of video released on his website. The video premiered on July 14, 2010.

=== Synopsis ===
The video shows Juanes playing guitar and singing in outer space as they grow flowers and plants around because it is a matter which is inspired by the ancient sorcerers who roamed the villages to sell natural ways to heal.

== Track listing ==
iTunes digital single

No.	Title	Writer(s)	Producer(s)	Length
1.	"Yerbatero"	Juanes.	Juanes, Stephen Lipson	3:24

== Charts ==
Chart (2010)	Peak position
Colombia (National-Report)	1
Mexico (Monitor Latino)	7
Slovakia Airplay (ČNS IFPI)	47
Spain (Promusicae)	25
US Bubbling Under Hot 100 (Billboard)	17
US Latin Songs	1
US Latin Pop Songs	2
US Tropical Songs	2
Venezuelan Top Latino (Record Report)	4

=== Year-end charts ===
Chart (2010)	Position
US Latin Songs Year End 2010	25
US Latin Pop Songs Year End 2010	16

== Versions/remixes ==
- Album version – 3:24
- Banda version – 3:26
- Soul Mekanik Remix – 6:41
- Tarantella & Redanka Remix – 6:32
- Histeria Music Group Remix – 4:40

== Release history ==
Country	Date	Label	Format
Worldwide	June 10, 2010	Universal	Airplay / Digital download
Worldwide	October 12, 2010	Universal	Digital EP (Remixes)
Worldwide	October 19, 2010	Universal	Banda version
