= Gotas de Agua Dulce =

Single by Juanes

from the album La Vida... Es Un Ratico
- Released: 17 December 2007
- Recorded: 2007
- Genre: Latin, rock en español
- Length: 3:13
- Label: Universal
- Songwriter: Juanes
- Producer: Gustavo Santaolalla

Juanes singles chronology
"Me Enamora" (2007)	"Gotas de Agua Dulce" (2007)	"Tres" (2008)

"Gotas de Agua Dulce" (Eng.: Drops of Fresh Water) is the title of the second single released by Juanes from his fourth studio album La Vida... Es Un Ratico.

== Chart performance ==
The track debuted in the United States Billboard Hot Latin Tracks chart at number 33 on 19 January 2008, and in the week of 23 February 2008, the single peaked at number 1, dethroning his own single "Me Enamora" which spent 20 non-consecutive weeks at the summit.

In Mexico, a preloaded bundle of audio and video tracks including "Me Enamora", "La Vida Es Un Ratico", "Gotas de Agua Dulce" and "Webisode" was certified 2×Platinum+Gold by Asociación Mexicana de Productores de Fonogramas y Videogramas (AMPROFON) for selling 250,000 units.

== Charts and certifications ==
=== Weekly charts ===
Chart (2008)	Peak position
Mexico (Monitor Latino)	1
Spain (PROMUSICAE)	10
US Bubbling Under Hot 100 (Billboard)	2
US Hot Latin Songs (Billboard)	1
US Latin Pop Airplay (Billboard)	1
US Latin Rhythm Airplay (Billboard)	1
US Tropical Airplay (Billboard)	1
Venezuela (Record Report)	1
Venezuela Pop Rock (Record Report)	5

=== Year-end charts ===
Chart (2008)	Position
Spain (PROMUSICAE)	30

=== Certifications ===
Region	Certification	Certified units/sales
Mexico (AMPROFON) Pre-loaded	2× Platinum+Gold	250,000^{*}
Spain (Promusicae)	Platinum	20,000^{*}
^{*} Sales figures based on certification alone.

== See also ==
- List of number-one songs of 2008 (Mexico)
