= Y No Regresas =

Single by Juanes

from the album P.A.R.C.E.
- Released: October 12, 2010
- Genre: Latin rock, alternative rock
- Length: 3:05
- Label: Universal
- Songwriter: Juan Esteban Aristizábal
- Producers: Juanes, Stephen Lipson

Juanes singles chronology
"La Calle" (2010)	"Y No Regresas" (2010)	"Regalito" (2010)

"Y No Regresas" (English: And You Don't Return) is a song by Colombian singer-songwriter Juanes released as the second single from his upcoming studio album P.A.R.C.E.. It was released airplay on 11 October and digitally on 12 October 2010 through Universal Records. The song is written and produced by himself and Stephen Lipson. Just 2 hours of release to radio on his native Colombia, the song was located on the top number one of the listings. Due to that song received heavy airplay, it was entered to the Top 10 on the Spanish-speaking airplay charts.

== Critical reception ==
The Staff from Latin Gossip said "It’s a rock power ballad for Juanes, reminiscent of a slow-tempo U2 ballad. [...] this new track goes out to those that prefer a more melancholic tune."

== Music video ==
Juanes on the music video.

=== Development ===
The music video for the song was filmed in Los Angeles, California and was directed by Lex Halaby who has filmed music videos for The Offspring and Hoobastank.

=== Synopsis ===
The video which lasts three minutes and 14 seconds, shows Juanes nostalgic and pensive while he walks through the streets of a city singing. The occasional lighting of passing cars breaks the darkness that surrounding Juanes and projected onto the wall to the other protagonists, leftovers of him and the wet road by an alleged and persistent rain.

=== Release and reception ===
The music video was described on the way that "reflects the melancholy and solitude that expresses the song's lyrics". A preview of the video was released first on 29 September 2010 through his Twitter. The full music video was premiered on 21 October 2010.

== Chart performance ==
The song debuted at number 36 on the Billboard Latin Pop Songs. On the week of 13 November 2010 the song debuted at number 27 on the Latin Songs. On the Spanish Airplay Chart the song debuted at number 3. The week of 4 December 2010 the song debuted at number 40 on the Billboard Latin Tropical Airplay.

=== Charts ===
Chart (2010)	Peak position
Spain Airplay Chart	1
Mexican Airplay Chart	8
US Hot Latin Songs (Billboard)	9
US Latin Pop Airplay (Billboard)	5
US Tropical Airplay (Billboard)	20

== Release history ==
Country	Date	Label	Format
Worldwide	October 11, 2010	Universal	Radio premiere
Worldwide	October 12, 2010	Universal	Digital download
