= Giovanni Bellezza =

Giovanni Bellezza (1807-1876) was an Italian sculptor. He was primarily a sculptor of bronzes and an engraver.

He was commissioned in 1842 by the City of Milan to create the items commemorating citizenship offered to Vittorio Emanuele II at the wedding celebrated with Maria Adelaide of Habsburg-Lorraine. In 1854 he engraved the paliotto in Milan Cathedral, in the chapel of the Madonna of the Tree. In 1856 he was commissioned by Emperor Franz Joseph of Austria to recreate two reliquaries in gold, based on sixteenth century works originally by Nicola da Milano to a design by Benvenuto Cellini which had been stolen in 1848 and melted down by Austrian troops. These relics are now preserved in the Basilica of Sant'Andrea, Mantua. For the 1800 anniversary of the martyrdom of St. Peter, he created a chalice with detail on the foot with the Sacrifice of Abraham.

Bellezza was buried in the Monumental Cemetery of Milan; his marble bust was placed in the upper gallery of the Brera Academy.
