= P.A.R.C.E. =

Studio album by Juanes
- Released: December 7, 2010
- Recorded: May – October 2010 (London, Miami, Medellín)
- Genre: Pop; Latin rock; Pop rock; rock
- Length: 37:05 (Standard edition); 43:40 (Deluxe edition)
- Label: Universal Music Latino
- Producer: Juanes; Stephen Lipson

Juanes chronology
La vida... es un ratico (en vivo) (2008)	P.A.R.C.E. (2010)	Juanes MTV Unplugged (2012)

Singles from P.A.R.C.E.
- 1. "Yerbatero" Released: June 10, 2010; 2. "Y No Regresas" Released: October 12, 2010; 3. "Regalito" Released: March 1, 2011

Professional ratings
Review scores
Source	Rating
Allmusic	4/5 stars

P.A.R.C.E. is the fifth studio album by Colombian recording artist Juanes. It was released on December 7, 2010, through Universal Music Latino. The album's lead single "Yerbatero" was released on June 10, 2010 as a digital download. "Y No Regresas" was released as the second single on October 12, 2010. "Regalito" was released as the third single on January 11, 2011.

On February 17, 2011, Juanes performed live the third single, Regalito, from the album at the annual Latin awards show, Premios Lo Nuestro. The album has sold 1 million copies worldwide and was certified gold in Spain and platinum in the United States.

== Background ==
The phrase PARCE is an abbreviation of "parcero," a typical expression in Colombian Spanish meaning "friend" in Antioquia Colombia, where Juanes is from. In May 2010, Juanes announced he was working in the studio with album producer Stephen Lipson to record a new album in London. The album's first single was "Yerbatero". Juanes has said that the album contains messages of love, peace and freedom as well a very personal statement in the song "La Razón", which speaks of the joy of the reunion with his wife after their separation, the birth of their son and "The wonder that is home." The album was released in two editions. The Standard edition includes 10 tracks, and the Deluxe edition includes 12 tracks, plus two videos, two behind-the-scenes looks, and a documentary of P.A.R.C.E.

== Chart performance ==
Juanes' last two albums, Mi Sangre and La vida... es un ratico, charted within the Top 40 of the album chart as well as the peak position of the Billboard Top Latin Albums. P.A.R.C.E peaked at #2 of the Billboard Latin Albums Chart behind fellow Colombian singer Shakira's album Sale el Sol, which was in its eighth week of charting in the #1 position. It also arrived at #2 on the Billboard Latin Pop Albums, again behind Shakira. The album also debuted on the Billboard 200 at #165, a disappointment compared to the #13 debut and peak position of La Vida...Es un Ratico.

The album debuted at #14 on the Spanish Albums Chart, becoming his lowest debut; it also received gold certification after its first week sales. The album also debuted at #12 on the Mexican Albums Chart.

P.A.R.C.E. has sold 40,000 copies in Colombia achieved the position #1, and also has sold 30,000 copies in Spain and achieving gold certification. The album has sold 1 million copies worldwide.

== Promotion ==
As a part of promotion, Juanes announced to his fans through his Twitter account to submit pictures of their faces for the chance to be part of the official album artwork; of which, 3,000 pictures were included in the album art.

=== Singles ===
- "Yerbatero" was released as the album's lead single on June 10, 2010. The song was premiered and performed for the first time at FIFA's 2010 World Cup Kick-Off Concert at June 10, 2010, in Orlando Stadium in Johannesburg. The song becoming on his seventh number one single on the Billboard Latin Songs topped for one week.
- "Y No Regresas" was released airplay on October 11 and digitally on October 12, 2010 as the album's second single. The music video was premiered on October 21, 2010.
- "Regalito" The song was previously released as a promotional single from the album in November 2010. For the January 11, 2011, the song was released to radio as the third single from the album.

=== Promo singles ===
Prior to the release of the album, three promotional singles will be released exclusively on Apple's iTunes Store as a "Countdown to P.A.R.C.E.".

- "Esta Noche" was the first promotional single, released on November 9, 2010.
- "La Soledad" was the second promotional single, released on November 16, 2010.
- "Regalito" was the third and final promotional single, released on November 23, 2010.

== Track listing ==
- Juanes wrote and co-produced every song on the album. Others who worked on the songs are given below.

No.	Title	Length
1.	"Amigos"	03:36
2.	"Yerbatero"	03:32
3.	"La Soledad"	03:15
4.	"La Razón"	04:19
5.	"Segovia"	03:07
6.	"El Amor Lo Cura Todo"	03:37
7.	"Todos Los Días"	03:55
8.	"Y No Regresas"	03:08
9.	"Lo Nuestro"	04:11
10.	"Esta Noche"	04:36

Deluxe edition
No.	Title	Length
1.	"Quimera"	03:45
2.	"Regalito"	02:53
3.	"Amigos"	03:36
4.	"Yerbatero"	03:32
5.	"La Soledad"	03:15
6.	"La Razón"	04:19
7.	"Segovia"	03:07
8.	"El Amor Lo Cura Todo"	03:37
9.	"Todos Los Días"	03:55
10.	"Y No Regresas"	03:08
11.	"Lo Nuestro"	04:11
12.	"Esta Noche"	04:36

Deluxe edition - Bonus DVD
No.	Title	Length
1.	"Yerbatero" (Music video)	03:28
2.	"Yerbatero" (Behind the Scenes: Video Shoot)	02:55
3.	"Y No Regresas" (Music video)	03:08
4.	"Y No Regresas" (Making Of)	03:08
5.	"P.A.R.C.E. (Documentary)"

== Personnel ==
Taken and adapted from Allmusic.com.

- Edoardo Chavarin - Art Direction, Graphic Design
- Juan Esteban Aristizabal (Juanes) - Composer, Bass, Guitar (Acoustic, Electric), Lyricist, Producer, Soloist
- Fernando Tobon - Bass, Guitar, Guitar (Acoustic), Guitar (Rhythm), Mandolin
- Victor Indrizzo - Drums
- Ash Soan - Drums
- Alberto Campos - Graphic Design, Production Design
- Phil Palmer - Guitar
- Pete Murray - Horn Arrangements, Keyboard Arrangements, Keyboards, Orchestration
- Emmanuel Briceño - Keyboards
- Geoffrey Richardson - Mandolin
- Felipe Alzate - Percussion
- Luis Jardim - Percussion
- Rene Shenouda - Photography
- Stephen Lipson - Producer
- Dean Guillard - Production Coordination
- Heidi Puon - Production Design
- Melanie Nakhla - Vocals (Background)

== Charts ==
=== Weekly charts ===
Chart (2010)	Peak position
Mexican Albums (AMPROFON)	12
Mexican International Albums (AMPROFON)	10
Spanish Albums (PROMUSICAE)	14
US Billboard 200	165
US Top Latin Albums (Billboard)	2
US Latin Pop Albums (Billboard)	2

=== Year-end charts ===
Chart (2011)	Position
US Top Latin Albums (Billboard)	30

== Certifications ==
Region	Certification	Certified units/sales
Colombia	2× Platinum	40,000
Spain (PROMUSICAE)	Gold	30,000^{^}
^{^} Shipments figures based on certification alone.
