= Me Enamora =

2007 single by Juanes

Single by Juanes

from the album La Vida... Es Un Ratico
- Released: September 3, 2007
- Recorded: 2006–2007
- Studio: Estudio IO, Buenos Aires, Argentina; La Casa y Henson Studios, Hollywood, California; Track Record, North Hollywood, California
- Genre: Latin pop; pop rock; funk rock
- Length: 3:14
- Label: Universal Music Latino
- Songwriter: Juanes
- Producer: Gustavo Santaolalla

Juanes singles chronology
"La Vida... Es Un Ratico" (2007)	"Me Enamora" (2007)	"Gotas de Agua Dulce" (2007)

"Me Enamora" (English: It Makes Me Fall in Love) is a song written and performed by Colombian singer and songwriter, Juanes. The song is the first radio single of his fourth solo studio album La Vida... Es Un Ratico (2007) and it received three awards for Record of the Year, Song of the Year and Best Short Form Music Video at the Latin Grammy Awards of 2008. The song was included in the game Rock Band 3. In 2012, Juanes re-released the single with a new version, that was performed on his album MTV Unplugged. On 14 May 2012, it was made available on iTunes. The song was included at No. 26 on MTV Tres's Top 100 of 2012.

== Chart performance ==
The song debuted at number-one on the U.S. Billboard Hot Latin Tracks, one of the few songs to do so, in the week of 29 September 2007. This single spent 20 non-consecutive weeks at number one on the Hot Latin Tracks charts. Only one single had spent more weeks at number 1 on this chart: "La Tortura", by fellow Colombian performer Shakira featuring Alejandro Sanz, which stayed on top for 25 weeks. It reached number 1 on 14 countries.

In Mexico, a preloaded bundle of audio and video tracks including "Me Enamora", "La Vida Es Un Ratico", "Gotas de Agua Dulce" and "Webisode" was certified 2×Platinum+Gold by Asociación Mexicana de Productores de Fonogramas y Videogramas (AMPROFON) for selling 250,000 unites.

== Track listing ==
- CD single
1. "Me Enamora" – 3:14 (Single Version)
- Maxi single
1. "Me Enamora" – 3:13
2. "Vulnerable" – 4:26
3. "Fíjate Bien" – 4:51
4. Un Día Normal" – 3:42
- iTunes Digital Download
1. "Me Enamora (MTV Unplugged)" – 3:20

== Charts and certifications ==
=== Weekly charts ===
Chart (2007–08)	Peak position
Austria (Ö3 Austria Top 40)	34
Belgium (Ultratip Bubbling Under Flanders)	18
Belgium (Ultratip Bubbling Under Wallonia)	22
CIS Airplay (TopHit)	51
European Hot 100 Singles (Billboard)	27
France (SNEP)	12
Germany (GfK)	29
Hungary (Rádiós Top 40)	36
Italy (FIMI)	33
Netherlands (Single Top 100)	48
Slovakia Airplay (ČNS IFPI)	30
Spain (PROMUSICAE)	1
Switzerland (Schweizer Hitparade)	13
US Billboard Hot 100	69
US Hot Latin Songs (Billboard)	1
US Latin Pop Airplay (Billboard)	1
Venezuela Top Latino (Record Report)	1
Venezuela Pop Rock (Record Report)	4

=== Year-end charts ===
Chart (2007)	Position
Switzerland (Schweizer Hitparade)	83
US Hot Latin Songs (Billboard)	28
Chart (2008)	Position
Spain (PROMUSICAE)	21
US Hot Latin Songs (Billboard)	4

=== All-time charts ===
Chart (2021)	Position
US Hot Latin Songs (Billboard)	10

=== Certifications ===
Region	Certification	Certified units/sales
Mexico (AMPROFON) Master Ringtone	2× Diamond+3× Platinum+2× Gold	595,000^{*}
Mexico (AMPROFON) Pre-loaded media	2× Platinum+Gold	250,000^{*}
Spain (Promusicae)	6× Platinum	120,000^{*}
Spain (Promusicae) Ringtone	8× Platinum	160,000^{*}
^{*} Sales figures based on certification alone.

== Me Enamora (MTV Unplugged) ==
"Me Enamora"

Single by Juanes

from the album MTV Unplugged
- Released: May 14, 2012
- Recorded: 2012
- Genre: Latin pop
- Length: 3:20
- Label: Universal Music Latino
- Songwriter: Juanes
- Producers: Gustavo Santaolalla; Juan Luis Guerra

Juanes singles chronology
"Hoy Me Voy" (2012)	"Me Enamora" (2012)	"La Flaca" (2013)

Juanes re-released the single with a new version, that was performed on his MTV Unplugged. On 14 May 2012 is available on iTunes. This version was nominated for Rock/Alternative Song of the Year at the Premio Lo Nuestro 2013.

=== Track listing ===
iTunes digital download
No.	Title	{{{extra_column}}}	Length
1.	"Me Enamora (MTV Unplugged)"	Juanes	3:20

=== Charts ===
==== Weekly charts ====
Chart (2012)	Peak position
Mexico (Billboard Mexican Airplay)	10
US Hot Latin Songs (Billboard)	2
US Latin Pop Airplay (Billboard)	3
