= Emayla =

Italian singer-songwriter

EMAYLA
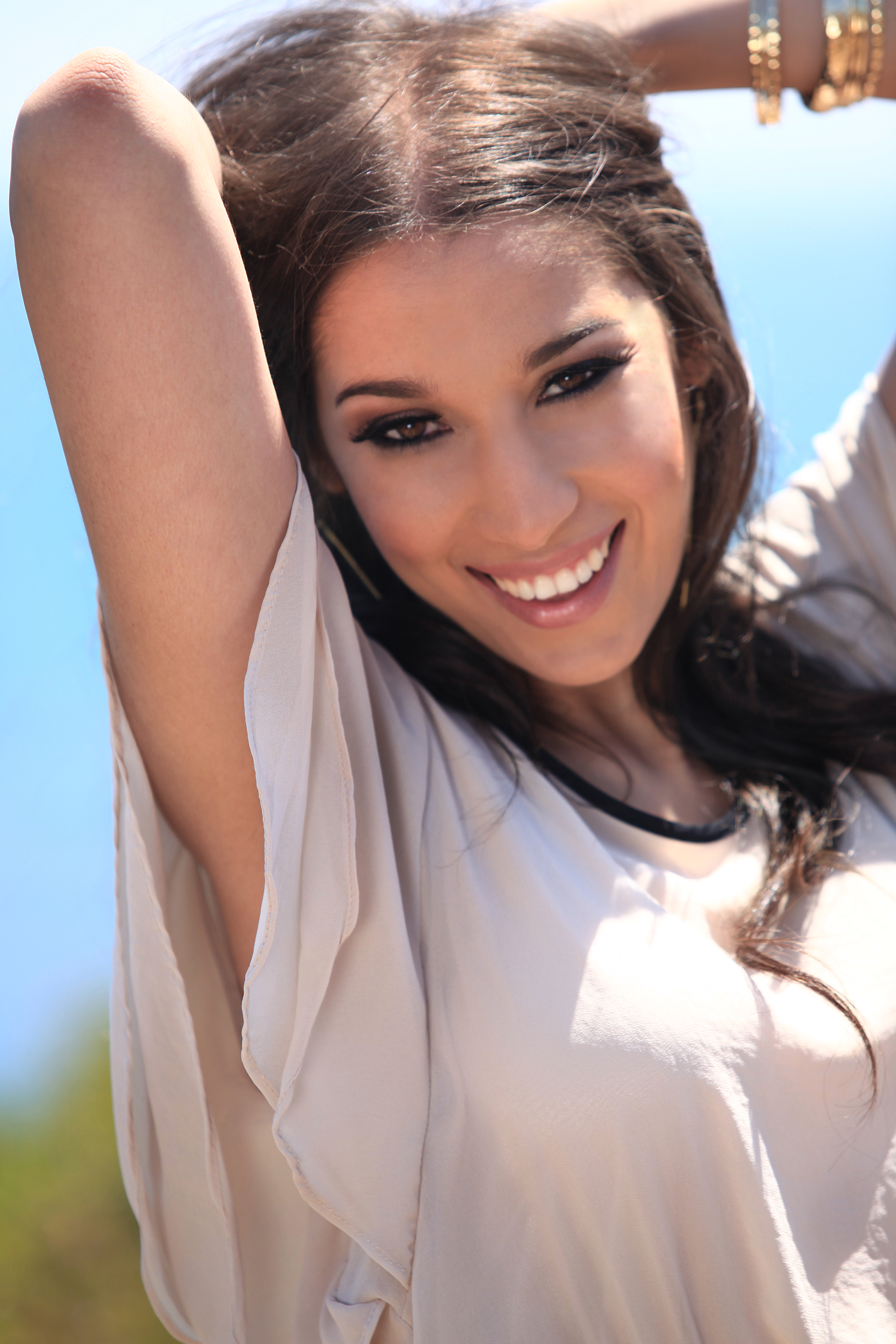

Background information
- Born: San Remo, Liguria, Italy
- Origin: Los Angeles, California, United States
- Genres: R&B/Soul; Pop; Ambience
- Occupations: Singer-songwriter; record producer
- Instruments: Vocals, piano, guitar
- Years active: 2005–present
- Website: http://www.emayla.com

EMAYLA, also known as Emanuela Bellezza is an Italian-American singer, songwriter, guitarist and pianist, who gained popularity with her original music, after appearing on television networks MTV Très, Univision, RAI, Telefutura and TV Azteca. In 2012, she won a nationwide contest by MTV Très and was chosen by Colombian singer Juanes to sing a duet with him for inclusion on the Deluxe Edition of his album Juanes MTV Unplugged. Emayla won the contest by performing a cover of Juanes' song Fotografia. The album won a Grammy in 2013 as Best Latin Pop Album category. It also won two Latin Grammys: Album of The Year and Best Long Form Music Video. The video of their performance counts over a million and a half views on YouTube. As a result of these achievements, Emayla's song titled Ella Se Va was played in different main radios in Venezuela and reached the top 40 national music charts in the same country.

== Early life ==
Emayla was born in San Remo, a small town in the Italian Riviera (North of Italy) and started taking music lessons when she was three years old. At age seven she took her first piano lesson, at age fifteen her first guitar lesson and at age eighteen her first vocal lesson. She began songwriting as a teenager, and aspired to a music career in Los Angeles.

At age sixteen she wrote her very first song, which was in English and it was called Fly Away. She studied foreign languages in high school and she graduated at the University La Sapienza of Rome in Foreign Languages and Modern Cultures. During the high school and university years, she kept writing songs and she continued her musical studies. At age eighteen, Bellezza joined her first band and started having live performance experience. She participated to various Italian music competitions and festivals with her original songs and she was one of the finalists at Castrocaro and Singing for Life music contest.

In 2007, at age twenty-three, Bellezza decided to move to Los Angeles, California where she attended Musicians Institute and graduated for the Vocal Program in 2009.

== Career ==
- In 2009, Emayla song "Stay With Me" was nominated for Best R&B/Soul Song by The Hollywood Music In Media Awards and she was featured on Music Connection magazine where she earned a recognition as Hottest Unsigned Artist of The Year.
- In August 2010, Emayla and her band were finalists at the competition called Battle Of The Bands, at the Hard Rock Cafe, in Las Vegas. She was also finalist as a songwriter and singer at the Italian contest called Demo D'Autore, that went live on Italian radio called Radio Rai, which is part of Italian main TV Station, RAI.
- She was a finalist in the 2011 John Lennon Songwriting Contest with her own song Esperanza de Amor.
- In 2012, besides performing with Juanes at the MTV Unplugged on MTV Tres, Emanuela also performed in duet with singer Franco De Vita at the Gibson Amphitheater and opened for Italian singer Jovanotti, at the El Rey Theatre, in Los Angeles.
- In 2013, Emayla released her album Ella Se Va, which was produced by multi-Grammy award winner Gustavo Borner.
- In 2013, her song "Lo Que Se Da Regresa" made her the finalist at the U.S.A. Songwriting Competition. On February 18 of that year, Emanuela appeared on Italian national television RAI and specifically on Rai Gulp, during the program "La TV Ribelle".
- In July 2014, Emayla songs, "Eres Tú" and "Emilia" were featured in a Season 2 episode of Hulu's series, East Los High.
- At the 2015 Rumi Awards in Las Vegas, Bellezza was the winner of "Best Artist - Europe" and "Best Singer - Duet".
- In 2016 Emayla worked with bass player Nathan East on the song "I Love To Dance", composed by the group "80's DNA Reloaded".
- In 2019 Emayla released her album titled "New Freedom", written by herself and produced by Darryl Swann. and herself.

== Discography ==
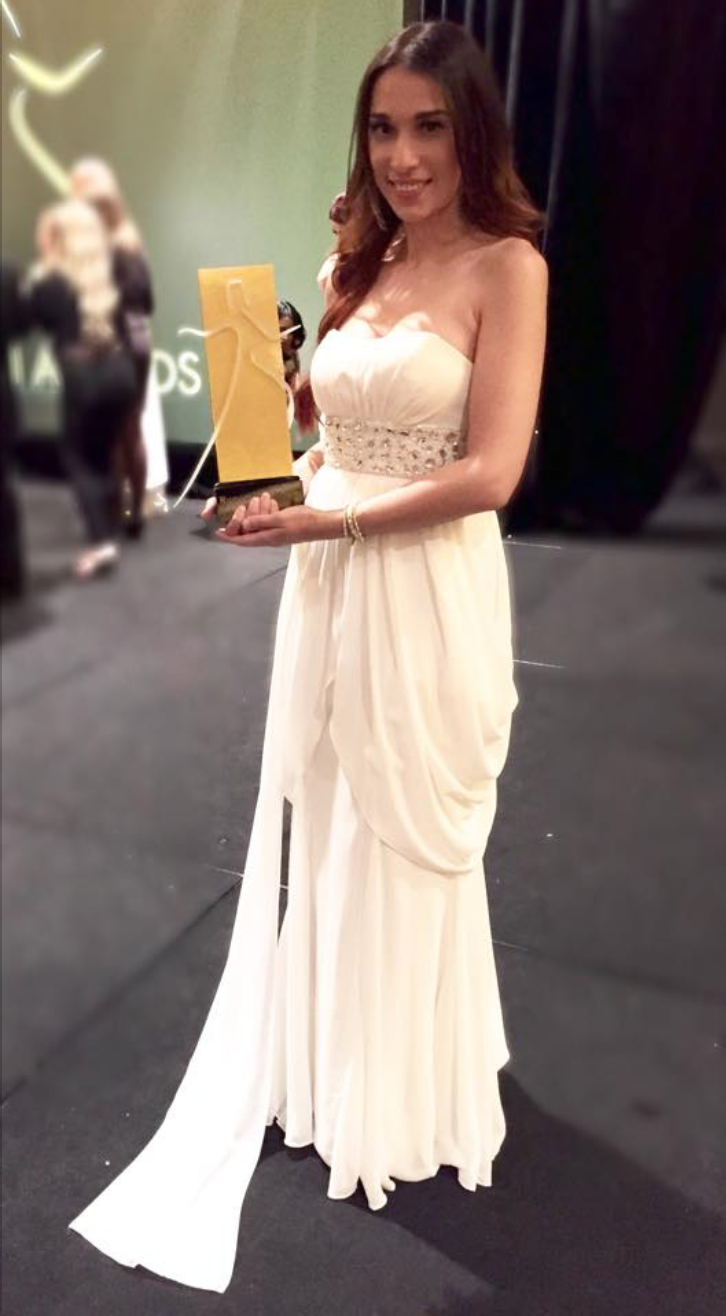
Emayla at Rumi Awards 2015 in Las Vegas, winning "Best Artist Europe" and "Best Duet Singer" award.

=== Studio albums ===
- 2011 Matices De Amor
- 2019 New Freedom

=== EPs ===
- 2009 Rain And Sunshine Of Heart
- 2013 Ella Se Va

=== Songs appearing in film and television ===
- 2009 Tu Estilo - Univision 34
- 2011 Lanzate - Telefutura
- 2012 Lanzate - Telefutura
- 2013 Primer Impacto - Univision 34
- 2014 East Los High - Episode #3
- 2014 East Los High - Episode #8

== Television appearances ==
- 2009 Tu Estilo - Univision 34
- 2011 Lanzate - Telefutura
- 2012 Lanzate - Telefutura
- 2012 MTV Unplugged With Juanes - MTV Tres
- 2013 News - CNN en Español
- 2013 News - TV Azteca
- 2013 Despierta America - Univision 34

== Awards and nominations ==
Year	Award	Nominated work	Category	Result
2009	Hollywood Music In Media Award	"Stay With Me"	Best R&B/Soul Song	Nominated
2011	The John Lennon Songwriting Contest	"Esperanza De Amor"	Best Latin Song	Finalist
2013	U.S.A. Songwriting Competition	"Lo Que Se Da Regresa"	Best Song	Finalist
2015	Rumi Awards	Performance	Best Artist Europe	Winner
2015	Rumi Awards	Performance	Best Singer - Duet	Winner

== YouTube recognition ==
Because of her notability on YouTube, Emayla has been mentioned on Italian magazine Idea Web as "one of the most talented and beautiful musicians on YouTube".

== Musical style and influences ==
Emayla describes her music as a fusion of pop and soul. She cites Aretha Franklin, Joss Stone, Jhené Aiko and Tracy Chapman as influences when she was younger. Some of her early stages' work has been compared to Laura Pausini.
