= Mil Pedazos =

Single by Juanes

from the album Loco de Amor
- Released: March 7, 2014
- Genre: Latin pop
- Length: 3:11
- Label: Universal Music Latino
- Songwriters: Juanes; Emmanuel del Real

Juanes singles chronology
"La Luz" (2013)	"Mil Pedazos" (2014)	"Una Flor" (2014)

"Mil Pedazos" ("Thousand Pieces") is a song performed by Colombian singer-songwriter Juanes for his sixth studio album Loco de Amor (2014). Written by the singer, and the member of the Mexican band Café Tacuba, Emmanuel Del Real, and produced by Juanes with the collaboration of Steve Lillywhite, Universal Music Latino released the song as the second single from Loco de Amor on March 7, 2014.

== Production and release ==
"Mil Pedazos" was written by Juanes himself and Emmanuel Del Real, member of the Mexican band Café Tacuba. Production of the song was helmed by Juanes and co-produced by Steve Lillywhite. Matty Green engineered the song and mixed it together with Lillywhite. "Mil Pedazos" was recorded in two studios: Henson Recording Studios in Hollywood, and Perfect Sound Studios in California. The song was included on Juanes' sixth studio album Loco de Amor, which was released worldwide on April 11, 2014.

== Chart performance ==
In Colombia, "Mil Pedazos" debuted at number 10 on the National-Report ending April 14, 2014. In the United States, the song debuted at number 30 on the Billboard Latin Pop Songs chart, and in Mexico on the Billboard Mexican Airplay chart peaked at number 33.

== Credits and personnel ==
Recording

- Recorded at Henson Recording Studios, Hollywood, California and Perfect Sound Studios, Los Angeles, California.

Personnel

- Songwriting – Juanes, Emmanuel Del Real
- Production – Juanes, Steve Lillywhite
- Vocal engineering and recording – Matty Green
- Mixing – Steve Lillywhite, Matty Green

Credits adapted from the liner notes of Loco de Amor, Universal Music Latino, Parce Music LLC (BMI).

== Charts ==
Chart (2014–18)	Peak position
Colombia (National-Report)	5
Dominican Republic Pop (Monitor Latino)	8
Ecuador (National-Report)	81
Mexico Airplay (Billboard)	18
Spain Airplay (PROMUSICAE)	9
US Hot Latin Songs (Billboard)	47
US Latin Airplay (Billboard)	33
US Latin Pop Airplay (Billboard)	13
US Tropical Airplay (Billboard)	30

== Release history ==
List of radio and release dates, showing country, format, version and record label
Region	Date	Format	Version	Label
Worldwide	March 7, 2014	Music video	Promotional single	Universal Music Latino
Latin America	March 19, 2014	Airplay	Main single	Universal Music Latino
Mexico	April 15, 2014	Digital download	Main single	Universal Music Latino
Spain	April 15, 2014	Digital download	Main single	Universal Music Latino
