= La Calle (song) =

Single by Juan Luis Guerra featuring Juanes

from the album A Son de Guerra
- Released: 1 September 2010 (U.S. radio)
- Recorded: 2010
- Length: 3:34
- Label: Capitol Latin
- Songwriters: Juan Luis Guerra; Juan Esteban Aristizábal
- Producers: Juan Luis Guerra; Juanes

Juan Luis Guerra singles chronology
"La Guagua" (2010)	"La Calle" (2010)	"Mi Bendición" (2011)

Juanes singles chronology
"Yerbatero" (2010)	"La Calle" (2010)	"Y No Regresas" (2010)

"La Calle" (English: The Street) is a song written, produced and performed by the Dominican singer Juan Luis Guerra and the Colombian singer Juanes. The song was chosen as the fourth single from the eleventh album by Juan Luis Guerra, A Son de Guerra released for airplay on 1 September 2010.

== Music video ==
A music video for the song was filmed in Santo Domingo, directed by Jean Gabriel Guerra. It was premiered on 2 September 2010.

== Chart performance ==
The song debuted at number 36 on the Latin Pop Songs in the United States. On the week of 23 October 2010 the song debuted at number 41 on the Latin Songs.

=== Charts ===
Chart (2010)	Peak position
US Hot Latin Songs (Billboard)	26
US Latin Pop Airplay (Billboard)	9
