= Tres (song) =

Single by Juanes

from the album La Vida... Es un Ratico
- Released: 2008
- Recorded: 2007
- Genre: Latin, Rock en Español
- Length: 3:25
- Label: Universal
- Songwriter: Juanes
- Producer: Gustavo Santaolalla

Juanes singles chronology
"Gotas de Agua Dulce" (2007)	"Tres" (2008)	"Tú y Yo" (2008)

"Tres" (Eng.: Three) is the title of a pop song written and performed by Colombian singer-songwriter Juanes. This song was released as the third single from his fourth studio album La Vida... Es un Ratico.

== Track listing ==
This information from Allmusic.

1. Album version – 3:25
2. Full Phat Remix – 3:48

== Chart performance ==
=== Weekly charts ===
Weekly chart performance for "Tres"
Chart (2008)	Peak position
CIS Airplay (TopHit)	75
New Zealand (Recorded Music NZ)	82
Russia Airplay (TopHit)	76
US Hot Latin Songs (Billboard)	21
US Latin Pop Airplay (Billboard)	13

=== Year-end charts ===
Year-end chart performance for "Tres"
Chart (2008)	Position
Russia Airplay (TopHit)	180
