= Odio por Amor =

Single by Juanes

from the album La Vida... Es un Ratico en Vivo and La Vida... Es un Ratico (Re-Release)
- Released: September 8, 2008
- Recorded: August 8, 2008
- Genre: Latin, Rock en Español
- Length: 4:02
- Label: Universal
- Songwriter: Juanes

Juanes singles chronology
"Tú y Yo" (2008)	"Odio por Amor" (2008)	"Hoy Me Voy" (2008)

"Odio por Amor" (Eng.: Hate for Love) is a song written and performed by Colombian singer-songwriter Juanes. This song was included on his first live album La vida... es un ratico (en vivo).

== Song history ==
The song received a worldwide distribution on September 8, 2008, and was recorded on August 8, 2008, with the band that joins Juanes on tour. It is the first single from the re-released version of his latest album, La Vida... Es un Ratico. The singer said about the song: "It is a powerful anthem for love and change, a universal need to change hate for love." This track was written while Juanes was on the Spanish leg of his tour and he refused to wait two years to release it on his next album. The music video for this single was directed by Agustín Alberdi and shot on a military base near Buenos Aires, Argentina on a twelve-hour session on location in Morón. On this video, Juanes is shown driving a toy car, travelling through the world collecting flags from different countries.

== Chart performance ==
Chart (2008)	Peak position
US Bubbling Under Hot 100 (Billboard)	25
US Hot Latin Songs (Billboard)	5
US Latin Pop Airplay (Billboard)	3
