= Asociación Colombiana de Productores de Fonogramas =

Colombian trade association

The Colombian Association of Phonogram Producers (Spanish: Asociación Colombiana de Productores de Fonogramas, ASINCOL) was a trade group representing the recording industry in Colombia.

ASINCOL was responsible for music recording sales certification in Colombia and was list as the International Standard Recording Code (ISRC) agency for Colombia until October 2008. It was later closed and no local ISRC agency was list in Colombia from November 2008 to July 2021. In 2022, the Colombian Association of Performers and Phonogram Producers (Spanish: Asociación Colombiana de Intérpretes y Productores Fonográficos, ACINPRO) replaced it as the local ISRC agency for that country.

== Sales certificates ==
ASINCOL was responsible for awarding music recording certifications in Colombia until the organization closed. The certification levels for albums until 2000 were 30,000 for gold and 60,000 for Platinum. Until 2004 were 15,000 for Gold and 30,000 for Platinum. Due to low sales, the levels were lowered in 2004 to 10,000 for Gold and 20,000 for Platinum. In 2007 the lower levels for international repertoire were introduced, requiring 5,000 units for Gold and 10,000 for Platinum, while the domestic levels remained unchanged.

ASINCOL also certified music videos, with certification levels of 5,000 for Gold and 10,000 for Platinum.
