= Fíjate Bien (song) =

2000 single by Juanes

Single by Juanes

from the album Fíjate Bien
- Released: August 7, 2000
- Recorded: 2000
- Genre: Latin rock
- Length: 4:54
- Label: Universal Music Latino
- Songwriter: Juanes
- Producer: Gustavo Santaolalla

Juanes singles chronology
"Fíjate Bien" (2000)	"Podemos Hacernos Daño" (2000)

"Fíjate Bien" (English: "Focus") is a song written and performed by Colombian singer-songwriter Juanes. The song is the title track and first radio single from his debut solo studio album, Fíjate Bien.

This track won the Latin Grammy Award for Best Rock Song at the Latin Grammy Awards of 2001.

== Track listing ==
1. "Fíjate Bien" (radio edit) –
2. "Fíjate Bien" (album version) – 4:54
