= Es Por Ti =

Single by Juanes

from the album Un Día Normal
- Released: September 23, 2002
- Recorded: December 2001 – February 2002
- Studio: Larabee East; La Casa Studios; (Los Angeles, California)
- Genre: Soft rock
- Length: 4:11
- Label: Universal Music Latino
- Songwriter: Juanes
- Producers: Juanes; Gustavo Santaolalla

Juanes singles chronology
"A Dios le Pido" (2002)	"Es Por Ti" (2002)	"Mala Gente" (2003)

"Es Por Ti" (English: "Because of You") is a song written and performed by Colombian singer-songwriter Juanes. It's the second radio single from his sophomore studio album Un Día Normal (2002). It was released on 23 September 2002 (see 2002 in music).

The single earned him two Latin Grammy Awards for Song of the Year and Record of the Year. The song is a slow-rock pop ballad that revolves around love towards a romantic partner.

== Chart performance ==
=== Weekly charts ===
Chart (2002–2003)	Peak position
Belgium (Ultratip Bubbling Under Flanders)	10
Belgium (Ultratip Bubbling Under Wallonia)	14
CIS Airplay (TopHit)	68
El Salvador (Notimex)	3
Guatemala (Notimex)	5
Mexico (Monitor Latino)	1
Netherlands (Single Top 100)	97
Russia Airplay (TopHit)	58
US Hot Latin Songs (Billboard)	4
US Latin Pop Airplay (Billboard)	2

=== Year-end charts ===
Chart (2003)	Position
CIS (TopHit)	97
Russia Airplay (TopHit)	76

== Certifications ==
Region	Certification	Certified units/sales
United States (RIAA)	9× Platinum (Latin)	540,000^{‡}
^{‡} Sales+streaming figures based on certification alone.
