= La Vida... Es Un Ratico =

La Vida… Es Un Ratico

Studio album by Juanes
- Released: October 23, 2007
- Studios: Estudio ION (Buenos Aires, Argentina); La Casa y Henson Studios (Hollywood, California); Track Record (North Hollywood, California)
- Genre: Latin pop
- Length: 52:30
- Labels: Universal Columbia; Universal Latino
- Producers: Gustavo Santaolalla; Juanes

Juanes chronology
Mi Sangre (2004)	La Vida… Es Un Ratico (2007)	La Vida... Es Un Ratico: En Vivo (2008)

Singles from La Vida… Es Un Ratico
- 1. "Me Enamora" Released: September 3, 2007; 2. "Gotas de Agua Dulce" Released: December 17, 2007; 3. "Tres" Released: May 5, 2008; 4. "Tú y Yo" Released: June 23, 2008; 5. "Odio por Amor" Released: September 8, 2008; 6. "Hoy Me Voy" Released: December 15, 2008

Professional ratings
Review scores
Source	Rating
Allmusic	link

La Vida... es un Ratico (English: Life... Is a Moment) is the fourth studio album recorded by Colombian singer-songwriter Juanes, which was released by Universal Music Latino on October 23, 2007 (see 2007 in music).

== Album history ==
Juanes has stated that the album is to be completed in Spanish and has a "very Colombian" sound to it. Juanes co-produced this record, working with a two-time Academy Award-winning producer, Gustavo Santaolalla. It has been said that the album has typical Colombian sounds, such as the "guasca," "vallenato," and "cumbia."

When choosing the name for this record, Juanes was inspired by a conversation he had with his mother, who told him to "Not worry, because life is just a moment." Following what that phrase means, Juanes thought of creating an album remembering that life passes you by in a blink of an eye and concentrating more on his family and beloved beings.

The first single "Me Enamora" was released on September 3, 2007, to the media and online stores, such as iTunes and reached number one in 19 countries. The second single is "Gotas de Agua Dulce".

This album won the Latin Grammy Award for Album of the Year and Best Male Pop Vocal Album; and the lead single "Me Enamora" also received three awards for Record of the Year, Song of the Year and Best Short Form Music Video in the 9th Annual Latin Grammy Awards. At the 51st Annual Grammy Awards this album won for Grammy Award for Best Latin Pop Album.

This album was reissued on September 15, 2008, with three new songs and eight tracks recorded live on his tour in the United States and Europe. The special edition will include also a DVD with new footage from Juanes' tour and the music videos the three singles released already. The confirmed new tracks for this re-edition are: "Falsas Palabras" (recorded with Gustavo Santaolalla in late 2007) and "Odio por Amor" (the first single from this revamped edition).

== Chart performance ==
In the United States, the album debuted at number 13 on the Billboard 200 album chart, selling about 47,000 copies in its first week. It debuted at number two in Argentina and number one on US Top Latin Charts.

== Track listing ==
Standard Edition

1. "No Creo en el Jamás" – 3:32
2. "Clase de Amor" – 3:53
3. "Me Enamora" – 3:14
4. "Hoy Me Voy" – 3:23
5. "La Vida es un Ratico" – 4:05
6. "Gotas de Agua Dulce" – 3:11
7. "La Mejor Parte de Mí" – 3:42
8. "Minas Piedras" – 4:05
9. "Tú y Yo" – 4:26
10. "Báilala" – 3:31
11. "Difícil" – 4:01
12. "Tres" – 3:25
13. "Bandera de Manos" – 4:06

Bonus tracks

14. "Bandera de Manos"
15. "La Camisa Negra" (Australian Edition)
16. "Falsas Palabras" (iTunes Pre-Order)
17. "Dove Le Pietre Sono Mine (Minas Piedras)" (featuring Negrita) Italian Re-Release
18. "Me Enamora" (Full Phatt Remix) Japan Re-Release
19. "Tres" (Full Phatt Remix) Japan Re-Release

== 2008 re-release ==
1. "Odio por Amor"
2. "Falsas Palabras"
3. "No Creo en el Jamás"
4. "Clase de Amor"
5. "Me Enamora"
6. "Hoy Me Voy"
7. "La Vida es un Ratico"
8. "Gotas de Agua Dulce"
9. "La Mejor Parte de Mí"
10. "Minas Piedras" (featuring Andrés Calamaro)
11. "Tú y Yo"
12. "Báilala"
13. "Difícil"
14. "Tres"
15. "Bandera de Manos" (featuring Campino)
16. "Bandera de Manos"
17. "Hoy Me Voy" (featuring Colbie Caillat)

== DVD track listing ==
1. Juanes: A Musical Journey (Director's Cut)
2. Behind the Cameras of "Me Enamora"
3. La Vida... Es Un Ratico (interview with Juanes)

== Personnel ==
Performers and musicians

- Guitar/Voice/Keyboards: Juanes
- Drums: Victor Indrizzo
- Bass: Fernando "Toby" Tobón
- Drums and Accordion: Chelito de Castro
- Percussion: Felipe Alzate

Technical

- Produced by: Gustavo Santaolalla and Juanes
- Associate producer: Aníbal Kerpel
- Executive producer: Adrian Sosa
- Recorded at: Las Montañas de Medellín, Colombia, La Casa and Henson Studios
- Engineer at "Las Montañas de Medellín": Juanes
- Engineer at "La Casa": Anibal Kerpel
- Engineer at "Henson": Thom Russo
- Engineer for Andrés Calamaro vocals: Jorge Da Silva at Ion Studios.
- Strings recorded at: Track Record, North Hollywood by Steve Churchyard
- Strings arranged, orchestrated and conducted by David Campbell
- Mixing at: Hit Factory by Thom Russo
- Mastering: Tom Baker at Prevision Mastering
- Design: Eduardo Chavarín and Luis Díaz
- Graphic production: Carolina Larrea and Eduardi Chavarín
- Photography: www.raulhiguera.com
- Cover: René Shenduda

== Charts ==
=== Weekly charts ===
Weekly chart performance for La Vida... Es Un Ratico
Chart (2007)	Peak position
Argetinan Albums (CAPIF)	2
Austrian Albums (Ö3 Austria)	24
Belgian Albums (Ultratop Flanders)	74
Belgian Albums (Ultratop Wallonia)	46
Chile	3
Ecuador	3
Dutch Albums (Album Top 100)	20
Finnish Albums (Suomen virallinen lista)	14
French Albums (SNEP)	21
German Albums (Offizielle Top 100)	11
Hungarian Albums (MAHASZ)	37
Portuguese Albums (AFP)	30
Spanish Albums (Promusicae)	1
Swedish Albums (Sverigetopplistan)	60
Swiss Albums (Schweizer Hitparade)	3
Peru	1
US Billboard 200	13
US Top Latin Albums (Billboard)	1
US Latin Pop Albums (Billboard)	1
Venezuela	2

== Certifications and sales ==
Certifications and sales for La Vida... Es Un Ratico
Region	Certification	Certified units/sales
Argentina (CAPIF)	Gold	20,000^{^}
Central America (CFC)	Platinum	10,000
Colombia	Platinum	150,000
Mexico (AMPROFON)	Gold	50,000^{^}
Mexico Digital downloads	—	250,000
Romania	Gold	
Russia (NFPF)	Gold	10,000^{*}
Spain (Promusicae)	2× Platinum	160,000^{^}
Switzerland (IFPI Switzerland)	Gold	15,000^{^}
United States	—	300,000
^{*} Sales figures based on certification alone.^{^} Shipments figures based on certification alone.
