= 2003 in Latin music =

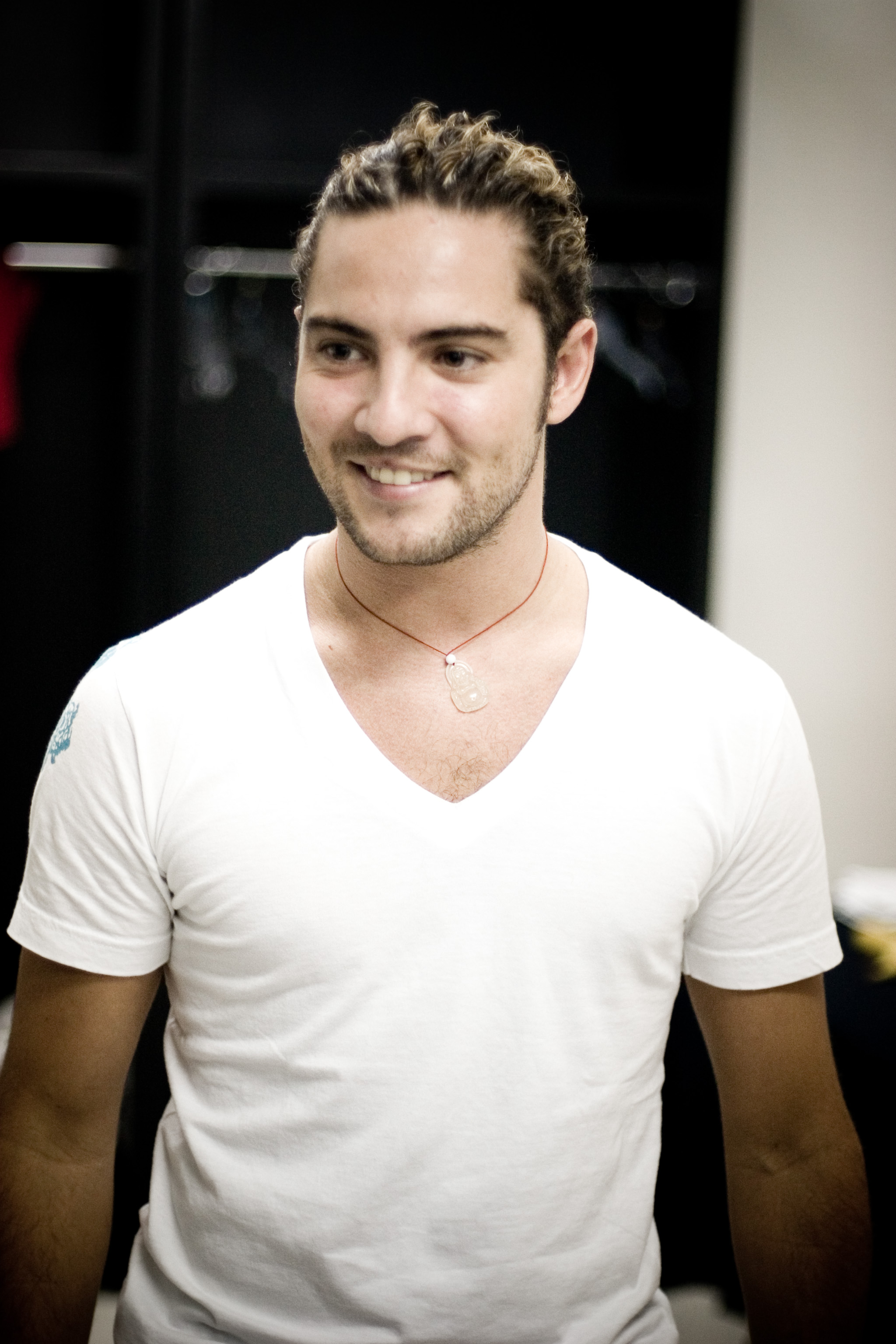
Spanish singer David Bisbal won the Latin Grammy Award for Best New Artist.

This is a list of notable events in Latin music (i.e., Spanish- and Portuguese-speaking music from Latin America, Europe, and the United States) that took place in 2003.

== Bands formed ==
- Abraskadabra
- Akwid
- Álex Ubago
- Ana Cristina
- Andy & Lucas
- Ángel Garay
- Big Pepe
- Contagious
- Conjunto Pirámide
- Daniel René
- Isabela
- Iván Díaz
- Jae P
- Jimena
- Jorge Correa
- Juan Tavares
- K-Paz de la Sierra
- La Zurda
- Las Niñas
- Linda Bandry
- Luna Llena
- Madame Saatan
- Maria Rita
- Nadia López
- Natalia Lafourcade
- Puerto Raíces
- Punto y Aparte
- Roselyn Sánchez
- Sandra
- Santos Diablitos
- Seaxappeal
- Son Callejero
- Temblor del Norte
- Universales del Norte
- Úrsula Sol
- Víctor García
- Violento
- Yahir

== Bands reformed ==
- Bronco

== Events ==
- September 3 — The 4th Annual Latin Grammy Awards are held at the American Airlines Arena in Miami, Florida.
  - Juanes is the biggest winner at the award ceremony receiving five awards including Record of the Year and Song of the Year for "Es Por Ti" and Album of the Year for Un Día Normal.
  - David Bisbal wins Best New Artist.
  - Brazilian singer Gilberto Gil is honored as the Latin Recording Academy Person of the Year

== Number-ones albums and singles by country ==
- List of number-one singles of 2003 (Spain)
- List of number-one Billboard Top Latin Albums of 2003
- List of number-one Billboard Hot Latin Songs of 2003

== Awards ==
- 2003 Premio Lo Nuestro
- 2003 Billboard Latin Music Awards
- 2003 Latin Grammy Awards
- 2003 Tejano Music Awards

== Albums released ==
=== First quarter ===
==== January ====
Day	Title	Artist	Genre(s)	Singles	Label
1	Yo Me Llamo Juan	Lebrijano	Flamenco		Ediciones Senador, Flamenco & Duende
1	Infame	Babasónicos	Alternative rock		Discos Popart
3	Cuban Odyssey	Jane Bunnett	Latin jazz, Afro-Cuban jazz, Soundtrack		Blue Note
3	50 Years of Mambo	The Mambo All Stars Orchestra			
5	Chegou a Hora de Recomeçar	CPM 22	Alternative rock, pop rock, punk		Arsenal Music, Abril Music
7	MTV Ao Vivo	Jota Quest	Pop rock		Chaos, Epic
9	Brincadeira Tem Hora	Leandro			
11	La última noche del mundo	Austin TV	Space rock, post rock, indie rock		Grabaxiones Alicia
12	Villa-Lobos Bachianas Brasileiras Nº 4 e Cirandas João	Joao Carlos Assis Brasil			
12	Mundo Verde	Esperança Hermeto Pascoal E Grupo	Contemporary jazz, MPB		Radio Mec
13	Hermanos de Sangre	Viejas	Classic Rock		Discos FMP
14	En Vivo Al Azul Vivo	Los Angeles Azules			
28	Mambo Sinuendo	Manuel Galban and Ry Cooder	Cubano		Nonesuch, Perro Verde
28	Mi Ritmo	Plena Libre	Plena		G.N. Musica, Latin World Entertainment Group
30	Do Cóccix Até o Pescoço	Elza Soares	Samba, MPB		Maianga Discos

==== February ====
Day	Title	Artist	Genre(s)	Singles	Label
4	El Príncipe con Trío	José José			BMG Mexico
4	Frágil	Ana Torroja			Ariola, BMG Spain
7	Perseverancia	Tito Rojas	Salsa	"Cuidala"	Musical Productions
11	No Te lo Vas a Acabar!	Pesado			Warner Music Latina
18	Gracias... Homenaje A Javier Solis	Pablo Montero	Bolero, ranchera		BMG U.S. Latin
25	4	A.B. Quintanilla III Presents Kumbia Kings	Cumbia	"No Tengo Dinero"	King Of Bling Entertainment, EMI Latin
25	Dance and Dense Denso	Molotov	Funk metal, pop rock		Surco Records J.V.
25	En Vivo 30 Aniversario	Raphy Leavitt y la Selecta			
25	Infinito	Oscar D'León	Salsa		Universal Music Latino, RMM Records
25	En El Malecón De La Habana	Juan Formell and Los Van Van	Rumba, salsa		DiscMedi Blau
25	Solo Bolero	Gilberto Santa Rosa	Bolero	"Un Amor Para La Historia"	Sony

==== March ====
Day	Title	Artist	Genre(s)	Singles	Label
4	Songs 4 Worship: En Espanol	Various artists			
11	Niña Amada Mía	Alejandro Fernández	Mariachi	"Niña Amada Mía"	Columbia
18	Buenos Hermanos	Ibrahim Ferrer	Son cubano, salsa, Afro-Cuban		World Circuit
18	Estrella Guía	Alexandre Pires	MPB	"Amame" "Quietemonos La Ropa" "En El Silencio Negro De La Noche" "Bum Bum Bum"	BMG, RCA
25	Y Tenerte Otra Vez	Pepe Aguilar			Universal Music Grp
25	Super Riddim Internacional Vol. 1	El Gran Silencio	Folk, alternative rock, norteno, ska		EMI Latin
25	Los Hombres Calientes Volume 4: Vodou Dance	Los Hombres Calientes			
25	Isla	Mark Levine and the Latin Tinge	Latin jazz		Left Coast Clave
25	Historias	Ivan Díaz			EMI Latin
25	Inesperado	Frankie Negrón	Salsa	"Mi Mulata"	WeaCaribe, Warner Music Latina
27	Presente	Renato Russo	Pop rock	"Mais Uma Vez"	EMI

=== Second quarter ===
==== April ====
Day	Title	Artist	Genre(s)	Singles	Label
1	Homenaje a Las Grandes	Jenni Rivera	Norteño, banda		Univision Records
1	Bonito	Jarabe de Palo	Salsa, flamenco, pop rock, Latin		DRO
1	En Vivo	Los Rieleros del Norte			
8	Milagro	Jaci Velasquez	Ballad, vocal		Sony Discos
8	Pietá	Milton Nascimento	MPB		Warner Music Brasil, WEA
8	Malabaristas do Sinal Vermelho	João Bosco	MPB, samba		Epic
9	Blin Blin Vol. 1	Various Artists	Reggaeton		Blin Blin Music
15	President Alien	Yerba Buena	Afro-Cuban		Razor & Tie
15	Hierbabuena	Los Razos			BMG U.S. Latin
22	Las Canciones... Que Esperabas	Liberación	Cumbia, ballad		Disa
22	Carta de Verano	Joe Veras	Bachata	"Intentalo Tú"	JVN Musical Inc., J&N Records
25	K	Kepa Junkera			EMI, Hispavox, Capitol Music
28	Carlinhos Brown Es Carlito Marrón	Carlinhos Brown	Samba, cumbia, ballad, bossa nova, easy listening		BMG Spain, Ariola
29	Lo Que te Conté Mientras te Hacías la Dormida	La Oreja de Van Gogh	Vocal, ballad		Sony Music, Sony Music
29	Un Poco De Cambio	Eddie Gonzalez	Tejano		Sony Discos
29	Guitarra Mía	Polo Montañez	Son cubano		Evolver

==== May ====
Day	Title	Artist	Genre(s)	Singles	Label
6	El Negro Gangoso	Renacimiento '74	Cumbia		Ramex
6	Soraya	Soraya	Latin Pop	"Casi"	EMI Latin
6	Trumpet Evolution	Arturo Sandoval	Afro-Cuban jazz		Crescent Moon Records, Columbia
6	Caramelito	Rocío Dúrcal	Ballad		Ariola, BMG U.S. Latin
6	Señor Bolero 2	José Feliciano	Bolero	"Lo Que Yo Tuvé Contigo"	Universal Music Latino
13	Tu Amor o Tu Desprecio	Marco Antonio Solís	Regional Mexican	"Tu Amor o Tu Desprecio" "Más Que Tu Amigo"	Fonovisa Records
13	Para Siempre	Eddy Herrera	Merengue	"El Idiota"	J&N Records, Sony Discos
20	Almas del Silencio	Ricky Martin	Latin	"Tal Vez" "Jaleo" "Asignatura Pendiente" "Juramento" "Y Todo Queda en Nada"	Sony Discos
20	La Historia Live	Héctor & Tito	Reggaeton		VI Music
20	Imperio	Los Tucanes de Tijuana			
20	Desde Hoy	Duelo	Norteño		Univision Records
20	¿Qué Sentiras?	Atrapado			
20	Pa' Toda Mi Raza...Eso!	Juan Acuña & El Terror del Norte			
20	Memorias	Grupo Bryndis			
20	Recuerdos	Los Ángeles de Charly			
27	Libertad	La Ley	Pop rock		Warner Music Argentina
27	Si Me Faltas Tu	Jimmy Gonzalez y El Grupo Mazz			
27	La Tercera Es La Vencida... Eso!	Los Terribles del Norte			

==== June ====
Day	Title	Artist	Genre(s)	Singles	Label
3	Conjunto Atardecer	Conjunto Atardecer			
3	9	Eros Ramazzotti	Soft rock, pop rock, AOR, Europop		Ariola, BMG Nederland BV
3	Prohibido Olvidar	Ricardo Montaner	Ballad	"Que Ganas"	Warner Music Latina
5	Historia Sinfonica del Pop Español	Orquestra Simfònica de Barcelona I Nacional de Catalunya	Easy listening		Factoria Autor
6	Piano y Voz	Cesar Camargo Mariano and Pedro Mariano			
10	Proyecto Akwid	Akwid	Afro-Cuban		Univision Records
10	The Last Don	Don Omar	Reggaeton	"Dale Don Dale" "Dile" "Intocable"	Machete Music
10	Ritmo Caliente	Eddie Palmieri	Salsa, Latin jazz		Concord Picante
10	Pina... the Company: Los Mas Duros	Various artists			
10	The Mix	Monchy & Alexandra	Bachata, dance-pop, reggaeton, ballad	"Polo Opuesto"	J&N Records
17	Contemporâneos	Dori Caymmi	MPB		HoriPro Inc.
24	Dejenme Llorar	Yolanda Pérez	Norteño, corrido		Fonovisa Records
24	En el Tiempo	Los Huracanes del Norte	Norteño, Tejano		Univision Records

=== Third quarter ===
==== July ====
Day	Title	Artist	Genre(s)	Singles	Label
1	Quien Iva a Pensar	Jimmy Gonzalez	Tejano		Freddie Records
1	Homenaje a un Amigo	Banda Centenario			
1	Cuatro Caminos	Café Tacuba	Alternative rock		Universal, MCA Records
1	Alondra	Alondra			
1	Conjunto Power	Jaime & Los Chamacos			
1	Naturaleza Sangre	Fito Páez	Pop rock		DBN
5	Ventura	Los Hermanos	Alternative rock, MPB, indie rock		BMG Brasil, Ariola
8	Hasta la Cima del Cielo	Solido	Tejano		Freddie Records
8	Tudo Azul	Velha Guarda da Portela	Samba		Lusafrica
8	Sin Desperdicio	Johnny Ventura	Merengue, salsa		Musical Productions
8	La Motosierra	Los Originales de San Juan			
14	El Pequeño Reloj	Enrique Morente	Flamenco		Virgin, EMI
15	Music for My Peoples	Huey Dunbar	Salsa	"Sin Poderte Hablar"	Sony Discos
15	Siempre Arriba	Bronco: El Gigante de America			
15	Kaya N'Gan Daya: Ao Vivo	Gilberto Gil	MPB		Som Livre, Globo Warner
15	Puras de Rompe y Rasga	Los Horóscopos de Durango	Corrido, cumbia, ranchera		Producciones Canales S.A. De C.V.
22	Confesiones	Obie Bermúdez	Ballad, soft rock	"Antes" "Me Cansé de Ti"	EMI Latin
22	Hola Chicuelos	Plastilina Mosh	Alternative rock		Virgin, Tombola! Recordings
28	Pasado y Presente	Soneros de Verdad presents Rubalcaba			
29	Se Me Hizo Tarde la Vida	Vicente Fernández	Mariachi		Sony Discos
29	Obrigado Brazil	Yo-Yo Ma	Neo-classical, bossa nova		Sony Classical

==== August ====
Day	Title	Artist	Genre(s)	Singles	Label
5	¡Tomala!	Los Tetas	Hip hop, funk		Tocka Discos
5	Belinda	Belinda			
5	En Vivo En El Colón	Orquesta Del Tango De La Ciudad De Buenos Aires			Epsa Music
5	Corazón	Cuisillos de Arturo Macias	Ranchera		Musart
5	El Rancho Grande	El Coyote y su Banda Tierra Santa			
5	Ciudadana	María Estela Monti			
5	El Sonador	Adán Sánchez			
10	Cantor de Cantores	Horacio Guarany	Zamba, Chacarera, Chamamé		GLD Distribuidora S.A.
12	Con Poder	Salvador	Pop rock		Word, Curb Records, Warner Bros. Records
16	Nuestro Destino Estaba Escrito	Intocable	Norteño		EMI Latin
19	Decide Tú	Conjunto Primavera			
19	Diva	Ivy Queen	Reggaeton	"Tuya Soy" "Guillaera" "Subelo"	Real Music, Inc.
19	Ni de Aqui Ni de Alla	Jae-P			Univision Records
19	En Vivo, Vol. 1	Los Acosta			
19	De Bohemia con Lupillo Rivera	Lupillo Rivera			
26	Sincero	Chayanne	Salsa, vocal, ballad	"Un Siglo Sin Ti" "Cuidarte el Alma" "Sentada Aqui en Mi Alma"	Columbia, Sony Music
26	A Puro Fuego	Olga Tañón	Merengue	"Cuando Tu No Estás"	Warner Music Latina
26	Mas Flow	Luny Tunes and Noriega	Reggaeton		Flow Music, Universal Music & Video Distribution
26	Música Universal	Truco & Zaperoko	Jibaro, salsa		Libertad Records
26	Frijoles Romanticos	Frijoles Romanticos			
26	Live at the Blue Note	Michel Camilo, Charles Flores, and Horacio Hernandez	Post bop, Latin jazz		Telarc, Telarc Jazz
26	Birds of a Feather	Caribbean Jazz Project	Afro-Cuban jazz		Concord Picante
26	Jíbaro Hasta el Hueso: Mountain Music of Puerto Rico	Ecos de Borinquen	Jibaro		Smithsonian Folkways
26	Canto Do Rio Jovino	Santos Neto Quinteto	Latin jazz		Liquid City
28	Regalo del Alma	Celia Cruz	Salsa, Afro-Cuban	"Rie y Llora" "Ella Tiene Fuego"	Sony Discos

==== September ====
Day	Title	Artist	Genre(s)	Singles	Label
2	No Es lo Mismo	Alejandro Sanz	Acoustic, soft rock, Latin, pop rock	"No Es lo Mismo" "Regálame la Silla Donde Te Esperé" "Eso" "He Sido Tan Feliz Contigo" "Try To Save Your S'ong"	WEA
9	Out of Sight!	Poncho Sanchez	Latin jazz, salsa, fusion, Afro-Cuban jazz		Concord Picante
9	Barbarito Torres	Barbarito Torres	Afro-Cuban, son cubano		Havana Caliente
9	Necesito un Amor	Andy Andy	Bachata	"Voy a Tener Que Olvidarte" "Necesito un Amor"	Sony Discos
9	Vuelve	Sólido			
9	Maria Rita	Maria Rita	Música popular brasileira		Warner Music Brasil
14	We Could Make Such Beautiful Music Together	Bebo Valdés and Federico Britos			Calle 54 Records, Ariola, BMG Spain
16	Tequila y Ron... A Tribute to José Alfredo Jiménez	Ismael Miranda			
16	New Conceptions	Chucho Valdés	Latin jazz		Blue Note
16	Ninel Conde	Ninel Conde			Universal
16	Noite Clara	Ricardo Silveira	MPB		Adventure Music
18	Canto	El Pele and Vicente Amigo	Flamenco		Ariola, BMG Spain
23	Indomable	Bronco	Cumbia, Conjunto, Norteno, Ballad		Ariola
23	Coming Up	Ozomatli	Latin, Funk		Concord Records
23	Te Atraparé...Bandido	Ana Bárbara	Ranchera		Fonovisa
23	Los Homerun-es	Daddy Yankee	Reggaeton		Machete Music
30	33	Luis Miguel	Vocal, ballad	"Te Necesito" "Un Te Amor" "Vuelve"	WEA, Warner Music Argentina
30	Amar Es	Cristian Castro	Ballad	"No Hace Falta" "Te Llamé"	RCA, BMG Chile
30	De Durango a Chicago	Grupo Montez de Durango			
30	Censurado	Ranking Stone	Reggaeton		VI Music
30	Despues de Todo	Milagro	Ranchera, norteno, cumbia		Fonosound
30	Montame	Bobby Pulido	Tejano		Universal Music Latino
30	Van Van Live at Miami Arena	Los Van Van	Salsa, Timba, Cubano		Havana Caliente, Pimienta Records

=== Fourth quarter ===
==== October ====
Day	Title	Artist	Genre(s)	Singles	Label
7	Soundances	Diego Urcola	Post bop, Latin jazz		Sunnyside
7	Furia Alacranera	Alacranes Musical			Univision Records
14	Magos, espadas y rosas	Rata Blanca	Heavy Metal		Polydor, PolyGram
14	En Vivo: Juntos Por Ultima Vez	Vicente Fernández and Alejandro Fernández			
14	Abriendo Caminos	Los Rieleros del Norte			
14	Gargolas, Vol. 4: The Best Reggaeton	Gargolas	Reggaeton		VI Music
21	De Viaje	Sin Bandera	Salsa, tango, vocal, ballad	"Que Lloro"	Sony Music, Sony Music
21	Canto a Mi Idolo... Frankie Ruiz	Jerry Rivera	Salsa	"Mi Libertad" "Puerto Rico"	BMG, Ariola
21	Inocente de Ti	Juan Gabriel	Ballad, Soundtrack		Ariola
21	Por Ti	Banda El Recodo De Cruz Lizarraga			Fonovisa Records
21	Titere en Tus Manos/El Invicto	Ramón Ayala y Sus Bravos del Norte			
22	Balacobaco	Rita Lee	Pop rock, MPB		Som Livre
27	Isla Menor	Raimundo Amador			Universal
28	Live en el Valle	Jimmy González and El Grupo Mazz			
28	Abrazar la vida	Luis Fonsi	Salsa, ballad	"Quien Te Dijo Eso?" "Abrazar la Vida" "Por Ti Podria Morir"	Universal Music Latino
28	Elevado	Dante Spinetta			Polydor, Universal
28	Indetenible	Los Toros Band	Merengue	"Loca Conmigo" "Si Tu Estuvieras"	Universal Music Latino

==== November ====
Day	Title	Artist	Genre(s)	Singles	Label
1	Momento Especial	Ataíde & Alexandre	Sertanejo		Atração Fonográfica
4	Con Orgullo Por Herencia	Pepe Aguilar			Univision Records
4	Sí	Julieta Venegas	Latin, pop rock, synth-pop	"Andar Conmigo" "Lento" "Algo Está Cambiando" "Oleada"	BMG Mexico, Ariola
4	Serrat Sinfónico	Joan Manuel Serrat			Ariola, BMG Argentina
4	Special Request	Maestro	Reggaetón, Hip Hop		
11	Dando Cocotazos	Sir Speedy	Reggaetón		
13	O Silêncio Q Precede o Esporro	O Rappa			WEA Music
14	Dulce y salado	Ana Gabriel	Vocal		Sony Music
14	Divorcio	Julio Iglesias	Vocal		Sony Discos, Columbia, Columbia
18	Por Ti	Ednita Nazario	Ballad		Sony Discos
18	En Honor a la Verdad	Vico C			EMI Latin
18	Sur O No Sur	Kevin Johansen + The Nada	Folk, pop rock		Los Años Luz Discos
18	Canciones del Alma de Marco Antonio Solís	Los Tri-O			Prisma Records, Sony Discos
18	Atlas	Kinky	Alternative rock, bossa nova, Latin, disco		Nettwerk America
18	Tito Nieves canta con el Conjunto Clásico: 25 Aniversario Recuerdos	Tito Nieves	Son cubano, salsa		WeaCaribe
18	Clube Carnavalesco Inocentes em Progresso	Ivete Sangalo	Axe, MPB, Reggae		Universal Music, Mercury
18	Love & Hate	Aventura	Bachata	"Hermanita"	Premium Latin Music
20	Schubert – Fauré	Trío Argentino			
24	El Vivo de León	León Gieco	Folk rock		EMI
25	Seranata	Manny Manuel			
25	Un Nuevo Capítulo	La Tropa F			Freddie Records
25	Cosmotron	Skank	Psychedelic rock, pop rock		Epic
25	El Regalo	Tatiana			Disa Niños
26	Acústico MTV	Zeca Pagodinho	Samba		Universal Music, Mercury
26	Só Para Baixinhos 4	Xuxa	Educational		Som Livre, Xuxa Produções
Unknown	Como Estão Vocês?	Titãs	Pop rock	"Enquanto Houver Sol", "Provas de Amor"	BMG, Ariola

==== December ====
Day	Title	Artist	Genre(s)	Singles	Label
1	Inevitável	Bruno & Marrone			BMG, RCA
2	Todas as Coisas e Eu	Gal Costa			Indie Records, Som Livre
2	Noturno Copacabana	Guinga	MPB		Velas
9	Hombres de Honor	Grupo Manía	Bomba, guaracha, salsa, plena	"Sube, Sube" "Telefono"	Universal Music Latino
9	Sigo Siendo Romántico	Mickey Taveras	Bachata, merengue, salsa		Karen Records
15	Sobre Nós 2 e O Resto do Mundo	Roberto Frejat	Pop rock		Wea Music
15	Admirável Chip Novo	Pitty	Alternative rock, Hard rock		Deskdisc
15	Jeitão de Caboclo	Liu & Léu			
22	É Caco de Vidro Puro	Cascabulho	MPB		Via Som Music

=== Unknown ===
Title	Artist	Genre(s)	Singles	Label
Andy & Lucas	Andy & Lucas	Ballad		Ariola, BMG Spain
31 Minutos	31 Minutos	Story, Soundtrack		Aplaplac, La Oreja
Censurados	Los Aldeanos	Hip hop		
La culpa	Los Bunkers	Alternative rock, folk rock, psychedelic rock, power pop		Columbia
Lágrimas Negras	Bebo Valdés and Diego el Cigala	Flamenco, Bolero, Latin jazz		Calle 54 Records, Ariola, BMG Spain
Babylon	Walter Ferguson	Calypso		Papaya Music
Jobim Sinfônico	São Paulo State Symphony Orchestra	Classical music		Biscoito Fino

== Best-selling records ==
=== Best-selling albums ===
The following is a list of the top 10 best-selling Latin albums in the United States in 2003, according to Billboard.

Rank	Album	Artist
1	Un Día Normal	Juanes
2	Almas del Silencio	Ricky Martin
3	Grandes Éxitos	Shakira
4	Revolución de Amor	Maná
5	4	Kumbia Kings
6	Las Ketchup	Las Ketchup
7	Santo Pecado	Ricardo Arjona
8	Mambo Sinuendo	Manuel Galban and Ry Cooder
9	Hits Mix	Celia Cruz
10	Regalo del Alma	Celia Cruz

=== Best-performing songs ===
The following is a list of the top 10 best-performing Latin songs in the United States in 2003, according to Billboard.

Rank	Single	Artist
1	"Tal Vez"	Ricky Martin
2	"Fotografía"	Juanes featuring Nelly Furtado
3	"Una Vez Más"	Conjunto Primavera
4	"El Problema"	Ricardo Arjona
5	"Amame"	Alexandre Pires
6	"Mariposa Traicionera"	Maná
7	"Así Es La Vida"	Olga Tañón
8	"Que Me Quedes Tú"	Shakira
9	"Sedúceme"	La India
10	"Sueña"	Intocable

== Deaths ==
- January 17 – Jaime Vivanco, Chilean jazz pianist and composer
- January 24 – Sabotage, Brazilian rapper
- January 25 – Jorge "Lobito" Martínez, Paraguayan guitarist and composer of folk music, 50 (murdered)
- February 1 – Mongo Santamaría, Cuban Latin jazz percussionist, 85
- April 9 – Marcelo Berbel, Argentine folk composer
- April 13 – Raúl Shaw Moreno, Bolivian performer and composer of boleros
- May 15 – Abilio Bermúdez, Ecuadorian composer
- June 21 – Jorge Pinchevsky Argentine classical, tango, and rock violinist
- June 30 – María Gabriela Epumer, Argentine rock singer-songwriter
- July 1 – Chicho Sánchez Ferlosio, Spanish singer-songwriter, 63
- July 5
  - Bebu Silvetti, Argentine composer and arranger
  - Fernando Arbex, Spanish rock drummer
- July 13 – Compay Segundo, Cuban musician and member of the Buena Vista Social Club
- July 16 – Celia Cruz, Cuban salsa singer, 77
- August 5 – Tite Curet Alonso, Puerto Rican salsa composer, 77
- September 1 – Eulalio "Piporro" González, Mexican actor and singer-songwriter
- November 15 – Antonio Tormo, Argentine folk singer
- November 30 – Eskroto, Spanish rock singer
- December 2 – Jacinto Pebe Pueyrredón, Peruvian folk singer
