= 2013 Viña del Mar International Song Festival =

Chilean musical event

- Directed by: Álex Hernández
- Presented by: Rafael Araneda; Eva Gómez
- Country of origin: Chile

Production
- Producer: Pablo Morales
- Production locations: Viña del Mar, Chile
- Running time: 270 minutes

Original release
- Network: Chilevisión
- Release: February 24 – March 1, 2013

The Viña del Mar International Song Festival 2013 was held from February 24, 2013 through Friday March 1, 2013. The musical event was broadcast via Chilean TV channel Chilevisión. The hosts of the event were Rafael Araneda and Eva Gómez.

The event was broadcast in Chile via Chilevisión and Chilevisión HD, and internationally via A&E for Latin America, TV Azteca for Mexico and Paravisión in Paraguay.

== Development ==
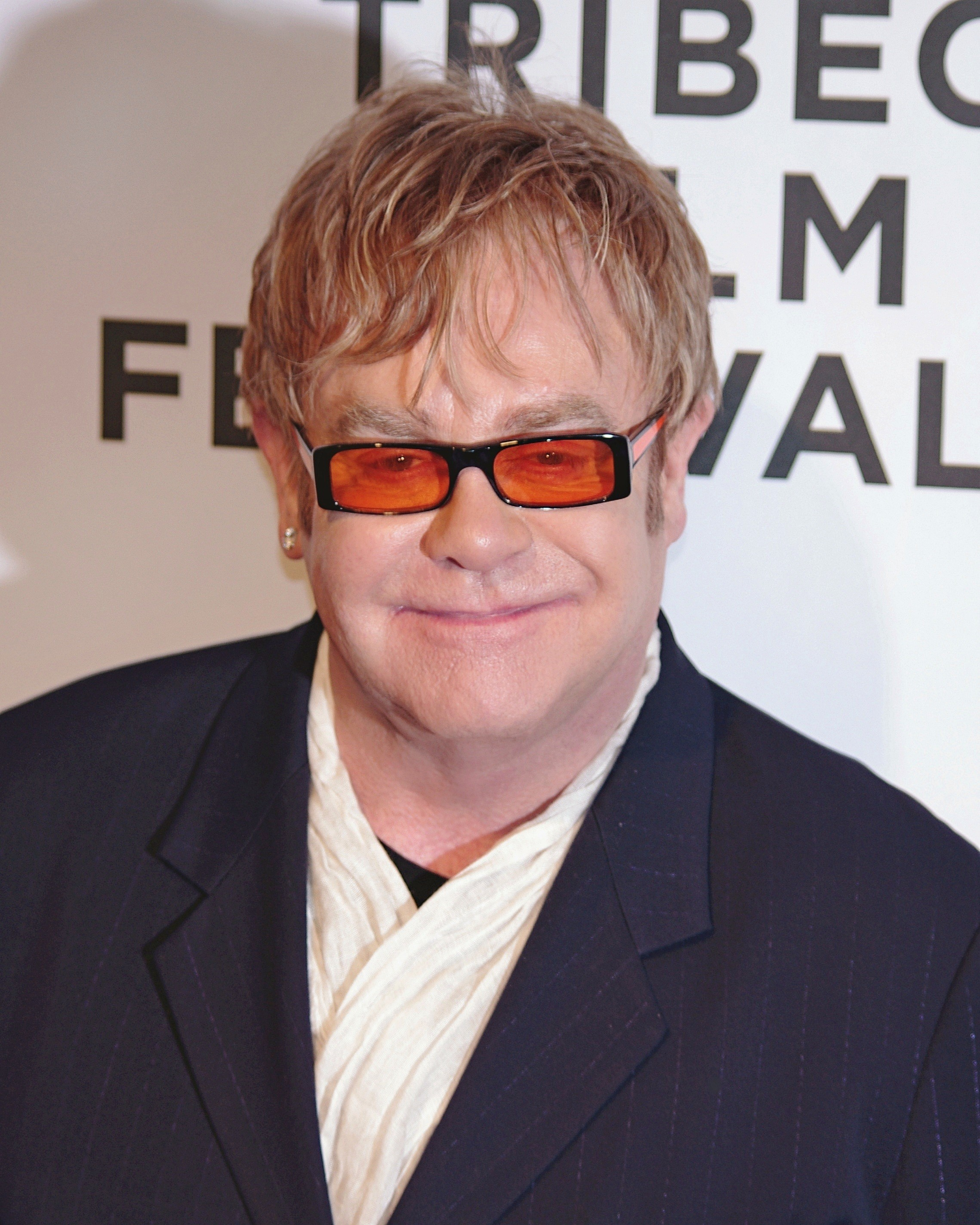
Elton John for first time will be performing in the festival.

The musical performers for the main show were announced on August 17, 2012. These included the Chilean acts 31 Minutos and Los Prisioneros former front man Jorge González. Urban and Reggaeton musician Daddy Yankee, who celebrates a huge success this year in the country with hits like "Limbo", "Lovumba" and "Pasarela", all of which were top 5 in Chilean charts. Another artist presented was Spanish Miguel Bosé. Miguel was promoting his latest album titled Papitwo, which includes the song "Aire Soy" with Ximena Sariñana. This song had moderate success on the national charts, peaking inside the top 20. Also confirmed as part of the judging panel was Mexican singer Gloria Trevi. On August 29, 2012, the municipality and Chilevisión also confirmed the band Maná as part of the show, performing live for the third time at this venue. The last time they appeared was in 2003.

On September 7, 2012, new musical acts were confirmed to perform live in the show, including the Jonas Brothers, who will reunite to perform after a career hiatus. The Chilean Francisca Valenzuela will join the judging panel, as well as perform in the main show. She had a successful year with her album Buen Soldado certified gold in Chile and hit singles topping the charts like "Quiero Verte Más" and "Buen Soldado". Romeo Santos will return, this time on his own, after his debut on this stage with his band Aventura in 2011. Also announced were the tropical sensation La Sonora de Tommy Rey, and the humoristic shows by Memo Bunke, Los Atletas de La Risa and Hermógenes con H. On September 29, 2012, Sir Elton John was confirmed for the festival. This marks his first time in this show, and he is considered to be one of the most important artists scheduled to perform for the event this year. New Spanish artist Pablo Alborán was also announced as a judge for the competition. He is known for huge pop hits like the song "Solamente Tu" which peaked at number 2 in the Chilean charts the past year.

The latest artists confirmed were the Argentinian band Los Autenticos Decadentes and Reggaeton duo Wisin & Yandel. They have one of the hottest tracks of the summer, "Algo Me Gusta de Ti", which is enjoying heavy radio airplay. Both of them are scheduled to perform in the last day of the festival.

Day 2 of the festival, featuring performers Romeo Santos and Daddy Yankee, was the first night sold out after ticket sales opened.

=== Stage ===
The Preparations for the event include aspects such as television broadcasting and stage design. The production and features that have defined the stage by Madis, with a bet that appeals to nostalgia and focus on the public. "The closeness to the people is crucial, and will happen through cameras in the gallery, social networking integration and tell the story of the contest, these are some of the challenges we have set ourselves," says Álex Hernández, director of the festival. To tell the story will be a projection of the former led bandshell. "The digital reconstruction of the bandshell is something protagonist, is a great way walking about 150 meters, maneuver, i.e. movement and interaction. They want to appeal to something nostalgic, "says Marcelo Rojas, director of Madis, the company in charge of stage design.

The scenario also includes a screen of 200 square meters, the largest that has been installed at a show in Chile, which will occupy the entire bottom, plus 150 meters side shields. "It is large, in order to give content to the music parallels besides the visual of each artist and to generate the skills and Festival Overture," says Hernandez. Another novelty is the construction of a place to the jury on the stage, right beside viewed from the front, in one of the walkways. "They assessed from above and be exposed in the show, being part of the show," adds the director.

Along with this, for the 2013 version of the event was removed near the gallery platform was installed this year and where the animators Eva Gómez and Rafael Araneda interacted with the public. Instead they installed cameras that record what happens to the audience, that will make images of any person in the foreground.

Regarding the technical elements, including this year's challenges include synchronization of everything from scenic aspects to lighting, to sound. The ultimate goal is that the telecast is of better bill, and that the audience at the Quinta Vergara live an international experience, indicated from the organization. "The idea is that the technology is at the service of emotions," said Hernandez. Meanwhile, Marcelo Rojas, explains: "It is mixing technology with scenic elements themselves, creating a new design. We use digital elements, via video, to enhance the scene. The idea is that everything is more theatrical. "

== Red carpet ==
A launch event was realized on February 22, 2013, in Casino Viña del Mar with a long red carpet in which celebrities, artists and festival participants walked, this was broadcast via Chilevisión in prime time with interviews and a Glam Cam 360°.

== Confirmed performers ==
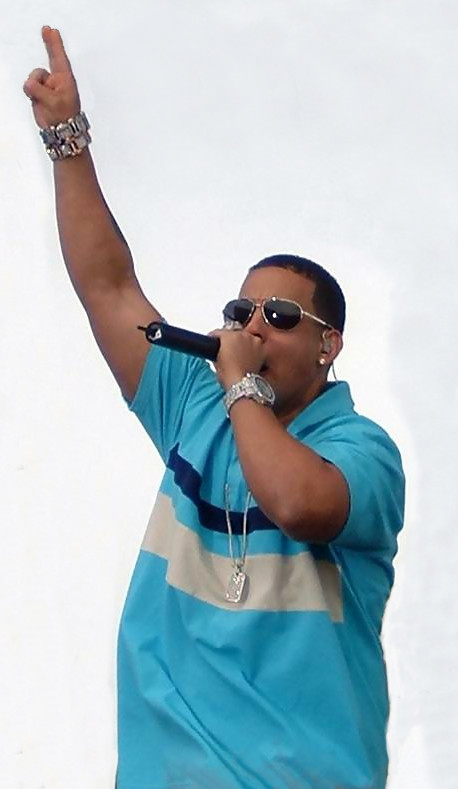
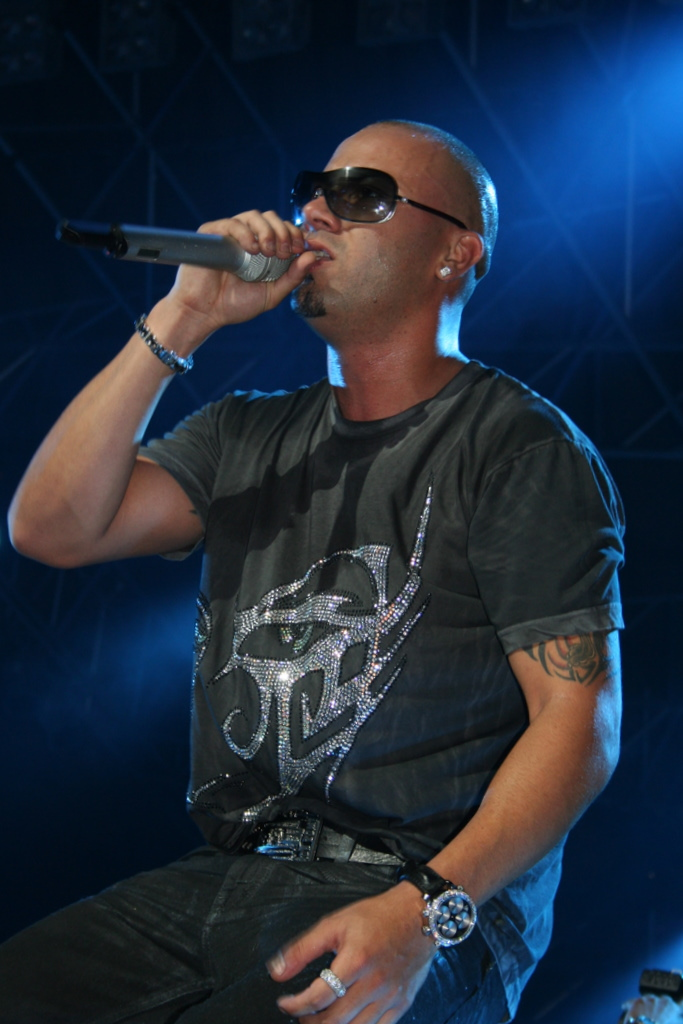
Chart-toppers Daddy Yankee (left) and Wisin of Wisin & Yandel (right) are one of the hottest acts of the festival.
- 31 Minutos
- Francisca Valenzuela
- Jorge González
- La Sonora de Tommy Rey
- Miguel Bosé
- Pablo Alborán
- Chino & Nacho
- Daddy Yankee
- Romeo Santos
- Albert Hammond
- Elton John
- Jonas Brothers
- Maná
- Gloria Trevi
- Wisin & Yandel
- Los Auténticos Decadentes
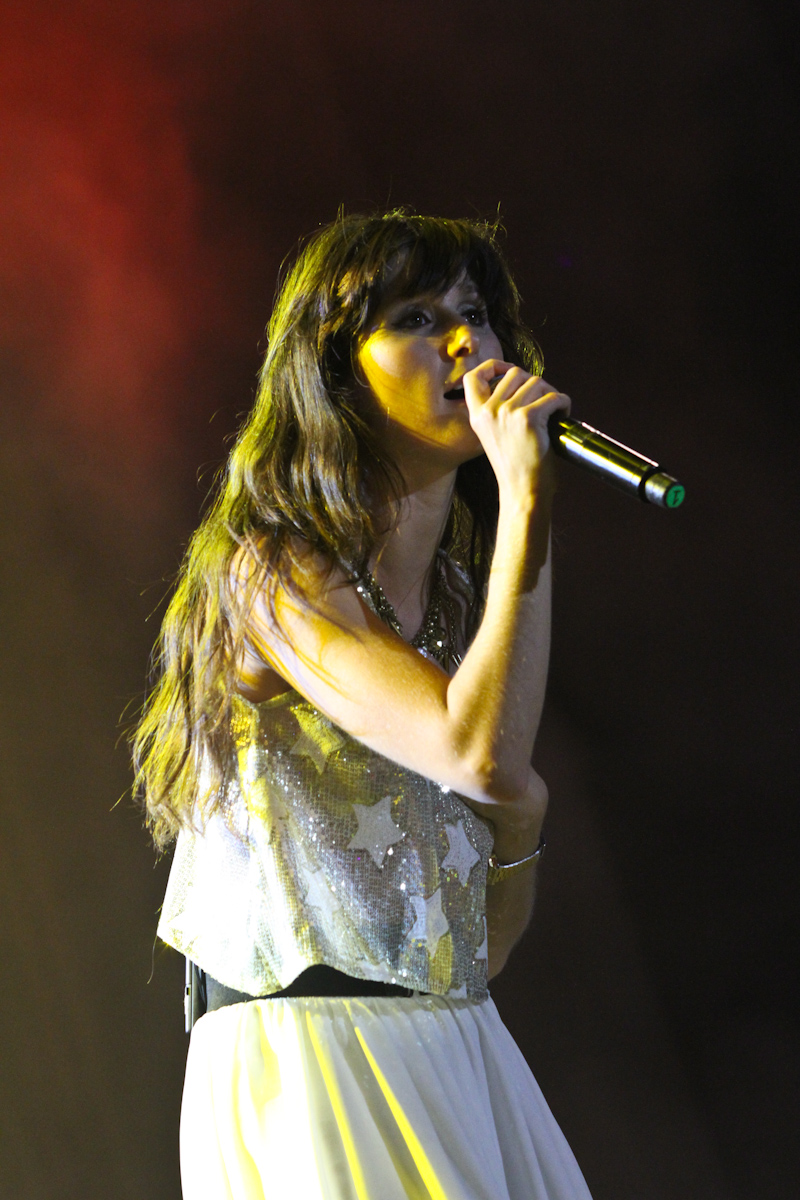
Chilean Francisca Valenzuela (left) and Spanish Pablo Alborán (right) are one of the judges and performing acts.

== Judges ==
- Mario Mutis
- Roberto Artiagoitía "Rumpy"
- Matías del Río
- Francisca Merino
- Francisca Valenzuela
- Magaly León ^{[A]}
- Albert Hammond
- Gloria Trevi
- Inés Sainz
- Pablo Alborán

== Chronology ==
=== Day 1 ===
Artist	Show/Songs Performed	Notes	Recognitions	Rating
World Circus; Tito Beltrán with Patricia Cifuentes	● "La Traviata"	Overture of the musical event. The hosts entrance was in an escene of classic ballet inspired by the musical La traviata. The entire opening was dedicated to the victims of the huge fire occurred in Valparaíso last week.		28.9 Viewers: 3 million
Maná	● "Oye Mi Amor" ● "De Pies a Cabeza" ● "Lluvia al Córazón" ● "Manda Una Señal" ● "El Verdadero Amor Perdona" ● "Bendita Tu Luz" ● "Mariposa Traicionera" ● "Déjame Entrar" ● "Clavado En Un Bar" ● "Me Vale" ● "Te Lloré Un Rio" ● "Eres Mi Religión" ● "Se Me Olvidó Otra Vez" ● "Vivir Sin Aire" ● "En El Muelle De San Blás" ● "Rayando El Sol" ● "Labios Compartidos" ● "Corazón Espinado" ● "Cómo Te Deseo"	The last time that they have performed was in 2003, ten years ago and this is the third time in the festival. The songs "Te Lloré Un Rio", "Eres Mi Religión" and "Se Me Olvidó Otra Vez" were performed in acoustic.	● Silver Torch ● Golden Torch ● Silver Seagull ● Golden Seagull	28.9 Viewers: 3 million
Hermógenes Con H	● Humoristic routine	This was the highest audience moment of the night.	● Silver Torch ● Golden Torch	28.9 Viewers: 3 million
Chino & Nacho	● "Bebé Bonita" ● "Tu Angelito" ● "Dame Un Besito" ● "Felicidad" ● "Lo Que No Sabes Tu" ● "La Vida Es Bella" ● "Mi Niña Bonita" ● Song for Chile ● "El Poeta" ● "Regálame un Muack" ● "Don Juan"	During their show, they sang a cover of Chilean reggae group Gondwana's "Felicidad" and an unknown song dedicated to Chilean fans.	● Golden Torch	28.9 Viewers: 3 million

=== Day 2 ===
Artist	Show/Songs Performed	Notes	Recognitions	Rating
Romeo Santos	● "You" ● "La Diabla" ● "Malevo" ● "Por Un Segundo" ● "Que Se Mueran" ● "Su Veneno" ● "Mi Corazoncito" ● "Los Infieles" ● "Debate De 4" ● "Dile Al Amor" ● "Mi Santa" ● "Llévame Contigo" ● "La Curita" ● "Noche de Sexo" ● "La Pelicula" ● "Enséñame a Olvidar" ● "Todavía Me Amas" ● "Obsesión" ● "Rival" ● "Angelito" ● "El Malo" ● "Promise"	Santos back to the stage this time in his own, after his debut in this stage with his band Aventura in 2011, from his band he sang various tracks, including "Por Un Segundo", "Su Veneno", Mi Corazoncito, among others. He invited to some guys of the audience to sing "Debate De 4" along, the loudest applause of the three participants, Santos gave 1000 dollars. The show had a gypsy interlude when Santos changed his clothes. He also performed the song "Noche de Sexo" by Wisin & Yandel.	● Silver Torch ● Golden Torch ● Silver Seagull ● Golden Seagull	31.8 Viewers: 3.2 million
Los Atletas de la Risa	● Humoristic routine	Their routine was evidently censored.	● Silver Torch ● Golden Torch ● Silver Seagull ● Golden Seagull	31.8 Viewers: 3.2 million
Daddy Yankee	● "Lovumba" ● "Pose" ● "Lo Que Pasó, Pasó" ● "La Despedida" ● "Descontrol" ● "Rompe" ● "Ven Conmigo" ● "Limbo" ● "Perros Salvajes" ● "Llegamos A La Disco" ● "Somos de Calle" ● "¿Qué Tengo Que Hacer?" ● "Pasarela" ● "Llamado de Emergencia" ● "Street Dancer" ● "Hasta Abajo" ● "No Es Culpa Mía" ● "Gasolina" ● "Ella Me Levantó" ● "Machucando" ● "El Ritmo No Perdona (Prende)"	He changed the lyrics of "Somos de Calle" to honored Chile. During one of the interludes, he used the song "Gangnam Style" by PSY and his own song "Machete" with a sample of "Danza Kuduro" by Don Omar.	● Silver Torch ● Golden Torch ● Silver Seagull ● Golden Seagull	31.8 Viewers: 3.2 million

=== Day 3 ===
Artist	Show/Songs Performed	Notes	Recognitions	Rating
Miguel Bosé	● "Mirarte" ● "Duende" ● "Nena" ● "Aire Soy" ● "Te Diré" ● "Morir de Amor" ● "Don Diablo" ● "Creo En Ti" ● "Amiga" ● "Linda" ● "Puede Que" ● "Sevilla" ● "Bambú" ● "Nada Particular" ● "Morena Mía" ● "Como Un Lobo" ● "Amante Bandido" ● "Te Amaré"	He sang "Duende" with an electronic base and since "Te Dire" to "Creo En Ti" in acoustic. Pablo Alborán was invited to sing with him in "Puede Que". In the song "Morena Mía" makes a surprise appearance Francisca Valenzuela singing along. Bosé with emotion receives a Golden Seagull. "Amante Bandido" was performed in an extended electronic remix.	● Silver Torch ● Golden Torch ● Silver Seagull ● Golden Seagull	25.8 Viewers: 2.6 million
Nancho Parra	● Humoristic routine		● Silver Torch ● Golden Torch ● Silver Seagull ● Golden Seagull	25.8 Viewers: 2.6 million
Jonas Brothers	● "Paranoid" ● "Still in Love with You" ● "BB Good" ● "Last Time Around" ● "That's Just the Way we Roll" ● "Play my Music" ● "Give Love a Try" ● "Gotta Find You" ● "Let's Go" ● "Just in Love" ● "Who I Am" ● "Fly with Me" ● "Weeding Bells" ● "Don't You Worry Child" ● "Hello Beautiful" ● "We Are Young" ● "Lovebug" ● "SOS" ● "When You Look Me in the Eyes" ● "Hold On" ● "Burnin' Up"	The show is basically the same set list of their 2012/2013 World Tour which includes their biggest hits and two covers, "Don't You Worry Child" by Swedish House Mafia and "We Are Young" by fun.	● Silver Torch ● Golden Torch ● Silver Seagull ● Golden Seagull	25.8 Viewers: 2.6 million

=== Day 4 ===
Artist	Show/Songs Performed	Notes	Recognitions	Rating
31 Minutos	● "Ratoncitos" ● "Tangananica, Tangananá" ● "Rin Raja" ● "Mi Muñeca Me Habló" ● "Doggy Style" ● "Mi Castillo de Arena Blanca Con Vista Al Mar" ● "Mr. Guantecillo ● "Señora, Devuélvame La Pelota, O Sino, No se Que Hare" ● "Objecion Denegada" ● "Diente Blanco, No Te Vayas" ● "Maguito Explosivo" ● "Bailan Sin Cesar" ● "El Dinosaurio Anacleto ● "Boing, Boing, Boing" ● ● ●	The show started with an instrumental of "Yo Nunca Vi TV".	● Silver Torch ● Golden Torch ● Silver Seagull ● Golden Seagull	31.0 Viewers: 3.1 million
Bastián Paz	● Humoristic routine		● Silver Torch ● Golden Torch ● Silver Seagull ● Golden Seagull	31.0 Viewers: 3.1 million
Francisca Valenzuela	● "Buen Soldado" ● "Quiero Verte Más" ● "Mujer Modelo" ● "Dulce" ● "Afortunada" ● "Esta Soy Yo" ● "Peces" ● "Muérdete La Lengua"	The audience booed after her show was cut, without letting her awarded with seagulls. No possibility of new songs and sing after the commercial break she was awarded with the gold and silver gull. In a controversy, her short time on stage was because Jorge González asked that because he would not start his show so late and if that happened he will not sing.	● Silver Torch ● Golden Torch ● Silver Seagull ● Golden Seagull	31.0 Viewers: 3.1 million
Jorge González	● "No Necesitamos Banderas" ● "We Are Sudamerican Rockers" ● "Quieren Dinero" ● "Mi Casa En El Árbol" ● "Paramar" ● "Sexo" ● "Nunca Te Haría Daño" ● "Tren Al Sur" ● "Fe" ● "Corazones Rojos" ● "Es Muy tARDE" ● "El Baile De Los Que Sobran" ● "Amiga Mía" ● "Muevan Las Industrias" ● "¿Porque No Se Van?" ● "Estrechez De Corazón" ● "Arauco Tiene Una Pena"		● Silver Torch ● Golden Torch ● Silver Seagull	31.0 Viewers: 3.1 million

=== Day 5 ===
Artist	Show/Songs Performed	Notes	Recognitions	Rating
	● ●			
Elton John	● ● ● ●		● ●	
Memo Bunke	● Humoristic show		● ●	
Albert Hammond	● ● ● ●		● ●	
La Sonora de Tommy Rey	● ● ● ●		● ●	

=== Day 6 ===
Artist	Show/Songs Performed	Notes	Recognitions	Rating
Wisin & Yandel	● "Mírala Bien" ● "Pam Pam" ● "Rakata" ● "Pegao" ● "Me Estás Tentando" ● "Zun Zun Rompiendo Caderas" ● "Mayor Que Yo" ● "Noche de Entierro (Nuestro Amor)" ● "Hipnotízame" ● "Sexy Movimiento" ● "Tu Olor" ● "Abusadora" ● "Estoy Enamorado" ● "Te Siento" ● "Besos Mojados" ● "No Me Digas Que No" ● "Follow the Leader" ● "Permitame" ● "Tu Nombre" ● "Algo Me Gusta de Ti" ● El Teléfono		● ●	
Gloria Trevi	● Agárrate ●Pelo Suelto ● Con Los Ojos Cerados ● Papas Sin Catsup ● Vestida de Azúcar ● Me Rio de Ti ● Me Siento Tan Sola ● Tu Angel de la Guarda ● El Ultimo Beso ● Todos Me Miran		● Silver Torch ● Golden Torch ● Silver Seagull ● Golden Seagull	
Pablo Alborán	● ● ● ●		● ●	
Los Auténticos Decadentes	● ● ● ●		● ●	

== Participants ==
=== International competition ===
Country	Song	Artist	Author and composers
Chile	"Ven, Ven, Bésame"	Azzu	Gustavo Pinochet, Anthony Albert
United States	"Keep the Dream Alive" ^{[B]}	Kelly King	Kelly Levesque, Brian Becvar
Iceland	"Because You Can"	Hera Björk	Hera Björk, Örlygur Smári, Jonas Gladnikoff, Christina Schilling, Camilla Gottschalck, Primož Poglajen
Italy	"L'uomo Delle Stelle"	Marcelo Marocchino	Marco Bucci, Alessandro Di Nunzio, Andrea Di Nunzio
Panama	"De Ti y de ese Abril"	Marlys	Jesú Adames
Venezuela	"Ante El Dolor"	Francisco León	William Luque, Domingo Sánchez

=== Folk competition ===
Country	Song	Artist	Author and composers
Argentina	"Patria del Viento"	Érica Germaná	
Bolivia	"Rompe Monteras"	María Juana	Marco Veizaga
Chile	"Con El Zapatito, Con El Zapatón"	Paula Herrera	Paula Herrera
Colombia	"Amanece"	Herencia de Timbiquí	Begner Vásquez
Honduras	"Mi Felicidad"	Ángela Bendeck	Ángela Bendeck
Peru	"Mi Tierras, Mi Hogar"	Leo Maya and María Jesús Rodríguez	Jesús Rodríguez

== Notes ==
- A Magaly León, is a Chilean unknown woman who won the contest for "El jurado del pueblo" (the popular judge).
- B The song replaced Canadian representative.
