= Muleta (song) =

Single by Francisca Valenzuela

from the album Muérdete La Lengua
- Released: October 2, 2008
- Recorded: 2006
- Genre: Pop
- Length: 3:42 (Album Version); 4:56 (Remix Version)
- Label: Feria Music
- Songwriter: Francisca Valenzuela
- Producers: Mauricio Durán, Francisco Durán, Francisca Valenzuela

Francisca Valenzuela singles chronology
"Afortunada" (2008)	"Muleta" (2008)	"Quiero Verte Màs" (2011)

"Muleta" is a pop song written and recorded by Chilean singer and songwriter Francisca Valenzuela and this song is the fifth official single from her first solo debut studio album, Muérdete La Lengua, released in Chile on October 2, 2008.

== Song information ==
The song was written in 2005 by Francisca Valenzuela, and the single was produced by Mauricio Durán and Francisco Durán members of Chilean Rock band Los Bunkers. The song was released on October 2, 2008 on Radios and October 16, 2008 in Digital Download in this format includes a remix featuring Jorge Gonzalez, member former of Los Prisioneros.

Valenzuela in her music video.

== Music video ==
The official music video for the song "Muleta" was premiered on MTV Latin America on October 7, 2008, later on October 30, 2007 was premiered on Via X and Zona Latina. The music video was directed by Nicolas Mantzer Weisner The video was filmed in New York, United States and shows to Francisca playing a guitar in the New York City Subway, and taking walks in Central Park wearing colorful spring outfits. The music video debuted in MTV Los 10 + Pedidos Latin America and peaked at number 7 so far.

== Track listing ==
CD Single

1. "Muleta" (Radio Version) – 3:38
2. "Muleta" (Album Version) – 3:42
3. "Muleta" (Jorge Gonzalez Remix) – 4:56

Digital Download Single

1. "Muleta" (Album Version) – 3:42
2. "Muleta" (Jorge Gonzalez Remix) – 4:56

== Release history ==
Country	Date	Record label	Format
Chile	October 2, 2008	Feria Music Records	Radio Airplay
Chile	October 16, 2008	Feria Music Records	Digital Download/CD Single
