= Annie Groovie =

Québécois writer and illustrator

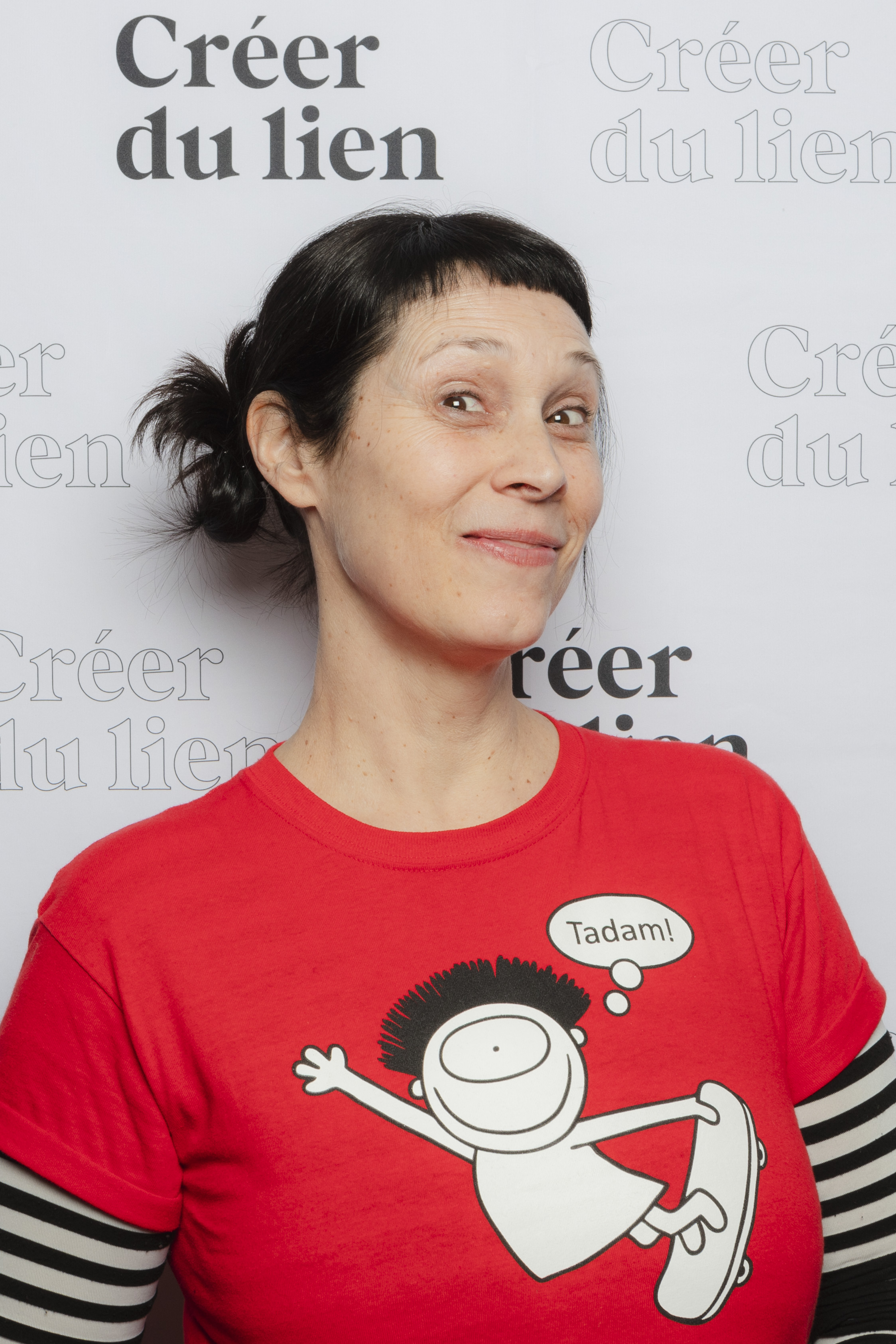
- Annie Groovie in 2023 at the Salon du livre de l'Outaouais
- Born: April 11, 1970 (age 56); Trois-Rivières, Quebec, Canada
- Occupations: writer, illustrator, cartoonist
- Writing career
- Genres: children's literature, comics
- Website: www.anniegroovie.com

Annie Groovie (the pen name of Annie Trudelle, born in Trois-Rivières April 11, 1970), is a Québécois writer and illustrator of children's literature. She wrote a series of books and comic strips featuring Léon, a young male cyclops.

== Biography ==
At three years of age, her family moved to Sainte-Foy (at the time a suburb of Quebec City). Groovie later earned a degree in Plastic Arts and a Bachelor's Degree in Graphic Communications at Université Laval, before pursuing a career as a commercial designer for Cossette, Inc. for several years in Montreal, where she has lived since 1994.

Adept at gymnastics and circus performance, Groovie was selected in 1997 by the World Circus to spend three months in Chile to teach circus skills to street children; she would later go to Africa on a similar mission in 2000.

Her travels took her to several countries around the world, including France, Switzerland, Chile, Brazil, Argentina, Costa Rica, Panama, Mexico, Cuba, Senegal and the United States.

In 2003, Groovie created Léon, a male cyclops with a shaggy hairdo; she would soon began to write a series of books for children's publisher La Courte échelle surrounding him and his cycloptic friends—Lola, his girlfriend; and Le Chat, the cat. The format of these books were part-comic book, part children's book, in which the adventures of Léon are drawn out in a series of adventures, jokes, riddles, games and fake advertisement parodies. In 2006, she left her advertising career to work full-time on Léon.

Beginning the fall of 2007, Radio-Canada television and CBC Television debuted a series of sixty-second shorts featuring Léon and friends, which aired generally between programs during their children's blocks.

A weekly Léon strip was also published Saturdays in Le Petit Journal, a weekly children's supplement included with Le Journal de Montréal and associated newspapers; this feature would be cancelled by the paper after the July 13, 2013 edition.

Léon's books have since been translated to Arabic, Korean, Italian, Spanish and Chinese.

Groovie has been a four-time winner of the Hackmatack Awards, which is awarded to the favourite Canadian children's books as nominated by readers in Atlantic Canada. She was also the Guest of Honor at the 2010 Salon international du livre de Québec in Quebec City.

On October 10, 2014, Groovie's publisher, La courte échelle, declared bankruptcy. On January 31, 2015, Groovie announced that her Léon-related works would be self-published under her own imprint, Groovie éditions, shortly after legally repossessing the rights and stock of her books and creations from La courte échelle. Her Missions à réaliser line of books, which were introduced shortly before La courte échelle's bankruptcy, would be transferred to another publisher, Éditions les Malins.

== Bibliography ==
Collection Rigolons avec Léon – The first Léon book series, in which, through a series of single-page comic stories, Léon explores a particular topic (often without words), followed by a brief description on that topic. Each book in the series was published in two versions – a large, single-volume version; and a smaller-sized version split up into two volumes.

- Léon et les expressions (2004)
- Léon et les superstitions (2005)
- Léon et les bonnes manières (2005)
- Léon et l'environnement (2006)
- Léon et les grands mystères (2008)
- Léon et les inventions
- Léon et les traditions
- Léon et les émotions (2013)
- Léon et les dictions (2015) (first book to be published under the "Groovie éditions" imprint)

Collection Jouons avec Léon – This series is a board book series for young, pre-school readers, featuring Léon presenting items associated with the subject.

- Jouons avec Léon : les émotions (2007)
- Jouons avec Léon : les sports (2007)
- Jouons avec Léon : les métiers (2007)
- Jouons avec Léon : les animaux (2007)
- Jouons avec Léon : les aliments (2008)
- Jouons avec Léon : le cirque (2008)

Collection Délirons avec Léon – A popular series featuring comic strips featuring Léon and his friends, plus jokes, riddles, puzzles, stories, interviews of interesting people, and fake TV ads – starring Groovie herself (often in costume), in photonovel fashion. 29 volumes and three special editions (Winter Olympics, Summer Olympics, and Summer) were published to date.

Léon à son meilleur – features only the comic strips previously featured in the Délirons series. Six volumes were published to date.

À vos crayons! (2011) – 60-page activity and colouring book featuring Léon and friends.

50 missions à réaliser avant la fin de l'été (50 Things to do before the End of Summer) (2014) - Groovie's first non-Leon book, featuring summer activities for children. (ISBN 9782896572601) This was also her final book that was published by La courte échelle before the publisher declared bankruptcy; the title would be picked up by another publisher, Éditions les Malins.

25 missions à réaliser durant les temps des fêtes (25 Things to do during the holidays) (2015) - Groovie's second activity book, about children's activities during the winter holidays, also published by Les Malins.

Nourris ton Génie (Feed your Genius) (2016) - a series of books about science written by Alexandra Hontoy and illustrated by Groovie, under the Groovie éditions imprint. The first two books focused on "La Lumière" (light) and "L'eau" (water).
