= World Circus (disambiguation) =

The name World Circus may refer to:

- World Circus, a 1987 album by the rock group Toxik
- World Circus (circus), a circus group based in Switzerland
- World Circus Sideshow, a former sideshow on Coney Island
