= Muérdete La Lengua (song) =

Single by Francisca Valenzuela

from the album Muérdete La Lengua
- Released: September 15, 2007
- Recorded: 2006
- Genre: Alternative rock, piano rock
- Length: 2:59
- Label: Feria Music
- Songwriter: Francisca Valenzuela
- Producers: Mauricio Durán, Francisco Durán

Francisca Valenzuela singles chronology
| "Dulce" (2006) | "Muérdete La Lengua" (2007) | "Afortunada" (2007) |

Music video
- "Muérdete La Lengua" on YouTube

"Muérdete La Lengua" ("Bite Your Tongue") is a rock song by Chilean singer and songwriter Francisca Valenzuela. It was released on September 15, 2007 through Feria Music, as the official third single from her debut studio album of the same name.

== Composition and release ==
The song was written during 2005 by Francisca Valenzuela, and was produced by Mauricio Durán and Francisco Durán, members of Chilean Rock band Los Bunkers. The song was released on September 15, 2007 on Radios and Digital Download.

== Music video ==
Valenzuela in her music video.

The official music video for the song "Muérdete La Lengua" was premiered on MTV Latin America on September 30, 2007 with high popularity in Chilean music channels. It was later premiered on Via X and Zona Latina. The music video was directed by Igal Weitzman and in it Francisca is shown singing in psychedelic screenshoots with her face painted in white along with dogs.

== Charts ==
| Chart (2007) | Peak position |
|---|---|
| Chile Singles Chart (Monitor Latino) | 6 |
