= Dulce (song) =

2006 single by Francisca Valenzuela

Single by Francisca Valenzuela

from the album Muérdete La Lengua
- Released: December 28, 2006 (Airplay); March 12, 2007 (Digital Download)
- Recorded: 2006
- Genre: Pop
- Length: 3:28 (Album Version); 3:20 (Radio Version)
- Label: Feria Music
- Songwriter: Francisca Valenzuela
- Producers: Mauricio Durán, Francisco Durán

Francisca Valenzuela singles chronology
"Peces" (2006)	"Dulce" (2006)	"Muérdete La Lengua" (2007)

"Dulce" (Sweet) is a pop song recorded by Chilean singer and song-writer Francisca Valenzuela and this song is the second single and also the more successful single released from her first solo debut studio album, Muérdete La Lengua, which was released in Chile on December 28, 2006.

== Song information ==
The song was written during 2005 by Valenzuela, and produced by Mauricio Durán and Francisco Durán, members of Chilean Rock band Los Bunkers. The song was released on December 28, 2006 on the radio. Subsequently, on March 12, 2007, it was made available for Digital Download.

== Music video ==
Valenzuela in her music video.

The official music video for the song "Dulce" was premiered on Via X on January 30, 2007 with high popularity in the Chilean music channels, later on March 12, 2007 was premiered for MTV Latin America, the same day of the Digital release of the single. The music video was directed by Francisca García and in the simple music video shows to Francisca playing a piano in front a black screen with candies over the piano.

== Track listing ==
Promo Single

1. "Dulce" (Radio Version) – 3:20
2. "Dulce" (Album Version) – 3:28

Digital Download Single

1. "Dulce" (Album Version) – 3:28

== Release history ==
Country	Date	Record label	Format
Chile	December 28, 2006	Feria Music	Radio Airplay
Chile	March 12, 2007	Feria Music	Digital Download
Chile	April 2, 2008	Feria Music	CD Single
