= Oleada =

Single by Julieta Venegas

from the album Sí
- Language: Spanish
- Released: 2005
- Recorded: 2002 at Una Casa Con Tres Pinos & Soul Records, Madrid, Spain
- Length: 3:16
- Label: Ariola; BMG
- Songwriters: Julieta Venegas, Coti Sorokin
- Producers: Coti Sorokin, Julieta Venegas

Julieta Venegas singles chronology
"Algo Está Cambiando" (2005)	"Oleada" (2005)	"Me Voy" (2006)

"Oleada" (English: "Wave") is the fourth single from Sí, the third studio album by Mexican singer-songwriter Julieta Venegas.

== Song information ==
The song was written by Coti Sorokin and Julieta Venegas. Ranked 31 on the Billboard Latin Pop Airplay release.

== Music video ==
The music video was directed by Valdés & Chicle and recorded in National Park Insurgente Miguel Hidalgo y Costilla (La Marquesa), State of Mexico. Creatures named Frijolitos were designed by Miguel Campos. The video itself starts with Julieta Venegas carrying two suitcases and placing them in the trunk of her car, later driving away with her dog while singing cheerfully.

Julieta is then seen outside her car in the middle of the road, admiring the scenery. After driving a little more, she finds herself surrounded by a group of small shadowy creatures that play with the dog and ride on its back.

Then she's shown to have taken the creatures with her in the car, and the group is being followed by a sky blue giant through the desert. The last time she stops, the giant grabs the car and toys around with it. She's seen in an unknown location, singing some more, while the dark creatures playfully unpack her belongings and scare the dog away.

== Tracking list ==
CD Single

1. "Oleada"

== Charts ==
=== Weekly charts ===
Chart performance for "Oleada"
Chart (2005)	Peak position
Mexico (Monitor Latino)	9
Nicaragua (Notimex)	2
US Latin Pop Airplay (Billboard)	31
