= Fontana Bella =

Studio album by Austin TV
- Released: 5 May 2007
- Recorded: 2005–2007
- Genre: Post-rock; Indie rock
- Length: 53:03
- Label: Terrícolas Imbéciles

Austin TV chronology
Temblaban Con Sonata Solitaria (2006)	Fontana Bella (2007)

Professional ratings
Review scores
Source	Rating
AllMusic	4.5/5 stars

Fontana Bella is the second studio album by the Mexican post rock band Austin TV. Released in May 2007 by the indie label Terricolas Imbéciles. It was recorded at El Ensayo Recording Studio by Emmanuel del Real (member of Café Tacuba) and produced by del Real with the band. The songs on the album were composed by Austin TV in a small house in the middle of the woods in a place called Avandaro.

Like previous albums from Austin TV, all tracks are instrumental, only accompanied with spoken voices that are not related musically.

This album could be catalogued under a concept album, including a more than 60 pages CD-sized book. This complement is a fictional diary of an old man called Mario Lupo González Fábila (Fontana Bella's alternate title is El Diario de Mario Lupo González Fábila), living alone in a forest called Fontana Bella (the album's main title). The diary shows a 5 months struggle with paranormal phenomena such as ghosts appearances, hallucinations and persecutory delusions (It may be depicted in real life as an alleged dementia or any incurable disease), including phlegmatic thoughts, anecdotes, attached letters and notes. The last days of the diary show distorted typography, scratches in some paragraphs, backwards chapters, cryptic letters and macabre imagery, resuming a progressive deterioration in Mario Lupo's world, or a complete insanity (even the last track called Voló Al Cielo (or Flew To The Sky) could confirm the death of the protagonist). The days appear at the top of the pages, starting from July 5 to November 2, probably making an allusion to the Day of the Dead (or Día de Muertos), a very important date in Mexico, which is celebrated that last day.

The artist Marcos Castro created more than 30 paintings and drawings to illustrate this story.

== Personnel ==
- Chato - Electric guitar
- Chiosan - Synthesizers, piano, vibraphone, glockenspiel, harmonium, clapping
- Oiram - Electric guitar, acoustic guitar
- Rata - Bass
- Xnayer - Drums, bass pad, acoustic guitar, clapping
- Austin TV - Original idea, story and redaction of Fontana Bella
- Carlos Villanueva - Style reviser
- Marcos Castro, Trevore Valensuela - Artwork and design

=== Additional personnel/invited musicians ===
- Emmanuel del Real - Mellotron, Wurlitzer Piano and Tubular Bells
- Carlos Alegre - Violins

Clappings on "Shiva":

- Normand Oleo (from Hummersqueal)
- Christian Guijosa (from Hummerqueal)
- Alejandro Batta
- Leo Quiñones

== Voices ==
This album has the characteristic of showing several speeches spoken by voice actors, members of the band or related people. Some can't be heard due to the lack of volume or amount of noise, but some are very important to understand the plot of the record and are clearly audible.

Main voices:

- Francisco González
- Miriam Calderón

Support voices:

- Sebastián Díaz
- Edna Godinez
- Aldo González
- Nasoihc (Chiosan's pseudonym)
- Otahc (Chato's pseudonym)
- Atar (Rata's pseudonym)
- Enrique Sinaloa
- Trevore Valensuela
- Humberto Sánchez
- Haydé Corona

== Track listing ==
1. "Ana No te Fallé. B" - 5:24
2. "Voces Iluminadas por Sonrientes" - 4:44
3. "Marduk" - 4:30
4. "El Secreto (De las Luciérnagas)" - 5:38
5. "Nadie Esta Aquí, No Hay Nadie Aquí, Nada Hay Aquí" - 6:48
6. "Flores Sobre las Piedras" - 4:13
7. "Shiva" - 3:37
8. "Mientras las Hojas Caen" - 4:45
9. "Voló al Cielo" - 13:24
