= Lento (Julieta Venegas song) =

Single by Julieta Venegas

from the album Sí
- Released: 30 July 2004
- Recorded: 2002
- Studio: Una Casa Con Tres Pinos & Soul Records (Madrid, Spain)
- Genre: Latin pop
- Length: 4:05
- Label: Ariola; BMG
- Songwriters: Julieta Venegas; Coti Sorokin
- Producers: Cori Sorokin; Julieta Venegas

Julieta Venegas singles chronology
"Andar Conmigo" (2003)	"Lento" (2004)	"Algo Está Cambiando" (2005)

"Lento" (English: "Slow") is a song recorded by Mexican singer Julieta Venegas, from her third studio album, Sí (2003). This particular track was recognized by the Latin music website Club Fonograma as the fifth-best song of the 2000s decade.

== Song information ==
The song was written by Coti Sorokin and Julieta Venegas. Venegas plays the accordion, drum machine and keyboards on the track. It made the Billboard chart, and reached positions 31 and 13 on the Hot Latin Songs and Latin Pop Airplay respectively. Venegas performed a new version on piano for her MTV Unplugged in 2008.

== Live performance ==
The Mexican hip hop group Cartel de Santa performed the song for the MTV Video Music Awards Latinoamérica 2004 in Miami, Florida.

== Music video ==
The music video was filmed in Japan, and featured Venegas's twin sister Yvonne. It was directed by Rogelio Sikander. It begins with Julieta walking the streets of Tokyo and following her sister Yvonne. The two are dressed in the same clothes and have the same hairstyle (except for Yvonne having shorter hair). Animated flowers and plants begin to grow each time Julieta goes through a street and on anything she touches. The video ends with the sisters playing a crane game.

== Track listing ==
CD Single

1. "Lento" — 4:03

== Charts ==
=== Weekly charts ===
Chart performance for "Lento"
Chart (2004)	Peak position
Mexico (Monitor Latino)	1
US Hot Latin Songs (Billboard)	31
US Latin Pop Airplay (Billboard)	13
Venezuela (Record Report)	9
