= Malditas canciones =

Studio album by Coti Sorokin
- Released: 31 March 2009
- Genre: Rock en español
- Label: Universal Music

Coti Sorokin chronology
Gatos y Palomas (2007)	Malditas canciones (2009)

Professional ratings
Review scores
Source	Rating
Allmusic	3.5/5 stars

Malditas Canciones is Coti Sorokin's fifth solo album. It earned a Latin Grammy Award nomination for Best Male Pop Vocal Album. Its lead single "Nunca Tendré" peaked at #29 on the Billboard Latin Pop Airplay.

== Track listing ==
1. "Malditas canciones"
2. "Ya pasó"
3. "Nunca tendré"
4. "Perdóname"
5. "Jugando con vos"
6. "Tanta magia"
7. "Frank Sinatra"
8. "Comer tu boca"
9. "El verdadero Rock and Roll"
10. "Aquí y Ahora"

== Personnel ==
- Fender Rhodes, Juno, Keyboards, Moog Synthesizer, Piano, Sintetizador, Synthesizer, Wurlitzer Piano - Adrian Schinoff
- Vocals - Coro Gospel De La Iglesia De Los Tres Pinos
- Accordion, Arranger, Audio Production, Bass Instrument, Bongos, Composer, 12 String Guitar, Acoustic Guitar, Electric Guitar, Hammond B3, Handclapping, Harmonica, Letra, Percussion, Piano, Primary Artist, Synthesizer, Tumba, Vocals - Coti
- Primary Artist - Coti Sorokin
- Petal Steel, Pedal Steel Guitar - David Soler
- Saxophone - Javier Anguera
- Vocals - Jesus
- Vocals - Marc
- Bateria, Drums - Marcelo Novati
- Electric Guitar, Handclapping - Matias Sorokin
- Recording - Max Miglin
- Flugelhorn, Trumpet - Paco Ibanez
- Featured Artist - Pereza
- Electric Guitar, Vocals - Pío Leiva
- Electric Guitar, Vocals - Ruben
- Featured Artist - Sidonie
- Mastering - Ted Jensen
- Mixing - Tom Lord-Alge
