= La niña futbolista =

Song by Los Patita de Perro

Song by los Patita de Perro

from the album Los derechos de los niños
- Language: Spanish
- Length: 2:50
- Label: Fonarte Latino
- Songwriter: Ignacio Silva

Music video
- "La niña futbolista" on YouTube

"La niña futbolista" (transl. "The girl football player") is a 2003 song by the Mexican children's music band los Patita de Perro. The song tells the story of a girl who is mocked for playing association football because of gender stereotypes that discourage girls from participating in the sport. It was included on the band's album Los derechos de los niños.

Mexican singer Julieta Venegas released a cover of the song in 2026, ahead of the 2026 FIFA World Cup, which Mexico co-hosted. The cover, promoted by the federal government of Mexico, drew criticism because it was released in conjunction with the men's tournament rather than a women's tournament, like the FIFA Women's World Cup.

== Background and writing ==
The lyrics of "La niña futbolista" tell the story of a girl who is ridiculed by her schoolmates and family for playing football because of gender stereotypes. Despite the mockery, she demonstrates her skill in the sport. The song was conceived in 1995 or 1996 while los Patita de Perro was in Puebla. Its members saw a girl around nine year old dressed in football kit playing on a sidewalk, which served as its inspiration. The song was included on the 2003 album Los derechos de los niños.

== Julieta Venegas version ==
"La niña futbolista"

Song by Julieta Venegas with a choir from the National Conservatory of Music
- Language: Spanish
- Recorded: 2026
- Length: 3:20
- Songwriter: Ignacio Silva
- Producer: Yamil Rezc

Music video
- "La niña futbolista" on YouTube

Ahead the 2026 FIFA World Cup, co-hosted by Mexico, its federal government asked Julieta Venegas to record a cover version. It was originally intended to be released on Children's Day, celebrated on 30 April in Mexico, to encourage girls to play football. The version features an ensamble of female students from the National Conservatory of Music. The version was produced by Yamil Rezc.

Venegas modified the lyrics "to reinforce a message of support for girls". One of the changes was that, in the original version, the girl's parents did not want her to play football, whereas in Venegas's version, only her father opposes her. The music video was filmed at the Estudios Churubusco, in Mexico City, produced by Canal 22.

The song and video were published on 29 May during the morning press briefing held by Claudia Sheinbaum, the president of Mexico. According to Claudia Curiel, secretary of culture, the idea was proposed by Citlalli Hernández, the former secretary of women. At the time of its release, the presentation of "La niña futbolista" was regarded as part of Mexico's promotional campaign for the opening ceremony of the 2026 FIFA World Cup, which was held in Mexico City on 11 June.

=== Reception ===
Venegas version received criticism for its feminist approach ahead a men's tournament rather than a women's tournament, as well as the outdated idea that women cannot play football in the country, although its message of gender equality was regarded as positive. Analist Carolina Solis considers the song "doesn't attempt to describe Mexico, but rather to envision it—a Mexico where girls can achieve anything. In reality, however, it speaks of yet another 'exception'. In Mexico, girls not only face social disapproval but also have to fight against other barriers that exist for women".

Social media users began criticizing the song on YouTube. After comments on the video were disabled, they continued posting criticism on other videos on Venegas's channel. The music video for "La niña futbolista" was subsequently removed from her YouTube channel in late July.
