= Algo está cambiando =

"Algo Está Cambiando"

Single by Julieta Venegas

from the album Sí
- Language: Spanish
- Released: 16 December 2004
- Recorded: 2002
- Studio: Una Casa Con Tres Pinos & Soul Records (Madrid, Spain)
- Genre: Pop rock; indie pop
- Length: 4:04
- Label: Ariola; BMG
- Songwriters: Julieta Venegas, Coti Sorokin
- Producers: Coti Sorokin, Julieta Venegas

Julieta Venegas singles chronology
"Lento" (2004)	"Algo Está Cambiando" (2004)	"Oleada" (2005)

Music video
- "Algo está cambiando" on YouTube

"Algo Está Cambiando" (English: Something is Changing) is the third single from the Mexican singer Julieta Venegas off her third studio album Sí.

== Song information ==
The song was written by Coti Sorokin and Julieta Venegas occupying the first places of the Billboard charts, and reached the top position at Mexico.

== Music video ==
The video, recorded by Rigoberto Castañeda, shows Julieta entering an apartment where she carelessly throws her keys to a wooden table, removes her pink jacket placing it on a chair in the hallway and hurries to answer the phone, accidentally breaking a long, white vase in the process. She briefly speaks on the phone and then hurries to take her jacket and keys while a still take of a photograph of a groping couple is shown as she puts the jacket back on and leaves the apartment just to come right back in.

She repeats the same sequence of actions, but the key chain, vase and most of the furniture changes in color and style. A photograph of the same couple sitting further away but smiling is shown, then the singer leaves the apartment to reveal a couple of copies of her with different clothes hanging from the coat stand singing and moving their feet rhythmically.

The sequence repeats itself twice, with Julieta becoming increasingly careless with the way she throws the keys and breaks the vases, and dismissing such things as unimportant; showing pictures of the couple sitting further away and ignoring each other, and adding a new copy of her on the hanger each time. By the fourth time the sequence repeats itself, the furniture begins to shift randomly around the apartment.

The fifth time she comes back in, most of the furniture is gone, so Julieta decides to hang on to her keys and puts them in her pocket, throws her jacket on the floor and dances happily to the phone. By the end, the spectator realizes that her neglecting boyfriend is finally "out of the picture".

== Track listing ==
Digital Download

1. "Algo Está Cambiando

CD Single

1. "Algo Está Cambiando"

== Charts ==
Chart performance for "Algo Está Cambiando"
Chart (2004–2005)	Peak position
Mexico (Monitor Latino)	1
US Hot Latin Songs (Billboard)	4
US Latin Pop Airplay (Billboard)	1
