= Andar Conmigo =

Single by Julieta Venegas

from the album Sí
- Language: Spanish
- Released: 15 September 2003
- Recorded: 2002
- Studio: Una Casa Con Tres Pinos & Soul Records (Madrid, Spain)
- Genre: Pop rock; latin pop
- Length: 3:17
- Label: Ariola; BMG
- Songwriters: Julieta Venegas; Coti Sorokin
- Producers: Coti Sorokin; Julieta Venegas

Julieta Venegas singles chronology
"Hoy No Quiero" (2000)	"Andar Conmigo" (2003)	"Lento" (2004)

"Andar Conmigo" (lit. transl. "Hang out with me"; phrasal sense: "Do you want to be my boyfriend?") is the lead single by Mexican singer Julieta Venegas from her third studio album Sí (2003). The song was nominated for Latin Grammy Award for Song of the Year.

A regional Mexican duet version of "Andar Conmigo" with Marca Registrada was released on March 1, 2024.

== Song information ==
This song was written and produced by Coti Sorokin and Julieta Venegas, who plays the accordion and drum machine with Coti on guitars, bass and vocals (background). It was released as a debut single from her album in 2003, occupying the 33rd place on Billboard and 14 on the Hot Latin Tracks and Latin Pop Airplay. It also took first place in Mexican radio ratings for 15 weeks. In 2008, Venegas made a new version of the song for her MTV Unplugged.

== Live performance ==
In the 6° installment Latin Grammy Award for singing with the band norteña Los Tigres del Norte a popurrí of "El Taxista", "Andar Conmigo (Norteña Version)" and "La Manzanita".

== Music video ==
The music video was filmed in Buenos Aires under the direction of Santiago Pueyrredon. The video was paid for with Julieta's own money because the label did not want to give her money for the film. The "actors" were friends, relatives and acquaintances of Julieta.

The video depicts a bride in a canteen looking for a partner. She wears a torn dress and no makeup. She walks around the canteen seeing potential partners of all ages. In the end Julieta appears sporting a new dress and makeup, and gives the "yes" to a mature gentleman outside the bar and they kiss.

The video was nominated for "Video of the Year" in at the 2004 MTV VMALAs, but was ultimately won by Cafe Tacvba's "Eres".

== Track listing ==
Digital download

1. "Andar Conmigo" — 3:15

CD Single

1. "Andar Conmigo" — 3:17

== Charts ==
=== Weekly charts ===
Weekly chart performance for "Andar Conmigo"
Chart (2003–2004)	Peak position
Colombia (Notimex)	1
Mexico (Monitor Latino)	1
US Hot Latin Songs (Billboard)	33
US Latin Pop Airplay (Billboard)	17
