= Eva Gómez =

Chilean journalist and TV Presenter

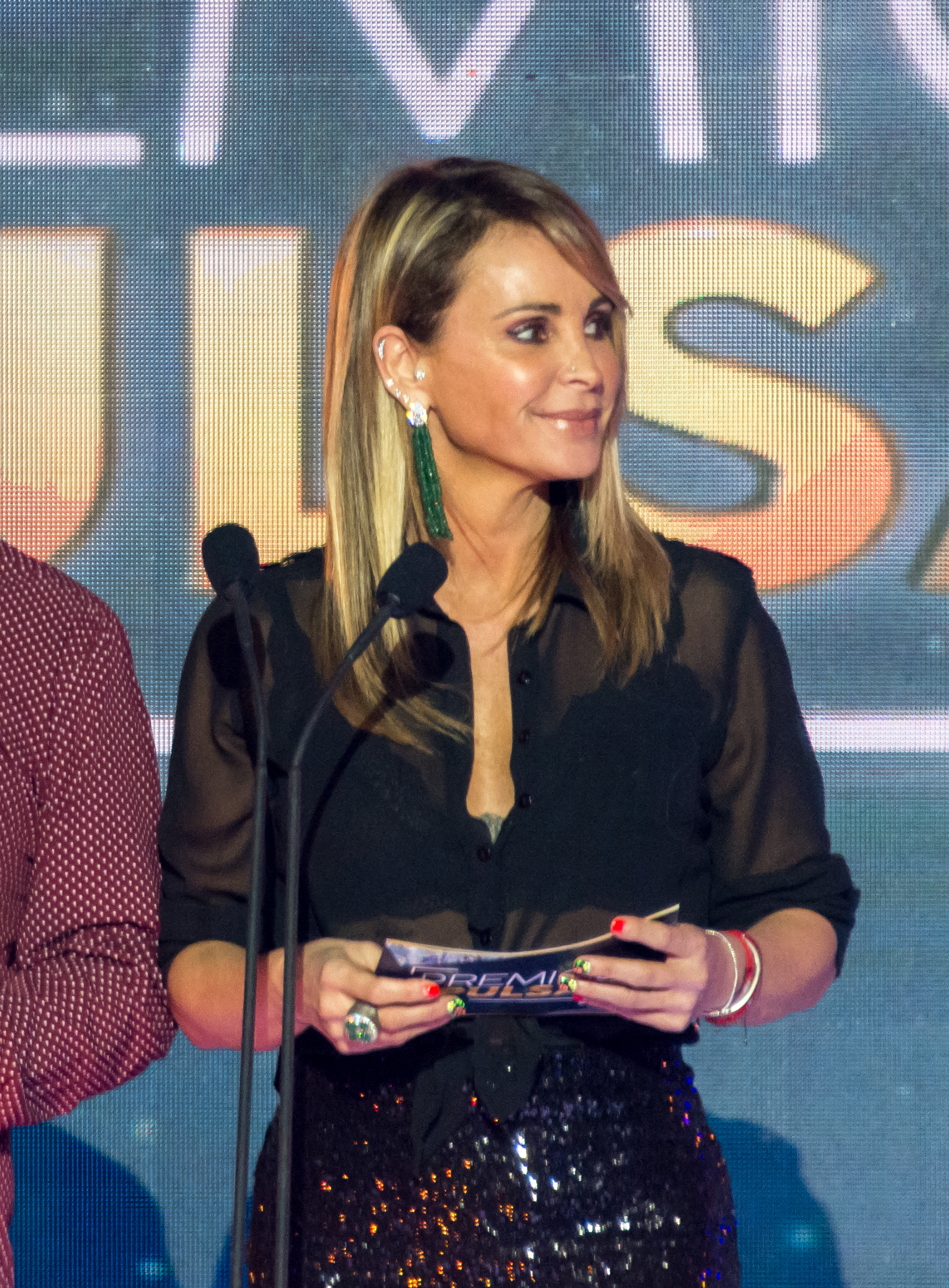
- Born: Eva María Gómez Sánchez; 30 June 1971 (age 54); Seville, Province of Seville, Andalusia (Spain)
- Occupations: television presenter, journalist
- Spouses: Fernando Pesce; Pablo Morales (m. 2010–2013)
- Children: Fernando Pesce; Matías Pesce; Triana Morales

Eva María Gómez Sánchez (born 30 June 1971 in Seville) is a Spanish-born Chilean journalist and TV hostess.

== Biography ==
Moved to Chile in 1995. Mother of Fernando Pesce and Matías Pesce with ex-husband Fernando Pesce. Studied journalism at Diego Portales University. Close friend of Benjamín Vicuña's sister. Mother of Triana Morales with Pablo Morales. Has two older brothers.

== Filmography ==
Year	Programme	Role	Channel
2001–2003	SQP	Journalistic producer	Chilevisión
2003–2010	El diario de Eva	TV Hostess	Chilevisión
2004	Ángeles	TV Hostess	Chilevisión
2005–2006	Historias de Eva	TV Hostess	Chilevisión
2007	Premios Altazor	TV Presenter	Chilevisión
2007	Cantando por un sueño	Contestant	Canal 13
2007	Teatro en CHV	Guest Star	Chilevisión
2009	Estos niños son imbatibles	TV Hostess	Chilevisión
2010	Don Diablo	Actress	Chilevisión
2011	LII Viña del Mar International Song Festival	TV Presenter	Chilevisión; A&E Network
2011	Super Estrellas	TV Hostess	Chilevisión
2012	LIII Viña del Mar International Song Festival	TV Presenter	Chilevisión; A&E Network
2012	La mañana de Chilevisión	TV Hostess	Chilevisión
2013	LIV Viña del Mar International Song Festival	TV Presenter	Chilevisión; A&E Network
2013	Lo que callamos las mujeres	TV Hostess	Chilevisión
2013	Manos al fuego	TV Hostess	Chilevisión
2013	Talento chileno	TV Hostess	Chilevisión
