= Muérdete La Lengua =

Studio album by Francisca Valenzuela
- Released: June 30, 2007
- Recorded: 2005–2007 at en Estudios Triana, y Estudios Iberoamerican S.A in Santiago, Chile.
- Genre: Pop, folk, pop rock, jazz
- Length: 50:11
- Label: Feria Music
- Producer: Mauricio Durán, Francisco Durán

Francisca Valenzuela chronology
Muérdete La Lengua (2007)	Buen Soldado (2011)

Singles from Muérdete La Lengua
- 1. "Peces" Released: March 25, 2006; 2. "Dulce" Released: December 28, 2006; 3. "Muerdete La Lengua" Released: September 15, 2007; 4. "Afortunada" Released: January 7, 2008; 5. "Muleta" Released: October 2, 2008

Muérdete La Lengua (Bite Your Tongue) is the debut album by American-born Chilean singer, songwriter and composer Francisca Valenzuela. The album was released on June 30, 2007 in Chile for Feria Music Records. The album's first single was "Peces" (Fishes) and was released in 2006. Though "Peces" did not chart, it gained Valenzuela radio play and popularity in Chile. The second and lead single of the album was "Dulce" (Sweet). Rolling Stone Chile included the album as number 16 in its "50 Best CDs of 2007" in an international list. In early 2008, the album was certified gold in Chile. In January 2013, it earned platinum certification in Chile for sales of 10,000 copies or more. The album includes eleven original songs all written and composed by Valenzuela including an English song, called "Queen". In 2008, a deluxe edition was released, which included all ten tracks from the previous release as well as a remix of "Muleta" (Crutche) and a new song in English and Spanish, "No Necesito Mucho" (I Don't Need Much).

== Track listing ==
1. "Peces (Fishes)" – 3:54
2. "Muérdete La Lengua (Bite Your Tongue)" – 2:59
3. "Afortunada (Lucky One)" – 3:34
4. "Excavador De Tumbas (Grave Digger)" 3:26
5. "Muleta (Crutch)" – 3:42
6. "Los Poderosos (The Powerful)" – 4:36
7. "Dulce (Sweet)" – 3:28
8. "Segunda Vuelta (second round)" – 3:41
9. "Las Vegas" – 4:27
10. "Esta Noche (Algo Que No Doy) (Tonight)" – 8:58 ("Queen" is a hidden track on this song.)

=== Bonus tracks ===
- Digital download
1. "Muleta" (Jorge Gonzalez Remix) – 4:56
- DVD
1. "No Necesito Mucho" (Live Version) – 5:26
2. "Queen" – 2:17
3. Exclusive Live Performance.
- Note: All songs were written and composed by Francisca Valenzuela.
