= Madame Saatan =

Brazilian heavy metal band

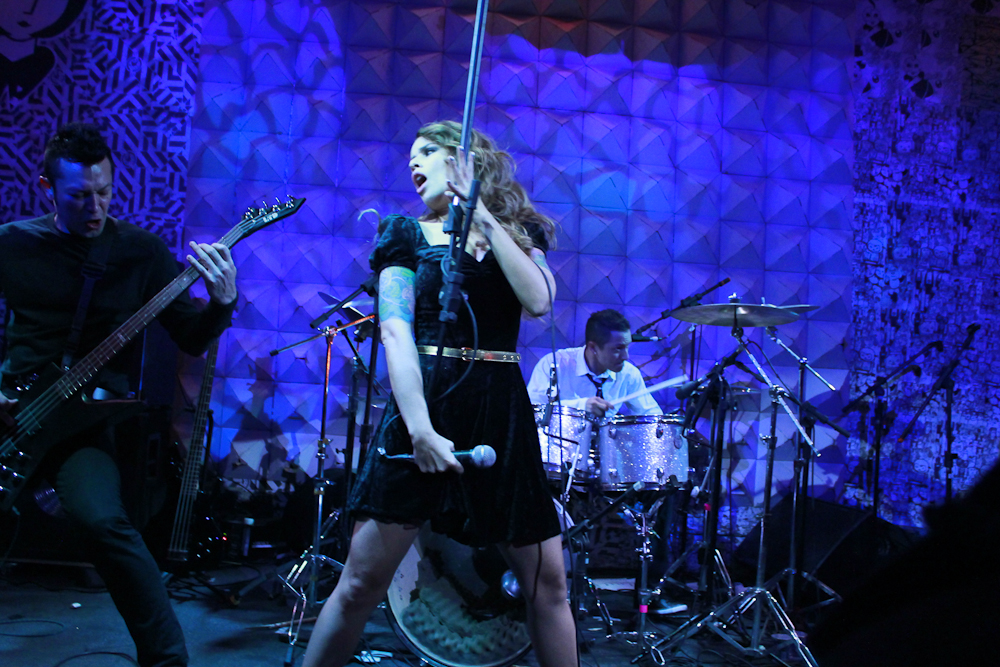
- Madame Saatan live at the 2011 Cedo e Sentado in São Paulo, Brazil. From left to right: Ícaro Suzuki, Sammliz and Ivan Vanza

Background information
- Origin: Belém, Pará, Brazil
- Genres: Alternative metal, heavy metal, folk metal, carimbó
- Years active: 2003–2014
- Labels: Doutromundo Discos, Ná Records
- Past members: Sammliz; Ícaro Suzuki; Ivan Vanzar; Ed Guerreiro; Wagner Nugoli; Vince; Zé Mario
- Website: www.madamesaatan.com

Madame Saatan was a Brazilian heavy metal band formed in 2003 in Belém.

On 2 October 2012, Ícaro was hit by a car driven by detective Carlos Alberto Nascimento, who was drunk driving. Carlos was arrested, but bailed out, while Ícaro recovered with some medicine.

In 2014, vocalist Sammliz announced she would leave the group to focus on solo projects. The band then decided to pause their activities indefinitely because their manager Bernie Walbenny doesn't consider the possibility of replacing Sammliz.

== Members ==
=== Current members ===
- Ed Guerreiro - guitar and backing vocals
- Ícaro Suzuki - bass and backing vocals
- Vince - bass (Ícaro's Suzuki)
- Wagner Nugoli - drums (surrogate)

=== Former members ===
- Sammliz - vocals
- Ivan Vanzar - drums and backing vocals
- Zé Mário - guitar

== Discography ==
- 2004 - O Tao do Caos (demo)
- 2007 - Madame Saatan
- 2011 - Peixe Homem
