= Sir Speedy =

Printing and marketing services company headquartered in California, U.S.

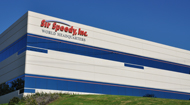
- Sir Speedy Corporate Office
- Company type: Private
- Industry: Marketing Services, Printing
- Founded: 1968; 58 years ago
- Headquarters: Mission Viejo, California, U.S.
- Key people: Richard Lowe, CEO
- Website: Sir Speedy Printing and Marketing Services

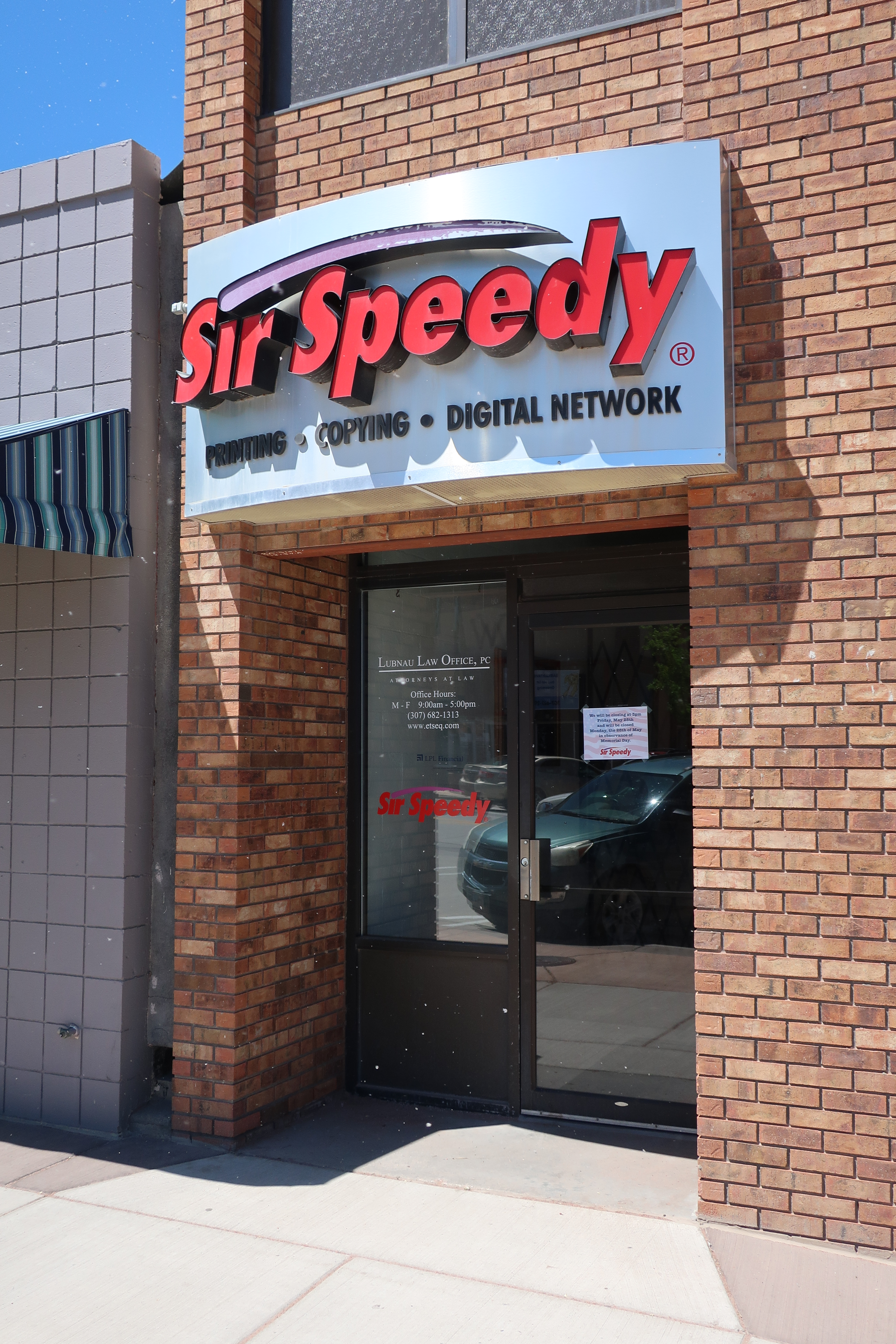
A Sir Speedy in Gillette, Wyoming

Sir Speedy is a printing and marketing services company headquartered in Mission Viejo, California, United States. Founded in 1968, the company has nearly 600 franchises in 13 countries.

Richard Lowe was named CEO in February 2025.

== Recognition ==
Sir Speedy has received numerous awards and industry recognition including: Franchise Times' Top 200, Entrepreneur Franchise 500, Quick Printing Top 100, Printing Impressions 400, All Business Allstar 300, Franchise 50 Award, and the International Franchise Association's Franchise of the Year Award.

CEO, Don Lowe, was featured as "Man of the Year" in Quick Printing magazine in 1995, and was inducted into the Sales & Marketing Executives International Academy of Achievement Hall of Fame in 2004.
