= La última noche del mundo =

Studio album by Austin TV
- Released: November 2003
- Genre: Post-Rock; Ambient; Alternative
- Length: 45:18
- Label: Grabaxiones Alicias

Austin TV chronology
Austin TV EP (2002)	La última noche del mundo (2003)	Asrael (2004)

La última noche del mundo (Spanish for the last night of the world) is the debut album by Mexican post-rock band Austin TV.

The art of the CD was made by Xnayer and the box contains a small booklet with a photo-story made by Enrique Sinaloa, telling the adventures of a little girl named Ashia. This CD was very musically and creatively influenced by Ray Bradbury specially by his book The Illustrated Man. The art and design was influenced strongly by fairy tales books and art.

== Track listing ==
1. "Roy Rogers" - 3:04
2. "Ella No Me Conoce" - 4:48
3. "Rucci" - 4:41
4. "Mr. Galaxia" - 3:28
5. "Olvidé Decir Adios" - 4:52
6. "Hazme Sentir" - 5:26
7. "Ashia" - 6:42
8. "La Última Noche Del Mundo" - 10:39
9. "Bonus Track" (Unlisted) - 1:41

== Trivia ==
- The song "Roy Rogers" contains dialogue excerpts from the movie "Back To The Future Part II".
- The Song "Rucci" Contains dialogue from a Mexican movie released on 1984 called "Veneno para las Hadas"
