= Frijoles Romanticos =

Frijoles Románticos is a primarily Latin-themed band from McAllen, Texas which blends rock, cumbia, Latin Funk, and ballad styles.

== Members ==
Band members include Tury Alviar, Eddie Gonzalez, Noel Hernandez, Epi Martinez, Lucky Joe Paredes, and Aldo Solis.

== Awards ==
In 2004, the Frijoles Romanticos, were nominated for Best Tejano Album of the 46th Annual Grammy Awards.

Epi Martinez of the Frijoles Romanticos won the 2007 Tejano Music Award for Percussion.
