= Juan Tavares =

Brazilian footballer (born 2002)

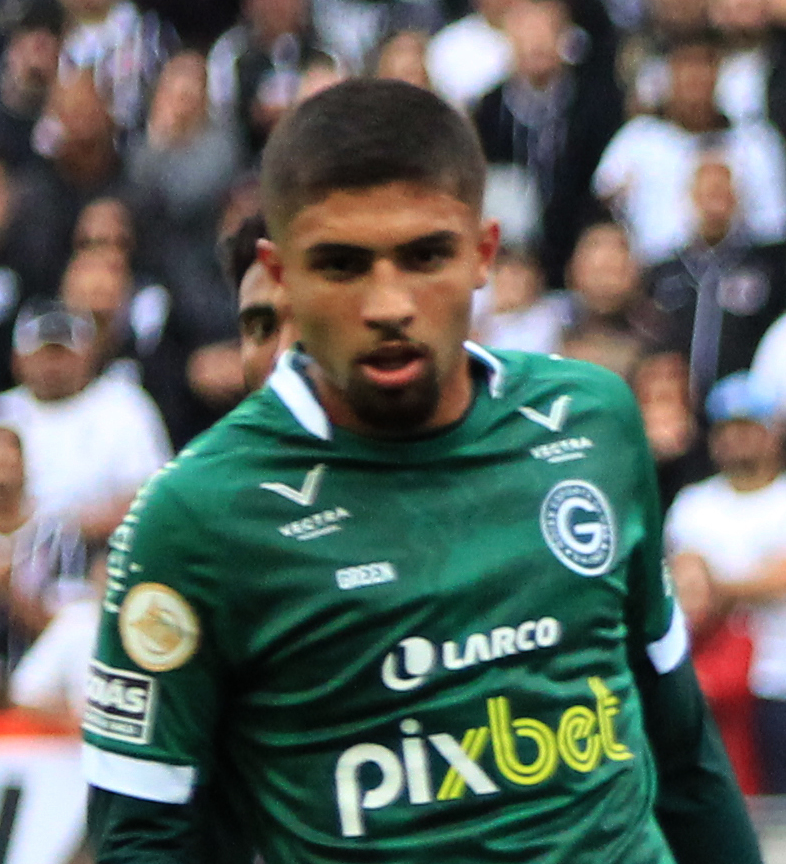

Personal information
- Full name: Juan Pablo Vilela Tavares
- Date of birth: 25 April 2002 (age 24)
- Place of birth: Brasília, Brazil
- Height: 1.79 m (5 ft 10 in)
- Position: Left back

Team information
- Current team: Inter de Limeira

Youth career
- Águas Claras
- Atlético Mineiro
- 2016–2022: Goiás

Senior career*
Years	Team	Apps	(Gls)
2022	Goiás	4	(0)
2023	Paysandu	3	(0)
2023–2025	Cuiabá	4	(0)
2024	→ Santa Cruz (loan)	11	(0)
2025	→ Inter de Limeira (loan)	8	(0)
2025–	Inter de Limeira	0	(0)
- * Club domestic league appearances and goals as of 9 November 2026

Juan Pablo Vilela Tavares (born 25 April 2002), known as Juan Tavares or just Juan, is a Brazilian professional footballer who plays as a left back for Inter de Limeira.

== Club career ==
Born in Brasília, Federal District, Juan joined Goiás' youth setup in 2016, from Atlético Mineiro. He made his first team – and Série A – debut on 15 May 2022, coming on as a late substitute for Diego in a 1–0 home win over Santos.

Juan left the Esmeraldino on a mutual agreement on 29 December 2022, and signed for Série C side Paysandu on 17 January 2023. On 5 March, however, he left the latter club after just four matches, and subsequently moved to Cuiabá, initially for the under-23 team.

== Career statistics ==
As of 8 July 2024

Club	Season	League			State League		Cup		Continental		Other		Total	
Club	Season	Division	Apps	Goals	Apps	Goals	Apps	Goals	Apps	Goals	Apps	Goals	Apps	Goals
Goiás	2022	Série A	4	0	0	0	1	0	—		1 (Note: Appearance(s) in Copa Verde)	0	6	0
Paysandu	2023	Série C	0	0	3	0	0	0	—		1	0	4	0
Cuiabá	2023	Série A	0	0	—		—		—		—		0	0
Cuiabá	2024	Série A	0	0	—		1	0	0	0	—		1	0
Cuiabá	Total		0	0	—		1	0	0	0	—		1	0
Santa Cruz (loan)	2024	Pernambucano	—		11	0	—		—		1 (Note: Appearance(s) in Copa do Nordeste)	0	12	0
Career total			4	0	14	0	2	0	0	0	3	0	23	0
