= Sí (Julieta Venegas album) =

2003 studio album by Julieta Venegas

Studio album by Julieta Venegas
- Released: 18 November 2003
- Recorded: 2002–2003
- Genre: Pop rock
- Length: 35:03
- Language: Spanish
- Labels: Ariola; BMG
- Producers: Julieta Venegas; Cachorro López; Coti Sorokin

Julieta Venegas chronology
Bueninvento (2000)	Sí (2003)	Limón y Sal (2006)

Singles from Sí
- 1. "Andar Conmigo" Released: 2003; 2. "Lento" Released: 2004; 3. "Algo Está Cambiando" Released: 2004; 4. "Oleada" Released: 2005

Professional ratings
Review scores
Source	Rating
AllMusic	3.5/5 stars

Sí ("Yes") is the third studio album by Mexican singer-songwriter Julieta Venegas. It was released on 18 November 2003, by Ariola and BMG. She co-produced the album with Cachorro López and Coti Sorokin. The album is considered Venegas’ mainstream breakthrough. After the album's success, it was re-released in 2005, including nine new tracks and a DVD. The album won the Latin Grammy Award for Best Rock Solo Vocal Album, and received a nomination for Grammy Award for Best Latin Rock/Alternative Album. The album has sold 3.5 million copies worldwide.

== Track listing ==
No.	Title	Writer(s)	Producer(s)	Length
1.	"Lento (Slow)"	Coti Sorokin, Julieta Venegas	Cachorro López, Julieta Venegas^	4:03
2.	"Andar Conmigo (To Go Out With Me)"	Sorokin, Venegas	López, Venegas	3:17
3.	"Algo Está Cambiando (Something Is Changing)"	Sorokin, Venegas	López, Venegas	4:04
4.	"A Tu Lado (By Your Side)"	Venegas	Sorokin, Venegas^	3:20
5.	"Lo Que Pidas (Whatever You Ask for)"	Sorokin, Venegas	Sorokin, Venegas	3:20
6.	"Mala Memoria (Bad Memory)"	Sorokin, López, Venegas	López, Venegas	3:06
7.	"Nada Serio (Nothing Serious)"	Venegas	Sorokin, Venegas	3:51
8.	"Donde Quiero Estar (Where I Want to Be)"	Venegas	Sorokin, Venegas	3:05
9.	"Alguien (Someone)"	Venegas	Sorokin, Venegas	3:44
10.	"Oleada (Tide)"	Sorokin, Venegas	López, Venegas	3:13

DVD
No.	Title	Length
11.	"De Mis Pasos" (Music Video)	3:17
12.	"Cómo Sé" (Music Video)	3:15
13.	"Sería Feliz" (Music Video)	3:25
14.	"Hoy No Quiero" (Music Video)	3:12
15.	"Amores Perros (Me Van A Matar)" (Music Video)	4:05
16.	"Andar Conmigo" (Music Video)	3:18

^ Co-producer

== Sí (Edición Especial) ==
Sí (Edición Especial)

Studio album by Julieta Venegas
- Released: April 4, 2005
- Genres: Rock, Latin pop
- Language: Spanish
- Label: RCA International
- Producers: Julieta Venegas, Cachorro López, Coti Sorokin

=== Track listing ===
No.	Title	Writer(s)	Length
1.	"Lento"	Sorokin, Venegas	4:03
2.	"Andar Conmigo"	Sorokin, Venegas	3:17
3.	"Algo Está Cambiando"	Sorokin, Venegas	4:04
4.	"A Tu Lado"	Venegas	3:20
5.	"Lo Que Pidas"	Sorokin, Venegas	3:20
6.	"Mala Memoria"	Sorokin, Venegas	3:06
7.	"Nada Serio"	Venegas	3:51
8.	"Donde Quiero Estar"	Venegas	3:05
9.	"Alguien"	Venegas	3:44
10.	"Oleada"	Sorokin, Venegas	3:13
11.	"El Listón de Tu Pelo" (feat. Pau Donés)	Montaner	3:37
12.	"Andar Conmigo" (Live)	Sorokin, Venegas	3:30
13.	"Mala Memoria" (Live)	Venegas	3:28
14.	"Sería Feliz" (Live)	Venegas	3:54
15.	"Como Sé" (Live)	Venegas	3:22
16.	"El Triste" (Live)	José José	4:51
17.	"Andar Conmigo" (De La Rivera Mix)	Venegas	4:40
18.	"Lo Que Pidas" (Mijangos House Mix)	Venegas	4:27
19.	"Lento" (Mijangos Bootleg Mix)	Sorokin, Venegas	4:51

DVD DualDisc & CD+DVD
No.	Title	Length
20.	"De Mis Pasos" (Music Video)	3:17
21.	"Cómo Sé" (Music Video)	3:15
22.	"Sería Feliz" (Music Video)	3:25
23.	"Hoy No Quiero" (Music Video)	3:12
24.	"Amores Perros (Me Van A Matar)" (Music Video)	4:05
25.	"Andar Conmigo" (Music Video)	3:18
26.	"Lento" (Music Video)	4:09
27.	"Algo Está Cambianddo" (Music Video)	4:01
28.	"Documental"	25:00

== Singles ==
- Andar Conmigo (2003)
- Lento (2004)
- Algo Está Cambiando (2004)
- Oleada (2005)

== Personnel ==
- Julieta Venegas - vocals, background vocals, accordion, drum machine, keyboards, acoustic guitar, electric guitar, piano
- Coti Sorokin - acoustic guitar, electric guitar, Bass guitar, vocals (background)
- Adrían Schinoff - keyboards, programming
- Matías Sorolin - slide guitar, vocals (background)
- Juan Blas Caballero - programming, keyboards, scratch
- Sebastían Schon - electric guitar, keyboards
- Cachorro López - bass guitar
- Javier Casalla - violin

=== Production ===
- Producers: Cachorro López, Coti Sorokin
- Co-producer: Julieta Venegas
- Engineers: Cachorro López, Coti Sorokin
- Mixing: César Sogbe
- Assistant mixing: Sebastián Schon
- Mastering: Don Tyler
- A&R direction: Guillermo Guitiérrez
- A&R coordination: Gilda Oropeza
- Photography: Eduardo Martí
- Design: Ros

== Charts and certifications ==
=== Weekly charts ===
Charts (2003–2005)	Peak position
Mexican Albums (Top 100 Mexico)	1
Spanish Albums (PROMUSICAE)	96
US Top Latin Albums (Billboard)	23
US Latin Pop Albums (Billboard)	4

=== Certifications and sales ===
Region	Certification	Certified units/sales
Argentina (CAPIF)	Gold	20,000^{^}
Chile	—	10,000
Mexico (AMPROFON)	2× Platinum+Gold	375,000^{^}
United States (RIAA)	2× Platinum (Latin)	200,000^{^}
^{^} Shipments figures based on certification alone.

== Awards ==
=== Latin Grammy Award ===
Year	Title	Result
2004
2004	Best Rock Solo Vocal	Won

=== Premios Oye! ===
Year	Title	Result
2004
2004	Main Spanish Record of the Year	Won
2004	Main Spanish Song of the Year by "Andar Conmigo"	Won
2004	Latin Rock Soloist or Group	Won

=== Grammy Award ===
Year	Title	Result
2005
2005	Best Alternative/Rock Album	Nominated

== Release history ==
Country	Date	Label
Mexico	November 11, 2003	BMG
Spain	November 11, 2003	BMG
United States	November 22, 2003	BMG
