= Quiero Verte Más =

Single by Francisca Valenzuela

from the album Buen Soldado
- Released: January 1, 2011
- Recorded: 2010
- Genre: Pop
- Length: 4:10
- Label: Feria Music
- Songwriter: Francisca Valenzuela
- Producers: Vicente Sanfuentes, Mocky

Francisca Valenzuela singles chronology
"Al Frío" (2010)	"Quiero Verte Más" (2011)	"'Que Sería"" (2011)

"Quiero Verte Más" is the first single from the second studio album Buen Soldado by American-born Chilean singer and songwriter Francisca Valenzuela. The song was released on January 1, 2011, in United States and Mexico in digital formats and was released in Chile on January 4, 2011.

== Release ==
The single was performed in live concerts by Valenzuela as early as 2009 across Chile and Mexico. The studio version was officially released on January 1, 2011, for digital download via iTunes and Amazon in North America, for Chile the song debuted in radios on January 4, 2011.

=== Promotion ===
Valenzuela performed the song on various Chilean TV shows including TV shows Animal Nocturno and Cadena Nacional in January 2011.

"Quiero Verte Más" was featured in soundtrack of Chilean soap opera Soltera otra vez.

== Writing and recording process ==
The track is a pop song, written entirely by Valenzuela in late 2009. Pre-production was done in Berlin, Germany with producers Vicente Sanfuentes and the Canadian Mocky who worked previously with Jamie Lidell, Jane Birkin, Peaches and Nikka Costa. The single, along with the rest of the album Buen Soldado, was recorded in Santiago in August 2010. It features recognizable instruments such as pianos, guitars, bass and drums.

== Reception ==
MTV Iggy classified the release as "It's a sign of good things to come. "Quiero Verte Mas" is an upbeat piano, vibraphone, and bass pop track track with a swingin' hand clap beat. Francisca sings with a raw, easy quality that sounds fit for American country songs. (But lets hope it doesn't come to that!) And just to show you she's serious, Francisca, 23, even dropped her girlish glitz and got all grown up on the single cover.".

== Music video ==
The music video was filmed in Santiago at the Torre Entel during the second week of January 2011. It was released on February 9, 2011.

== Track listing ==
Digital Download Single

1. "Quiero Verte Más" (Album Version) – 4:10

== Chart performance ==
Chart (2011)	Peak position
Chile (Top 100 Singles Chart)	17

== Release history and radio add dates ==
=== Release history ===
Region	Date	Format
United States	January 1, 2011	Digital download
Mexico	January 1, 2011	Digital download

=== Radio add dates ===
Region	Date	Format
Chile	January 4, 2011	Mainstream airplay
