= Austin TV =

Mexican instrumental post-rock band

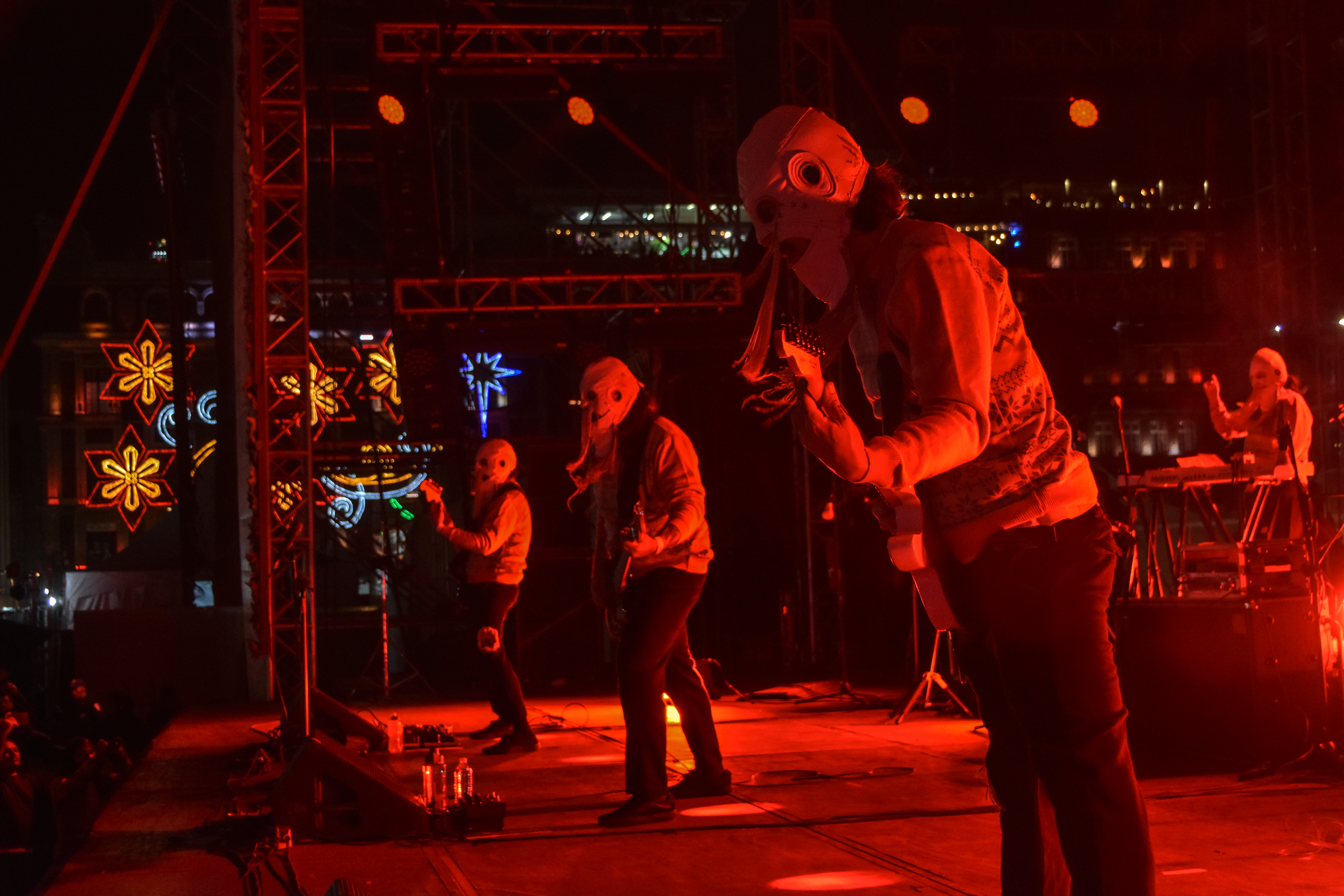

Background information
- Origin: Mexico City, Mexico
- Genres: Instrumental Rock, Post-rock
- Years active: (2001 – 2011) (2022-)
- Label: Terrícolas Imbéciles
- Members: Rata; Xna Yer; Chiosan; Totore; Acky
- Past members: Chato; Pasa; Chavo

Austin TV is an instrumental post-rock band formed in 2001 in Mexico City. Austin TV creates sonic landscapes with their music without lyrics. They have opened for groups like Yo La Tengo in Mexico and Café Tacuba in the U.S. leg of their 2007 tour, and have released three LPs, one EP and appearances in many Mexican independent bands compilations. Like The Residents or Devo, the group usually performs on stage with masks, disguises and uniforms. Concealing their identity in this way personifies their motto: "Your face is not important. The truth is inside".

Austin TV has shared the stage with many important bands of the Mexican scene, as well as international bands such as Mogwai, Tristeza, the Album Leaf and Incubus, among others. They have played at very important festivals like Vive Latino, Zero Fest, Motorokr Fest, SXSW, Personal Fest in Argentina, Manifest, Festival Cervantino, LAMC in New York, Coachella Valley Music and Arts Festival, and recently at the Rock al Parque Fest in Colombia, and "Quitofest" in Ecuador. They have also opened at the Aragon Ballroom in Chicago.

After reuniting in 2022, they released their fifth album, Rizoma, on September 28, 2023.

In 2024, to mark the 21st anniversary of La última noche del mundo, in addition to releasing remastered versions of the album, the band played a series of five shows at the Foro Alicia in Mexico City, performing the entire album and a few other songs from their other albums, depending on the day.

In 2026, the band released a series of singles from its album MA. The album was not made available in its entirely on streaming platforms and material form it was scheduled to be performed at intimate concerts in the United States, Europe and Mexico.

== Members ==
- Chiosan (keyboards and samplers)
- Rata (bass) – A former member of the Mexican emo-punk band Spandex
- Xna Yer (drums – beat box and kaoss pad) – Former member of punk rock band Hulespuma and current member of hardcore punk / post-hardcore band Dolores De Huevos since 2013.
- Totore (guitar)
- Acky (guitar) – He joined the band after the comeback was announced

Guest Members

- Josué "Hobbit mayor" Ortíz (guitar @ Los Perros Predicen Temblores concert)

Former Members

- Chavo (guitar) – He officially left the band after comeback was announced
- Chato (guitar, left the band after Coachella 2008 and a few more concerts)
- Pasa (bass, left the band in 2003)
- Isra de Viana - Zaiya (guitar, left the band in 2003)

== Indie-O Music Awards ==
On June 11, 2008, Austin TV received four awards at the Indie-O Music Awards, the first awards created to recognize the best of the independent music scene in Mexico. The categories from which they received an award were:

- People's choice
- Best punk & subgenre album
- Best album's art design (Trevore Valenzuela & Marcos Castro's art)
- Best band of the year.

== Coachella 2008 ==
During the presentation of Fontana Bella in Mexico City (in late October, 2007), the band's manager, Carlos "Jiju" Ruiz announced that the band was confirmed to be playing at Coachella Valley Music and Arts Festival, an American festival held in Indio, CA.

Taking advantage of this, they prepared a California U.S. tour with five previous dates to Coachella.

The dates were:

- April 19: Tijuana BC, Mex. @ Multiculti
- April 20: Chulavista CA, USA.
- April 21: Pomona CA, USA @ Glasshouse
- April 23: Oxnard CA, USA.
- April 24: Sn. Jose CA, USA.

== Los Perros Predicen Temblores concert ==
This special show, translated in English "Dogs can predict earthquakes", was held at one of the most important theaters in Mexico City, the Teatro Metropolitan on August 29, 2008. Having a completely "sold out" date since the 1st week of tickets release, the show was theatrically performed by the band using a xoloitzcuintle dog disguise and had actors, real xoloitzcuintle dogs running around the stage, choreography dancers and special guest musicians such as Emmanuel "Meme" del Real, member of Cafe Tacuba, playing the acoustic guitar and keyboards and the violinist "Alegre". Meme also had a special feature in their LP presentation Fontana Bella at the Pabellon de Alta Tecnologia in Mexico City on October 1, 2007. Josue "Hobbit mayor" Ortiz, from the band Vicente Gayo, played the guitar replacing Chato.

== Discography ==
LP

- La última noche del mundo - November 2003
- Asrael (B-sides and live tracks) - August 2004
- Fontana Bella - May 2007
- Caballeros del Albedrio - 2011
- Rizoma - September 2023
- MA - 2026

EP

- Austin TV EP - September 2002
- Indra - May 2025

Live DVD

- Temblaban con Sonata Solitaria - July 2006

Appearances

- "Aimee Observó el Cielo" Prueba Esto 2 (Compilation) - June 2003
- "Valiente" México Suena en Los Ángeles (Compilation) - February 2004
- "Les Choses Sont Bizarres" Nuevos Tiempos Viejos Amigos (Compilation) - August 2005
- "Dos Tardes de Mi Vida" Todos Somos Rigo (Compilation) - March 2006
- "Aviéntame" Tributo a Caifanes (Compilation) - November 2010
