= Buen Soldado =

Studio album by Francisca Valenzuela
- Released: March 3, 2011 (Chile)
- Recorded: August 2010 at Estudios Atómica in Santiago, Chile.
- Genre: Pop, pop rock, jazz, folk
- Length: 47:04
- Label: Feria Music; Sony Music
- Producer: Vicente Sanfuentes, Mocky, & Francisca Valenzuela

Francisca Valenzuela chronology
Muérdete La Lengua (2007)	Buen Soldado (2011)	Tajo Abierto (2014)

Singles from Buen Soldado
- 1. "Quiero Verte Más" Released: January 1, 2011; 2. "Que Sería" Released: June 14, 2011; 3. "En Mi Memoria" Released: November 7, 2011; 4. "Buen Soldado" Released: April 30, 2012

Buen Soldado (Good Soldier in English) is the second studio album by Chilean-American singer-songwriter Francisca Valenzuela. Feria Music released it on March 3, 2011 in Chile. The bilingual artist achieved success in both North and South America with her debut album, 2007's Muérdete la Lengua. She wrote and recorded the album while taking a gap year from her collegiate studies in Santiago. The album was preceded by the upbeat lead single "Quiero Verte Más" (I Want To See You More Often), which was released on January 1, 2011. The song's brisk mix of pop, folk and 1960s go-go presaged the album's lighthearted tone. The album was certified gold in Chile in January 2013 for sales of 5,000 copies or more.

== Production ==
Francisca began the process of writing for her second album in mid 2008 to early 2009. In 2010, pre-production was done in Berlin, Germany for two months (touring and the production phase of the album forced Valenzuela to put her Journalism studies at the Universidad Católica in Santiago on hold for a year.). While in Europe, Valenzuela produced a lot of songs with the producer and DJ Vicente Sanfuentes, who has worked with several groups and emerging Chilean artists like Los Mono, Gepe and Hermanos Brothers. The album was also recorded and produced in Santiago in August 2010. Production group joined the Canadian producer Mocky, who produced songs for Jamie Lidell, Jane Birkin, Peaches and Nikka Costa.

=== Recording and writing process ===
"We were putting together the songs organically....and I think that exploration is reflected in the colors that the album is in the range of textures."

— Francisca Valenzuela on the conception of Buen Soldado

In August 2010, Valenzuela returned to Santiago, Chile, to start the recording the album at the Atomic studios in Santiago, Chile, with the technical control engineer Gonzalo "Chalo" Gonzalez and Camilo Salinas collaborations on the Hammond organ and Pablo Ilabaca, member of the Chilean band Chancho en Piedra in electric guitars. The album contains songs with recognizable instruments such as pianos, guitars, bass and drums. Francisca said that is not a very experimental album, but also explores new sounds and rhythms unlike her debut album, Muérdete La Lengua, and is of more groove and dance, with greater inclusion of new ringtones synthesizers on some tracks. The general tone of the album is much more fun and there are slow songs. Also includes folk songs and other slow, dark, with shades of jazz. Valenzuela says that an album is more varied and mature, changing the feminist side of her debut album now even include topics from the perspective of a man, and political or social opinions. The album contains 12 Spanish songs, all written and composed by Francisca Valenzuela.

== Track listing ==
All tracks are written by Francisca Valenzuela.

No.	Title	Length
1.	"Buen Soldado"	3:41
2.	"Quiero Verte Más"	4:12
3.	"Corazón"	4:06
4.	"Mujer Modelo"	3:13
5.	"Que Sería"	3:25
6.	"Los Que Siempre Arrancan"	3:26
7.	"En Mi Memoria"	4:11
8.	"Entrevista"	4:05
9.	"Esta Soy Yo"	3:18
10.	"Crónica"	5:00
11.	"Yo Lo Busco"	4:33
12.	"Salvador"	4:32

== Release history ==
Country	Date	Label	Format(s)
Chile	March 3, 2011	Feria Music	CD/Digital download
Colombia	September 10, 2011	Sony Music Colombia	Digital download
United States	August 9, 2011	Columbia Records, Sony Music	Digital download
Mexico	October 25, 2011	Sony Music Entertainment México	Digital download

== Album trivia ==
- "Salvador" (Savior) was written in late October 2008 and released as a demo to fans via Valenzuela's Myspace page. It was written as a homage to former Chilean president, Salvador Allende.
