= World Circus (circus) =

World Circus (or Monde du Cirque, Zirkuswelt) is a Swiss itinerant event centered on the circus arts, created in 1984 by Youri Messen-Jaschin. It presents all aspects of the circus, from its archeological creation to the most contemporary forms.

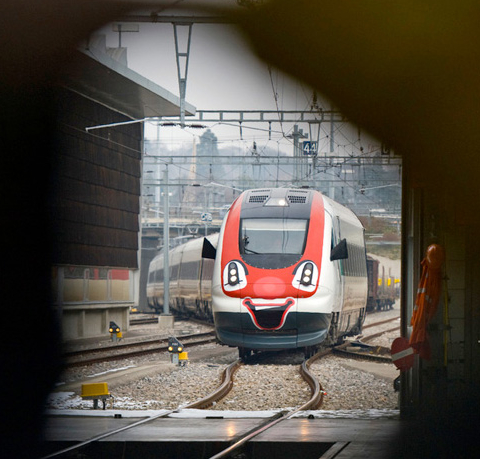
Swiss Railway ICN clown ornament for Geneva 2010

== Presentation ==
The duration of each event lasts between nine and twelve months in each town. It receives thousands of spectators and proposes shows of acrobats, jugglers, tightrope walkers, fakirs, clowns, musicians, animal tamers, magicians, contemporary dancers, opera, the magic of the light, winging, circus parades, mimes, from cosmic spectacle to informatics, science and physic of the circus. Bringing more than thousand artists from Switzerland and the whole world, with almost as much means of expression, it encompasses a town in the beauty of discovery for a whole year.

The main task of « World Circus » is to open a new way in the creative art and urbanism. This event offers, among others, a wider interest for the public's curiosity for the contemporary creation and new technologies. It is motivated by the irreversible development of a visual thought more and more present in different domains of scientifically knowledge, industrial production and visual creation, as well the practical, industrial and cultural innovations of communication.

The benefit of the event is entirely dedicated to a humanitarian project.

== Bibliography ==
=== Books ===
- 1987 : Yakari, World Circus N°. 153
  - Yakari, Tout le monde du cirque à Lausanne N°. 153;
- 1989 : Le cirque à l'Affiche Editions Gilles Attinger - Hauterive | Switzerland | ISBN 2-88256-037-0
- 1991 : Lausanne palace History and chronicles (75 years of a prestigious hotel) Presses Centrales Lausanne SA, Lausanne/Switzerland;
- Literatur - Unterhaltung () (1985–1989);
- 2010 : Le Cirque piste de lecture Editor Municipal Library Geneva 2010
- 2010 : Le Chapiteau imaginaire(Editor Library Carouge);
- 2010 : A Horizontal Chinese scroll from the Yuan Dynasty (1279-1368)(Editor : Guy & Myriam Ullens Foundation Geneva) (ISBN 978-2-8399-0724-8);

=== Poster Award World Circus ===
- 1987 World Circus Lausanne 87, poster award from the Federal Department of the Interior Bern Switzerland
- 2010 World Circus Geneva 2010, poster award from the Swiss Poster Award
