= Vía X =

Chilean pay television channel

- Country: Chile
- Headquarters: Chucre Manzur 15, Providencia, Santiago de Chile

Programming
- Language: Spanish
- Picture format: 1080i HDTV (downscaled to 16:9 480i for the SDTV feed)

Ownership
- Owner: TVI Filmocentro Televisión
- Key people: Luis Venegas (CEO of TVI); Paulo Venegas (Programming Director)
- Sister channels: Zona Latina; ARTV; Via X 2; Docu

History
- Launched: October 7, 1994

Links
- Website: canalviax.com

Vía X is a Chilean subscription television channel founded in 1994, and operated by the production company Filmocentro Televisión and owned by TVI Filmocentro. Airing mostly rock music videos, it features Chilean indie subculture, as well as entertainment, politics and news programs.

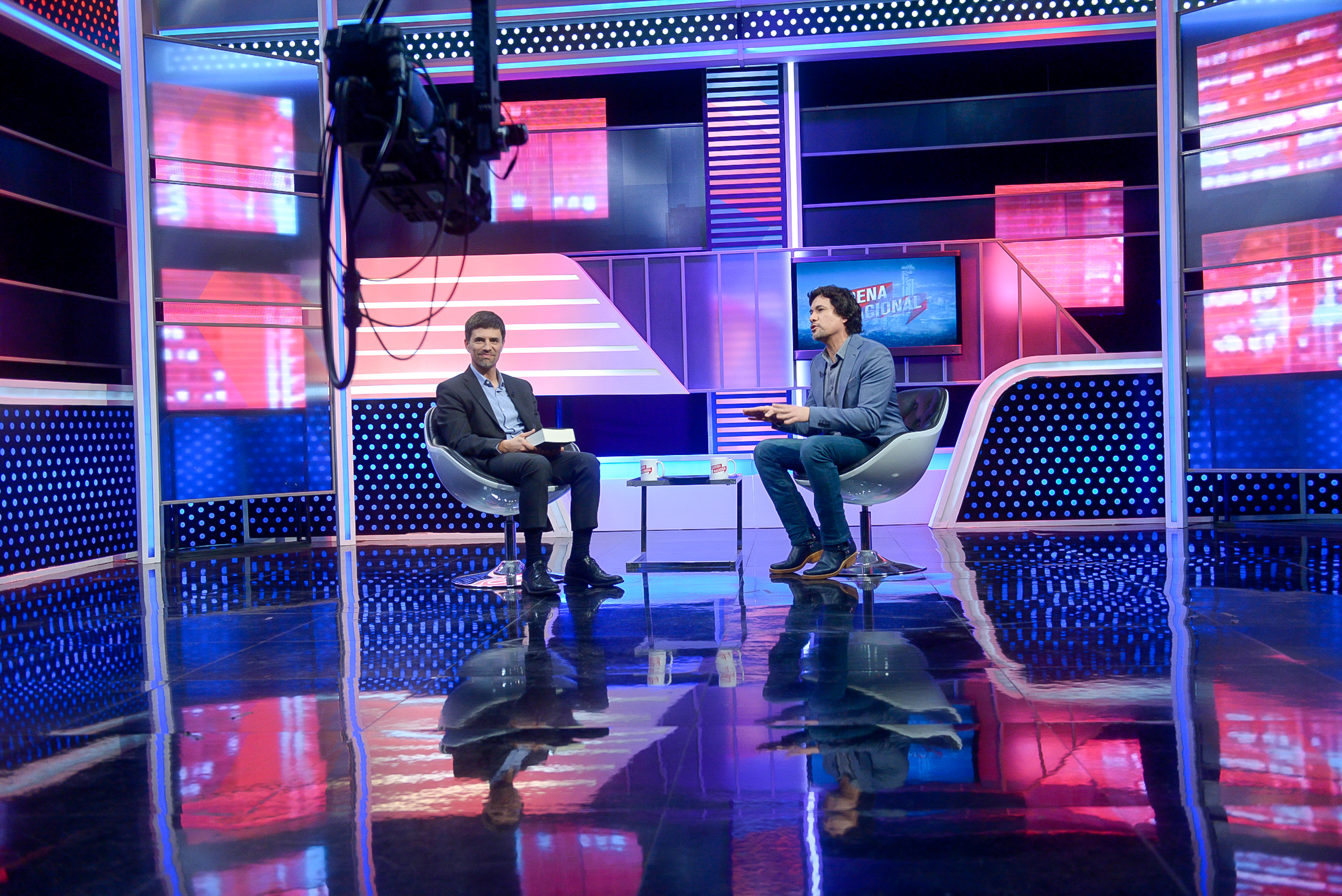
Recording of Cadena nacional (television program), a popular program of the channel.

== See also ==
- List of Chilean television channels
