= Coti =

Argentine musician and composer

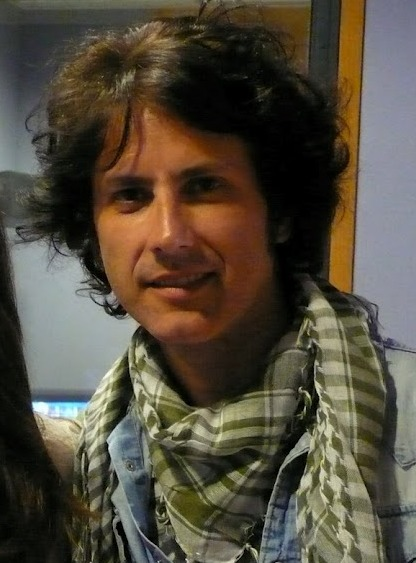
- Coti in 2012

Background information
- Born: Roberto Fidel Ernesto Sorokin Espasa; June 14, 1973 (age 53)
- Origin: Rosario, Santa Fe, Argentina
- Genres: Latin pop; pop rock
- Occupations: Singer; songwriter; musician
- Instruments: Vocals; guitars; keyboards
- Label: Universal Music
- Partner: Lelé (2020–2022)
- Website: http://www.cotioficial.com

Roberto Fidel Ernesto Sorokin Esparza (born June 14, 1973), known professionally as Coti, is an Argentine singer, songwriter, and musician. He is best known for collaborations with other Spanish-language artists like Andrés Calamaro, Julieta Venegas, Natalia Oreiro and Luis Miguel in his last album. His 2005 release, Esta Mañana y Otros Cuentos went gold in both Argentina and Mexico, while going double platinum in Spain.

== Life and career ==
Roberto Fidel Ernesto Sorokin Esparza was born in Rosario, Santa Fe, though he moved to Concordia, Entre Ríos at the age of three. Upon returning to Rosario, he joined the group Luz Mala, which recorded an album.

In the late 1990s, Coti penned songs for Andrés Calamaro, Julieta Venegas, Paulina Rubio, Natalia Oreiro, Los Enanitos Verdes, Diego Torres, and Alejandro Lerner. Striking out on his own, he released his first album, Coti, in Spain, getting enough air time from the single "Antes que ver el sol" to secure him a spot as the opening act for the Spanish stop of Shakira's 2003 tour, Tour of the Mongoose. He was a co-writer of songs in Julieta Venegas's Latin Grammy winning album Sí and Grammy album and Latin Grammy winning, Limón y Sal.

In 2009, Coti appeared in a music video with Maxi Rodríguez, former player Diego Forlán, and Cerezo Osaka respectively. In 2024 he collaborated with the Spanish singer Ana Guerra on the song "Canción de Luto".

== Discography ==
- Coti (2002)
- Canciones Para Llevar (2004)
- Esta Mañana y Otros Cuentos (2005)
- Gatos y Palomas (2007)
- Malditas Canciones (2009)
- Lo dije por boca de otro (2012)
- Que Esperas (2015)
- Tanta Magia (En Vivo En El Gran Rex) (2015)
