= Los Bunkers =

Chilean rock band

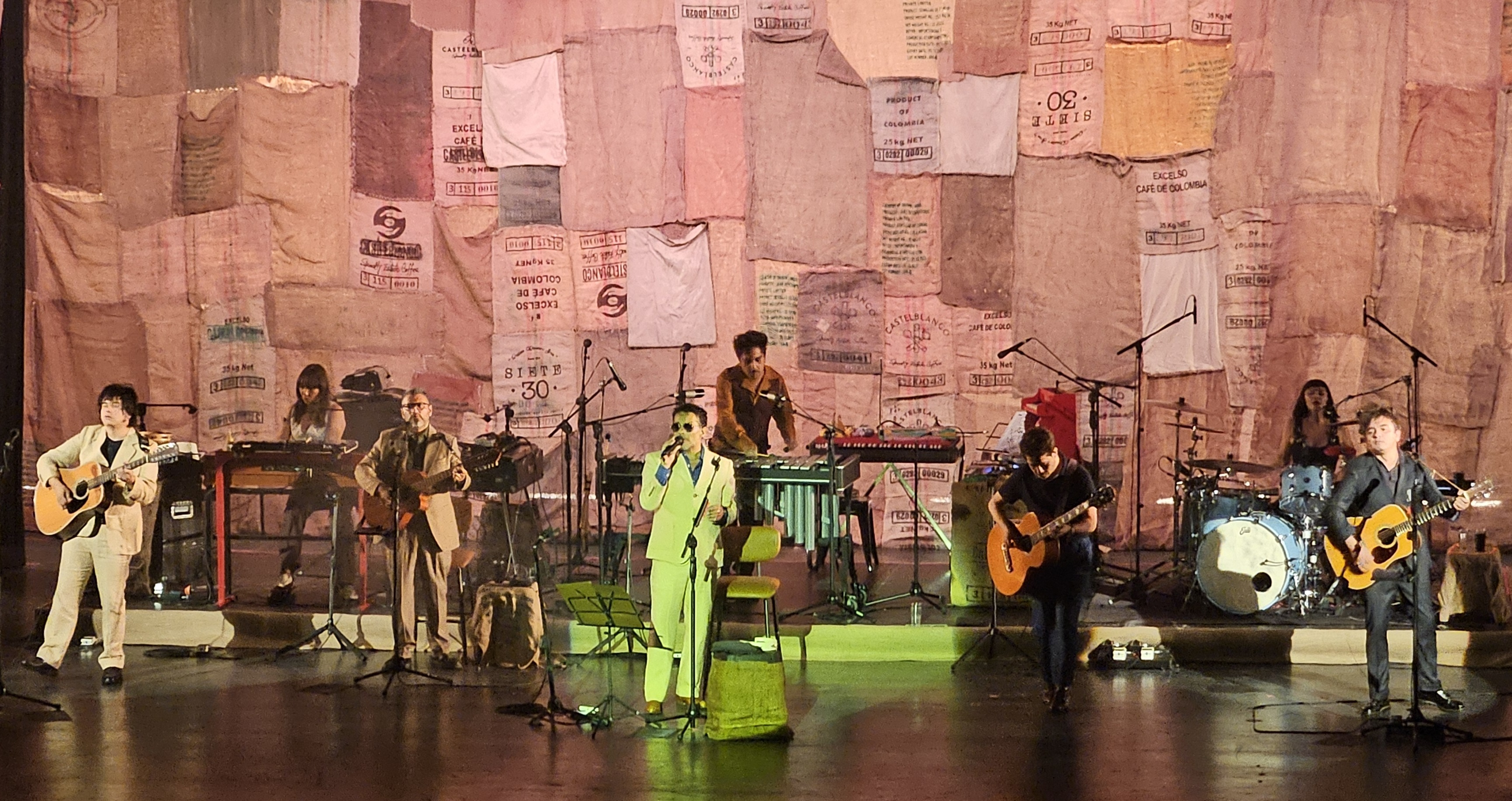
- Los Bunkers at the Municipal Theatre in Viña del Mar in 2025

Background information
- Origin: Concepción, Biobío, Chile
- Genres: Alternative rock, indie rock, folk rock
- Years active: 1999–2014; 2022–present
- Labels: Big Sur Records (2001); Columbia/Sony Music (2002–2003); La Oreja/Feria Music (2005–2007); Universal Music (2008–2012); Evolución/OCESA Seitrack (2012–present)
- Members: Álvaro López; Mauricio Durán; Francisco Durán; Gonzalo López; CancaMusa
- Past members: Manuel Lagos; Mauricio Basualto
- Website: www.losbunkers.cl

Los Bunkers (Spanish for The Bunkers) is an alternative rock band from Concepción, Chile, formed in 1999 by brothers Álvaro and Gonzalo López, Mauricio Basualto, and brothers Francisco and Mauricio Durán.

They are well known in their country for their contemporary sounds of rock, based on sounds of the 1960s, from bands like The Beatles, and also including sounds from their folk roots. The band name is essentially a play on words that at the simplest level recalls Chilean rock groups of the 1960s like Los Jokers and Los Sonnys. The use of the letter B and K was also considered to be desirable by the band as it aligned themselves with some of their biggest music idols such as The Beatles and The Kinks. Finally the word Bunkers is also symbolic of the refuge that the band and music had become against all that surrounded them.

== History ==
Initially coming together because of their shared love for The Beatles, Los Bunkers have shown a growing interest in writing songs based on Chilean folk roots, especially those from the 1960s movement of the New Chilean Song. Out of these two related creative influences, the band makes music which can be linked with classic rock, but with a new freshness, alongside flexibility that has allowed them to maintain a healthy production of new albums.

Los Bunkers is one of the three Chilean groups to appear at the Festival Lollapalooza Chicago 2011. They also appeared in Lollapalooza Chile the same year.

== Members ==
=== Current members ===
- Francisco Durán – vocals, keyboards, synthesizers, rhythm guitar (1999–2014, 2019, 2022–present)
- Mauricio Durán – lead guitar, keyboards, synthesizers, backing vocals (1999–2014, 2019, 2022–present)
- Gonzalo López – bass, backing vocals (1999–2014, 2019, 2022–present)
- Cancamusa (Natalia Pérez) – drums, percussion (2024–present)

=== Former members ===
- Manuel Lagos – drums (1999–2000)
- Mauricio Basualto – drums, percussion (2000–2014, 2019, 2022–2024)

== Discography ==
=== Studio albums ===
- Los Bunkers (2001)
- Canción de Lejos (2002)
- La Culpa (2003)
- Vida de Perros (2005)
- Barrio Estación (2008)
- Música Libre (2010)
- La Velocidad de la Luz (2013)
- Antología (2017)
- Noviembre (2023)

=== Extended plays ===
- Jamás (2000)

=== Compilations ===
- Singles 2001-2006 (2007)

=== Live albums ===
- En Vivo (2006)
- Los Bunkers, Live in Concert (2007)
- At The Roxy (Gran Reserva Vol. 1) (2022)
- Los Bunkers MTV Unplugged (2024)

=== Singles ===
Year	Song	Album
2000	"El Detenido"	Los Bunkers
2000	"Fantasías Animadas de Ayer y Hoy"	Los Bunkers
2001	"Entre Mis Brazos"	Los Bunkers
2001	"Yo Sembré Mis Penas de Amor en tu Jardín"	Los Bunkers
2002	"Miño"	Canción de Lejos
2002	"Las Cosas Que Cambié y Dejé Por Ti"	Canción de Lejos
2002	"Pobre Corazón"	Canción de Lejos
2003	"Canción de Lejos"	Canción de Lejos
2003	"No Me Hables de Sufrir"	La Culpa
2003	"Canción Para Mañana"	La Culpa
2004	"La Exiliada del Sur"	La Culpa
2004	"Cura de Espanto"	La Culpa
2005	"Ven Aquí"	Vida de Perros
2005	"Llueve Sobre la Ciudad"	Vida de Perros
2006	"Ahora Que No Estás"	Vida de Perros
2006	"Miéntele"	Vida de Perros
2007	"Y Volveré"	Vida de Perros
2008	"Deudas"	Barrio Estación
2008	"Me Muelen A Palos"	Barrio Estación
2008	"Nada Nuevo Bajo El Sol"	Barrio Estación
2009	"Fiesta"	Barrio Estación
2009	"Una Nube Cuelga Sobre Mí"	Barrio Estación
2010	"Sueño Con Serpientes"	Música Libre
2010	"Quién Fuera"	Música Libre
2011	"Angel Para Un Final"	Música Libre
2011	"Santiago de Chile"	Música Libre
2011	"La Era Está Pariendo Un Corazón"	Música Libre
2013	"Bailando Solo"	La velocidad de la luz
2013	"Si estás pensando mal de mí"	La velocidad de la luz
2023	"Rey"	Noviembre
