= List of songs recorded by Julieta Venegas =

Julieta Venegas Songs

== Songs ==
Key
| • | Indicates songs recorded for soundtracks |

Name of song, writers, originating album, and year released.
| Song | Artist(s) | Writer(s) | Album | Year | Ref. |
|---|---|---|---|---|---|
| "¿Por qué?" | Julieta Venegas | Julieta Venegas | Los Momentos | 2013 | |
| "¿Quién es más poderoso el aire o el fuego?" | Los Delinqüentes feat. Julieta Venegas | | Bienvenidos a la Época Iconoclasta | 2009 | |
| "A callarse" | Julieta Venegas | Pablo Neruda | Neruda en el Corazón | 2004 | |
| "A donde sea" | Julieta Venegas | Julieta Venegas | Limón y Sal | 2006 | |
| "A tu lado" | Julieta Venegas | Julieta Venegas | Sí | 2003 | |
| "Abel" | Julieta Venegas | Julieta Venegas | Non-album single | 2003 | |
| "Acaríciame" | Julieta Venegas (solo) & Nacho Mastretta (duet) | Alejandro Jaén | Demasiado Amor (Música Original de la Película) | 2001 | |
| "Algo está cambiando" | Julieta Venegas | Coti Sorokin; Julieta Venegas | Sí | 2003 | |
| "Algo fue mio" | Julieta Venegas | Julieta Venegas | Capadocia: Un Lugar Sin Perdón (Soundtrack Original de la Serie) | 2008 | |
| "Algo sucede" | Julieta Venegas | Julieta Venegas | Algo Sucede | 2015 | |
| "Alguien" | Julieta Venegas | Julieta Venegas | Sí | 2003 | |
| "Algún día" | Julieta Venegas feat. Gustavo Santaolalla | Julieta Venegas | MTV Unplugged | 2008 | |
| "Alien vs Predator" | Iván Ferreiro feat. Julieta Venegas | | Val Miñor - Madrid / Historia Y Cronología Del Mundo | 2013 | |
| "Alivio" | Julieta Venegas | Julieta Venegas | Non-album single | 2015 | |
| "Amores perros me van a matar" | Julieta Venegas | Julieta Venegas | Amores Perros (Música Original de la Película) | 2000 | |
| "Amores platónicos" | Julieta Venegas | Julieta Venegas | Otra Cosa | 2010 | |
| "Andamos huyendo" | Julieta Venegas | Julieta Venegas | Aquí | 1997 | |
| "Andar conmigo" | Julieta Venegas | Coti Sorokin; Julieta Venegas | Sí | 2003 | |
| "Antes" | Julieta Venegas | Julieta Venegas | Aquí | 1997 | |
| "Antes y después de la vida" | Julieta Venegas | | Hecho en México (Soundtrack por Duncan Bridgeman) | 2012 | |
| "Aquí sigo" | Julieta Venegas | Julieta Venegas; Emilio Aragón | Non-album single | 2014 | |
| "Arbolito de Navidad" | Julieta Venegas, Tommy Torres & Rayito | José Barros | En Mi País | 2004 | |
| "Ay" | Julieta Venegas | | En el País de No Pasa Nada (Banda Sonora) | 2000 | |
| "Bajo otra luz" | Nelly Furtado & Julieta Venegas & La Mala Rodríguez | Julieta Venegas; La Mala Rodríguez | Mi Plan | 2009 | |
| "Bestia (Julieta Venegas Remix)" | Hello Seahorse! & Julieta Venegas (chorus) | Lo Blondo | Bestia | 2009 | |
| "Bien o mal" | Julieta Venegas | Julieta Venegas; Alejandro Sergi | Otra Cosa | 2010 | |
| "Buenas noches, desolación" | Julieta Venegas | Julieta Venegas; Alejandro Sergi Cachorro López | Algo Sucede | 2015 | |
| "Bueninvento" | Julieta Venegas | Julieta Venegas | Bueninvento | 2000 | |
| "Caminando a la fábrica" | Alex Anwandter feat. Julieta Venegas | Alex Anwandter | Amiga | 2017 | |
| "Canción de cuna" | Julieta Venegas | Julieta Venegas | La Increíble Historia del Niño de Piedra (Banda Sonora) | 2015 | |
| "Canciones de amor" | Julieta Venegas | Julieta Venegas | Limón y Sal | 2006 | |
| "Capullito de alheli" | Eugenia León feat. Julieta Venegas | | Ciudadana del Mundo Volumen 2 | 2013 | |
| "Casa abandonada" | Julieta Venegas | Julieta Venegas | Bueninvento | 2000 | |
| "Chikero Bombay" | Liquits & Julieta Venegas (chorus) | | Todo El Poder (Banda Sonora) | 1999 | |
| "Cómo sé" | Julieta Venegas | Julieta Venegas | Aquí | 1997 | |
| "Con su propia voz" | Julieta Venegas | Julieta Venegas | Aquí | 1997 | |
| "Corazón" | Julieta Venegas | Julieta Venegas | La Increíble Historia del Niño de Piedra (Banda Sonora) | 2015 | |
| "Corre, dijo la tortuga" | Julieta Venegas | Antonio Gª De Diego; Joaquín Sabina | ...Entre Todas Las Mujeres | 2003 | |
| "De mis pasos" | Julieta Venegas | Julieta Venegas | Aquí | 1997 | |
| "De qué me sirve" | Julieta Venegas | Julieta Venegas; Coti Sorokin | Limón y Sal | 2006 | |
| "Debajo de mi lengua" | Julieta Venegas | Julieta Venegas; Adrián Dárgelos | Otra Cosa | 2010 | |
| "Despedida" | Julieta Venegas | Julieta Venegas | Otra Cosa | 2010 | |
| "Disco eterno" | Julieta Venegas | Gustavo Cerati; Zeta Bosio; Charly Alberti | (Soda Stereo) Tributo | 2001 | |
| "Distancias" | Makiza feat. Julieta Venegas | | Casino Royale | 2005 | |
| "Donde quiero estar" | Julieta Venegas | Julieta Venegas | Sí | 2003 | |
| "Dos soledades" | Julieta Venegas | Julieta Venegas | Algo Sucede | 2015 | |
| "Duda" | Julieta Venegas | Julieta Venegas | Otra Cosa | 2010 | |
| "Dulce compañía" | Julieta Venegas | Julieta Venegas | Limón y Sal | 2006 | |
| "El día que me quieras" | Marcelo Ezquiaga feat. Julieta Venegas | | Morocho - Homenaje a Carlos Gardel | 2016 | |
| "El dolor del micro" | Cartel de Santa feat. Julieta Venegas | | Vol. II | 2004 | |
| "El fuego y el combustible" | Julieta Venegas | Jorge Drexler | Hotel Tívoli (Banda Sonora) | 2007 | |
| "El ladrón" | Sonora Santanera feat. Julieta Venegas | | La Sonora Santanera En Su 60 Aniversario | 2016 | |
| "El listón de tu pelo" | Julieta Venegas, Pau Donés, & El Sonidero Nacional | Jorge Mejía Avante | Asesino En Serio (Música Original De La Película) | 2003 | |
| "El presente" | Julieta Venegas | Julieta Venegas | MTV Unplugged | 2008 | |
| "El sueño del caimán" | Mastretta feat. Julieta Venegas | | El Sueño Del Caimán (Banda Sonora) | 2000 | |
| "El triste" | Julieta Venegas | Roberto Cantoral | Un Tributo | 1998 | |
| "Enero y abril" | Julieta Venegas | Julieta Venegas | Bueninvento | 2000 | |
| "Eres para mí" | Julieta Venegas feat. Anita Tijoux | Julieta Venegas; Anamaría Tijoux | Limón y Sal | 2006 | |
| "Eres para mí" (Note: Venegas re-recorded "Eres para mí" with new lyrics for her live album, MTV Unplugged.) | Julieta Venegas feat. La Mala Rodríguez | Julieta Venegas; Anamaría Tijoux; María Rodríguez Garrido | MTV Unplugged | 2008 | |
| "Ese camino" | Julieta Venegas | Julieta Venegas | Algo Sucede | 2015 | |
| "Esperaba" | Julieta Venegas | Julieta Venegas | Algo Sucede | 2015 | |
| "Esta vez" | Julieta Venegas | Julieta Venegas | Aquí | 1997 | |
| "Eterno" | Julieta Venegas | Julieta Venegas | Otra Cosa | 2010 | |
| "Explosión" | Julieta Venegas | Julieta Venegas | Algo Sucede | 2015 | |
| "Fe" | Julieta Venegas | Julieta Venegas | Bueninvento | 2000 | |
| "Flor" | Julieta Venegas | Julieta Venegas | Bueninvento | 2000 | |
| "Florentina" | Julieta Venegas & Yamil Rezc | Julieta Venegas & Yamil Rezc | La Vida Inmoral de la Pareja Ideal (Banda Sonora) | 2016 | |
| "Fotografías" | Julieta Venegas & Yamil Rezc | Julieta Venegas & Yamil Rezc | La Vida Inmoral de la Pareja Ideal (Banda Sonora) | 2016 | |
| "Hermanas" | Julieta Venegas & Yamil Rezc | Julieta Venegas & Yamil Rezc | La Vida Inmoral de la Pareja Ideal (Banda Sonora) | 2016 | |
| "Hoy" | Julieta Venegas | Julieta Venegas | Los Momentos | 2013 | |
| "Hoy no quiero" | Julieta Venegas | Julieta Venegas | Bueninvento | 2000 | |
| "Hu Hu Hu" | Natalia Lafourcade feat. Julieta Venegas | Natalia Lafourcade | Hu Hu Hu | 2009 | |
| "Ilusión" | Julieta Venegas feat. Marisa Monte | Julieta Venegas; Marisa Monte; Arnaldo Antunes | MTV Unplugged | 2008 | |
| "Instantánea" | Julieta Venegas | Julieta Venegas | Bueninvento | 2000 | |
| "La espera" | El Señor González y Los Cuates de la Chamba & Julieta Venegas | | Nadie Te Oye: Perfume De Violetas | 2001 | |
| "La jaula de oro" | Julieta Venegas | Enrique Franco Aguilar | El Mas Grande Homenaje A Los Tigres Del Norte | 2001 | |
| "Lágrimas negras" | Otto feat. Julieta Venegas | | Certa Manhã Acordei de Sonhos Intranquilos | 2009 | |
| "Lento" | Julieta Venegas | Coti Sorokin; Julieta Venegas | Sí | 2003 | |
| "Lento" | Érika Martins feat. Julieta Venegas & Jorge Villamizar | Coti Sorokin; Julieta Venegas; Érika Martins; Gabriel Thomaz | Érika Martins | 2009 | |
| "Libertad" | Julieta Venegas | Julieta Venegas | Aquí | 1997 | |
| "Limón y sal" | Julieta Venegas | Julieta Venegas; Jorge Villamizar | Limón y Sal | 2006 | |
| "Lo que pedí" | Julieta Venegas | | En el País de No Pasa Nada (Banda Sonora) | 2000 | |
| "Lo que pidas" | Julieta Venegas | Julieta Venegas | Sí | 2003 | |
| "Lo que tú me das" | Anita Tijoux & Julieta Venegas | Julieta Venegas; Anamaría Tijoux | Sub Terra (Banda Sonora) | 2003 | |
| "Lo que venga después" | Julieta Venegas | Julieta Venegas | María, Llena Eres de Gracia (Banda Sonora) | 2004 | |
| "Los momentos" | Julieta Venegas | Julieta Venegas | Los Momentos | 2013 | |
| "Luna de miel" | Mastretta feat. Julieta Venegas | Nacho Mastretta | Luna De Miel | 2000 | |
| "Mala leche" | Julieta Venegas | | En el País de No Pasa Nada (Banda Sonora) | 2000 | |
| "Mala memoria" | Julieta Venegas | Coti Sorokin; Julieta Venegas | Sí | 2003 | |
| "Me voy" | Julieta Venegas | Julieta Venegas | Limón y Sal | 2006 | |
| "Mi principio" | Julieta Venegas | Joselo Rangel | Quemar Las Naves (Banda Sonora) | 2007 | |
| "Miedo" | Lenine feat. Julieta Venegas | Lenine; Pedro Guerra; Rodney Dassis | Acústico MTV | 2006 | |
| "Miel con veneno" | Julieta Venegas | Joselo Rangel | Quemar Las Naves (Banda Sonora) | 2007 | |
| "Mientes" | El Guincho feat. Julieta Venegas | Miguel Matamoros | Piratas De Sudamérica, Vol. 1 | 2010 | |
| "Mira la vida" | Julieta Venegas | Julieta Venegas | MTV Unplugged | 2008 | |
| "Mírame bien" | Julieta Venegas | Julieta Venegas | Limón y Sal | 2006 | |
| "Morenamía" | Miguel Bosé feat. Julieta Venegas | Lanfranco Ferrario; Massimo Grilli; Miguel Bosé | Papito | 2007 | |
| "Música somos" | Conector feat. Andrea Echeverri & Julieta Venegas | Héctor Buitrago | Conector | 2006 | |
| "Nada fué un error" | Coti feat. Julieta Venegas & Paulina Rubio | | Esta Mañana Y Otros Cuentos | 2005 | |
| "Nada importante" | Julieta Venegas | Julieta Venegas | Los Momentos | 2013 | |
| "Nada serio" | Julieta Venegas | Julieta Venegas | Sí | 2003 | |
| "Niños" | Pedro Guerra feat. Julieta Venegas | | Ofrenda | 2001 | |
| "No creí" | Julieta Venegas | Julieta Venegas | Los Momentos | 2013 | |
| "No hace falta" | Julieta Venegas | Julieta Venegas; Coti Sorokin | Limón y Sal | 2006 | |
| "No me importa el dinero" | Los Auténticos Decadentes & Julieta Venegas | | Hecho En Mexico - En Vivo En El Palacio De Los Deportes - 25 Aniversario | 2012 | |
| "No me gusta el sol" | Los Tres & Julieta Venegas (chorus) | Álvaro Henríque; Ángel Parra; Roberto Lindl | La Sangre En El Cuerpo | 1999 | |
| "No seré" | Julieta Venegas | Julieta Venegas; Coti Sorokin | Limón y Sal | 2006 | |
| "No somos de aquí" | Julieta Venegas | Joselo Rangel | Quemar Las Naves | 2007 | |
| "Oleada" | Julieta Venegas | Coti Sorokin; Julieta Venegas | Sí | 2003 | |
| "Oportunidad" | Julieta Venegas | Julieta Venegas | Aquí | 1997 | |
| "Orejas" | Julieta Venegas | Julieta Venegas | La Increíble Historia del Niño de Piedra (Banda Sonora) | 2015 | |
| "Original" | Julieta Venegas | Julieta Venegas | Otra Cosa | 2010 | |
| "Otra cosa" | Julieta Venegas | Julieta Venegas | Otra Cosa | 2010 | |
| "Otro sol" | Julieta Venegas | Julieta Venegas | Bueninvento | 2000 | |
| "Pa 'bailar - siempre quiero más" | Bajofondo feat. Julieta Venegas | | Mar Dulce | 2008 | |
| "Parte mía" | Julieta Venegas | Julieta Venegas | Algo Sucede | 2015 | |
| "Perfecta" | Miranda! feat. Julieta Venegas | Alejandro Sergi | El Disco De Tu Corazón | 2007 | |
| "Porvenir" | Julieta Venegas | Julieta Venegas | Algo Sucede | 2015 | |
| "Primer día" | Julieta Venegas feat. Dante Spinetta | Julieta Venegas; Dante Spinetta | Limón y Sal | 2006 | |
| "Puntos suspensivos" | Pedro Guerra & Joaquín Sabina feat. Julieta Venegas & Pablo Milanés | Joaquín Sabina | 14 De Ciento Volando De 14 | 2016 | |
| "Quitar a otras" | Julieta Venegas | Julieta Venegas | Aquí | 1997 | |
| "Recuerdo perdido" | Julieta Venegas | Julieta Venegas | Aquí | 1997 | |
| "Relampiano" | Lenine & Julieta Venegas | | Contaminados | 2005 | |
| "Revolución" | Julieta Venegas | Julieta Venegas | Otra Cosa | 2010 | |
| "Sabiéndose de los descalzos" | Julieta Venegas | Julieta Venegas | Aquí | 1997 | |
| "Sabores" | Julieta Venegas | Julieta Venegas | La Increíble Historia del Niño de Piedra (Banda Sonora) | 2015 | |
| "Salvavidas" | Julieta Venegas | Julieta Venegas | Bueninvento | 2000 | |
| "Saudade" | Otto feat. Julieta Venegas | | Certa Manhã Acordei De Sonhos Intranquilos | 2009 | |
| "Se explicará" | Julieta Venegas | Julieta Venegas | Algo Sucede | 2015 | |
| "Serenata sin luna" | Julieta Venegas | José Alfredo Jiménez | José Alfredo Jiménez ... XXX El Mundo Raro Del Que Sigue Siendo El Rey | 2003 | |
| "Sería feliz" | Julieta Venegas | Julieta Venegas | Bueninvento | 2000 | |
| "Si tú no estás" | Julieta Venegas | Julieta Venegas | Otra Cosa | 2010 | |
| "Sin documentos" | Julieta Venegas | Andrés Calamaro | Calamaro Querido! (Cantando Al Salmón) | 2006 | |
| "Siempre en mi mente" | Julieta Venegas | Juan Gabriel | Bueninvento | 2000 | |
| "Soy virgen y soy leal" | Julieta Venegas & Yamil Rezc | Julieta Venegas & Yamil Rezc | La Vida Inmoral de la Pareja Ideal (Banda Sonora) | 2016 | |
| "Suavecito" | Julieta Venegas | | Elvira, Te Daría Mi Vida Pero la Estoy Usando (Banda Sonora) | 2015 | |
| "Sueño de sombras" | Julieta Venegas | Julieta Venegas | Bueninvento | 2000 | |
| "Sueños" | Diego Torres feat. Julieta Venegas | Cachorro López; Sebastián Schon/Diego Torres | MTV Unplugged | 2004 | |
| "Te vi" | Julieta Venegas | Julieta Venegas | Los Momentos | 2013 | |
| "Te voy a mostrar" | Julieta Venegas | Julieta Venegas | Limón y Sal | 2006 | |
| "The Prince of Silence" | Various | | The Price of Silence - EP | 2008 | |
| "Tiempo pa pensá" | Mala Rodríguez feat. Julieta Venegas | Julieta Venegas | Malamarismo | 2007 | |
| "Todo es mentira" | Fangoria feat. Julieta Venegas | | El Extraño Viaje Revisitado | 2007 | |
| "Todo está aquí" | Julieta Venegas | Julieta Venegas | Algo Sucede | 2015 | |
| "Todos inventamos" | Julieta Venegas | Julieta Venegas | Bueninvento | 2000 | |
| "Tu calor" | Julieta Venegas | Julieta Venegas; Cachorro López | Algo Sucede | 2015 | |
| "Tu nombre" | Coti feat. Julieta Venegas | | Esta Mañana Y Otros Cuentos | 2005 | |
| "Tuve para dar" | Julieta Venegas | Julieta Venegas | Los Momentos | 2013 | |
| "Última vez" | Julieta Venegas | Julieta Venegas; Cachorro López | Limón y Sal | 2006 | |
| "Un lugar" | Julieta Venegas | Julieta Venegas | Otra Cosa | 2010 | |
| "Un poco de paz" | Julieta Venegas | Julieta Venegas | Los Momentos | 2013 | |
| "Una respuesta" | Julieta Venegas | Julieta Venegas | Algo Sucede | 2015 | |
| "Verdad" | Julieta Venegas | Julieta Venegas | Aquí | 1997 | |
| "Verte otra vez" | Julieta Venegas | Julieta Venegas | Los Momentos | 2013 | |
| "Voluntad" | Julieta Venegas | Julieta Venegas | Bueninvento | 2000 | |
| "Volver a empezar" | Julieta Venegas | Julieta Venegas | Los Momentos | 2013 | |
| "Vuelve" | Julieta Venegas feat. Rubén Albarrán & Anita Tijoux | Julieta Venegas; Rubén Albarrán; Anamaría Tijoux | Los Momentos | 2013 | |
| "Ya conocerán" | Julieta Venegas | Julieta Venegas | Otra Cosa | 2010 | |
| "Ya vienen los Reyes" | Julieta Venegas | | Queridos Reyes Magos | 2005 | |
| "Zombilaridad" | Various | | El Santos Vs La Tetona Mendoza (Banda Sonora) | 2012 | |

== Tributes ==
Neruda en el Corazón
Track: A Callarse

XXX: Tributo a José Alfredo Jiménez
Track: Serenta Sin Luna

Los Shajato: Tributo a John Lenon
Track: Blackbird and You've Got To Hide Your Love Away

Entre Todas las Mujeres: Voces de Mujer Cantan a Joaquín Sabina
Track: Corre, Dijo La Tortuga

Volcán: Un Tributo a José José
Track: El Triste

Soda Stereo: Tributo
Track: Disco Eterno

El Más Grande Homenaje A Los Tigres del Norte
Track: La Jaula de Oro

Calamaro Querido: Cantando al Salmón (Parte 2)
Track: Sin Documentos (track also included in the album "Limón y Sal")

Papito
Track: Morena Mia" (Feat. Miguel Bosé)

Cantora 1
Track: Sabiéndose de Los Descalzos (Feat. Mercedes Sosa)

Homenaje A Chavela Vargas
Track: Las Ciudades

=== As featured artist ===
| Year | Single | Album |
|---|---|---|
| 1999 | "Infinito" (Enrique Bunbury feat. Julieta Venegas) | Infinito |
| 2002 | "El Listón de Tu Pelo" (Pau Donés feat. Julieta Venegas) | Asesino en Serio (Soundtrack) |
| 2004 | "El Dolor Del Micro" (Cartel de Santa feat. Julieta Venegas) | Cartel de Santa Vol. II |
| 2004 | "El Tonto" (Vicentico feat. Julieta Venegas) | Los Rayos |
| 2005 | "Sueños" (Diego Torres feat. Julieta Venegas) | MTV Unplugged |
| 2007 | "Perfecta" (Miranda! feat. Julieta Venegas) | El Disco De Tu Corazón |
| 2007 | "Tiempo Pa' Pensá" (La Mala Rodríguez feat. Julieta Venegas) | Malamarismo |
| 2007 | "Gol" (Anita Tijoux feat. Julieta Venegas) | Kaos |
| 2009 | "Bajo Otra Luz" (Nelly Furtado feat. La Mala Rodríguez and Julieta Venegas) | Mi Plan |
| 2009 | "Saudade" and "Lagrimas Negras" (Otto feat. Julieta Venegas) | Certa Amanha Acordei de Sonhos Intranquilos |
| 2009 | "Hu Hu Hu" (Natalia Lafourcade feat. Julieta Venegas) | Hu Hu Hu |
