= Julieta Venegas discography =

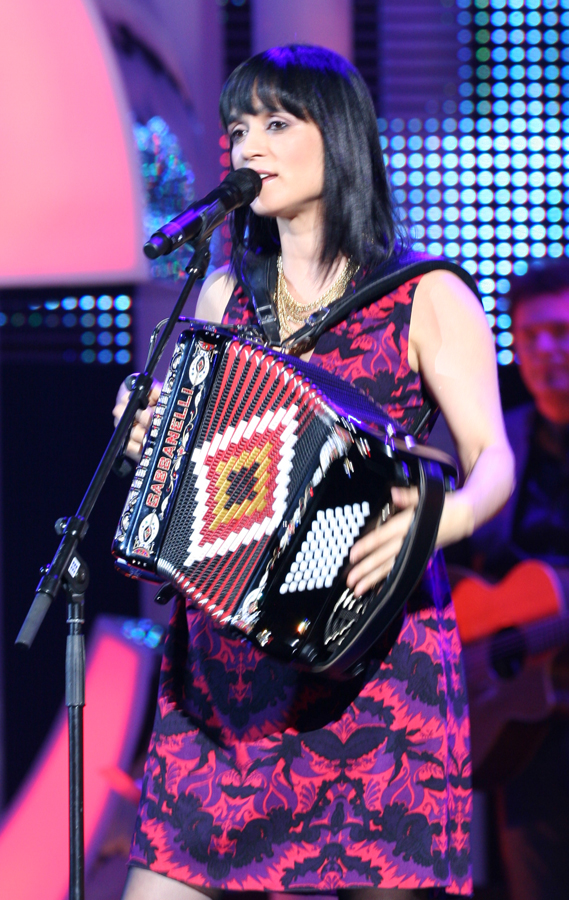
- Julieta Venegas performing at the Nobel Peace Prize concert in 2008
- Studio albums: 8
- Soundtrack albums: 16
- Live albums: 1
- Compilation albums: 2
- Singles: 20
- Video albums: 1
- Music videos: 23

The discography of Mexican singer Julieta Venegas consists of eight studio albums, one live album, one compilation album, and 16 singles. Venegas' breakthrough came in 2003 with the song "Andar Conmigo", from the album Sí, which reached number-one in the Mexican Singles Chart. The following year, she reached #4 in the Billboard Hot Latin Songs chart with "Algo Está Cambiando". In 2006, she released the critically acclaimed Grammy Award-winning Limón y Sal for Best Latin Pop Album, which spanned the hits "Me Voy" and "Eres Para Mí". In 2008, her first live album, MTV Unplugged, peaked at #162 on the Billboard 200 chart. In 2010, she released her fifth studio release entitled "Otra Cosa" a week achieved a gold record for high sales and as a first single launches "Bien o Mal."

== Albums ==
=== Studio albums ===
List of albums, with selected chart positions, sales, and certifications
Title	Album details	Peak chart positions									Certifications	Sales
Title	Album details	MEX	ARG	GRE	ITA	SPA	SWI	US	US Latin	US Latin Pop	Certifications	Sales
Aquí	Released: 24 March 1997; Label: Ariola, BMG; Formats: Cassette, CD, LP	—	—	—	—	—	—	—	—	—		WW: 300,000
Bueninvento	Released: August 21, 2000; Label: Ariola, BMG; Formats: Cassette, CD, LP	7	—	—	—	—	—	—	—	—		WW: 500,000
Sí	Released: 11 November 2003; Label: Ariola, BMG; Formats: CD, Digital download, LP	1	—	—	—	96	—	—	23	4	AMPROFON 2× Platinum+Gold; CAPIF Gold; RIAA: 2× Platinum (Latin)	ARG: 20,000; CHI: 10,000; MEX: 375,000; US: 200,000; WW: 7,500,000
Limón y Sal	Released: 30 May 2006; Label: Ariola, Sony BMG; Formats: CD, digital download, LP	1	1	—	14	4	9	177	8	2	AMPROFON: Platinum; ASINCOL: Gold; APFV: Gold; CAPIF: Platinum; IFPI CHI: Gold; FIMI: Gold; PROMUSICAE: Platinum; RIAA: Platinum (Latin)	ARG: 40,000; COL: 9,000; MEX: 100,000; SPA: 80,000; US: 100,000
Otra Cosa	Released: 16 March 2010; Label: Sony Latin; Formats: CD, digital download, LP, iTunes LP	12	3	29	—	19	19	—	5	3	AMPROFON: Gold	MEX: 30,000; WW: 600,000
Los Momentos	Released: 19 March 2013; Label: Sony Latin; Formats: CD, digital download, LP	22	2	—	—	35	—	—	12	5	—	—
Algo Sucede	Released: 14 August 2015; Label: Ohanian, Sony Latin; Formats: CD, digital download, LP	11	—	—	—	29	—	—	5	1	AMPROFON: Gold	MEX: 30,000
Tu Historia	Released: 11 November 2022; Label: Altafonte, Lolein Music; Formats: Digital download, LP	—	—	—	—	—	—	—	—	—		

=== Compilations ===
List of albums, with selected chart positions, sales, and certifications
Title	Album details	Peak chart positions				
Title	Album details	MEX	SPA	US	US Latin	US Latin Pop
Realmente Lo Mejor	Released: 18 December 2007; Label: Sony BMG; Formats: CD, digital download	61	32	—	36	12

=== Live albums ===
List of albums, with selected chart positions, sales, and certifications
Title	Album details	Peak chart positions						Certifications	Sales
Title	Album details	MEX	SPA	SWI	US	US Latin	US Latin Pop	Certifications	Sales
MTV Unplugged	Released: 13 June 2008; Label: Sony BMG; Formats: CD, digital download	1	18	39	169	9	4	MEX: Diamond+2× Platinum; ARG: Gold; COL: Gold	MEX: 600,000; ARG: 40,000

== Singles ==
=== 1990s ===
Title	Year	Album
"De mis pasos"	1997	Aquí
"Cómo sé"	1997	Aquí

=== 2000s ===
Title	Year	Peak chart positions								Certifications	Album
Title	Year	MEX	COL	ITA	SPA	SWI	US Latin	US Latin Pop	VEN	Certifications	Album
"Sería Feliz"	2000	—	—	—	—	—	—	—	—		Bueninvento
"Hoy No Quiero"	2000	—	—	—	—	—	—	—	—		Bueninvento
"Andar Conmigo"	2003	1	5	—	—	—	33	17	—		Sí
"Lento"	2004	1	—	—	—	—	31	13	9		Sí
"Algo Está Cambiando"	2004	1	—	—	—	—	4	1	—		Sí
"Oleada"	2005	9	—	—	—	—	—	31	—		Sí
"Me Voy"	2006	1	1	1	1	12	9	1	5	AMPROFON: Gold	Limón y Sal
"Limón y Sal"	2006	—	—	—	2	—	—	24	—		Limón y Sal
"Eres Para Mí" (feat. Anita Tijoux)	2007	1	1	—	—	2	5	2	9	AMPROFON: Gold	Limón y Sal
"Primer Día" (feat. Dante Spinetta)	2007	37	—	—	13	—	—	—	6		Limón y Sal
"El Presente"	2008	1	—	—	3	—	11	2	1		MTV Unplugged
"Algún Día"	2008	1	—	—	—	—	—	—	—		MTV Unplugged
"—" denotes a title that did not chart, or was not released in that territory.

=== 2010s ===
Title	Year	Peak chart positions					Certifications	Album
Title	Year	MEX	SPA	US Latin	US Latin Pop	VEN	Certifications	Album
"Bien o Mal"	2010	9	45	21	8	—		Otra Cosa
"Despedida"	2010	—	—	—	35	—		Otra Cosa
"Ya Conocerán"	2011	—	—	—	—	—		Otra Cosa
"Tuve Para Dar"	2012	41	—	—	—	—		Los Momentos
"Te Vi"	2013	10	—	—	—	—	AMPROFON: Gold	Los Momentos
"Ese Camino"	2015	3	—	—	13	6		Algo Sucede
"Buenas Noches, Desolación"	2015	8	—	—	25	5		Algo Sucede
"Tu Calor"	2016	31	—	—	—	—		Algo Sucede
"Todo Está Aquí"	2016	—	—	—	—	—		Algo Sucede
"Acariname" (with Los Ángeles Azules and Juan Ingaramo)	2019	12	—	29	—	—	AMPROFON: Platinum+Gold	Non-album single
"—" denotes a title that did not chart, or was not released in that territory.

=== 2020s ===
Title	Year	Peak chart positions								Certifications	Album
Title	Year	MEX	ARG	COL	SPA	SWI	US	US Latin	US Latin Pop	Certifications	Album
"Lo Siento BB:/" (with Tainy and Bad Bunny)	2021	1	39	5	5	74	51	2	9	RIAA: 31× Platinum (Latin); PROMUSICAE: Platinum	Non-album single
"Mismo Amor"	2022	—	—	—	—	—	—	—	—		Tu Historia
"Caminar Sola"	2022	—	—	—	—	—	—	—	—		Tu Historia
"En Tu Orilla"	2022	—	—	—	—	—	—	—	—		Tu Historia
"Te Encontré"	2022	—	—	—	—	—	—	—	—		Tu Historia
"Tu Historia"	2022	—	—	—	—	—	—	—	—		Tu Historia
"Dame Otra Oportunidad"	2023	—	—	—	—	—	—	—	—		Tu Historia
"—" denotes a title that did not chart, or was not released in that territory.

=== As featured artist ===
List of singles, with selected chart positions
Title	Year	Peak chart positions			Album
Title	Year	MEX	US Latin	US Latin Pop	Album
"Sueños" (Diego Torres featuring Julieta Venegas)	2005	—	—	—	MTV Unplugged
"Nada Fue Un Error" (Coti featuring Paulina Rubio & Julieta Venegas)	2005	—	40	15	Esta Mañana y Otros Cuentos
"Morena Mía" (Miguel Bosé featuring Julieta Venegas)	2007	12	48	18	Papito
"Perfecta" (Miranda! featuring Julieta Venegas)	2007	3	—	—	El Disco de Tu Corazón
"Bajo Otra Luz" (Nelly Furtado featuring La Mala Rodríguez & Julieta Venegas)	2009	—	—	—	Mi Plan
"—" denotes a title that did not chart, or was not released in that territory.

=== Promotional singles ===
List of singles, with selected chart positions, showing year released and album name
Title	Year	Album
"Amores Perros (Me Van A Matar)"	1999	Amores Perros (Soundtrack)
"Mi Principio"	2008	Cosas Raras
"Abel"	2010	Abel (Soundtrack)
"Explosión"	2015	Algo Sucede
"Algo Sucede"	2015	Algo Sucede
"Una Respuesta"	2015	Algo Sucede
"Todo Está Aquí"	2016	Algo Sucede

== Videography ==
=== Video albums ===
List of video albums with relevant details
Title	Album details
MTV Unplugged	Released: 20 June 2008; Label: Sony International; Format: DVD, Blu-ray

=== Music videos ===
List of music videos, showing year released and directors
Title	Year	Director(s)
"De mis pasos"	1997	Carlos Somote
"Hoy No Quiero"	1997	Francisco Franco
"Sería Feliz"	2000	Fernando Eimebke
"Hoy No Quiero"	2000	Nunca Pepe
"Andar Conmigo"	2003	Santiago Pueyrredon
"Lento"	2004	Rogelio Sikander
"Algo Está Cambiando"	2004	Rigoberto Castañeda
"Oleada"	2005	Valdés & Chicle
"Me Voy"	2006	Picky Tallarico
"Limón y Sal"	2006	Picky Tallarico
"Eres Para Mí"	2007	Sebastián Sánchez
"Primer Día"	2007	Joaquín Cambre
"El Presente"	2008	
"Algún Día"	2008	
"Bien o Mal"	2010	Agustín Alberdi
"Despedida"	2010	Agustín Alberdi
"Despedida (2° Corte)"	2010	Agustín Alberdi
"Ya Conocerán"	2011	Gregory Allen, Yvonne Venegas
"Tuve Para Dar"	2012	Gregory Allen, Yvonne Venegas
"Te Vi"	2013	Hernán Marcelo Corera, Luciano Benjamín Cieza, Oscar Héctor Fernández, Sebastián Sutton
"Aquí Sigo"	2014	Emilio Aragón, Julieta Venegas
"Ese Camino"	2015	Julieta Venegas, Cachorro López, Claudio Divella
"Suavecito"	2015	
"Buenas Noches, Desolación"	2015	Francisco Franco

== Soundtracks ==
- Todo El Poder (1999)

Tracks: Chikero Bombay (Liquits featuring Julieta Venegas)

- Amores Perros (2000)

Track: Amores Perros (Me Van A Matar)

- Sin Vergüenza (2001)

Track: Fé

- En el País de No Pasa Nada (2001)

Tracks: Ay, Mala Leche and Lo Que Pedí

- Perfume de Violetas (2001)

Tracks: La Espera (Sr. González featuring Julieta Venegas)

- Demasiado Amor (2001)

Tracks: Acaríciame (Versión Mastretta) and Acaríciame (Versión Joan Valent)

- El Sueño del Caimán (2002)

Tracks: El Sueño del Caimán (Mastretta featuring Julieta Venegas)

- Asesino En Serio (2002)

Track: El Listón de Tu Pelo (Pau Donés featuring Julieta Venegas)

- Subterra (2003)

Track: Lo Que Tú Me Das (Julieta Venegas featuring Anita Tijoux)

- Maria Full of Grace (2004)

Track: Lo Que Venga Después

- Sólo Dios Sabe (2005)

Track: Saudade (Julieta Venegas featuring Otto) and Lágrimas Negras

- The Heartbreak Kid (2007)

Track: Canciones De Amor

- Quemar Las Naves (2008)

Tracks: Mi Principio, Miel Con Veneno and No Somos de Aquí

- Abel (2010)

Track: Abel

- Una Noche En el Viejo México (2014)

Track: Aquí Sigo

- Elvira, te daría mi vida pero la estoy usando (2015)

Track: Suavecito
