= Realmente lo Mejor =

Compilation album by Julieta Venegas
- Released: December 18, 2007
- Genre: Rock en Español
- Length: 43:49
- Language: Spanish
- Label: Sony BMG
- Producer: Gustavo Santaolalla, Coti Sorokin, Cachorro López

Julieta Venegas chronology
Limón y Sal (2006)	Realmente lo Mejor (2007)	MTV Unplugged (2008)

Professional ratings
Review scores
Source	Rating
Allmusic	4.5/5 stars

Realmente lo Mejor ("Really the best") is the first compilation album released by Mexican singer-songwriter Julieta Venegas on December 18, 2007. This album includes every single released from her first four albums, Aquí, Bueninvento, Sí, and Limón y Sal. It was also announced that a special deluxe edition was to be released with this album (tentatively named Cosas Raras), including B-sides and soundtrack collaborations, but to date remains unreleased.

== Album history ==
Realmente lo Mejor lines up the 12 singles from Venegas repertoire. "De Mis Pasos" and "Como Sé" taken from her Gustavo Santaolalla-produced debut album Aquí; "Sería Feliz" and "Hoy No Quiero" from Bueninvento; "Andar Conmigo", "Lento", "Algo Está Cambiando" and "Oleada" from her Grammy winning recording Sí; and four singles from Limón y Sal, "Me Voy", the title track, "Eres Para Mí" and "Primer Día". This collection received a very positive review by Jason Birchmeier of Allmusic, recalling that the singles flow together smoothly, and that the "stylistic evolution of Venegas over the years sounds perfectly natural, an artistic progression rather than a calculated crossover bid." Since this album release was announced that a special edition, consisting on a compilation album titled Cosas Raras, including rarities, demos, and tracks recorded for films, but that never have appeared on any Venegas album was to be released. This tracks were covers from Los Tigres del Norte and Soda Stereo, a tribute to Pablo Neruda, also songs included on the films Maria Full of Grace, Quemar las Naves, Hotel Tivoli, Sólo Dios Sabe and Subterra; plus two demos never released before. The album had an official release date in Mexico on January 26, 2008, but to date it remains unreleased.

== Track listing ==
1. "De mis pasos" - 3:20
2. "Cómo sé" - 3:27
3. "Sería Feliz" - 3:15
4. "Hoy No Quiero" - 3:19
5. "Andar Conmigo" - 3:15
6. "Lento" - 4:06
7. "Algo Está Cambiando" - 4:04
8. "Oleada" - 3:10
9. "Me Voy" - 3:28
10. "Limón y Sal" - 3:15
11. "Eres Para Mí" Feat. Anita Tijoux - 3:58
12. "Primer Día" Feat. Dante Spinetta - 3:56

== Chart performance ==
This album charted within the Top 100 album sales chart of Mexico and Spain. It also peaked at number 36 on the Billboard Top Latin Albums chart. Realmente lo Mejor was unable to match the success of the performer's previous albums.

=== Weekly charts ===
Chart (2007–08)	Peak position
Mexican Albums (Top 100 México)	61
Spanish Albums (PROMUSICAE)	80
US Top Latin Albums (Billboard)	36
US Latin Pop Albums (Billboard)	12
