= Mi principio =

"Mi Principio"

Single by Julieta Venegas

from the album Cosas Raras
- Language: Spanish
- Released: 2008
- Recorded: 2007–2008
- Genre: Pop rock
- Length: 3:33
- Label: Ariola; Sony BMG
- Songwriters: Joselo Rangel; Julieta Venegas
- Producer: Emannuel Del Real

Julieta Venegas singles chronology
| "Perfecta" (2007) | "Mi Principio" (2008) | "El presente" (2008) |

"Mi principio" (English: My Beginning) is the first single from the album Cosas Raras by Julieta Venegas. It also appears on the soundtrack of the movie "Quemar las Naves"

== Song information ==
The soundtrack was on account of Julieta Venegas and the letter of Joselo as in the song of "Miel con veneno". Joselo in his own words said that the song is about a relationship in which one of them has to go to find their truth in a nutshell its inception. The song is also played by Eugenia Leon, in the film "Quemar las nubes," the actress Claudette Maillé is a singer, where the song is her biggest hit, Claudette never sings, but when you put the disk in fact the voice you hear is Eugenia Leon.

== Music video ==
In the video can be seen playing Julieta Venegas song in a location that is part of the film with a background that resembles the sea and drawings of fish hanging at the ceiling while scenes from the film samples and was directed by his friend Francisco Franco, which directed the video for "Cómo sé" the second single from the album Aquí.

== Awards ==
- Ariel Award Mexico

| Year | Title | Result |
|---|---|---|
2008
| 2008 | Best Soundtrack | Won |
