= Te Vi =

Te Vi may refer to:

- "Te Vi" (Julieta Venegas song), 2013
- "Te Vi" (Piso 21 song), 2018
