= Espectacular =

Studio album by Juan Gabriel
- Released: June 26, 1978
- Recorded: 1978
- Genre: Latin pop
- Length: 32:45
- Label: RCA Records
- Producer: Eduardo Magallanes

Juan Gabriel chronology
Siempre En Mi Mente (1978)	Espectacular (1978)	Mis Ojos Tristes (1978)

Espectacular (English: Spectacular) is the tenth studio album by Mexican singer-songwriter Juan Gabriel, originally released in 1978 and re-released on July 30, 1996. This was the first Juan Gabriel album with the Ariola label. It was recorded in Europe with The London Symphony Orchestra and The Ray Conniff Orchestra.

== Track listing ==
No.	Title	Length
1.	"¿Donde Estas Vida Mia?"	3:14
2.	"Es Mejor Decir Adios"	2:27
3.	"Yo Se Que Esta En Tu Corazon"	3:02
4.	"Mi Fracaso"	2:41
5.	"No Me Importara Tu Olvido"	4:13
6.	"Aunque Te Enamores"	3:37
7.	"Dame Dame"	3:07
8.	"Cancion Para No Olvidar"	3:01
9.	"Cuando Escuches Mi Cancion"	3:00
10.	"Adios Amor, Te Vas"	4:16
