= Te Llegará Mi Olvido =

Studio album by Juan Gabriel
- Released: January 26, 1978
- Recorded: 1977
- Genres: Ranchera, mariachi
- Length: 26:43
- Label: RCA
- Producer: Juan Gabriel

Juan Gabriel chronology
Juan Gabriel con, Mariachi Vol. II (1976)	Te Llegará Mi Olvido (1978)	Siempre En Mi Mente (1978)

Te Llegará Mi Olvido (I Will Forget You) is the eighth studio album by Mexican singer-songwriter Juan Gabriel, originally released in 1978 and re-released in April 1992. Mariachi América de Jesús Rodríguez de Hijar was involved with this production.

== Track listing ==
No.	Title	Length
1.	"Te Llegará Mi Olvido"	2:16
2.	"Vidita Mia"	2:55
3.	"Con un Poco de Amor"	2:36
4.	"Te Quise Olvidar"	3:03
5.	"Maria, Maria"	3:01
6.	"Primera Vez"	2:14
7.	"Eres un Amor"	2:27
8.	"Me Desperto la Realidad"	2:22
9.	"Frente a Frente"	3:28
10.	"Me Gusta Estar Contigo"	2:17
