= Mis Ojos Tristes =

1978 studio album by Juan Gabriel

Studio album by Juan Gabriel
- Released: October 15, 1978
- Recorded: 1978
- Genre: Ranchera, Mariachi
- Length: 33:34
- Label: RCA Records

Juan Gabriel chronology
Espectacular (1978)	Mis Ojos Tristes (1978)	Me Gusta Bailar Contigo (1979)

Mis Ojos Tristes (English: My Sad Eyes) is the eleventh studio album by Mexican singer and songwriter Juan Gabriel, released in 1978 and re-released in May 1996. Mariachi América de Jesus Rodríguez de Hijar was involved in the production.

== Track listing ==
No.	Title	Length
1.	"Con Todo Y Mi Tristeza"	3:50
2.	"Dios Te Bendiga Mi Amor"	3:40
3.	"Arriba Juárez!"	3:18
4.	"Guarecita"	2:55
5.	"María De Todas Las Marías"	3:31
6.	"Mis Ojos Tristes"	3:50
7.	"Cuando Quieras... Déjame"	2:59
8.	"Silencio Por Qué Silencio?"	3:41
9.	"Hermosillo"	2:41
10.	"Ya Para Qué?"	3:04
