= Juan Gabriel con Mariachi Vol. II =

Studio album by Juan Gabriel
- Released: 1976
- Genre: Mariachi
- Length: 28:59
- Label: RCA Records

Juan Gabriel chronology
| A Mi Guitarra (1976) | Juan Gabriel con Mariachi Vol. II (1976) | Te Llegará Mi Olvido (1978) |

Juan Gabriel con Mariachi Vol. II ("Juan Gabriel with Mariachi Vol. 2") is the seventh studio album by Mexican singer-songwriter Juan Gabriel, originally released in 1976 and re-released on July 30, 1996. In this album, Juan Gabriel performs with Mariachi Mexico 70 de Pepe Lopez.

== Track listing ==
| No. | Title | Length |
|---|---|---|
| 1. | "Te Voy A Olvidar" | 3:25 |
| 2. | "Otra Vez Me Enamore" | 2:50 |
| 3. | "Nos Vemos Mañana" | 2:51 |
| 4. | "Siempre Estoy Pensando En Ti" | 3:32 |
| 5. | "17 Años" | 2:57 |
| 6. | "Cuando Decidas Volver" | 2:03 |
| 7. | "Ya No Insistas Corazon" | 2:57 |
| 8. | "Cuando Todo Se Acabe" | 3:45 |
| 9. | "Ya No Vuelvo A Molestarte" | 2:16 |
| 10. | "Nuestros Corazones" | 2:20 |
