= Tributo a Soda Stereo =

Studio album by Various Artists
- Released: October 23, 2001
- Genre: Rock en español

Tributo a Soda Stereo is a 2001 album tribute to the Argentinian rock band Soda Stereo.

== Track listing ==
1. "Vitaminas" - Genitallica
2. "Un Millon De Años Luz" - Jumbo
3. "Zoom" - Mœnia
4. "Septimo Dia" - Gandhi
5. "La Cupula" - Los Caballeros De La Quema
6. "Juegos De Seduccion" - Lucybell
7. "Te Para Tres" - Aterciopelados
8. "Primavera Cero" - La Gusana Ciega
9. "Disco Eterno" - Julieta Venegas
10. "Camaleon" - Control Machete
11. "Persiana Americana" - Atomica
