= Hoy No Quiero =

2000 song performed by Julieta Venegas

Single by Julieta Venegas

from the album Bueninvento
- Language: Spanish
- Released: (Mexico) 2000
- Recorded: Mad Hatter Studios, Bomb Factory, Cam A Recorders & La Casa, Los Angeles, California & El Ensayo State of Mexico, Mexico
- Genre: Alternative rock, rock
- Length: 3:15
- Label: Ariola; BMG
- Songwriter: Julieta Venegas
- Producers: Emmanuel Del Real, Quique Rangel, Joe Chiccarelli

Julieta Venegas singles chronology
"Siempre en Mi Mente" (2000)	"Hoy No Quiero" (2000)	"Andar Conmigo" (2003)

"Hoy No Quiero" (English: "Today I Don't Want") is the third single from the singer rocker Mexican Julieta Venegas in her studio album Bueninvento. The song is nominated for Latin Grammy Award for Best Rock Song.

== Song information ==
Was written and composed by Julieta Venegas, produced by Joe Chiccarelli, Emmanuel Del Real, Enrique Rangel of the Café Tacvba.

== Music video ==
The video was recorded in Madrid, Spain. Venagas appears playing guitar and walking the streets of that city.

== Track listing ==
CD single

1. "Hoy No Quiero" — 3:15
