= De mis pasos =

"De Mis Pasos"

Single by Julieta Venegas

from the album Aquí
- Language: Spanish
- Released: (Mexico) 1997
- Recorded: Mad Hatter Studios, Bomb Factory, Cam A Recorders & La Casa, Los Angeles, California & El Ensayo State of Mexico, Mexico
- Genre: Alternative rock, rock
- Length: 3:17
- Label: Ariola; BMG
- Songwriter: Julieta Venegas
- Producers: Emmanuel Del Real, Quique Rangel, Joe Chiccarelli

Julieta Venegas singles chronology
"De Mis Pasos" (1997)	"Cómo sé" (1997)

"De Mis Pasos" (Of My Steps) is the first single on the debut album Aquí (Here) by Julieta Venegas.

== Song ==
"De Mis Pasos" was written by Julieta Venegas and deals with a woman who sees that following her steps can lead to learning from her own errors. In 2008, a new version for her album was played on MTV Unplugged, including a duet with Juan Son. It was number 90 of the best songs of the 90's in Spanish on Vh1

== Video ==
In the video Julieta is seen acting rebelliously and playing her accordion and walking from side to side. The video features scenes in color as well as in black and white.

== List of songs ==
CD Promo

1. "De Mis Pasos"
2. "We Aren't Going to Leave" (Bon and the Enemies of Silence)

CD Promo

1. "De Mis Pasos"
2. Interview

== Versions ==
- De mis pasos (Original Version)
- De mis pasos (Version MTV Unplugged with Juan Are)
