= Algo Sucede =

Studio album by Julieta Venegas
- Released: August 14, 2015
- Genres: Folk rock; indie pop; pop rock
- Length: 40:08
- Language: Spanish
- Labels: Ohanian; Sony Latin
- Producers: Julieta Venegas; Cachorro López; Yamil Rezc

Julieta Venegas chronology
Los Momentos (2013)	Algo Sucede (2015)	Tu Historia (2022)

Singles from Algo Sucede
- 1. "Ese Camino" Released: May 5, 2015; 2. "Buenas Noches, Desolación" Released: August 14, 2015; 3. "Tu Calor" Released: March 11, 2016

Algo Sucede (English: Something Happens) is the seventh studio album by Mexican singer and songwriter Julieta Venegas, released on August 14, 2015, through Ohanian and Sony Latin. It was produced by Venegas alongside Cachorro López and Yamil Rezc.

At the 16th Annual Latin Grammy Awards, the song "Ese Camino" was nominated for both Song of the Year and Record of the Year while the following year, the album was nominated for Album of the Year and won Best Pop/Rock Album at the 17th Annual Latin Grammy Awards. The album was also nominated for Best Latin Pop Album at the 58th Annual Grammy Awards.

The album was certified gold in Mexico and peaked at numbers 5 and 1 at the Top Latin Albums and Latin Pop Albums charts, respectively, being her first number one in the latter chart.

== Background ==
The album was recorded after a tour through Latin America, Europe and United States that followed Venegas previous album Los Momentos, it was produced alongside frequent collaborator Cachorro López and Yamil Rezc, and features a song, "Buenas Noches, Desolación", written with Miranda!'s Ale Sergi, with whom Venegas used to be a member of the supergroup Meteoros alongside López and Didi Gutman.

The name of the album, translated to "something happens" comes from the idea that "life is continuous movement and therefore there is always the possibility that something will happen", according to Venegas "I approach it from a positive perspective, because something can always happen to you, life can always surprise you, it can always teach you a lesson, or something incredible can happen that you did not expect, it has to do with everything. I mention that possibility on the album, it's something I like and that's why I chose this title".

== Singles ==
The song "Ese Camino" was the album's first single, released on May 5, 2015, it was followed by "Buenas Noches, Desolación" as the second single, released on August 14, 2015, both songs entered the Latin Pop Songs chart, peaking at numbers 13 and 25, respectively. "Tu Calor" was released as the third single in 2016.

== Critical reception ==
Professional ratings
Review scores
Source	Rating
Club Fonograma	4/5 stars
Indie Rocks!	8/10 stars
Jenesaispop	7/10 stars
Mondo Sonoro	7/10 stars
Rolling Stone	3/5 stars

Andrew Casillas from Club Fonograma gave the album four out of five stars writing that the album "delivers an array of addictive melodies, subversive wordplay, and delicately intricate arrangements that's been the foundation of Julieta's career thus far", he continued by saying that while the album would not have the impact on the music industry like some of her previous albums had, it was "the culmination of an artist whose spent over a decade refining her style into a workhorse of pop pleasantry and infectious wordplay", he also highlighted the song "Porvenir" as "easily the most gorgeous" among the songs in the album.

Mireia Pería from Jenesaispop gave the album a seven out of ten, saying that while the album was not brilliant it was a great follow-up to Los Momentos, her previous album, she also highlighted the songs "Esperaba", "Algo Sucede", "Se Explicará" and "Explosión" as the best in the album. Álex Jerez from Mondo Sonoro also gave the album a seven out of ten writing that "with Algo Sucede we cannot speak of a leap in Julieta's career, but rather of that album in which an artist puts on the brakes and presents everything learned in these long years".

== Track listing ==
All tracks were produced by Julieta Venegas and Cachorro López, expect when noted.

Algo Sucede track listing
No.	Title	Writer(s)	Producer(s)	Length
1.	"Esperaba"	Julieta Venegas		3:15
2.	"Tu Calor"	Venegas; Cachorro López		3:20
3.	"Ese Camino"	Venegas		3:09
4.	"Algo Sucede"	Venegas		3:34
5.	"Una Respuesta"	Venegas		2:53
6.	"Buenas Noches, Desolación"	Venegas; López; Ale Sergi		3:25
7.	"Dos Soledades"	Venegas		3:10
8.	"Se Explicará"	Venegas		3:36
9.	"Porvenir"	Venegas		3:31
10.	"Parte Mía"	Venegas		3:08
11.	"Explosión"	Venegas	Julieta Venegas; Cachorro López; Yamil Rezc	3:09
12.	"Todo Está Aquí"	Venegas		3:51
Total length:				40:08

== Charts ==
Weekly chart performance for Algo Sucede
Chart (2015)	Peak position
Spanish Albums (Promusicae)	29
US Top Latin Albums (Billboard)	5
US Latin Pop Albums (Billboard)	1

== Certifications ==
Region	Certification	Certified units/sales
Mexico (AMPROFON)	Gold	30,000^{^}
^{^} Shipments figures based on certification alone.
