= Eres para mí =

Single by Julieta Venegas featuring Anita Tijoux

from the album Limón y Sal
- Language: Spanish
- Released: January 1, 2007
- Recorded: Mondomix (Buenos Aires, Argentina)
- Length: 3:13
- Label: Ariola; Sony BMG
- Songwriters: Julieta Venegas, Anamaria Merino Tijoux
- Producer: Cachorro Lopez

Julieta Venegas featuring Anita Tijoux singles chronology
"Limón y Sal" (2007)	"Eres para mí" (2007)	"Primer día" (2007)

"Eres Para Mí" (English: "You Are for Me") is a Latin pop-hip-hop song by the Mexican singer-songwriter Julieta Venegas and Chilean singer Anita Tijoux. It was recorded for Venegas's fourth album Limón y Sal. Released as the third single on January 1, 2007, it had the same success as her first single "Me Voy" in Latin America appearing at the top of the pop charts.

== Song information ==
The song is a duo featuring Chilean rapper, Anita Tijoux and has grown to become one of Venegas's most successful songs in the U.S. Hot Latin Charts, reaching a peak of number 5 in just a few weeks and number 2 in Latin Pop Airplay. It is in the key of B minor and 4/4 time.

== Music video ==
The music video for "Eres Para Mí", directed by Sebastián Sánchez, who had previously worked with Babasónicos. It was recorded in La Plata, Argentina in the Republic of the Children, which represents a miniature city for children. The video was released on January 29, 2007, by MTV Latin America.

The video begins with Julieta in a fancy purple dress driving a yellow car while listening to Limón y Sal. When she parks and goes out of the car, she enters a colorful village where she comes across with a series of workers, such as a saleswoman, a nun, a construction worker, a man dressed as an octopus handing out fliers, a policewoman chasing a thief and a snack vendor.

Anita Tijoux is then seen walking and rapping calmly while being followed by the previous crowd, just to be joined by Venegas when the chorus begins again. The whole group then moves to the middle of the street and engages in a calm choreography while the women sing the rest of the song.

== Track listing ==
Digital Download

1. "Eres Para Mí" featuring Anita Tijoux — 3:16

CD Single

1. "Eres Para Mí" featuring Anita Tijoux — 3:16

== Charts and certifications ==
=== Weekly charts ===
Chart performance for "Eres Para Mí"
Chart (2007)	Peak position
Argentina (Associated Press)	7
Chile (Associated Press)	3
Colombia (National-Report)	1
Mexico (Monitor Latino)	1
Paraguay (Associated Press)	10
Spain (PROMUSICAE)	2
US Hot Latin Songs (Billboard)	5
US Latin Pop Airplay (Billboard)	2
US Latin Rhythm Airplay (Billboard)	22
US Tropical Airplay (Billboard)	36
Venezuela (Record Report)	9
Venezuela Pop Rock (Record Report)	5

=== Year-end charts ===
Chart (2007)	Position
US Hot Latin Songs (Billboard)	35
US Latin Pop Airplay (Billboard)	16

=== Certifications ===
Region	Certification	Certified units/sales
Mexico (AMPROFON) Ringtone	Gold	10,000^{*}
^{*} Sales figures based on certification alone.

== Versions ==
"Eres Para Mí" has had several versions that have sought to experience different rhythms with the letter:

- Eres Para Mí (Original feat. Anita Tijoux)
- Eres Para Mí (Sonidero Nacional and Celso Piña Version)
- Eres Para Mí feat. Daddy Yankee and Kinky in Los Premios MTV Latinoamérica 2006
- Eres Para Mí (Mix Disco Antromix)
- Eres Para Mí (Pepsi-Navidad feat. Daddy Yankee)
- Eres Para Mí (MTV Unplugged (Julieta Venegas) feat. La Mala Rodríguez)
