= Limón y Sal =

Studio album by Julieta Venegas
- Released: May 30, 2006
- Recorded: 2005–2006
- Studio: Mondomix (Buenos Aires, Argentina)
- Genre: Latin pop
- Length: 46:49
- Language: Spanish
- Label: Ariola; Sony BMG
- Producer: Cachorro López

Julieta Venegas chronology
Sí (2003)	Limón y Sal (2006)	Realmente lo Mejor (2007)

Singles from Limón y Sal
- 1. "Me Voy" Released: 28 March 2006; 2. "Limón y Sal" Released: 30 May 2006; 3. "Eres Para Mí" Released: 1 January 2007; 4. "Primer Día" Released: 1 June 2007; 5. "De Que Me Sirve" Released: 2007 (only in Europe)

Professional ratings
Review scores
Source	Rating
About.com	4.5/5 stars
AllMusic	4/5 stars

Limón y Sal (English: Lemon and Salt) is the fourth studio album released by Mexican singer-songwriter Julieta Venegas. Recorded in Buenos Aires, Argentina, it was first released in Mexico on May 30, 2006 and in the United States on June 6, 2006. The album's overall themes deal with the general ups and downs of life and relationships. All the songs were composed by Venegas, with the exception of three songs, where she had the help of Coti Sorokin, Dante Spinetta and Cachorro López. Some notable songs are "Primer Día" with its reggae rhythm, sung in a duet with Dante Spinetta, "De Qué Me Sirve", where she plays the accordion in a tango and "bolero" fashion and "Eres Para Mí", a pop duet with Chilean singer Ana Tijoux.

The album sold 50,000 copies upon three days of its initial release in Mexico. It reached 100,000 sales in Mexico within a month of its release.

It was nominated for Album of the Year at the 7th Latin Grammy Awards, winning for Best Alternative Music Album.

The song "Canciones de Amor" was used in the 2007 film The Heartbreak Kid, while "Mírame Bien" was used as the opening theme for the 2011-2012 Brazilian telenovela A Vida da Gente (The Life We Lead).

== Singles ==
"Me Voy" was released as the lead single from the album. Widely considered Venegas's most successful song ever, it topped charts on the US Billboard Hot Latin Tracks, Mexico and Spain, while reaching the top ten on the US Billboard Latin Pop Airplay chart, number three in Italy, and number 12 in Switzerland. It was nominated for Record of the Year and Best Short Form Music Video at the 7th Latin Grammy Awards.

The second single "Limón y Sal" was released as the second single, reaching number 24 on the US Billboard Latin Pop Airplay charts, and number two in Spain and Mexico.

"Eres para mí", a duet with Chilean singer Anita Tijoux, was released as the third single achieving great success in 2007, topping the US Latin Pop Airplay and Mexican charts and peaking at number five on the US Hot Latin Tracks and Latin Tropical Airplay charts, number two in Spain and number nine in Venezuela.

The fourth single was "Primer Día", featuring the rapper Dante Spinetta, having success on the muin sic charts in Mexico and reaching number 13 in Spain.

The fifth single, "De Que Me Sirve", was released in Europe only.

== Track listing ==
No.	Title	Writer(s)	Producer(s)	Length
1.	"Canciones de amor (Love Songs)"	Venegas	Cachorro López, Venegas	2:53
2.	"Me voy (I'm Leaving)"	Venegas	López, Venegas	3:10
3.	"Primer día" (First Day)" (feat. Dante Spinetta)	Venegas, Spinetta	López, Venegas	3:57
4.	"Limón y sal (Lemon and Salt)"	Venegas, Jorge Villamizar	López, Venegas	3:28
5.	"Dulce compañía (Sweet Company)"	Venegas	López, Venegas	3:23
6.	"De qué me sirve (What Good Is It?)"	Venegas, Coti Sorokin	Sorokin, Venegas	2:37
7.	"Adonde sea (Wherever It Might Be)"	Venegas	López, Venegas	2:57
8.	"Mírame bien (Look Right at Me)"	Venegas*	López, Venegas	3:38
9.	"No seré (I Won't Be)"	Venegas, Sorokin	Sorokin, Venegas	2:59
10.	"Última vez (Last Time)"	Venegas, López	López, Venegas	4:00
11.	"Eres para mí" (You're Meant for Me)" (feat. Anita Tijoux)	Venegas, Tijoux	López, Venegas	3:13
12.	"No Hace Falta (You Don't Have To)"	Venegas, Sorokin, López^	López, Venegas	3:29
13.	"Te voy a mostrar (I Will Show You)"	Venegas	López, Venegas	3:19
14.	"Sin documentos (Undocumented)" (Bonus Track)	Andrés Calamaro	López, Venegas	3:49

iTunes Bonus Tracks
No.	Title	Writer(s)	Length
13.	"Mala memoria (Bad Memory)" (Live)	Venegas	3:28

Napster Bonus Track
No.	Title	Writer(s)	Length
13.	"¿Cómo sé? (How Do I Know?)" (Live)	Venegas	3:22

Rhapsody Bonus Track
No.	Title	Writer(s)	Length
13.	"Andar conmigo (Walk With Me)" (De La Rivera Mix)	Venegas, Sorokin	4:40

DVD DualDisc & CD+DVD
No.	Title	Length
13.	"Me voy (I'm Leaving)" (Music Video)	3:05
14.	"Limón y Sal" (MTV Making the Record)	20:00
15.	"Album in stereo sound 2.0 & surround sound 5.1"	46:49

^ Additional Production * Co-producer

== Personnel ==
- Julieta Venegas - vocals, background vocals, accordion, acoustic guitar, keyboards, programming
- Juanchi Baleiron - acoustic guitar, electric guitar, baritone guitar
- Cachorro López - Baritone guitar, electric guitar, bass guitar, keyboards
- Coti Sorokin - electric guitar, bass guitar, acoustic guitar, backing vocals
- Dany Ávila - drums
- Guillermo Vadalá - bass guitar, banjo
- Ernesto Snajer - acoustic guitar, ten-string guitar
- Facundo Guevara - percussion
- Dante Spinetta - Vocals, composer
- Juan Blas Caballero - Programming, keyboards, electric guitar
- Juan Cruz de Urquiza - flugelhorn, trombone
- Matias Sorokin - slide guitar
- Anita Tijoux - background vocals
- Sebastián Schon - keyboards, programming
- Slava Poloudine - cello
- Pepito Mezclero - Scream

== Chart ==
=== Weekly charts ===
Chart (2006–2007)	Peak position
Argentine Albums (CAPIF)	1
European Top 100 Albums	71
Italian Albums (FIMI)	14
Mexican Albums (Top 100 México)	1
Spanish Albums (PROMUSICAE)	4
Swiss Albums (Schweizer Hitparade)	9
US Billboard 200	177
US Top Latin Albums (Billboard)	8
US Latin Pop Albums (Billboard)	2
US Top Heatseekers (Billboard)	9
Venezuelan Albums	5

=== Certifications ===
Region	Certification	Certified units/sales
Argentina (CAPIF)	Platinum	40,000^{^}
Chile	Gold	
Colombia	Gold	
Mexico (AMPROFON)	Platinum	100,000^{^}
Spain (Promusicae)	Platinum	80,000^{^}
United States (RIAA)	Platinum (Latin)	100,000^{^}
Venezuela	Gold	
^{^} Shipments figures based on certification alone.

=== Year-end charts ===
Chart (2006)	Position
Mexican Album (Top 100 México)	16
Mexican Spanish Album (Top 100 México)	12
Chart (2007)	Position
Mexican Albums (Top 100 México)	92

== Awards ==
=== Latin Grammy ===
Year	Title	Result
2006
2006	Album of The Year	Nominated
2006	Best Alternative Music Album	Won
2006	Producer of The Year (Cachorro López)	Won

=== Grammy Award ===
Year	Title	Result
2006
2006	Best Latin Pop Album	Won

== Release history ==
Country	Date	Label
Spain	May 25, 2006	Sony BMG
Italy	May 30, 2006	Sony BMG
Mexico	May 30, 2006	Sony BMG
Switzerland	June 6, 2006	Sony BMG
United States	June 6, 2006	Sony Music International
