= Primer día =

"Primer Día"

Single by Julieta Venegas and Dante Spinetta

from the album Limón y Sal
- Language: Spanish
- Released: May 2007 (Europe); June 1, 2007 (America)
- Recorded: Mondomix (Buenos Aires, Argentina)
- Length: 3:57
- Label: Ariola; Sony BMG
- Songwriters: Julieta Venegas, Dante Spinetta
- Producer: Cachorro López

Julieta Venegas singles chronology
"Eres Para Mí" (2007)	"Primer Día" (2007)	"Perfecta" (2007)

"Primer día" (English "First Day") is a song by American singer Julieta Venegas and Argentinean rapper Dante Spinetta, which was the fourth single from the album Limón y Sal.

== Song information ==
The song was written for Julieta Venegas and Dante Spinetta and produced by Cachorro López. The song is about two people who have finished already but for the first time will say what you feel after having finished their relationship.

== Video music ==
The video was shot in a city in Argentina, the director was Joaquín Cambre.

The video shows Dante Spinetta walking down the city with a typical fruit vendor attire, pushing a kart loaded with watermelon, while Julieta, dressed in Asian motifs, tours the city in the back seat of a taxi. The two meet by chance when the taxi accidentally cuts Dante's way abruptly and the fruit splatters on the street.

The audience is then shown a series of still takes and animations of Julieta dressed as a stereotypical ninja fighting with a sword, while Spinetta raps in front of typical ninja-movie imagery. After a little singing in the cab, another set of stills and animations with the singers dressed up in a more modern style with slot machine and other casino imagery in the background. Then Julieta sings in the taxi a little more.

After that, both styles of the previous animations are shown. Then Venegas and Spinetta are seen walking through a street market, singing the rest of the song.

== Tracking list ==
CD Single

1. "Primer Día" featuring Dante Spinetta — 3:56

== Chart ==
=== Weekly charts ===
Chart performance for "Primer Día"
Chart (2007)	Peak position
Colombia (EFE)	9
Mexico (Monitor Latino)	37
Russian Airplay (TopHit)	466
Spain (PROMUSICAE)	13
Venezuela Pop Rock (Record Report)	6
