= Cómo sé =

"Cómo Sé"

Single by Julieta Venegas

from the album Aquí
- Language: Spanish
- Released: 1997
- Recorded: Mad Hatter Studios, Bomb Factory, Cam A Recorders & La Casa, Los Angeles & El Ensayo State of Mexico, Mexico
- Genre: Alternative rock, rock
- Length: 3:12
- Label: Ariola; BMG
- Songwriter: Julieta Venegas
- Producers: Emmanuel Del Real, Quique Rangel, Joe Chiccarelli

Julieta Venegas singles chronology
"De mis pasos" (1997)	"Cómo Sé" (1997)	"Sería feliz" (2000)

"Cómo Sé" (How I Know) is a song written by the Mexican singer Julieta Venegas and included in her album debut, Here.

The song was written by Julieta Venegas and produced by Gustavo Santaolalla. It was released as her second single in 1997.

== Song ==
It was written by Julieta Venegas. It treats on the culmination of a loving relation, and the as it is preferable the leave side this if the contraparte already did it. In 2007 it made a new version for his album MTV Unplugged, with the participation of Jaques Morelenbaum touching the Cello.

== Video musical ==
The video begins with a girl that finds playing with his casita of toy and see three dolls of cardboard (that they are three Julietas), and the girl goes planting a grimace dressed like a Jewish and begins to sing without having movement the doll and afterwards adds the band and v changing continuously of doll and at the end puts a bed, a case and a car in which Julieta goes up and goes .

Year	Smart	Position
1998	The 100 + Requests of 1998 (North)	18

== Smart of songs ==
CD Single/Promo

1. Cómo sé

== Prizes and nominations ==
- MTV Video Music Awards
  - "Better Feminine Interpretation"
