= Bueninvento =

Studio album by Julieta Venegas
- Released: August 21, 2000
- Recorded: 1999–2000
- Genre: Alternative rock
- Length: 55:09
- Language: Spanish
- Labels: Ariola; BMG
- Producers: Gustavo Santaolalla, Emmanuel del Real Díaz

Julieta Venegas chronology
Aquí (1997)	Bueninvento (2000)	Sí (2003)

Singles from Bueninvento
- 1. "Sería feliz" Released: 2000; 2. "Hoy No Quiero" Released: 2000; 3. "Siempre en Mi Mente" Released: 2001

Professional ratings
Review scores
Source	Rating
AllMusic	link

Bueninvento ("Goodinvention") is the second album released by Mexican singer-songwriter and instrumentalist Julieta Venegas in 2000 to critical acclaim. "Sería Feliz" (translated as "I'd be happy") was the single released for this album, accompanied by a video that received rotation on music TV channels. The album was nominated for Latin Grammy Award for Best Rock Solo Vocal Album. In addition, Bueninvento was named the 4th best album of the 2000s decade by Latin music website Club Fonograma. In 2012, Rolling Stone ranked Bueninvento third in its list of "The 10 Greatest Latin Rock Albums of All Time."

== Track listing ==
This album comprises 14 songs, all written by Venegas with the exception of the song "Siempre en Mi Mente" written by Juan Gabriel.

No.	Title	Writer(s)	Producer(s)	Length
1.	"Fe (Faith)"	Venegas	Joe Chiccarelli	3:39
2.	"Hoy No Quiero (I Don't Want Today)"	Venegas	Del Real, Quique Rangel, Chiccarelli	3:13
3.	"Casa Abandonada (Abandoned House)"	Venegas	Chiccarelli	4:07
4.	"Enero y Abril (January and April)"	Venegas	Del Real, Rangel, Chiccarelli	3:34
5.	"Voluntad (Volition)"	Venegas	Chiccarelli	4:28
6.	"Salvavidas (Life Jacket)"	Venegas	Del Real, Rangel, Chiccarelli	3:43
7.	"Siempre en Mi Mente (Always On My Mind)"	Juan Gabriel	Santaolalla, Aníbal Kerpel^	4:04
8.	"Flor (Flower)"	Venegas	Del Real, Rangel, Chiccarelli	3:57
9.	"Todo Inventamos (We Invent Everything)"	Venegas	Chiccarelli	3:08
10.	"Bueninvento (Goodinvention)"	Venegas	Chiccarelli, Santaolalla	3:10
11.	"Sería Feliz (I Would Be Happy)"	Venegas	Chiccarelli	3:25
12.	"Otro Sol (Another Sun)"	Venegas	Antonio Hernandéz, Ricardo Haas, Chiccarelli	5:10
13.	"Instantánea (Snapshot)"	Venegas	Chiccarelli	4:24
14.	"Sueño de Sombras (Shadow Dream)"	Venegas	Chiccarelli	4:35

^ Associate producer

== Singles ==
- Sería Feliz
- Hoy No Quiero
- Siempre en Mi Mente

== Personnel ==
- Julieta Venegas - Vocals, keyboards, accordion, piano, acoustic guitar, electric guitar, programming, wurlitzer, composer
- Quique Rangel - Producer, guitar, double bass
- Emmanuel Del Real - Producer, twelve-string guitar
- Gustavo Santaolalla - Producer, guitar, ronroco, tuba
- Rick Boston, Fernando Saunders, Ernesto Martinez - Bass guitar
- Joe Gore - acoustic guitar, electric guitar, mandolin
- Álvaro Henríquez, Juan Manuel Ledezna - Guitar
- Luis Alberto Ledezna, Curt Bisquera - Drums
- Michito Sánchez, Luis Conte - Percussion
- Javier Casalla - Violin
- Frankie Blue, Toy Hernandéz, Patrick Shavellin - Programming
- Joey Waronker - Drums, percussion
- Mitch Mannon - Trumpet
- Kim Bullard - Hammond organ B3
- Claudio Tarris, Novi Novog - Viola
- Steven Berlin - Midin mix, tenor saxophone, Flute

=== Production ===
- Producers: Gustavo Santaolalla, Emmanuel Del Real
- Co-producer: Anibal Kerpel
- Engineers: Joe Chiccarelli, Daniel Méndez, Partick Shavelin, Anibal Kerpel, Emmanuel Del Real, Quique Rangel, Luis Roman, Antonio Hernandéz, Carlos Arredondo, Ricardo Haas
- Mixing: Joe Chiccarelli
- Assistant mixing: Patrick Shevelin, Travils Smith, Jordan Scher, eric Geverlik, Edgar Hernandéz "Chicaras", Carlos Arredondo
- Pro tools production: Daniel Méndez
- Mastering: Tom Baker
- Art direction: Adrián Posse
- Photography: Mariana Yazbek, Tomas Casademust, Fernando Velazco
- Photography: Marcela Guadiana

== Charts ==
Chart (2000)	Peak position
Mexican Albums (Top 100 Mexico)	7

== Awards and nominations ==
- Latin Grammy

Year	Title	Result
2000
2000	Best Rock Solo Album	Nominated
