= Limón y sal (song) =

Single by Julieta Venegas

from the album Limón y Sal
- Language: Spanish
- Released: August 30, 2006
- Recorded: Mondomix (Buenos Aires, Argentina)
- Length: 3:08
- Label: Ariola; Sony BMG
- Songwriters: Julieta Venegas, Jorge Villamizar
- Producer: Cachorro Lopez

Julieta Venegas singles chronology
"Me voy" (2006)	"Limón y sal" (2006)	"Eres Para Mi" (2007)

"Limón y sal" (English: Lemon and Salt) is Julieta Venegas' second single release from her fourth studio album of the same name. Released in Mexico and USA on August 30, 2006.

The song was written by Julieta Venegas and Jorge Villamizar (Ex-vocalist of Bacilos) and produced by Cachorro López. The song is about the acceptance of a loved one, their strengths and weaknesses.

== Music video ==
The music video seems to be inspired by classic fairy tales and films from the early 20th century in which she appears in a forest filled with half-human creatures. In the video, Julieta meets a werewolf, and both fall for each other. They start living in a little cabin in the woods, but when the full moon comes, the werewolf runs away and suddenly becomes a very attractive man.

Mesmerized by these new looks, he goes home with the intention of having a romantic picnic with Julieta, but when she looks at him she's distraught and starts to scream in horror, fainting right away. In her sleep, she dreams of a unicorn and an old man. Two pig-headed gentlemen then escort her through a forest, while the old man turns out to be a wizard who invokes apples in order to scare the pigs away. She court-dances with all of them for a while until the real-world's forest satyr plays its horn, waking her up to find her beloved werewolf back to his usual self.

== Tracking list ==
CD Single

1. "Limón y sal" — 3:08

CD Promo

1. "Limón y Sal" (Julieta Venegas) — 3:08
2. "No Me Diga Que No [Boy Like You] (Nikki Clan) — 2:56
3. "La Excepción" (Gustavo Cerati) — 4:11

== Charts ==
Chart performance for "Limón y Sal"
Chart (2006–2007)	Peak position
Argentina (Associated Press)	5
Chile (Associated Press)	4
Paraguay (Lincoln Journal Star)	9
Spain (PROMUSICAE)	2
US Latin Pop Airplay (Billboard)	24
Uruguay (Associated Press)	2
