= Los Momentos =

Studio album by Julieta Venegas
- Released: 19 March 2013
- Recorded: 2012
- Genres: Electropop; indietronica; pop; alternative rock
- Language: Spanish
- Label: Sony Latin
- Producers: Julieta Venegas, Yamil Yerzc

Julieta Venegas chronology
Otra Cosa (2010)	Los Momentos (2013)	Algo Sucede (2015)

Singles from Los Momentos
- 1. "Tuve Para Dar" Released: November 2012; 2. "Te Vi" Released: January 22, 2013

Los Momentos (transl. The Moments), the sixth studio album by Mexican recording artist Julieta Venegas, was released 19 March 2013 by Sony Music Mexico. The first single from Los Momentos is "Tuve Para Dar," and the album features collaborations with Ceci Bastida, Natalia Lafourcade, Ana Tijoux and Rubén Albarrán (vocalist from Café Tacvba).

== Background ==
After Venegas' last performance on her worldwide "Otra Cosa Tour," she announced a break to begin recording her new studio album. She stated in an article with the Mexican newspaper Milenio that it would be recorded from home so she could play the dual role of recording artist and mother. After a nine-month hiatus from performing, the "European Tour July 2012" was announced on July 4, 2012, with scheduled stops in France, several cities in Spain and Germany. Upon return from the tour to Mexico City in August, Venegas continued recording her album and posted its progress with photos and videos on her official website as well as her Facebook fan page. On October 8, 2012, she performed a series of concerts in Colombia where she spoke to the press about the new album which would be produced by herself and producer Yamil Rezc. On October 16, 2012, Julieta Venegas announced on Twitter, "I have the title for the album! It's called Los Momentos ... and the first single is called Tuve para dar."

== Promotion ==
On January 18–20, 2013, Julieta Venegas performed at the Festival de Olmué in Chile, and on March 5, 2013, she visited Volkshaus Zurich in Zurich, Switzerland to promote the album.

== Track listing ==
No.	Title	Length
1.	"Hoy"
2.	"¿Por qué?"
3.	"Te vi"
4.	"Nada importante"
5.	"Verte otra vez"
6.	"Vuelve"
7.	"No creí"
8.	"Volver a empezar"
9.	"Tuve para dar"
10.	"Los momentos"
11.	"Un poco de paz"

== Singles ==
The first single will be released from this album is "Tuve para dar" which will be released in November 2012. The song was inspired by the situation in Mexico and the difficult times the country is experiencing. The video for the single was recorded in Mexico City and released along with the single and was directed by Gregory W. Allen and Yvonne Venegas.

== Charts ==
=== Weekly charts ===
Weekly chart performance for Los Momentos
Chart (2013)	Peak position
Argentine Albums (CAPIF)	2
Mexican Albums (Top 100 México)	22
Spanish Albums (Promusicae)	35
US Top Latin Albums (Billboard)	12
US Latin Pop Albums (Billboard)	5
