= Dante Spinetta =

Argentine musician (born 1976)

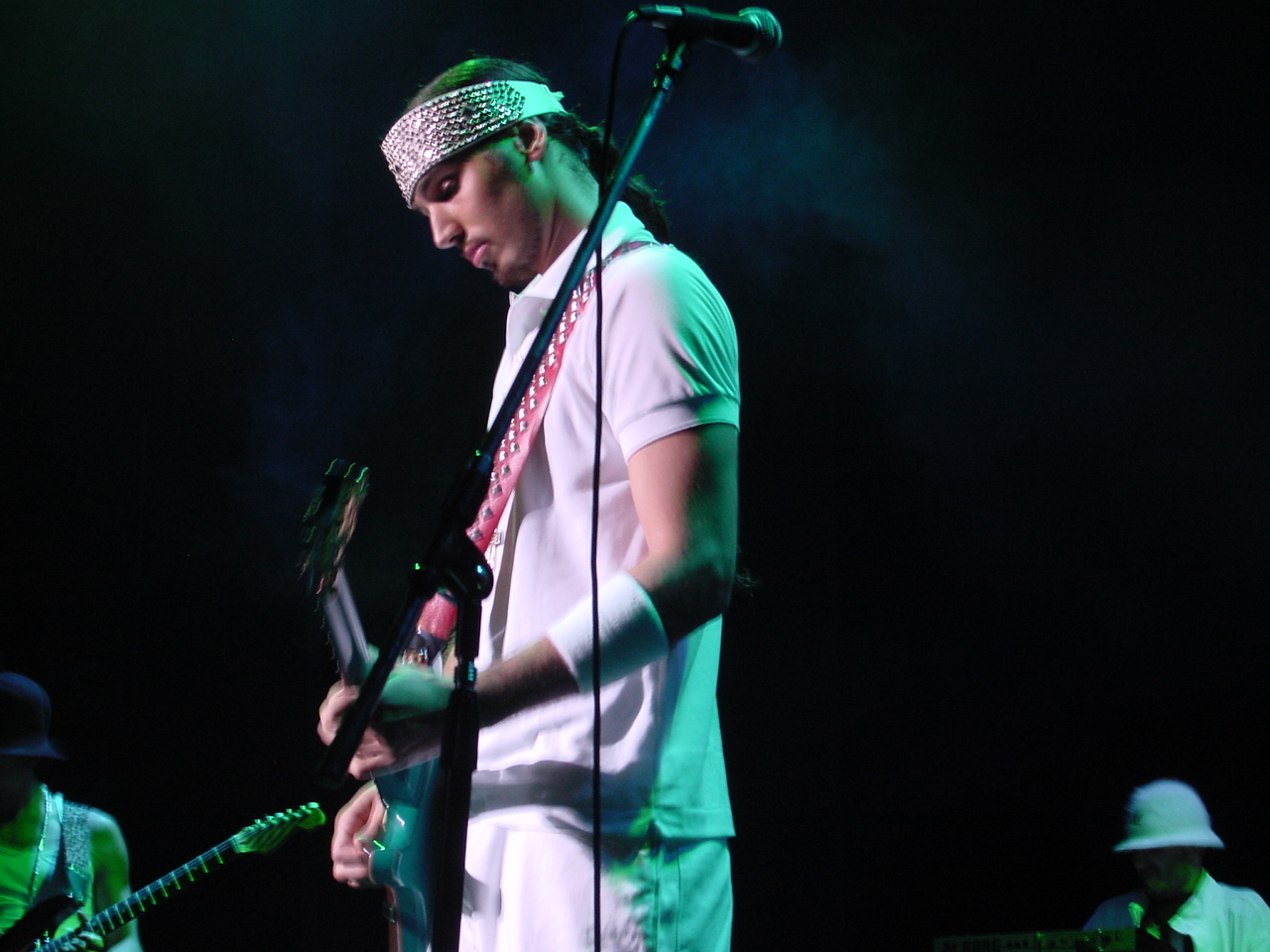
- Spinetta performing in Buenos Aires.

Background information
- Born: Dante Spinetta Salazar; December 9, 1976 (age 49)
- Origin: Buenos Aires, Argentina
- Genres: Rap; Soul; R&B
- Occupation: Musician
- Instruments: vocals guitars
- Years active: 1991–2001 (Illya Kuryaki); 2002–present (as soloist); 2011–present (Illya Kuryaki)
- Label: Universal Music México
- Member of: Illya Kuryaki and the Valderramas
- Website: http://www.dantespinetta.com/

Dante Spinetta (born December 9, 1976, in Buenos Aires, Argentina) is an Argentine singer/composer who is part of the duo Illya Kuryaki and the Valderramas.

== Biography ==
Spinetta was born on December 9, 1976; he is the son of the musician Luis Alberto Spinetta. At the age of 14 he started recording hip hop tunes.

In 2001 he married choreographer Majo Carnero and had a son, Brando de Dios and daughter Vida Uniqua.

== Musical career ==
In 1990 Spinetta joined Emmanuel Horvilleur to form the hip-hop duo Illya Kuryaki and the Valderramas. Together, they recorded seven albums and received several awards, including some Gold and Platinum albums.

After 10 years, the duo split and they decided to continue their careers as solo artists.

His first album Elevado was released in 2002. The album contained 17 songs, while first single released for this album was "Donde Vas" which was launched with a promotional video. In 2007 he released his second album, El Apagón, in which he experiments with reggaeton elements added to the hip-hop and rap styles used in his previous work.

Some other artists have recorded songs with him, like Julieta Venegas (in the song "Olvídalo") and Tony Touch (in the song "El Fogueo"). He also collaborated with Venegas on the song "Primer Día".

== Discography ==
=== Studio albums ===
- Elevado [High] (2002)
- El Apagón [The Blackout] (2007)
- Pyramide (2010)
- Puñal (2017)
- Mesa Dulce (2022)
- DÍA3 (2026)

=== Live albums ===
- Niguiri Sessions (2020)

=== Singles ===
- Donde Vas [Where are you going?] (2003)
- En La Mía [My own way] (2007)
- Olvidalo [Forget about it] (feat. Julieta Venegas) (2008)
- Seas Quien Seas [Whoever you are] (2008)
- Mostro [Monster] (2010)
- Pa Trás [Street talk for "Going Backwards"] (feat. Residente Calle 13) (2010)
- Pyramide (2011)
- Gisela (2011)
- Mi Vida [My life] (2017)
- Soltar (2018)
- Pesadilla Remix (feat. Neo Pistéa) (2018)
- Puñal (2018)
- Aves (2020)
- 1000 Flashes (2021)
- El Lado Oscuro Del Corazón (2022)

=== Featured Singles ===
- Primer día [First day] (collaborated with Julieta Venegas) (2006)
