= MTV Unplugged (Julieta Venegas album) =

Live album by Julieta Venegas
- Released: June 13, 2008
- Recorded: March 6, 2008; Churubusco Studios (Mexico City)
- Genre: Rock en español, alternative, Latin pop
- Length: 56:57
- Language: Spanish; Portuguese
- Label: Sony BMG
- Producer: Julieta Venegas

Julieta Venegas chronology
Realmente lo Mejor (2007)	MTV Unplugged (2008)	Otra Cosa (2010)

Singles from MTV Unplugged
- 1. "El Presente" Released: June 12, 2008; 2. "Algún Día" Released: September 10, 2008

Professional ratings
Review scores
Source	Rating
Allmusic	4/5 stars
Rolling Stone	3.5/5 stars

MTV Unplugged is the first live album recorded by Mexican singer-songwriter Julieta Venegas. The album features a selection of her greatest hits, along with new tracks, including the singles "El Presente" and "Algún Día". A handful of guest artists was included: Gustavo Santaolalla, Natalia Lafourcade, Cuarteto Latinoamericano, La Mala Rodríguez.

This album received the Latin Grammy Award for Best Alternative Music Album and the DVD released from this live performance also won for Latin Grammy Award for Best Long Form Music Video. "El Presente" was nominated for Record of the Year and Song of the Year.

== Album history ==
The live performance of this album was recorded in Mexico City, on March 6, 2008 at the Estudios Churubusco, before 450 fans. This show was broadcast on July 5, 2008 through MTV Latin America, and premiered on June 12, 2008 on the MTV Tr3s. The recording includes collaborations from La Mala Rodríguez performing the hip-hop section of "Eres para mí"; two-time Oscar-winner Gustavo Santaolalla playing banjo on "Algún día"; Brazilian singer Marisa Monte performing in "Ilusion", a brand new song in Spanish and Portuguese; Jaques Morelenbaum participating in "Como sé"; and Natalia Lafourcade included as a part of Venegas's band. Julieta Venegas played the accordion, guitar, and piano. On the track "Esta vez", the Cuarteto Latinoamericano is included, and Juan Son (from the band Porter) joined Venegas on "De mis pasos". The violet dress that the artist wore during the performance was designed by Andrés Jiménez.

Jose Tillan served as the executive producer and producer (along with Michael Dagnery) for MTV Networks.

== Track listing CD and DVD ==
The track listing by iTunes Store Mexico.

No.	Title	Writer(s)	Length
1.	"Limón y Sal"	Julieta Venegas, Jorge Villamizar	3:40
2.	"Sería Feliz"	Venegas	3:31
3.	"El Presente"	Venegas	3:41
4.	"Algo Está Cambiando"	Venegas, Coti Sorokin	4:11
5.	"Eres Para Mí" (featuring La Mala Rodríguez)	Venegas, Anamaría Tijoux, Rodríguez	4:43
6.	"Esta Vez"	Herrera, Venegas	3:27
7.	"Algún Día" (featuring Gustavo Santaolalla)	Venegas	4:01
8.	"Mírame Bien"	Venegas	3:50
9.	"Lento"	Venegas, Sorokin	4:26
10.	"De Mis Pasos" (featuring Juan Son)	Venegas	3:28
11.	"Andar Conmigo"	Venegas, Sorokin	3:59
12.	"Ilusión" (featuring Marisa Monte)	Venegas, Monte, Arnaldo Antunes	3:46
13.	"Como Sé" (featuring Jaques Morelenbaum)	Venegas	3:43
14.	"Mira La Vida"	Venegas	3:19
15.	"Me Voy"	Venegas	3:18

DVD/Blu-ray title1 = Limón y Sal
No.	Title	Writer(s)	Length
1.	Untitled	Julieta Venegas, Jorge Villamizar	3:40
2.	"Sería Feliz"	Venegas	3:31
3.	"El Presente"	Venegas	3:41
4.	"Algo Está Cambiando"	Venegas, Coti Sorokin	4:11
5.	"Eres Para Mí" (featuring La Mala Rodríguez)	Venegas, Anamaría Tijoux, Rodríguez	4:43
6.	"Esta Vez"	Herrera, Venegas	3:27
7.	"Algún Día" (featuring Gustavo Santaolalla)	Venegas	4:01
8.	"Mírame Bien"	Venegas	3:50
9.	"Lento"	Venegas, Sorokin	4:26
10.	"De Mis Pasos" (featuring Juan Son)	Venegas	3:28
11.	"Andar Conmigo"	Venegas, Sorokin	3:59
12.	"Ilusión" (featuring Marisa Monte)	Venegas, Monte, Arnaldo Antunes	3:46
13.	"Como Sé" (featuring Jaques Morelenbaum)	Venegas	3:43
14.	"Mira La Vida"	Venegas	3:19
15.	"Me Voy"	Venegas	3:18
16.	"Making of Julieta Venegas MTV Unplugged"		25:00

== Personnel ==
- Gustavo Borner: Recording engineer, mixing, mastering. Mixed at: Igloo Music (Burbank, California)
- Juan Pablo Falluca: Mobile recording
- Juan Carlos Ertze: Recording assistant
- Gabriel Castanon: Recording assistant
- Daniel Castillo: Recording assistant
- Alberto Rodríguez: Recording assistant
- Joseph Greco: Mixing assistant
- Justin Moshkevich: Mixing assistant
- Nikolai Baxter: Mixing assistant
- Guillermo Gutiérrez: A&R direction
- Gilda Oropeza: A&R
- Charlie García: Coordination
- Reyna Espinoza: Coordination

Live crew

- Claudio Jiménez: Sound engineer
- Marco López: Sound engineer
- Marcos Juache: Stage
- Kike Sánchez: Stage
- Liz Gil: Stage manager
- Mannu Mannucci: Tour & personal manager

Design

- Alejandro Ros: Concept
- Silvia Canosa: Design
- Enrique Covarrubias: Cover photography
- Nicolás Turchetto: Back cover and live photos
- Yvonne Venegas: Rehearsal photos
- Karla Ortíz: Wardrobe
- Lorena Ortíz: Assistant
- Juan Chialvo: Assistant
- Corina Figueroa: Assistant

== Musicians ==
- La Mala Rodríguez: Vocal on "Eres Para Mí"
- Gustavo Santaollala: Banjo and vocal on "Algún Día"
- Juan Son: Vocal on "De Mis Pasos"
- Marisa Monte: Vocal on "Ilusión"
- Jaques Morelenbaum: Cello on "Cómo Sé"
- Cecilia Bastida: Piano, rhodes piano, clavinet, glockenspiel, vocals
- Natalia Lafourcade: Vibraphone, banjo, timple, musical saw, cavaquinho, glockenspiel, clavinet, vocals
- Mariana Baraj: percussion, vocals
- Sol Pereyra: Trumpet, cuatro, ukulele, vocals
- Edy Vega: drums, percussion
- Ariel Cavalieri: Double bass
- Silvano Zetina: Guitar, timple, vihuela, cavaquinho
- Juan Martín Medina: Flute, guitar
- Leandro Guffanti: Clarinet, saxophone
- Alejandro Díaz: Tuba
- Aron Bitran: Violin
- Saúl Bitran: Violin
- Javier Montiel: Viola
- Alvaro Bitran: Cello
- Julieta Venegas: Lead vocals, piano, accordion and guitar.

== Chart and certifications ==
The album debuted at number 61 on the Mexican album charts, climbing to number-one the following week where it spent 10 consecutive weeks, replacing Para Siempre by Vicente Fernández and being replaced by A Little Bit Longer by Jonas Brothers. MTV Unplugged received a gold certification in México after two weeks of its release. In United States debuted and peaked at number 9 on the Billboard Top Latin Albums and at number 169 on the Billboard 200. It also peaked within the Top 20 in Spain and at number 39 in Switzerland.

=== Weekly charts ===
Chart (2008)	Peak position
Argentine Albums (CAPIF)	3
Mexican Albums (Top 100 México)	1
Mexican Albums (Digital Chart)	1
Spanish Albums (PROMUSICAE)	18
Swiss Albums (Schweizer Hitparade)	39
US Billboard 200	169
US Top Latin Albums (Billboard)	9
US Latin Pop Albums (Billboard)	4

=== Certifications ===
Region	Certification	Certified units/sales
Argentina (CAPIF)	Gold	20,000^{^}
Colombia	Gold	
Mexico (AMPROFON)	Platinum	80,000^{^}
Mexico (AMPROFON) Preloaded album	Diamond	400,000^{^}
^{^} Shipments figures based on certification alone.

=== Year-end chart ===
Chart (2008)	Position
Mexican Album (Top 100 México)	7
Mexican Spanish Album (Top 100 México)	5

== Awards ==
=== Latin Grammy Awards ===
Year	Nominee / work	Award	Result
2008	"El Presente"	Record of the Year	Nominated
2008	"El Presente"	Song of the Year	Nominated
2008	MTV Unplugged	Best Alternative Music Album	Won
2008	MTV Unplugged	Best Long Form Music Video	Won

=== Latin Billboard Awards ===
Year	Nominee / work	Award	Result
2009	"El Presente"	Hot Latin Song of the Year Female	Nominated
2009	"El Presente"	Latin Pop Airplay Song of the Year, Female	Nominated
2009	MTV Unplugged	Top Latin Album of the Year Female	Nominated
2009	MTV Unplugged	Latin Rock/Alternative Album of the Year	Nominated

== Release history ==
Country	Date	Label
Mexico	June 13, 2008	Sony International
Switzerland	June 20, 2008	Sony International
United States	June 20, 2008	Sony International
Spain	June 20, 2008	Sony BMG
