= Siempre en Mi Mente =

Siempre En Mi Mente

Studio album by Juan Gabriel
- Released: February 26, 1978
- Recorded: 1977
- Genre: Latin pop
- Length: 34:45
- Label: RCA
- Producer: Juan Gabriel

Juan Gabriel chronology
Te Llegará Mi Olvido (1978)	Siempre En Mi Mente (1978)	Espectacular (1978)

Siempre En Mi Mente (English: Always on my mind) is the ninth studio album by Mexican singer-songwriter Juan Gabriel, originally released in 1978 and re-released on July 30, 1996. This was the last album by Juan Gabriel with the RCA label.

== Track listing ==
No.	Title	Length
1.	"Siempre En Mi Mente"	3:25
2.	"María José"	3:28
3.	"Extraño Tus Ojos"	5:50
4.	"Canta, Vive y Sueña"	2:34
5.	"Lágrimas Tristes"	3:04
6.	"Denme Un Ride"	2:52
7.	"Adiós Cariño"	2:51
8.	"Mi Oración"	3:38
9.	"Cómo Me Haces Falta Tú"	2:46
10.	"Adiós"	4:10
