= Aquí =

Studio album by Julieta Venegas
- Released: March 24, 1997
- Recorded: 1995–1996
- Genre: Rock in Spanish, acoustic, alternative rock, folk rock
- Length: 48:37
- Language: Spanish
- Label: Ariola; BMG
- Producer: Gustavo Santaolalla

Julieta Venegas chronology
Aquí (1997)	Bueninvento (2000)

Singles from Aquí
- 1. "De mis pasos" Released: 1997; 2. "Cómo sé" Released: 1997

Aquí ("Here") is the debut studio album by Mexican singer-songwriter Julieta Venegas, released on March 24, 1997. The two singles released were "De Mis Pasos" and "Cómo Sé". It was rated 3.5 stars by AllMusic.

== Track listing ==
The album comprises 12 songs, all written by Venegas.

No.	Title	Length
1.	"Oportunidad (Opportunity)"	4:51
2.	"Antes (Before)"	4:00
3.	"De mis pasos (From My Steps)"	3:18
4.	"Cómo sé (How Do I Know)"	3:11
5.	"Libertad (Liberty)"	3:37
6.	"Con su propia voz (With His/Her Own Voice)"	5:24
7.	"Esta vez (This Time)"	3:21
8.	"Recuerdo perdido (Lost Memory)"	4:56
9.	"Andamos huyendo (We're Fleeing)"	3:46
10.	"Quitar a otras (Pull Off To Others)"	4:38
11.	"Sabiéndose de los descalzos (Identifying With The Barefoots)"	3:01
12.	"Verdad (Truth)"	4:34

== Singles ==
- De mis pasos
- Cómo sé
