= Me Voy (Julieta Venegas song) =

"Me voy"

Single by Julieta Venegas

from the album Limón y Sal
- Language: Spanish
- Released: March 28, 2006
- Recorded: 2005
- Studio: Mondomix (Buenos Aires, Argentina)
- Genre: Pop rock
- Length: 3:07
- Label: Ariola; Sony BMG
- Songwriter: Julieta Venegas
- Producer: Cachorro López

Julieta Venegas singles chronology
"Oleada" (2005)	"Me voy" (2006)	"Limón y sal" (2006)

Music video
- "Me Voy" on YouTube

"Me Voy" (English: "I'm Leaving") is a song by Mexican singer Julieta Venegas, released as the lead single from her fourth studio album, Limón y Sal (2006). It became Venegas's most commercially successful song to date. In 2025, Rolling Stone named it one of the greatest Spanish-language songs of the 21st century.

The single was released in Mexico on March 28, 2006, and in Europe in 2007, reaching high chart positions in countries such as Italy and Switzerland. At the 8th Latin Grammy Awards, it was nominated for Record of the Year, while its accompanying music video, directed by Picky Tallarico, received a nomination for Best Short Form Music Video.

== Song information ==
Written by Julieta Venegas and produced by Cachorro López, "Me Voy" is a Ranchera/Pop farewell song between two lovers. It is in the key of D major and 6/8 time.

=== Chart performance ===
The song reached the top of the US Billboard Latin Pop Airplay, also appears in the Hot Latin Tracks on #9. In Mexico the song spent twelve consecutive weeks at number one, and is certified as a gold record for sales in Mexico as high as ringtone. On February 18, 2007, "Me Voy" reached number 12 in the Schweizer Hitparade. In Spain, "Me Voy" reached the number-one position and spent 26 weeks on the Spanish Radio chart. In Italy, it reached number three on the radio. and iTunes digital downloads is the number two position. In several Latin American countries it reached the number-one spot.

== Music video ==
The video was directed by Picky Tallarico and recorded in Buenos Aires, Argentina.

The video begins with Julieta Venegas in a room where she is singing to a man but he is sleeping. She packs her things and flies off in a hot air balloon. She lands in a desert where she builds herself a home amongst the animals. She grows tired of her life there, and she flies away again and lands at the South Pole. She tries to live as a fisher woman with an igloo house, but once again tires of her life. Her last attempt at a happy home lands her in a forest, but she leaves this place as well. The video ends with her flying off into the sunset in her hot air balloon.

== Track listing ==
- Digital download
1. "Me Voy" – 3:08
- CD Single
1. "Me Voy" – 3:08
- European CD single and digital download
1. "Me Voy" – 3:08
2. "Lento" – 4:05
- German CD Single
1. "Me Voy" – 3:08
2. "Andar Conmigo" – 3:15
3. "Lento" – 4:00
4. "Algo Está Cambiando" – 4:00
5. "Me Voy" (Music video) – 3:08

== Personnel ==
- Songwriting, accordion, acoustic guitar, keyboards – Julieta Venegas
- Production – Cachorro López
- Bass – Guille Vadalá
- Recording – Mark Rankin
- Drums – Dany Ávila
- Acoustic guitars – Ernesto Snajer
- Percussions – Facundo Guevara
- Mixing – César Sogbe
- Mastering – José Blanco

== Charts and certifications ==
=== Weekly charts ===
Chart performance for "Me Voy"
Chart (2006–2007)	Peak position
Colombia (National-Report)	1
Italy (FIMI)	1
Mexico (Monitor Latino)	1
Spain (PROMUSICAE)	1
Switzerland (Schweizer Hitparade)	12
US Hot Latin Songs (Billboard)	9
US Latin Pop Airplay (Billboard)	1
Venezuela (Record Report)	5

=== Year-end charts ===
Chart (2006)	Position
Italy (FIMI)	7
US Latin Pop Airplay (Billboard)	17

Chart (2007)	Position
Switzerland (Schweizer Hitparade)	48

=== Certifications ===
Country	Certification	Date
Mexico	Gold	2006

== Release history ==
Region	Date	Format
Mexico	March 28, 2006	Digital download
Switzerland	May 19, 2006	Digital download
Italy	May 19, 2006	Digital download
Germany	September 10, 2006	CD single
Switzerland	May 4, 2007	CD single

== Awards and nominations ==
- Latin Grammy

Year	Title	Result
2006
2006	Record of The Year	Nominated

- Los Premios MTV

Year	Title	Result
2006
2006	Song of The Year	Nominated
2006	Video of The Year	Nominated
