= Julieta Venegas =

Mexican singer-songwriter (born 1970)

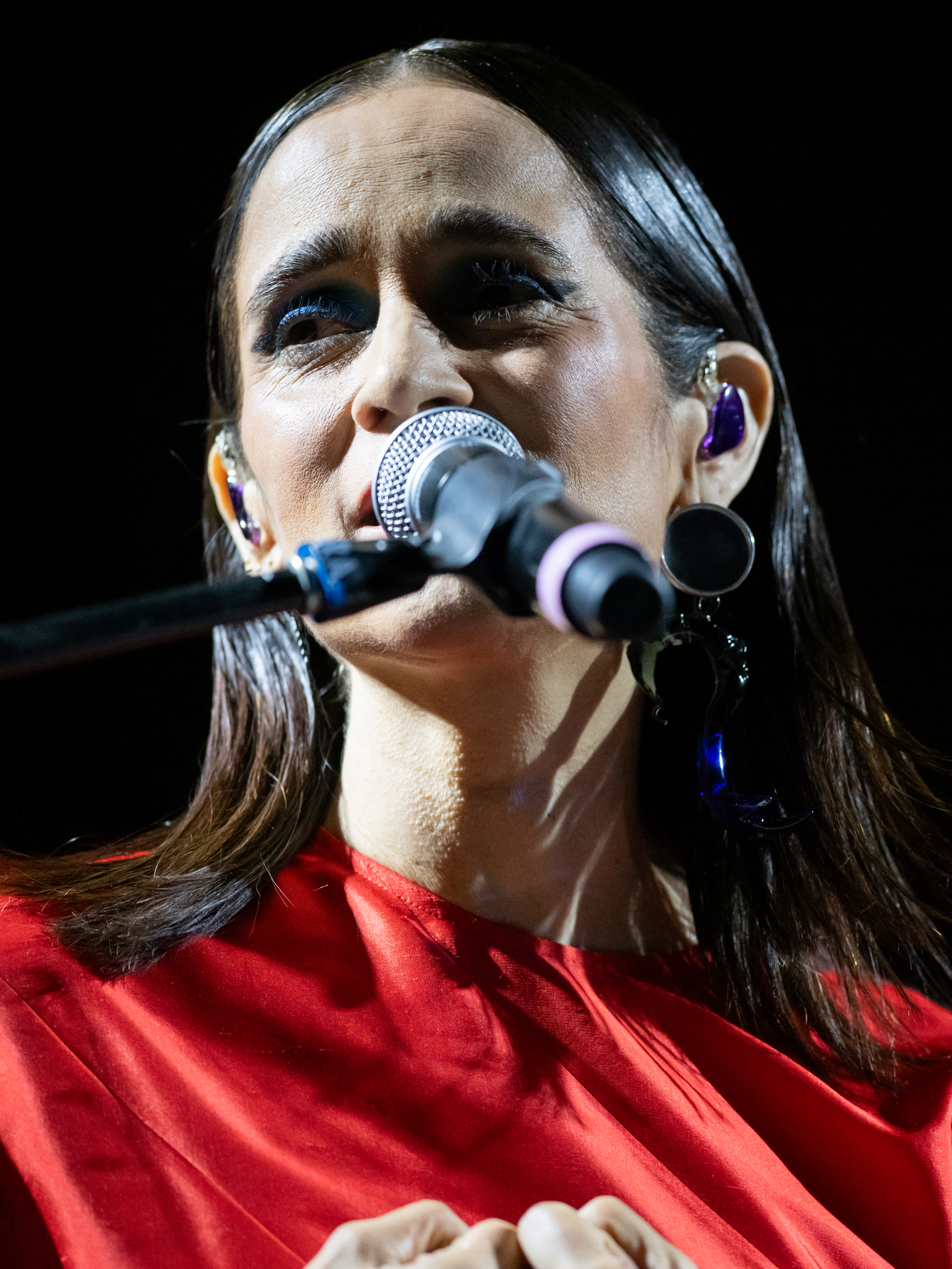
- Venegas in 2024

Background information
- Born: Julieta Venegas Percevault; 24 November 1970 (age 55); Long Beach, California, U.S.
- Origin: Tijuana, Baja California, Mexico
- Genres: Pop rock; indie pop; alternative music; folk rock
- Occupations: Singer-songwriter; musician; record producer
- Instruments: Vocals; accordion; guitar; keyboards
- Years active: 1992–present
- Labels: Ariola; BMG; Sony Latin; Sony Music
- Spouse: Álvaro Henríquez (m. 1998; div. 2000)
- Website: julietavenegas.net (in Spanish)

Julieta Venegas Percevault (Latin American Spanish pronunciation: [xuˈljeta βeˈneɣas]; (Note: In isolation, Venegas is pronounced [beˈneɣas].) born 24 November 1970) is a Mexican singer-songwriter. She specializes in Spanish indie pop rock and embarked on her musical journey by joining several bands, including the Mexican ska band Tijuana No!. Venegas is proficient in playing 17 instruments, including the acoustic guitar, accordion, and keyboard.

== Biography ==
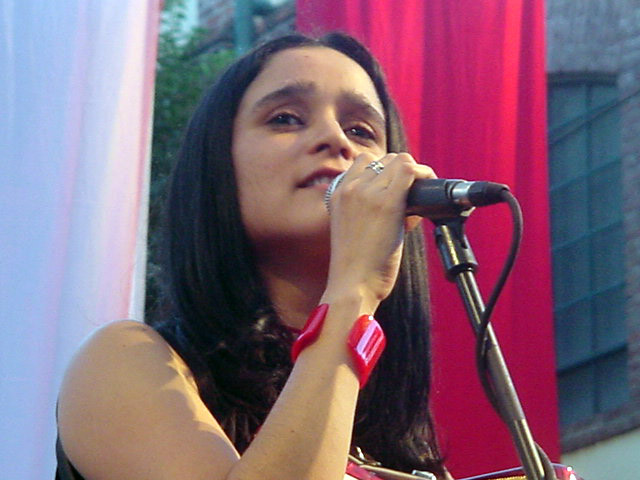
Venegas in 2000

Born in Long Beach, California, Venegas grew up in Tijuana, Mexico, since the age of one month old, and began playing instruments at the age of 8 when her parents first sent her to piano lessons. In the years that followed, music became her passion. She speaks Spanish, Portuguese, and English. Additionally, she has a twin sister named Yvonne, who is a photographer.

In 1997, she released her debut album, "Aquí," to favorable reviews in Mexico from the rock audience. Her subsequent production, "Bueninvento" (2000), also produced by Gustavo Santaolalla, garnered praise from international critics and was considered the third-best album in the history of Spanish Rock by Rolling Stone. In later years, she established herself as one of the most prominent songwriters in Latin pop, achieving fame in 2003 in Latin America and Spain with the album "Sí" and singles such as "Andar Conmigo" and "Algo está cambiando," which topped the Latin Billboard charts.

In 2006, she released her most successful album, "Limón y Sal," which remains her best-selling album to date. "Limón y Sal" attained Platinum status in several countries, propelled by the worldwide hit "Me Voy," certified Gold in Mexico. Her first live album, "MTV Unplugged" (2008), sold more than 400,000 digital copies, earning a diamond certification in Mexico. Under Sony Music, Venegas released her fifth studio album, "Otra Cosa" (2010). She followed with her sixth studio album, "Los Momentos" (2013), marking a transition to indie pop. Her seventh studio album, "Algo Sucede" (2015), debuted at number 1 on the Latin Pop Albums chart.

Since 2017, she has resided in Buenos Aires, where she made her debut as a theater actress in the play "La Enamorada" by Argentine writer Santiago Loza. Additionally, she released the album "La Enamorada" (2019), featuring themes based on the play. It is estimated that she has sold 10 million records worldwide. Throughout her career, she has earned eight Latin Grammy Awards, seven MTV Awards, seven Broadcast Music, Inc. Awards, five VEVO Certified awards, three Oye! Awards, two Billboard Music Awards, and over 100 other awards. She has also received accolades such as the Master of Latin Music Award at Berklee College for her career and a Musa Award in honor of her compositions. She had described the inspiration for her music with the following quote:

I mostly aspire to be a storyteller. I loved people like Suzanne Vega, and Lou Reed, or Cat Stevens, but it never occurred to me to write in English. I started listening to people like Silvio Rodriguez, who wrote some wonderful lyrics. When I went to live in Mexico City, I met a lot of people who helped and influenced me, like Café Tacuba, Gustavo Santaolalla, and they helped me to find my voice. Gustavo produced my first record, Aqui, in 1998, which was very important for me.

== Career ==
At the beginning of her career, she collaborated with a few bands in Tijuana, and then later in Mexico City.

=== 1997–1999: Aquí ===
With the support of BMG, Julieta Venegas recorded her first solo album with producer Gustavo Santaolalla. Released in 1997, Aquí contained twelve tracks composed by Venegas and was distributed in Mexico, Spain, and several Latin American countries. The material proved Venegas to be an extremely inventive artist in Mexican popular music. The first single from the album, "De Mis Pasos," was dramatically accepted by a young audience and quickly positioned as one of the best female rock songs of that time. The second single, "Como Sé," won the MTV award for "Mejor Interpretación Femenina." Following the international release of the album, Venegas received a large number of invitations to collaborate with different musicians and performers in Latin America, including Sasha Sokol, Enanitos Verdes, Sr. Gonzalez, Los Tres, Liquits, Cartel de Santa, León, and Enrique Bunbury.

In 1998, she participated in the tour "De Diva Voz" with Ely Guerra and Aurora y La Academia, appearing at different locations in Mexico and the United States. Soon after, she toured in "Calaveritas y Diablitos" next to Aterciopelados and Los Fabulosos Cadillacs in Spain. The same year she participated in the album Volcán: Tributo a José José, a tribute to the legendary Mexican singer José José. Venegas recorded the song "El Triste."

Her participation in international festivals increased the following year, and Venegas performed at "Midem Americas (Miami)," Generation Ñ "(in Spain)," Rock Al Parque de Bogotá (Colombia) and Festival "El Hatillo" (in Venezuela).

In 1999, she appeared in the Mexican version of the video "Infinito" by Bunbury. In 2000, Nacho Mastretta invited her to participate in her album "Luna de Miel," which consists of twelve songs performed by twelve female vocalists from different countries. Soon after that, Venegas contributed three songs to the soundtrack of En El País de No Pasa Nada. Soon after, Julieta Venegas wrote and recorded the song "Amores Perros Me Van A Matar" for the film "Amores Perros." The song was produced by Emmanuel del Real and Quique Rangel (Café Tacuba), who would also collaborate with Venegas on her next album, Bueninvento.

=== 2000–2002: Bueninvento ===
Bueninvento, also produced by Gustavo Santaolalla and Joe Chiccarelli, was launched in September 2000. It was recorded in Los Angeles (California), Monterrey and Mexico City. Thirteen of the fourteen songs are authored by Julieta Venegas including a tribute to Juan Gabriel – "Siempre En Mi Mente." In the same year, she participated in the "Arezzo Wave Love" in Italy, where she sang a version of the song "Amores Perros ..." in Italian, and joined the tour "Evolucion 2000" with Jaguares, Jumbo, and Gusana Ciega. She was also involved in the Hannover Fair as part of Music Bridges Around the World, which links to composers from around the world. Venegas joined the Cubadisco Festival in Havana, Cuba and the tour 'Femina Rock' with Maria Gabriela Epumer and other female figures in rock.

In 2002, the singer Victor Manuel called, offering for her to participate in a tribute to Joaquín Sabina along with other women by singing "Corre Dijó La Tortuga." She participated in several soundtracks including Maria Full of Grace with the song "Lo Que Venga Después," and Demasiado Amor with a two versions of the cover of Lupita D'Alessio's "Acariciame," one in collaboration with Mastretta and one with Joan Valent. She worked with Mastretta for the main theme of the Spanish film "El Sueño del Caiman."

Venegas sang "Niños," a duet with Spanish Pedro Guerra Ofrenda, and received by the same in the Persian Gulf where they sang a duet on the song "Cómo Sé" against the European media. She performed on the Soda Stereo album tribute to the song "Disco Eterno" which was nominated for a Grammy for "Best Rock Song: Hoy No Quiero" and "Best Alternative Rock Disco: Bueninvento." She took a brief break in her career and was dedicated to singing themes José José ("El Triste"), José Alfredo Jimenez ("Serenata Sin Luna") and Los Tigres del Norte ("La Jaula de Oro") and did duets with Celso Piña and ska "Los de Abajo" while preparing the songs for her upcoming album Sí.

=== 2003–2004: Sí ===
In late 2003 she released the album Sí on which she collaborated with Coti and "Cachorro Lopez." Sí was recorded in Argentina and Spain. As her most commercially successful release to date, it allowed her to reach a wider market. It has sold over a million copies, making the songs "Andar Conmigo," "Lento," and "Algo Está Cambiando" pop standards in Latin music. She was invited to perform, along with Pau Dones from Jarabe de Palo, a song for the soundtrack of the movie Asesino En Serie "El Listón de Tu Pelo," a tribute to Los Angeles Azules.

2004 was the most productive year professionally and spiritually for Julieta Venegas – MTVla prized her with three awards for "Artist of the Year," "Solo of the Year," and "Best Artist North." She was also awarded her first Latin Grammy in the category "Best Rock Album." She won 3 Awards for "Oye!" Mexico City in the categories "Artist of the Year," "Song of the Year: Andar Conmigo," and "Record of the Year: Sí." In 2004 she collaborated on the album Neruda En El Corazón with artists like Joan Manuel Serrat, Pablo Milanés and Ana Belén. It was responsible for putting music to the poem "A Callarse." She also participated in the "Diego Torres: MTV Unplugged" on the song "Sueños." Additionally, Venegas performed in the concert "El Sueño Existe" in homage to Salvador Allende in the Stadium Nacional de Chile, with Chilean and international artists as Gilberto Gil, The Prisoners, Leon Gieco, and Silvio Rodríguez, among others.

Venegas began her first international tour in Mexico and celebrated it with a memorable concert at the Teatro Metropolitan, which is reflected on the album Sí Special Edition. She is the first Latin artist to release a "Limited Edition DualDisc." Julieta Venegas was positioned with Latin artists with more international exposure, and was therefore requested to sing with various artists such as Lenine, El Cartel de Santa and Paulina Rubio. Sí was received with open arms in Viña del Mar, where it received the recognition Mar de Plata. Venegas was invited to record in Los Shajatos, singing in English "You've got Hide Your Love Away" and "Blackbird" by The Beatles.

Venegas also participated on "Tonto" on Vincentico's album Los Rayos, "Miedo" on MTV Unplugged Lenine, and on different musical scores for movies such as Hotel Tivoli ("El Fuego y El Combustible") and Sólo Dios Sabe (" Saudade " ft. Otto and "Lagrimas Negras").

=== 2005–2007: Limón y Sal ===
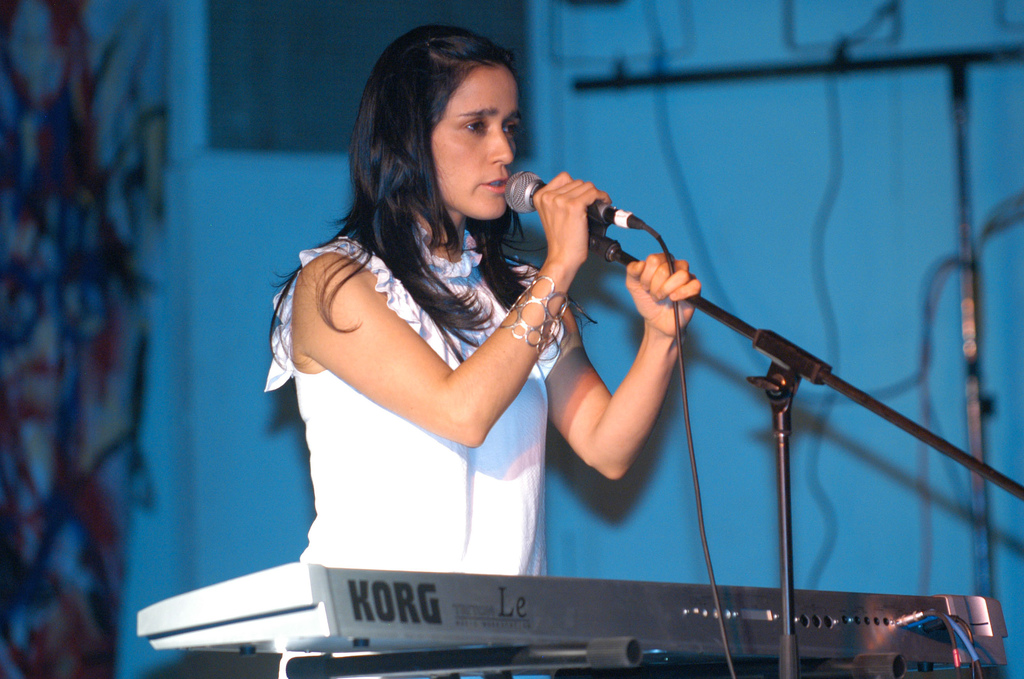
Singer Julieta Venegas participated in the 2006 "Mujeres sin miedo, todas somos Atenco" event.

Venegas took about a year to develop her next album, Limón y Sal, which was recorded in Buenos Aires with Cachorro López producing. When the first single "Me Voy," a Ranchera/Pop song, was released in March 2006, it quickly rose in popularity, transcending distance and language barriers as it was performed in English, Italian and Spanish.

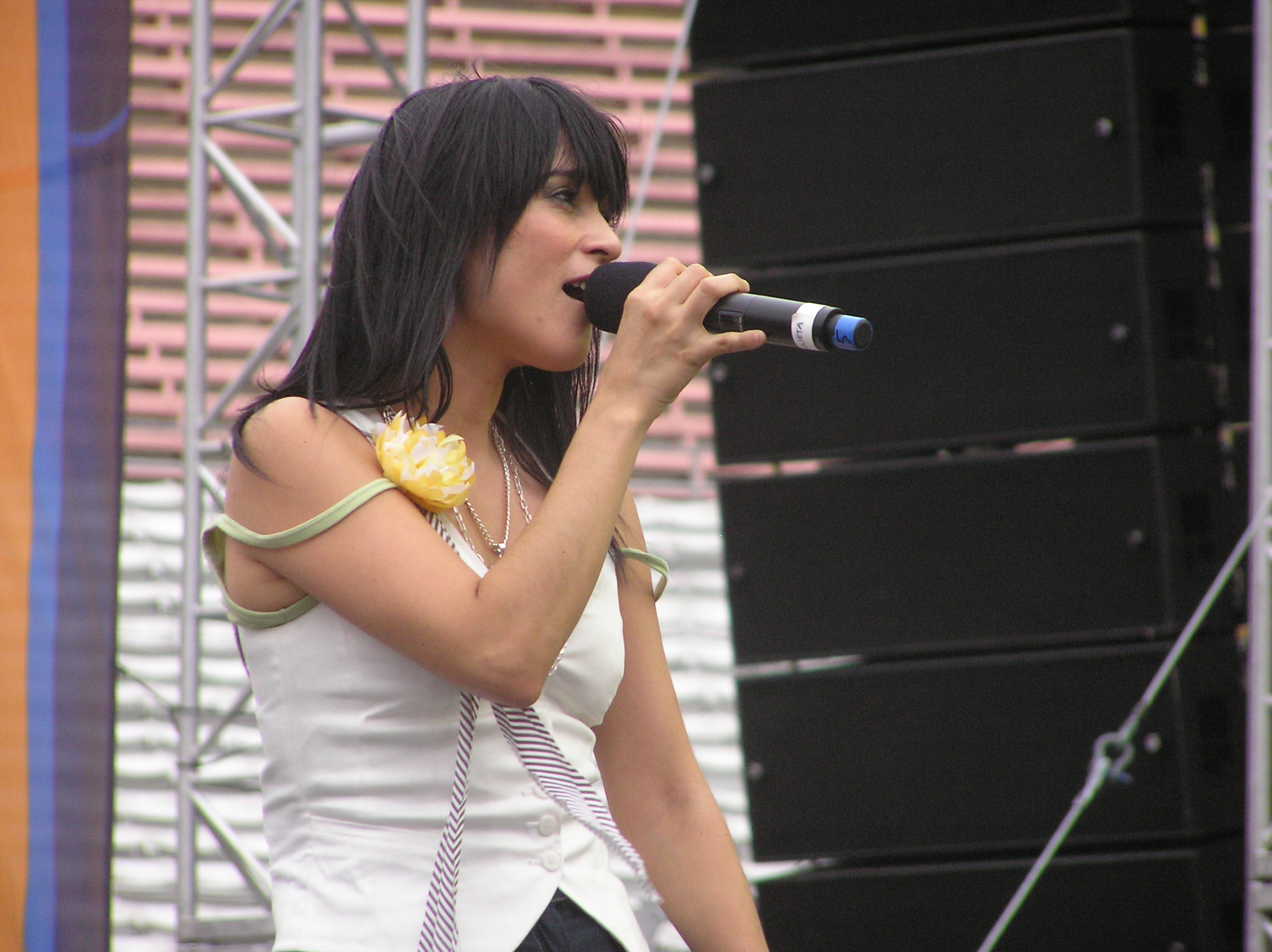
Venegas Los Angeles, 2006.

May saw the launch of Limón y Sal which was awarded a gold record for more than 50 thousand copies sold within two days of its launch. After a single week, it had received a platinum for 100 thousand records in Mexico and more golds for selling 50 thousand copies in both Spain and the United States. A few days later, the album received another gold record for more than 50 thousand copies in Italy. A total of 4 singles were released: "Me Voy," "Limón y Sal," "Eres para Mí," and "Primer Día"–a song that was supposedly only for Europe, but also caught American ears. At the same time, she paid tribute to Andrés Calamaro with "Sin Documentos."

In June 2006 in Spain, Venegas took part in the MTV Day festival with Amaral and Keane, among others. Two days later, she participated in the celebration of the fortieth anniversary of Los 40 Principales Radio Formula. She sang "Me Voy" and "Nada de Esto Fué Un Error" next to Coti. Venegas has participated in the Spanish series Yo Soy Bea, and the series was also involved in "SOS Mi Vida" Argentina on TV. In 2007 Venegas released a compilation album entitled Realmente Lo Mejor.

Venegas also collaborated on the Hector Buitrago album "Conector" with "Música Somos" before beginning a world tour that kicked off in Italy and made its way through other parts of Europe. Upon returning from Europe, she visited almost all of Latin America and the United States on her "Limón y Sal" tour. With regard to awards, she won her second Latin Grammy for "Best Alternative Album" and also won her first Grammy in a historic tie with Ricardo Arjona's album "Adentro."

=== 2008–2009: MTV Unplugged ===
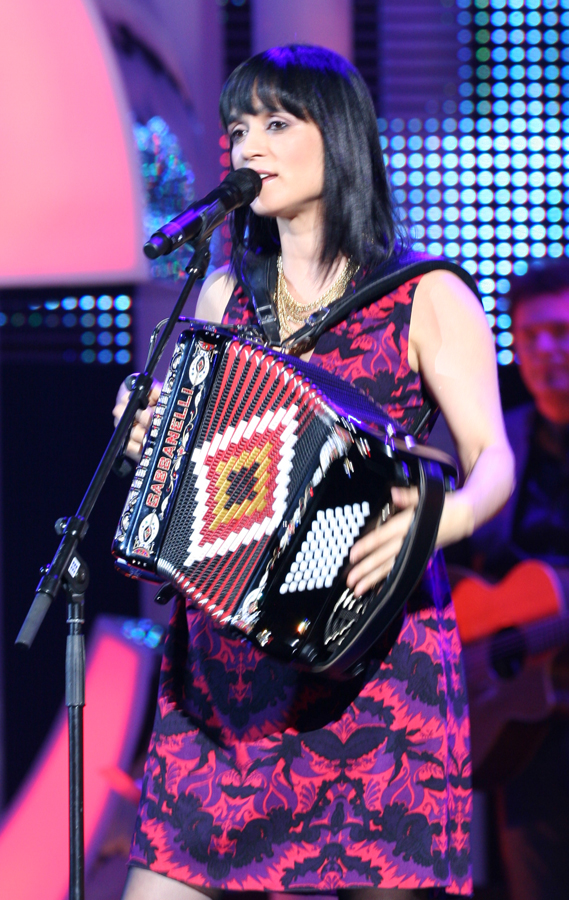
Nobel Peace Prize concert in 2008

The year 2008 was even more productive. On March 6 she recorded MTV Unplugged, which was ranked as "Very Successful," in addition to being the first to be recorded in Mexico. Artists joining Venegas for this live concert included Juan Son, La Mala Rodriguez, Marisa Monte, Natalia Lafourcade, Gustavo Santaolalla and an orchestra of 15 musicians. The show aired on June 5, 2008, on MTV Latin America. The album was released on June 17, and for it, she was named MTV Artist of the Month.

The MTV Unplugged record blends the ranchera touch with pop ballads that have been well received by the public. In Mexico the album debuted at number 61 on the Mexican album charts, climbing to number-one the following week where it spent 10 consecutive weeks. The album demonstrates that Venegas is an accordion of surprises, with songs like "Mira la Vida," "Algún Día," y "Cómo Sé" revealing Venegas as a mature artist, constantly reinventing herself and giving the public something new. The album was released internationally on June 10, producing strong sales and critical acclaim. One month after its release, Julieta Venegas was awarded a platinum disc for selling more than 100,000 records in Mexico, and two gold discs for selling more than 50,000 records in Colombia and the USA.

Julieta Venegas started an international tour visiting countries such as England and Germany, places that were not as familiar with music like hers. Her record was nominated for MTV Awards, Premios Luna del Auditorio and the Latin Grammy.

Also in 2008, she recorded a duet with French chanteuse Olivia Ruiz singing "Las Migas de Mi Corazón." At the MTV Awards LA she sang with the Electro/Norteño band Nortec Collective a unique version of "El Presente." On November 13, 2008, Julieta Venegas took home two Latin Grammy awards in the categories of "Best Alternative Album" and "Best Long Form Video." After her successful tour Venegas was invited by Nelly Furtado to participate in the song "Bajo Otra Luz" with La Mala Rodríguez.

=== 2010-2012: Otra Cosa and motherhood ===
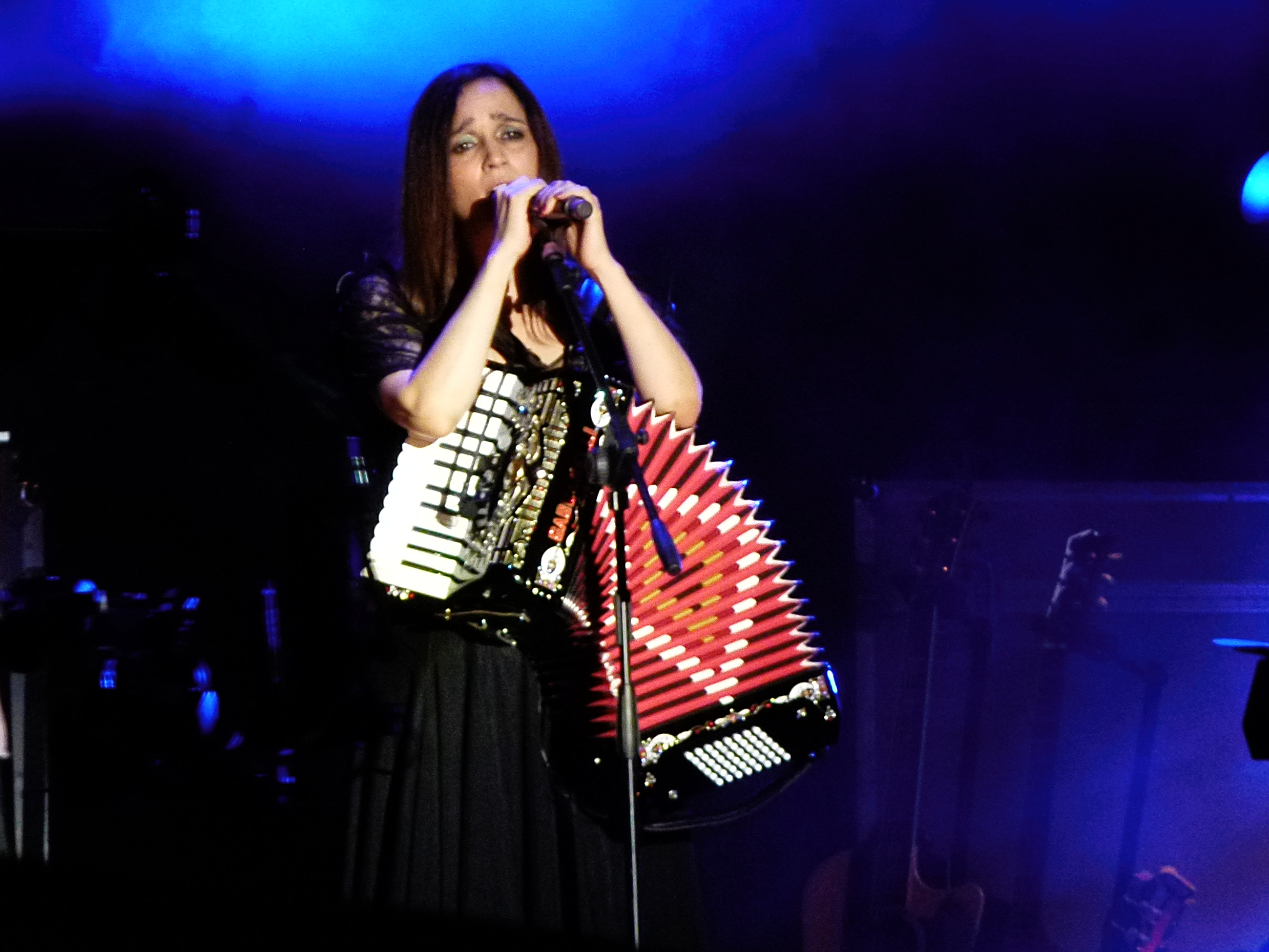
On Corrientes Avenue (Buenos Aires) during the Night of the Bookstores 2012.

Otra Cosa was released on Tuesday, March 16 in record stores and on iTunes. The first single was "Bien o Mal" written with Alejandro Sergi, vocalist of the band Miranda!, and released on March 16, 2010. Otra Cosa placed on the first and second positions of the "Top Albums" in the iTunes Latino store with her two Deluxe and Standard edition albums, according to the official website. Julieta Venegas became the first Latin artist to launch an iTunes LP. Four days after the official launch of Otra Cosa, Venegas earned a Gold Record in Mexico. The album contains 12 songs filled with acoustic and electric guitars, synthesizers, various percussion instruments, cavaquinhos, winds, subtle pianos (played by her), and accordions. Also seen in pictures posted in Twitter, Venegas mentions other instruments used on the album that include ukulele, bass, bouzuki, and tuba.

The album was produced by Venegas and Cachorro López (who also produced "Limón Y Sal"). Following the album's release Juieta Venegas toured the United States (sponsored by the brand Jack Daniels) in 16 cities, including New York City, Miami, Los Angeles and San Diego. Venegas performed in the Vive Latino Festival 2010, playing on two occasions, both in the Green Stage. She participated in a reunion with her former band, Tijuana No! and sang a duet with their new band member, Alexis Güereña, "Pobre de Ti." A few weeks prior to the release of the album, Julieta Venegas acknowledged that she was three months pregnant, but had not named the father.

On April 27, 2010, Venegas played some songs off the album at KCRW, an internet public radio station based at Santa Monica College. On August 13, 2010, Venegas gave birth to a baby girl named Simona in Mexico. Venegas, who is divorced, has never revealed the identity of the baby's father. The Argentine musicologist Rodrigo García Prieto won the paternity suit. The judges ruled that they will share custody of Simona and go to therapy to "resolve their emotional problems."

Venegas was featured in a 2012 musical documentary Hecho en México, directed by Duncan Bridgeman. The film focuses on the positive influences out of Mexico given the negative press out of the country south of the border because of the drug war. The film also includes other musical artists who contribute interviews and music to the film.

=== 2013-2014: Los Momentos ===
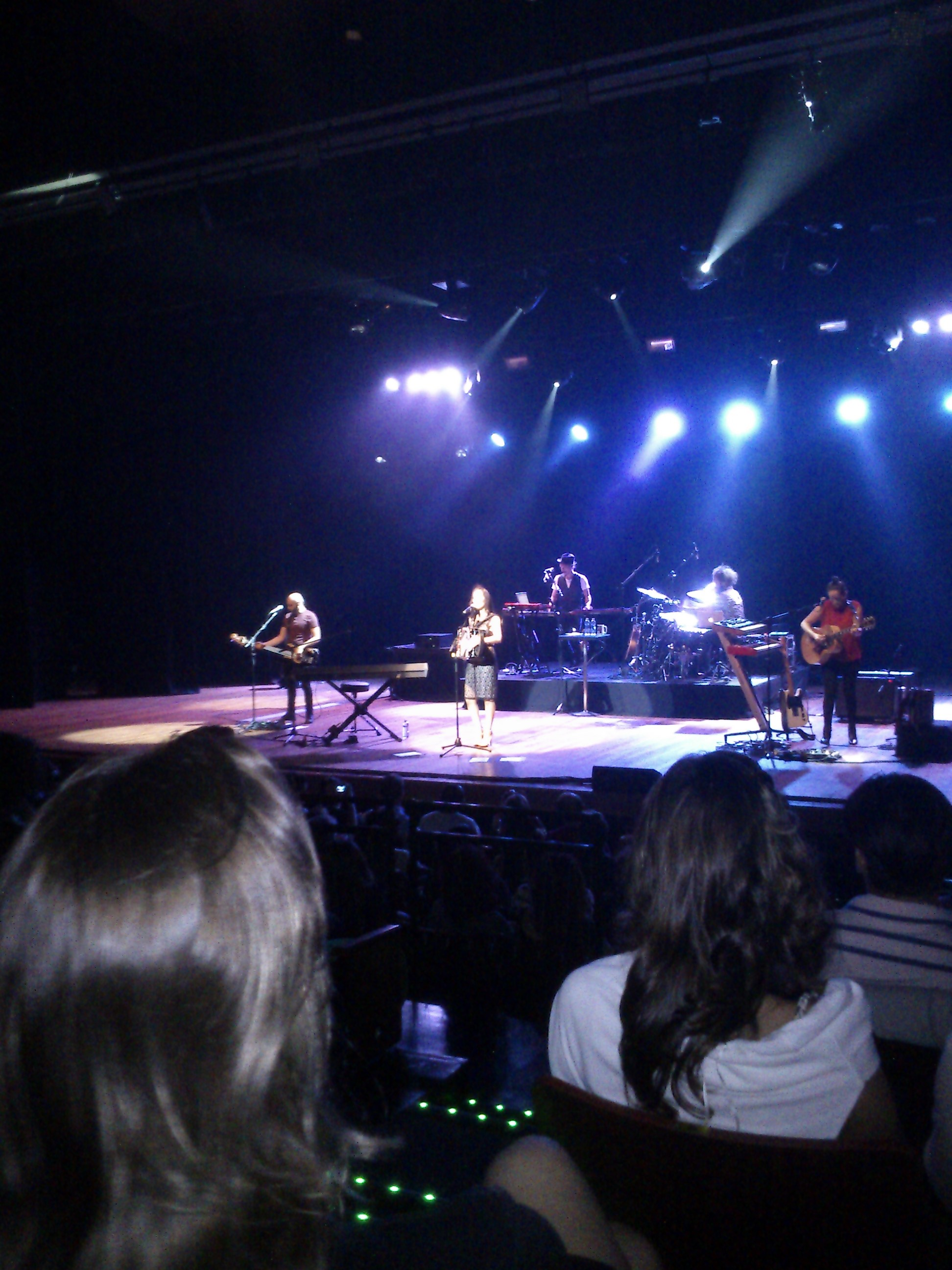
Julieta Venegas and band performing live, May 21, 2014, in Natal, Brazil.

Julieta Venegas’ sixth album, entitled Los Momentos, was recorded in Mexico City and produced by Venegas and Yamil Rezc. Launched March 12, 2013 through digital streaming, the album included special appearances by Ceci Bastida, Natalia Lafourcade, Anita Tijoux and Rubén Albarrán. It includes the song "Tuve Para Dar," which was released in November 2012. This album had a variety of electronic instruments as well as acoustic guitar and piano.

Prior to the album launch, the first single "Tuve Para Dar" was released on December 11, 2012, and was made available in digital version on December 18. The music video was directed by Gregory W. Allen and Yvonne Venegas.

On January 14, 2013, through the SoundCloud and YouTube portals, Venegas released "Te Vi" the second single from the album (considered by Sony Music to be the first). A digital download was made available on January 22.

=== 2015-2018: Algo Sucede ===
Venegas released her seventh studio album, Algo Sucede on August 14, 2015. It includes the lead single "Ese Camino," "Buenas Noches, Desolación," and additional singles "Tu Calor" and "Todo Está Aquí." Around that time she was living in Buenos Aires, Argentina with her daughter.

=== 2019-2023: La Enamorada and Tu Historia ===
Venegas released the conceptual album "La Enamorada" on November 22, 2019.

On October 5, 2021, Tainy and Bad Bunny released Lo Siento BB:/, in collaboration with Venegas. The song marked the first time she reached top 10 on Billboard's Hot Latin Songs chart in 14 years.

Remezcla recognized Venegas' song "Caminar Sola" as the top entry in their list of Best Indie & Alt-Rock Songs of 2022. Featured on her album "Tu Historia," this accolade underscores Venegas' prominence in the music industry.

=== 2024-present: Norteña ===
Venegas held a free concert in the Zócalo in Mexico City on March 16, 2024, which drew a crowd of more than 80,000 people. During the concert, she expressed her support in solidarity with those searching for missing persons.

On December 19, 2025, she was a special guest on the sixth night of Bad Bunny's Debí Tirar Más Fotos World Tour in Mexico, performing together in the Estadio GNP Seguros in Mexico City.

Venegas released her 10th studio album, Norteña, on May 13, 2026. It was produced by herself, and the collaborating artists include Natalia Lafourcade, Yahritza y su Esencia, and El David Aguilar. The album was released alongside a memoir called "Norteña: Memorias del Cominezo."

On May 29, 2026, Venegas released a new version the song "La niña futbolista", originally by Los Patita de Perro. The song was presented at the morning press conference of Claudia Sheinbaum as part of a cultural initiative by the Mexican government during the 2026 FIFA World Cup to promote the participation and inclusion of young girls in the sport. Shortly after the song was released, it garnered polarizing reactions, receiving both support and criticism on social media platforms. Venegas received negative comments, mockery, and hostile messages on various platforms, leading to comments being temporarily disabled on the song's official YouTube video.

== Legacy ==
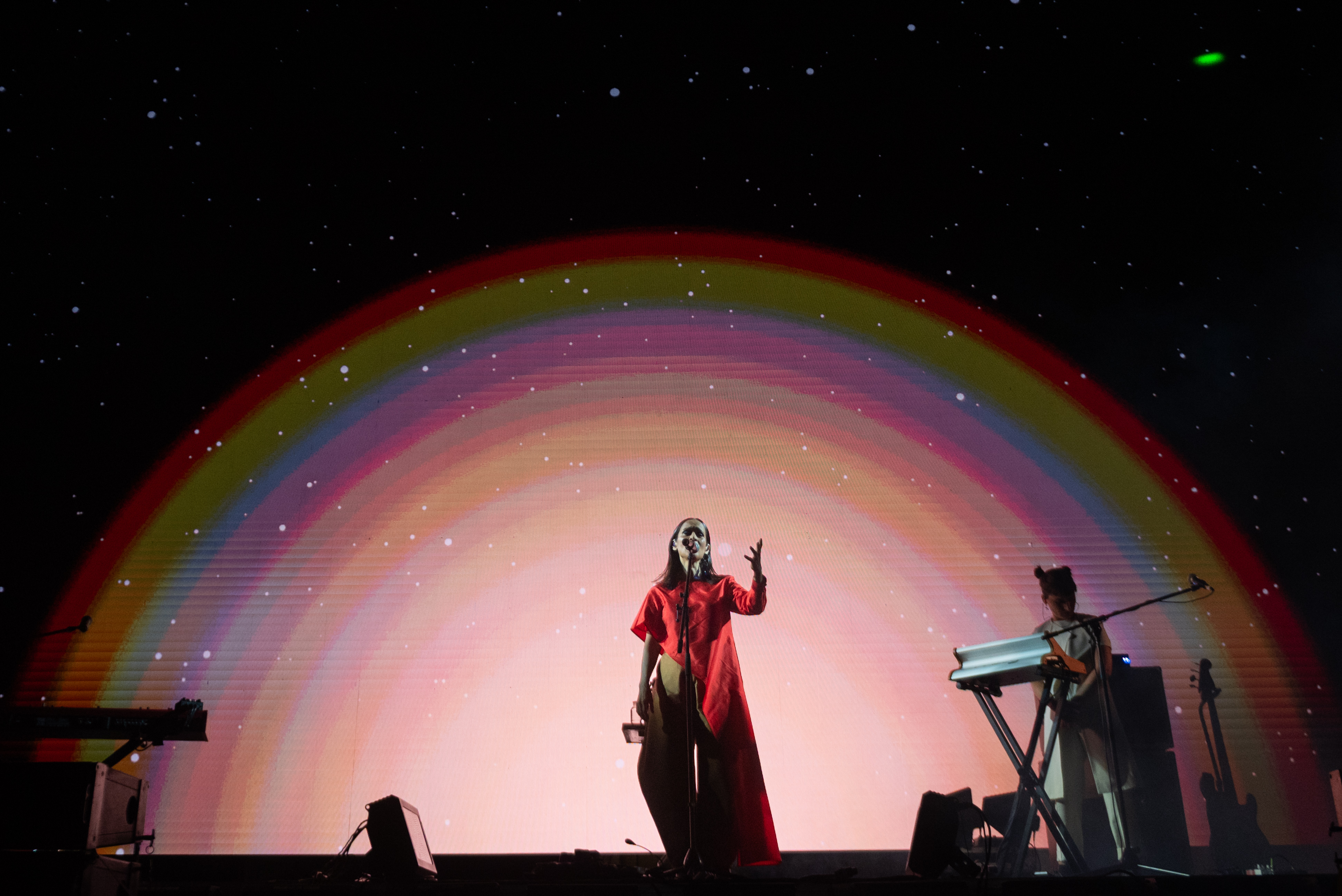
Venegas performing at the Zócalo in Mexico City in March 2024

According to Billboard "Venegas has maintained one of the most consistent yet understated careers since her solo debut, Aquí, more than two decades ago. A pioneer whose music and image have broken Latina stereotypes, Venegas has forged a path between Latin alternative and pop music, and supported the cresting of a strong wave of Mexican female artists." The Los Angeles Times praised "Her lyrics of wounded idealism and wrecked love affairs [which] extend a rich Mexican tradition of popular music imbued in bitter fatalism." While The Atlantic described her as having "a signature sound unlike anything else in the Latin charts." The website Medium wrote of Venegas, "She has a knack for stirring melodies, haunting harmonies and compelling rhythms. Her cunning lyrics work well as poetry but even better as song, running the thematic gamut from dense introspection to earnest simplicity." Time described Julieta Venegas as "the Frida Kahlo of rock 'n' roll."

Venegas was awarded the Master of Latin Music Award by Berklee College. She was the inaugural speaker in the USC Annenberg Distinguished Lecture Series on Latin American Art and Culture.

In 2012, Rolling Stone ranked her album Bueninvento third in its list of "The 10 Greatest Latin Rock Albums of All Time".

Natalia Lafourcade has cited Venegas as a major influence and described her as "my heaviest teacher." Ximena Sariñana has also credited Venegas as an influence in her sound. Among musician fans of hers include Zayra Alvarez, Nelly Furtado, Tania Libertad, Prince and Enrique Bunbury.

== Discography ==
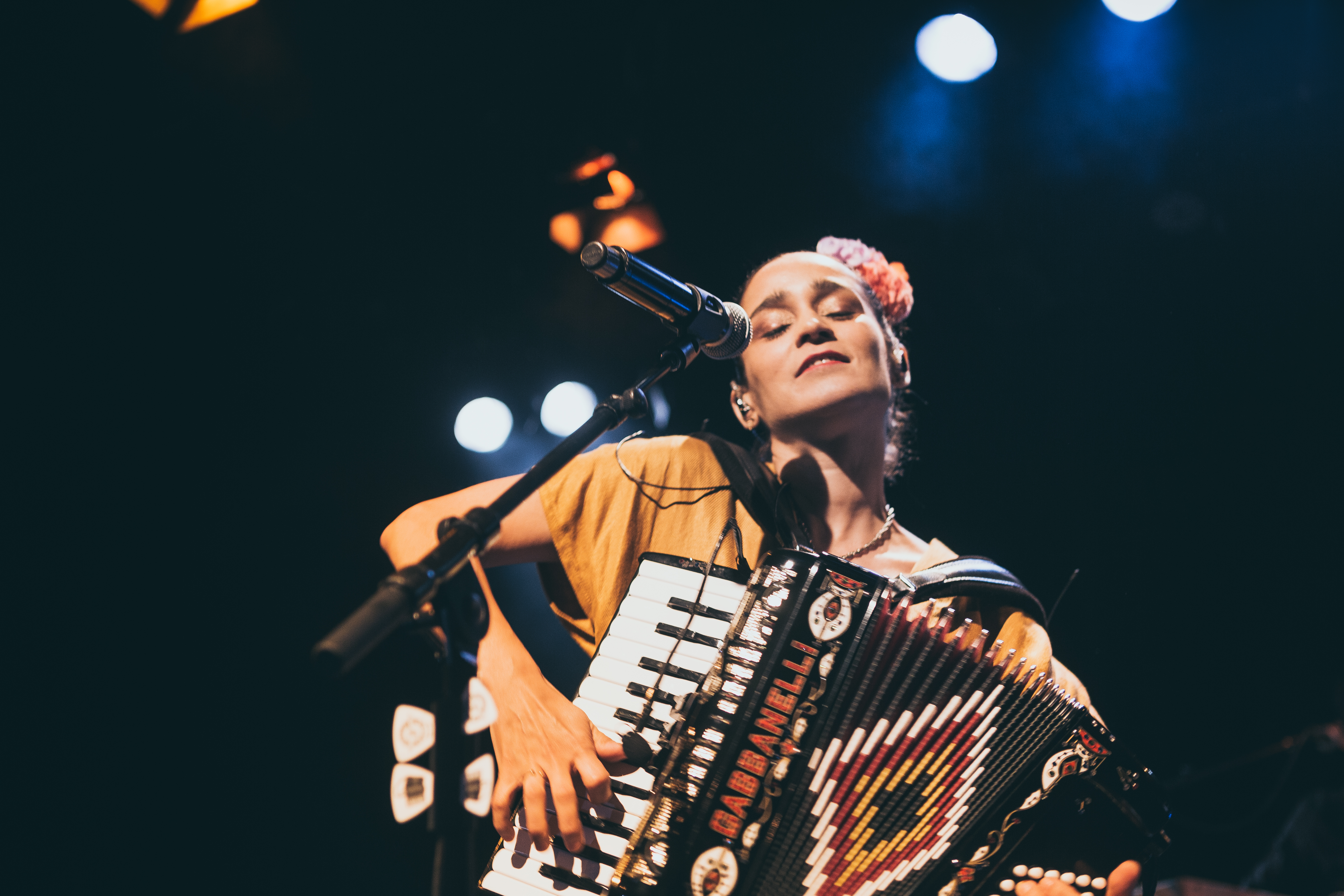
Julieta Venegas performing at the Intxaurrondo Kultur Etxea in San Sebastián

- Aquí (1997)
- Bueninvento (2000)
- Sí (2003)
- Limón y Sal (2006)
- Otra Cosa (2010)
- Los Momentos (2013)
- Algo Sucede (2015)
- Tu Historia (2022)
- Norteña (2026)

== Filmography ==
- Hecho en México (2012)
- El Santos vs. La Tetona Mendoza (2012)

== Awards and nominations ==
=== Grammy Awards ===
The Grammy Award is an accolade bestowed by the National Academy of Recording Arts and Sciences of the United States to recognize outstanding achievement on the music industry. Venegas has won one award from four nominations.

Year	Nominee / work	Award	Result
2016	Algo Sucede	Best Latin Pop Album	Nominated
2011	Otra Cosa	Best Latin Pop Album	Nominated
2007	Limón y Sal	Best Latin Pop Album	Won
2005	Sí	Best Latin Rock, Urban or Alternative Album	Nominated

=== Latin Grammy Awards ===
A Latin Grammy Award is an accolade bestowed by the Latin Academy of Recording Arts & Sciences to recognize outstanding achievement in the Latin American music industry. Venegas has won eight awards from 23 nominations.

Year	Nominee / work	Award	Result
2001	Bueninvento	Best Rock Solo Vocal Album	Nominated
2001	"Hoy No Quiero"	Best Rock Song	Nominated
2004	"Andar Conmigo"	Record of the Year	Nominated
2004	"Andar Conmigo"	Song of the Year	Nominated
2004	Sí	Best Rock Solo Vocal Album	Won
2006	Limón y Sal	Album of the Year	Nominated
2006	"Me Voy"	Record of the Year	Nominated
2006	Limón y Sal	Best Alternative Music Album	Won
2006	"Me Voy"	Best Short Form Music Video	Nominated
2008	"El presente"	Record of the Year	Nominated
2008	"El presente"	Song of the Year	Nominated
2008	MTV Unplugged	Best Alternative Music Album	Won
2008	MTV Unplugged	Best Long Form Music Video	Won
2010	"Bien o Mal"	Best Short Form Music Video	Won
2013	Los Momentos	Best Contemporary Pop Vocal Album	Nominated
2015	"Ese Camino"	Record of the Year	Nominated
2015	"Ese Camino"	Song of the Year	Nominated
2016	Algo Sucede	Album of the Year	Nominated
2016	Algo Sucede	Best Pop/Rock Album	Won
2022	"Lo Siento BB:/"	Best Reggaeton Performance	Won
2022	"Lo Siento BB:/"	Best Urban Song	Nominated
2024	Herself	Leading Ladies of Entertainment	Won

=== Other awards ===
- MTV Video Music Awards Latin America 2004:

- Best Solo Artist
- Best Artist (Mexico)
- Artist of the Year

- Premios Oye! 2004

- Best Song of The Year (Andar Conmigo)
- Album of The Year (Sí)
- Rock in Spanish

- MTV Video Music Awards Latin America 2006:

- Best Solo Artist

- MTV Video Music Awards Latin America 2007:

- Best Pop Artist

== Bibliography ==
- Blanc, Enrique (2007). De mis Pasos. Conversaciones con Julieta Venegas. Ediciones y Publicaciones Autor. ISBN 978-84-8048-724-5.

== See also ==
- List of best-selling Latin music artists
