= List of radio stations in the Americas =

This is a list of radio stations in the Americas.

== Argentina ==
- CNN Radio Argentina - 950 AM Buenos Aires
- FM La Boca - 90.1 FM Buenos Aires
- FM Federal - 99.5 FM Buenos Aires
- Radio Nacional de Argentina - 870 AM Buenos Aires
  - R. Nacional Clasica
  - R. Nacional Folclorica
  - R. Nacional Rock
  - RAE - Radiodifusion Argentina al Exterior - Shortwave
- Radio 10 - 710 AM Buenos Aires
- Radio ASPEN - 102.3 FM Buenos Aires
- Radio Belgrano – 950 AM Buenos Aires
- Radio Continental - 590 AM Buenos Aires
- Radio Jai - 96.3 FM Buenos Aires
- Radio Rivadavia - 630 AM Buenos Aires
- Radio Rock & Pop - 95.9 FM Buenos Aires
- Radio Mitre - 790 AM Buenos Aires
- Radio La 100 - 99.9 Buenos Aires
- Radio Disney - 94.3 Buenos Aires
- Radio Pop - 101.5 Buenos Aires
- Radio 40 Principales - 105.5 Buenos Aires

== Bolivia ==
=== Beni Department ===
- Radio San Miguel - 99.1 FM & 4700 SW Riberalta
- Radio Santa Ana del Yacuma - 4451 kHz

=== Chuqisaca Department ===
- Radio Camargo - 100,1 FM Camargo
- Radio Encuentro - 96.1 FM & 920 AM Sucre
- Radio Sucre - 1320 AM Sucre

=== Cochabamba Department ===
- Radio Clasica - 100.3 FM Cochabamba
- Radio Estrella - 93.1 FM Cochabamba
- Radio Kawchasun Coca - 99.1 FM Cochabamba / 91.5 FM Valle Alto
- Radio Maria - 106.5 FM La Paz / 101.9 FM Cochabamba / 95.9 FM Yapacani / 97.5 FM Santa Cruz
- Radio Mega - 89.9 FM Cochabamba
- Radio Mosoj Chaski - 3310 SW Cochabamba (Quechua Language Christian Radio)
- Radio El Sonido de Vida - 24.7 FM Comunicación con Vida (emisora cristiana) Cochabamba

=== La Paz Department ===
- Radio Black Rabbit (Blues, Blues-Rock)
- Doble 8 Radio - 88.5 FM La Paz
- Erbol FM - 100.9 FM La Paz
- FM Bolivia - 101.3 FM (94.9?) Chulumani
- Majestad FM - 105.7 FM La Paz (Christian Radio)
- Radio Bendita Trinidad - 1540 AM El Alto / 1480 AM
- Radio Chacaltaya - 93.7 FM La Paz (Cumbia & Popular Music)
- Radio Cruz del Sur - 95.3 FM & 720 AM La Paz
- Radio El Sonido de la Vida - 89.3 FM La Paz (Christian Radio)
- Radio Estelar - 92.5 FM La Paz
- Radio Fides - 101.3 FM & 6155 SW La Paz
- Radio Jallalla Coca - 100.1 FM & 680 AM Chulumani
- Radio Metropolitana - 940 AM La Paz
- Radio Mundial - 97.7 FM La Paz
- Radio Nueva Estrella - 98.7 FM La Paz
- Radio Pachamama - 106.0 FM El Alto
- Radio Panamericana - 96.1 FM, 580 AM & 6105 SW La Paz
- Radio Pasion Boliviana - 107.3 FM La Paz (Bolivian Music)
- Radio Patria Nueva - 94.3 FM, 1020 AM & 6025 SW La Paz (National Public Radio with National Coverage)
- Radio Play - 107.5 FM & 800 AM La Paz
- Radio Poder de Dios - 93.1 FM (90.1 FM?) La Paz
- Radio Qhana - 105.3 FM La Paz
- Radio Kawsachun Coca - 98.8 FM La Paz
- Radio RKM - 90.9 FM La Paz
- Radio Splendid - 1220 AM La Paz
- Radio Uchumachi - 103.7 FM Coroico
- Radio Yungas - 92.1 FM & 730 AM Chulumani

=== Oruro Department ===
- Radio Caliente 97.5 FM Oruro (Tropical Music)
- Radio Pio XII - 99.7 FM Oruro / 97.9 FM Cochabamba / 710 AM & 5952 SW Siglo Veinte (Broadcasts also in Quechua & Aymara Languages)
- WKM Radio 91.3 FM Oruro
- Radio Transamericana FM Oruro, Bolivia.]

=== Potosi Department ===
- Radio Kollasuyo - 105.1 FM & 960 AM Potosi
- Radio Yura - 4717 SW Yura

=== Santa Cruz Department ===
- Classica FM - 106.9 FM Santa Cruz de la Sierra (Adult Contemporary Music)
- Radio Activa - 91.9 FM Santa Cruz de la Sierra
- Radio Atlantica - 88.9 FM Santa Cruz de la Sierra
- Radio Betania - 93.7 FM Santa Cruz
- Radio Disney Bolivia - 98.7 FM Santa Cruz, 102.5 FM La Paz & 107.5 FM Cochabamba
- Radio Integración - 90.3 FM Montero, Sta Cruz.
- Radio Omega - 99.9 FM Montero, Sta Cruz.
- Radio Manantial - 99.7 FM Santa Cruz de la Sierra (Christian Radio)
- Radio Santa Cruz - 6135 AM Santa Cruz de la Sierra

=== Tarija Department ===
- Horizonte FM - 94.9 FM Tarija
- Radio Guadalquivir - 91.5 FM &1420 AM Tarija
- Radio Libertad - 96.7 FM Tarija (Folklore Music)
- Radio Luis de Fuentes - 93.1 FM Tarija

== Brazil ==
=== Current radio stations ===
- 88 FM - 88.7 FM - Rio de Janeiro - Religious
- 89 FM – 89.1 FM – São Paulo - Rock
- 101 FM - 101.1 FM - Rio de Janeiro - Gospel
- Alpha FM – 101.7 FM – Osasco, São Paulo - Adult contemporary and Musica popular brasileira
- Antena 1 - 103.7 FM - Rio de Janeiro - Adult contemporary
- BandNews FM – FM – BandNews radio station – all-news – across Brazil
- Boa Vista FM – 96.5 FM – Paracatu, Minas Gerais
- CBN – News Station – 24 affiliates throughout Brazil (a parent station of Globo, created in 1991)
  - Rio de Janeiro – 860 AM and 92.5 FM
  - São Paulo – 780 AM and 90.5 FM
- Cidade do Aço - 103.3 FM - Rio de Janeiro - Pop
- Clube Cidade – 94.1 FM – Porto Velho, Rondônia
- Costa Verde - 91.7 FM - Rio de Janeiro - Variety
- Cultura – AM and 103.3 FM – São Paulo - Classical
- Eldorado – 700 AM and 92.9 FM – São Paulo - Jazz, MPB, classic rock
- Energia 97 FM - 97.7 FM – São Paulo
- Transamérica – 100.1 FM – São Paulo, also broadcasts throughout Brazil
- JK
- Rádio Jovem FM 98.7 MHz – Itajubá, Minas Gerais
- Jovem Pan – (Largest Latin American radio network with more than 100 affiliates).
- Jovem Pan FM – (Leader in audience in Brazil, present in more than 54 Brazilian cities, the station belonging to Jovem Pan network)
- Jovem Pan FM – 100.9 FM – São Paulo (Broadcaster that leads the Jovem Pan network)
- Kiss FM – 102.1 FM – São Paulo - Classic rock
- Metropolitana FM – 98.5 FM – São Paulo
- Mix (Rádio) – 106.3 FM – São Paulo
- Mix 93.7 FM – João Pessoa
- Morena FM 98.7 FM ] – Itabuna
- Nativa FM – Alegrete, Rio Grande do Sul
- Nova Brasilia
- Numero 1 FM – Salvador, Bahia
- Piatã FM – 94.3 FM – pop – Salvador, Bahia
- Radio 105 – across Brazil
- Rádio Bandeirantes, – AM and FM – Bandeirantes radio station – news, sports and entertainment
- Rádio Caxias – Caixas do Sul, Rio Grande do Sul
- Rádio Capital – Brasília, Federal District
- Rádio Colombo
- Rádio Cultural
- Rádio Energia – FM
- Rádio Fênix – Online radio (radio dedicated to the Japanese population in Brazil)
- Rádio FM 98.6?
- Rádio Globo, 98.1 FM – Globo's radio station – Variety – Rio de Janeiro
- Rádio Inconfidência – pop, sports – Belo Horizonte, Minas Gerais
- Rádio Internacional de Caixas? – Caixas do Sul, Rio Grande do Sul
- Rádio MEC, AM and FM – public's radio station – Music – across Brazil
- Rádio Nacional, AM and FM – public's radio station – Generalist – across Brazil
- Radio Noturno – 93.3 FM – Frutal, Minas Gerais
- Rádio Prudente – Presidente Prudente, São Paulo
- Rádio Record – 77.1 FM – Record's radio station – Variety – São Paulo
- Rádio Renascença – Cajuru?, São Paulo
- Rádio Rio de Janeiro
- Rádio Rondônia – Polim, Rondônia
- Radio Roquette Pinto – 94.1 FM - Rio de Janeiro
- Super Radio Brasilia – 88.9 FM & 1210 AM Brasília
- Super Rádio Tupi – 1280 AM – Rio de Janeiro
- Top FM – 104.1 FM Guarulhos, SP
- USP FM – 93.7 FM São Paulo

== Chile ==
=== Main Commercial Networks ===
- 13 Radios
  - 13C FM
  - Play FM
  - Sonar FM
  - Tele 13 Radio
- Bio Bio Comunicaciones
  - Radio Bio Bio
  - Punto 7 Radio
  - Radio El Carbon
- Compañia Chilena de Comunicaciones
  - Radio Cooperativa
- El Mercurio S.A.P
  - Radio Universo
  - Digital FM
  - Positiva FM
- Mega Media
  - FM Tiempo
  - Radio Infinita
  - Romántica FM
  - Radio Carolina
  - Radio Candela
  - Radio Disney
- Grupo Dial
  - Duna FM
  - Paula FM
- Empresas UC
  - Radio Beethoven
- Iberoamericana Radio Chile
  - ADN Radio Chile
  - Corazón FM
  - FM Dos
  - Los 40 Principales (Chile)
  - Radioactiva (Chile)
  - Radio Concierto
  - Radio Futuro
  - Radio Imagina
  - Radio Pudahuel
  - Radio Uno (Chile)
  - Rock & Pop (Chile)

=== Independent Radio Stations with national coverage ===
- CNN Chile Radio
- El Conquistador FM
- Radio Agricultura
- Radio Armonia
- Radio Carnaval
- Radio Maria (Chile)
- Radio Nuevo Mundo

=== Locales ===
- Radio Festiva Copiapo
- Radio Austral (Chile) (AM) (Valdivia)
- Radio San Bartolome – Regional coverage in the Coquimbo Region (FM)

== Colombia ==
=== Main commercial networks ===
- Caracol Radio
  - W Radio
  - Radioacktiva
  - Tropicana Estéreo
  - Bésame Radio
  - Los 40 Colombia
- RCN Radio
  - La Mega
  - La FM
  - Radio Uno
  - Rumba Estéreo
  - El Sol
  - Amor Estéreo
  - Radio Fantástica
  - Fiesta
  - Antena 2
  - La Cariñosa
- Caracol Televisión
  - Blu Radio
  - La Kalle
- Organización Radial Olimpica
  - Olimpica Stereo
  - Mix
  - Radio Tiempo
  - La Reina
  - Emisora Atlántico
- Todelar
  - La X
- Cadena Súper
  - SuperEstación – 88.9 – Rock
- Radiopolis
  - Candela Estéreo
  - Vibra FM

=== Non-commercial ===
- Radiodifusora Nacional de Colombia (RTVC) 95.9
  - Radiónica (website) 99.1
- UN Radio (Colombia) (National University of Colombia) – 98.5 – Jazz, Classical, News, Pop, Rock, World Music, Colombian Traditional, Salsa, Vallenato
- Javeriana Estéreo (Pontificia Universidad Javeriana) – 91.9 – Jazz, Classical, Pop, Rock, World Music, Colombian Traditional, Salsa, Vallenato

== Ecuador ==
- Radio Publica de Ecuador – 100.9 FM Pichincha (National Radio)
- CRE Satelital – 560 AM Quito
- HCJB La Voz de los Andes – 690 AM, 6.05 SW, 89.3 FM Pichincha (Christian Radio)
- Radio Quito – 760 AM Quito
- Radio Sucre – 700 AM Guayaquil
- Radio Vision – 91.7 FM Quito / 107.7 FM Guayaquil
- Radio EnergiaFm – www.energiafm.com.ec

== Falkland Islands ==
- Falkland Islands Radio Service
- KTV Radio Nova
- BFBS Radio
- BBC World Service

== Honduras ==
Main radio stations:

- Musiquera (93.3 FM San Pedro Sula; 105.3 FM Tegucigalpa) National coverage.
- Radioactiva (99.7 FM San Pedro Sula; 91.1 FM Danlí)
- Estéreo Clase (92.9 FM San Pedro Sula; 92.9 FM Puerto Cortés)
- Radio Nacional de Honduras (101.3 FM Tegucigalpa; 880 AM Santa Rosa de Copán) Public.
- Radio País (106.5 FM Tegucigalpa)
- Radio Globo (88.5 FM Tegucigalpa; 104.5 San Pedro Sula) National coverage.

== Mexico ==
Lists by state:

- List of radio stations in Aguascalientes
- List of radio stations in Baja California
- List of radio stations in Baja California Sur
- List of radio stations in Campeche
- List of radio stations in Chiapas
- List of radio stations in Chihuahua
- List of radio stations in Coahuila
- List of radio stations in Colima
- List of radio stations in Durango
- List of radio stations in Jalisco
- List of radio stations in Mexico City (Note: Mexico City is a federal entity, but not formally a state.)
- List of radio stations in the State of Mexico
- List of radio stations in Morelos
- List of radio stations in Nayarit
- List of radio stations in Nuevo León
- List of radio stations in Puebla
- List of radio stations in Querétaro
- List of radio stations in Quintana Roo
- List of radio stations in San Luis Potosí
- List of radio stations in Sinaloa
- List of radio stations in Sonora
- List of radio stations in Tabasco
- List of radio stations in Tamaulipas
- List of radio stations in Tlaxcala
- List of radio stations in Veracruz
- List of radio stations in Yucatán
- List of radio stations in Zacatecas

== Peru ==
- Radio Nacional del Peru – 850 AM & 103.9 FM Lima (National Coverage)
- Filarmonía 102,7 (Classic)
- La Kalle 95,5
- La Karibeña 94,9 – FM Lima (Cumbia & Tropical Music)
- Nueva Q 107,1 – [National Coverage] (Cumbia Music)
- Onda Cero 98,1 – 98.1 FM Lima + National Coverage (Cumbia Music)
- Oxígeno – 102.1 FM Lima + National Coverage (1980s' Pop)
- Panamericana Radio – 101.1 FM Lima + National Coverage
- Radio Antena Sur – 90.3 FM Huancayo (Andean Folk Music)
- Radio Capital – 1470 AM & 96.7 FM Lima + National Coverage
- Radio Doble Nueve – 99.1 FM Lima (Rock)
- Radio Felicidad
- Radio Huanta 2000 – 1160 AM, 4.747 MHz, & 92.9 FM Huanta
- Radio Logos – 4.81 SW Chazuta
- Radio Mágica – 88.3 FM Lima (1960s' & 1970s' Music)
- Radio María 580 AM & 97.7 FM + National Coverage (Website)
- Radio Ondas del Huallaga – 1350 AM, 3.33 SW, & 88.9 FM Huanuco
- Radio Planeta – 107.7 FM Lima, 95.1 FM Arequipa & 90.9 FM Asia (English Pop Music)
- Radio San Borja – 91.1 FM Lima
- Radio Tarma – 1510 AM, 4.775 SW, & 99.3 FM Tarma
- Radio Vision – 4.79 SW Chiclayo
- Ritmo Romántica (Romantic)
- RPP – 730 AM, & 89.3 FM Lima + National Coverage (Website)
- Sol – Frecuencia Primera RTVN (Internet Radio Station)
- Viva FM – 104.7 FM (2004-2015) 91.9 FM (2015-2016; 2020) Lima (now Internet Radio Station) (Teen Pop)

== South Georgia and the South Sandwich Islands ==
- Radio South Georgia and South Sandwich Islands
- BBC World Service
- Falkland Islands Radio Service

== Suriname ==
- RadioApintie – FM 97.1, FM 91.7

== United States ==
As of June 30, 2026, the FCC had licensed 4,300 AM stations, 6,560 commercial FM stations, 4,806 educational FM stations, 8,846 FM translators and boosters, and 2,013 low power FM stations.

- Lists of radio stations in the United States
- Sortable list of sports radio stations in the United States
- List of jazz radio stations in the United States

== Uruguay ==
- Radiodifusion Nacional Uruguay
  - Radio Uruguay – 1050 AM
  - Emisora del Sur – 1290 AM/94.7 FM
  - Babel FM – 97.1 FM
  - Radio Clasica – 650 AM

== Venezuela ==
- Radio Nacional de Venezuela
  - RNV Canal Informativo
  - RNV Juvenil (Activa)
  - RNV Canal Clasico
  - RNV Canal Musical
  - RNV Canal Indigena
  - RNV Radio Local:
    - RNV Portuguesa
    - RNV Los Llanos
    - RNV Region Central
    - RNV Zulia
    - RNV Anzoategui

== See also ==
- Lists of radio stations in Africa
- Lists of radio stations in Asia
- Lists of radio stations in Europe
- Lists of radio stations in Oceania
