= Rock & Pop =

Rock & Pop may refer to:

- Rock & Pop (Chilean radio), a Chilean radio station from 1992
- Canal 2 Rock & Pop, a Chilean television channel 1995-1999; See Carmen Luz Parot
