= Radio Concierto =

Radio station in Chile

- Santiago, Chile; Chile
- Broadcast area: Territory national of Chile
- Frequencies: 88.5 MHz (Santiago); 88.1 MHz (Arica); 96.3 MHz (Iquique); 90.7 MHz (Antofagasta); 102.5 MHz (Copiapó); 90.1 MHz (La Serena/Coquimbo); 93.1 MHz (Gran Valparaíso); 98.1 MHz (Pucón); 102.3 MHz (Valdivia); 92.7 MHz (Punta Arenas); Canal 659 VTR (All Chile)

Programming
- Format: Rock, Pop, Indie, Alternative of 70's, 80's, 90's, 2000's and present

Ownership
- Owner: Ibero Americana Radio Chile
- Sister stations: Radio Futuro, Radio Activa, Rock & Pop, Radio Uno, ADN Radio Chile, Radio Imagina, FM Dos, Los 40, Radio Pudahuel, Corazón FM

History
- First air date: August 1, 1972 (first stage, 101.7 MHz); December 2000 (Second stage, 88.5 MHz)

Technical information
- Class: ABC1, C2

Links
- Webcast: Listen Live
- Website: concierto.cl

Concierto (in English: Concert Radio) is a Chilean radio station located at 88.5 MHz of the FM dial in Santiago de Chile. Also it transmits for all the country with its network of repeaters and by the channel 659 (with D-Box) of the cable operator VTR, 973 in the cable operators GTD and Telefónica del Sur and via internet in the rest of the country and the world.

== Direction ==
In its first stage it was directed under Julián García-Reyes and Juan Enrique Amenábar. From the arrival of the radio to IARC and until 2005, its director was: Javier Sanfeliú. Since January 2013 to May 2021, its director was: Sergio Cancino. Since June 2021 to December 2025, its director was Juan Cristóbal Vera.

== Broadcasters and program leaders ==
During their four stages, several voices have passed through their microphones. These include: Corporate speakers and voices

Former

- Julián García-Reyes
- Eleodoro Achondo
- John Gress
- Gabriel Salas Arévalo
- Lalo Mir
- Luis Muñoz
- Eduardo Riveros Behnke
- Fernando Solís
- Blanca Lewin
- Carolina Urrejola
- José "Pepe" Lavat
- Macarena Fernández

Actuales

- Daniel Maldonado Amaro
- Omar González
- Natalia del Campo

Program Managers

Former

- Alfredo Lewin
- Sergio Fortuño
- Cristián Warnken
- Augusto Góngora
- Boris Orellana
- Patricio Urzúa
- Blanca Lewin
- Natalia del Campo
- Katyna Huberman
- Cecilia Amenábar
- Fernando Paulsen
- Polo Ramírez
- Rafael Cavada
- Claudio Fariña
- Santiago Pavlovic
- Pablo Márquez
- Carolina Pulido
- Verónica Calabi
- Fernando Lasalvia
- Eduardo Kuthe
- Patricio Miñano
- María José Prieto
- Mirna Schindler
- Andrea Hoffmann
- Cristina González
- Javiera Contador
- Ignacia Allamand
- Macarena Fernández
- Mariana Derderián
- Patricia Venegas
- Álvaro Paci
- Davor Gjuranovic
- Christian Barreau
- Claudia Álamo
- Sergio Cancino
- Elisa Zulueta
- Paloma Moreno
- Consuelo Solar
- Constanza Santa María
- Andrés Vial
- Trinidad Barros
- Bárbara Alcántara
- Piedad Vergara
- Patricio Bauerle
- Felipe Gerdtzen
- Pamela Le Roy
- Claudia Salas
- Álvaro Castilla
- Darío Córdova
- Juanita Ringeling
- Marco Silva
- Lorena Bosch
- Natalia Freire

Current

- Francisca Jorquera
- Jorge Zabaleta
- María Elena Dressel
- Iván Guerrero
- Catalina Muñoz
- Fernanda Schorr
- Roberto Camhi
- Sofía Antequera
- Amaro Gómez-Pablos
- Daniela Silva Rodighiero

== Programs ==
- Concierto Valor
- Zoom Concierto
- Catálogo Concierto (Catalogue Concert)
- La Comunidad Contrataca
- Tierra de Unicornios
- Sonido Circular (only Tuesday)
- Clima de Cambio (only Saturday)
- Fibra Emprendedora (only Saturday)

=== Past programs ===
- Super 45
- Autocontrol
- La Maquinita
- Caipirinha
- Sandía
- Café Blank
- Objetos Encontrados
- Concierto Enfoque
- Gran Reserva
- Noches Concierto
- Dingo Domingo
- Club Radical
- Box Set Concierto
- Concierto Discoteque
- Ñam en Concierto
- La Personal
- En Vivo y en Concierto
- Casetera Concierto
- Mañana será otro dia
- Artistas Invitados
- Concierto Placer
- La Comunidad Sin Anillo
- Destino Final
- Concierto Sabor
- Nada es tan grave
- Green News

== Slogans ==
Period	Slogan
1972-1995	Gran Concierto de amistad, por el camino de la paz (Great Concert of friendship, on the road to peace).
1995-1996	Radio Concierto, el desembarco de los ángeles (Concert Radio, the landing of the angels).
1998-1999	Rock y guitarras. Primera en tu memoria (Rock and guitars. First in your memory).
2000-2007	La radio de hoy (Today's radio).
2007-2008	Presente en tu memoria (Present in your memory).
2008-2014	La voz de los '80 (The voice of the '80s).
2014–present	Solo grandes canciones (Just great songs).
