= Beatriz Sánchez (journalist) =

Chilean journalist and politician

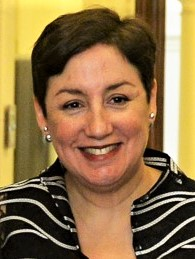

Member of the Senate
- Incumbent
- Assumed office 11 March 2026
- Constituency: Maule Region

Ambassador of Chile to Mexico
- In office 9 November 2022 – 10 July 2025
- President: Gabriel Boric
- Preceded by: Domingo Arteaga
- Succeeded by: Julio Bravo

Member of the Constitutional Convention
- In office 4 July 2021 – 4 July 2022
- Constituency: 12th District

Personal details
- Born: 24 December 1970 (age 55) Viña del Mar, Chile
- Party: Broad Front (2024–present)
- Spouse: Pablo Aravena
- Children: 3
- Education: University of Concepción
- Profession: Journalist

Beatriz de Jesús Sánchez Muñoz (born 24 December 1970) is a Chilean journalist and politician. She also served as Chilean ambassador to Mexico.

During the 1990s and 2000s, she worked as a political and current affairs journalist for radio stations in Chile, where she achieved high recognition for her activity. During the 2010s, she joined television, where she was the host of the Hora 20 news program on La Red.

In 2017, she ran for her country's presidential candidacy in the Broad Front primaries, achieving 68% of the preferences. In the same year, she ran as a candidate for the Broad Front in the 2017 presidential elections, where she reached third place, with a percentage higher than 20%, only two percentage points lower than her contender, Alejandro Guillier.

Sánchez has obtained multiple awards for her work as a journalist. In 2014, she received the distinction as the "best television journalist of the year" by the Adolfo Ibáñez University. In 2016 she obtained the Raquel Correa Award by the National Association of Women Journalists of Chile.

== Family and education ==
She studied at Saint Paul College in Viña del Mar, a private Christian-Anglican institution. The daughter of two university academics, she traveled to Great Britain during her school years while her father pursued postgraduate studies. Later, she studied journalism at the University of Concepción.

She has been married for 28 years to Pablo Aravena, whom she met at university, with whom she has 3 children: Diego, Sebastián, and Pablo; The first of them she had at the age of 19, while she was in her second year of journalism, and she has stated that at that time she considered performing an abortion, but finally decided to have that child.

== Career ==
=== Radio ===
Much of her career has been developed in the radio world, being a journalist for various programs on Radio Bío-Bío (1994-1996), Radio Chilena (1996-2002), Radio Cooperativa (2003-2007), ADN Radio (2008- 2014) and Radio La Clave (2014-2017).

She was a founding figure of ADN Radio, where she served as anchor host along with other journalists. There she began to make her editorials, which were not without controversy, due to the leading role she took on the station, different from the traditional space that women have been given in Chilean communications. In 2014, she resigned from ADN Radio after a conflict with a union leader, following the path of several of her colleagues, including Fernando Paulsen.

Her last work in the media was on Radio La Clave, where she hosted the program Combinación Clave. In editorials, she analyzed various current issues, such as corruption, gender inequality and the quality of democracy in Chile.

=== Television ===
She began her television career after turning 40, in the newscast Hora 25 from La Red, along with Verónica Franco, which was the first program to have a female duo in the conduction. In this regard, she declared "that the classic 'pairs' of men and women in the news are reproduced only out of habit".

Also on La Red, she developed the program Entrevista Verdadera between 2015 and 2016. Her time on television ended abruptly; In mid-2015, the Hora 20 program was taken off the air due to the closure of La Red's press department. In February 2017, La Red did not continue its contract, leaving its program off-screen, which she described as a "painful exit" for leaving people with whom she had generated a close relationship.

== Presidential Candidacy ==
The journalist was contacted in January 2017 by the Cittizen Power party to propose a pre-candidacy for the Broad Front for the presidential election that year, which she ruled out in a message on her Twitter account on 13 January. However, after a meeting with the Democratic Revolution party and the Autonomist Movement, she decided to consider an eventual pre-candidacy, freezing her work at Radio La Clave and postponing other projects she was planning: to carry out a diploma and a Goldsmith course. This decision was made public on 21 March.

During her presidential campaign, Beatriz Sánchez presented her presidential program called "The program of a lot", whose 202 pages relate in detail the bills and government plans, should she become president. Among its proposals was the creation of a new Political Constitution, the consolidation of a plurinational state, political and economic decentralization, reduction of the salary of parliamentarians, undersecretaries and ministers, establishment of plebiscites and popular votes, among others.

On 3 April, she formalized her candidacy for the Broad Front primaries in an act held in the Plaza Baquedano, in Santiago. Sánchez won the Broad Front primaries in the 2 July elections, with 68% of the votes.

== Ideology ==
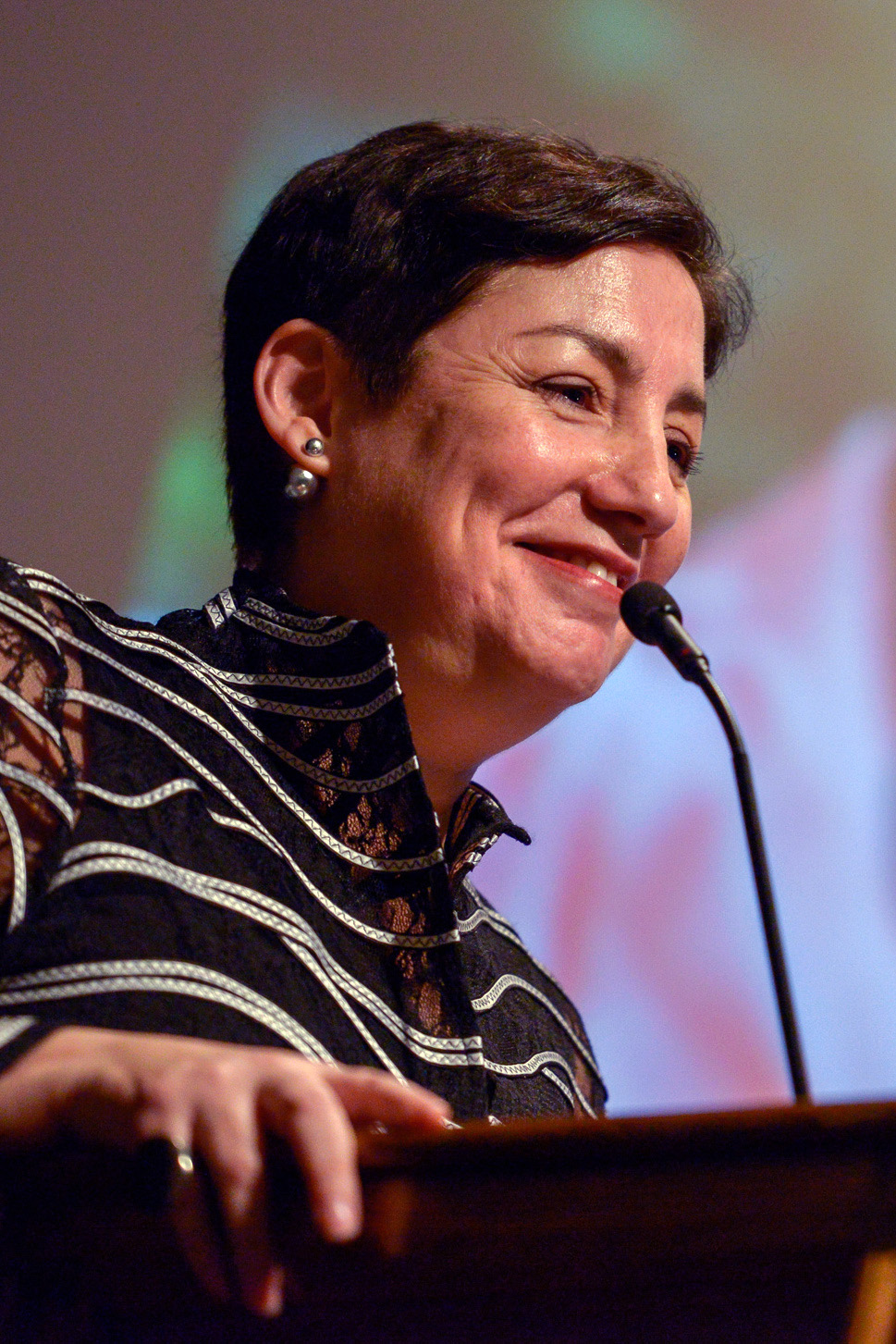
Sánchez receiving the Raquel Correa prize in 2016.

=== Feminism ===
Beatriz Sánchez is a self-declared feminist. In an interview with Paula magazine in November 2014, she stated that her reasons for such are that “we still earn up to 40% less than men for the same job; Despite being 50% of the population in the country, we are less than 20% in political positions, in company directories, in national awards and general management; and it's not because all women want to be mothers".

=== Political position ===
On 10 June 2020, Sánchez accused Secretary of State Jaime Mañalich of having an "erratic" strategy to handle the coronavirus pandemic in Chile. On 12 June 2020, Sánchez, along with the parliamentarians Carmen Frei, Carmen Hertz, and Maya Fernández Allende, signed a public letter, questioning the deficient sanitary control that the second government of Sebastián Piñera has had during the health crisis, and demanded the immediate resignation of the Minister of Health, Jaime Mañalich.

== Awards ==
- Best television journalist Year 2014, by the Adolfo Ibáñez University.
- 2016's Raquel Correa Award, by the Association of Female Journalists in Chile.

== See also ==
- List of female Chilean presidential candidates
