= Carmen Luz Parot =

Chilean journalist and documentary filmmaker

- Born: Carmen Luz Parot Alonso; 1967 (age 58–59)
- Occupations: Journalist, filmmaker

Carmen Luz Parot Alonso (born 1967) is a Chilean journalist and documentary filmmaker.

== Biography ==
Parot graduated as a journalist from the Pontifical Catholic University of Chile and studied photography with Héctor Ríos. She began her career working in various media, such as the newspaper La Época and the television channels Canal 2 Rock & Pop and Canal 13. On the Rock & Pop channel, she was editor of the program Plaza Italia. She also worked with the musical group Inti-Illimani, making reports and music videos.

The idea to create her first documentary, Víctor Jara: El derecho de vivir en paz, arose while doing a journalistic investigation on the Chilean singer tortured and murdered during the military dictatorship. In the film the director used as much archival material – interviews and concerts of Jara – as later interviews with the singer's relatives and friends. Later she premiered the documentary Estadio Nacional, that shows how the eponymous stadium was used as a detention center during the military dictatorship.

Parot also documented the reunion tour of the rock group Los Prisioneros, which gave rise to the DVD Lo estamos pasando muy bien, which has behind-the-scenes content, as well as showing songs played at the concerts.

On the occasion of the reform of the Copyright law of Chile, the director criticized some of its provisions, especially those that affected the work of documentarists. According to Parot, the exception for using works protected by copyright for informational purposes allowed the media to use parts of her documentaries without financial compensation, despite the fact that the media themselves charge for the incorporation of their materials into her films.

In 2015 the documentary television series Chile en llamas premiered on Chilevisión. Comprising seven episodes and presented by Humberto Sichel, the series shows some cases of censorship that occurred in the country.

== Filmography ==
- 1999 – Víctor Jara: El derecho de vivir en paz
- 2003 – Estadio Nacional
