= ADN Radio =

Radio station in Chile

Programming
- Format: Adult contemporary, news/talk

Ownership
- Owner: Ibero Americana Radio Chile
- Sister stations: Radio Activa, Rock & Pop, Radio Futuro, Radio Concierto, Radio Uno, Radio Imagina, FM Dos, Los 40, Radio Pudahuel, Corazón FM

History
- First air date: March 1, 2008

Links
- Webcast: Listen Live
- Website: adnradio.cl

ADN (In English: DNA) (acronym: Actualidad, Deportes, Noticias, in English: News, Sports, News) is a Chilean radio station that broadcasts on 91.7 MHz FM in Santiago, Chile. ADN transmits across the entire country on channel 669 (with D-Box) of the cable operator VTR and via the internet worldwide. The station's voiceover is Fernando Solís Lara.

The station's signal reaches nearly all the national territory through 34 frequencies and is the only radio news network that transmits on the Easter Island.

The station combines contemporary adult music, news, sports, and current events, which makes it popular among a younger audience. Its target listeners are between the ages of 25 and 45.

ADN prides themselves on journalistic integrity, made possible by contributors Mauricio Hofmann, Mirna Schindler, Andrea Aristegui, Antonio Quinteros, Iván Núñez, Eduardo Fuentes Silva, Andrea Hoffmann, Sandra Zeballos, Carlos Costas, Francisco Mouat, Juan Cristóbal Guarello, Victor Cruces, Rodrigo Hernandez, Cristián Arcos and Danilo Díaz.

== History ==
The station began broadcasting on March 1, 2008. The station was named "ADN Radio Chile" in 2015, as a replacement for Radio W Chile, which had similar programming.

The first interview of ADN Radio Chile was broadcast on the program ADN Hoy. The interview was conducted on March 1, 2008 by Alejandro Guillier who interviewed the former President of Chile, Michelle Bachelet.

== Notable presenters ==
=== Current ===
- Iván Núñez
- Mauricio Hofmann
- Mirna Schindler
- Eduardo Fuentes
- José Antonio Neme
- Sandra Zeballos

=== Former ===
- Alejandro Guillier
- Fernando Paulsen
- Matías del Río
- Alejandra "Jani" Dueñas

== Frequencies ==
- 91.7 MHz (Santiago)
- 95.3 MHz (Arica)
- 103.1 MHz (Iquique)
- 91.1 MHz (Calama)
- 88.9 MHz (Antofagasta)
- 101.7 MHz (Copiapó)
- 89.5 MHz (La Serena/Coquimbo)
- 98.9 MHz (Tongoy)
- 98.1 MHz (Ovalle)
- 96.9 MHz (Los Andes/San Felipe)
- 88.3 MHz (Isla de Pascua)
- 94.1 MHz (Gran Valparaíso)
- 91.5 MHz (San Antonio)
- 103.7 MHz (Rancagua)
- 97.7 MHz (Curicó)
- 93.5 MHz (Talca)
- 90.1 MHz (Constitución)
- 91.3 MHz (Linares)
- 89.3 MHz (Parral)
- 98.3 MHz (Cauquenes)
- 101.3 MHz (Chillán/Pinto)
- 104.1 MHz (Concepción)
- 104.9 MHz (Los Ángeles)
- 92.1 MHz (Temuco/Nueva Imperial)
- 97.1 MHz (Villarrica)
- 102.3 MHz (Pucón)
- 104.1 MHz (Valdivia)
- 92.3 MHz (Osorno)
- 88.5 MHz (Puerto Varas)
- 88.1 MHz (Puerto Montt)
- 106.5 MHz (Ancud)
- 104.3 MHz (Castro)
- 105.1 MHz (Coyhaique)
- 93.5 MHz (Punta Arenas)
- Canal 669 VTR (All Chile)
