= Arelis Uribe =

Chilean journalist, writer, and communication expert

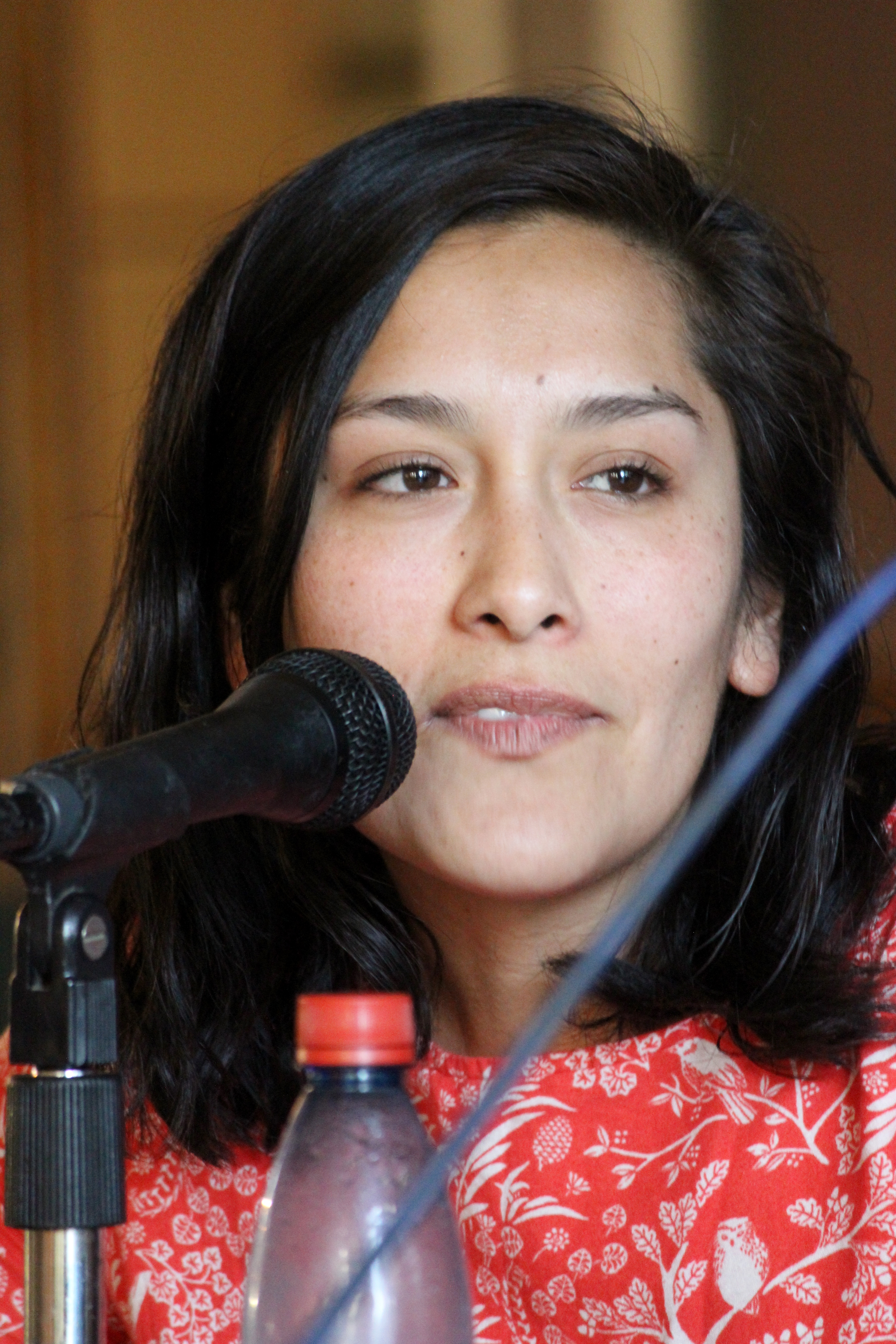
Arelis Uribe in 2018

Daniela Arelis Uribe Caro, better known as Arelis Uribe (born Santiago de Chile, 1987), is a Chilean author. She worked for the presidential campaign of Beatriz Sánchez in the 2017 national election. As a writer, she is best known for her debut collection of short stories Quiltras. In 2016 she won the Santiago en 100 palabras Award for her story "Lionel".
