= Radio Pudahuel =

Radio station in Chile

- Santiago, Chile; Chile
- Broadcast area: Nationwide
- Frequencies: 90.5 MHz (Santiago); 91.5 MHz (Arica); 103.7 MHz (Iquique); 95.3 MHz (Calama); 95.9 MHz (Antofagasta); 89.3 MHz (Copiapó); 99.9 MHz (La Serena/Coquimbo); 92.7 MHz (Ovalle); 90.1 MHz (San Felipe/Los Andes); 105.7 MHz (Gran Valparaíso); 94.7 MHz (San Antonio); 91.7 MHz (Rancagua); 90.3 MHz (Talca); 88.9 MHz (Linares); 103.9 MHz (Chillán); 99.9 MHz (Gran Concepción); 90.3 MHz (Los Ángeles); 90.3 MHz (Temuco/Nueva Imperial); 89.7 MHz (Villarrica); 92.5 MHz (Valdivia); 91.9 MHz (Osorno); 95.5 MHz (Puerto Montt); 93.7 MHz (Ancud); 106.5 MHz (Coyhaique); 98.3 MHz (Punta Arenas)

Programming
- Format: Latin music

Ownership
- Owner: Ibero Americana Radio Chile (PRISA)
- Sister stations: Radio Futuro, Radio Activa, Rock & Pop, Radio Uno, ADN Radio Chile, Radio Concierto, Radio Imagina, FM Dos, Los 40, Corazón FM

History
- First air date: October 15, 1968

Links
- Webcast: Listen Live
- Website: pudahuel.cl

Pudahuel is a Chilean radio station located at 90.5 MHz of the FM dial in Santiago de Chile. It also transmits to the rest of the country with its network of repeaters, and via internet for the rest of the world.

His institutional voice is that of Balmores Fajardo.

== History ==
Radio Pudahuel began broadcasting on October 15, 1968, under the wing of the society Blaya and Vega, composed by Joaquin Blaya Barrios and Ricardo Vega, also the radio was under the partnership of Blaya and Campo Limitada composed by Joaquin Blaya Barrios and Pedro del Campo Benavente. Its name derives from the commune where were its first studies and that had just changed its name. In 1970 he moved to the center of Santiago, to Miraflores 130.

It is one of the oldest Modulated Frequency Radios in Chile, and since its inception it has been 90.5 FM in Santiago de Chile, as well as the long and extensive network of stations throughout the country that it has acquired over time.

In its beginnings, the radio was popular cut and news, without marking a clear style. It was only in 1979, when the radio moved to Las Condes, which was adopted an Anglo-pop style, which was maintained until 1985, when he turned to a Latin style after Pablo Aguilera's arrival to the station, which earned him For a long time the first place of audience, according to Ipsos surveys of the time, especially between the late 80s and mid 90s, being great competition for the now defunct Radio Aurora (today Radio Imagina). Thus were created the slogans like La radio de Chile, El sonido de Chile or La primera en tu corazón, con toda razón.

At the end of the 1980s, its expansion began throughout the country. The first cities to expand were Valparaíso in 107.7 FM (today 105.7 FM) and then the city of Curicó in 93.9 FM. Since 1993 it has achieved national coverage, becoming the radio with the country's first satellite network. Note that none of the Santiago radios had a satellite network in those years that covered the whole country, only some capital stations had stations of their own, while others came to regions only by associated radios.

Today Radio Pudahuel has a program directed especially to middle-class women. Currently, according to the latest measurement of Ipsos, Pudahuel is among the 5 most-heard stations in Santiago, a situation that is repeated in much of the country. In 1999 the company Blaya y Vega - owner of Pudahuel and administrator of the frequency 89.3 FM of Santiago, belonging to the Pontificia Universidad Católica de Chile - is acquired by Ibero Americana Radio Chile.

== Broadcaster ==
Current:

- Balmores Fajardo
- Juan La Rivera
- Angélica Guerrero
- Pablo Aguilera
- María Fernanda "Titi" García Huidobro
- Claudia Sáez
- Alejandro Chávez
- Daniela Aguilera
- Pato Cisternas "El Hacedor de Hambre""

Former:

- Christian Gordon
- Luis Alejandro Rojas
- Luis Jara (1997)
- Esperanza Silva (2000–2003)
- Rafael Araneda (2000–2002)
- Bárbara Rebolledo (2000–2001)
- Patricio Frez (1990–2006)
- Renata Bravo (2002–2007)
- Francisco López (2003)
- Catalina Droguett (2004–2006)
- Carolina Julio
- Carlos Bencini
- Cristián Pérez
- Ignacio Gutiérrez
- Leo Caprile (2007–2011)
- Catalina Telias (2008)
- Martín Cárcamo (2009)
- Sergio "Pirincho" Cárcamo (1992–1999)
- Rodriguinho (2009–2011)

== Slogans ==
- Pudahuel, la Superstereo (1968–1972)
- Es superior (1973–1976)
- El sonido joven (1977–1980)
- Su Radio Amorosa (1981–1984)
- La primera en tu corazón... Con toda razón (1985–1992)
- El sonido de Chile (1993–2000)
- Pudahuel...uniendo Chile desde Arica a Punta Arenas..es más música
- Primera red satelital de Chile (1996–2000)
- La radio de Chile (2000–present)
- Pudahuel es mi radio (2003)
- Pudahuel te escucha, escucha Pudahuel (2006-presente)
