= Telecanal =

Chilean television channel (2005–2026)

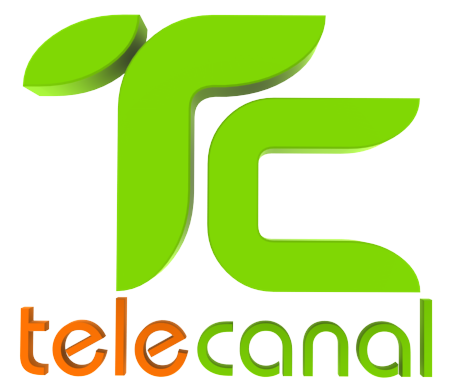
- Country: Chile

Programming
- Language: Spanish
- Picture format: 1080i (HDTV)

Ownership
- Owner: Canal Dos, S.A. (Albavisión) (its ownership was given to Guillermo Cañedo White, and is controlled by Wayland Services Group Limited, headquartered in the British Virgin Islands)
- Sister channels: La Red

History
- Launched: December 5, 2005; 20 years ago (original); June 9, 2026; 5 months ago (relaunch on cable)
- Replaced: Canal 2 Rock & Pop (1995-1999); Vidavisión (1999–2005)
- Closed: May 14, 2026; 6 months ago (broadcast license revoked on May 12, 2026, original)

Availability

Terrestrial
- Digital UHF: Listings may vary

Telecanal's former logo, used since 2008 until October 2011

Telecanal is a Chilean privately owned TV channel, launched on Monday, December 5, 2005, six years and four days after the end of the transmissions of Canal 2, whose broadcast hours required by law were covered by slots paid for by the evangelical ministry VidaVisión. Its offices and studios are located in the Sanhattan neighborhood of Las Condes and is owned by Canal Dos, S.A., a company with connections to Albavisión, owners of La Red. On May 4, 2026, the CNTV unanimously declared the total expiry of Canal Dos S.A.’s digital broadcasting concessions, citing repeated and serious breaches of technical, administrative, and legal requirements. In its last 2 days on air from May 12, Telecanal operated as a pirate television station without a valid broadcasting license.

At its launch, Telecanal offered alternative programming for the local industry. However, during its first years of broadcasting it left behind its original offer, reducing its in-house programs and limiting itself to broadcasting foreign programming. Much of the output has already been broadcast by La Red since both channels belong to the Albavisión group; therefore, both are the only broadcast television channels in Chile that have the same owner, even though national legislation and regulatory entities have blocked this ownership situation in other similar cases, including the one that led to the bankruptcy of the previous owner of the channel 2 frequency in 1999.

Its biggest competitors are its sister channel La Red and TV+, being the three channels with the lowest audience reception in the country. It currently airs in Santiago on VHF channel 2, and digital terrestrial television since 2021.

Since the early morning of June 16, 2025, Telecanal has ceded almost its entire broadcast schedule to the foreign channel Russia Today in Spanish, as Canal Dos S.A. signed an agreement with the Mexican company Unimedios. Through this agreement, it rebroadcasts up to 23.5 hours of RT content daily, limiting its own programming to only brief half-hour segments each day. The contract stipulates that Unimedios assumes responsibility for the content, indemnifies Canal Dos against any potential penalties, and can manage the RT rebroadcast without administrative access to the television slots, at least formally.

However, the CNTV considers that these events could constitute a de facto transfer of control and use of the television signal to a third party, which is prohibited by Article 16 of Law 18.838. It is noted that Canal Dos would be relinquishing its autonomy and individuality as a concessionaire, essentially acting as a repeater of foreign programming.

On February 5, 2026, the National Television Council of Chile announced the maximum administrative sanction for retransmitting and completely changing its programming to that of the Russian channel RT, this sanction consists of the suspension of broadcasting for 7 days, having a working period of 5 days, until February 12, to carry out the above indicated. Despite the above, Telecanal did not comply with the suspension, and continued broadcasting continuously, even after the deadline for the interruption of broadcasting had expired. The arrangement Telecanal had with Unimedios ended prematurely after it accepted a CNTV decision to suspend the channel from midnight on April 18 for the period of one week.

Finally, on April 17, 2026, it was announced that the agreement with Unimedios for the retransmission of RT would be terminated early, and it would also comply with the CNTV sanction of suspending its broadcasts for one week, which took place at midnight on April 18 of the same year.

On Tuesday, June 9, 2026, Telecanal relaunched, broadcasting packaged content and infomercials from Antena 3 Directo (A3D), but only on cable television, on the cable operators VTR, Claro and Movistar, from which the channel was already previously available., However, as of July 22, the signal went black, and days later it was displaying color bars due to the loss of the image from the Amazonas 4a satellite service.

== History ==
=== Background ===
Originally, channel 2 in Santiago was used by the high-power repeater station of Televisión Nacional de Chile operating from Cerro El Roble (border between the Metropolitan Region and the Valparaíso Region) to relay its signal to other localities. This had to be technically modified to give frequencies to the broadcasts of a new channel in Santiago.

The eventual winner became Compañía Chilena de Comunicaciones, who, by associating itself with Estudio Visión (as CCC had no resources to produce content for television), began Canal 2 Rock & Pop, based on the existing radio station of the same name. However, the channel started facing a series of financial crises and lack of ratings, as well as the sale of the license in 1998 to Canal 2, S.A., which in 1999, began broadcasting VidaVisión, an evangelical channel, during daytime hours. On the early hours of December 1, 1999, Rock & Pop's programming on the station closed, facing moments of tension between employees and staff, and a replacement service (Canal 2) took over with a minimal eight-hour schedule and slots from the VidaVisión network.

VidaVisión was an evangelical channel created by Christian media professionals led by Alejandro Martínez (born Santiago in 1965 and became a born-again Christian in 1984), who created two local Christian stations, Gospel TV (first Christian television station in Chile), RTV (La Roka TV) and a kids channel on VTR, Rainbow Club (first Chilean kids channel, later renamed The Fun Channel). Around early 2001, VidaVisión rented over 100 hours per month on Canal 2's frequencies.

In August 2001, the station was renting from 5pm to midnight. Alejandro Martínez said that the station was "not an evangelical channel" but a general profile station. Due to its beliefs, it had to omit the promotion of gambling from its programming. It initially did not aim to have a newscast in a first phase, but would offer one by 2002. The channel also aired safe, violent-free cartoons and planned a children's program similar to Cachureos but avoiding all acts of violence. There were also programs dedicated to the evangelical music scene, and Grupo Cooperativa went to the United States on purpose to obtain know-how from Christian television stations there. VidaVisión started to rent studios from Edu Comunicaciones (now Televisión Interactiva), who at the time controlled Vía X, Zona Latina, and ARTV to remain on the air for at least 8 hours per day by law to avoid forfeiture of its signal. As a result, religious programming ended up coping with the full extent of daily transmissions.

On February 17, 2004, VidaVisión lost its studios at Alameda 2520 under the grounds that it lacked the technical conditions to operate as a television station. Work evaluated at CL$100 million to continue operating from its extant facilities was made, but its staff was unaware that its operations were on the verge of closing. As consequence, the staff had to start producing its programming from the streets.

=== Launch (2005–2010) ===
In July 2005, Compañía Chilena de Comunicaciones, the owner of the frequency, announced that it would sell the channel 2 concession to Inversiones Alfa Tres SA, led by Jaime Cuadrado (former commercial manager of Canal 13 and personal friend of Don Francisco) for CLP 2.7 million. The VidaVisión programming had left Canal 2's signal and was replaced by color bars.

The sale became final in September of that year. That same month, Telecanal began its test phase, in which it only aired corporate promotions for the channel, as well as revealing the channel's logo and slogan for eight hours a day (especially overnight), to comply with the Chilean regulations. In that video, the faces of the channel and the planned programming were revealed, which was different than the one that was planned. On October 27, Alfa Tres acquired the frequencies formerly used by the Telenorte network which operated between Arica and La Serena.

The channel began its official broadcasts on Monday, December 5, 2005, but only on terrestrial television. Negotiations with VTR were underway in order to enable the channel to be seen by its subscriber base of 750,000. Its broadcasts through cable television began on January 1, 2006, through the networks of VTR and on January 10 on Coltrahue TV, in June, the channel began broadcasting on satellite through Telefónica TV Digital and in December through Gtd, on 23 March 2010, it reached Claro TV's cable network.

Initially, the channel had small live slots of no more than 30 minutes in length, while the bulk of its programming was based on foreign series, cartoons (Telemonitos), films, and telenovelas, mainly from Mexico, Colombia, and Argentina. Launch titles included Soy Gitano, La Mentira and Privilegio de amar. Its limited local programming consisted of Casi a las 12 (women's interest program), Canal abierto (discussion program) and a youth co-production called NFK2 (pronounced "enfocados") presented by Paloma Aliaga and Daniel Valenzuela. The Telemonitos strand included foreign animated series such as Sinbad, Sitting Ducks and Timon and Pumbaa, interspersed by local studio segments with Lidia Gutiérrez. With just one year on air, new programs came to light such as the sports program Como en la radio, the magazine Cocinados, and the talk show Canal Abierto. Among their main faces were Daniel Valenzuela, Carolina Correa, Milton Millas, and Carla Ballero.

It was the most technologically advanced television station in Chile at the time of its launch. Jaime Cuadrado was appointed as its director in order to avoid La Red from controlling the station, which was a violation of CNTV laws. The channel did, however, gain access to La Red's back catalog of imported series. A similar arrangement existed between La Red and Canal 13, in which Canal 13 acquired titles and it and La Red shared revenues. The scheme used to set up its operations was similar to the planned buying of Red Global in Peru.

In mid-October 2008, as a result of the worldwide financial crisis, the television company decided to remove a large part of its national programming, which was mostly carried out by external producers, leaving its most emblematic program "Cocinados" on the screen, together with Conspiración Copano, Hiperconectados, Pago x ver, Pura noche and Mundo Motor. Its newscast, En Línea, was transferred to 11pm with a half-hour edition, while the films that occupied the primetime slots in "Cine de Estrellas", were moved to 8pm.

2009 started with the return of Pura Noche but with Alfredo Alonso as its host, who joins the station, as well as Krishna Navas, who later would have her talk show with female themes ("Only them"), along with Pamela Díaz, Liliana Ross and Matilda Svensson. "Jugados" and "Actualidad central" were also created.

As of April 2009, the network's reach increased its coverage towards the Chilean Antarctic.

On 16 November 2009, the station's first late show debuted, "Influencia Humana" (with Jorge Castro de la Barra), which incorporated Pablo Zúñiga into the channel. The slot was well received by the public, and key national personalities were interviewed, such as presenters Felipe Camiroaga and Vivi Kreutzberger.

=== Early 2010s ===
In early January 2010, Telecanal dispatched a journalist, Sergio Molleda, for Anatel's presidential debate. A few days after the debate, the news service "En Línea" stopped broadcasting. In late February, "Influencia Humana" was canceled and weeks later, the same thing happened with "Only They", and again, the programming focused on canned foreign content.

In September 2010 it began to build a sports area for the transmission of the UEFA Europa League, replacing La Red that broadcast it in the previous season, and Monday through Friday at midnight Hello sports, covering other disciplines issued other than football, like basketball, volleyball and rugby.

In November of that same year, businessman Jaime Cuadrado, then owner of the sign, closed an agreement to sell Telecanal the Mexican, a former executive of Grupo Televisa and former director of Mega Guillermo Canedo White.

In 2011, Telecanal broadcast the UEFA European Under-21 Championship, which was held in Denmark, for the first time on Chilean over-the-air television.

In June–July 2012, Telecanal aired that year's European Championships, held in Poland and Ukraine, shared with Chilevisión. The live broadcast of the match between England and Ukraine on June 19 caused at least five Twitter trending topics and had better ratings than Chilevisión, who preferred to use the airtime to air content for women (La Jueza and Maid in Manhattan) and air the match on delay.

=== Mid 2010s ===
In 2013, Telecanal ended with an annual rating of 0.43 rating points, even being surpassed by UCV (which reached 1.3 annual viewing points), the channel less seen in Chilean television. The poor results are explained only because of lack of live programming and excess of imported content packaged.

In December 2013 a new slot of Mexican telenovelas opened at 21:00, with the premiere of A Family Lucky. With this decision, Telecanal decided to take NCIS, which is issued only on weekends.

Since 1 January 2014, José Manuel Larraín assumed the new executive director of the station.

During May of that year, every Saturday the "Specials of Telecanal" transmitted the national series Picaflor Effect.

Since January, Telecanal began broadcasting "A3D" infomercials from Monday to Sunday, occupying the block from 8 a.m. to 1 p.m. Following the departure of its programs "A las 11" and "Teletiempo", Telecanal is dedicated only to its "Entertainers" program.

=== ADN TV ===
At the beginning of March 2016, national media reported on the project being developed for an open news television channel under the name of the informative radio signal of Ibero Americana Radio Chile - a subsidiary of the Spanish multimedia conglomerate Prisa -, in conjunction with Telecanal and La Red. To the first, I would rent 12 hours of airtime; to the second, a studio and physical, technical and human resources in its television center in Quilín. The channel would operate under the threshold of the company Multimedios GLP, controlled by the radio consortium and Albavisión, which then served only as a joint-venture for the sale of advertising in the media that both companies operated in the country.

The new channel would have information as its stronghold, with central and current newscasts; in addition to spaces for investigative journalism, interviews, and some for entertainment and culture, all independent of ADN Radio's radio programming, which would not see its programming modified. It would be editorially led by Gerson del Río, and the anchor news conduction would be in charge of Mauricio Hofmann and Mirna Schindler; Its executive director would be the person who held the same position at La Red, Javier Urrutia. Despite this, Telecanal would not disappear completely, since it would transmit the remaining 12 hours (until noon) giving way to ADN TV broadcasts from that hour onwards.

It was made public that, thanks to its alliance with La Red, the new channel would own the rights to broadcast Chilean soccer goals, and given the presence of Telecanal on pay TV, ADN TV would be available on most of the operators. .

ADN TV debuted on 10 June 2016 with the broadcast of Euro 2016 by the radio's sports team: Víctor Cruces or Ignacio Salcedo hosting; stories by Alberto Jesús López "El Trovador del Gol", Patricio Barrera "El Grillo del Gol" and Manuel "Manolo" Fernández; and comments by Danilo Díaz and Sergio Vargas. The matches significantly improved Telecanal's audience, which hovered between 0 and 1 point, finally consolidating by achieving a historic index with peaks of 16 points and an average of 13 points on July 10, during the final match between France and Portugal, surpassing all the competition, even the leading channel of the moment, Mega.

In addition, it broadcast the Chile - Colombia series on 16 and 17 July in the American Zone of the 2016 Davis Cup, again in charge of the channel's sports team, thus achieving a peak of 4 audience points, surpassing at certain times to Channel 13 that showed a weekly summary of the Turkish television series Selin.

The ADN TV project was canceled without further explanation in December 2016.

=== High-definition signal and entrance to digital terrestrial television ===
The channel began transmitting in high definition in 2016 through channel 7 of the cable operator Coltrahue Digital of Santa Cruz, stretching its 4:3 signal to this format. On 6 September of that year, Telecanal carried out a broadcast test in 16:9 aspect and 720p resolution – unlike the rest of the Chilean open channels, which broadcast in 1080i – through the Amazonas 4A satellite that covers all of South America. South; Along with the HD signal, a 4:3 SD signal was added and the "1seg" that is used for reception on mobile devices.

It was not until 28 September 2021 that Telecanal officially began broadcasting on TVD through virtual channel 2.1, on the UHF 31 multiplex in Santiago. That same month, the channel began broadcasting the competitions of WWE Raw and SmackDown, after its previous stint on La Red. It also broadcasts International Boxing.

In September 2023, the National Television Council began the administrative sanctioning procedure against Canal Dos S.A, the channel's operating company, due to non-compliance for not starting broadcasts on open digital television of the Telecanal signal in the cities of: Arica (11.1 - 26 UHF), Iquique (12.1 - 41 UHF), Antofagasta (4.1 - 21 UHF), Chuquicamata (8.1 - 23 UHF), Copiapó (5.1 - 41 UHF), San Pedro de Atacama (12.1 - 26 UHF), La Serena and Coquimbo (5.1 - 35 UHF), San José de Maipo (2.1 - 21 UHF), Panguipulli (4.1 - 32 UHF) and Los Muermos (12.1 - 26 UHF).

On 1 November 2023, it arrived to Copiapó on TVD, (5.1 - 41 UHF), being the first region to receive the digital signal from Santiago.

In the first three months of 2025 alone, the channel obtained an operational increase of CL$621,2 million, reversing its 2024 losses of nearly CL$2 billion.

=== Relaying RT en Español ===
On 16 June 2025, Telecanal started relaying RT en Español permanently, although the channel is still obliged to continue airing CNTV-mandated cultural programming (airing El Conciertazo and Reino Animal) and electoral campaigns. The RT en Español website also mentioned its coverage on channel 2.1.

On June 17, UDI representatives Natalia Romero and Gustavo Benavente sent a letter to regulator CNTV showing their concern for the RT relays, as well as its ban in European countries at the onset of the Russian invasion of Ukraine in 2022 and possible ideological issues. Additionally, there is a lack of publicly-accessible information concerning the relays, especially with Telecanal being an Anatel member. The letter also suggests that RT does not respect the Chilean laws regarding journalistic independence. The Russian Embassy in Chile defended its stance under supposed claims of "diversity of expression and opinions", and being comparable to networks such as the BBC, France TV, Deutsche Welle, ABC, NHK, CBC and others. An investigation by Radio Bio-Bio noted that the network was investing US$3 million in expanding the terrestrial relays of its Spanish-language channel in Chile, Argentina and Costa Rica, while Chilean legislators criticized its presence for infringing the law.

On June 18, 2025, the National Television Council convened in an extraordinary session citing Telecanal's director Rodrigo Álvarez to provide more transparency about the details of the contract with RT, while Subtel required information about the channel's license. CNTV said that foreign broadcasts on over-the-air television must be subject to editorial criteria from the licensing station, and that content from a country at war like Russia could lead to debates On the status of pluralism and democracy.

The National Television Council convened on June 30, 2025, with one of the topics being the Telecanal affair. The council applied two sanctions for the channel regarding two documentaries that violated CNTV guidelines. Both documentaries were related to the Russian invasion of Ukraine: El acento Nazi del Ejército Ucraniano (about Russia's claims that the Ukrainian army during the war had elements of Nazism, which CNTV considered to be partial) and Sin margen de error. Both documentaries also featured high-risk footage of soldiers during the war. Telecanal could face the risk of being sanctioned due to the lack of transparent information about the terms of its lease.

In practice, the only non-RT programming consisted of cultural content, the broadcast of which is mandatory to comply with the regulations of the National Television Council (CNTV). This included Reino Animal, a foreign children's program focused on the animal world; El Conciertazo, a program originally produced by Televisión Española (TVE) featuring symphonic music for children; and Caminando Chile, a program previously broadcast on La Red, which focused on showcasing different parts of the country and its history.

The channel broadcast the 2025 Teletón campaign by broadcasting an exclusive program for digital platforms called "Digitón". This participation was exceptional, as Telecanal did not participate in the official television broadcast of the event for the first time since 2006, in a context marked by its resignation from the National Television Association (Anatel) and the controversies arising from the rebroadcast by RT en Español.

Subsequently, on January 23, 2026, Telecanal also unofficially joined the special program called "Unidos por Ñuble y Biobío", organized by Anatel, and broadcast by associated channels such as La Red, TV+, TVN, Mega, Chilevisión and Canal 13. The special focused on providing aid to the people affected by the forest fires that occurred in the Ñuble and Biobío regions, even though its participation in that special event was not initially planned.

And on March 11, 2026, it also joined in a national broadcast for the change of command, held at the National Congress in Valparaíso, in which José Antonio Kast assumed the position of President of the Republic from that date until March 11, 2030.

=== Political and civil society reactions ===
Representatives of the Independent Democratic Union (UDI) — of the right-wing coalition Chile Vamos — and the Republican Party (far right) They expressed their rejection, arguing that RT is a propaganda outlet for the Kremlin, and its presence on Chilean free-to-air television represents a risk of disinformation and foreign interference. Parliamentarians from both parties even requested that the Chilean National Television Council (CNTV) review whether the rebroadcast complies with current regulations regarding media pluralism and freedom of expression.

On the other hand, figures from the academic and media fields have warned about the lack of transparency in the agreement between Telecanal and RT, pointing out that citizens have the right to know the terms of the agreement, especially if it is a channel financed by a foreign government.

Human rights organizations have expressed concern about the possible dissemination of content that downplays international conflicts or human rights violations committed by the Russian government led by Vladimir Putin. From the left, former mayor of Recoleta and former presidential candidate Daniel Jadue Communist Party of Chile criticized in a column in El Ciudadano the reactions to the rebroadcast of the RT channel on Chilean open television, calling them "hysterical" and coming from both the right and the center, pointing out that the real fear lies not in Russia, but in the possibility that the ideological control of the dominant discourse in the national media will be fractured.

Following the switch, the CNTV has observed an increase in complaints against Telecanal regarding the editorial line of the new content broadcast by RT, particularly concerning an alleged lack of balance in the coverage of topics related to the war in Ukraine, the role of NATO, and relations between Russia and Latin America. The Russian Embassy in Chile celebrated the channel's arrival, arguing that it offers Chileans "a different perspective" and narrative universes comparable to media outlets such as the BBC, France TV, or Deutsche Welle; el embajador ruso en Chile, Vladimir G. Belinsky, declaró a Radio Bío-Bío que se enteró del arribo de RT “como muchos chilenos”, y negó cualquier intervención de la embajada en su llegada. The Russian ambassador to Chile, Vladimir G. Belinsky, told Radio Bío-Bío that he learned of RT's arrival "like many Chileans," and denied any embassy involvement in their arrival.

On the other hand, the Ukrainian ambassador to Chile, Yurii Diudin, expressed his concern in a letter published in El Mercurio regarding RT's rebroadcast on Telecanal, warning that the channel operates as a Kremlin propaganda tool, spreading disinformation and justifying Russian military aggression, particularly in the context of the war in Ukraine. He also called for reflection on the compatibility of this type of content with Chile's democratic values and warned of the dangers of information manipulation in hybrid warfare scenarios.

=== Reactions from the CNTV and complaint from Canal 13 ===
In response to the public outcry, on June 20, 2025, the National Television Council (CNTV) issued a statement reminding everyone that it does not exercise prior censorship, but does exercise subsequent oversight, and that the broadcasting of foreign content is not prohibited as long as it complies with Chilean legislation and editorial responsibility is guaranteed.

In an extraordinary session, the CNTV requested information from the Undersecretariat of Telecommunications regarding Telecanal's current concessions and summoned its executive director, Rodrigo Álvarez Aravena — a lawyer and partner in the Chilean office of DLA Piper.– to explain the agreement with RT. He also noted that he had received citizen complaints and parliamentary letters, pledging to act in accordance with the law and to safeguard pluralism and democracy.

By the end of June 2025, Canal 13 He filed a formal complaint with the CNTV accusing Telecanal of illegally ceding its signal to RT, marking the first time in the history of Chilean television that one network has directly denounced another for alleged violation of the law. Canal 13's complaint argues that Telecanal replaced almost all of its regular programming with content produced by the Russian government in Moscow, without national intervention or authorization from the CNTV; this, in the channel's opinion, seriously violates Chilean laws on television concessions, editorial responsibility and national ownership of the signals, which would represent a structural transfer—and not a "temporary agreement"—that violates article 16 of Law No. 18,838 on television concessions. The complaint also highlights that RT is currently sanctioned by the European Union, which considers it a propaganda tool of the Moscow Kremlin. Furthermore, Canal 13 alleges that Telecanal changed its editorial line without notice, while maintaining minimum airtime stipulated by law, such as the broadcast of the election campaign. 2025 Chilean presidential primaries; At the time of the complaint, the program had already ceased broadcasting after the end of the campaign period. The station, owned by the Luksic Group, also warns that this practice jeopardizes media sovereignty and the institutional integrity of the Chilean television system, and urges the CNTV to act urgently, filing charges and imposing exemplary sanctions.

==== Disciplinary proceedings against Telecanal by the National Television Council ====
Chile's National Television Council (CNTV) initiated administrative sanction proceedings in mid-August 2025 against Canal Dos S.A., the concessionaire of Telecanal, due to multiple legal and technical infractions detected during 2025. This action stems from a series of serious breaches of the regulations governing digital television in the country, as documented in the records reviewed by the authority. The situation calls into question Telecanal's compliance with its obligations as a concessionaire and raises doubts about the continuation of its license, given that the irregularities could compromise the principles of autonomy and pluralism in television media.

According to the Chilean public broadcaster, Telecanal airs up to 23.5 hours of RT content daily, relegating its own programming to a mere 30 minutes per day. This contract, which absolves Telecanal of responsibility for the content and allows Unimedios to manage the retransmission, has led the CNTV to conclude that the channel is effectively ceding control of its signal to a third party, a practice prohibited by Article 16 of Law 18.838. This situation suggests that Telecanal is primarily acting as a repeater of foreign programming, compromising its autonomy as a broadcaster.

In addition to programming irregularities, the CNTV and the Chilean Undersecretariat of Telecommunications have identified significant technical failures. Telecanal has not achieved the minimum digital coverage required by Law 20.750 in several of its concessions, especially on secondary signals which, in many cases, only broadcast colored bars without actual content. Discrepancies in transmitter power have also been detected in cities such as Arica, Iquique, Antofagasta, and Copiapó, as well as the misuse of the retransmission rights granted in Chuquicamata. These non-compliance issues, which affect concessions in multiple locations, include the delayed commencement of services and non-compliance with technical standards, further aggravating the channel's situation.

Another point that aggravates the situation is an indemnity clause. The contract stipulates that Unimedios assumes full responsibility for the content broadcast and is liable for any fines or sanctions imposed by the CNTV (National Television Council). For the council, this is conclusive proof that Telecanal is effectively relinquishing its responsibility as a concessionaire, surrendering its autonomy and individuality in a way that is expressly prohibited by law.

The situation of Canal Dos S.A. illustrates the regulatory challenges in the transition to digital television in Chile and the importance of compliance with regulations to safeguard the autonomy, pluralism, and proper functioning of the television media system.

Later, around that time, Telecanal decided to withdraw from its active participation in ANATEL due to the conflict generated by the rebroadcast of the Russian channel RT, although it remains affiliated with the association. As a result, the channel did not participate in the broadcast of the presidential debate on November 10, corresponding to the first round, although it did air the required political advertising slots, which are mandated by law.

On November 21, it was reported that Telecanal accumulated $5.5 million in fines for violating Law 18.838, which regulates the proper functioning of television and aspects such as the right to information, pluralism, and the broadcast of content unsuitable for minors during public viewing hours. Among the violations were the broadcast, on June 16, of a report depicting the exchange of bodies between the two countries, which was fined 40 UTM (Tax Unit Monthly), and the reports “The Nazi Accent of the Ukrainian Ground Forces” and “No Margin of Error,” each sanctioned with a fine of 20 UTM. Although Telecanal acknowledged the charges, it chose to pay the fines rather than contest them.

On January 26, 2026, Telecanal was sanctioned by the National Television Council over its rebroadcasts of RT en Español, giving it five working days to enable a one-week suspension of its operations, as 96.4% of its schedule consists of live relays of the Russian network. The measure affects the six cities Telecanal where has a license to broadcast.

On February 5, 2026, the National Television Council of Chile announced the maximum administrative sanction for retransmitting and completely changing its programming to that of the Russian channel RT. This sanction consists of a 7-day suspension of broadcasting, with a 5-day period to carry out the aforementioned action. Despite the above, Telecanal has not complied with the suspension, and has continued broadcasting continuously after February 12 (deadline), even after the fatal deadline for interrupting broadcasting had expired. The resolution is not based on the political content of the broadcast signal, but on the non-compliance with article 16, second paragraph, of Law No. 18,838, relating to the prohibition of transferring editorial control of a television concession to third parties. However, on February 16, Telecanal filed an appeal with the Santiago Court of Appeals to challenge the sanction imposed by the CNTV ordering the suspension of its broadcasts for seven days, due to the broadcast of the Russia Today (RT) channel.In its defense, Telecanal maintains that the agreement does not relinquish control of the channel, as it retains full editorial independence and the right to modify or suspend the broadcast of RT en Español at any time. Furthermore, it asserts that broadcasting up to 23.5 hours of RT en Español daily is merely a possibility, not an obligation. The channel also argues that Unimedios does not manage the signal, but only provides content, a common practice in the industry, and accuses the Chilean National Television Council (CNTV) of confusing the transfer of broadcasting rights with the provision of audiovisual material. With this action, Telecanal seeks to suspend the sanction while the court resolves the dispute

After initially failing to comply with the measure and continuing with its regular programming, the CNTV resolved on March 30 to initiate a new sanctioning procedure and refer background information to the Public Ministry for a possible crime contemplated in the General Telecommunications Law, without ruling out even the possible expiration of the concession. The case was described as unprecedented by the agency, as it involved both compliance with licensing regulations and freedom of

Subsequently, on April 17, 2026, Telecanal announced that it would comply with the sanction, suspending its broadcasts between April 18 and 24, 2026. It also announced the early termination of its airtime lease agreement with Unimedios, a company involved in the rebroadcast of RT en Español, and the submission of a compliance plan to the Chilean National Television Council (CNTV) to regularize its situation. This case unfolded alongside international reports accusing Russia of promoting disinformation networks in Latin America, claims that were rejected by Russian authorities and dismissed as "Western propaganda." Finally, on April 25, 2026, at midnight, the channel reverts to its previous identity (+wave +entertainment), going directly to the test pattern after the identifier has been broadcast (since the new programming ends at midnight and begins at 8:30 a.m.).

=== Return of imported programming and infomercials (April–May 2026) ===
At midnight on April 25, 2026, after the seven-day suspension ordered by the Chilean National Television Council (CNTV) expired, Telecanal resumed its former visual identity (+onda, +entretención) and a schedule based primarily on syndicated content and infomercials. From then on, the station's schedule ceased being 24-hour, starting at 8:30 a.m. and ending at midnight.

The new programming dedicated more than 50% of its airtime to Antena 3 Directo (A3D) infomercials. The remaining seven hours of content were structured with animated series such as Bucky in Search of World Zero, Medabots, and Maya the Bee; foreign dramas such as Chapa tu combi, La reina de las carretillas, Séptima puerta, Toledo, cruce de destinos, and Sin retorno; as well as the programs Reino animal and El conciertazo, strategically used to meet the legal quota of four hours of weekly cultural programming required by the CNTV.

This programming schedule model generated questions from media specialists. Luis Breull, consultant and former Director of Oversight at the National Television Council of Chile (CNTV), criticized the station's lack of content, arguing that the channel operated more like a "retail store shelf" than a media outlet, and questioning the concession holder's right to continue using the radio spectrum without contributing to the public's identity or agenda. Meanwhile, despite having registered financial profits at the end of 2025 (a period when the channel broadcast much of RT en Español's programming), the press reported an internal crisis of instability at the channel, marked by delays in paying its employees' salaries after the programming change.

=== End of operations ===
Seventeen days after resuming operations, the National Television Council unanimously declared on May 4 the nullification of the digital licenses of Canal Dos S.A., owner of the network. This is the most severe sanction applied by the regulator and means the definitive closure of the network in its digital format. The company had, as of May 12, 2026, six assigned licenses awarded during the analog to digital migration project, according to Law 20.750; these licenses covered Arica, Iquique, Antofagasta, Chuquicamata, Copiapó, La Serena and Santiago, however it never activated subchannels in the northern regions and did not activate its subchannel in Santiago, although the legal deadlines expired in 2023 in the north and April 2024 in Santiago. The regulator had previously warned the channel, receiving an admonition in 2022 and a UTM 50 (US$3,300) fine in 2024 for the same lack of compliance, by dodging the consequences.

The decision follows the controversial relay of RT en español. CNTV had already sanctioned Telecanal to enable a third-party entity to be in charge of part of its programming, which is forbidden in Chilean law, causing the seven-day suspension. Moreover, the Commission for the Financial Market (CMF) reported that the company did not bring its financial data for the fourth quarter of 2025 on time, another issue CNTV did not follow separately, due to the end of the licenses.

From May 13, CNTV initiated a 30-day deadline to initiate a new public contest and reassign those frequencies to other interested groups which comply with technical and coverage obligations. The radioelectric spectrum is a national good of public use, and CNTV emphasized that "it should be used in an efficient manner for the benefit of the viewers".

That same day, following the notification of the resolution and awareness of the closure, Telecanal continued broadcasting regularly without complying with CNTV regulations, becoming a historical event, the only such thing in Chilean television history, where a national television network continued operating without a license. The May 13 schedule still mentioned the channel identity, owner of the frequency and legal representative in its sign-on and sign-off videos, when, in practice, they no longer existed.

Its last regular day of operations, without the permit to operate, began at 8:30am on May 13, and ended at midnight on May 14, when Telecanal's signal cut to a black screen after its nightly sign-off, ending its 20-year run on air. The final program seen before sign-off was the Spanish series Toledo: Cruce de Destinos.

=== Post closure of Telecanal broadcasts (2026) ===
Following the definitive closure of Telecanal's broadcasts on May 14, 2026, the channel filed an appeal with the Supreme Court on May 18 against the decision of the National Television Council (CNTV), which revoked all its concessions due to non-compliance in digital coverage and the lack of activation of secondary signals.

Telecanal maintained that the sanction was excessive and unprecedented in Chile, arguing that its main channel was indeed operational and that the secondary channels were optional. According to the channel, the CNTV interpreted the regulations arbitrarily to justify the cancellation of its licenses.

Furthermore, the station alleged that the true motive behind the measure was to censor the rebroadcast of the Russian channel RT, content that Telecanal aired for much of 2025 and 2026. In its appeal, it stated that the CNTV deliberately conflated technical problems with editorial questions related to RT, characterizing the decision as an act of censorship and an abuse against a media outlet.

For its part, the CNTV defended the expiration, pointing out that Telecanal had been failing to meet its technical digitization obligations for years, despite previous sanctions such as warnings and fines. It also indicated that several signals granted during the digital transition process were never activated within the legal deadlines.

Two weeks after its closure, Canal Dos appealed to the Supreme Court to overturn the expiration of its digital broadcast licenses decreed by the National Television Council (CNTV). In its legal filing, Telecanal accused the agency of acting as a “censor” by questioning the retransmission of content from the Russian channel RT. In the wake of this event, a number of Albavisión channels aired a nearly three-minute report on the channel's appeal to the courts. The channels involved also preceded the report with the same script.

Several international media outlets linked to the Albavisión conglomerate (to which Telecanal is allegedly affiliated, as is La Red, a Chilean television channel) broadcast reports on the Chilean National Television Council's decision to revoke the channel's digital broadcasting licenses. Channels in various countries, including Peru, Bolivia, Paraguay, Guatemala, Costa Rica, and El Salvador, aired reports with a similar approach and writing style, highlighting the debate on television regulation and freedom in Chile, as well as Telecanal's legal appeal, which deemed the sanction disproportionate. The broadcasts included reports of approximately three minutes explaining the channel's closure after two decades on the air.

=== Telecanal returns to cable TV ===
On Tuesday, June 9, 2026, Telecanal returns to the air once again, broadcasting packaged content and infomercials from Antena 3 Directo (A3D), but only available on cable TV through the cable operators VTR (Chile), Claro (Chile), and Movistar. Thus, Telecanal resumed operations after almost a month off the air, now only waiting to see what its future holds on free-to-air television.

In October 2026, it was revealed that Telecanal had completely vacated its former premises at the World Trade Center Santiago, which housed its administrative offices, studios, and technical room. Footage released by a real estate agency showed the dismantled facilities, with only a few acoustic panels from one of the former studios remaining. Following the channel's departure, the property was offered for lease, specifically targeting audiovisual companies, production houses, and creative or post-production agencies.

== Programming ==
In the early years, Telecanal produced a variety of in-house productions:

- A las 11 (morning show)
- En línea (news)
- Pura noche (call-TV, 2008)
- Telemonitos (kids' block)
- Pago x ver (game show)
- Agenda central (debate)

Original programming was halted in the early 2010s; after the ADN TV experiment in 2016, Chilean programming was limited to Caminando Chile'segments.

== Controversies ==
In July 2005, Compañía Chilena de Comunicaciones (former frequency owner) sold the signal to Alfa Tres. Jaime Cuadrado, owner of Alfa Tres, is the former commercial manager of Canal 13 and a personal friend of Mario Kreuzberger (Don Francisco (television host)). Alejandro Martinez, owner of VidaVisión, initiated a lawsuit against Compañía Chilena de Comunicaciones alleging fraud.

Also, Jaime Cuadrado has ties with Mexican media mogul Remigio Ángel González, owner of Red Televisión. It has even been stated that González is the actual owner of the station. Ownership of more than one television station is forbidden by Chilean law to avoid a horizontal monopoly.

A 2017 report by El Mostrador exposed the illegal operation held by Albavisión at the time of the Panama Papers. La Red, its sister channel, was owned by Global Holding Properties Corporation, registered in the British Virgin Islands. The National Television Council investigated the two licenses regarding an infraction of existing laws. Such investigation could have led to Telecanal's closure, but nothing ultimately happened.

== See also ==
- List of Chilean television channels
- La Red
