= A las 11 =

- Genre: Morning show
- Country of origin: Chile
- Original language: Spanish

Production
- Producer: Gustavo Cariaga
- Running time: 60 minutes (1 hour)

Original release
- Network: Telecanal
- Release: October 1, 2012 – January 2, 2015

A las 11 (11 o' clock) is a Chilean morning television program which aired on Telecanal since October 1, 2012.
