= Musa Awards =

Chilean award for achievements in music

Musa
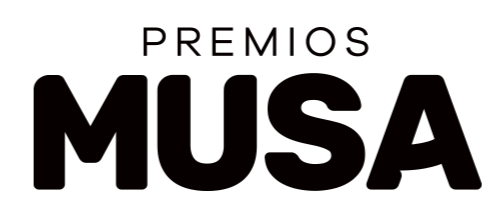
- Awarded for: Outstanding achievements in the music industry
- Country: Chile
- Presented by: Ibero Americana Radio Chile, PRISA
- First award: December 4, 2020; 5 years ago
- Website: premiosmusa.cl

Television/radio coverage
- Network: Ibero Americana Radio Chile (2020-present); TVN (2022-present)

The Musa Awards (Spanish: Premios Musa) are presented by Ibero Americana Radio Chile, a subsidiary of the Spanish group PRISA, to recognize "the best musical releases" in the Chilean music industry.

== History ==
The Musa Awards originated from an initiative led by Ibero Americana Radio Chile and its ten national radio stations. The recognitions were established to honor the "best of Chilean and international music within the year."

The award statuette was designed by Chilean artist Norton Maza, drawing inspiration from the muses of ancient Greek culture.

The first edition took place in 2020, hosted by comedian Felipe Avello and journalist Matilda Svensson.

== Categories ==
As of 2024, the Musa Awards feature fourteen categories, along with a special Lifetime Achievement Award. The categories are:

- Album of the Year
- Song of the Year
- Emerging Artist
- Pop Artist
- Rock Artist
- Urban Artist
- Tropical Artist
- Music Video of the Year
- Latin International Artist of the Year
- Anglo International Artist of the Year
- Latin International Song of the Year
- Anglo International Song of the Year
- Collaboration of the Year
- International Collaboration of the Year
- Lifetime Achievement Award

== Ceremonies ==
Edition	Date	Venue	Hosts	Network	Ref.
1st	December 4, 2020	Televisión Nacional de Chile Auditorium	Felipe Avello; Matilda Svensson	IARC	
2nd	December 2, 2021	Las Condes Municipal Theatre	Felipe Avello; Fernanda Hansen	IARC	
3rd	December 4, 2022	Las Condes Municipal Theatre	Lorena Bosch; Lorena Capetillo; María Luisa Godoy; Eduardo Fuentes	IARC; TVN	
4th	December 7, 2023	Televisión Nacional de Chile Auditorium	Luis Jara; María Luisa Godoy	IARC; TVN	
5th	December 5, 2024	Televisión Nacional de Chile Auditorium	Jean Philippe Cretton	IARC; TVN	
