= Andrea Hoffmann =

Chilean radio and television host

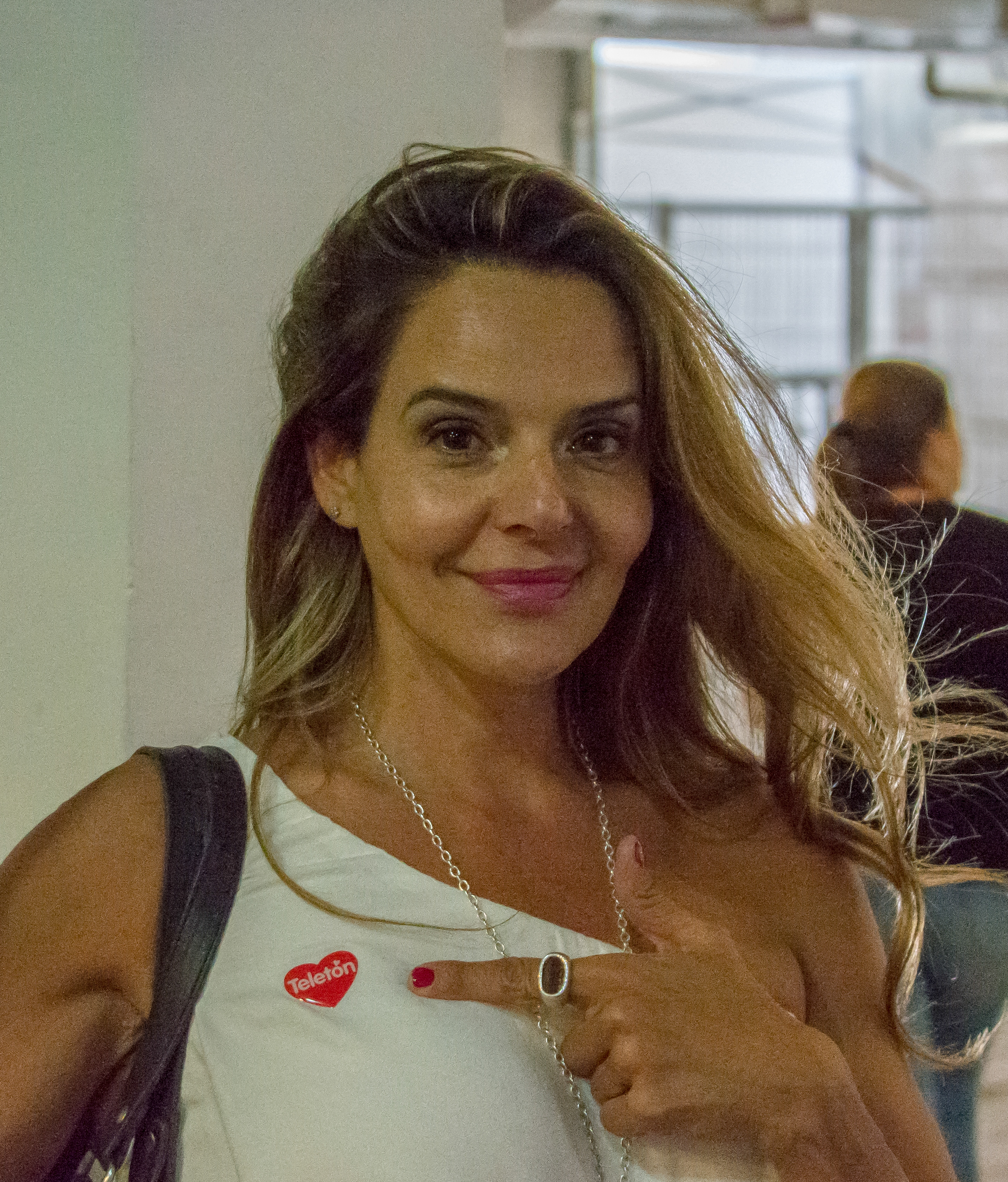
- Hoffmann in 2018
- Born: Andrea Francisca Hoffmann Vega; April 22, 1970 (age 56); Santiago de Chile, Chile
- Education: Saint George's College
- Occupation: Radio host
- Spouse: Arturo Ibaceta Escobar (1998–present)

Andrea Francisca Hoffmann Vega (born April 22, 1970) is a Chilean radio and television host who previously worked as a dancer and choreographer. She was the first host of the show 3×3 on Channel 13. She is currently part of Radio La Clave with the program Clave social.

== Biography ==
After finishing high school at Saint George's College, she pursued a degree in Physical Education at the former Blas-Cañas Institute until she discovered dance. She was part of the Folkloric Ballet of Chile and the National Folkloric Ballet.

Her entry into television came through dance. In Venga conmigo, she was the choreographer for Generación 2000, a group of young people led by Cristián de la Fuente that danced to the hits of the time. She also appeared on Sábado gigante during Vivi Kreutzberger's tenure.

Due to a restructuring of the morning programming on Channel 13, in 2005, she debuted as the host of a new show called 3×3 alongside Eduardo Fuentes and José Miguel Furnaro. Additionally, she presented traffic updates on the show that followed 3x3, En boca de todos with Iván Valenzuela and Carolina Urrejola. She stayed with both programs for four years.

In 2008, she debuted on the radio, hosting La comunidad sin anillo on Radio Concierto, a show that quickly became a favorite during rush hour. Her partnership with Patricio Bauerle was successful, lasting eight years on air.

She also worked on La Red, serving as a panelist on Pollo en Conserva in 2009 and as the host of Mujeres primero in 2010. Additionally, she was a co-host alongside Mario Kreutzberger on Who Wants to Be a Millionaire? on Channel 13.

In 2016, she returned to Channel 13 as a judge on Dancing alongside Neilas Katinas and Jordi Castell. Since 2022, she has hosted the program "Clave Social" on Radio La Clave, alongside journalist María José García, which shares positive news and stories.

After leaving the radio program La comunidad sin anillo, she joined Radio ADN as a morning host alongside Eduardo Fuentes for two years.

In 2022, she participated in the second season of Aquí se baila on Channel 13, becoming the sixth contestant eliminated.

She served as interim host of the show MILF on TV+ from July to December 2022.
