= Boa Vista FM =

Boa Vista FM (ZYC723)
Paracatu, Minas Gerais; Brazil
- Broadcast area: Paracatu
- Frequency: 96.5 MHz

Programming
- Format: pop music, country, love songs

Ownership
- Owner: Grupo Lene; (Lene Radiodifusão Ltda)

History
- First air date: 1984

Technical information
- Licensing authority: ANATEL
- Class: A3
- ERP: 15 kW
- Transmitter coordinates: 17°10′30″S 46°55′17″W

Links
- Public license information: Profile
- Website: boavistafm.com

Boa Vista FM is a radio station broadcasting on 96.5 FM, serving Paracatu, Minas Gerais and parts of western Minas Gerais in Brazil. The station is a mixture of variety, Top 40, pop, country and romance music.
