= Copyright law of Chile =

The copyright law of Chile is governed by Law No. 17,336, on Intellectual Property of October 2 of 1970 and subsequent amendments. It was implemented in the Decree No. 1122 of the Ministry of Education of Chile on May 17 of 1971.

This law aims to protect the economic and moral rights of Chilean authors and foreigners residing in Chile, granted by the mere fact of creating works that are literary, artistic and scientific.

It states that foreign authors who aren't domiciled in the country enjoy the protection that is recognized by the international conventions that Chile has signed and ratified.

== History ==
The Constitution of Chile of 1833 stipulated in Article 152 that "Every author or inventor shall have exclusive ownership of his discovery or production .." resulting in the act Literary and Artistic Property of July 24 of 1834 being passed. It was replaced by Decree Law No. 345, Intellectual Property, of May 5 of 1925. In turn, the 1950 Act 9.549 extended the copyright duration after the death of the author to fifty years.

In 1970, Chile signed and ratified the Berne Convention for the Protection of Literary and Artistic Works which states, among other principles, that the protection of the works should not be conditional upon compliance with any formality requirements.

Before it was due to issue a new law compatible with the international treaty, the Chilean government enacted Law No. 17,336, on Intellectual Property of October 2 of 1970 which, repealed the previous legislation on the subject.

== Types of works ==
Although the law provides a list of protected works, it is not exhaustive.

- Books, pamphlets, articles and writings.
- Conferences, speeches, lectures, reports, reviews, etc., both written or recorded versions
- Dramatic, dramatic-musical and theater in general, pantomimes and choreographic
- Music
- Adaptations of literary or original works, his librettos and screenplays, radio or television productions of literary works
- Newspapers and magazines
- Photographs, engravings and lithographs
- Films
- Projects, sketches and architectural models
- Audio-visual materials relating to any science
- Paintings, drawings, illustrations, etc.
- Sculptures and works of figurative art
- Scenographic sketches and scenes
- Adaptations, translations and other transformations, when authorized by the original author of the work if it is not in the public domain
- Video and slide shows
- Software

== Types of rights ==
The types of rights under Chilean law is divided in two:

- Moral rights consists in the recognition of authorship of the work, being able to oppose any changes, keep the work unpublished, and so on. These rights are inalienable and not transferable, but can be transmitted to the surviving spouse and heirs.
- Property rights consist of the use of the work, whether its publication, reproduction, adaptation, translation or processing performance. These rights can be transferred to third parties after permission of the author or rights holder.

== Duration of protection ==
The protection of copyright in Chile is for the life of the author and 70 years after his death.

Originally, the Law No. 17,336 established an extension of 30 years, which was amended in 1992, increasing that period to 50 years after the death of the author. In turn, this duration was increased again in 2003 by Law No. 19,914, to 70 years.

Article 10 of Law 17,336 provides that if there is a spouse or unmarried daughters or widows whose spouse or affected by an inability to perform any kind of work, this period will extend until the date of death last of the survivors.

== Public domain ==
Law No. 17,336, recognizes the existence of public domain. These works of the common cultural heritage can be used by anyone, provided they mention the authorship of the work and respect the integrity of the work.

Included in this type of work common cultural heritage of the following:

- Works whose term of protection has been extinguished
- Works of unknown authorship, including the songs, legends, dances and expressions of folklore
- Works whose holders waived the protection afforded by this law
- Works of foreign authors, residing abroad, who are not protected by copyright laws abroad or in Chile.
- Works expropriated by the state, unless a beneficiary is specified by law.

== Exceptions to copyright ==
There are exceptions where the law authorised certain uses of works protected by intellectual property law, without going through the permission of the copyright owner, thereby balancing between protecting the interests of authors and the public interest.

Among the exceptions that the Chilean law are:

Quotations

Is the inclusion of a fragment of a person in your own work, respecting the authorship of the original author and source. In Chile quotations is limited to literary works, and is limited to ten lines of text.

Communication and Public Execution

Allows the public communication of works in educational, charitable or similar settings, or at home, if this communication is non-profit.

=== Publication of conferences and public speeches ===
These works can be published for information purposes only.

=== Lessons notes ===
Playable lessons such as teaching notes, sounds or videos, but its publication requires permission from the copyright holder of the lessons.

=== A list of exceptions to copyright ===
Exceptions to copyright are authorizations that the law establishes to make certain uses of protected works, without requiring authorization or payment of remuneration from the author or owner. After the 2010 reform, the catalogue of exceptions was extensively expanded and includes the following provisions:

Article 71 B: Use of short fragments for quotation or for the purposes of criticism, illustration, teaching and research;

Article 71 C: Broad exception for the disabled;

Article 71 D: Exception for lessons in classes and public speeches;

Article 71 E: Exception for demonstration to the public in equipment sales rooms;

Article 71 F: Exception for reproduction of works installed in public spaces;

Articles 71 I, *J, *K and *L: Specific catalogue of exceptions for non-profit libraries and archives;

Article 71 M: Exceptions for educational purposes;

Article 71 N: Exception for communication to the public in domestic, educational and cultural spaces;

Article 71 Ñ: Exception for reverse engineering, backup and study and compatibility of computer programs;

Article 71 O: Exception for temporary copies;

Article 71 P: Exception for satire and parody;

Article 71 Q: Exception of fair or incidental uses;

Article 71 R: Translation exception for private use; and,

Article 71 S: Exception of reproduction and communication to the public for administrative, judicial and legislative uses.

Article 71 N: Exception for communication to the public in domestic, educational and cultural spaces;

Article 71 Ñ: Exception for reverse engineering, backup and study and compatibility of computer programs;

Article 71 O: Exception for temporary copies;

Article 71 P: Exception for satire and parody;

Article 71 Q: Exception of fair or incidental uses;

Article 71 R: Translation exception for private use; and,

Article 71 S: Exception of reproduction and communication to the public for administrative, judicial and legislative uses.

== 2010 law ==
In May 2007, President Michelle Bachelet sent Congress a proposed amendment to this law, pretending to make procedures more effective prosecution of crimes, increase penalties for violations of fronts to establish a system of limiting liability for Internet service providers, incorporate exceptions and limitations that are favorable to libraries, educational establishments and the general public, and regulate the establishment of tariffs by the collecting societies.

The project was very controversial due to the opposition of interests, including the Sociedad Chilena del Derecho de Autor (SCD), the International Federation of the Phonographic Industry, the Chilean Book Chamber on the one hand, and on the other hand are the academic institutions, College of Librarians of Chile, Library Council of Rectors of Universities, NGO Digital Rights, among many others.

The Ministry of Culture, in turn, led the process in Congress, in which signed a controversial confidentiality agreement with the collecting society who agreed to accept a series of demands of copyright holders including the elimination of a number of exceptions for educational use, libraries and primarily uses the exception of the proposal fair. One of the most controversial provisions has been the establishment of an exemption permitting certain uses of protected works without permission, equivalent to the American fair use.

After all the discussion, on 13 January 2010, this flagship project of the administration of Paulina Urrutia was approved unanimously by the National Congress of Chile, entered into force on 4 May 2010, as No. 20.435.
