= Canal 2 Rock & Pop =

Canal 2 Rock Pop
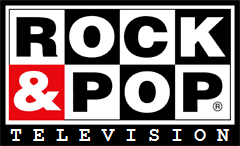
- Country: Chile

Programming
- Language: Spanish
- Picture format: 480i SDTV

Ownership
- Parent: Radio Cooperativa Televisión S.A. (1995-1997); Sociedad Rock & Pop S.A. (1997-1998); Canal 2 S.A. (1998-1999)

History
- Launched: 16 August 1995; 30 years ago
- Closed: 1 December 1999; 26 years ago
- Replaced by: VidaVisión (1999-2005); Telecanal (2005-2026)
- Former names: Rock & Pop (1995-1998); Canal 2 (1998-1999)

Availability

Terrestrial
- Analog VHF: Channel 2 (Santiago)

Canal 2, also known as Rock & Pop Televisión and Canal 2 Rock & Pop, was a Chilean over-the-air television channel launched on August 16, 1995. Its studios were located in warehouse 15 on Chucre Manzur Street at the foot of Cerro San Cristóbal, in the area corresponding to Providencia in the Bellavista neighborhood.

The channel was part of a multimedia holding company that brought together the radio and the magazine of the same name, all owned by Radio Cooperativa. It is considered an experiment in terms of programmatic formats, since it emerged during the democratic transition process in Chile, a time when young people began to express themselves more freely after the end of the military dictatorship. Its main objective was to transfer the success of the Rock & Pop brand to the local screen.

In 1998, after a series of administrative and programming decisions that caused the progressive decline of the project, 38 station officials were fired. On the early hours of December 1, 1999, after the broadcast of the primetime show Plaza Italia, the midnight edition of the news program El Pulso and an episode of Factor humano, the channel suddenly and definitively ceased broadcasting.

== History ==
=== Background ===
Originally, the VHF channel 2 frequency in Santiago housed a high-power relay station operated by Televisión Nacional de Chile in Cerro El Roble (border between the Santiago Metropolitan Region and Valparaíso Region) to relay its signal to other locations. This had to be technically modified on August 28, 1991 to accommodate a new television station for Santiago.

Channel 2 had been solicited by Compañía Chilena de Televisión and Radio Cooperativa Televisión. La Red gave up on the bidding in July 1991, since it had obtained VHF frequency 4 in Santiago; as consequence, the license was granted to Radio Cooperativa following a political agreement in October 1991. Its launch, however, had been delayed several times.

Compañía Chilena de Comunicaciones' first idea was to develop a news channel operated by Radio Cooperativa's news department, but the national market was still not ready for that format. At the time of the launch of Radio Rock & Pop, since the beginning, it was aimed to be a multiplatform brand for several platforms, which included the radio station, a magazine and a TV channel.

Since its license was delayed several times, the deadline for its launch was August 1995. Since Cooperativa lacked the capacity of producing audiovisual content, in 1994, it associated with production company Estudio Visión (owned by Juan Enrique Forch and Eduardo Bustos) to develop programming for the future channel. During that year, a creative-programming committee was formed composed of Iván Valenzuela, Marco Silva, María Elena Wood, Alberto Fuguet, Juan Enrique Forch and Eduardo Bustos.

Canal 2 had an initial investment estimated at US$6 million of the time, equivalent to US$10,7 million in 2021 (adjusted for inflation). In the advertising field, the station sold well before stating broadcasting, mainly for the power of the radio station's brand; however, as the early months had passed, all sponsors had quit their advertising commitments.

=== Early phase ===
At 3pm on August 16, 1995, the broadcasts of Canal 2 Rock & Pop, owned by Compañía Chilena de Comunicaciones in collaboration with production company Estudio Visión, made their official start. It emerged as a segmented over-the-air alternative television station, aimed at the youth between ages 15 and 29, under a concept similar to the radio station of the same name. In its early days on air, the channel was heavily criticized for its amateurism shown on screen. In September, after its first fifteen days on air, the channel made its first readjustments to the schedule in response to negative criticism of the quality of its programming. The following programs were cancelled: Viva Zeta, which only aired three editions, and La licuadora. Other programs changed their airtime or length, or modified their aesthetic.

On February 22, 1996, after tensions between Ajenjo, Valenzuela and Forch, Cooperativa decided to buy Estudio Visión for approximately US$1 million. Compañía Chilena de Comunicaciones took complete control on its editorial line and program production, to which figures such as Marcelo Comparini and Katherine Salosny arrived in the following months.

=== New licensee ===
CCC decided to separate its subsidiaries Radio Cooperativa and Multimedios Rock & Pop on April 7, 1997, transferring the television license from Radio Cooperativa Televisión to Sociedad Rock & Pop S.A..

=== Sale attempts ===
In May 1998, Rock & Pop Televisión subscribed a strategic alliance with the Venezuelan-American investment fund Iberoamerican Media Partners, owned by Grupo Cisneros and Hicks, Muse, Tate & Furst. The agreement considered the sale of 75% of the channel's ownership and 50% of radio stations Corazón and Rock & Pop (who, after the failure of the process, joined the nascent conglomerate Ibero American Radio Chile), aside from its magazine (which reached its end in December 1998). The transaction had an approximate value of US$17 million. On July 27, the network's license is handed over from Rock and Pop S.A. to Canal 2 S.A.

The channel ceased being known as Rock & Pop on August 1, 1998, after the formalization of the new name of the company, this time named Canal 2 S.A., company which, in principle, was owned by Iberoamerican Media Partners and Compañía Chilena de Comunicaciones. On August 3, the National Television Council cuestioned that Canal 2 was being administered by Chilevisión executives (which at the time was also owned by Organización Cisneros), as was announced when it was informed of the announcement of the sale of the youth station to Iberoamerican Media Partners. This condition left Iberoamerican to replant the economical terms of the license, and finally retracted from the sale of the channel in exchange for damages worth nearly US$2 million. On October 13, the failure of the sale of Canal 2 to the binational consortium IMP (Iberoamerican Media Partners) was made official, lo which caused the immediate restructuring of the company. In its programming, four original programs were removed, 38 staff from the production and technical departments were fired, as well as some key faces, and the number of hours on air increased from 13 to 17, airing music videos, music specials and infomercials during daytime hours to continue only from 9pm with its news programming. Finally, there were talks held in 1999 for the station to be acquired by Bancard, but the two did not reach an agreement.

=== Shutdown ===
On the early hours of December 1, 1999, the station's staff and presenters were notified of the definitive closure of the channel, which recorded debts of 721 million Chilean pesos in the January–September 1999 period alone. After the airing of Plaza Italia, El pulso and Factor humano, Canal 2 executive director Luis Ajenjo communicated the news to those who were still working. In those moments of tension, they were all aware that the television station would not see the light of day again. This marked Canal 2's departure from the airwaves.

It was in the newscast (El Pulso) where the tension that existed in those hours was more noted: during the bulletin, the presenter gave its last report, the rise in oil prices in gas stations during the week and the restrictions for cars on December 1, 1999, to later show on camera:

Eso es todo en informaciones, que tenga un buen despertar, de seguro nosotros no lo tendremos. (That's all in news, hope you wake up well, certainly we won't.)

But the presenter, Pablo Véliz, changed the phrase for:

Es todo en informaciones nos vemos mañana, si Dios quiere. Buenas noches. (That's all in news, see you tomorrow, if God wants to. Good night.)

— Pablo Véliz

This contrasted with the tense environment that existed inside the channel, by knowing that the station was going to shut down. After these last words, the channel aired an episode of El Factor Humano corresponding to its final hour of schedule. After its sign-off, only eight hours of music videos were broadcast, and, unusually, two editions of La hora azul were broadcast (reporting details prior to the final matchweek of the national championship and the obtaining that year of the title by Universidad de Chile). The electoral campaign for the 1999 and 2000 presidential elections was also shown. These acts were made to avoid the cancelling of Canal 2's broadcast license considering that, according to the Chilean media law, a television station should broadcast a daily minimum of eight hours of programming a day. These events pressured Compañía Chilena de Comunicaciones to sign an agreement with VidaVisión to air music videos and religious programming from an Evangelical church.

Years later, Jaime Cuadrado obtained the license and on December 5, 2005, the Telecanal network was launched. However, the latter only occupied the frequency previously used by Rock & Pop, since the Chucre Manzur studios that were used during the operation of the latter were occupied by TVI (Via X, Zona Latina).

Compañía Chilena de Comunicaciones was the owner of the license until July 2005, when the station was transferred to Telecanal, license acquired by Jaime Cuadrado which started broadcasting on December 5, 2005. However, the station only uses the frequency previously employed by Rock & Pop, since the Chucre Manzur studios were occupied by TVI, produced of two Chilean cable music channels (Via X, Zona Latina).

== Announcers ==
- Jaime Muñoz Villarroel (1995-1996)
- Patricio Gutiérrez (1996-1997)
- Mauricio Torres (1997-1999)
- Juan Ignacio Abarca (July-December 1999)

== Bibliography ==
- Correa, Javier; Pentz, María Ignacia (October 1, 2018). Nunca cumplimos 30: Una historia oral del Canal 2 Rock & Pop. Libros de Mentira. ISBN 978-956-9136-59-7.
