= Ibero Americana Radio Chile =

Chilean radio conglomerate

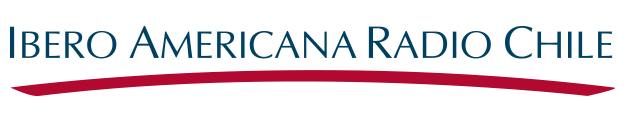
Ibero Americana Radio Chile Logo

Ibero Americana Radio Chile is the main Chilean radio conglomerate belonging to PRISA Radio, a subsidiary of the Spanish group PRISA.

== Location ==
The offices and studios of all IARC radios (except ADN) are located at Eliodoro Yanez 1783, Providencia, Santiago. The ADN studies, are next to its corporate building, in Eliodoro Yáñez 1804.

== Stations ==
=== Modulated frequency ===
- ADN Radio
- Concierto
- Corazón
- FM Dos
- Futuro
- Imagina
- Los 40
- Pudahuel
- Radio Activa
- Rock & Pop

=== Internet ===
- Radio Uno

=== Missing stations ===
- Bésame Radio.
- FM Hit.
- W Radio.

== Current frequencies ==
=== Northern zone ===
Arica y Parinacota Region

- Arica
  - 88.1 MHz Concierto
  - 89.7 MHz Radio Activa
  - 91.5 MHz Pudahuel
  - 95.3 MHz ADN Radio Chile
  - 97.7 MHz Radio Imagina
  - 98.5 MHz Los 40
  - 99.5 MHz Futuro
  - 100.7 MHz FM Dos
  - 105.3 MHz Corazón FM

Tarapacá Region

- Iquique
  - 89.7 MHz Los 40
  - 90.7 MHz Radio Activa
  - 93.9 MHz Rock & Pop
  - 94.7 MHz Corazón FM
  - 96.3 MHz Concierto
  - 101.3 MHz FM Dos
  - 103.1 MHz ADN Radio Chile
  - 103.7 MHz Pudahuel
  - 105.3 MHz Radio Imagina
  - 105.7 MHz Futuro

Antofagasta Region

- Calama
  - 91.1 MHz ADN Radio Chile
  - 95.3 MHz Pudahuel
  - 98.5 MHz Radio Activa
  - 103.5 MHz Corazón FM
  - 104.7 MHz FM Dos
- Antofagasta
  - 88.9 MHz ADN Radio Chile
  - 90.7 MHz Concierto
  - 91.5 MHz Corazón FM
  - 94.5 MHz Futuro
  - 95.9 MHz Pudahuel
  - 98.5 MHz FM Dos
  - 100.5 MHz Radio Activa
  - 105.1 MHz Los 40

Atacama Region

- Copiapó
  - 89.3 MHz Pudahuel
  - 92.1 MHz Radio Activa
  - 94.7 MHz Corazón FM
  - 97.7 MHz Los 40
  - 98.9 MHz Radio Imagina
  - 101.7 MHz ADN Radio Chile
  - 102.5 MHz Concierto
  - 104.9 MHz Futuro
  - 105.7 MHz FM Dos

Coquimbo Region

- La Serena/Coquimbo
  - 89.5 MHz ADN Radio Chile
  - 90.1 MHz Concierto
  - 91.7 MHz Corazón FM
  - 92.3 MHz Futuro
  - 96.3 MHz Rock & Pop
  - 99.9 MHz Pudahuel
  - 100.9 MHz Radio Activa
  - 105.3 MHz FM Dos
  - 105.7 MHz Los 40
  - 106.3 MHz Radio Imagina
- Ovalle
  - 90.1 MHz Radio Activa
  - 92.7 MHz Pudahuel
  - 98.1 MHz ADN Radio Chile
  - 104.3 MHz FM Dos
  - 105.1 MHz Corazón FM
- Tongoy
  - 98.9 MHz ADN Radio Chile

=== Central zone ===
Valparaíso Region

  - 90.3 MHz Radio Imagina
  - 91.7 MHz Los 40
  - 93.1 MHz Concierto
  - 94.1 MHz ADN Radio Chile
  - 100.5 MHz Corazón FM
  - 104.5 MHz FM Dos
  - 105.7 MHz Pudahuel
- San Felipe/Los Andes
  - 89.3 MHz FM Dos
  - 90.1 MHz Pudahuel
  - 96.9 MHz ADN Radio Chile
- San Antonio
  - 88.7 MHz Radio Activa
  - 91.5 MHz ADN Radio Chile
  - 94.3 MHz Corazón FM
  - 94.7 MHz Pudahuel
  - 100.9 MHz FM Dos
- Rapa Nui
  - 88.3 MHz ADN Radio Chile
  - 104.3 MHz Los 40

Santiago Metropolitan Region

  - 88.1 MHz Imagina
  - 88.5 MHz Concierto
  - 88.9 MHz Futuro
  - 90.5 MHz Pudahuel
  - 91.7 MHz ADN Radio Chile
  - 92.5 MHz Radio Activa
  - 94.1 MHz Rock & Pop
  - 98.5 MHz FM Dos
  - 101.3 MHz Corazón
  - 101.7 MHz Los 40

O'Higgins Region

- Rancagua
  - 91.7 MHz Pudahuel
  - 100.7 MHz Los 40
  - 101.1 MHz FM Dos
  - 103.7 MHz ADN Radio Chile
  - 104.3 MHz Corazón

Maule Region

- Curicó
  - 97.7 MHz ADN Radio Chile
- Talca
  - 90.3 MHz Pudahuel
  - 93.5 MHz ADN Radio Chile
  - 98.1 MHz FM Dos
  - 98.9 MHz Radio Imagina
  - 100.1 MHz Radio Activa
  - 104.5 MHz Corazón FM
- Constitución
  - 90.1 MHz ADN Radio Chile
- Linares
  - 88.9 MHz Pudahuel
  - 91.3 MHz ADN Radio Chile
  - 93.1 MHz Corazón FM
- Parral
  - 89.3 MHz ADN Radio Chile
- Cauquenes
  - 95.1 MHz Los 40
  - 98.3 MHz ADN Radio Chile

Ñuble Region

- Chillán
  - 96.3 MHz FM Dos
  - 101.3 MHz ADN Radio Chile
  - 103.9 MHz Pudahuel

Biobío Region

- Gran Concepción
  - 92.5 MHz Los 40
  - 93.1 MHz Rock & Pop
  - 96.1 MHz Corazón FM
  - 99.9 MHz Pudahuel
  - 101.1 MHz FM Dos
  - 104.1 MHz ADN Radio Chile
  - 106.5 MHz Radio Futuro
- Los Ángeles
  - 90.3 MHz Pudahuel
  - 103.1 MHz Corazón FM
  - 104.9 MHz ADN Radio Chile

=== Southern zone ===
Araucania Region

- Temuco
  - 90.3 MHz Pudahuel
  - 92.1 MHz ADN Radio Chile
  - 92.9 MHz Los 40
  - 93.5 MHz FM Dos
  - 95.5 MHz Radio Activa
  - 104.7 MHz Futuro
  - 105.7 MHz Corazón FM
- Villarrica/Pucón
  - 89.1 MHz Los 40
  - 89.7 MHz Pudahuel
  - 97.1 MHz ADN Radio Chile
  - 98.1 MHz Radio Concierto
  - 102.3 MHz ADN Radio Chile
  - 106.5 MHz FM Dos

Los Rios Region

- Valdivia
  - 92.5 MHz Pudahuel
  - 97.3 MHz Corazón FM
  - 99.3 MHz Los 40
  - 100.5 MHz FM Dos
  - 102.3 MHz Radio Concierto
  - 104.1 MHz ADN Radio Chile
- Futrono
  - 89.3 MHz ADN Radio Chile

Los Lagos Region

- Osorno
  - 89.7 MHz Corazón FM
  - 91.9 MHz Pudahuel
  - 92.3 MHz ADN Radio Chile
  - 97.1 MHz FM Dos
- Puerto Varas.
  - 88.5 MHz ADN Radio Chile
- Puerto Montt
  - 88.1 MHz ADN Radio Chile
  - 89.9 MHz Radio Corazón
  - 95.5 MHz Pudahuel
  - 100.3 MHz Radio Activa
  - 102.5 MHz Los 40
  - 104.5 MHz FM Dos
  - 105.9 MHz Futuro
- Ancud/Castro
  - 93.7 MHz Pudahuel
  - 104.3 MHz ADN Radio Chile (Castro)
  - 106.5 MHz ADN Radio Chile (Ancud)

Aysén Region

- Coyhaique
  - 89.5 MHz Corazón FM
  - 92.9 MHz Radio Activa
  - 94.5 MHz FM Dos
  - 101.5 MHz Radio Imagina
  - 105.1 MHz ADN Radio Chile
  - 106.5 MHz Pudahuel

Magallanes and Chilean Antarctica Region

- Punta Arenas
  - 89.7 MHz Futuro
  - 91.5 MHz Corazón FM
  - 92.1 MHz FM Dos
  - 92.7 MHz Radio Concierto
  - 93.5 MHz ADN Radio Chile
  - 94.7 MHz Los 40
  - 98.3 MHz Pudahuel
  - 105.7 MHz Radio Activa

=== Notes ===
- At the beginning of 2002, Radio Corazón leaves 94.5 MHz in Antofagasta, being replaced by Radio Futuro.
- On April 1, 2007, Radio Imagina leaves 100.5 MHz in Viña del Mar and Valparaíso and 91.5 MHz in Antofagasta, being replaced in both cases by Radio Corazón. On that same date Radio Concierto leaves 96.1 MHz in Concepción and Talcahuano, being replaced by the same Radio Corazón.
- In 2008, Rock & Pop leaves 89.1 in Villarrica, being replaced by Los 40.
- In May 2008, Rock & Pop leaves 105.5 in Algarrobo, and Radio Pudahuel leaves 94.3 MHz in Vallenar, being replaced in both cases by ADN Radio Chile, in that same one Date Radio Pudahuel leaves 92.9 MHz in Constitución, being replaced by Radio Imagina, which emigrated from the 90.1 MHz (current ADN Radio Chile).
- In May 2008, Radio Corazón moves from 91.5 MHz to 88.7 MHz in the city of Chillán, a frequency previously occupied by ADN Radio Chile.
- In May 2008, FM Dos leaves 92.7 MHz in Los Ángeles.
- In May 2008, Radio Corazón left 96.9 MHz in Puerto Montt and 106.7 in Ancud, being replaced by Positiva FM and ADN Radio Chile, respectively.
- In June 2008, Radio Concierto leaves 92.3 MHz in Panguipulli, being replaced by ADN Radio Chile.
- On March 13, 2009, Radio Concierto leaves 98.9 in Tongoy, 101.5 in Lago Rapel, 89.3 in Futrono and 103.1 in Puerto Varas, being replaced by ADN Radio Chile.
- At the beginning of 2011, Radio Imagina leaves 105.1 MHz for the second time in Antofagasta, being replaced by its sister Los 40. This because the previous frequency (97.1 MHz) was leased and is currently used by Digital FM, has no relation with IARC.
- On August 5, 2013, Rock & Pop leaves 97.7 in Punta Arenas, being replaced by My Radio.
- On March 17, 2014, ADN Radio Chile changed frequency in Puerto Varas from 103.1 to 88.5 MHz, leaving in 103.1 to Radio Imagina. (Note: This to allow the entry of Radio Bío-Bío to 88.9, formerly in 107.3.)
- In 2014, by community radio law, in order to order commercial radios and low reception, several radios of the consortium had to be relocated on the dial:
  - In Arica, Radio Corazón moves from the 107.5 MHz to 105.3 MHz.
  - In Iquique, Radio Futuro moves from the 107.3 MHz to 105.7 MHz.
  - In Calama, ADN Radio Chile moves from the 107.1 MHz to 91.1 MHz.
  - In La Serena y Coquimbo, FM Dos moves from the 107.9 MHz to 105.3 MHz.
  - In Valparaíso, Los 40 moves from the 107.1 MHz to 91.7 MHz. The same happens with Radio Pudahuel, moving from the 107.7 MHz to 105.7 MHz.
  - In Los Ángeles, Radio Imagina changed the 106.7 to 104.1 MHz.
  - In Pucón, ADN Radio Chile moves from the 107.1 MHz to 102.3 MHz.
  - In Valdivia, Radio Imagina moves from the 107.5 to 106.1 MHz.
  - In Puerto Montt, Radio Pudahuel changed the 106.9 to 95.5 MHz.
  - In Coyhaique, FM Dos moves from the 106.9 MHz to 94.5 MHz.
- During the last time also several frequencies of the conglomerate stopped to emit because in these frequencies began to issue the transmitter evangelical Radio Armonía:
  - On July 31, 2014, Rock & Pop leaves 104.9 MHz in Copiapó and Tierra Amarilla being replaced by Radio Futuro. (Note: This is because Armonía began broadcasting on the 90.3 MHz frequency, previously used by Futuro.)
  - On August 19, 2014, Radio Concierto leaves 93.9 MHz in San Antonio and Litoral Central.
  - On September 23, 2014, Los 40 leaves 99.1 MHz in San Felipe and Los Andes.
  - On September 15, 2014, Radio Activa leaves 96.7 MHz in Valdivia.
  - As of January 2, 2015, Los 40 leaves 102.9 MHz in Talca.
  - On January 2, 2015, Radio Imagina leaves 103.1 MHz in Puerto Montt.
  - On January 1, 2015, ADN Radio Chile leaves 103.5 MHz in Melipilla.
  - On March 23, 2016, Rock & Pop leaves 93.1 in Valparaíso, being replaced by Radio Concierto. (Note: This because the previous frequency of Concierto (101.7) was sold to the evangelical station.)
- On February 25, 2016, Radio Uno stopped broadcasting on Santiago's 97.1 MHz, because the proposal was no longer new. The signal was leased and is currently used by Radio Corporación, a Christian court (it has no relation with IARC) and Radio Uno will continue as an online signal for everything Chile and the world.
- In September 2016, ADN Radio Chile leaves the 102.7 MHz of Rengo and Radio Uno leaves 91.1 MHz of La Serena and Coquimbo, both were sold and replaced by Radio Corporación.
- On December 23, 2016, ADN Radio Chile leaves 91.5 MHz of Pinto, being replaced by Radio Imagina.
- On January 1, 2017, Rock & Pop leaves 89.9 of Puerto Montt, being replaced by Radio Corazón returning to the city after almost 9 years of absence.
- On May 9, 2017, Radio Activa leaves 88.5 of Osorno, being replaced and sold by Radio Corporación.
- On May 10, 2017, Rock & Pop leaves 102.5 of Arica, being replaced and sold by Radio Corporación.
- On May 16, 2017, Rock & Pop leaves 93.5 of Osorno, being replaced Radioactiva returning to the city after almost 6 days of absence, whose frequency (88.5) in the city had been sold to Radio Corporación.
- On March 8, 2019, Radio Imagina leaves 106.5 MHz of Calama, being sold and replaced by Radio Desierto, has no relation with IARC.
- On December 15, 2019, Radio Imagina leaves 91.5 MHz of Pinto.
- On November 4, 2021, Radio Imagina leaves 106.1 MHz of Valdivia, being sold and replaced by Radio Beethoven, has no relation with IARC.
- On November 4, 2021, Rock & Pop leaves 102.3 MHz of Valdivia, being replaced by Radio Concierto returning to the city after 1 year of absence.

== Premios Musa ==
On 4 December, 2020, the broadcaster confirmed the first edition of the Musa Awards. The award ceremony aims to reward the most successful Chilean and international artists in the different radio stations.
