= Piatã FM =

Piatã FM (ZYC 298)
- Salvador, Bahia; Brazil
- Frequency: 94.3 MHz

Programming
- Language: Portuguese

Ownership
- Owner: Daltro de Castro Ferreira family

History
- Founded: 1978

Technical information
- Licensing authority: ANATEL
- ERP: 105.11 kW
- Transmitter coordinates: 12°58′41.9″S 38°29′50.2″W

Links
- Public license information: Profile
- Webcast: https://tudoradio.com/player/radio/505-piata-fm
- Website: https://piatafm.com.br/

Piatã FM is a Brazilian radio station based in Salvador, Bahia, with a programming focused on pagode music. It broadcasts on the frequency 94.3 MHz. The station propelled the careers of several Bahian pagode groups in the 1990s and 2000s, such as É o Tchan!, Terra Samba, Parangolé, and Harmonia do Samba. Piatã FM leads in total number of listeners in the city of Salvador, with over 740,000, according to Kantar IBOPE Media.

== History ==
The station was founded in 1978 by Wilson Menezes, who also owned the radio station Excelsior AM. Initially, it operated from a building in the Historic Center of Salvador and later moved to Praça da Sé. In 1982, the station was acquired by Congressman Cristóvão Ferreira, who was passionate about samba and radio. While Itapoan FM focused on axé music in the early 1980s, Piatã FM invested in Bahian pagode in the 1990s. The group É o Tchan! was the first group the station supported.

The station achieved the second highest average audience rating in Brazil in 2001. In October 2022, Piatã FM relocated its studios to the Shopping Bela Vista mall in the Cabula neighborhood. Its transmitters and tower remain at the station's former headquarters in Brotas. In May of the same year, Cristóvão Ferreira's son, Cristóvão Júnior, returned as a partner of the station, but the following year, music industry businessman Léo Góes acquired 25% of Piatã FM's shares, which belonged to Cristóvão Júnior, while the remainder stayed with the Daltro de Castro Ferreira family.
