= Rock & Pop (Chilean radio) =

Radio station in Chile

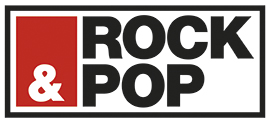
- Santiago, Chile; Chile
- Broadcast area: National Territory of Chile
- Frequencies: 94.1 MHz (Santiago); 93.9 MHz (Iquique); 96.3 MHz (La Serena/Coquimbo); 93.1 MHz (Gran Concepción); Canal 661 VTR; Canal 975 Telsur

Programming
- Format: Hot Adult Contemporary

Ownership
- Owner: Iberoamericana Radio Chile
- Sister stations: Radio Futuro, Radio Concierto, Radio Activa, Radio Uno, ADN Radio Chile, Radio Imagina, FM Dos, Los 40, Radio Pudahuel, Corazón FM

History
- First air date: December 1, 1992

Technical information
- Class: ABC1, C2 and C3

Links
- Webcast: Listen Live
- Website: rockandpop.cl

Rock & Pop is a radio station located at 94.1 MHz on the FM dial in Santiago, Chile and is a member of the radio consortium Ibero Americana Radio Chile. Its musical programming consists his programmatic and musical line is conformed mainly by great successes of music from the 1960s to the present.

== History ==
Transmissions began in Santiago on December 1, 1992, under the auspices of the Chilean Communications Company, owner of Radio Cooperativa. The first song played was "It's My Life" by Dr. Alban. Before its debut in Santiago, the station was broadcast in the city of Temuco at 93.5 FM as a sort of trial run, starting on October 1, 1992. Local programming continued in Temuco until January 1, 1998, when local facilities were closed and the signal received from Santiago was broadcast instead.

The first months of the station's life were marked by a legal dispute with an Argentinian radio station of the same name, founded in 1985. The dispute did not end in court, however there was speculation about the purchase of the Chilean station by its Argentinian namesake, or a demand to license the brand.

In 1995, the station played an influential role in the "small Chilean rock boom", which was conceived during that time. It was the main promoter of bands such as Los Tres, Lucybell, Los Tetas, Pánico, and La Ley, among others. Its success was such that it entered into television programming. The legendary Canal 2 Rock & Pop introduced personages and content from the radio to the small screen, and similarly the magazine Revista Rock & Pop brought content from the radio to print.

== Direction and administration ==
The radio station was directed from its inception until May 2004 by Marcelo Aldunate, currently music director of Ibero Americana Radio Chile. Replacing him until October 2006 was one of the station's original presenters, Patricio Cuevas. Cuevas has been succeeded by Mauricio Soto, Rodrigo Alvarez, Sergio Cancino, and currently Carlos Costas, (director of Radio Futuro and ADN Deportes).

== Notable former staff ==
- Blanca Lewin
- Claudia Conserva
- Jean Philippe Cretton (2013–2015)
- Renata Ruiz (2013–2016)
