= Radio Cooperativa =

Chilean radio station

Radio Cooperativa is a radio station in Chile, based in Santiago. It is operated by Chilean Communications Company. The station is notable for opposing the Augusto Pinochet dictatorship and denouncing its human rights violations at a time when reports of said wrongdoings were federally suppressed. The station has historic ties with Chile's Christian Democratic party. In 2020, Radio Cooperativa inked a content sharing agreement with China Media Group. It broadcasts on AM frequencies 660 and 1140 or 1150 (kHz), also known as CB-66, CB-114 and CB-115.

== See also ==
- Canal 2 Rock & Pop
