= Fernando Paulsen =

Chilean journalist

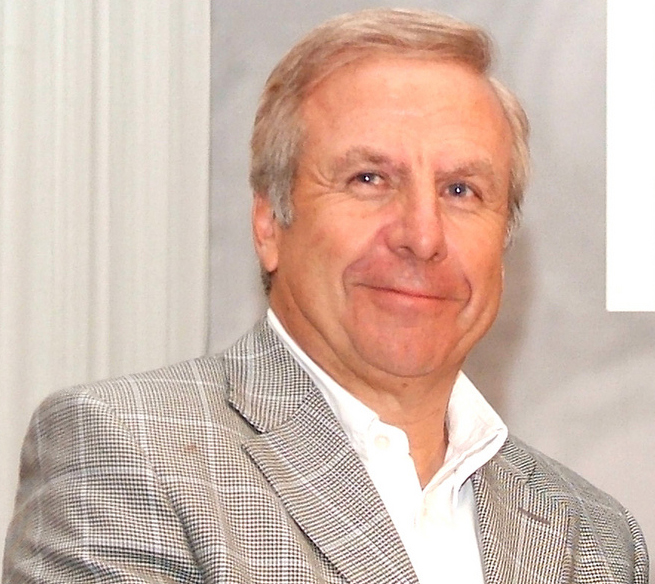
- Born: Fernando José Paulsen Silva; 11 March 1956 (age 70); Santiago, Chile
- Education: Pontifical Catholic University of Chile; University of North Texas (BA); University of Texas at Austin (MA); Harvard Kennedy School (MPA)
- Occupation: Journalist
- Awards: Premio Embotelladora Andina (2012)

Fernando José Paulsen Silva (Santiago, 11 March 1956) is a Chilean radio journalist, television presenter, columnist, sports and political commentator.

Additional information is available on the Spanish Wikipedia Entry for Paulsen.
