= Greater Valparaíso =

Metropolitan area in Chile

Coordinates: 33°02′46″S 71°37′20″W

Greater Valparaíso Gran Valparaíso
- Metropolitan area
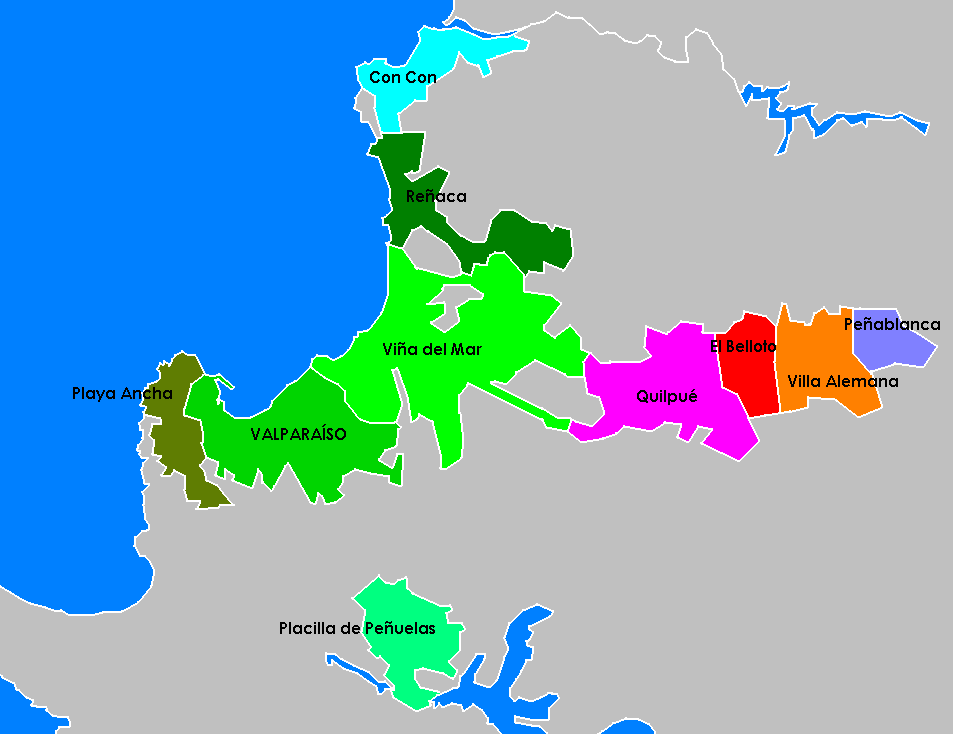
- Map of the Greater Valparaiso

- Location within Chile
- Subdivision: Valparaíso; Viña del Mar; Placilla de Peñuelas; Reñaca; Concón; Quilpué; Villa Alemana

Population
  - Total: 1,036,127

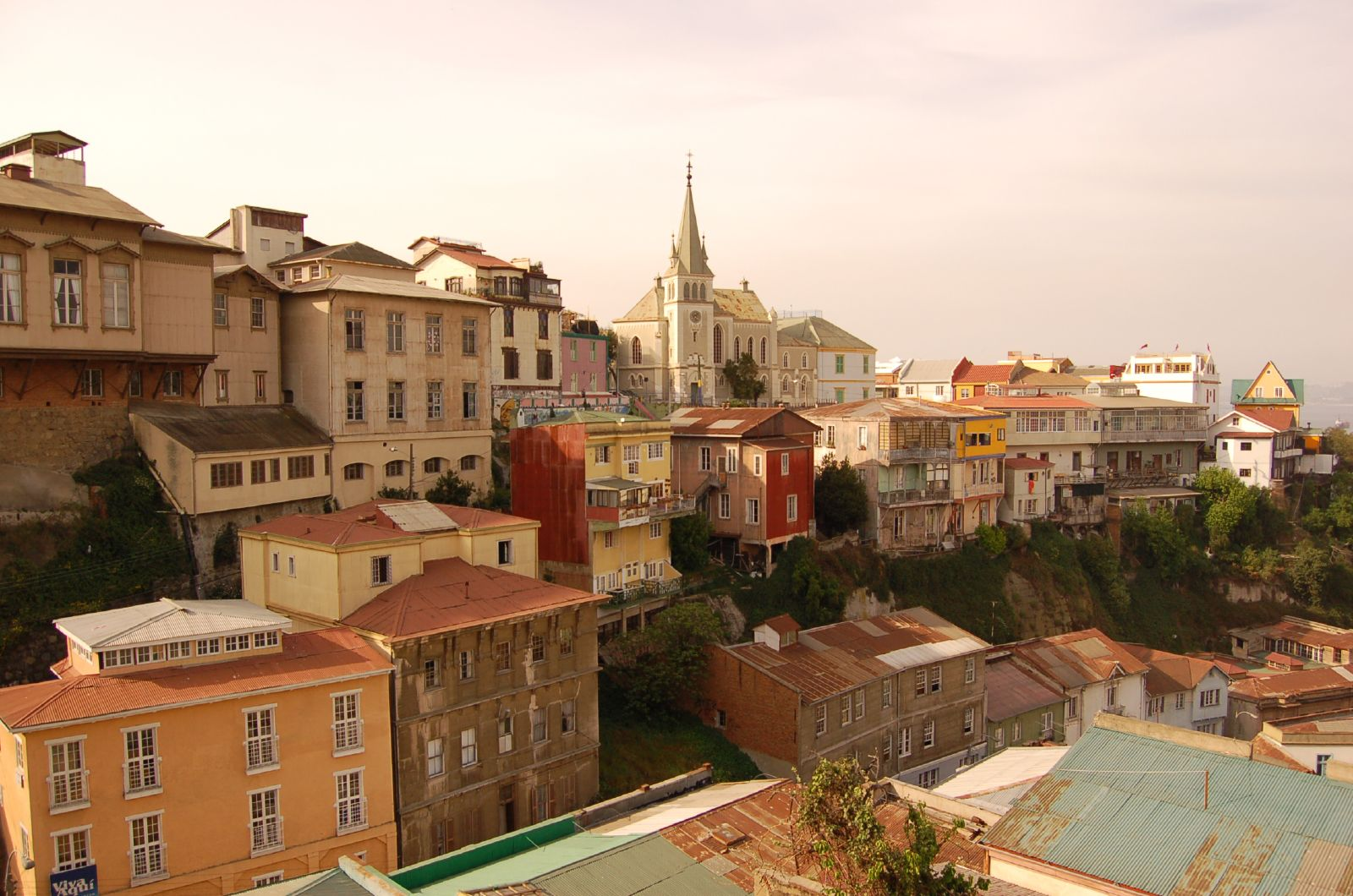
Cerro Concepción, Valparaíso

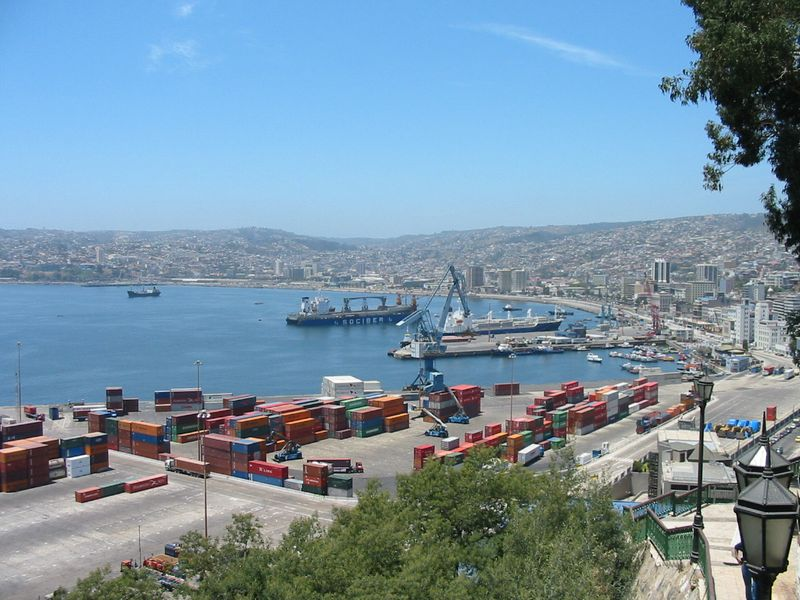
Port of Valparaíso

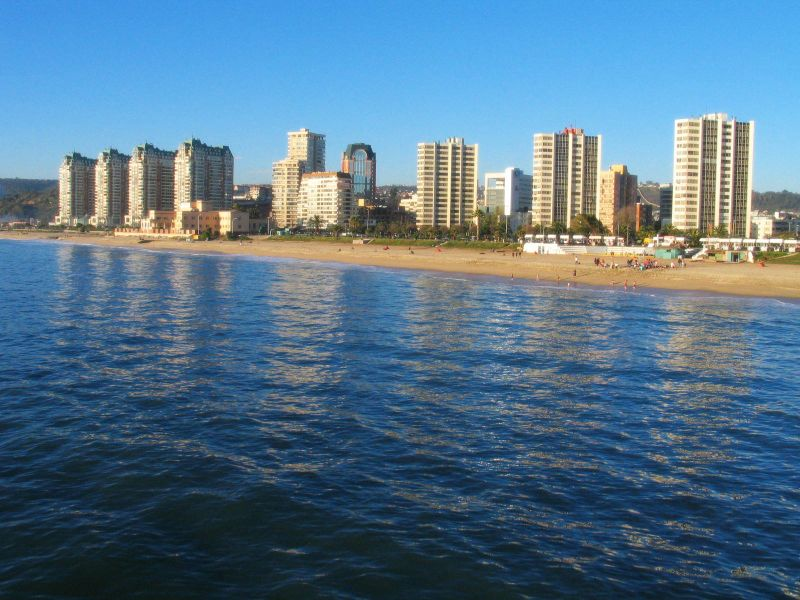
Beach in Viña del Mar

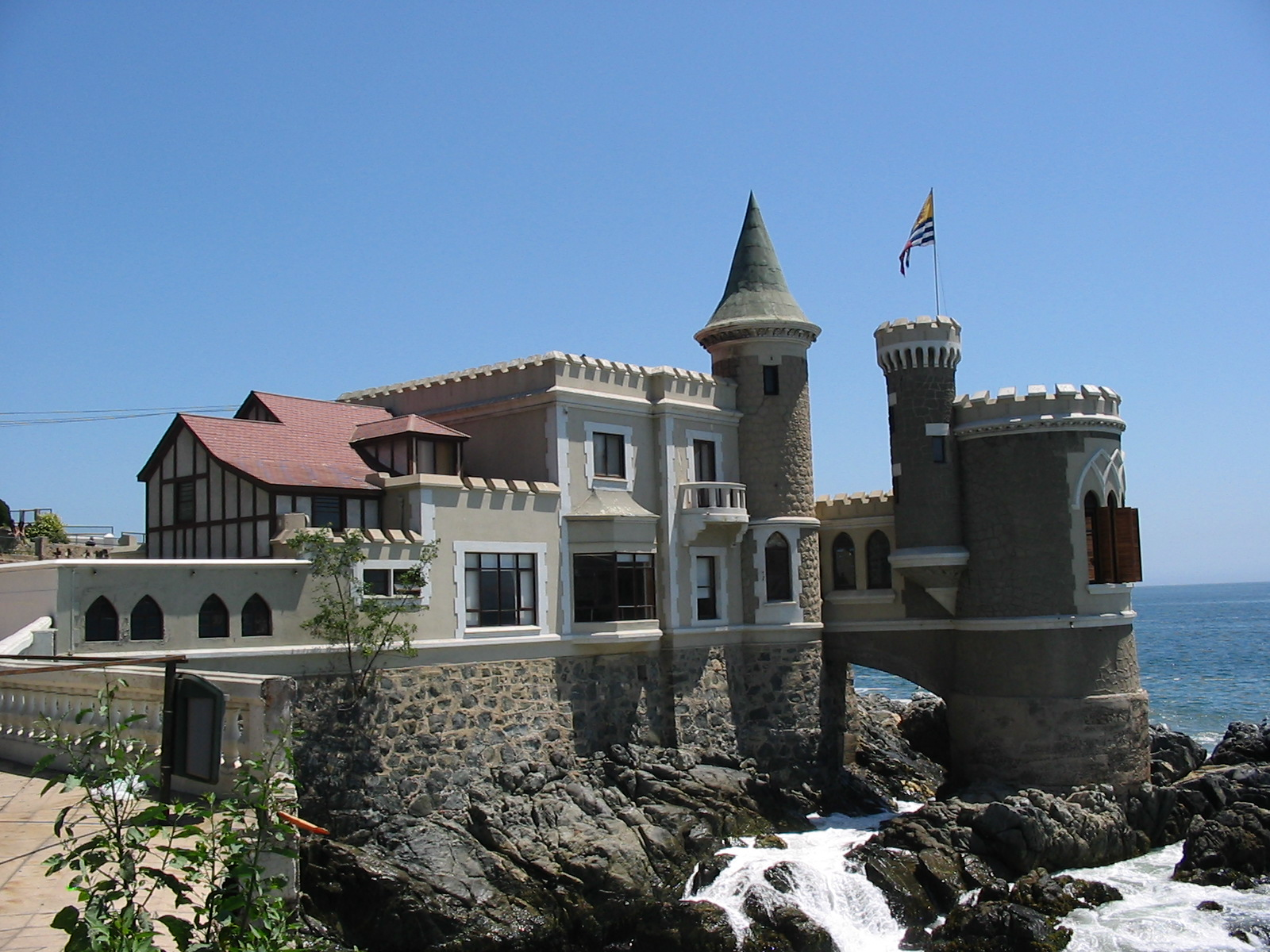
Wulff Castle, Viña del Mar

Greater Valparaíso (Gran Valparaíso) is the third largest metropolitan area in Chile, after the Greater Concepción and Greater Santiago. It takes this name after the city of Valparaíso, the oldest city of the group and the most important harbour in Chile. Its total population is 979,127 at the 2012 census, with an area of 401.6 square kilometers.

== Communes ==
The agglomeration is composed of five communes (Spanish: comunas), and each is governed by its respective municipality:

- Valparaíso
- Viña del Mar
- Concón
- Quilpué
- Villa Alemana

These communes have the following characteristics:

- Valparaíso, Viña del Mar and Concón are coastal cities. Villa Alemana and Quipué are located in inner valleys and belong to the group of cities known as El Interior (The Interior).
- Valparaíso and Viña del Mar have traditionally concentrated industrial and commercial activities, while Quilpué and Villa Alemana are primarily residential, and therefore often considered ciudades dormitorio (sleeper cities).

== Infrastructure ==
=== Education ===
Gran Valparaíso also has the third largest concentration of universities in Chile. Besides the Traditional Universities, it has several private institutions, including Universidad Adolfo Ibáñez, Universidad Andrés Bello, and Universidad del Mar.

=== Transportation ===
There is a rapid transit light rail system which serves most of the communes in the conurbation: The Valparaíso Metro. Bus routes almost always span multiple communes and are organized via the Transporte Metropolitano de Valparaíso.

=== Tourism ===
The area is a major tourist draw due to the internationally important Viña del Mar International Song Festival, its balnearios (beaches and resorts). The Historic Quarter of the Seaport City of Valparaíso is listed as a UNESCO World Heritage Site for its cultural significance.
