= Radio Uno (Chile) =

- Santiago, Chile; Chile
- Broadcast area: Territory national of Chile

History
- First air date: April 18, 2008
- Last air date: February 25, 2016 (Santiago de Chile); September 1, 2016 (La Serena/Coquimbo); 2020 (online)

Radio Uno was a radio station located at 97.1 MHz on the FM dial in Santiago de Chile. It is also transmitted via the internet in the rest of the country and the world.

Began broadcasting on April 18, 2008, in the 97.1 MHz frequency formerly occupied by Radio Activa, which moved to 92.5 MHz

According to sources of the radio group, Ibero American Radio Chile, the idea is to give space to all types of category Chilean music from Lucho Gatica, Buddy Richard and Violeta Parra, to more recent names such as Alamedas, Teleradio Donoso, Los Bunkers, Fahrenheit, De Saloon, Juana Fe, Chico Trujillo, Américo and Francisca Valenzuela, for example.

Finally it is confirmed that the signal of Radio Uno cease to exist on February 25, 2016, at 00:00 hours.

== Past programs ==
- La Picá de UNO (UNO's Pica)
- Los Guardianes de la Parilla (The Keepers of the Grill)
- Escudo Nacional (Coat of Arms)
- Haciendo Patria (Patria making)
- El bailongo de la Uno (Dance hall's Uno)
- Welcome TV (parody of Bienvenidos)
- Tolerancia Suero (parody of Tolerancia Cero)

== Former staff ==
- Lucho Hernández Heríquez
- Ramón Llao
- Pato Bauerle
- Berni Traub
- Sergio Cancino
