= Ruidosa Fest =

Latin American annual music festival

- Genre: Pop; Indie; R&B; Electropop; Folk; Reggaetón; Ballad
- Frequency: Annually
- Locations: O'Higgins Park (2025-present), Lincoln Center (2024-present)
- Years active: 2019–present
- Inaugurated: March 5, 2016; 10 years ago
- Founders: Francisca Valenzuela

Ruidosa Fest, stylized as RUIDOSA Fest, is a Latin American music event centered on women and sexual dissidence artists. Founded in 2016 by Chilean singer-songwriter Francisca Valenzuela, it is the first Latin American festival to feature only women. It has held editions in Chile, United States, Mexico, and Peru.

== History ==
Founded in 2016 by Valenzuela, the first edition of the event was held in March of that same year in Santiago. The lineup included local singers Javiera Mena, Camila Moreno, Denise Rosenthal, Paz Court, Fakuta, Planta Carnívora, Marineros, Natisú, and Valenzuela herself.

In 2024, it held its first U.S. edition in New York, as part of Summer for the City, organized by Lincoln Center. The lineup included Bebel Gilberto, Buscabulla, iLe, Bruses, Nella, Ali Stone, Salt Cathedral, Riobamba, Renee Goust + Khylie Rylo, Flor de Toloache, and Valenzuela.

In March of the following year, the founder and director announced at a concert the fourth edition in Santiago and the second edition in New York for that same year.

In July 2026, the lineup for the fifth edition in Chile and the third edition in New York was announced, featuring Tokischa in Chile and Pabllo Vittar in both editions.

== Editions ==
=== RUIDOSA Fest SCL ===
Edition	Year	Date(s)	Venue	Artists	Ref.
1st	2016	March 5	Fundación Cultural de Providencia	Camila Moreno, Fakuta, Francisca Valenzuela, Marineros, Natisú, Paz Court, Planta Carnívora	
2nd	2017	March 11	Centro Cultural Matucana 100	Carolina Nissen, Chini and The Technicians, Dadalú, Dania Neko, Entrópica, Mamma Soul, Mariel Mariel, MKRNI, Nicole, Playa Gótica, Tomasa del Real, Yorka, Francisca Valenzuela	
3rd	2018	April 7	Centro Cultural Matucana 100	Beatriz Pichi Malén, Cami, Dulce y Agraz, Lia Nadja, Javiera Parra, Mahani Teave, Mazapán, Natalia Norte, Pascuala Ilabaca, Princesa Alba, Natisú, Francisca Valenzuela	
4th	2025	October 11 and 12	O'Higgins Park	Mon Laferte, Myriam Hernández, Francisca Valenzuela, Javiera Mena, Akriila, Princesa Alba, Ms Nina, Villano Antillano, Supernova, Nekki, Javiera Electra, Laia, Karla Grunewaldt, Masquemusica, Nicole, Cami, Chini.png	
5th	2026	October 10 and 11	O'Higgins Park	Tokischa, Pabllo Vittar, Ana Tijoux, Cancamusa, Denisse Malebrán, Karla Melo, Dúo Pajaritos, Camila Moreno, Vesta Lugg, Anttonias, Frank’s White Canvas, Luta Cruz, Rosario Alfonso, Ignacia Fernández	

=== RUIDOSA Fest New York ===
Edition	Year	Date	Venue	Artists	Ref.
1st	2024	August 10	Lincoln Center	Bebel Gilberto, Buscabulla, iLe, Bruses, Nella, Ali Stone, Salt Cathedral, Riobamba, Renee Goust + Khylie Rylo, Mireya Ramos (Flor de Toloache), Francisca Valenzuela	
2nd	2025	August 9	Lincoln Center	Snow Tha Product, Camila Fernández, Yendry, J Noa, Empress Of, PAMÉ, Sofía Rei, MC Millaray, Tayhana	
3rd	2026	July 12	Lincoln Center	Lila Downs, Pabllo Vittar, Francisca Valenzuela, Elsa y Elmar, Rubio, duendita, Edna Vazquez, Dominga & Volvox, Armana Khan.	

=== Ruidosa Fest CDMX ===
Edition	Year	Date	Venue	Artists	Ref.
1°	2016	5 de noviembre	Centro Cultural de España	Ximena Sariñana, Zemmoa, Vanessa Zamora, Daniela Spalla, Le Butcherettes, Planta Carnívora, Francisca Valenzuela	

=== RUIDOSA Fest Lima ===
Edition	Year	Date	Venues	Artists	Ref.
1st	2019	April 11	Centro de Convenciones Barranco y Hotel Selina	Pussy Riot, Pamela Rodríguez, Janice, Mari Ya, Lara Nuh, Maribel Tafur, Sixta, Francisca Valenzuela	
