= The Voice Chile =

Chilean TV program

- Genre: Talent show
- Created by: John de Mol Jr.
- Presented by: Sergio Lagos; Julián Elfenbein; Diana Bolocco
- Judges: Beto Cuevas; Prince Royce; Francisca Valenzuela; El Puma; Yuri; Gente de Zona; Cami; Luis Fonsi; Nicole; Álvaro López; Franco Simone; Ana Torroja
- Country of origin: Chile
- Original language: Spanish
- No. of seasons: 4

Production
- Production locations: Santiago, Chile
- Running time: 120 min.
- Production companies: Talpa (2015–2016); ITV Studios (2022–2023)

Original release
- Network: Canal 13 (2015–2016); Chilevisión (2022–2023)
- Release: March 31, 2015 – June 15, 2023

Related
- The Voice (franchise)

The Voice Chile was a Chilean reality talent show that premiered on Canal 13 in 2015. Based on the original The Voice of Holland, and part of an international franchise, created by John de Mol Jr.

The show is renewed for third season under the new broadcaster, Chilevisión.

== Format ==
The Voice Chile is part of The Voice franchise which is based on the Netherlands original entitled The Voice of Holland. The series consists of three phases: a blind audition, a battle phase, and live performance shows. Four coaches, all noteworthy recording artists, choose teams of contestants through a blind audition process. Each coach has the length of the auditioners performance to decide if he or she wants that singer on his or her team; if two or more judges want the same singer (as happens frequently), the singer has the final choice of coach.

Each team of singers is mentored and developed by its respective coach. In the second stage, called the battle phase, coaches have two of their team members battle against each other directly by singing the same song together, with the coach choosing which team member to advance from each of individual "battles" into the first live round. Within that first live round, the surviving four acts from each team again compete head-to-head, with public votes determining one of two acts from each team that will advance to the final eight, while the coach chooses which of the remaining three acts comprises the other performer remaining on the team.

In the final phase, the remaining contestants compete against each other in live broadcasts. The television audience and the coaches have equal say 50/50 in deciding who moves on to the final 4 phase. With one team member remaining for each coach, the (final 4) contestants compete against each other in the finale with the outcome decided solely by public vote. The winner receives a record deal with Universal Republic.

== Coaches and hosts ==
Chilean singers Nicole and Álvaro López, were joined by Puerto Rican singer Luis Fonsi and Italian-born Franco Simone as coaches for season one with Sergio Lagos taking on the responsibilities of hosting with Jean Philippe Cretton, who served as the backstage and social networking correspondent. After the season finale, Franco Simone went on saying that the production went against him and his team members in favor of the other coaches, subsequently letting him being replaced by Spanish singer Ana Torroja in the second season, alongside returning coaches Nicole, Lopez and Fonsi. Lagos and Cretton also returned to their respective positions.

=== Coaches ===
Season	Host		Coaches			
1	(Chile) Sergio Lagos	(Chile) Jean Philippe Cretton	(Puerto Rico) Luis Fonsi	(Chile) Nicole	(Italy) Franco Simone	(Chile) Álvaro López
2	(Chile) Sergio Lagos	(Chile) Jean Philippe Cretton	(Puerto Rico) Luis Fonsi	(Chile) Nicole	(Spain) Ana Torroja	(Chile) Álvaro López
3	(Chile) Julián Elfenbein	—N/a	(Chile) Beto Cuevas	(Mexico) Yuri	(Cuba) Gente de Zona	(Chile) Cami
4	(Chile) Julián Elfenbein	(Chile) Diana Bolocco	(Venezuela) Puma	(Chile) Beto Cuevas	(Chile) Francisca Valenzuela	(Puerto Rico) Prince Royce

Notes

Coaches

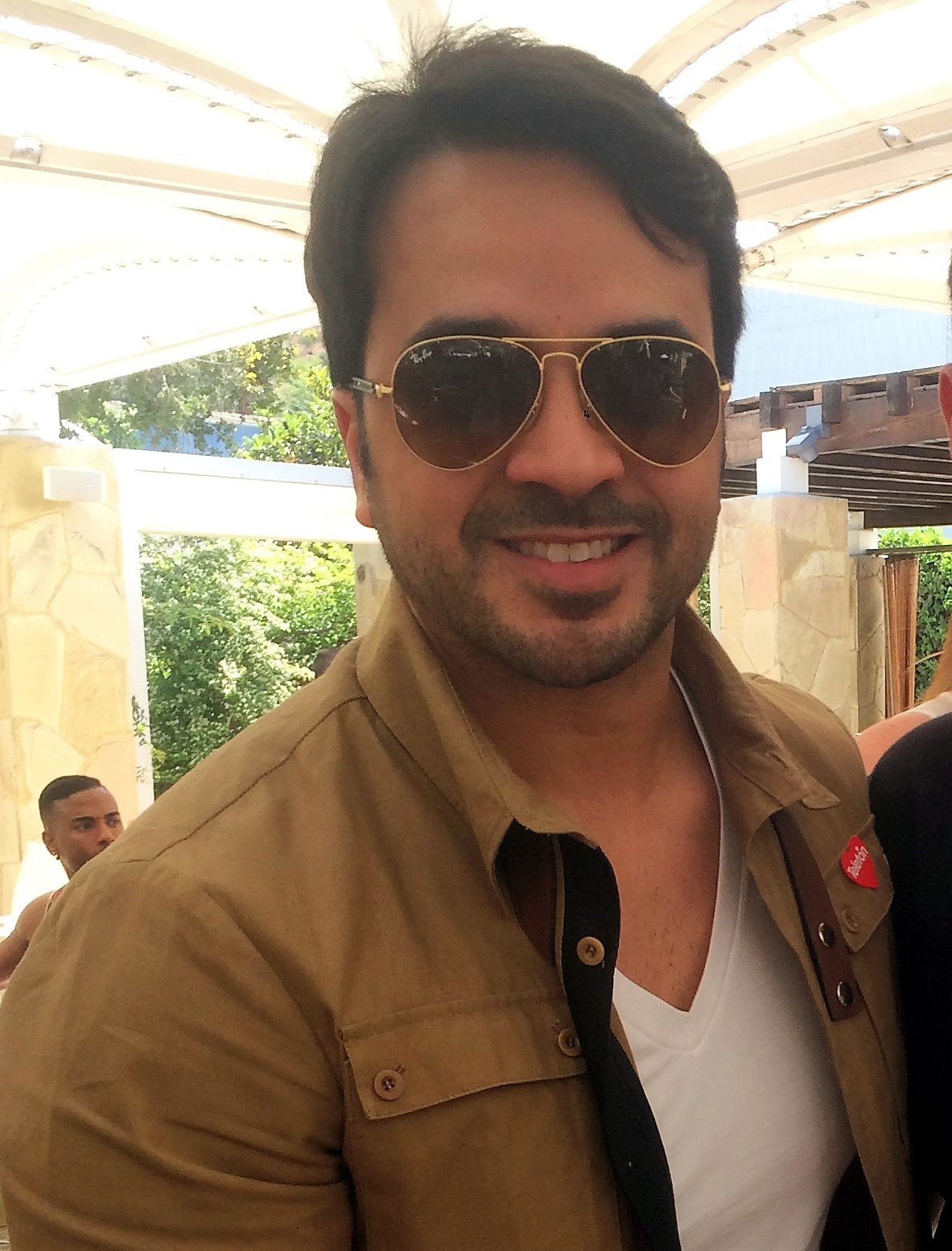
Luis Fonsi (2015–2016)

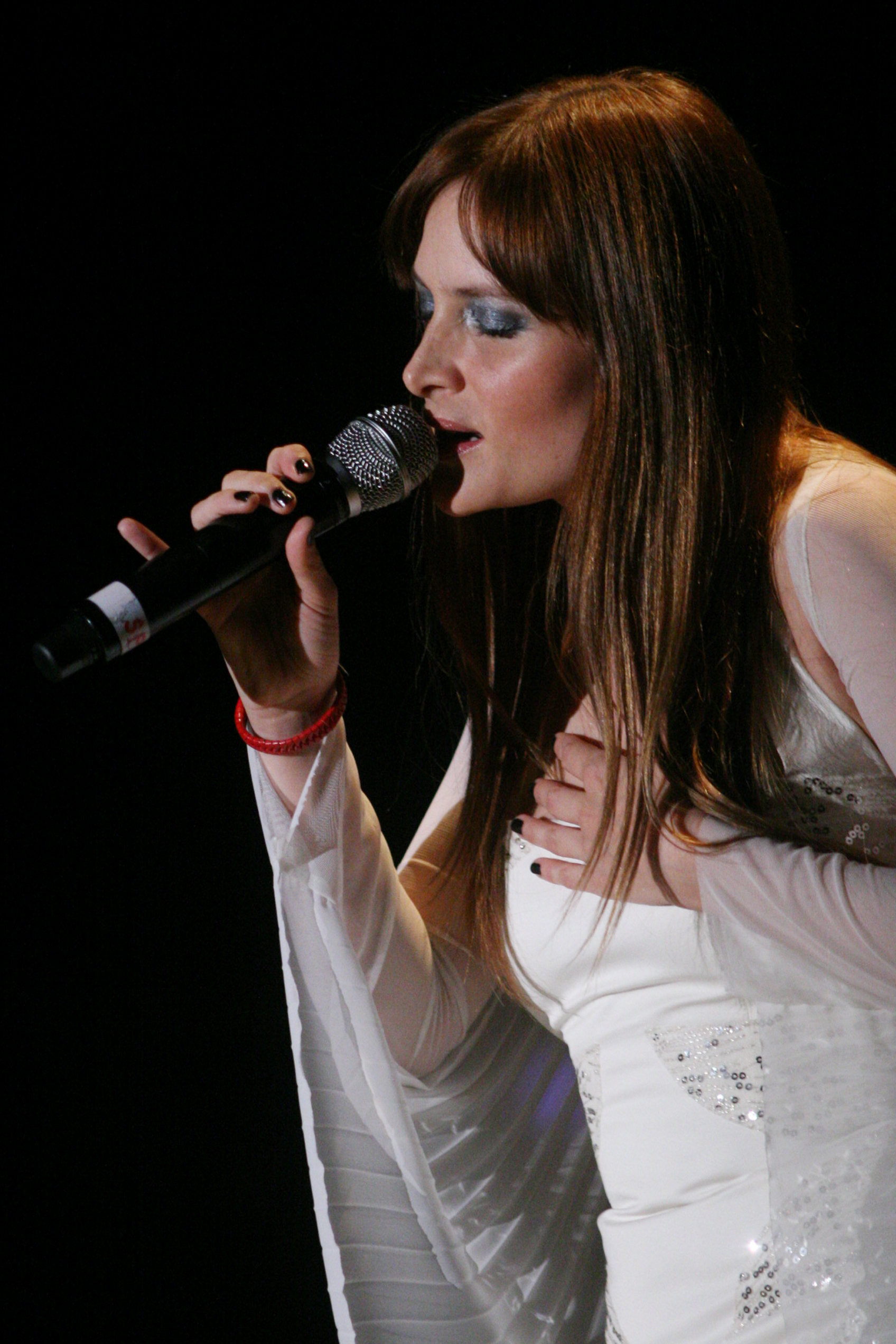
Nicole (2015–2016)

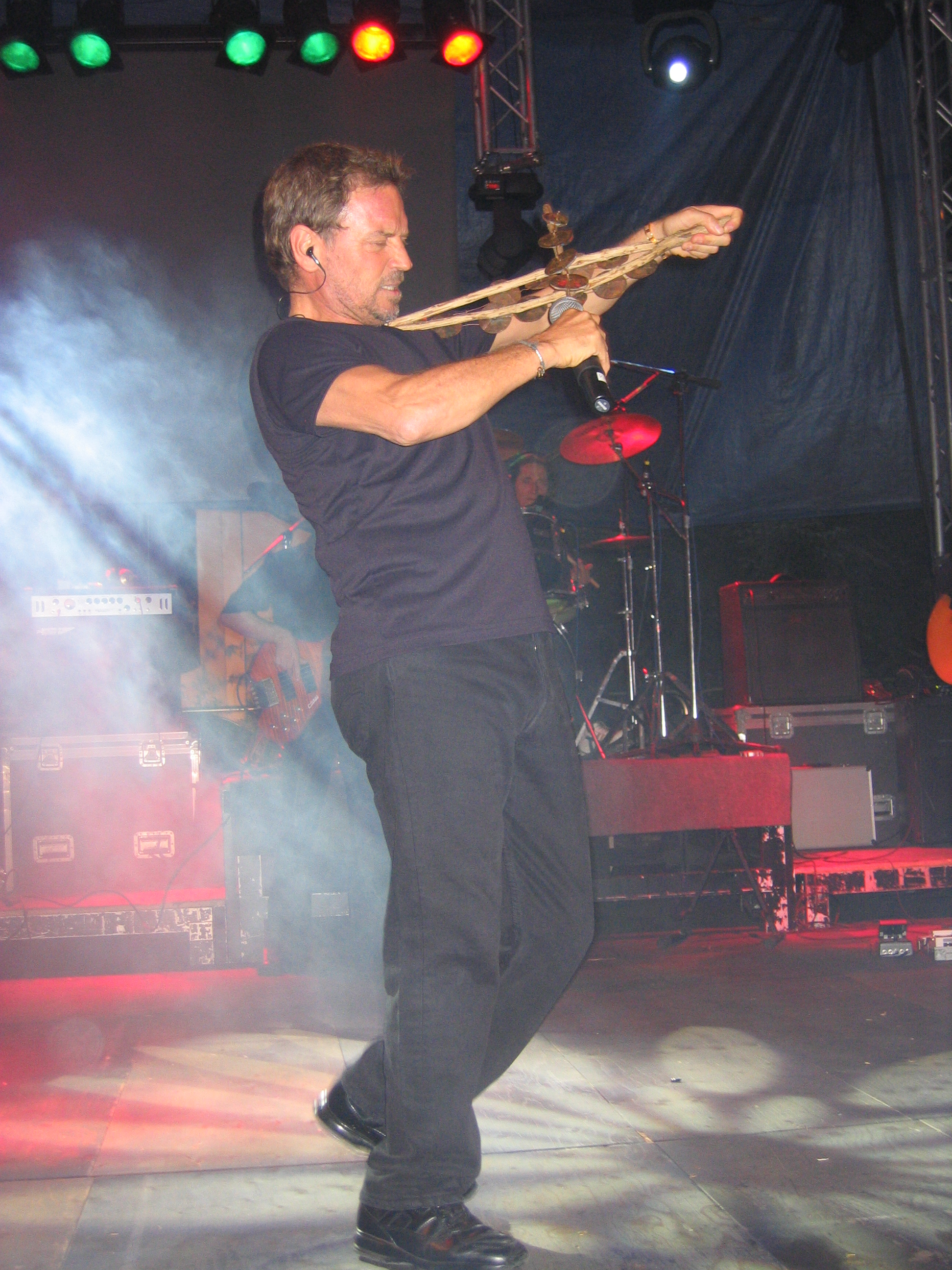
Franco Simone (2015)

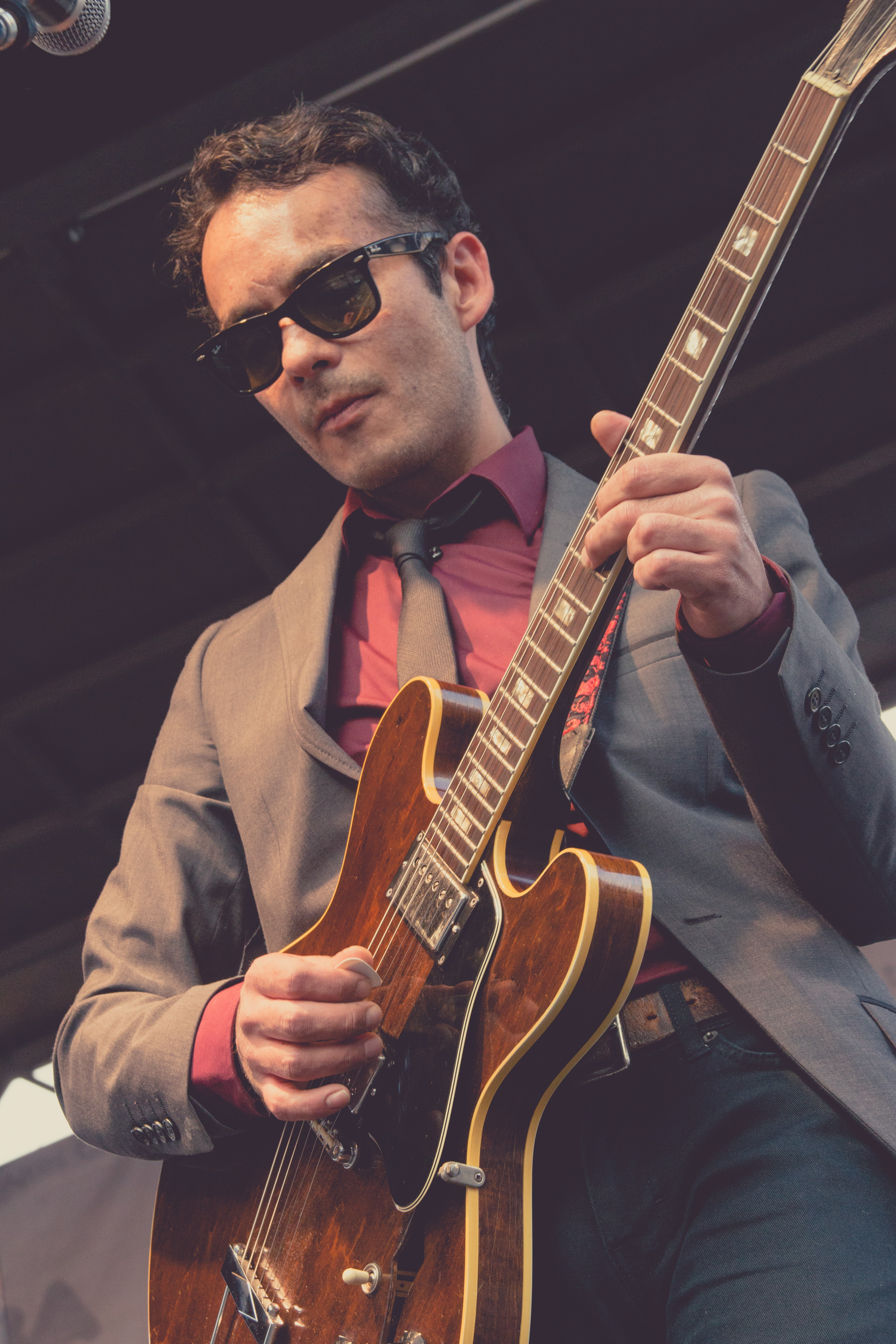
Álvaro López (2015–2016)

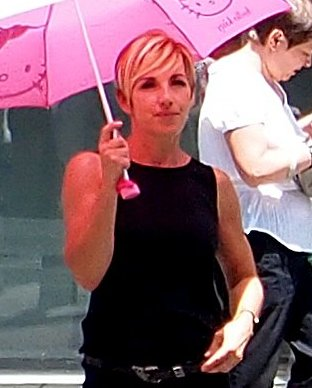
Ana Torroja (2016)

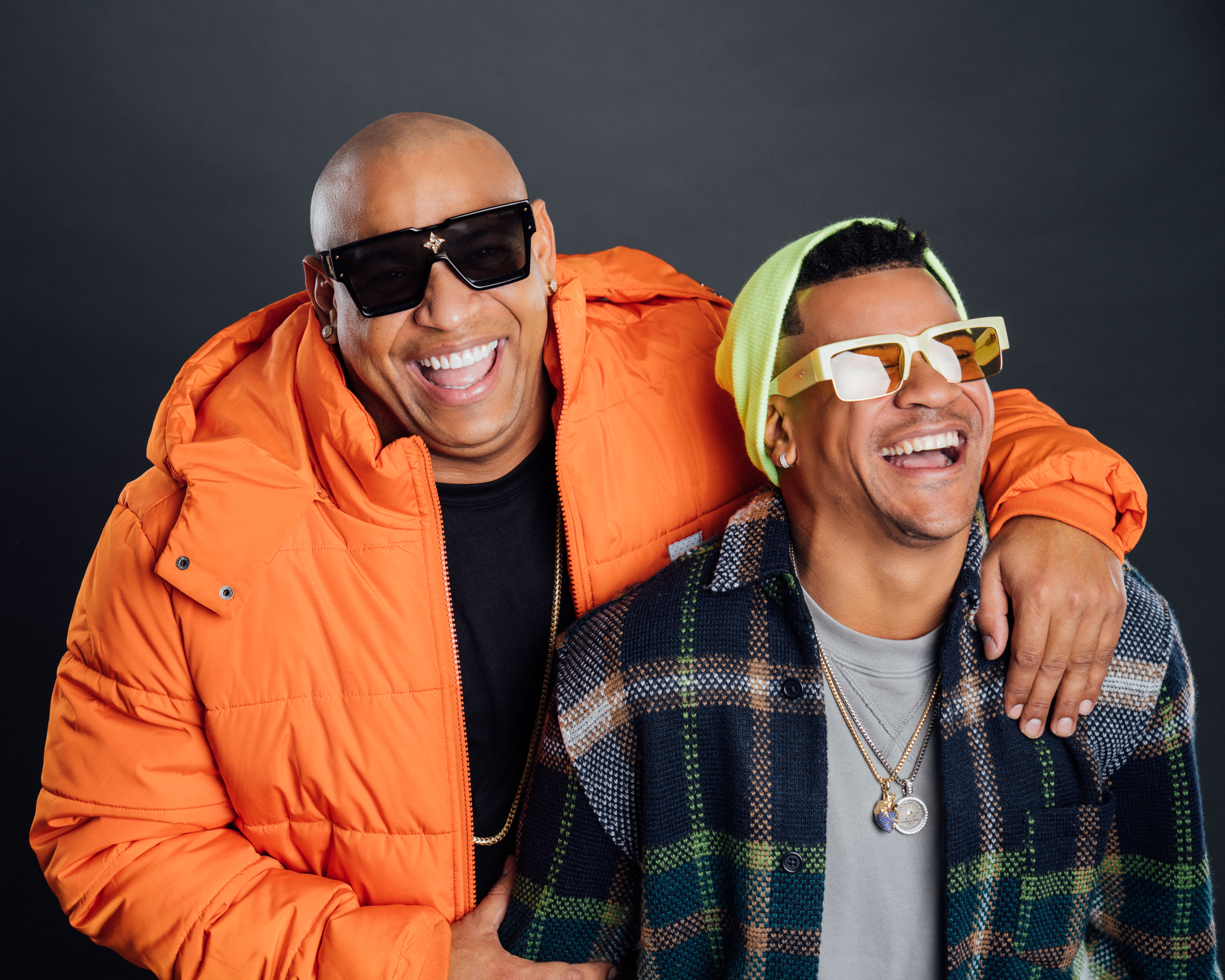
Gente de Zona (2022)

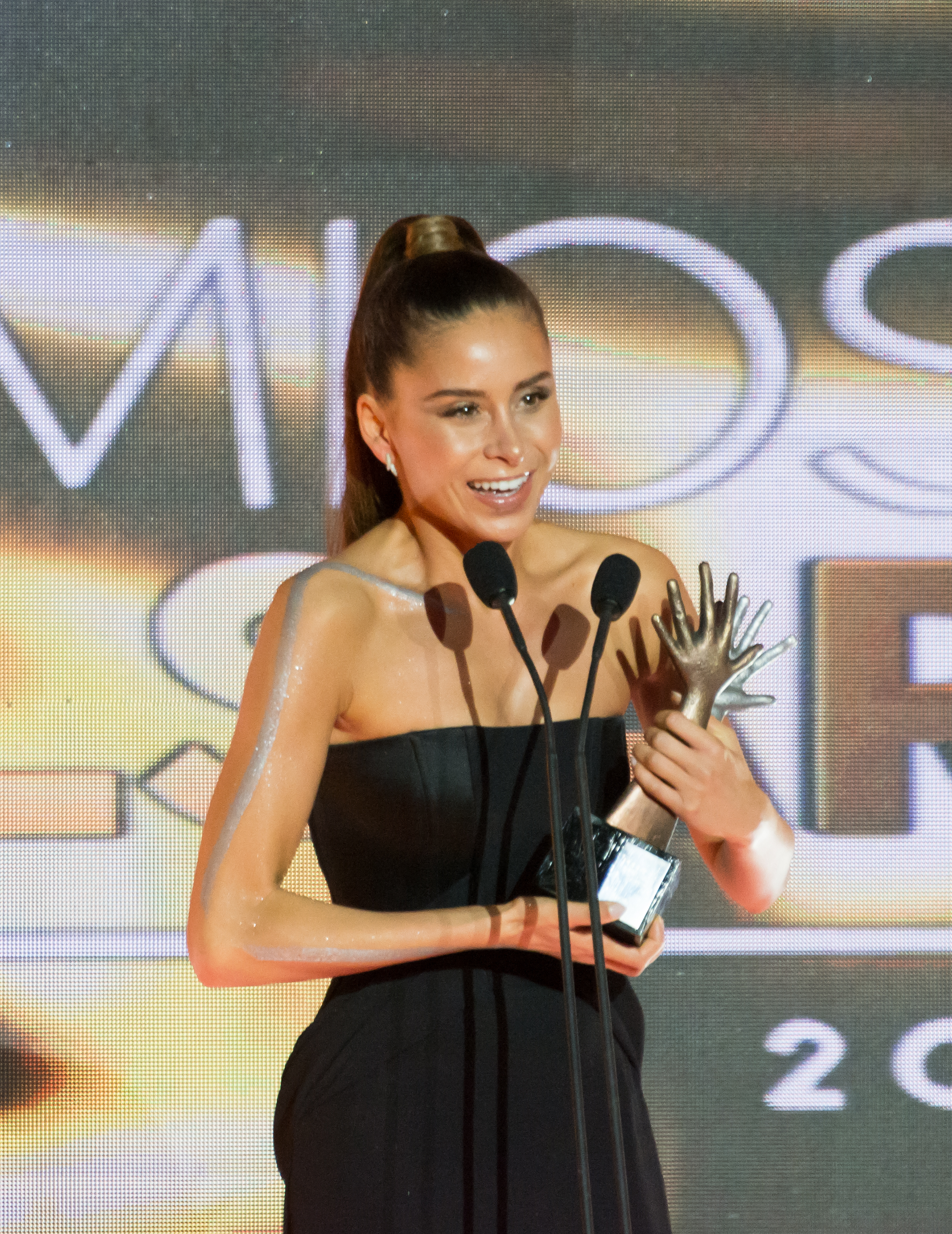
Cami (2022)

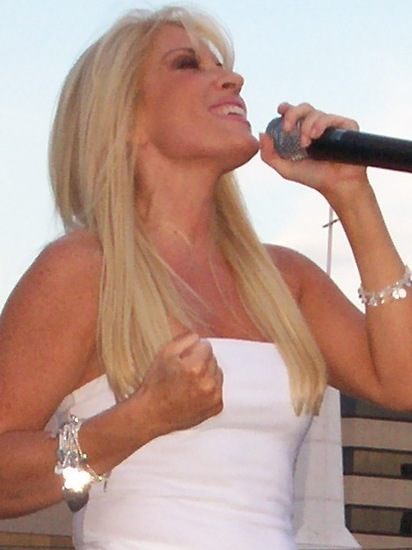
Yuri (2022)

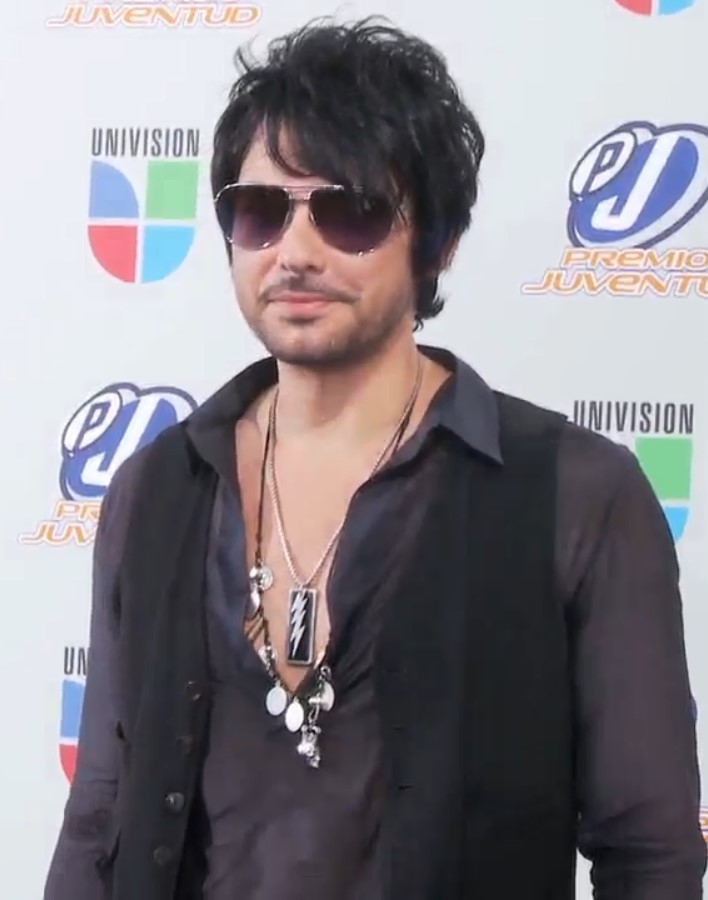
Beto Cuevas (2022–2023)

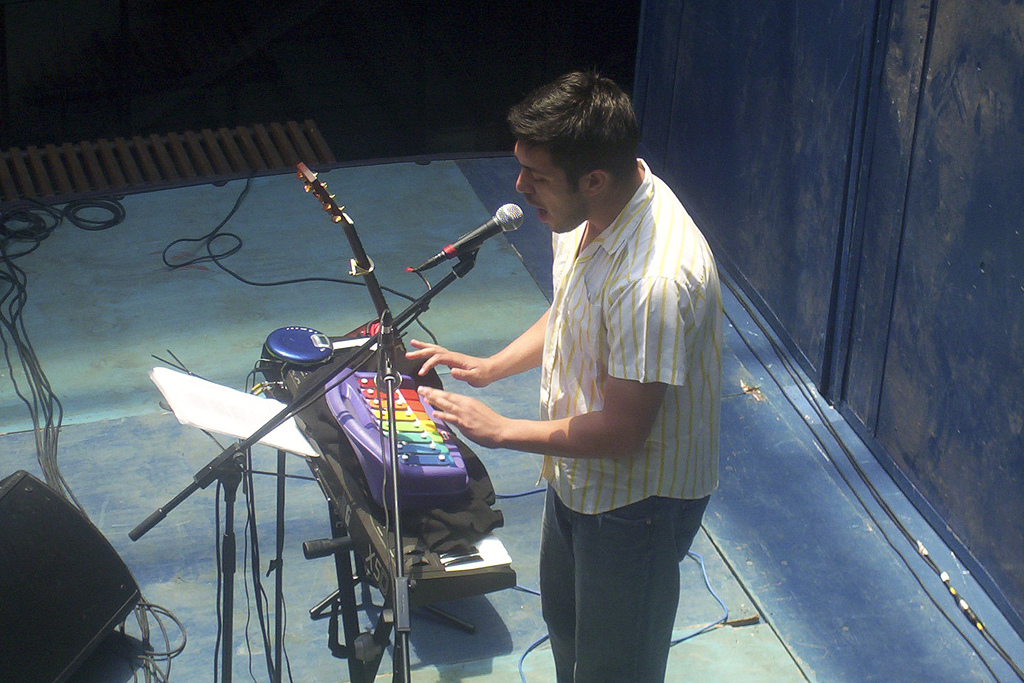
Gepe (comeback stage, 2022)

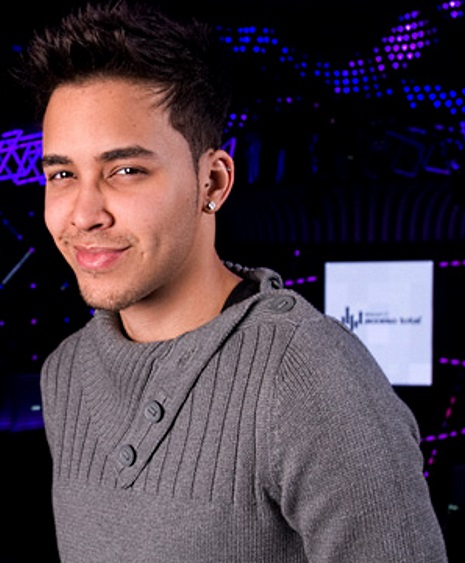
Prince Royce (2023)

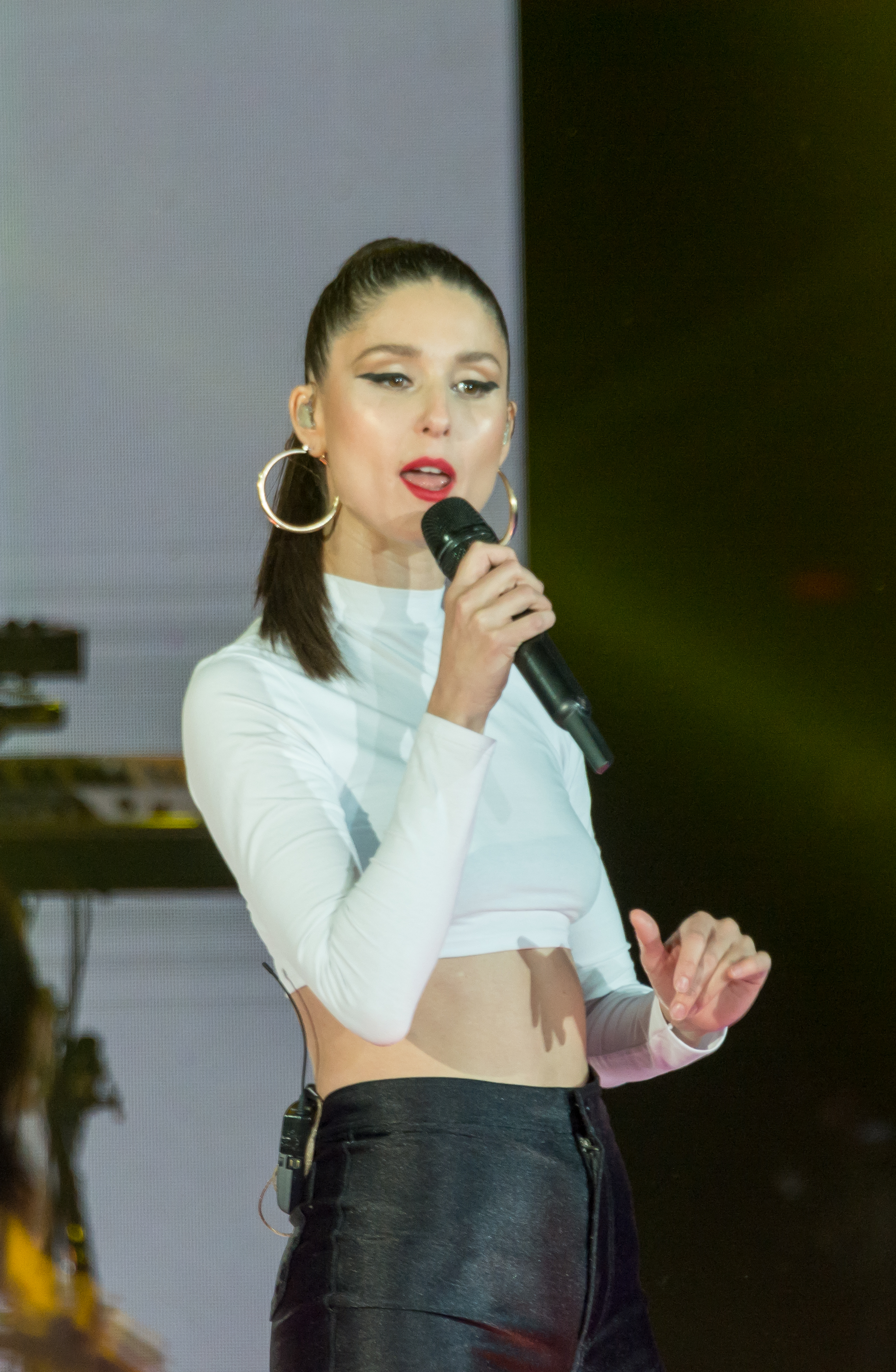
Francisca Valenzuela (2023)

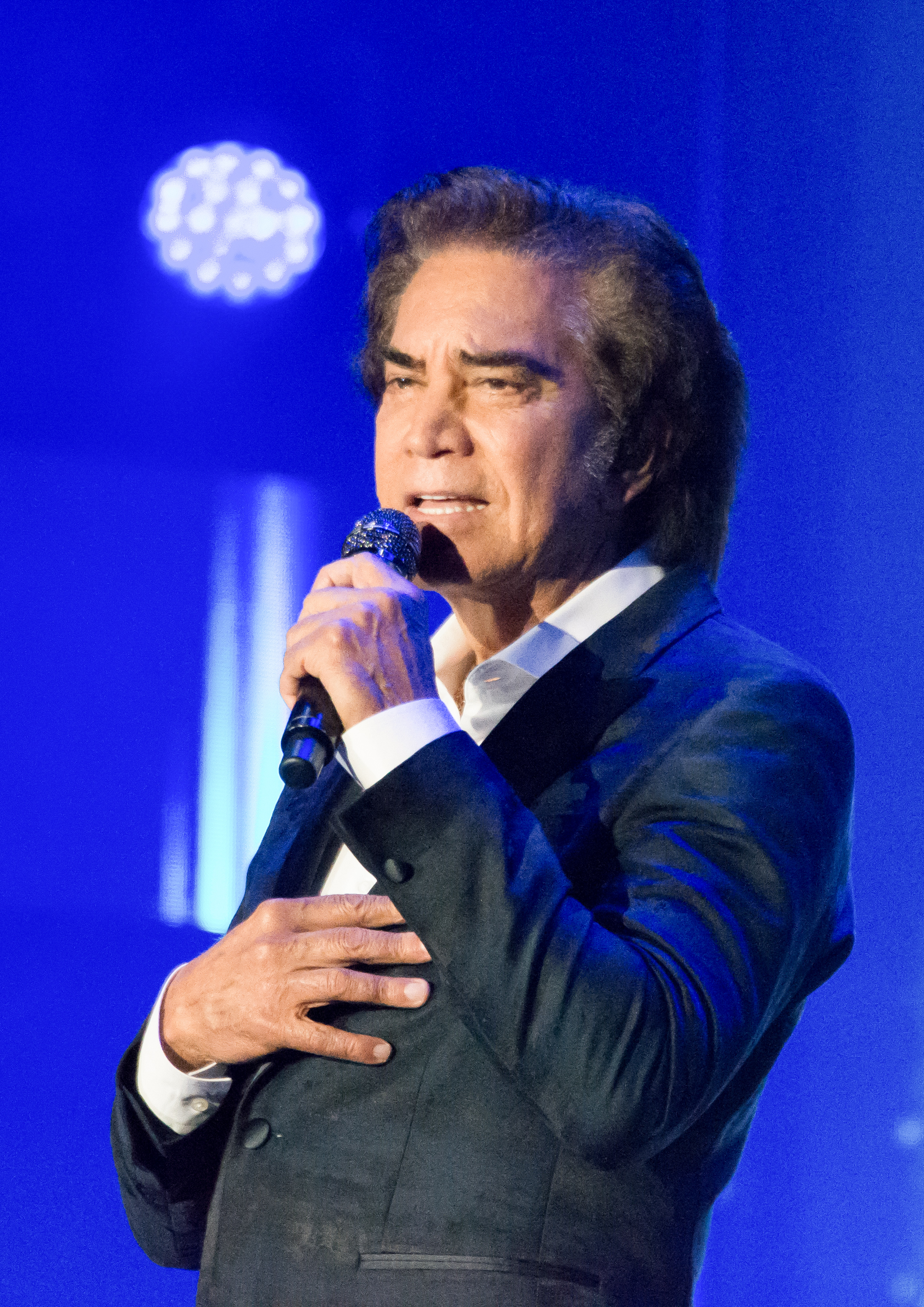
José Luis Rodríguez (2023)

== Coaches' teams ==
- Final contestant first listed. Winners are in bold, other finalists in italic, and eliminated contestants in small font.
- Winning coach and contestant
- Runner-up coach and contestant
- 3rd place coach and contestant
- 4th place coach and contestant

Season	Coaches and their finalists			
1	Luis Fonsi	Nicole	Franco Simone	Álvaro López
1	Camila Gallardo; Josefa Serrano; Alejando Zapata	**Luis Pedraza**; Martina Petric; Sebastián Zerené	Charly Benavente; Karin Cáceres; Luis Layseca	Trygve Nystoyl; Astrid Veas; Consuelo Cifre
2	Luis Fonsi	Nicole	Ana Torroja	Álvaro López
2	Lucas Piraino; Nicole Davidovich; Luis Zapata; María Jesús Parra	Héctor Palma; Caroline Toledo; Esteban Aspée; Nicolás Vergara	**Javiera Flores**; Gloria López; Sergio Lagos; Anselmo Sandoval	Gonzalo Sorich; Claribel Enríquez; Manuela Paz; María Elena Carvallo
3	Beto Cuevas	Yuri	Gente de Zona	Cami
3	Jordan Matamala; Florencia Santibañez; Belén Robert; Jorge Imhoff; Óscar Obando	Isaias Morales; Ignacio Araneda; Carla Pérez; Elizabeth Moya	**Pablo Rojas**; Thayz Torres; Paulo Zieballe; Christian Aranda	Roberto Lobos; Enzo Ferrada; Valeria Fernández; Óscar Rosas
4	José Luis Rodríguez	Beto Cuevas	Francisca Valenzuela	Prince Royce
4	**Hadonais Nieves**; William & Roberto; Alexis Salinas; Dany Álvarez; Stanley Weissohn	Marcelo Durán; Antonia Núñez; Celene Painemal; Savka Gómez; Zoylin Ybarra	Catalina Campos; Tito Rey; Francisco Aleuy; Tayra Hucke; Alejandra Moraga	Alexis Vásquez; Camilo Peralta; Alexia Valech; Alondra Bravo; Christopher & Fabián

== Series overview ==
The Voice Chile series overview
Season	Aired	Winner	Runner-up	Third place	Fourth place	Winning coach	Presenters	Coaches (chairs' order)			
Season	Aired	Winner	Runner-up	Third place	Fourth place	Winning coach	Presenters	1	2	3	4
1	2015	Luis Pedraza	Camila Gallardo	Charly Benavente	Trygve Nystoyl	Nicole	Sergio Lagos	Fonsi	Nicole	Franco	Álvaro
2	2016	Javiera Flores	Héctor Palma	Lucas Piriano	Gonzalo Sorich	Ana Torroja	Sergio Lagos	Fonsi	Nicole	Ana	Álvaro
3	2022	Pablo Rojas	Jordan Matamala	Roberto Lobos	Isaías Morales	Gente de Zona	Julian Elfenbein	Beto	Yuri	GDZ	Cami
4	2023	Hadonais Nieves	Marcelo Durán	Alexis Vásquez	Catalina Campos	José Luis Rodríguez	Elfenbein, Diana Bolocco	Puma	Beto	Fran	Royce
