= The Wave (2025 film) =

2025 musical film by Sebastián Lelio

- Theatrical release poster
- Spanish: La ola
- Directed by: Sebastián Lelio
- Written by: Sebastián Lelio; Manuela Infante; Josefina Fernández; Paloma Salas
- Produced by: Juan de Dios Larraín; Pablo Larraín; Rocío Jadue; Sebastián Lelio
- Starring: Daniela López; Avril Aurora; Lola Bravo; Paulina Cortés
- Cinematography: Benjamín Echazarreta
- Edited by: Soledad Salfate
- Music by: Matthew Herbert
- Production company: Fábula
- Distributed by: El Camino (Chile); Wolfe Video (United States)
- Release dates: May 16, 2025 (Cannes); August 28, 2025 (Chile)
- Running time: 129 minutes
- Countries: Chile; United States
- Language: Spanish

The Wave (Spanish: La ola) is a 2025 musical drama film directed by Sebastián Lelio, from a screenplay written by Lelio, Manuela Infante, Josefina Fernández and Paloma Salas. Starring Daniela López, Avril Aurora, Lola Bravo and Paulina Cortés, it is loosely inspired by 2018 Chilean feminist protests and strikes.

The film had its world premiere at the Cannes Premiere section of the 2025 Cannes Film Festival, on May 16, 2025.

The Wave was Lelio's final film before his death in November 2026.

== Cast ==
- Daniela López as Julia
- Avril Aurora as Luna
- Lola Bravo as Rafa
- Paulina Cortés as Tamara
- Claudia Cabezas as Julia's mother
- Néstor Cantillana as Pedro
- Elvira López as lawyer
- Amalia Kassai as Paz
- Luis Dubó as don Cantarino
- Susana Hidalgo as Piedad
- Lucas Saéz Collins as Max
- Mariana Loyola as Max's mother
- Álvaro Espinoza as Max's father
- Renata González Spralja as Octavia
- Amparo Noguera as Raquel
- Tamara Acosta as secretary
- Antonia Santa María as journalist
- Florencia Berner as Leo
- Valentina Nassar as Francisca
- Germán Pinilla as Alejo
- Roberto Villena as student

== Production ==
Principal photography had wrapped in April 2024, after filming on location for nine weeks. Accompanying the announcement of the production wrap, it was reported that newcomers Daniela López, Avril Aurora, Lola Bravo and Paulina Cortés had joined the cast.

== Music ==
The film features seventeen national musicians, including Ana Tijoux, Camila Moreno, Javiera Parra, Evelyn Cornejo, Niña Tormenta, Chini.png and Natalia Contesse who collaborated to write the musical composition alongside the film's composer, Matthew Herbert.

== Release ==
The Wave had its world premiere at the 2025 Cannes Film Festival in the Cannes Premiere section, on 16 May 2025.

It will compete for IFFI ICFT UNESCO Gandhi Medal at the 56th International Film Festival of India in November 2025.

Distributed by El Camino, it is scheduled to be released commercially on August 28, 2025, in Chilean theaters.

On September 6, 2025 The Wave made its United States premiere as Closing Night Selection at NVISON Latino Film & Music Festival in Miami.

In December 2025, Wolfe Video announced their acquisition of North American distribution rights to the film with a plans for a theatrical release in 2026.

== Reception ==
Guy Lodge of Variety assessed that despite the film being "composed and choreographed with energetic aplomb", the two-hour-plus runtime "exposes the repetitiveness of its rhetoric and the sparseness of its drama".
