= Maldita =

Studio album by Francisca Valenzuela
- Released: July 30, 2026
- Length: 30:41
- Language: Spanish
- Label: Frantastic
- Producers: Francisca Valenzuela; Francisco Victoria

Francisca Valenzuela chronology
| Adentro (2023) | Maldita (2026) |

Singles from Maldita
- 1. "Bugambilia" Released: April 9, 2026; 2. "Malacara" Released: May 28, 2026; 3. "SOS" Released: July 8, 2026

Maldita (lit. 'Cursed') is the seventh studio album by the Chilean-American singer-songwriter Francisca Valenzuela. It was released on July 30, 2026, under Valenzuela's own independent record label, Frantastic Records.

The album tackles Valenzuela own experience within postpartum and feelings of isolation following the birth of her first child. It contains twelve tracks, including the singles "Bugambilia", "Malacara" and "SOS".

== Background ==
Maldita marks Valenzuela's first studio album in three years, following the release of her sixth studio album, Adentro in 2023, which received critical acclaim and earned nominations for Best Pop/Rock Album at the Latin Grammys Awards, and for Album of the Year at both the Premios Pulsar and Musa Awards. Between the two albums, Valenzuela released several standalone singles and became a mother for the first time with her partner, Chilean journalist Daniel Matamala.

According Valenzuela, the album reflects her intention to "challenge conventional expectations surronunding motherhood", and hopes that the songs "offer companionship and a different perspective." She explained the album title, Maldita (Spanish for Cursed) to El Mostrador, saying that she felt: "Cursed because i'm supposed to be happy, and I'm not. Cursed because if i say something. I'll be judged and burned at the stake because this is considered unacceptable, because it's the darkness within what is supposed to be the brightest moment in a woman's life".

The album was inspired by Valenzuela's experiences during the postpartum period and explores themes such as the stigma of post-partum, the idealization of motherhood, and the emotional challenges of becoming a first-time parent. In an interview with Excélsior, Valenzuela said that the project was conceived as a response to what she described as "the cultural romanticization of motherhood", arguing that prevailing social expectations often leave little room to acknowledge its complexities and difficulties, stating that mothers who experience emotional struggles are frequently judged as "bad mothers". Valenzuela said she hoped the album would resonate with other women experiencing the postpartum, adding: "My dream is for this album to accompany other women and that it becomes a work of art just like the ones i listened during my own postpartum, which made me feel deeply supported and seen".

== Promotion ==
=== Singles ===
The album's lead single "Bugambilia", was released on April 9, 2026. with an accompanying music video being released at the same day. It was followed by a second single titled, "Malacara" on May 28, and a third single "SOS", which was released on July 8, 2026, respectively.

=== Tour ===
To promote the album, Valenzuela is set to embark on the Maldita Tour, which is scheduled to begin on August 13, 2026, with dates across the United States, Mexico and Chile.

== Track listing ==
All music and lyrics are written by Francisca Valenzuela and Francisco Victoria, except "Malacara" (music by Valenzuela, Victoria, and Roberta Nikita; lyrics by Valenzuela) and Bugambilia (lyrics by Valenzuela). All tracks are arranged by Marcelo Wilson, except "Malacara" and "Bugambilia".

Maldita track listing
| No. | Title | Length |
|---|---|---|
| 1. | "Maldita" | 2:41 |
| 2. | "SOS" | 2:25 |
| 3. | "Malacara" | 2:44 |
| 4. | "Soy Tu Fan" | 2:47 |
| 5. | "Levemente Infeliz" | 2:33 |
| 6. | "Debería Tomar Más Agua" | 2:25 |
| 7. | "Extracción" | 1:31 |
| 8. | "Bugambilia" | 3:04 |
| 9. | "No Te Aburras de Mí" | 2:26 |
| 10. | "Nací Necesitándote" | 2:46 |
| 11. | "Año Uno" | 2:07 |
| 12. | "Komorebi" | 3:06 |
| Total length: | | 30:41 |

== Release history ==
Release dates and formats for Maldita
| Region | Date | Format(s) | Label | Ref. |
|---|---|---|---|---|
| Various | July 30, 2026 | Vinyl; digital download; streaming | Frantastic Records | |

== See also ==
- List of 2026 albums
