= Adentro (Francisca Valenzuela album) =

Studio album by Francisca Valenzuela
- Released: August 18, 2023
- Genres: Alternative rock; pop rock
- Length: 37:02
- Language: Spanish
- Label: Frantastic Records
- Producers: Francisca Valenzuela; Francisco Victoria

Francisca Valenzuela chronology
Vida tan Bonita (2022)	Adentro (2023)	Maldita (2026)

Singles from Adentro
- 1. "¿Dónde Se Llora Cuando Se Llora?" Released: May 26, 2023; 2. "Nada Para Ti" Released: July 27, 2023; 3. "Extraño" Released: October 12, 2023; 4. "Adentro" Released: January 25, 2024; 5. "Continente" Released: March 21, 2024; 6. "Juan" Released: May 23, 2024

Adentro (Inside) is the sixth studio album by Chilean-American singer-songwriter Francisca Valenzuela. It was released on August 18, 2023, under Valenzuela's own independent record label, Frantastic Records. The album consists of eleven tracks, including the singles "¿Dónde Se Llora Cuando Se Llora?" and "Déjalo Ir". Adentro was met with critical acclaim upon its release, earning nominations for Album of the Year at the Premios MUSA and the Pulsar Awards. As well, a Latin Grammy Award nomination for Best Pop/Rock Album.

== Background ==
Adentro was produced and co-written by Francisca Valenzuela alongside Francisco Victoria, with the exception of the tracks "Extraño" and "Continente" which were purely written and produced by Valenzuela. The record tells the break-up of a longtime relationship like a personal diary. According Valenzuela the sound of the record is more organic, and reminiscent of her early work, with the accompanying of the piano as the main instrument.

== Promotion ==
=== Singles ===
Six singles were released to promote the album. The album lead single, "¿Dónde Se Llora Cuando Se Llora?", was released on May 26. The single was met critical acclaim and earned Valenzuela's second Latin Grammy Award nomination for Best Pop/Rock Song. Its music video was released on May 31, and it was directed by Alba Gaviraghi.

The second single, "Nada Para Ti" featuring guest vocals by Mexican singer Ximena Sariñana was released on July 27. A music video directed by Valenzuela was released the day after the single release.

The third single "Extraño", written and produced by Valenzuela, was released on October 12. Meanwhile, its music video, directed by Camila Grandi, premiered on October 19.

The title track, "Adentro" was chosen as the album fourth single, and was released on January 25, 2024, alongside its music video which was directed by Camila Grandi.

The fifth single was "Continente", the self-written track was released as a single, alongside its music video, on March 21.

The sixth single was "Juan" and was released on May 23. The music video was released on May 27. It was directed by Felipe Prado and Valenzuela, and featured cameos of Jean Philippe Cretton, Fabrizio Copano, Tomás González, Young Cister, Eyal Meyer, Matías Assler, Diego Urrutia, Cristóbal Orozco, Valito Trujillo, Polimá Westcoast, Francisco Zudelia, Adan Jodorowsky, Gil Cerezo, Francisco Victoria, Esteman, Marco Mares, Pablo Holman, and Meme del real, playing different versions of "Juan".

==== Promotional singles ====
"Jugando con Fuego" served as a promotional single with an accompanying official lyric video being released on April 19, 2024. The second promotional single was "Dejalo Ir" which was nominated for a Latin Grammy Award for Best Alternative Song, its official music video was released on July 27, 2024. "Lo Nuestro Nadie Puede Borrarlo" served as the third and final promotional single of the record, with its official music video dropping on September 8, 2024.

=== Tour ===
To promote the album, Valenzuela embarked on the Adentro Tour, which started on August 21 with dates across the United States, Mexico and Chile.

== Reception ==
Adentro was met with widespread critical acclaim, with many critics dubbing it as Valenzuela best work to date. Many praised the lyrical content for being "raw", "honest", and "vulnerable".

Marcelo Contreras for La Tercera praised the intimacy of the record, and praised Valenzuela's piano instrumentation. He described the production as "more direct" and that "some pieces strike fresh as if they were live shots of the band just picking up the instruments, with pleasant results." Rebeca Perez for Rockeros VIP stated that the record is "a life diary made into music that reveals the reflective and lyrical capacity of Francisca Valenzuela." Rolling Stone said that Valenzuela, "came with an introspective album that takes us on a journey through all the stages of a breakup." which "prompted her to free herself from a prison of repressed emotions", and included Adentro on their best Latin albums (so far) mid-year list at #20, and then, on their year-end list for "The Best Latin Albums of 2023" at #31. Variety named Adentro one of the "10 Best Overlooked Latin Albums of 2023.", praising Valenzuela artistry, and vocal performance.

=== Year-end list ===
Critics year-end list for Adentro
Publication	Accolade	Rank	Ref.
Rolling Stone en Español	The Best Latin Albums of 2023	31	
Variety	The 10 Best Overlooked Latin Albums of 2023	Listed	

=== Accolades ===
Adentro alongside several tracks achieved nominations from different awards associations. At the 2024 Pulsar Awards ceremony, Adentro was nominated for Album of the Year, meanwhile the album tracks "¿Dondé Se Llora Cuando Se Llora?", and the title track "Adentro", earned nominations in the Song of the Year, and Record of the Year categories, respectively.

On the 2023 Premios MUSA, Adentro was nominated for Album of the Year, as well the album singles "¿Dondé Se Llora Cuando Se Llora?" was nominated for Song of the Year and Video of the Year, and her song with Ximena Sariñana "Nada Para Ti" was nominated for Collaboration of the Year.

At the 2023 Latin Grammy Awards ceremony, Valenzuela earned her second Latin Grammy nomination for Best Pop/Rock Song with the track "¿Dondé Se Llora Cuando Se Llora?", marking her first nomination in nine years since 2015. The following year at the 2024 ceremony, Valenzuela got two nominations with the album track "Dejalo Ir" earning a nomination for Best Alternative Song, meanwhile the album was nominated for Best Pop/Rock Album.

List of awards and nominations received by Adentro
Awards	Category	Result	Ref.
Latin Grammy Awards	Best Pop/Rock Album	Nominated	
Pulsar Awards	Album of the Year	Nominated	
Premios MUSA	Album of the Year	Nominated	

== Track listing ==
All music is composed by Francisca Valenzuela and Francisco Victoria.

No.	Title	Lyrics	Length
1.	"Adentro"	Francisca Valenzuela; Francisco Victoria	3:18
2.	"¿Dónde Se Llora Cuando Se Llora?"	Valenzuela; Victoria	3:20
3.	"Nada Para Ti" (with Ximena Sariñana)	Valenzuela; Victoria	3:56
4.	"Extraño"	Valenzuela	3:49
5.	"Ardiendo"	Valenzuela; Victoria	3:15
6.	"Continente"	Valenzuela	3:09
7.	"Jugando Con Fuego"	Valenzuela; Victoria	3:18
8.	"Juan"	Valenzuela; Victoria	3:09
9.	"Déjalo Ir"	Valenzuela; Victoria	3:34
10.	"Ámame Un Poquito Más"	Valenzuela; Victoria	3:01
11.	"Lo Nuestro Nadie Puede Borrarlo"	Valenzuela; Victoria	3:07
Total length:			37:02

== Personnel ==
Credits:

- Francisca Valenzuela — lead vocals, performer, songwriter, executive producer (all tracks)
- Francisco Victoria — performer (1–3,5,7-11), songwriter (1–3,5,7-11), executive producer (1–3,5,7-11)
- Ximena Sariñana — guest vocals (3)
- Yani Molina - producer (2)
- Juliana Gattas — backing vocals
- Fer Casillas — backing vocals
- Daniela Spalla — backing vocals

== Release history ==
Release dates and formats for Adentro
Region	Date	Format(s)	Label	Ref.
Various	August 18, 2023	CD; vinyl; digital download; streaming	Frantastic; Records	

== See also ==
- List of 2023 albums
