= Bugambilia (song) =

Single by Francisca Valenzuela

from the album Maldita
- Language: Spanish
- Released: April 9, 2026
- Studio: Romaphonic (Buenos Aires)
- Genre: Alternative pop
- Length: 3:04
- Label: Frantastic
- Songwriters: Francisca Valenzuela; Francisco Victoria
- Producers: Francisca Valenzuela; Francisco Victoria

Francisca Valenzuela singles chronology
"Tira y Afloja (Afuera)" (2025)	"Bugambilia" (2026)	"Malacara" (2026)

Music video
- "Bugambilia" on YouTube

"Bugambilia" (stylized in all caps) is a song by Chilean singer and songwriter Francisca Valenzuela. It was released on April 9, 2026 through Frantastic Records, as the lead single from her seventh studio album, Maldita.

== Background ==
"Bugambilia" was inspired by Valenzuela's personal experience with postpartum and the emotional difficulties that followed the birth of her first child with Chilean journalist Daniel Matamala. It addresses feelings of isolation, guilt, and inadequacy following childbirth. Valenzuela also connected the song's themes to the historical treatment of women who were considered rebellious or hysterical for challenging social expectations. She described its connection to witches and their rebellion against condemnation, as well as the experiences of women who have been misunderstood or abandoned.

The song's title refers to a bougainvillea plant that Valenzuela regularly observed from her window while sitting on her couch during the postpartum period. The flower became associated with this stage of her life, which she described as marked by physical exhaustion and a loss of personal identity.

== Composition ==
"Bugambilia" was written by Valenzuela and Francisco Victoria, who also collaborated on its production. Critics described the track as a piano-driven alternative pop song featuring an orchestral arrangement performed by an eight-piece string ensemble. It sound was characterized as dark, melancholic, and emotionally intense, with the combination of piano and strings creating an unsettling atmosphere that reflects the song's subject matter. Radio Concierto highlighted the contrast between the piano and the string arrangement, describing the resulting atmosphere as intense.

== Music video ==
An official music video directed by Lucas Moreno was released on Valenzuela's YouTube channel on April 9, 2026. A live performance was released on October 13, 2026.

== Reception ==
The song received acclaim from music critics, who praised Valenzuela's vulnerable songwriting and its exploration of a taboo subject. Karen Campos Ojeda of End Sessions described the song as nostalgic and melancholic, praising Valenzuela's expressive vocals for conveying emotion and desperation. Reviewing Maldita for Rockaxis, Raúl Escárate considered "Bugambilia" one of the album's most impactful moments, highlighting how its piano and orchestral arrangements create an almost delirious atmosphere that reinforces the song's sense of disorientation. At the 27th Annual Latin Grammy Awards, the song was nominated for Best Alternative Song, marking Valenzuela's second consecutive nomination in the category and her fifth nomination overall.

Accolades of "Bugambilia"
Organization	Year	Category	Result	Ref.
Latin Grammy Awards	2026	Best Alternative Song	Nominated	

== Personnel ==
Credits adapted from Tidal.

- Francisca Valenzuela — performer, songwriter, producer, pianist
- Francisco Victoria — producer, songwriter
- Marcelo Wilson — arranger
- Karmen Rencar — cello, string ensemble
- Pablo de Nucci — cello, string ensemble
- Matt Colton — mastering engineer
- Nathan Boddy — mixing engineer
- Ariel Lavigna — recording engineer
- Mariano Malamud — viola, string ensemble
- Elizabeth Rodolfi — viola, violin ensemble
- Augusto Sourigues — violin, violin ensemble
- Matias Romero — violin, violin ensemble
- Matias Scheines — violin, violin ensemble
- Natalia Cabello — violin ensemble

== Release history ==
Release dates and formats
Region	Date	Format(s)	Label	Version	Ref.
Various	April 9, 2026	Digital download; streaming	Frantastic Records	Single	
