= Tajo Abierto =

Studio album by Francisca Valenzuela
- Released: September 9, 2014
- Recorded: November 2013–May 2014; Los Angeles, California and Santiago, Chile (at Estudio del Sur studios)
- Genre: Pop, synth-pop, Latin pop
- Length: 46:49 (Standard edition); 47:19 (includes bonus track)
- Label: Frantastic Records, Sin Anestesia
- Producer: Vicente Sanfuentes, Jesse Rogg, Dave Sitek, Áureo Baqueiro, & Francisca Valenzuela

Francisca Valenzuela chronology
Buen Soldado (2011)	Tajo Abierto (2014)	La Fortaleza (2020)

Singles from "Tajo Abierto"
- 1. "Prenderemos fuego al cielo" Released: July 15, 2014; 2. "Armadura" Released: December 10, 2014; 3. "Insulto" Released: May 19, 2015; 4. "Almost Superstars (Spain Only)" Released: June 30, 2015; 5. "Catedral" Released: March 14, 2016; 6. "Estremecer" Released: September 14, 2016

Tajo Abierto ("Open Wound" in English) is the third studio album by Chilean-American singer-songwriter Francisca Valenzuela. The album was released on September 9, 2014, for download (worldwide) and physically in Chile, the United States, Mexico and Spain. The album features 10 Spanish-language songs and 1 English song.

== Production and writing process ==
The pre-production stages for "Tajo Abierto" began at the end of 2012, when Valenzuela began composing new material. Unlike her previous albums which were produced and recorded in Santiago, Chile, she relocated to Los Angeles, California to work on demos at her home and met with producers in early 2013. This is her first album largely recorded outside of Chile. Valenzuela recorded the album with the help of four producers: Vicente Sanfuentes, Jesse Rogg, Dave Sitek and Áureo Baqueiro. Musically, the album is a departure from Valenzuela's earlier jazz and folk influenced sound. She remarked that the writing and production of the album allowed her to explore other genres and leave her comfort zone. She wrote and composed 25 songs for the album and chose 11 for the final track listing. The album was recorded in various home recording studios in Los Angeles, with the exception of one song, "Cuequita del corazón", which Valenzuela recorded in Santiago, Chile with her band and a string quartet at Estudios del Sur. After writing "Cuequita del corazón", Valenzuela remarked that she knew she had to record it immediately with her band in Santiago.

=== Singles ===
- "Prenderemos fuego al cielo", the album's lead single, was released on iTunes worldwide on July 15, 2014. It debuted at #2 on iTunes in Chile. It was also a commercial success, debuting at #9 on Chilean Singles Charts and is her fourth top 10 charting single. A lyric video and music video for the single were also released via her official VEVO channel in July 2014.
- "Armadura", the second official single, an electro-pop song, was released for airplay in Chilean radios on December 10, 2014. The song peaked at number 24 in the official Chilean charts.
- "Insulto", the album's third single was released to Chilean radio on May 19, 2015. The music video premiered on Valenzuela's official YouTube account on that same day. The song is dedicated those who have been discriminated against, neglected or violated because of their gender identity or sexual orientation. One week after the release of the music video, it had more than 100,000 views on YouTube.
- "Almost Superstars", the fourth official single, was released along with the video for the song on June 30, 2015, in Spain. Although the single is planned to be promoted specially in Spain, Valenzuela confirmed on a video that the song can also be promoted in other countries as the fourth single. This song also becomes her first non-Spanish single.
- "Catedral", the fifth official single, was released along with the video for the song on March 14, 2016. The song peaked at number 99 in the official Chilean charts.
- "Estremecer", was released along with the video for the song on September 14, 2016, as the sixth and final single from the album. The song has peaked at number 50 in the official Chilean charts.

== Promotion ==
To promote her upcoming album, Valenzuela played Lollapalooza Festival in Chicago's famous Grant Park on August 1, 2014. She also performed in Oakland and Los Angeles, California later that same month. She embarked on mini tour throughout Spain in early September 2014. She debuted the album in its entirely in Mexico City on September 25, 2014. A tour in Chile, after its official presentation, was given for November 2014. On September 8, 2014, one day before its official release, the Latin American media site, Terra and Spanish-language online music magazine, Noisey by Vice, exclusively streamed the entire album. For the US iTunes store, the song, "Armadura", was offered as an exclusive free download for the "Single of the Week" on September 8, 2014. "Estremecer" was the free "Single of the Week" for iTunes in Mexico, and "Perfume de tu Piel" was the "Single of the Week" for iTunes in Spain.

== Track listing ==
All tracks are written by Francisca Valenzuela.

No.	Title	Length
1.	"Prenderemos fuego al cielo"	4:29
2.	"No Esperen Mi Regreso"	4:31
3.	"Perfume de Tu Piel"	3:55
4.	"Siempre Eres Tú'"	4:49
5.	"Catedral"	4:29
6.	"Almost Superstars"	3:57
7.	"Estremecer"	3:49
8.	"Armadura"	4:07
9.	"Insulto"	4:23
10.	"Cuequita del corazón"	4:10
11.	"Tajo Abierto"	4:10

iTunes bonus track
No.	Title	Length
1.	Untitled (Acoustic version)
12.	"Prenderemos fuego al cielo"	5:36

== Release history ==
Country	Date	Label	Format(s)
Chile/United States/Latin America/Spain	September 9, 2014	Frantastic Records, Sin Anestesia	CD, Digital download
