= Prenderemos fuego al cielo =

Single by Francisca Valenzuela

from the album Tajo Abierto
- Released: July 15, 2014
- Recorded: Los Angeles, California
- Genre: Pop, electropop
- Length: 4:29
- Label: Sin Anestecia, Frantastic Music
- Songwriter: Francisca Valenzuela
- Producers: Vicente Sanfuentes, Jesse Rogg, Francisca Valenzuela

Francisca Valenzuela singles chronology
"Buen Solado" (2012)	"Prenderemos fuego al cielo" (2014)

"Prenderemos fuego al cielo" is the first single from Tajo Abierto, the third studio album by American-born Chilean singer-songwriter Francisca Valenzuela. The song was released on July 15, 2014 in United States and Chile in digital format on iTunes.

== Background ==
Valenzuela wrote the single in mid-2013 on piano before learning to use special software to achieve the song's electropop synthesized beats. She revealed that the song was most "danceable" on her album because it incorporated new arrangements and noted that the single also marked a stylistic change in her career. The single was recorded in Los Angeles, California, where Valenzuela had relocated in order to work on her new album. Vicente Sanfuentes, Valenzuela, and Grammy nominated producer, Jesse Rogg, co-produced the single.

=== Promotion ===
A lyric video for the single was released on Valenzuela's official VEVO account on July 14, 2014. The single debuted on radio in Chile exclusively for Rock & Pop, one day ahead of its official release.

== Music video ==
The music video was filmed in the desert in Arizona at Antelope Canyon in June 2014. Valenzuela and a crew of eight drove for 8 hours from Los Angeles, California to Arizona. The video was filmed in one day, using only natural light. It was released via Valenzuela's official website on July 22, 2014.

== Track listing ==
Digital Download Single

1. "Prenderemos fuego al cielo" (Album Version) – 4:29

== Release history and radio add dates ==
=== Release history ===
Region	Date	Format
United States	July 15, 2014	Digital download
Chile	July 15, 2014	Digital download

=== Radio add dates ===
Region	Date	Format
Chile	July 14, 2014	Mainstream airplay
