= Francisca Valenzuela =

Chilean-American musician (born 1987)

- Valenzuela at the 2026 Latin Grammy Awards
- Born: Francisca Valenzuela Méndez; March 17, 1987 (age 39); San Francisco, California, U.S
- Citizenship: United States; Chile
- Occupations: Singer; poet; fashion designer
- Years active: 2006–present
- Musical career
- Genres: Pop; jazz; folk; alternative rock
- Instruments: Voice; piano; acoustic guitar; percussion
- Labels: Feria Music; Independent; Frantastic Records
- Website: franciscavalenzuela.com

Francisca Valenzuela Méndez (Latin American Spanish: [fɾanˈsiska βalenˈswela]; born March 17, 1987) is a Chilean-American singer-songwriter, poet, and multi-instrumentalist. Valenzuela was born and raised in San Francisco, California, where she resided until the age of 12, before moving to Santiago, Chile.

She gained public attention in Chile and Latin America following the release of her debut album, Muérdete La Lengua, in 2007. Her second album, Buen Soldado, followed in 2011. Valenzuela has earned both gold and platinum album certifications in Chile. Her third studio album, Tajo Abierto was released in 2014 under her own independent record label Frantastic Records, and earned her first Latin Grammy Award nomination. Valenzuela released her fourth studio album, La Fortaleza, in 2020, and her fifth studio album, Vida tan Bonita in 2022, both records under Sony Music Chile. In 2023, Valenzuela returned to releasing music independently with the single, "¿Dondé Se Llora Cuando Se Llora?", which later earned her a second Latin Grammy Award nomination. The track served as the lead single of Valenzuela' sixth studio album, Adentro, which was released the same year to widespread critical acclaim. She earned several accolades for the album, including a Latin Grammy Award nomination for Best Pop/Rock Album. Her seventh studio album, Maldita was released on 2026 to broad critical acclaim and its lead single "Bugambilia" scored her another Latin Grammy Award nomination.

Described by Rolling Stone as "a Latin American treasure", Valenzuela has been referred as "the Princess of Chilean Pop/rock" by both national and international music publications. (Note: Multiple references:) Her accolades include four Premios Pulsar, one MUSA award, and five Latin Grammy Award nominations. In 2024, Forbes Chile included her in its list of the "50 Most Creative Chileans", recognizing her contributions to music. In 2026, at the Latin Alternative Music Conference, she was honored with the Wonder Women of Latin Music award which highlighted her contributions to the latin music industry, particularly her work promoting women's visibility and gender equality.

== Early life ==
Francisca Valenzuela was born in San Francisco, California to Chilean-born scientists, Pablo Valenzuela Valdés and Bernardita Méndez Velasco. She is the fourth oldest and only daughter of five children. Valenzuela attended Park Day School in nearby Oakland, California. At a very early age, Valenzuela demonstrated an interest in music and began taking music lessons at the age of 7. By age ten, she was playing acoustic guitar and continued studying classical piano. During summer vacations and Christmases, she and her brothers would travel to Santiago, where they would visit relatives.

Eventually, the family would make the permanent move to Santiago, when she was 12. Valenzuela attended Saint George's College, an elite private school in the Vitacura neighbourhood of Santiago. When she moved to Chile, Valenzuela initially struggled with the language barrier, as her native language is English, and had difficulty adjusting to the country's conservative, religious, and societal values compared to her diverse upbringing in California.

After submitting poetry of her own composition to various literary magazines and taking summer poetry courses, Valenzuela's parents helped her submit more material to a friend, who was also a literary critic at Stanford University. Many of her poems were published in the Latin American literary magazine, El Andar. In 2000, she published her first book, Defenseless Waters, featuring a collection of her poems and illustrations. The book is out of print as of 2024. The book featured a foreword by famed Chilean author Isabel Allende. She released her second book, Abejorros/Madurar, which was distributed in Spain and Latin America in 2001. As part of a promotional tour for Defenseless Waters, she brought her guitar and keyboard to venues in northern California, where she gave poetry readings and performed songs of her own composition. Valenzuela is fluent in English and Spanish and often composes in both languages.

== Music career ==
=== 2004–2008: Beginnings and Muérdete la Lengua ===
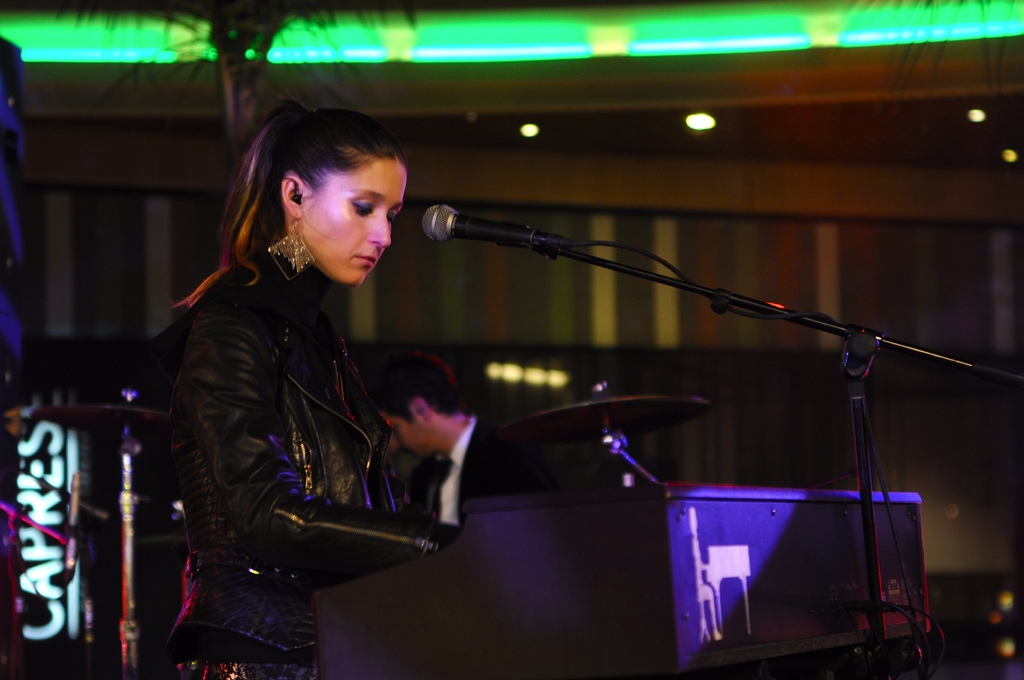
Valenzuela performing at a concert in 2008

Shortly after the release of her first book, Francisca and her family moved to Santiago, Chile when she was 12. While residing in Chile, Francisca took part as singer in school festivals, where she performed her original songs. In 2004, she attended an intensive jazz program at the Berklee College of Music in Boston. She first began looking for a record deal by sending her demos to major record label offices throughout Chile with no success. She performed English-language songs at bars and clubs in Santiago, but eventually began writing and performing in Spanish. After many unsuccessful attempts at signing with a major label, Valenzuela decided to release her music independently in Chile.

In 2006, Valenzuela unofficially released her first solo single, "Peces", which she wrote at age 13 about a boy she liked who did not reciprocate her feelings. Within a few months after its release, "Peces" gained popularity on Chilean radio. "Peces" was recognized by Rolling Stone magazine in Chile, as one of the best 100 songs of the year 2006. Due to the success of her first unofficial single, Valenzuela began recording her debut album in Santiago. Brothers Mauricio and Francisco Durán of Los Bunkers produced the album. In December 2006, she released her second single, "Dulce", which reached number two on Chile's national charts.

To add more achievements to her short musical career, on May 19, 2007, she was invited by Julieta Venegas to open her concert at Teatro Caupolicán. On June 30, 2007, her debut album, Muérdete La Lengua was released in Chile. The Chilean press quickly dubbed her as The Princess of Rock, calling her,"[a] new musical revelation". Soon after its release, the album was certified as Gold in Chile. Valenzuela performed in New York City at the annual LAMC conference in July 2008. This was Valenzuela's first musical exposure in the US and gave her an opportunity to showcase her music outside of Latin America. To promote her debut album, Valenzuela performed at various venues across Chile, as well as Mexico, Argentina, and other countries throughout Latin America.

=== 2009–2013: Buen Soldado ===
In early 2009, Valenzuela began the pre-production stages for her second album in Santiago and Berlin. She contributed to the Chilean water conservation documentary H2O:Cero, by composing a new song called "En Blanco" for the film. She has also participated in the album tribute for Violeta Parra, recording a new version of "Run Run Se Fue Pa'l Norte" as well as recording a version of Inti-Illimani's song "Vuelvo".

In 2009, she collaborated with Chilean rapper, Latin Bitman for his album Colour; Valenzuela co-wrote and sang two songs, "Help Me" and "Someday". "Help Me" was later released as a single in the United States and Chile and a music video was also filmed in Los Angeles in November 2009. In August 2010, Valenzuela began recording for her second studio album in Santiago. Production on the album was completed in late 2010. On January 1, 2011, Valenzuela released in digital formats her first single "Quiero Verte Más" from her second studio album called Buen Soldado; the album was released on March 3, 2011, in Chile as a physical and digital release. In addition to embarking on a national tour in Chile, Valenzuela also promoted Buen Soldado internationally at the South by Southwest music festival in Austin, Texas in March 2012. She also performed at Midem in Cannes, France, representing Chile. Valenzuela had previously performed at the festival in 2011.

Valenzuela is a featured artist on Spanish singer-songwriter, Alejandro Sanz's tribute album, Y Si Fueran Ellas. She recorded a cover of Sanz's Lola Soledad for the album. The album features contributions from thirteen female vocalists, including Thalía and Ana Torroja. The album was released worldwide on iTunes on November 19, 2013.

=== 2014–2017: Tajo Abierto and Ruidosa Fest ===
In May 2014, Valenzuela confirmed that her third studio album, Tajo Abierto, would be released in September 2014. The album's first official single, "Prenderemos fuego al cielo", was available for digital download on iTunes on July 15, 2014. Valenzuela wrote most of the album on the piano before learning how to use special computer software to create the final studio version. She began recording her third studio album in November 2013 and completed production in May 2014. The majority of the album was recorded in Los Angeles, California, with the exception of one song, "Cuequita del corazón", which Valenzuela recorded in Santiago, Chile at Estudios del Sur. Valenzuela worked on the album with four producers: Jesse Rogg, Vicente Sanfuentes (who co-produced her second album), Dave Sitek, and Áureo Baqueiro. Valenzuela wrote 25 songs for the album and chose 11 for the final track listing.

In 2014, Valenzuela formed her own independent record label, Frantastic Records, with the help of her mother, her friend and future romantic partner, Chilean producer Vicente Sanfuentes, and a small team in Chile. Tajo Abierto was released worldwide on iTunes on September 9, 2014. To promote the album, she performed in Spain, Mexico, and Chile in September and November 2014. She returned to the US, where she debuted at Lollapalooza in Chicago on August 1, 2014. While in the US, she performed in Los Angeles and Oakland, California. "Armadura" was announced as the album's second single and was released for digital download on December 11, 2014. Tajo Abierto was named one of the best albums of 2014 by iTunes Chile.

In 2014, Valenzuela traveled to the Brazilian cities of Manaus and Rio de Janeiro, as well as the Amazonian Jungle, to write and record a music video for the HBO Latin America tourism documentary, "Encuentros en Brasil". She wrote the song, "Reina tropical de Brasil" ("Tropical Queen of Brazil" in English). The documentary series aired in Latin America and the Caribbean in September 2014. An EP of songs from the documentary was later released on iTunes on July 14, 2014.

In late December 2014, Valenzuela was selected along with 23 other well-known international artists to record the official theme song, "Live It", for at the 24th annual World Men's Handball Championship. A music video for the song was filmed and later premiered on YouTube on December 18, 2014. Valenzuela represents Chile. She and the other artists performed at the opening ceremony in Doha, Qatar on January 15, 2015.

In 2016, Valenzuela announced the first edition of Ruidosa Fest in Santiago and Mexico City, the first Latin American festival to feature only women.

=== 2018–2025: La Fortaleza, Vida Tan Bonita, and Adentro ===
In 2018, she released the first two singles of her upcoming fourth studio album, "Tómame" and "Ya no se trata de ti", both tracks charted on the Chile Singles Chart, peaking on the positions 15 and 39, respectively. In July 2019, she released "Héroe", the third single of the album, which reach the top 10 on the Chile Singles Chart, making her fifth top 10 on the country. She performed the song at the closing ceremony of the 2019 Pan American Games in Lima, Peru during the handover segment for the next Games in her hometown Santiago.

On January 17, 2020, Valenzuela released her fourth studio album, La Fortaleza. A week before she released the fourth single of the album, "Flotando" which peaked at the number 70 on the Chile Singles Chart.

Her fifth studio album, Vida Tan Bonita, was released on May 6, 2022 via Sony Music Chile. The opening song, "Se Va", was written and dedicated to her parents as an homage to their immigration to the United States in the 1970s. The album drew its influences from female pop singers from the 1990s, such as Paulina Robio and Thalia.

Her sixth studio album, Adentro, was released on August 18, 2023 to critical acclaim for its raw and sobering songwriting, as noted by Rolling Stone magazine.

In January 2025, Rolling Stone cited Valenzuela's unreleased and untitled seventh studio album among its most anticipated Latin American records for 2025. The album was recorded in Mexico City and Santiago, Chile and is expected to feature piano-based compositions.

=== 2026–present: Maldita ===
On April 9, 2026, Valenzuela released the song titled "Bugambilia", which served as the lead single from her upcoming studio album. On May 28, 2026, she released a second single titled "Malacara", alongside the announcement of the name, artwork, date and pre-save of her upcoming seventh studio album, Maldita, which is expected to be released on July 30, 2026. "SOS" was released as the third single of the album.

== Fashion career ==
Valenzuela began modeling for the popular Chilean clothing brand, Foster, in 2012. In May 2013, she partnered with the company to design a collection. Her collection features black and white pieces inspired by 60s mod and ska. The collection is available exclusively in Foster stores throughout Chile. On November 6, 2013, Valenzuela revealed that she had designed a second collection for Foster. The Summer 2014 collection features 21 pieces, including accessories like handbags and wallets, designed by Valenzuela.

== Personal life ==
Valenzuela took a summer course in international relations at the University of California, Berkeley. Later, she studied journalism at Universidad Católica in Santiago, Chile. In 2010, due to a busy touring and pre-production schedule for her second album, she put her studies on hold and later dropped out to pursue music full-time. Beginning January 2016, she was in a relationship with Chilean producer Vicente Sanfuentes, which ended in 2022. Sanfuentes produced her second studio album in 2011. The breakup inspired Francisca's album, Adentro. She resided in Los Angeles, California for several years before the release of her third and fourth studio albums.

As of 2023, she lives in Mexico City. She chose Mexico City to further her career opportunities within the music industry in Latin America. Valenzuela revealed that a few years after the release of her third studio album, she was subsequently diagnosed with depression, anxiety, and obsessive–compulsive disorder. She previously discussed dealing with suicidal thoughts and the desire to no longer tour her music during depressive episodes. Her fourth studio album featured songs that openly discussed her mental health.

In April 2024, she confirmed that she was in a relationship with Chilean television news journalist Daniel Matamala, who works for CNN Chile. On August of the same year, Valenzuela confirmed through her social media accounts that she was expecting her first child.

In November 2024, her first child, a daughter, was born in Santiago, Chile. No further details about the birth were released publicly.

== Discography ==
=== Studio albums ===
List of albums, with selected chart positions and certifications
Title	Album details	Peak chart positions	Certifications
Title	Album details	CHI	Certifications
Muérdete La Lengua	Released: June 11, 2007; Label: Feria Music; Formats: CD, digital download, vinyl	7	CHI: Platinum (10,000+ sales)
Buen Soldado	Released: March 3, 2011; Label: Sony BMG/Independent; Formats: CD, digital download	3	CHI: Gold (5,000+ sales)
Tajo Abierto	Released: September 9, 2014; Label: Frantastic Records; Formats: CD, digital download, vinyl	2	
La Fortaleza	Released: January 17, 2020; Label: Sony Music Chile; Formats: Digital download	4	
Vida tan bonita	Released: May 6, 2022; Label: Frantastic Records, Sony Music Chile; Formats: CD, Digital download	—	
Adentro	Released: August 18, 2023; Label: Frantastic Records; Formats: CD, Digital download	—	
Maldita	Released: July 30, 2026; Label: Frantastic Records; Formats: Vinyl, Digital download	—	
"—" denotes releases that did not chart or were not released in that territory.

=== Singles ===
Single	Year	Peak chart positions	Album
Single	Year	CHI	Album
"Peces"	2006	85	Muérdete La Lengua
"Dulce"	2006	2	Muérdete La Lengua
"Muérdete La Lengua"	2007	6	Muérdete La Lengua
"Afortunada"	2008	30	Muérdete La Lengua
"Muleta"	2008	78	Muérdete La Lengua
"El Tiempo en Las Bastillas"	2009	93	Los 80, más que una moda
"Quiero Verte Más"	2011	17	Buen Soldado
"Que Sería"	2011	71	Buen Soldado
"En Mi Memoria"	2011	91	Buen Soldado
"Buen Soldado"	2012	10	Buen Soldado
"Prenderemos fuego al cielo"	2014	9	Tajo Abierto
"Armadura"	2014	24	Tajo Abierto
"Insulto"	2015	61	Tajo Abierto
"Almost Superstars"	2015	85	Tajo Abierto
"Catedral"	2016	100	Tajo Abierto
"Tómame"	2018	15	La Fortaleza
"Ya No Se Trata de Ti" (solo or with Elsa Y Elmar)	2018	39	La Fortaleza
"Héroe"	2019	10	La Fortaleza
"Al Final del Mundo" (featuring Claudio Parra)	2019	—	La Fortaleza
"Flotando" (solo or with Matisse)	2020	70	La Fortaleza
"Ven a Buscarlo"	2020	—	La Fortaleza
"La Fortaleza"	2020	—	La Fortaleza
"Amiga Cruel"	2020	—	La Fortaleza
"Normal Mujer" (solo or with Cami)	2020	75	La Fortaleza
"Castillo de Cristal"	2021	—	Vida tan bonita
"Último Baile"	2021	—	Vida tan bonita
"Salú"	2021	—	Vida tan bonita
"Como la Flor"	2022	—	Vida tan bonita
"Hola Impostora"	2022	—	Vida tan bonita
"Dar y Dar"	2022	—	Vida tan bonita
"¿Dónde se llora cuando se llora?"	2023	—	Adentro
"Nada para ti" (featuring Ximena Sariñana)	2023	—	Adentro
"Extraño"	2023	—	Adentro
"Adentro"	2024	—	Adentro
"Continente"	2024	—	Adentro
"Juan"	2024	—	Adentro
"Quiéreme O Ándate" (featuring Daniela Spalla)	2024	—	Non-album single
"Rompecorazones"	2024	—	Non-album single
"Raíces"	2024	—	Non-album single
"Tira y Afloja (Afuera)"	2025	—	Non-album single
"Bugambilia"	2026	—	Maldita
"Malacara"	2026	—	Maldita
"SOS"	2026	—	Maldita
"—" denotes releases that did not chart or were not released in that territory.

==== As featured artist ====
Single	Year	Peak chart position	Album
Single	Year	CHI	Album
"Help Me" (with Latin Bitman)	2009	91	Colour
"Al Frío" (with Leonel García)	2010	84	Tú
"Propósitos de Año Nuevo" (with Leonel García)	2011	—	Leonel García y sus Amigos en Navidad
"Mucho Corazón" (with Sussie 4)	2012	—	Radiolatina
"Sueño Imaginado" (with Américo)	2013	—	Américo de América
"Dicen" (with Francisco el Hombre)	2014	—	Non-album single
"Buen Soldado" (with Miss Caffeina)	2014	—	Non-album single
"Lanza Perfume" (with Orquesta Discotheque)	2014	—	Non-album single
"Ciudad Traicionera" (with Manu Da Banda, Joe Vasconcellos)	2015	—	Travesía Elefante
"Distante" (with Avionica)	2016	—	Non-album single
"Al Azul del Morir" (with Kalfu)	2016	—	Trawvn = ReUnión
"Dos" (with We Are The Grand)	2017	—	Non-album single
"Punta Norte" (with Salon Acapulco)	2018	—	Non-album single
"Oy1" (with alexmaax)	2019	—	Non-album single
"Pueblo Abandonado" (with Ximena Sariñana)	2019	—	¿Dónde Bailarán las Niñas?
"Pies de Duende Frágil" (with Santiago Cruz)	2019	—	Elementales
"Nefertiti" (with Diamante Eléctrico)	2019	—	Buitres & Co.
"El Derecho de Vivir en Paz" (with Various Artists)	2019	—	Non-album single
"Te lo pido por favor" (with Francisco Victoria)	2022	—	Herida
"Abrazándonos" (with Abel Pintos)	2022	—	Non-album single
"Big Baby Bogotá" (with Portugal. The Man and Estereomance)	2025	—	uLu Selects Vol #2
"—" denotes releases that did not chart or were not released in that territory.

==== Other songs ====
Single	Year	Peak chart position	Album
Single	Year	CHI	Album
"Vuelvo	2006	—	Inti-Illimani, Tributo a su Música
"Tu Nombre Me Sabe a Yerba"	2010	—	Señora: Ellas Cantan a Serrat
"Run Run Se Fue Pal Norte"	2017	—	Después de Vivir Un Siglo
"—" denotes releases that did not chart or were not released in that territory.

== Music videos ==
- "Dulce" (2006)
- "Muérdete La Lengua" (2007)
- "Afortunada" (2008)
- "Muleta" (2008)
- "Peces" (2009)
- ""El Tiempo en Las Bastillas" (2009)
- "Help Me (Latin Bitman feat. Francisca Valenzuela) (2009)
- "Estrechez de Corazón (as a featured artist) (2011)
- "Quiero Verte Más" (2011)
- "Que Sería" (2011)
- "En Mi Memoria" (2011)
- "Esta Soy Yo" (2011)
- "Mucho Corazón" (Sussie 4 feat. Francisca Valenzuela) (2012)
- "Buen Soldado (2012)
- "Reina tropical de Brasil" (2014)
- ""Prenderemos fuego al cielo" (2014)
- "Live It" (as a featured artist) (2014)
- "Armadura" (2015)
- "Insulto" (2015)
- "Almost Superstars" (2015)
- "Catedral" (2016)
- "Estremecer" (2016)
- "Tómame" (2018)
- "Ya No Se Trata De Ti" (2018)
- "Héroe" (2019)
- "Flotando" (2020)
- "Ven a Buscarlo" (2020)
- "La Fortaleza" (2020)
- "Normal Mujer" (2020)
- "Castillo de Cristal" (2021)
- "Último Baile" (2021)
- "SALÚ" (2021)
- "Como la Flor" (2022)
- "Hola Impostora" (2022)
- "Dar y Dar" (2022)
- ¿Donde Se Llora Cuando Se Llora? (2023)
- "Nada Para Ti" (2023)
- "Extraño" (2023)
- "Adentro" (2024)
- "Continente" (2024)
- "Juan" (2024)
- "Dejalo Ir" (2024)
- "Lo Nuestro Nadie Puede Borrarlo" (2024)
- "Quiéreme O Ándate" (2024)
- "Rompecorazones" (2024)
- "Raices" (2024)
- "Tira y Afloja (Afuera)" (2025)
- "Bugamilia" (2026)
- "Malacara" (2026)
- "SOS" (2026)

== Awards and nominations ==
Valenzuela has received various accolades throughout her music career, including: four Premios Pulsar, one Premio MUSA, six Viña del Mar International Song Festival victories, as well as nominations for five Latin Grammy Awards, and five Copihue de Oro.

=== Major associations ===
==== Latin Grammy Awards ====
Award	Year	Category	Nominee/work	Result	Ref.
Latin Grammy Awards	2015	Best Recording Package	Tajo Abierto	Nominated	
Latin Grammy Awards	2023	Best Pop/Rock Song	¿Dónde Se Llora Cuando Se Llora?	Nominated	
Latin Grammy Awards	2024	Best Pop/Rock Album	Adentro	Nominated	
Latin Grammy Awards	2024	Best Alternative Song	Déjalo Ir	Nominated	
Latin Grammy Awards	2026	Best Alternative Song	Bugambilia	Nominated	

==== Premios Pulsar ====
Award	Year	Category	Nominee/work	Result	Ref.
Premios Pulsar	2015	Song of the Year	Prenderemos Fuego Al Cielo	Nominated	
Premios Pulsar	2016	SDC Award for Most Played Song	Prenderemos Fuego Al Cielo	Won	
Premios Pulsar	2019	Song of the Year	Ya No Se Trata de Tí	Nominated	
Premios Pulsar	2021	Song of the Year	Flotando	Won	
Premios Pulsar	2021	Album of the Year	La Fortaleza	Won	
Premios Pulsar	2021	Best Pop Artist	Herself	Won	
Premios Pulsar	2021	Artist of the Year	Herself	Nominated	
Premios Pulsar	2022	Song of the Year	Castillo de Cristal	Nominated	
Premios Pulsar	2024	Record of the Year	Adentro	Nominated	
Premios Pulsar	2024	People's Choice	Herself	Nominated	
Premios Pulsar	2024	Best Pop Artist	Herself	Nominated	
Premios Pulsar	2024	Song of the Year	¿Dondé Se Llora Cuando Se Llora?	Nominated	
Premios Pulsar	2024	Album of the Year	Adentro	Nominated	

==== Premios MUSA ====
Award	Year	Category	Nominee/work	Result	Ref.
Premios MUSA	2020	Album of the Year	La Fortaleza	Nominated	
Premios MUSA	2020	Pop Artist of the Year	Herself	Nominated	
Premios MUSA	2020	Video of the Year	La Fortaleza	Won	
Premios MUSA	2021	Pop Artist of the Year	Herself	Nominated	
Premios MUSA	2022	Album of the Year	Vida tan Bonita	Nominated	
Premios MUSA	2022	Pop Artist of the Year	Herself	Nominated	
Premios MUSA	2022	Song of the Year	Dar y Dar	Nominated	
Premios MUSA	2022	Collaboration of the Year	Te lo pido por favor (with Francisco Victoria)	Nominated	
Premios MUSA	2023	Album of the Year	Adentro	Nominated	
Premios MUSA	2023	Song of the Year	¿Dónde Se Llora Cuando Se Llora?	Nominated	
Premios MUSA	2023	Video of the Year	¿Dónde Se Llora Cuando Se Llora?	Nominated	
Premios MUSA	2023	Pop Artist of the Year	Herself	Nominated	
Premios MUSA	2023	Collaboration of the Year	Nada Para Ti (with Ximena Sariñana)	Nominated	
Premios MUSA	2024	Pop Artist of the Year	Herself	Nominated	
Premios MUSA	2024	Video of the Year	Juan	Nominated	

==== Copihue de Oro ====
Award	Year	Category	Nominee/work	Result	Ref.
Copihue de Oro	2011	Best Pop/Rock Artist	Herself	Nominated	
Copihue de Oro	2012	Best Pop/Rock Artist	Herself	Nominated	
Copihue de Oro	2013	Best Pop/Rock Artist	Herself	Nominated	
Copihue de Oro	2014	Best Pop/Rock Artist	Herself	Nominated	
Copihue de Oro	2015	Best Pop/Rock Artist	Herself	Nominated	

==== Viña del Mar International Song Festival ====
Award	Year	Category	Nominee/work	Result	Ref.
Viña del Mar International Song Festival	2013	Silver Torch	Herself	Won	
Viña del Mar International Song Festival	2013	Golden Torch	Herself	Won	
Viña del Mar International Song Festival	2013	Silver Seagull	Herself	Won	
Viña del Mar International Song Festival	2013	Golden Seagull	Herself	Won	
Viña del Mar International Song Festival	2020	Silver Seagull	Herself	Won	
Viña del Mar International Song Festival	2020	Golden Seagull	Herself	Won	

=== Other associations ===
Award	Year	Category	Nominee/work	Result	Ref.
Premios Apes	2008	Best New Artist	Herself	Won	
Premios Gold Tie	2012	Best Juvenile Singer	Herself	Nominated	
Premios Gold Tie	2012	Best Music Video	En Mi Memoria	Nominated	
Premios 40 Principales América	2014	Chilean Artist	Herself	Won	
Premios MIN	2015	International Artist	Herself	Won	
