= Sueños en tránsito =

Studio album by Nicole
- Released: 19 June 1997
- Recorded: 1995–97; Matrix Studios, London
- Genre: Pop, alternative rock, electronic, indie pop, trip hop
- Length: 43:07
- Label: RCA
- Producer: Gustavo Cerati

Nicole chronology
Esperando nada (1994)	Sueños en tránsito (1997)	Grandes éxitos (2002)

Singles from Sueños en tránsito
- 1. "Despiertame" Released: April 1997; 2. "Todo Lo Que Quiero" Released: September 1997; 3. "No Soy De Nadie" Released: February 1998; 4. "Noche" Released: July 1998

Professional ratings
Review scores
Source	Rating
Allmusic	4.7/5 stars
Rolling Stone	4/5 stars

Sueños en tránsito (Spanish: Dreams in traffic) is the third studio album by recording artist Nicole. It was released by BMG on 19 June 1997, being Nicole's last album for the label. Production was entirely handled by Gustavo Cerati, and represented the most radical change in Nicole's musical style, shifting from her traditional Latin pop and pop rock influences, to exploring electronic, trip hop, and alternative rock styles.

The album received critical acclaim from critics, who praised its innovative style, Cerati's production, and Nicole's vocals and songwriting.

== Track listing ==
All tracks produced by Gustavo Cerati, unless otherwise noted.

Standard edition
No.	Title	Writer(s)	Producer(s)	Length
1.	"Cielos"	Nicole; Sebastián Piga; Andrés Sylleros		4:21
2.	"Despiértame"	Nicole; Piga; Sylleros		4:00
3.	"Noche"	Leo García		2:28
4.	"Todo Lo Que Quiero"	Sara Ugarte; Claudia Parra		3:08
5.	"Sirenas"	Nicole; Piga; Sylleros		5:00
6.	"Tuve Que Herirme"	Ugarte		4:31
7.	"No Soy de Nadie"	Carola Bony		3:12
8.	"Cuervos"	Nicole; Piga; Sylleros		4:28
9.	"Amores Sin Voz"	Nicole; Sylleros		3:19
10.	"Piel Lunar"	Nicole; Cerati; Sylleros; Guillermo Ugarte		3:25
11.	"Lunas" (Instrumental)	Nicole; Cerati; Sylleros; Guillermo Ugarte		2:23
12.	"Verte Reír"	Nicole	Nicole; Cerati	2:34

== Personnel ==
Taken and adapted from Allmusic.com.

- Nicole - Art Direction, Composer, Performer, Lyricist, Producer, Primary Artist, Vocals (Lead and background)
- Marcelo Aedo - Bassist
- Gustavo Cerati - Producer, Composer, Guitar, Vocals (Background)
- Ray Staff - Mastering
- Andres Sylleros - Arranger, Composer, Keyboards
- Ernesto Medina - Design
- Lloyd Gardiner - Mixing
- Guillermo Ugarte - Composer, Keyboard Programming, Sample Programming
- Andre Baeza - Drums
- Emilo Garcia - Guitar
- Eduardo Bergallo - Engineer, Mixing
- Joaquin Garcia - Assistant Engineer
- Sebastian Piga - Composer, Flute, Guitar, Vocals (Background)
- Mario Salazar - Photography
- Gideon Mendel - Photography
