= Esperando nada =

Studio album by Nicole
- Released: November 1994
- Genre: Pop rock, pop
- Label: RCA

Nicole chronology
| Tal vez me estoy enamorando (1989) | Esperando nada (1994) | Sueños en tránsito (1997) |

Esperando nada (Spanish: Expecting nothing) is the second album by Chilean singer Nicole. It was released in November, 1994.

== Track listing ==
1. "Mundo Perdido" - 4:17
2. "Dame Luz" - 5:00
3. "Esperando Nada" - 4:14
4. "Sin Gamulán" - 3:45
5. "Territorios" - 3:54
6. "Va A Llover" - 4:38
7. "Extraño Ser" - 3:42
8. "Sigo Buscándote" - 5:02
9. "Sólo El Mar" - 4:48
10. "Cuando Yo Me Transformé" - 2:16
11. "Tres Pies Al Gato" - 4:17
12. "Con Este Sol" - 3:25

== Charts ==
| Chart (1996) | Peak position |
|---|---|
| Chile (APF) | 10 |
