= La Fortaleza (album) =

Studio album by Francisca Valenzuela
- Released: January 17, 2020
- Venue: Santiago, Chile; Ciudad de México, México; Los Angeles, USA
- Genre: Pop
- Label: Sony Music Chile

Francisca Valenzuela chronology
Tajo Abierto (2014)	La Fortaleza (2020)

Singles from La Fortaleza
- 1. "Tómame" Released: July 20, 2018; 2. "Ya No Se Trata de Ti" Released: November 7, 2018; 3. "Héroe" Released: July 26, 2019; 4. "Flotando" Released: January 10, 2020; 5. "Ven a buscarlo" Released: April 24, 2020; 6. "La Fortaleza" Released: July 23, 2020

La Fortaleza (Latin American Spanish: [la foɾtaˈlesa], lit. 'Fortitude') is the fourth studio album by Chilean-American singer-songwriter Francisca Valenzuela. It was digitally released on January 17, 2020, by Sony Music Chile. The album consists of fourteen tracks, including the singles "Tómame" and "Héroe". It won the Pulsar Award for Album of the Year.

== Background ==
The album title was inspired by the painting Fortitude by Botticelli.

== Promotion ==
Valenzuela started promotions in the "Tómame Tour" that visited some casinos in Chile in October 2018. Two months later, she embarked in a promotional "summer tour" that visited different cities in Chile. She also was part of the 2019 edition of Lollapalooza Chile.

On November 18, 2019, it was confirmed that she will take part at the 2020 Festival de Viña del Mar, performing on January 24. She performed for the first time in 2016, as part of the judge panel.

== Singles ==
"Tómame" was released as a single on July 20, 2018. Francisca said that the song was "the first vertebra of a more ambitious album". It was described as a pop song that doesn't hide the sensual side that the title already suggests. At the time of the release, the singer confirmed that this was the first cut from her upcoming fourth studio album.

"Ya No Se Trata de Ti" was released as a single on November 7, 2018.

"Héroe" was released as a single on July 26, 2019. Valenzuela described the song as an invitation to find the strength to overcome darkness and find the light. The singer performed the song at the closure ceremony for the 2019 Pan American Games.

"Al Final del Mundo" was released on November 8, 2019, and features Chilean pianist Claudio Parra from the Chilean group, Los Jaivas. It was described as a political song that embodies the sentiment from the social movement the country is facing. She also performed the song at the 2019 PanAm Games.

"Flotando" was released on January 10, 2020, a week prior to the album release.

== Track listing ==
All tracks are written by Francisca Valenzuela, except where noted.

La Fortalez – Standard edition
No.	Title	Writer(s)	Producer(s)	Length
1.	"Nunca Quise Herirte"		Vicente Sanfuentes; Fernando Herrera	2:07
2.	"Héroe"	Francisca Valenzuela; Sanfuentes; Jarina De Marco	Valenzuela; Sanfuentes; F. Herrera	3:26
3.	"Tómame"		Sanfuentes; F. Herrera	3:07
4.	"Ven a Buscarlo"	Valenzuela; Max Hershenow	Sanfuentes; F. Herrera; Hershenow	3:20
5.	"Flotando"	Valenzuela; Sanfuentes	Sanfuentes; Vicente Herrera	4:00
6.	"Al Final del Mundo" (feat. Claudio Parra)		Sanfuentes; F. Herrera	4:04
7.	"Ya No Se Trata de Ti"		Valenzuela; Sanfuentes; F. Herrera	3:19
8.	"No Te Alcanzó"		Sanfuentes; Manú Jalil	4:33
9.	"Ansiedad (Peleo Con Las Sombras)"		Sanfuentes; F. Herrera	2:23
10.	"Normal Mujer"		Sanfuentes; Ceci Gómez; Max Hershenow	3:58
11.	"Amiga Cruel"		Sanfuentes; F. Herrera; Hershenow	3:22
12.	"Boca"		Sanfuentes; F. Herrera; Gómez	3:12
13.	"Una Noche Contigo"		Sanfuentes; Linus Wiklund	3:06
14.	"La Fortaleza"		Sanfuentes; F. Herrera; Roberto Trujillo	3:55
Total length:				47:53

== See also ==
- List of 2020 albums
