= Chini.png =

Chilean musician (born 1991)

- Born: María José Ayarza; 7 February 1991 (age 35); Santiago, Chile
- Occupations: Musician; singer; visual artist
- Years active: 2014–present
- Musical career
- Genres: shoegaze; indie pop
- Instruments: Vocals; guitar
- Label: Uva Robot

María José Ayarza (Santiago, February 7, 1991), known artistically as Chini.png, is a Chilean singer and visual artist.

== Career ==
As a student of arts at Pontifical Catholic University of Chile, María José Ayarza started the musical project Chini & the Technicians alongside Roberto González in 2014. Later, Gabriel Ardiles (bass), Sebastián Riffo (percussion), and Tiare Galaz (backing vocals, ukulele, and percussion) joined the band.

Following the release of the EP En el fondo todo va bien (2015) and the album Arriba es Abajo, the band went on hiatus two years later.

In 2020, Ayarza began her solo career under the name Chini.png, releasing her EP titled Ctrl+Z. Her first solo EP earned her three nominations at the 2021 Pulsar Awards in the categories of Best New Artist, Best Music Video (as director of Triángulo de las Bermudas) and Best Album Art (for the cover art of "Ctrl+Z").

The following year, she was once again nominated at the Pulsar Awards for her role as the director in the Best Music Video category for the song Fisura.

Chini.png participated in the BIME Festival in Spain in 2022 and Lollapalooza Chile 2023. In July 2023, she recorded a session at the legendary radio station KEXP in Seattle, United States, as part of the first Ibero-American music festival of the radio, El Sonido Live.

Later that year, El Día Libre de Polux was selected as one of the best Spanish-language albums of 2023 by Rolling Stone and one of the 50 albums comprising the Alternative Latin Music of 2023 list by KEXP.

== Discography ==
Studio albums

- El Día Libre de Polux (2023)
- Vía Lo Orozco (2025)
