= Camila Gallardo =

Chilean singer and songwriter

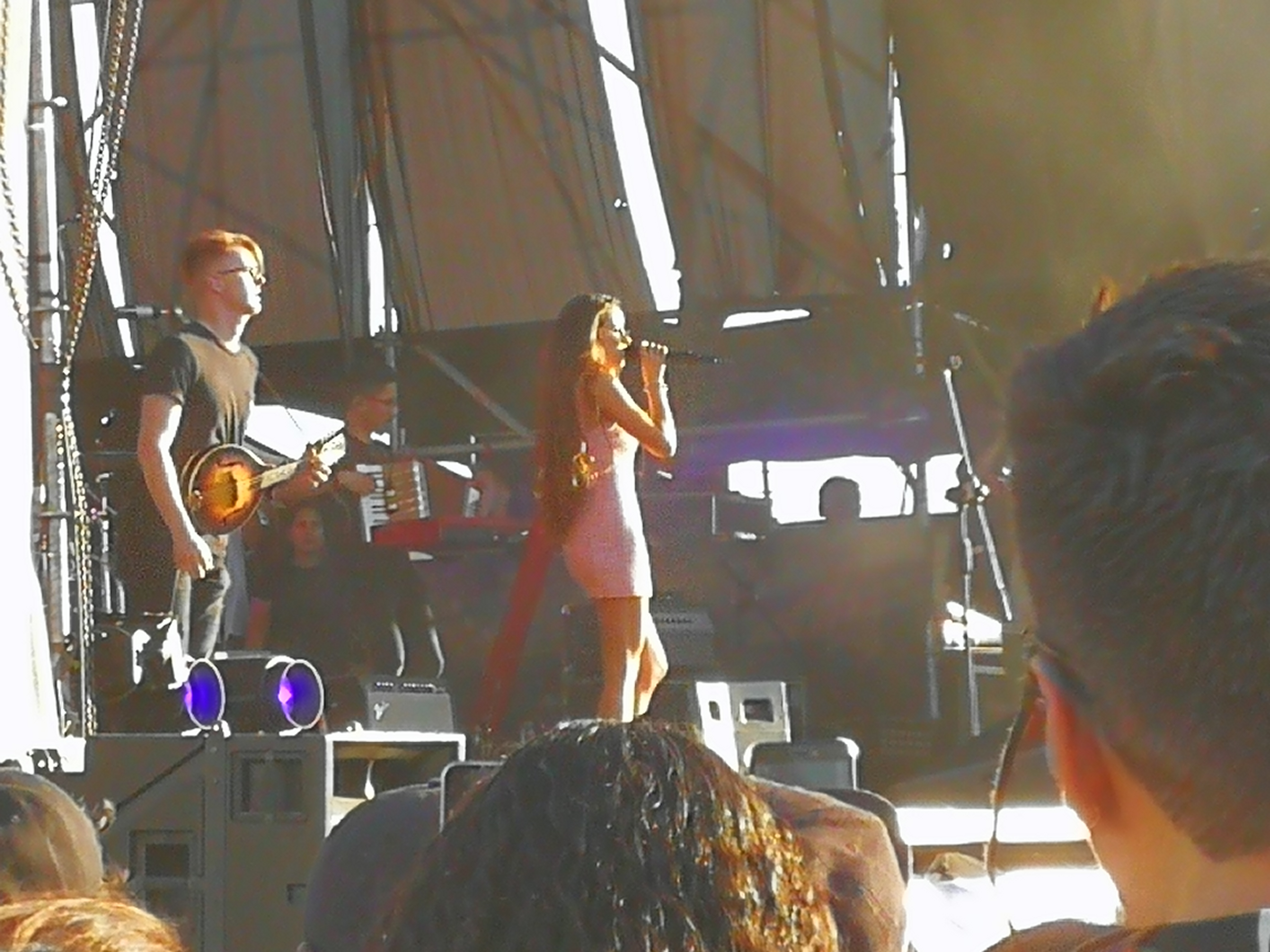
- Gallardo at the 2017 Pulsar Awards.

Background information
- Born: Camila Anastasia Gallardo Montalva; 2 November 1996 (age 29); Viña del Mar, Chile
- Occupations: Singer, songwriter
- Years active: 2015–present
- Label: Universal Music

Camila Anastasia Gallardo Montalva (born 2 November 1996), known as Cami, is a Chilean singer and songwriter. She started her career after appearing in the Chilean vocal talent show The Voice Chile, where she came second place. She has released two studio albums and has received a Grammy Award nomination as well as two Latin Grammy Award nominations.

== Career ==
=== 2015-2017: Beginnings and The Voice Chile ===
In 2015, Gallardo auditioned for the first season of the Chilean vocal talent show The Voice Chile with the song "The Story" by American singer Brandi Carlile, after her performance she chose Luis Fonsi as her coach, she would eventually end at second place in the competition. Later, she was signed with Universal Music and released her debut single "Más de la Mitad" in 2016, the song was written by Luis Fonsi and Claudia Brant and was produced by Andrés Saavedra in Miami, United States. The single became the most streamed single by a Chilean artist in 2016 achieving seven million streams within its first year of release.

In 2017, she performed in a hommage to Violeta Parra at the 2017 Viña del Mar International Song Festival alongside Chilean artists Paz Binimelis, Claudia Acuña, Consuelo Schuster, Isabel Parra and Tita Parra. The same year, she released two singles, "Abrázame" in April and "Un Poco Más de Frío" in August. During late 2017, she recorded what would become her debut album in Los Angeles, United States, produced by Sebastian Krys.

=== 2018-2019: Rosa and Monstruo, Vol. 1 ===
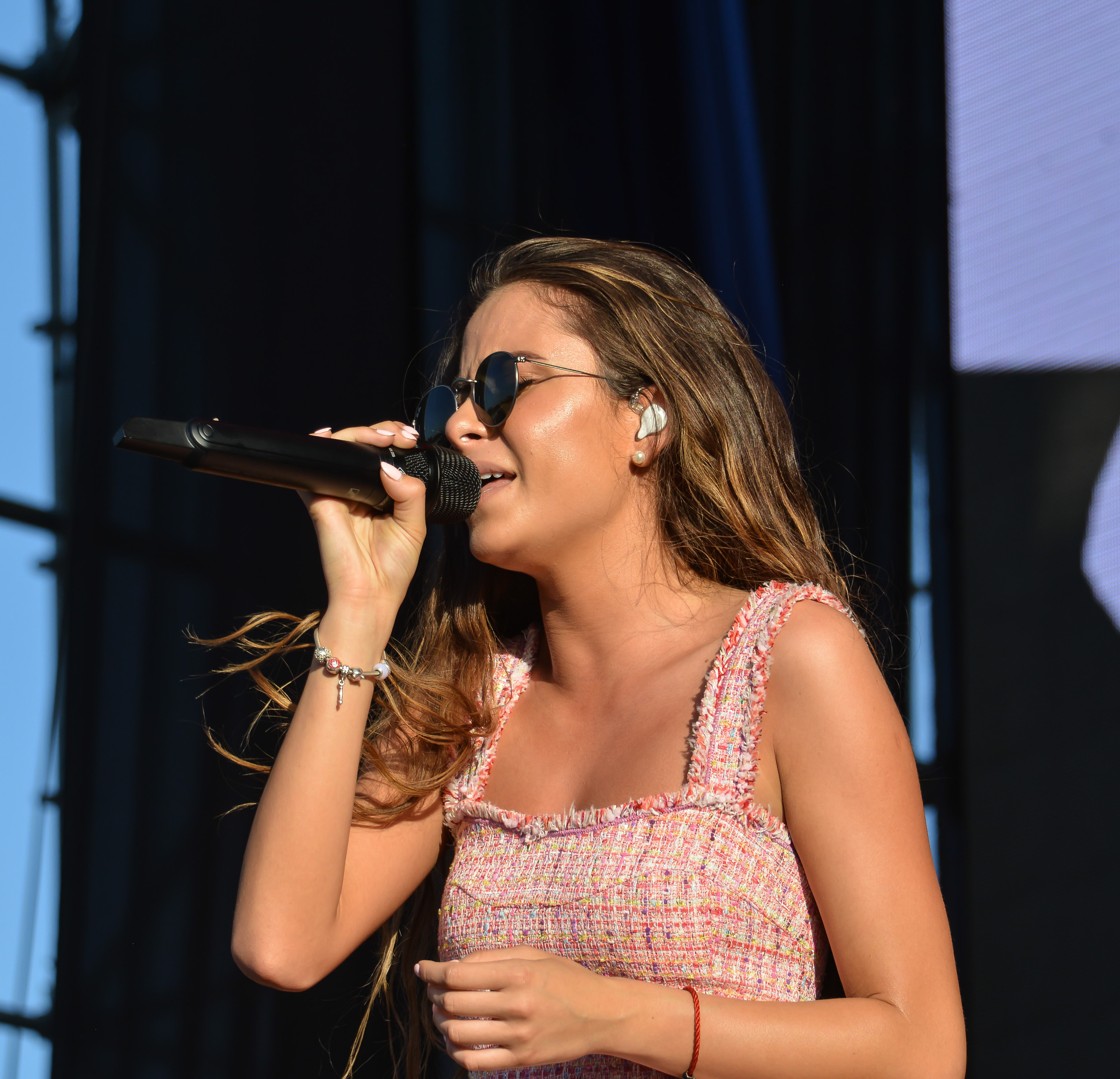
Camila Gallardo, 2018

In early January 2018 she released the singles "Ven" and "No es Real", the latter with Spanish singer Antonio José, her debut studio album Rosa was released on June 8, 2018, and was certified platinum in Chile selling over 55,000 copies, the album was promoted by several concerts including one at the Movistar Arena in Santiago, Chile, making Gallardo the youngest Chilean artist to perform at the venue. In 2019, she was part of the jury at the 2019 Viña del Mar International Song Festival, she also performed at the festival receiving both of the awards given by the audience, the Silver Seagull and Golden Seagull, during her performance she also debuted the song "La Entrevista", the first single for her second studio album.

At the 2019 Pulsar Awards, given by the Sociedad Chilena del Derecho de Autor, Gallardo was nominated for Album of the Year and Artist of the Year and won Best Pop Artist. At the 20th Annual Latin Grammy Awards, also in 2019, she was nominated for Best New Artist and Best Traditional Pop Vocal Album, she also performed at the Person of the Year ceremony, given to Colombian singer Juanes in that year, where she performed the song "Fotografía" alongside Colombian band Morat and Spanish singer Pablo López. The release of her second studio album had to be postponed due to the 2019–2022 Chilean protests, the album was divided in two parts with the first part being released as an EP on November under the title Monstruo, Vol. 1.

=== 2020-present: Monstruo ===
Her second studio album Monstruo was released on 6 March 2020, including the previously released song "La Entrevista" as well as the singles "Aquí Estoy", "La Despedida" and "Funeral", the latter with Argentine rapper WOS, to promote the album she embarked on a tour through Chile, Spain, Uruguay, Argentina and Mexico. At the 2020 Pulsar Awards, Gallardo was nominated for Album of the Year and Best Pop Artist the first part of the album, Monstruo, Vol. 1, and she won Song of the Year for "Aquí Estoy" and Artist of the Year.

During 2020 and 2021, she collaborated with artists like Spanish singer Alba Reche in "que bailen", about the protests in Chile, and Colombian band Morat in "Simplemente Pasan". In 2021, she was nominated for Best Latin Rock, Urban or Alternative Album at the 63rd Annual Grammy Awards, for Monstruo. In 2022, she appeared as a coach in the third season of The Voice Chile.

== Discography ==
=== Studio albums ===
- Rosa (2018)
- Monstruo (2020)
- Anastasia (2022)
- ANNA EL SHOW (2024)

=== EPs ===
- Monstruo, Vol. 1 (2019)
- ANNA Vol1. LOS AMANTES (2023)
- ANNA Vol.2 EL OJO DE MI FRENTE (2025)

== Awards and nominations ==
=== Grammy Awards ===
Year	Category	Nominated work	Result	Ref.
2021	Best Latin Rock, Urban or Alternative Album	Monstruo	Nominated	

=== Latin Grammy Awards ===
Year	Category	Nominated work	Result	Ref.
2019	Best New Artist	Herself	Nominated	
2019	Best Traditional Pop Vocal Album	Rosa	Nominated	
2022	Best Short Form Music Video	"Mía"	Nominated	
2023	Best Alternative Song	"ANASTASIA"	Nominated	
