= Camila Moreno =

Chilean rock and folk singer-songwriter (born 1985)

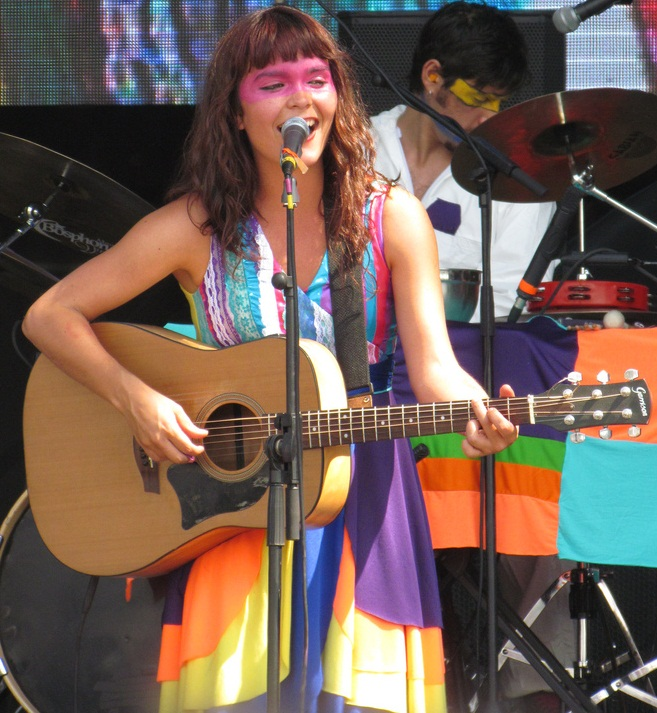
- Camila Moreno at a concert in 2012

Background information
- Birth name: Camila Moreno Elgart
- Born: July 8, 1985 (age 40)
- Origin: Chile
- Genres: Folk rock, Rock, Indie
- Instrument(s): Vocals, guitar, accordion, charango, piano, cuatro venezolano
- Years active: 2007–present
- Website: https://www.camila-moreno.com/

Camila Moreno (born July 8, 1985 in Santiago) is a Chilean rock and folk singer-songwriter.

== Career ==
Between 2006 and 2008, she was part of Caramelitus duo with Tomás Preuss. The group duo composed pop electronical music and received good critics from specialized newspapers.

She became famous after the release of her first album Almismotiempo ("At-the-same-time") in 2009. She was nominated the same year for a Latin Grammy in the Best Alternative Song category for her single "Millones". Her voice, folk style and lyrics have been regarded by many as continuing the legacy of Violeta Parra, widely considered to be the most influential Chilean folklorist. Moreno has been called the "Chilean revelation of organic rock" by Petit Indie.

The album Mala Madre was offered for free on June 4, 2015. It was downloaded 73,500 times over the 24 hours that it was made available on her website, a record in her country. Moreno described the album as a tribute to the different women she admires such as Cecilia Vicuña, Violeta Parra and Gabriela Mistral. In the 2016 edition of the Pulsar Awards, Moreno won the awards for Best Pop Artist, Song of the Year and Album of the Year. She is known for her visually creative music videos.

In February 2019, she revived her duo Caramelitus with Tomás Preuss on the occasion of Womad festival.

During 2019, she presented her new project, Pangea, which included two new albums, several concerts and the release of a documentary (also named Pangea) directed by Alberto Hayden.

During October and November 2019, during the social crisis, she participated in several improvised concerts and criticized the military repression.

== Personal life ==
She is the daughter of journalist and director Rodrigo Moreno.

She gave birth to her son in 2017. In 2019, she revealed in an interview that she is in a relationship with a woman.

== Discography ==
=== Solo albums ===
- 2009 – Almismotiempo
- 2010 – Opmeitomsimla
- 2012 – Panal
- 2015 – Mala madre
- 2019 – Pangea
- 2019 – Pangea (Vol. 2)
- 2021 – Rey

=== With Caramelitus ===
- 2008 – El Otro Hábitat (EP)

=== Bootlegs ===
- 2011 – Partidas, melodías y una canción de cuna
