= Nicole (Chilean singer) =

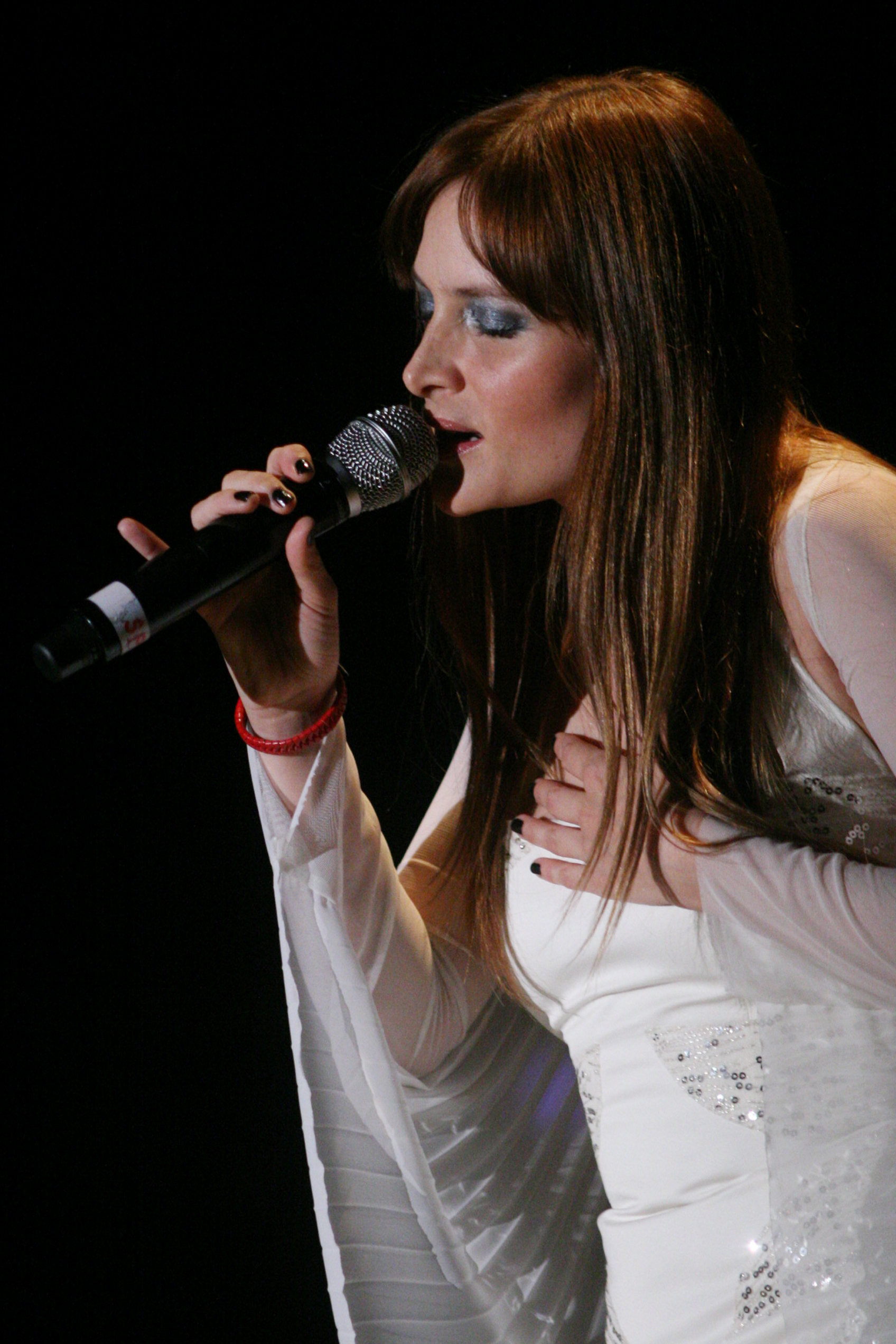

Background information
- Born: Denisse Lillian Laval Soza; January 19, 1977 (age 49)
- Origin: Chile
- Genres: Pop, Rock
- Instruments: Vocals, guitar
- Years active: 1989–present
- Labels: Sony, RCA, Maverick, Warner Bros., Chika Entertainment
- Website: nicolemusica.cl

Denisse Lillian Laval Soza (born January 19, 1977, in Chile), better known by her stage name Nicole, is a Chilean singer-songwriter, based in Santiago.

== Biography ==
Nicole began her career as a child. Her first album Tal vez me estoy enamorando ("Perhaps I'm Falling in Love") was a local success, reaching Gold Status. Years later, at the age of 16, the singer released Esperando nada ("Expecting Nothing"), produced by Tito Dávila (ex Enanitos Verdes), which sold more than 75,000 copies in her country alone. In 1997, Sueños en tránsito ("Dreams in Transit"), produced by Gustavo Cerati, got Nicole recognition in Latin America.

To expand her horizons, Nicole moved to Mexico and later to Miami, Florida, where she met Bruno del Granado, who, upon hearing her, signed Nicole to Madonna’s label: Maverick Música.

== Music career ==
Viaje infinito ("Infinite Journey"), released in 2002, recorded in New York City and produced by Andrés Levin, received a Latin Grammy nomination for Best Female Pop Vocal Album. This album opened the door for Nicole to play alongside musical heavyweights, including the legendary band Chicago in the World Music Jam held in Radio City Hall. She sang with them the unforgettable If You Leave Me Now.

During this time, Nicole played roles in two cinematographic productions: La Amiga ("The Friend") (USA), and Se Arrienda ("For Rent") (Chile). The films were recognized in various film festivals throughout the world.

Currently, Nicole is promoting her most recent album entitled Apt. ("apartment"), produced by Jimmy Frazier and Nicole, released in July 2006 under her own label called "Chika Entertainment Inc." The album's first single is Si Vienes por Mi (Should you Come for Me). The second single to be released from this album is "Veneno" (Poison), which has become more successful than the first single.

== Discography ==
- Tal vez me estoy enamorando (1989)
- Esperando nada (1994)
- Sueños en tránsito (1997)
- Viaje infinito (2002)
- Apt. (2006)
- 20 años (2010)
- Panal (2013)
- 30 años - Volumen 1 (2019)
- 30 años - Volumen 2 (2019)
- 30 años - Volumen 3 (2019)
- Claroscuro (2022)
