= Premios Pulsar =

Music awards presented in Chile

Pulsar Awards
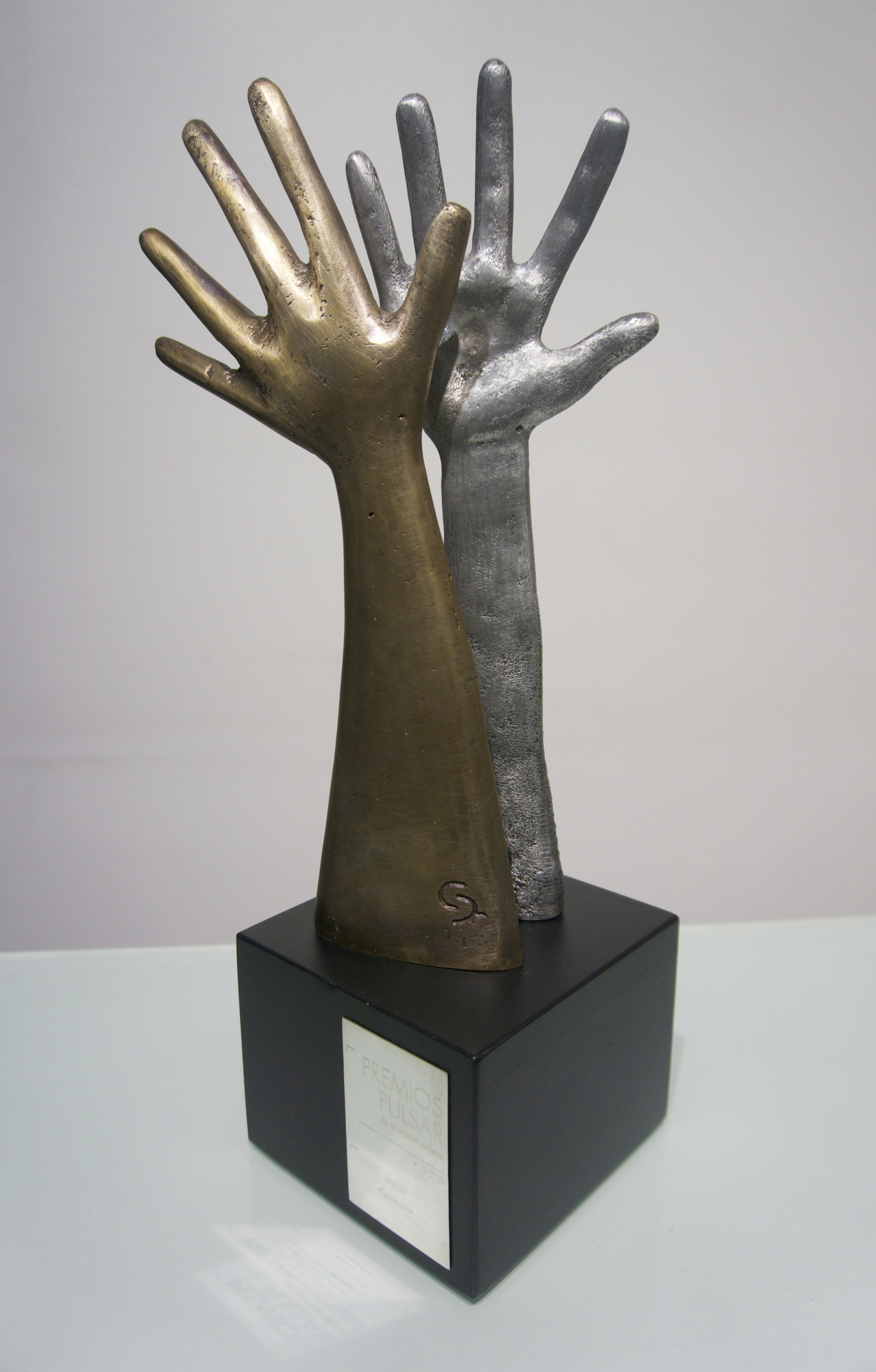
- Award trophy.
- Awarded for: Excellence in Chilean music releases.
- Sponsored by: Sociedad Chilena del Derecho de Autor (SCD)
- Date: 28 July 2015
- Country: Chile
- Website: www.premiospulsar.cl/sitio/

Television/radio coverage
- Network: La Red (2015-2016, 2019, 2021-2022); TVN (2017-2018, 2023)

The Premios Pulsar (English: Pulsar Awards) is an award ceremony presented annually by the Sociedad Chilena del Derecho de Autor (SCD) to recognize the best in Chilean music releases. It includes categories for albums, songs, music videos and music-related books and other publications.

The first awards ceremony was held on 25 July 2015, at Teatro Nescafé de las Artes in Santiago. Chilean television presented Ignacio Franzani served as host while La Red and Radio Cooperativa broadcast the ceremony on television and radio, respectively.

== Background ==
The awards were created in 2015, intended to highlight musical releases in the country. The name comes from the "Feria Pulsar", an annual event organized by the Sociedad Chilena del Derecho de Autor that takes place in Santiago and includes activities such as concerts and music-related exhibitions.

Prior to the awards inception, the Altazor Awards were presented, from 2000 to 2014, to recognize the best in Chilean literature, visual arts, theater, dance, music, cinema and television. The Sociedad Chilena del Derecho de Autor were one of the institutions involved in said awards.

The winners and nominees are chosen by a set of juries that changes for each edition. The jury members range from musicians, journalists, producers, engineers, music video directors, art directors, among other professionals from the music industry. Winners and nominees for all the categories are selected by the juries except Artist of the Year, which is voted by the public through the awards website, and Most Played Song, which is determined through the statistics given by Chilean radio stations.

== Trophy ==
The trophy was designed by Chilean sculptor Catalina Rojas and was named "El Aplauso" (The Clap). It was created through lost-wax casting and consists of two hands, one painted silver and the other gold. According to Rojas, it represents the connexion between the artist and the audience through the act of clapping while the different materials in the hands represent the need for diversity in music.

== Categories ==
As of 2023, the following 26 categories are presented:

=== Current categories ===
- Artist of the Year
- Song of the Year
- Album of the Year
- Record of the Year (since 2022)
- Best New Artist
- Best Pop Artist
- Best Rock Artist
- Best Urban Music Artist
- Best Metal Artist
- Best Tropical Music and Ranchera Artist
- Best Electronic Music Artist
- Best Fusion Artist (since 2017; presented biannually since 2021)
- Best Jazz Artist (since 2017; presented biannually since 2021)
- Best Singer-Songwriter
- Best Roots Music Artist
- Best Children's' Music Artist (presented biannually)
- Best Classical Music Artist
- Best Record Producer (since 2016)
- Instrumentalist of the Year
- Best Visual Media Composer
- Best Music Video
- Best Cover Art (presented biannually)
- Best Music-Related Book (presented biannually)
- Dissemination of Music of the Indigenous Peoples Award (presented biannually)
- SCD Award for Most Played Song
- Special Award for Promotion of Chilean Music

=== Defunct categories ===
- Best Tropical Music Artist (2015-2020)
- Best Jazz Fusion Artist (2015-2016, 2018-2020)
- Best Pop Ballad Artist (2015-2018)
- Best Visual Media Related to Music (2015-2016)

== Ceremonies ==
Year	Date	Venue	City	Host	Broadcast		Ref.
Year	Date	Venue	City	Host	Television	Radio	Ref.
1st	18 July 2015	Teatro Nescafé de las Artes	Santiago	(Chile) Ignacio Franzani	La Red	Radio Cooperativa	
2nd	10 May 2016	Teatro Teletón	Santiago	(Chile) Ignacio Franzani	La Red	Radio Cooperativa	
3rd	31 May 2017	Teatro Teletón	Santiago	(Chile) Cristián Sánchez	TVN	Radio Bío-Bío	
4th	12 & 14 June 2018	Sala SCD, Plaza Egaña; Studio 1, TVN	Santiago	(Chile) Alfredo Lewin	TVN	Radio Bío-Bío	
5th	9 July 2019	Teatro Teletón	Santiago	(Chile) Eduardo Fuentes	La Red	Radio Bío-Bío	
6th	15 July 2020	Streaming		(Chile) Humberto Sichel (Chile) Javiera Contador (Chile) Natalia Valdevenido	Súbela Radio		
7th	9 June 2021	Streaming		(Chile) Eduardo Fuentes	La Red	Radio Bio-Bío	
8th	30 May 2022	Centro Cultural Estación Mapocho	Santiago	(Chile) Eduardo Fuentes	La Red	Radio Bio-Bío	
9th	4 June 2023	Studio 1, TVN	Santiago	(Chile) Eduardo Fuentes (Chile) Ivette Vergara	TVN	Radio Bio-Bío	
10th	6 June 2024	Studio 1, TVN	Santiago	(Chile) Eduardo Fuentes	TVN	Radio Bio-Bío	

== Selected winners ==
The following table features the winners for the four main categories.

Year	Artist of the Year	Album of the Year	Song of the Year	Best New Artist	Ref.
2015	Ana Tijoux	Ana Tijoux – Vengo	Ana Tijoux – "Vengo"	Benjamín Walker	
2016	La Combo Tortuga	Camila Moreno – Mala Madre	Camila Moreno – "Tu Mamá Te Mató"	Niños del Cerro	
2017	Villa Cariño	Alex Anwandter – Amiga	Alex Anwandter – "Siempre es Viernes en Mi Corazón"	300am	
2018	Movimiento Original	Congreso – La Canción Que Te Debía	Mon Laferte – "Amárrame"	Niña Tormenta	
2019	La Comba Tortuga	Mon Laferte – Norma	Paloma Mami – "Not Steady"	La Brígida Orquesta	
2020	Cami	Como Asesinar a Felipes – Naturaleza Muerta	Cami – "Aquí Estoy"	Simón Campusano	
2021	DrefQuila	Francisca Valenzuela – La Fortaleza	Francisca Valenzuela – "Flotando"	Pau	
2022	La Combo Tortuga	Camila Moreno – Rey	Yorka featuring Gepe and Lido Pimienta – "Viento"	Soulfia	
2023	Paula Rivas	Congreso – Luz de Flash	Polimá Westcoast and Pailita – "Ultra Solo"	Fran Quintero	
2024	Los Bunkers	Mon Laferte – Autopoiética	Los Bunkers – "Rey"	Asia Menor	

== See also ==
- Altazor Award
