= Reluciente, Rechinante y Aterciopelado =

Live album by Aterciopelados
- Released: April 22, 2016
- Genre: Rock en español
- Length: 46:21
- Label: Sony Music
- Producer: Rafael Arcaurte

Aterciopelados chronology
Rio (2008)	Reluciente, Rechinante y Aterciopelado (2016)	Claroscura (2018)

Singles from Reluciente, Rechinante y Aterciopelado
- 1. "Luz Azul" Released: October 16, 2015; 2. "Florecita Rockera" Released: March 8, 2016; 3. "Maligno" Released: July 13, 2016

Reluciente, Rechinante y Aterciopelado is the first live album by Colombian band Aterciopelados. It was recorded before a live audience of 140 guests in Bogotá, Colombia, on June 2, 2015 and released as a CD and DVD on April 22, 2016. Directed by Roberto de Zubiría and produced by Rafael Arcaurte the album includes featured performances by León Larregui, Spanish singer Macaco, Goyo (ChocQuibTown) and Catalina García (Monsieur Perine).

The proposal to record a concert film came from Sony Music Colombia after the band's comeback concert at Rock al Parque 2014. After almost two months of rehearsals the concert was recorded. The album contains songs from their previous albums El Dorado, La Pipa de la Paz, Caribe Atómico and Gozo Poderoso as well as songs from solo projects by the members of the band. As of July 2017, the DVD has been certified Gold in Colombia, denoting 5,000 copies sold.

== Recording and scenery ==
The musical pre-production was carried out in Tigo Music Studios by Audiovisión, the studio where the band recorded some of their most well-known works. The concert took place in RTI studios, which was illuminated with lamps made out of 810 bottles of detergent and softeners, a large velvet heart, a tree made of tires and plastic caps, and CDs that served as a framework on the steps. Juan Garces was in charge of the scenery.

The recording consisted of two sessions totaling approximately three hours. The first, beginning with Baracunatana, included El Estuche, El Álbum and Rompecabezas. They then go ahead into a couple solo songs, Soy La Semilla Nativa from Niños Cristal by Buitrago and Yo, one of the most glittering hits from the album Dos by Echeverri. The second session contains an unreleased track called Re which is a tribute to the Mexican band Café Tacuba. It consists of sets of words with the "Re" syllable and a Norteño melody. For the interpretation of Maligno, León Larregui of the band Zoé and Colombian bandoneon player Giovanni Parra were invited to perform with them. Bolero Falaz, Luz Azul with Spanish singer Macaco and Florecita Rockera with Goyo of ChocQuibTown and Catalina Garcia of Monsieur Perine closed off this block. At the end, La Estaca was performed as a gift to the public, however it is not included in any format of the release.

== Track listing ==
No.	Title	Writer(s)	Length
1.	"Baracunatana"	Leonidas Plaza	2:43
2.	"El estuche"	Echeverri	3:05
3.	"El álbum"	Echeverri	4:05
4.	"Rompecabezas" (with Marco Antonio Farinango of Kapiri Walka)	Echeverri	4:57
5.	"Soy La Semilla Nativa" (from Niños Cristal by Héctor Buitrago)	Buitrago	3:22
6.	"Yo" (from Dos by Andrea Echeverri)	Echeverri	3:27
7.	"Re" (homage to Re by Café Tacvba)	Echeverri	4:03
8.	"Maligno" (feat. León Larregui of Zoé)	Buitrago, Echeverri	4:34
9.	"Bolero falaz"	Buitrago, Echeverri	4:45
10.	"Luz azul" (feat. Macaco)	Buitrago, Echeverri	4:26
11.	"Florecita rockera" (feat. Goyo and Catalina García)	Buitrago	6:54

== Personnel ==
Musicians

- Andrea Echeverri: vocals, rhythm guitar
- Héctor Buitrago: bass, backing vocals
- Gregorio Merchán: drums
- Leonardo Castiblanco: guitar
- Natalia Pazos: percussion and chorus
- Catalina Ávila: percussion and chorus

Additional musicians

- Marco Antonio Farinango: winds
- Giovanni Parra: bandoneon
- León Larregui: vocals and chorus
- Macaco: vocals and chorus
- Goyo: vocals and chorus
- Catalina García: vocals and chorus

Recording personnel

- Rafael Arcaute: producer
- Rafa Sardina: mixing
- Paula Pérez: wardrobe
- Roberto de Zubiría: film director
- Roberto León: film technical team
- Mauricio Pardo: film technical team

Artwork

- Art Direction: Beatriz Leal and Juan Garcés
- Design and diagrams: Andrea Hermida and La Post
- Illustration: Andrea Hermida, Andrea Echeverri, Juan Andrés Moreno, Santiago Uribe, La Post
- Photography: Juan Andrés Moreno, Giancarlo Barco
