= Río (Aterciopelados album) =

Studio album by Aterciopelados
- Released: October 21, 2008
- Recorded: 2008
- Genres: Rock en español Colombian rock Alternative rock Art rock
- Length: 50:34
- Label: Nacional Records
- Producer: Héctor Buitrago

Aterciopelados chronology
Lo Esencial (2007)	Río (2008)	Reluciente, Rechinante y Aterciopelado (2016)

Río is the seventh studio album by Colombian band Aterciopelados, released in 2008. The album is environmentally themed, lamenting the pollution of the Bogotá River. In 2012, Rolling Stone ranked it number 6 on its list of The 10 Greatest Latin Rock Albums of All Time. It was nominated at the 52nd Annual Grammy Awards for Best Latin Rock/Alternative or Urban Album.

== Artwork ==
The cover art for the album features a graffiti piece made entirely with water paints and using no aerosol. It depicts an ancestral anaconda, the mother of humanity according to the indigenous people and symbol of the river, used as a metaphor for the recovery of the Bogotá River.

== Album ==
Released after one year off following the release of Oye, Río maintains several features of its predecessor plus some reminiscences of La Pipa de la Paz. Río has a conceptual and lyrical theme of environmental awareness, the sound of running water fills the void between the songs and conveys the message, reinforcing the concept of environmental awareness. When the album touches on non-environmental problems, the lyrics remain politically committed and socially conscious.

The music in Río consists of grooving, guitar-driven rock with crisp drums, drawing comparisons to New Wave bands like The Police and Talking Heads while regularly drawing on local traditional rhythms and instruments from Colombia and beyond. An Andean folk group contributes on two songs, and we hear the whoops of a village party mixed into the lilting No Llores. The songs deal with local realities in Colombia. The title track laments the despoiling of the country's rivers, this message continues into the second song Treboles and Mother which is an ode to mother nature. 28 conveys the maternal experience in a natural and sentimental way. The song Día Paranormal aims to raise awareness about serious and diverse problems that afflict the world and the lack of importance given by the media to the collective unconscious. The lyrics of Gratis convey the message of equality between brothers with Rock and Roll sounds. In a clear conceptual twist in the album, Bandera criticizes the conditions and treatment received by illegal immigrants in the most developed countries and speaks out against strict immigration policies that make it harder for ordinary folks from a place like Colombia to travel the world. It was composed after the many problems the band had trying to enter Spain. The childish but subtle Ataque de Risa, featuring Andrea's daughter Milagros in backup vocals, imparts the importance of non-violence and changing negative energy for positive energy, exchanging weapons and war with laughter, beauty and tolerance. Hijos de Tigre refers to the hereditary character of violence in Colombia, this song was composed for the soundtrack to the film La Milagrosa, a film about the Colombian armed conflict led by renowned Mexican director Rafa Lara.

== Critical reception ==
Professional ratings
Review scores
Source	Rating
Allmusic	4/5 stars
Paste	9/10 stars

Río received generally positive reviews from music critics. Mario Iván Oña of The Washington Post commended them for once again changing their sound for a new album and for their songwriting. Saying "Lyrically, though, they've never sounded more responsible -- parenthood tends to do that. They champion immigrants, the environment and motherhood. It's not that firecracker lyricist Andrea Echeverri -- expecting her second child -- has newly found indignation. She's always been ornery. But this time, her spunkiness is cool, contemplative, mature and poetic, as well as unabashedly confrontational." "Andrea Echeverri ponders subjects like immigration and pregnancy, projecting unflappable confidence. Meanwhile, the band adds a slew of spiffy touches" said Jon Young of Spin "a toe-tapping study in cultural cross-pollination."

Jon Pareles wrote in The New York Times that the album has a "new tinge of urgency" and "it’s in the way Andrea Echeverri’s ever-optimistic voice adds an undertone of determination as she sings lyrics that celebrate nature and the body yet worry about the state of the environment and human violence. Reflective but never dour, and serious about staying hopeful." Banning Eyre said on NPR "Hector Buitrago's entrancing guitar melodies and Andrea Echeverri's raggedly tuneful vocal flights are so seductive that the language barrier melts away on its own" and "I can't remember when a CD offered so many melodies you just want to curl up with and caress."

== Track listing ==
All tracks are written by Aterciopelados.

No.	Title	Length
1.	"Río"	4:09
2.	"Tréboles"	3:16
3.	"28" (feat. Goyo)	3:34
4.	"Día paranormal"	4:01
5.	"Gratis"	4:27
6.	"Vals"	4:27
7.	"Madre"	5:25
8.	"Bandera"	2:37
9.	"Ataque de risa"	3:21
10.	"Hijos de tigre"	3:32
11.	"No llores"	4:20
12.	"Tomate"	3:41
13.	"Agüita"	3:44
Total length:		50:34

== Personnel ==
Aterciopelados

- Andrea Echeverri - vocals, rhythm guitar
- Héctor Buitrago - bass, backing vocals, guitar

Additional musicians

- Ricardo Fernández - guitar
- Goyo - covocalist
- Kapary Walka - Andean music
- Paito - bagpipes
- Mauricio Montenegro - drums
- Urián Sarmiento - drums, goblet drum, bagpipes, llamador, Maracones, tabla, tambora
- Camilo Velásquez - guitar and backing vocals

Recording personnel

- Héctor Castillo - mixing
- Mike Marsh - mastering

Artwork

- Hogar, Bastardilla, Fernando Restrepo - Artwork
