= Grammy Award for Best Latin Rock or Alternative Album =

Grammy Award category

- Papota by Ca7riel & Paco Amoroso is the most recent recipient
- Awarded for: Best Latin rock or Latin alternative albums
- Country: United States
- Presented by: National Academy of Recording Arts and Sciences
- First award: 1998
- Currently held by: Ca7riel & Paco Amoroso – Papota (2026)
- Website: grammy.com

The Grammy Award for Best Latin Rock or Alternative Album (until 2020: Best Latin Rock, Urban or Alternative Album) is an award presented at the Grammy Awards, a ceremony that was established in 1958 and originally called the Gramophone Awards, to recording artists for releasing albums in the Latin rock and/or alternative genres. Honors in several categories are presented at the ceremony annually by the National Academy of Recording Arts and Sciences of the United States to "honor artistic achievement, technical proficiency and overall excellence in the recording industry, without regard to album sales or chart position".

The category was introduced in 1998 and has gone through a number of name changes:

- 1998-2008: Grammy Award for Best Latin Rock/Alternative Performance
- 2009-2011: Grammy Award for Best Latin Rock, Alternative or Urban Album (for which this category merged with the Latin Urban Album category)
- 2012: No Grammy was awarded (Grammy category was discontinued in a major overhaul of Grammy categories. That year, recordings in this category were shifted to the newly formed Best Latin Pop, Rock or Urban Album category. )
- 2013-2020: Grammy Award for Best Latin Rock, Urban or Alternative Album
- 2021 onwards: Grammy Award for Best Latin Rock or Alternative Album

In June 2020, the Recording Academy announced a renaming and redefining of this category. Latin urban albums were moved to the newly named Best Latin Pop or Urban Album category, as the Academy stated that "the Latin urban genre, both aesthetically and musically, is much more closely related to the current state of Latin pop."

== Recipients ==
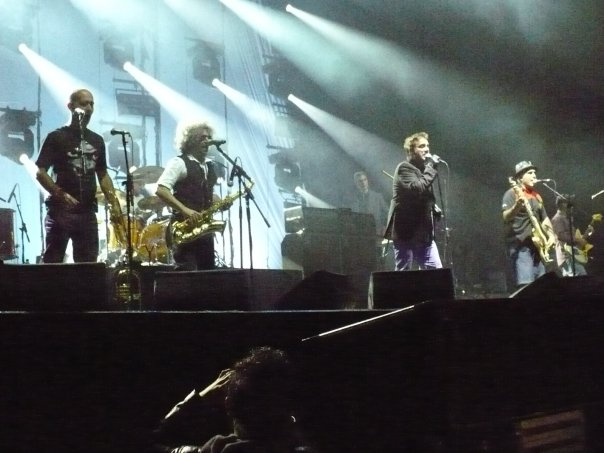
Argentine band Los Fabulosos Cadillacs was the first recipient of the award.

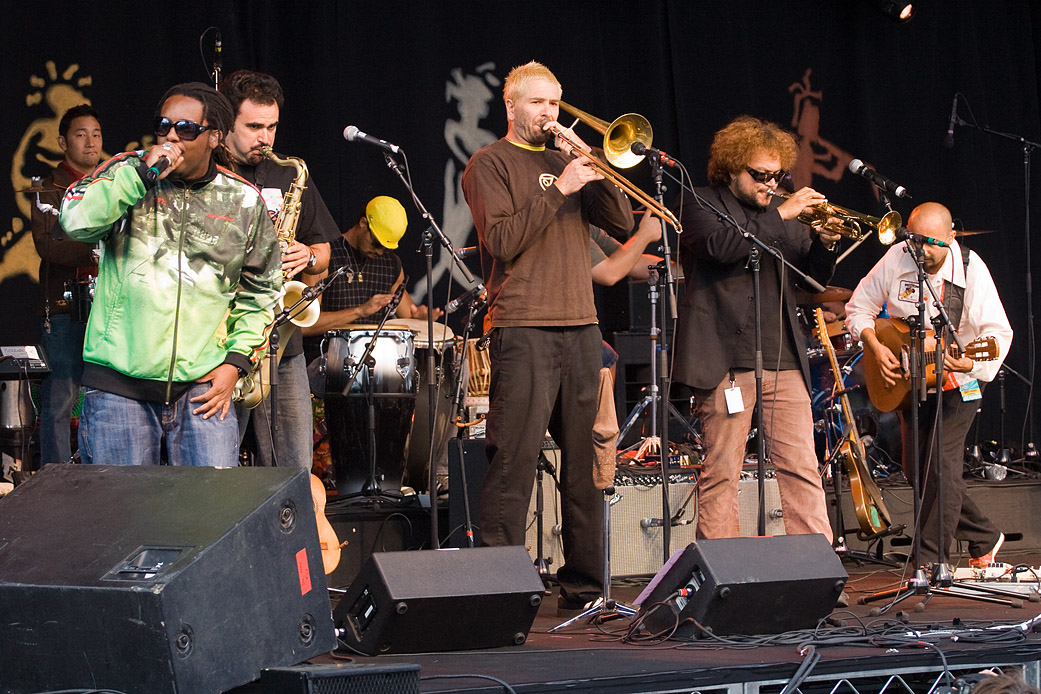
Two-time winners Ozomatli.

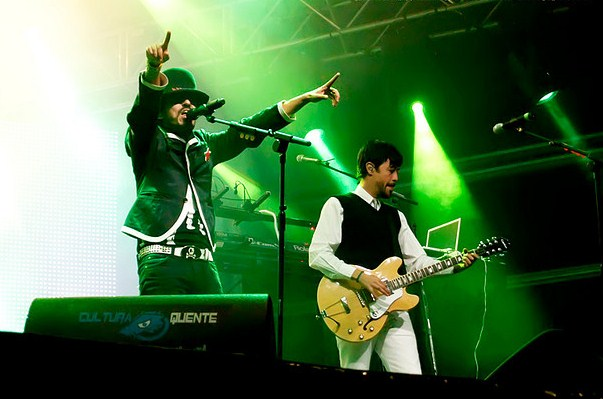
2004 winners, Mexican band Café Tacuba.

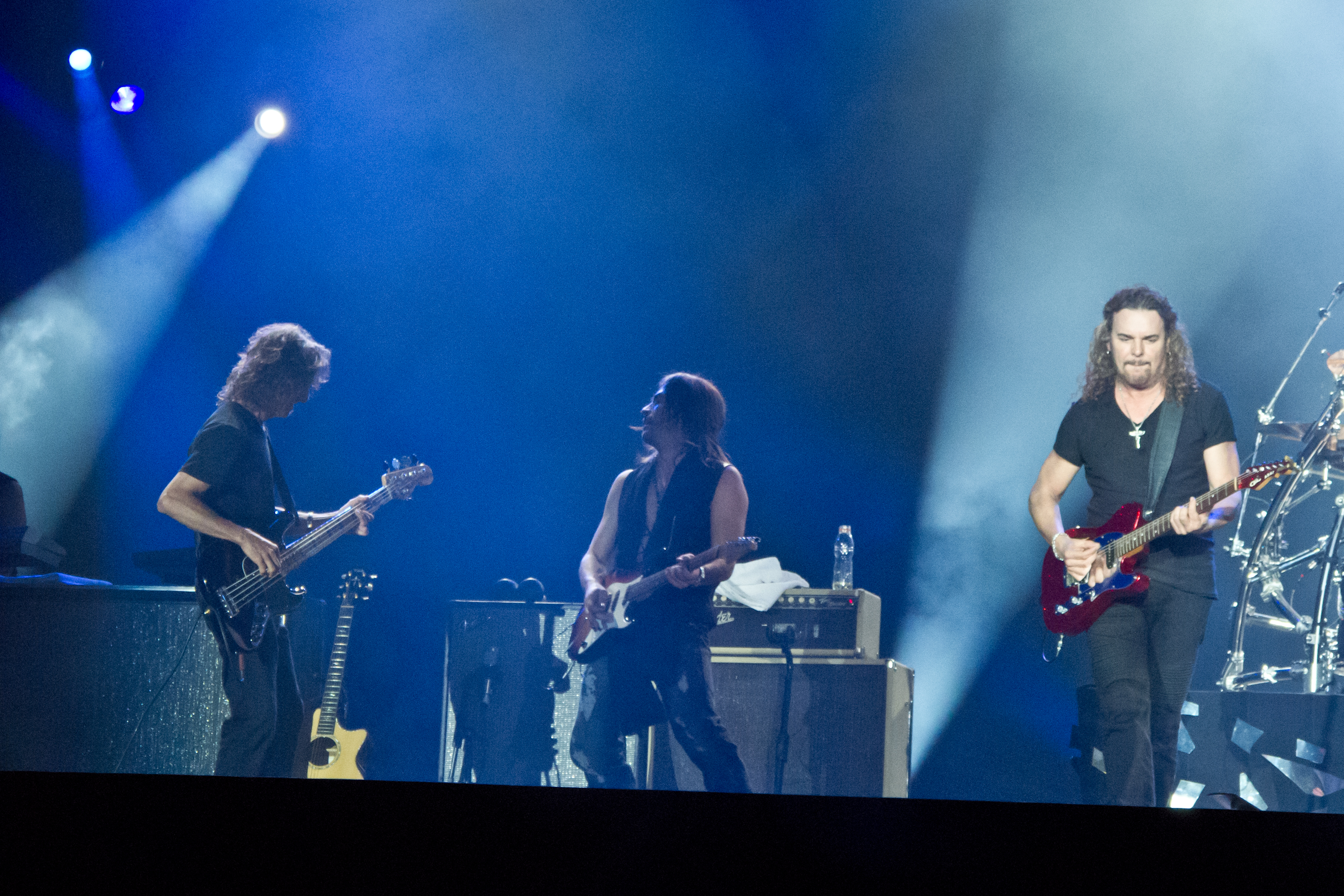
Three-time winner, Mexican band Maná.

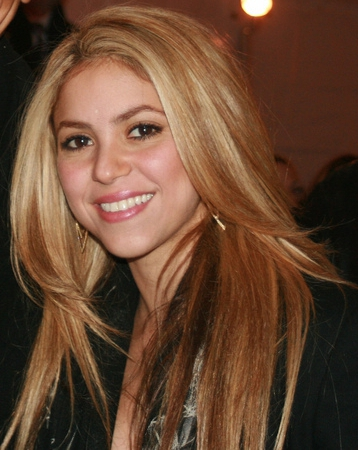
2006 winner, Colombian singer Shakira.

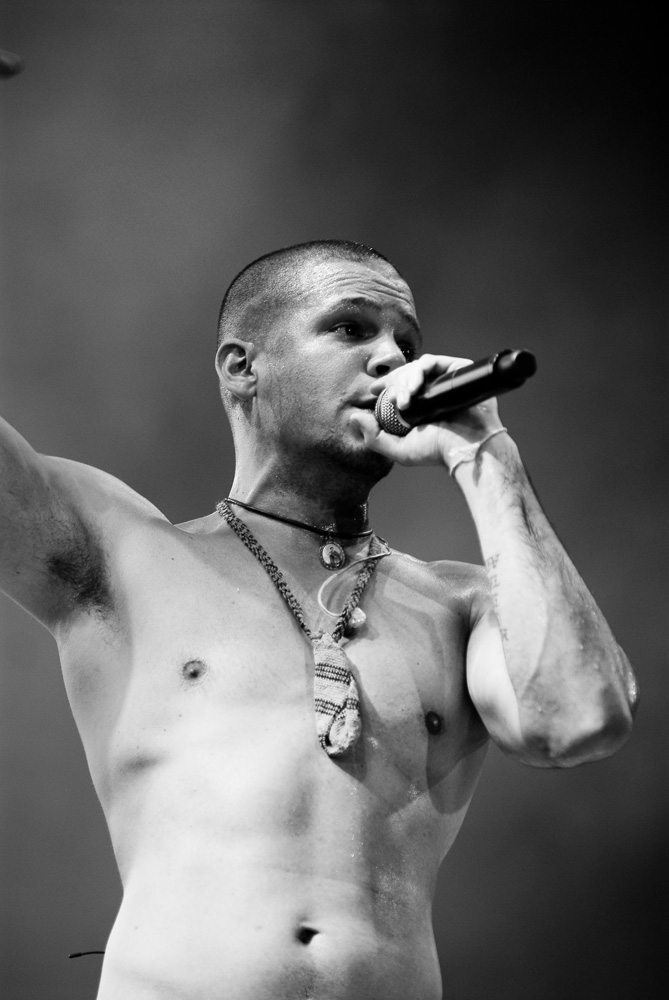
Residente from the two-time award winning band Calle 13.

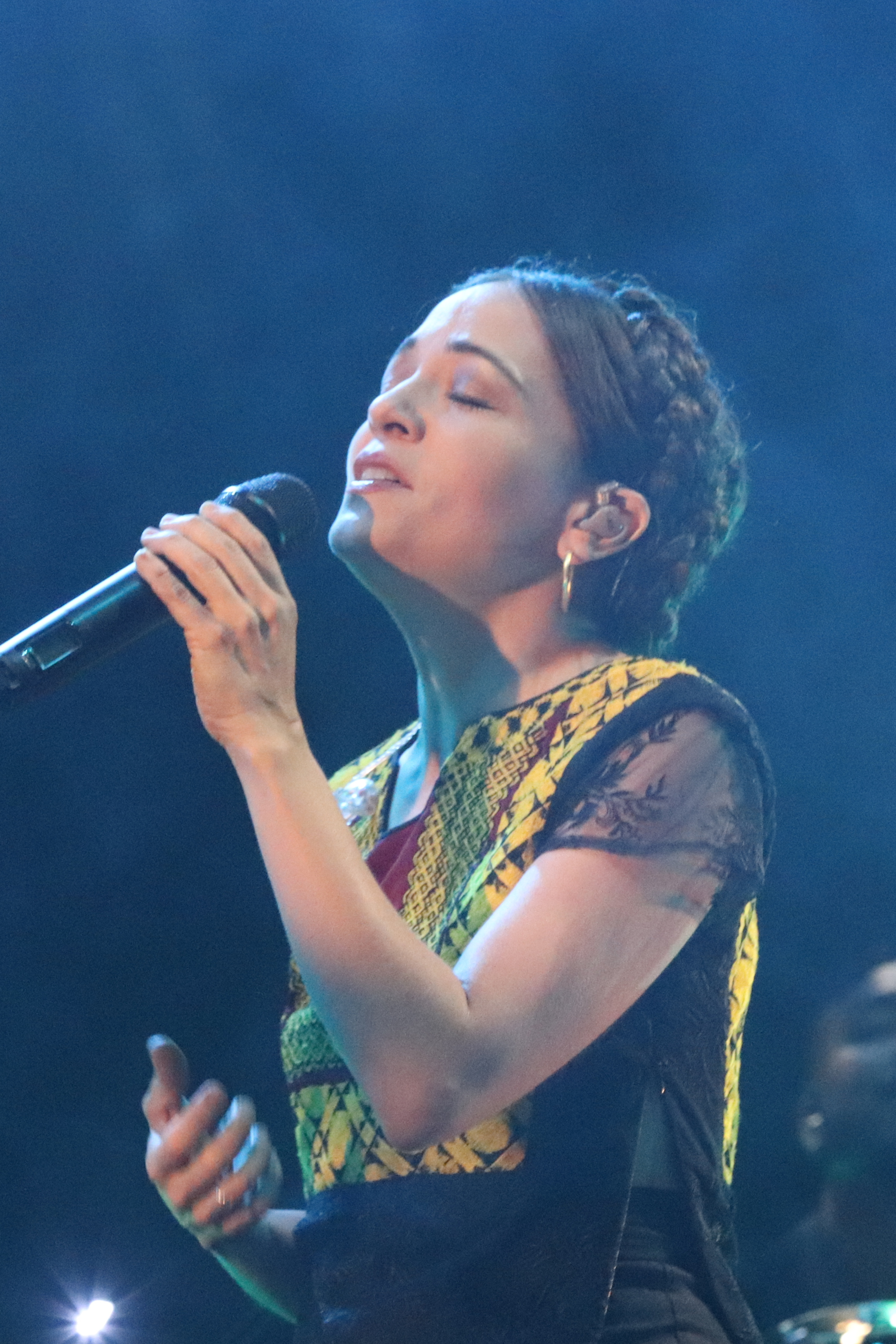
Two time winner, Mexican singer Natalia Lafourcade in 2016 and 2024.

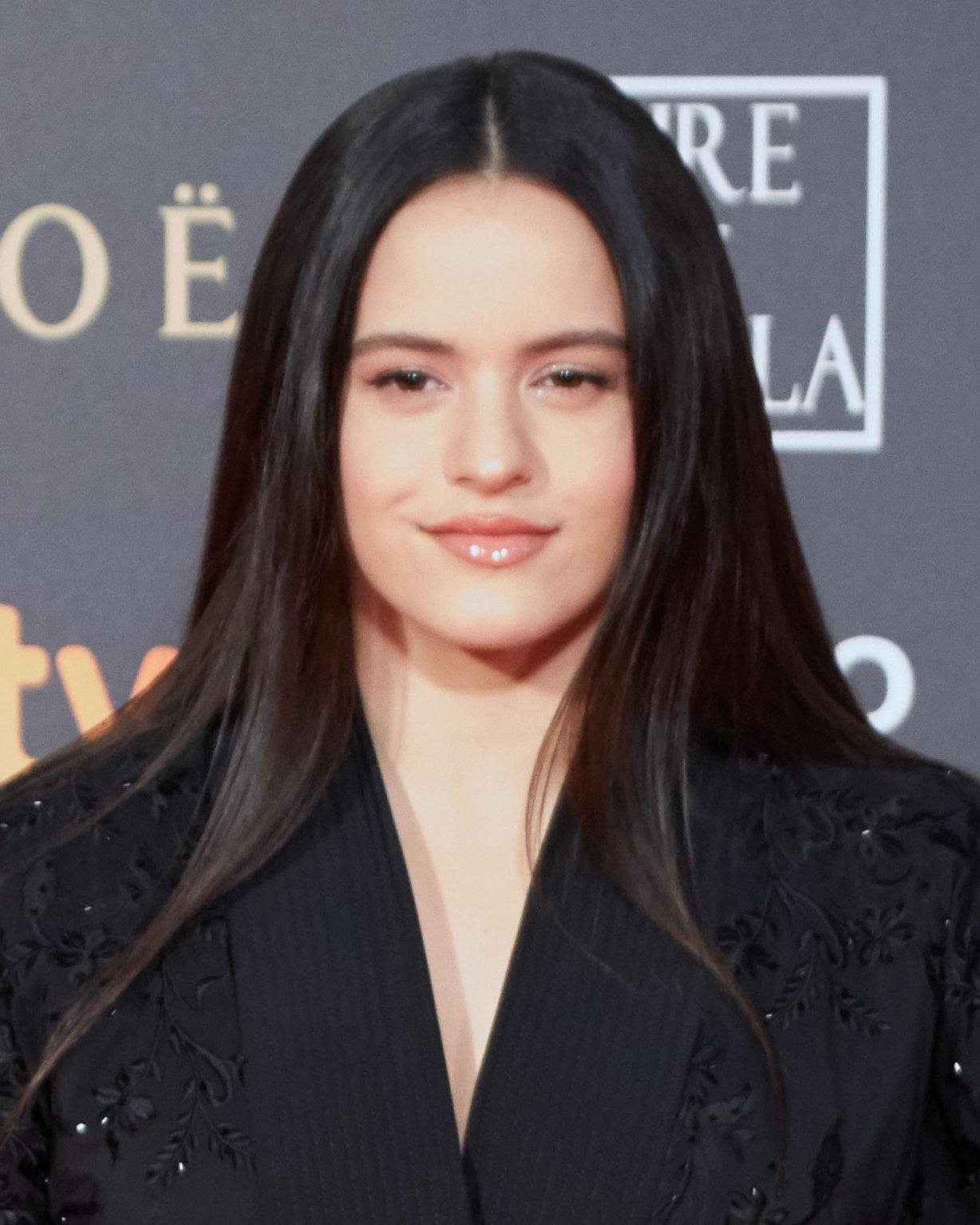
Spanish singer Rosalía is the first solo artist to win this award twice in 2020 and 2023.

=== 1990s ===
Year	Work	Artist
1998
1998	Fabulosos Calavera	Los Fabulosos Cadillacs
1998	Avalancha de Éxitos	Café Tacuba
1998	Cuando Tú No Estás	El Tri
1998	¿Dónde Jugarán las Niñas?	Molotov
1998	La Pipa de la Paz	Aterciopelados
1999
1999	Sueños Líquidos	Maná
1999	Caribe Atómico	Aterciopelados
1999	Dónde Están los Ladrones?	Shakira
1999	Fin de Siglo	El Tri
1999	Tracción Acústica	Enanitos Verdes

=== 2000s ===
Year	Work	Artist
2000
2000	Resurrection	Chris Pérez Band
2000	Bajo el Azul de Tu Misterio	Jaguares
2000	La Marcha del Golazo Solitario	Los Fabulosos Cadillacs
2000	Néctar	Enanitos Verdes
2000	Revés/Yo Soy	Café Tacuba
2001
2001	Uno	La Ley
2001	Abre	Fito Páez
2001	Arepa 3000	Los Amigos Invisibles
2001	La Extraordinaria Paradoja del Sonido Quijano	Café Quijano
2001	No Podemos Volar	El Tri
2002
2002	Embrace the Chaos	Ozomatli
2002	Cuando la Sangre Galopa	Jaguares
2002	Fíjate Bien	Juanes
2002	Gozo Poderoso	Aterciopelados
2002	Próxima Estación: Esperanza	Manu Chao
2003
2003	Revolución de Amor	Maná
2003	Un Día Normal	Juanes
2003	Emigrante	Orishas
2003	Kinky	Kinky
2003	Un Paso a la Eternidad	Sindicato Argentino del Hip Hop
2004
2004	Cuatro Caminos	Café Tacuba
2004	Dance and Dense Denso	Molotov
2004	President Alien	Yerba Buena
2004	Proyecto Akwid	Akwid
2004	Siempre Es Hoy	Gustavo Cerati
2005
2005	Street Signs	Ozomatli
2005	Komp 104.9 Radio Compa	Akwid
2005	Lipstick	Alejandra Guzmán
2005	Mi Sangre	Juanes
2005	Sí	Julieta Venegas
2006
2006	Fijación Oral, Vol. 1	Shakira
2006	Con Todo Respeto	Molotov
2006	Consejo	La Secta AllStar
2006	Desahogo	Vico C
2006	El Kilo	Orishas
2007
2007	Amar es Combatir	Maná
2007	Calle 13	Calle 13
2007	Lo Demás es Plástico	Black Guayaba
2007	Super Pop Venezuela	Los Amigos Invisibles
2007	The Underdog/El Subestimado	Tego Calderón
2008
2008	No Hay Espacio	Black Guayaba
2008	Adelantando	Jarabe de Palo
2008	Amantes Sunt Amentes	Panda
2008	Kamikaze	Los Rabanes
2008	Memo Rex Commander y el Corazón Atómico de la Vía Láctea	Zoé
2009
2009	45	Jaguares
2009	Mediocre	Ximena Sariñana
2009	Sonidos Gold	Grupo Fantasma
2009	Tijuana Sound Machine	Nortec Collective Presents: Bostich+Fussible
2009	La Verdad	Locos Por Juana

=== 2010s ===
Year	Work	Artist
2010
2010	Los de Atrás Vienen Conmigo	Calle 13
2010	La Luz del Ritmo	Los Fabulosos Cadillacs
2010	La Revolución	Wisin & Yandel
2010	Río	Aterciopelados
2010	Y.	Bebe
2011
2011	El Existential	Grupo Fantasma
2011	1977	Ana Tijoux
2011	Amor Vincit Omnia	Draco
2011	Bulevard 2000	Nortec Collective Presents: Bostich+Fussible
2011	Oro	ChocQuibTown
2013
2013	Imaginaries	Quetzal
2013	La Bala	Ana Tijoux
2013	Campo	Campo
2013	Déjenme Llorar	Carla Morrison
2013	Electro-Jarocho	Sistema Bomb
2014
2014	Treinta Días	La Santa Cecilia
2014	Chances	Illya Kuryaki and the Valderramas
2014	El Objeto Antes Llamado Disco	Café Tacuba
2014	Ojo Por Ojo	El Tri
2014	Repeat After Me	Los Amigos Invisibles
2015
2015	Multi Viral	Calle 13
2015	Agua Maldita	Molotov
2015	Bailar en la Cueva	Jorge Drexler
2015	Behind the Machine (Detrás de la Máquina)	ChocQuibTown
2015	Vengo	Ana Tijoux
2016
2016	Dale (TIE)	Pitbull
2016	Hasta la Raíz (TIE)	Natalia Lafourcade
2016	Amanecer	Bomba Estéreo
2016	Caja de Musica	Monsieur Periné
2016	Mondongo	La Cuneta Son Machín
2017
2017	iLevitable	iLe
2017	Amor Supremo	Carla Morrison
2017	Buenaventura	La Santa Cecilia
2017	L.H.O.N. (La Humanidad o Nosotros)	Illya Kuryaki and the Valderramas
2017	Los Rakas	Los Rakas
2018
2018	Residente	Residente
2018	Ayo	Bomba Estéreo
2018	Pa' Fuera	C4 Trío and Desorden Público
2018	El Paradise	Los Amigos Invisibles
2018	Salvavidas de Hielo	Jorge Drexler
2019
2019	Aztlán	Zoé
2019	Claroscura	Aterciopelados
2019	Coastcity	Coastcity
2019	Encanto Tropical	Monsieur Periné
2019	Gourmet	Orishas

=== 2020s ===
Year	Work	Artist
2020
2020	El Mal Querer	Rosalía
2020	Almadura	iLe
2020	Indestructible	Flor de Toloache
2020	Oasis	J Balvin and Bad Bunny
2020	X 100Pre	Bad Bunny
2021
2021	La Conquista del Espacio	Fito Páez
2021	Aura	Bajofondo
2021	Miss Colombia	Lido Pimienta
2021	MONSTRUO	Cami
2021	Sobrevolando	Cultura Profética
2022
2022	Origen	Juanes
2022	Calambre	Nathy Peluso
2022	Deja	Bomba Estéreo
2022	El Madrileño	C. Tangana
2022	Mira Lo Que Me Hiciste Hacer (Deluxe Edition)	Diamante Eléctrico
2022	Sonidos de Karmática Resonancia	Zoé
2023
2023	Motomami	Rosalía
2023	1940 Carmen	Mon Laferte
2023	Alegoría	Gaby Moreno
2023	El Alimento	Cimafunk
2023	Los Años Salvajes	Fito Páez
2023	Tinta y Tiempo	Jorge Drexler
2024
2024	De Todas las Flores (TIE)	Natalia Lafourcade
2024	Vida Cotidiana (TIE)	Juanes
2024	EADDA9223	Fito Páez
2024	Leche de Tigre	Diamante Eléctrico
2024	Martínez	Cabra
2025
2025	¿Quién Trae las Cornetas?	Rawayana
2025	Autopoiética	Mon Laferte
2025	Compita del Destino	El David Aguilar
2025	Grasa	Nathy Peluso
2025	Pa'Tu Cuerpa	Cimafunk
2026
2026	Papota	Ca7riel & Paco Amoroso
2026	Algorhythm	Los Wizzards
2026	Astropical	Bomba Estéreo and Rawayana (Astropical)
2026	Genes Rebeldes	Aterciopelados
2026	Novela	Fito Páez
2027
2027	Free Spirits	Ca7riel & Paco Amoroso
2027	JuanesTeban	Juanes
2027	La Vida Era Más Corta	Milo J
2027	Shine	Fito Páez
2027	Taracá	Jorge Drexler

- ^{^[I]} Each year is linked to the article about the Grammy Awards held that year.

== Artists with multiple wins ==
3 wins

- Maná

2 wins

- Calle 13
- Juanes
- Natalia Lafourcade
- Ozomatli
- Rosalía

== Artists with multiple nomination ==
6 nominations

- Aterciopelados
- Juanes
- Fito Páez

4 nominations

- Los Amigos Invisibles
- Bomba Estéreo
- Café Tacuba
- Jorge Drexler
- Molotov
- El Tri

3 nominations

- Calle 13
- Los Fabulosos Cadillacs
- Jaguares
- Maná
- Orishas
- Ana Tijoux
- Zoé

2 nominations

- Akwid
- Bad Bunny
- Black Guayaba
- Ca7riel & Paco Amoroso
- ChocQuibTown
- Cimafunk
- Diamante Eléctrico
- Enanitos Verdes
- Grupo Fantasma
- iLe
- Illya Kuryaki and the Valderramas
- Natalia Lafourcade
- Mon Laferte
- Monsieur Periné
- Carla Morrison
- Nortec Collective Presents: Bostich+Fussible
- Ozomatli
- Nathy Peluso
- Rawayana
- Rosalía
- La Santa Cecilia
- Shakira

== See also ==
- Grammy Award for Best Latin Pop, Rock or Urban Album
