= Evolución (Aterciopelados album) =

Compilation album by Aterciopelados
- Released: October 4, 2002
- Genre: Rock en español
- Length: 62:47
- Producer: Héctor Buitrago

Aterciopelados chronology
Gozo Poderoso (2000)	Evolución (2002)	The Best of Aterciopelados: Ultimate Collection (2004)

Professional ratings
Review scores
Source	Rating
Allmusic	4/5 stars

Evolución is the second compilation album by Colombian band Aterciopelados, released in 2002. This album contains some of the band's biggest hits up until that time, as well as two previously unreleased songs (Mi vida brilla and Tanto amor) and a new version of Florecita Rockera entitled Florecita 2003.

It Includes songs from four of their five studio albums released to date, El Dorado (1995), La Pipa de la Paz (1996), Caribe Atómico (1998) and Gozo Poderoso (2000) as well as a Spanish version of Play the Game originally by Queen that the band recorded for a tribute album in 1997. This album contains no songs from their debut album Con el Corazón en la Mano. It sold over 500,000 copies worldwide.

== Track listing ==
No.	Title	Writer(s)	Length
1.	"Bolero falaz"	Buitrago, Echeverri	3:48
2.	"Florecita rockera"	Buitrago	3:01
3.	"No necesito"	Echeverri	3:49
4.	"La estaca"	Echeverri	2:22
5.	"Baracunatana"	Leonidas Plaza	2:31
6.	"La culpable"	Buitrago, Echeverri	3:21
7.	"El estuche"	Echeverri	3:22
8.	"Juégale, apuéstale" (Play the Game)	Freddie Mercury	2:49
9.	"La pipa de la paz"	Buitrago, Echeverri	4:39
10.	"Caribe atómico"	Buitrago	4:14
11.	"Maligno"	Buitrago, Echeverri	4:09
12.	"El álbum"	Echeverri	3:58
13.	"Luz azul"	Buitrago, Echeverri	4:11
14.	"Rompecabezas"	Buitrago, Echeverri	4:13
15.	"Mi vida brilla"	Buitrago, Echeverri	3:57
16.	"Tanto amor"	Buitrago, Echeverri	3:54
17.	"Florecita 2003"	Buitrago	4:37
