= Oye (Aterciopelados album) =

Studio album by Aterciopelados
- Released: 24 October 2006
- Genres: Pop; Rock en español; Alternative rock; Colombian rock
- Length: 45:01
- Label: Nacional Records
- Producer: Héctor Buitrago

Aterciopelados chronology
Evolución (2002)	Oye (2006)	Lo Esencial (2007)

Professional ratings
Review scores
Source	Rating
Allmusic	4/5 stars

Oye is the sixth album by Colombian rock band Aterciopelados, released on 24 October 2006. The album won the 2007 Latin Grammy Award for Best Alternative Music Album, as well as the Lo Nuestro Award in best rock category, and Nuestra Tierra (2008) for the best rock group and best rock song for "Canción protesta".

== Recording ==
After working solo but with mutual collaboration, the group's leaders Andrea and Héctor announced that Aterciopelados will return in October now under the label Nacional Records, initially confirming the song "Al parque". When recording, the group opted to record with a real drumset, ditching the drum machine present in their recent work, to give Oye a more organic and live album sound, similar to their earlier work. This was the first album without Alejandro Gómez-Cáceres as main guitarist, although he contributed as a colaborator in a few songs.

== Track listing ==
All tracks are written by Aterciopelados.

No.	Title	Length
1.	"Complemento" (Compliment)	2:49
2.	"Que te besen" (Get Kissed)	4:12
3.	"Don Dinero" (Mr. Money)	4:06
4.	"Canción protesta" (Protest Song)	3:03
5.	"Oye mujer" (Hey Woman)	3:51
6.	"Insoportable" (Unbearable)	3:46
7.	"Paces" (Peaces)	4:38
8.	"Panal" (Honeycomb)	3:41
9.	"Al parque" (To the Park)	4:17
10.	"Fan #1" (#1 Fan)	4:07
11.	"Majestad" (Majesty)	1:31
12.	"Cruz de sal" (Salt Cross)	3:27
13.	"Improviso" (I Improvise)	1:33
