= MTV Unplugged (Aterciopelados album) =

Live album (bootleg) by Aterciopelados
- Released: 1997
- Recorded: April 3, 1997
- Venue: Miami Broadcast Center
- Genre: Rock en español Colombian rock Alternative rock Latin alternative

MTV Unplugged is a live performance by Colombian band Aterciopelados, released in 1997. It was recorded before a live audience on April 3 of 1997 at the Miami Broadcast Center in Miami. Aterciopelados was the first Colombian band to record for MTV Unplugged.

== Unofficial album ==
In 1997 Aterciopelados was promoting their new album La Pipa de la Paz. Due to the great reception of the album and successful album sales, MTV Latin America invited the band to hold an Unplugged session where they performed their greatest hits and a few songs from the latest album. Despite the concert being widely considered one of the best of its kind in history, there has not been an official release version of the album to date.

== Track listing ==
No.	Title	Length
1.	"Bolero Falaz"
2.	"Candela"
3.	"Sortilegio"
4.	"Miss Panela"
5.	"Expreso Amazonia"
6.	"Juégale, Apuéstale" (Play the Game)
7.	"Florecita Rockera"
8.	"La Culpable"
9.	"Quemarropa"
10.	"Nada Que Ver"
11.	"Baracunatana"
12.	"No Necesito"
13.	"Cosita Seria"
14.	"La Cuchilla" (Bonus track)

== Accolades ==
Publication	Country	Accolade	Year	Rank	Ref.
BuzzFeed	USA	The definitive ranking of all the MTV Unplugged en Español	2014	23	
Revista Kuadro	Mexico	Top 10 Greatest Unplugged en Español	2015	5	
Rock en las Américas	Latin America	Greatest Unplugged en Español	2009	10	
