= Con el Corazón en la Mano =

Con el Corazón en la Mano may refer to:

- Con el Corazón en la Mano (Aterciopelados album), 1993
- Con el Corazón en la Mano (Rojo album), 2007
