= Evolución =

Evolución may refer to:

- Evolución (band), a band from San José, Costa Rica
- Evolución (Aterciopelados album), 2002
- Evolución (Menudo album), 1984
- Evolución (political coalition), Argentine political party
