= Sin Tu Amor =

Sin Tu Amor may refer to:

- Sin Tu Amor (album), by Los Freddy's
- "Sin tu amor" by Miguel Sandoval (composer), recorded by Luigi Alva, 1963
- "Sin Tu Amor", 2000 song by Pedro Fernández from the album Yo no fui
- "Sin Tu Amor", 2005 song by Ana Gabriel from the album Dos amores un amante
- "Sin Tu Amor", 2005 song by Cristian Castro from the album Dias Felices
- "Sin Tu Amor", 2007 song by Alacranes Musical from the album Ahora y Siempre
- "Sin Tu Amor", 2007 song by Black Guayaba from the album No Hay Espacio
- "Sin Tu Amor" song on album Te Quiero: Romantic Style In Da World, 2007
