= Colombian rock =

Rock music from Colombia

Colombian Rock is rock music from Colombia. The most common styles of Colombian rock are based on Rock en Español, indie rock, as well as the traditional focus of hard rock Colombian bands.

== History ==
In the 1960s a boom in rock music happened in Colombia, as a result of globalization, the influence of the foreign music of that decade, and opposition to the Vietnam War. From that moment in time came the first rock bands in the country. The most famous band in those years where Los Speakers from Bogotá. Their last and most famous album was The Speakers en el maravilloso mundo de Ingeson edited in 1968.

Some bands of the sixties: Los Speakers (1963–1968), Los Flippers (1965–1973), Los Yetis (1965–1969), Los Ampex (1965–1967), Los Young Beats (1966), Los Streaks (1967), Time Machine (1967), The New Movement (founded by Colombo- N.Americans 1966–1968), The Walflower Complextion (founded by North-Americans 1966–1967).

After founding Los Speakers, Humberto Monroy also founded Siglo Cero (1969–1970) and the legendary band Géne-sis (1972–1992) that produced works through the 1970s and 1980s.

In the 1980s, Kraken became the first known heavy metal band in Colombia, as well as the oldest still active band of the country, becoming the progenitors of many rising bands until today. Those included Ekhymosis, from which Juanes split for a solo career.

Bogotá, Medellín and Cali were the cities where this movement started to grow, and they remain today as the main cradles for new groups and styles. Colombian rock is grouped with all Rock en español, a movement led by Argentine rock and Mexican rock.

=== Elsewhere ===
In the 1950s, Medellín, Antioquia, was a middle-sized city in a fast process of industrialization. Elvis Presley and Chuck Berry were the first ambassadors of American rock music. The society of the region, more familiar with one of the main folk musics of Colombia, bambuco, received it with mixed opinions until it became established as part of youth culture.

This musical movement was almost unrecognized in other parts of the country, due to the ongoing boom in literature which marked a "new age" in Colombian culture for the next half century.

Bands like Aterciopelados, Superlitio, 1280 Almas, Agata, Apocalipsys, La Derecha, La Pestilencia, Ultrageno, La severa matacera, Los de Adentro, La Prole Rock, and Leon Bruno have some famous achievements in Latin-American music. The rock scene is beginning to grow as an important part of the Latin American and world music industry.

=== Metal Medallo and ultra metal ===
Along eighties it emerged one of the most representatives Colombian Underground metal scenes known as "Metal Medallo", this one arose in Medellín, creating a representative kind of local metal known as ultra metal (Extreme metal music). This musical scene was characterized by gathering several genres of metal music such as death metal, thrash metal, black metal, and so on; the most representatives bands of this world-class scene were Parabellum, Masacre and Reencarnacion, among others. This metal scene was widely known in this decade in Europe, particularly in Sweden, Norway, Finland and Germany, even Parabellum and Reencarnacion influenced the Early Norwegian black metal scene, moreover was and is broadly known in Japan and North America. Nowadays, this Colombian scene is respected in several countries particularly in underground and old school scenes.

=== Colombian indie and alternative rock ===
Since 2005, Colombia has seen a growth of new punk rock, pop punk, and alternative rock bands. Despite the problems of gaining radio play, bands like Blunt, Tres De Corazon, The Mills, The Hall Effect, Don Tetto, Area 12, Donna Joe Radio, Cygnus, Zarco, Stayway, The Radio Flyer, the Ghetto Muppets, Las Áñez, Proper Strangers (based in the United Kingdom) are starting to become more popular.

Internationally, artists such as The Monas and Locos por Juana (based in Miami) recently nominated to a Grammy award, and Intrudia (based in Texas) have gained notoriety and represent the Colombian Rock in the United States.

== See also ==
- Rock al Parque
