= Andrea Echeverri (album) =

Studio album by Andrea Echeverri
- Released: February 8, 2005
- Length: 46:56
- Label: Nacional Records

Andrea Echeverri chronology
Andrea Echeverri (2005)	Dos (2011)

Singles from Andrea Echeverri
- 1. "A Eme O" Released: May 16, 2005; 2. "Amortiguador" Released: December 19, 2005

Andrea Echeverri is the self-titled debut studio album by Colombian musician Andrea Echeverri released on February 8, 2005, by Nacional Records. It received a nomination for a Grammy Award for Best Latin Pop Album.

Professional ratings
Review scores
Source	Rating
Allmusic	3.5/5 stars

== Track listing ==
All tracks are written by Andrea Echeverri.

No.	Title	Length
1.	"Amortiguador"	3:47
2.	"Baby Blues"	3:22
3.	"A Eme O"	3:27
4.	"Quédate"	3:13
5.	"Menos Mal"	3:46
6.	"Ya Yo No"	4:00
7.	"Frases"	4:27
8.	"Fulgor"	3:45
9.	"Imán"	2:45
10.	"Amniótico"	3:55
11.	"Lactochampeta"	2:23
12.	"Que No Haría"	4:17
13.	"A Eme O" (Sidestepper Remix)	4:17

== Personnel ==
Credits for Andrea Echeverri were adapted from Allmusic.

=== Musicians ===
- Andrea Echeverri – Guitar, Accordion, Marimba, Vocals, Graphic Design, Photography, Frog, Bagpipes, Strings, Clapping
- Héctor Buitrago – Guitar, Keyboards, Programming, Producer, Sixth Bass, Clapping
- Andrés Alvarez – Keyboards
- Roberto Cuao – Percussion
- Alejandro Gomez – Strings
- Rodrígo Mancera – Guitar
- Gabriel Rondon – Guitar
- Nadine Vasquez - Guitar

=== Production ===
- Richard Blair – Producer
- Rodrigo Facundo – Graphic Design, Photography
- Andrés Landínez – Assistant Engineer
- Felipe López – Engineer
- Jose Manuel – Producer
- Thom Russo – Programming, Production Assistant, Mixturer
- Eddy Schreyer – Mastering
