= Las Áñez =

Alternative band from Colombia

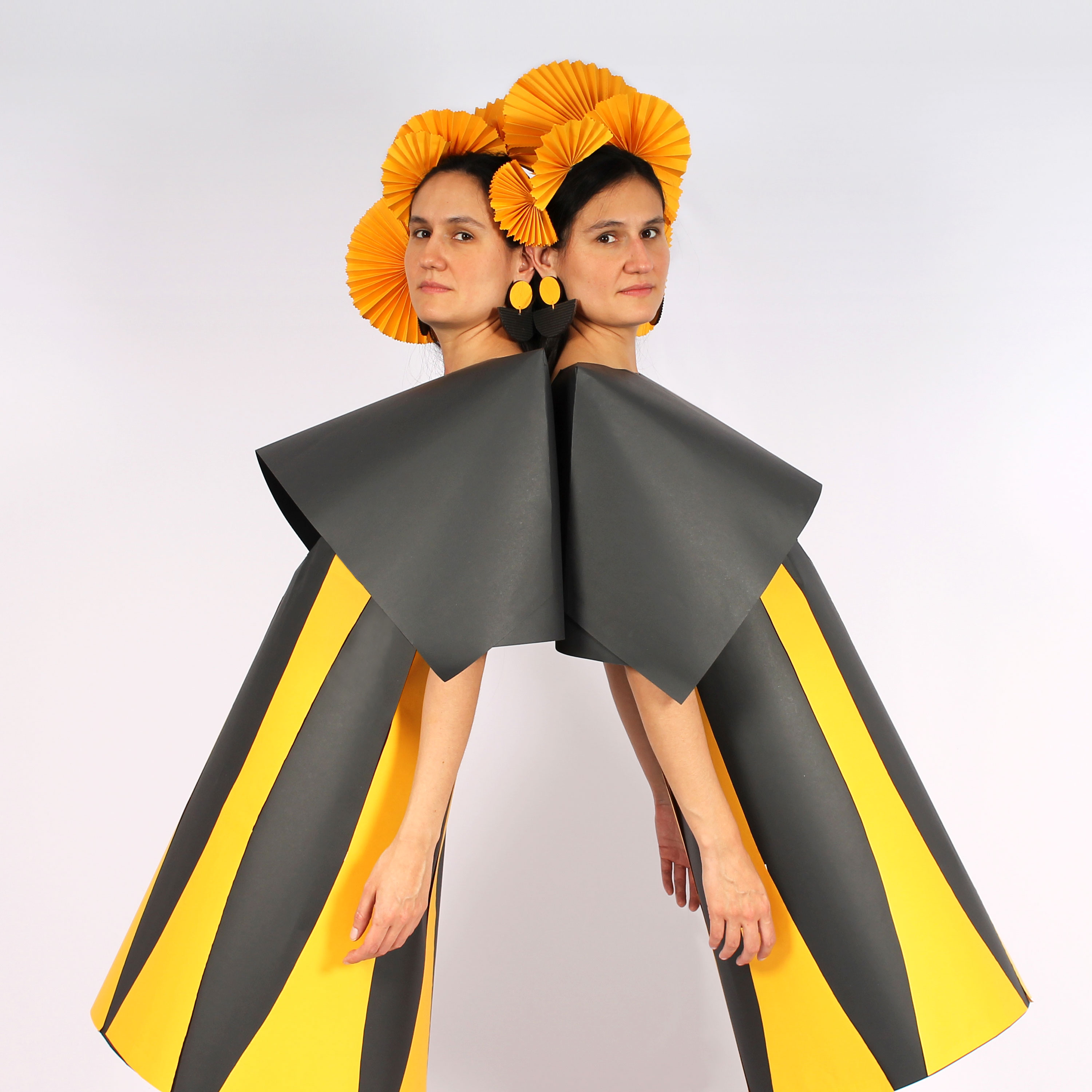
- Las Áñez, by Andrés Garzón Forero

Background information
- Origin: Bogotá, Cundinamarca, Colombia
- Genres: Rock en español; alterlatino; world music
- Years active: 2013–present
- Members: Juanita and Valentina Áñez Rothmann
- Website: Las Áñez

Las Áñez is a Colombian musical duo formed by the twins Juanita and Valentina Áñez Rothmann in 2013.

== Career ==
Las Áñez was formed in 2013 in Bogotá while they were still at university studying music. The twins, from a very young age, sang in harmony the music they heard at home. Their parents enrolled them in music classes after noticing their interest, even though they were not musicians themselves. They cite Mercedes Sosa as an influence and later Jonny Greenwood.

They studied music, specializing in jazz at Javeriana University. Their first song, "Semillas," was created using a loop pedal. This song appears on the album "Silbidos." They are also part of the group Bituin, where they collaborate with other musicians. Their first album is their university graduation project.

=== Musical style ===
Their musical style includes Latin American folk, electronic, and minimalist sounds, although the influence of their jazz studies leads them to explore a diversity of genres. They seek to create atmospheres with their voices. Their songs reflect on femininity, which has earned them distinctions such as being named the most important song of 2022 on radio stations like Radiónica. Their show has been described as sublime and hypnotic and their voices as crystalline and harmonious. Their rhythms range from son jarocho to joropo, including jota carupanera on albums such as Reflexión (2020).

=== Live performances and collaborations ===
Geometric figures and minimalist animations can be seen in their live performances. They wear costumes by Karin Rothmann. They have played on various stages in Europe and America, where their first concert outside of Colombia, where they are originally from, was in Uruguay.

Lido Pimienta and Cholo Valderrama have collaborated on their albums. They have also performed with Andrea Echeverri, Edson Velandia, Marta Gómez, and Aterciopelados. They have performed for RTVC Sessions, the Colombian Public Media System. Their first collaboration was with Marta Gómez, whom they contacted after seeing her perform at a concert in the Luis Ángel Arango Library. The collaboration with Lido Pimienta occurred after an Andrea Echeverri concert, where the twins sang backing vocals for her at the Equal Festival, a festival in which Pimienta also participated and invited them to play the song "Nada". They sang backing vocals on Aterciopelados' DVD Reluciente, Rechinante y Aterciopelado in 2015.

Their music is part of productions such as the series "One Hundred Years of Solitude" (2024) and films such as "Nosotras" (2023) by Emilce Quevedo.

=== Awards ===
Among the main awards and distinctions they have received and particularly remember are:

- Most important song of 2022 on Radiónica for "De curvo cuerpo".
- Best album, Colombian Ministry of Culture in 2017 and New Jewels Emerald Award in 2020.
- Best music for the film "Niña Errante" at the Tallinn Black Nights Film Festival in 2018.
- Ibermúsicas - Iberoamérica Composition Awards in 2018 and 2019.
- IDARTES Composition Awards in Bogotá, 2013 for "Mi Muñeca" and 2022 for "Canción de Amor".
- Best quarantine song from IDARTES in 2020, for the video "Señal del Viento".
- Otto de Greiff National Competition in 2015, for the album "Silbidos".
- Nominated for best folk song at the Nuestra Tierra Awards.

Sample of their song "De Curvo Cuerpo"

== Discography ==
=== Albums ===
- Silbidos (2017).
- Al aire (2017).
- Reflexión (2020).
- Paralelas (2023).
- La liberación (Original sountrack from the Amazon Prime's series) (2025).
- Dualismo mágico (2026)

=== Singles ===
- Pocahontas (Barrio Lindo Remix) (2014). Pocahontas is one of the songs they most enjoy performing.
- Villancico (2019).
- En la lucha (2020). This song is a respectful ode that refers to the greeting and its commonly heard response among the people of Bogotá: - How are you? - Fine, in the struggle (En la lucha, in Spanish).
- Presente simple (2020).
- Al tiempo (2020) ft. Kevin Johansen.
- Pueblito grande (2020). Regarding the changing climate of Bogota.
- A la música (2020).
- Reflejo mío (2020). Inspired by the symmetrical geometry found in the churches of Toledo with Mudejar style.
- Plañidera (2021) ft. Andrea Echeverri & Aterciopelados. This song talks about the Colombian conflict and how it affects women.
- De curvo cuerpo (2022). Song released on March 8th, which talks about beauty standards.
- Señal de viento (2022).
- Como si fuera yo (2022) ft. Lido Pimienta.
- Las tres hermanas (2022) ft. De Juepuchas.
- Las aguas de Macondo (2023).
- Cien años (2024).
- Libéralo (2025) ft. La Muchacha.
