= Claroscura =

Studio album by Aterciopelados
- Released: May 30, 2018
- Recorded: 2017–2018
- Studios: Audiovisión Bogotá, Mondo Mix Bs Aires and Groove Estudios, Bogotá
- Length: 49:06
- Label: Sony Music
- Producers: Héctor Buitrago; Cachorro Lopez

Aterciopelados chronology
Reluciente, Rechinante y Aterciopelado (2016)	Claroscura (2018)

Singles from Claroscura
- 1. "Play" Released: April 12, 2018; 2. "Dúo" Released: November 8, 2018

Claroscura is the eighth studio album by Colombian band Aterciopelados, released in 2018. It marks the band's return after nine years since their previous studio album. Production duties were shared by Héctor Buitrago and Argentine producer Cachorro Lopez in Groove Studios in Bogotá, while the mastering was done by the engineer Emily Lazar in The Lodge Studio L.A.

The first single from the album was the Ana Tijoux collaboration, "Play", released on April 12, 2018. Several lyrics of the album are focused on female empowerment as well as topics that have been frequented by the group in previous albums such as the environment and spirituality. They received a Latin Grammy Award for Best Alternative Music Album, making it their third Latin Grammy and were also nominated in the category of Best Alternative Song for the song "Dúo".

== Track listing ==
All tracks are written by Aterciopelados, except where noted.

No.	Title	Lyrics	Length
1.	"Play" (featuring Ana Tijoux)		3:43
2.	"Cuerpo"		3:05
3.	"Tu Amor Es"		3:56
4.	"Ay Ombe (Vamo' a Relajar el Pony)" (featuring Jorge Celedón)		3:46
5.	"Tumbao"		3:30
6.	"Soñemos un Bosque"		3:54
7.	"Dúo"		3:33
8.	"Despierta Mujer"		3:26
9.	"Manifiesto Colibrí"		3:22
10.	"Piernas"		4:13
11.	"Vieja"		4:53
12.	"Show"		3:28
13.	"He Venido a Pedirte Perdón" (Remastered)	Juan Gabriel	3:44
Total length:			48:52

== Personnel ==
=== Aterciopelados ===
- Andrea Echeverri – vocals, rhythm guitar
- Héctor Buitrago – bass, backing vocals

=== Additional musicians ===
- Ana Tijoux – backing vocals
- Jorge Celedón – backing vocals
