= El Dorado (Aterciopelados album) =

Studio album by Aterciopelados
- Released: October 24, 1995
- Recorded: October–December 1994
- Studio: Audiovisión, Bogotá
- Genre: Rock; Latin rock
- Length: 47:55
- Label: Sony BMG
- Producer: Federico López

Aterciopelados chronology
| Con el Corazón en la Mano (1993) | El Dorado (1995) | La Pipa de la Paz (1996) |

Singles from El Dorado
- 1. "Bolero Falaz" Released: 1995; 2. "Florecita Rockera" Released: 1995; 3. "Candela" Released: 1995; 4. "La Estaca" Released: 1996

El Dorado is the second studio album released by Colombian rock group Aterciopelados, released on October 24, 1995 through Sony BMG. The album was produced by Federico López and recorded at Audiovisión in Bogotá, Colombia.

The album has been considered by many music critics as one of the most important albums of rock in Spanish as well as the album that brought international recognition and commercial success to the group. American magazine Al Borde placed the album at number 9 in their list of 250 Most Important Albums of Iberoamerican Rock, released in 2006, being one of the three albums by the group to appear on the list. The album also contains "Bolero Falaz", one of the most acclaimed songs from the group, the song was placed at number on by Rolling Stone Colombia on their of 50 Greatest Colombian Songs, released in 2014.

It was a commercial success for the group, selling 150,000 copies in its first year of release. Nowadays, the album has sold over 400,000 copies in Colombia and 600,000 copies worldwide, with several editions released for United States, Spain, Mexico and Argentina.

== Background ==
Following the good reception for their previous album, Con el Corazón en la Mano (1993), the group received a bigger support from their label BMG, which allowed them to experiment with their sound and find the sound for the album. El Dorado, released in 1995, was produced by Federico López and was recorded from October to December 1994 at Audiovisión Studios in Bogotá, Colombia. The recording of the album saw the inclusion of Cuban drummer Alejandro Duque into the group, Duque composed drums for a cassette he picked from a radio station where Buitrago used to work, Duque initially worked in the song "Si No Se Pudo, Pues No Se Pudo", the result made the group ask Duque to work in other songs for the album such as "Candela", "El Dorado" and "Bolero Falaz", among others, Duque would later be included into the group until 1997.

The name for the album comes from the legend of the same name about a supposed gold kingdom that was unsuccessfully searched by Spanish conquistadors in Colombia. The album deals with themes related to spirituality as well as the ancestral roots in Colombia and the culture of the country, different genres of music were explored during the recording of the album such as cumbia, bolero, rock ballads and punk, Colombian sounds and references are present throughout the album in songs like the latin rock "Candela", the melodramatic "Bolero Falaz", the joropo "Siervo sin Tiera", which borrows its name from the novel of the same name by Colombia author Eduardo Caballero Calderón, the song "Pilas" about the social cleansing in Colombia, the ranchera rock "La Estaca" and the rock "Florecita Rocketa" which would become a staple in Colombian rock and deals with themes of female spirit and strength.

Initially, the cover art for the album, designed by the group themselves, contained the image of Our Lady of Sorrows with its heart crossed by a dagger and with the face of Echeverría edited on top of its face, the cover was changed by the label due to the potentially negative reactions, instead, the cover was replaced with the image of the members of the group covered in gold-colored powder referencing Colombian indigenous people and the legend of El Dorado. Aside from the censorship of the initial cover, the song "Bolero Falaz" also faced censorship from some media due to it "containing obsene language".

Nevertheless, the album was a commercial success selling 150,00 copies in its first year of release, a number that was deemed followers of the genre in Colombia as a "surprise". The music video of "Bolero Falaz", produced by Rhayuela Films, received considerate rotation and attention from MTV Latin America, which gave the group international exposure. The international success of the album allowed the group to tour in several countries, starting in Colombia being the opening act of Mexican band Caifanes and then giving concerts in Mexico and Argentina, with Argentine band Soda Stereo in the latter country. The album also led the group to be included in the lineup for the first edition of the festival Rock al Parque in Colombia, alongside acts like Fobia, 1280 Almas and La Derecha, among others.

== Critical reception ==
Professional ratings
Review scores
| Source | Rating |
|---|---|
| Allmusic | 4/5 stars |

The album has been considered as highly influential within Latin American music as well as Colombian rock, Nicolás Vallejo Cano from Vice wrote that "El Dorado is a visionary songbook that celebrates our many bloodlines and that, as a metaphor, breaks down the many borders that separate us as Colombians, It is a forceful stake that cuts across time and space, class and gender, tribe and race. It is a great national dance".

Music historian Umberto Pérez commented about El Dorado that "although on their debut album, 'Con el corazón en la mano', Andrea Echeverri, Héctor Buitrago and their companions already suggest something, I think that two years later, on 'El Dorado', they end up finding the crux of it that they were looking for, which is a great communion of elements of popular, Colombian and Latin American music with aesthetic and visual elements of popular culture", he also likened the album to Mexican band Café Tacvba's Re and Argentine singer Charly García's Clics modernos writing that "those three albums are watershed moments in the history of popular music in each of those countries, even on a continental level, they are breakthrough records in musical, sound, aesthetic, lyrical or narrative spectrums, I think that El Dorado by Aterciopelados has that, it has something new, genuine".

=== All-time lists ===
| Publication | Country | List | Year | Rank | Ref. |
|---|---|---|---|---|---|
| Al Borde | United States | 250 Most Important Albums of Iberoamerican Rock | 2006 | 9 | |
| Radiónica | Colombia | Colombian rock: 100 albums, 50 years | 2013 | 13 | |

== Track listing ==
| No. | Title | Writer(s) | Length |
|---|---|---|---|
| 1. | "Florecita Rockera" | Héctor Buitrago | 3:01 |
| 2. | "Sueños del 95" | Andrea Echeverri | 3:12 |
| 3. | "Candela" | Buitrago; Echeverri | 2:42 |
| 4. | "Bolero Falaz" | Buitrago; Echeverri | 3:48 |
| 5. | "No Futuro" | Buitrago; Echeverri | 3:04 |
| 6. | "El Dorado" | Buitrago | 3:07 |
| 7. | "De Tripas Corazón" | Buitrago; Echeverri | 4:54 |
| 8. | "Colombia Conexión" | Buitrago | 2:05 |
| 9. | "Las Cosas de la Vida" | Buitrago | 2:41 |
| 10. | "Pilas!" | Buitrago | 1:37 |
| 11. | "La Estaca" | Echeverri | 2:22 |
| 12. | "El Diablo" | Buitrago | 4:31 |
| 13. | "Si No Se Pudo, Pues No Se Pudo" | Buitrago | 4:05 |
| 14. | "Siervo sin Tierra" | Buitrago | 3:11 |
| 15. | "Errantes" | Buitrago | 2:57 |
| 16. | "Mujer Gala" (Bonus track) | Buitrago; Echeverri | 1:29 |

== Credits ==
=== Aterciopelados ===
- Andrea Echeverri – vocals, guitar
- Héctor Buitrago – bass, backing vocals
- Andrés Giraldo – drums
- Charlie Márquez – guitar

=== Guest musicians ===
- Alejandro Duque – drums
- Alejandro Gomezcaceres – harmonica
- Gilbert Martínez – drums
- Willy Newball – keyboards
- Juan José Virviescas – maracas, backing vocals
