= La Muchacha =

Colombian musician, singer, and songwriter

- Born: Laura Isabel Ramírez Ocampo; Manizales, Colombia
- Label: In-Correcto
- Member of: El Propio Junte

Laura Isabel Ramírez Ocampo, (Note: In this Spanish name, the first or paternal surname is Ramírez and the second or maternal family name is Ocampo.) known by the stage name La Muchacha, is a Colombian musician, singer, and songwriter. She has released four albums, and with her band El Propio Junte has toured in Latin America, Europe, and the United States.

== Life and career ==
La Muchacha was born Laura Isabel Ramírez Ocampo in Manizales, in the Colombian department of Caldas. She studied art at the University of Caldas.

Ramírez started her music career singing in a reggae band. She then started performing as a solo artist under the name Muchacha Pájaro, taken from the line "muchacha pájaro, mi cielo azul" from a song by Argentine singer Sabú. She later shortened the name to just "La Muchacha", which is Spanish for "the girl" and can have pejorative connotations in Colombia.

In 2018, La Muchacha released her debut album Polen. That year she toured in Colombia. In 2020 she released her second album Canciones Crudas on Bogotá record label In-Correcto, which music magazine Shock named one of the best Colombian albums of the year. Her third album Más Canciones Crudas was released in March 2021.

La Muchacha's single "No Azara", which released in May 2021, became an anthem of the 2021 Colombian protests. The song takes inspiration from peace activists in the Colombian town of San José de Apartadó. In 2024, La Muchacha released the album Los Ombligos with bassist Miguel Velásquez Matjasevic and percussionist Camilo Bartelsman under the name El Propio Junte. With El Propio Junte she has toured in Latin America, Europe, and the United States.

== Albums ==
- Polen (2018)
- Canciones Crudas (2020, In-Correcto)
- Más Canciones Crudas (2021, In-Correcto)
- Los Ombligos (2024, In-Correcto), with El Propio Junte

== Singles ==
- "Libéralo" (2025) ft. Las Áñez
