= Quiero Club =

Mexican pop-rock band

- Origin: Monterrey, Mexico
- Genres: Experimental pop; rock; electronic; indie pop
- Years active: 2004–present
- Labels: Happy-fi; Nacional; Casete; Buendia Records
- Members: Priscila González; Marcela Viejo; Luis Fara; Boscop Benavente; Gustavo "Cátsup" Hernández

Quiero Club is an experimental pop indie band from Monterrey, Mexico.

Since they took the music scene by surprise in 2004, Priscila González, Gustavo "Cátsup" Hernández, Marcela Viejo, Luis Fara and Boscop Benavente made the core members of what the band achieved musically and historically by playing at the most important venues and festivals in Mexico, Peru, Colombia, Argentina and Spain.

"Minutos de Aire" a song they wrote along with the legendary singer Jorge González (from Chile's Los Prisioneros) was awarded # 1 song of the year on Mexico City's Reactor 105.7 in 2009. Their LP "El Techo es el Suelo" gave them the Mexico's IndieO Music AwardS 2014 Feather for "Best Electronic Album" and a 2013 Latin Grammy nomination for "Best art/package".

Quiero Club has scored music for Mexican films like Rudo y Cursi, Efectos Secundarios, Casi Divas, Abolicion de la Propiedad, Maria en el Pais de Maria, and The Alien and Me, as well as international series and films such as The L Word and Que Viva la Musica.

After releasing the singles "Oportunidad de Oro" and "Millones" Quiero Club were one of the most representative and innovative bands within the Latin American independent music movement.

== History ==
Priscila Gonzalez, Luis Fara & Boscop Benavente came from different backgrounds before they joined forces with Marcela Viejo and Gustavo "Cátsup" Hernández, founder of the Monterrey-based music/art collective later turned record label "Happy-fi". At the end of 2002, Priscila started the band with Gustavo to play cover versions of The Moldy Peaches and other groups they liked after they performed live jams on Gustavo's radio show "We are the Rock & Roll". Boscop joined them soon after ( early 2003) and by the end of that year, during a Happy Fest (one of the parties that the collective used to expose their artists) Marcela watched the trio and asked to join them. A couple of months later (early 2004), Luis Fara came along and they started writing and rehearsing their own material.

They recorded "No Coke" and "Pecan Pie" at Luigi Marchetti's (bassist of Monterrey's rock band Niña, also part of the Happy Fi family) home studio in Santa Catarina, Nuevo León, during the summer of 2004 for a Happy Fi compilation, the first track leaked unto Mexico City's recently created public radio station Reactor and quickly became one of the most requested tunes and, consequently, one of the station's early hits. When they found out, Quiero Club went into a professional studio with Armando and Lapas to re arrange the song, new drums, bass, guitar, keyboards tracks were recorded as well as additional programming.

They were invited to Mexico City's Vive Latino festival in 2005 with just a bunch of songs and it was until then that they considered to take their band seriously. They toured the country during the rest of the year and continued to write songs while touring. With self financing and while continuing to tour Mexico, they entered Belafonte Studio in San Pedro Garza García. It was not until the winter of 2006 that Quiero Club's self produced debut album WOF came out to rave reviews. At this time they signed with management & booking agency HOME (Haas, Onetto, Montemayor Entertainment).

NPR says: "It was the beginning of 2006 and a catchy song in Spanglish titled "No Coke" hit the emerging Mexican indie scene by storm; five years later, Quiero Club is arguably today's most eclectic and critically acclaimed Mexican pop band."

WOF had four singles with their respective videos: No Coke, Backstage Drama, Let Da Music, & Latin America. In March 2008 "WOF" was released in Japan via Art Union Co. with a remix of "let da music" by Japan's 80kids as a Bonus track. Some of WOF's tracks became part of different compilations, others became part of various movie soundtracks, others were remixed by dance floor connoisseurs.

After 2 years of performing all sorts of scenarios, from homemade backyard gigs to huge international festivals like Vive Latino Mexico (05, 07), Corona Festival (07), MX Beat (07) and Rock al Parque Colombia (07); Quiero Club began working on new songs in the studio.

They continued to tour while recording and writing new material, in the middle of the recording they released the song "Showtime" along with its video in April 2008; "Showtime" was co produced by Phil Vinall and it was the first single from their 12 track second album called "Nueva America". After playing the Motorkr festival along with MGMT, The Flaming Lips and Nine Inch Nails (among others), Nueva America was released in November 2008; a bit more psychedelic, a bit more pop, a bit more dance, a bit more experimental. Jason Roberts worked with them on the second single "The Flow"; and for their third single they picked "Minutos de Aire" a song they co wrote with Jorge Gonzalez of the legendary Chilean band Los Prisioneros. "Minutos de Aire" became Reactor 105.7's number one song in 2009, which proved to be a good year for the band, after they opened for one of Depeche Mode's two dates in Mexico City's Foro Sol.

Also in 2009, they edited Nueva America on Nacional Records.

A string of successful singles (Música, Las Propiedades del Cobre and Que Hacer En Caso De Oir Voces, later compiled on the EP "Dias Perfectos") kept the band's momentum during 2010 and 2011. At the end of 2010 they decided to relocate to Mexico City to write and produce their 3rd album. The aftermath of this was the celebrated "El Techo es el Suelo" (which roughly translates into "The Ceiling is the Floor") and the departure of Gustavo "Cátsup" Hernández of the band, following different interests and career direction.

El Techo es el Suelo was released on 19 February, topping the iTunes charts in Mexico. Critically acclaimed both for the music and the artwork, designed by The Welcome Branding Group. 2013 Latin Grammy Nominee for Art/Package and IMAS 2014 winner for both Electronic Album and Art/Package.

In 2014, the band released the limited edition compilation vinyl LP "Diez" to celebrate their 10-year career run, which featured 10 of their most successful songs and the unpublished song "Hielo Fino" and launched their first South American tour with dates in Lima, Peru; Bogota, Colombia and Buenos Aires and La Plata, Argentina.

By mid 2015 the band started working with producers Neto Garcia (Natalia Lafourcade, Julieta Venegas) and Antonio Escobar to release songs for a Mexican Movie (The Alien and I) and a compilation to introduce the band to the Spanish audience (2016's "Somos"). The relationship with both producers proved fruitful as they decided to continue working with them to produce a 4th album.

Starting 2016, Quiero Club began production of "Oportunidad de Oro" with the addition of Monterrey-based producers Toy Selectah (Control Machete) and Heriberto Lopez. Later that summer they released the track "Teorías" and traveled to Spain to perform at "Sonorama Ribera" Festival in Aranda.

A strain of (unknown to the public) events that delayed the release of the album ended with long time collaborator Marcela Viejo leaving the band to pursue a solo career in April 2017. But the band came back with the singles "Oportunidad de Oro" and "Millones", which proved the band's ability to deliver powerful pop anthems. In June 2018, the much awaited album "Oportunidad de Oro" was released achieving mixed results: for one, the critics praised the band for their continued efforts to experiment and further their work but the record failed to appeal to the younger generation and their long time fan base.

They failed to launch a national tour and ended the year with a 5 date tour throughout Spain which included small venues in Madrid and Sevilla's music festival Monkey Week.

In March 2019 Luis Fara left the band.

In 2022, the band expressed their appreciation for Carlos Reyes, the founder of Club Fonograma, after his death.

== Original members ==
- Priscila Gonzalez – vocals, guitar, keyboards
- Luis Fara – bass guitar, guitar, keyboards, vocals
- Boscop Benavente – drums, bass guitar, keyboards
- Marcela Viejo – keyboards, vocals
- Gustavo "Cátsup" Hernández – guitar, keyboards, vocals

== Discography ==
=== Albums ===
- WOF (2006)
- Nueva América (2008)
- Dias Perfectos (EP, 2011)
- El Techo es el Suelo (2013)
- Diez (2014)
- Somos (2016)
- Oportunidad de Oro (2018)

=== Singles ===
- "No Coke" (2005)
- "Backstage Drama" (2006)
- "Let Da Music" (2007)
- "Latin America" (2007)
- "Showtime" (2008)
- "Da Flow" (2008)
- "Minutos de Aire" (2009)
- "Las Propiedades del Cobre" (2010)
- "Que Hacer en Caso de Oir Voces" (2011)
- "Dias Perfectos" (2011)
- "Cuentos" (2012)
- "El Techo es el Suelo" (2013)
- "Hablar de Más"/"Música" (2013)
- "Cuerpo" (2014)
- "Los Pies" (2014)
- "Hielo Fino" (2014)
- "Gran Antigüedad" (2015)
- "Los Cuatro Puntos" (2015)
- "Teorías" (2016)
- "Siénteme" (2016)
- "Oportunidad de Oro" (2017)
- "Millones" (2017)
- "Esperar" (2017)
- "No hay Semilla" (2018)
- "ASI" (2019)
- "hola" (2022)
