= Génesis (band) =

Colombian folk-rock band

Géne-sis
- Also known as: Génesis de Colombia; Maíz
- Origin: Bogotá, Colombia
- Genres: folk rock psychedelic rock
- Years active: 1972–1992
- Labels: Atomo; Codiscos
- Past members: Humberto Monroy; Tania Moreno; Claudia Kala Guerrero; Ceballos; Camilo Ferrans; Guillermo Guzman; Juan Fernando Echavarría; Betty Vargas; Jimmy Aguilar; Edgar Restrepo Caro; Federico Taborda; Alfonso Chacon; Jorge Latorre; Batier Chavez

Génesis was a Colombian folk rock band, very popular during the 1970s. They are regarded as a significant part of the Colombian social progressive and hippy movements of the time. Génesis is considered a pioneer in fusing rock music with the native folk music of Colombia. Colombian icon Humberto Monroy of Los Speakers was a founding member and driving force behind the band.

== Discography ==
- Gene-Sis A-Dios, Átomo, 1972
- Génesis, Codiscos, 1974
- Yakta Mama, Codiscos, 1975
- Reuniom, Orbe, 1978
- El paso de Los Andes, CBS, 1981
- En un planeta lejano, CBS, 1982
- A quien/Fuiste un tonto (single, released under the band name "Maíz"), Independent, 1983
- Absolutamente normal, CBS/Discos Diamante, 1987
