= Con el Corazón en la Mano (Aterciopelados album) =

Studio album by Aterciopelados
- Released: 1993
- Recorded: 1992
- Genre: Rock, Latin rock
- Length: 44:31
- Label: Sony Music, RCA International
- Producer: Juan Antonio Castillo

Aterciopelados chronology
Con el Corazón en la Mano (1993)	El Dorado (1995)

Singles from Con el Corazón en la Mano
- 1. "Mujer Gala" Released: 1993; 2. "Sortilegio" Released: 1993

Con el Corazón en la Mano is the debut studio album by Colombian band Aterciopelados. It was released in 1993 and its influences range from punk rock music to Colombian folk music. The band wanted to mix styles to have a unique identity and create a unique type of music taking into consideration their local and global influences. From this album, "Mujer Gala", "Sortilegio" and "La Cuchilla" (a popular Colombian song reflecting local culture) are the most known.

For the debut, the members were Andrés Giraldo, Charly Márquez, Andrea Echeverri and Héctor Buitrago.

== Track listing ==
No.	Title	Writer(s)	Length
1.	"La gomela"	Héctor Buitrago	1:40
2.	"Ella"	Buitrago	2:56
3.	"Símbolo marciano"	Buitrago	2:34
4.	"Se parapeta"	Buitrago	2:57
5.	"Para mi solito"	Buitrago	3:25
6.	"Mal castigo"	Buitrago, Andrea Echeverri	3:41
7.	"Mujer gala"	Buitrago, Echeverri	1:34
8.	"El pez (¡Qué pesar!)"	Buitrago	3:14
9.	"La cuchilla"	Jaime Rincón	2:01
10.	"La sirena"	Buitrago, Echeverri	3:25
11.	"Sortilegio"	Buitrago, Ch.Marquez	4:28
12.	"Las delicias"	Buitrago, Ch.Marquez, Echeverri	2:22
13.	"Quieto veneno"	Buitrago	1:15
14.	"No te me disuelvas"	Buitrago, Echeverri	4:52
15.	"La fe perdida"	Buitrago, Ch.Marquez	4:07
