= Cimafunk =

Cuban musician

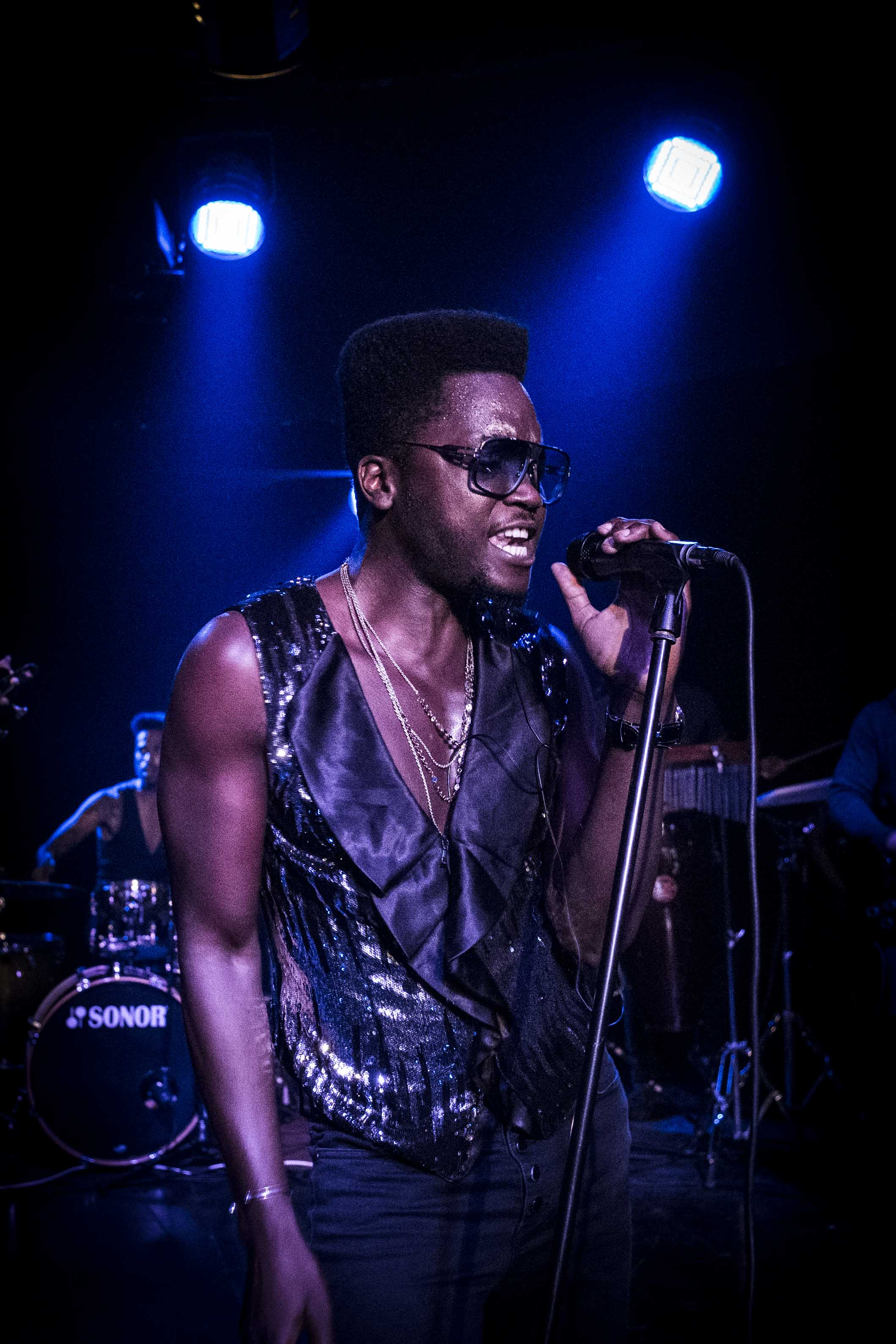
- Cimafunk performing in Cuba, 2018.

Background information
- Born: Erik Alejandro Iglesias Rodríguez; 1989 (age 36–37)
- Origin: Pinar del Rio, Cuba
- Genres: Funk, electronic, Latin, R&B
- Occupations: Singer, songwriter, producer
- Years active: 2010-present
- Label: Terapia Productions

Erik Alejandro Iglesias Rodríguez (born 1989), known professionally as Cimafunk, is a Cuban musician known for mixing funk and hip hop with Cuban and Afro-Caribbean music. His 2021 album, El Alimento, was nominated for a Grammy Award. His most recent album, Pa' Tu Cuerpa, was released in 2024.

== Biography ==
Rodriguez sang in church as a child, and originally planned to become a doctor like several members of his family. He attended medical school in his hometown of Pinar del Río for two years, but moved to Havana in 2010 to pursue music. He worked as a session arranger and producer for Cuban musicians like Raúl Paz and Liuba María Hevia, and was also in the band Interactivo from 2014 to 2016. After leaving that band, he adopted the name Cimafunk, referencing the cimarróns, escaped slaves who formed self-sustaining communities in Cuba during the colonial era. His backing band featured a rotating cast of collaborators. Cimafunk endeavored to blend Afro-Cuban and African American music, with a focus on funk rhythms. The New Yorker has since compared him to James Brown.

Cimafunk self-released the album Terapia in 2017, followed by the single "Me Voy" in 2018. Billboard named him one of the "10 Latin Artists to Watch in 2019". Cimafunk completed a successful tour of the United States and Europe in 2019, during which time he gained significant popularity in his native Cuba. While on lockdown in 2020 during the COVID-19 pandemic, he released several stand-alone singles and the EP Cun Cun Prá. In October 2021, he released the album El Alimento, featuring guest appearances by George Clinton, Lupe Fiasco, and CeeLo Green. Both Rolling Stone and NPR named El Alimento as one of the best albums of the year. The album was nominated for Best Latin Rock or Alternative Album at the 65th Annual Grammy Awards.

Cimafunk moved his base of operations to New Orleans, Louisiana in 2022, and his backing band was reorganized under the name La Tribu (Spanish for "The Tribe"). He released the album Pa' Tu Cuerpa in 2024.

== Discography ==
Studio albums

- Terapia (2017)
- Cun Cun Prá (EP, 2020)
- El Alimento (2021)
- Pa' Tu Cuerpa (2024)
