= Caribe Atómico =

Studio album by Aterciopelados
- Released: June 30, 1998
- Genre: Rock, Latin rock
- Length: 44:39
- Label: RCA International Sony BMG
- Producer: Andres Levin

Aterciopelados chronology
La Pipa de la Paz (1996)	Caribe Atómico (1998)	Serie 2000 (2000)

Singles from Caribe Atómico
- 1. "El estuche" Released: 1998; 2. "Maligno" Released: 1998; 3. "Caribe atómico" Released: 1998; 4. "Mañana" Released: 1999

Professional ratings
Review scores
Source	Rating
Allmusic	3/5 stars

Caribe Atómico is the fourth studio album by Colombian rock duo Aterciopelados. Released in 1998 it was nominated for a Grammy for Best Latin Rock/Alternative Performance in 1999.

== Track listing ==
No.	Title	Writer(s)	Length
1.	"Caribe atómico"	Buitrago	4:14
2.	"El estuche"	Echeverri	3:22
3.	"Maligno"	Buitrago, Echeverri	4:09
4.	"El desinflar de tu cariño"	Buitrago	3:53
5.	"Miénteme"	Echeverri,	2:48
6.	"Cosmos"	Buitrago	3:44
7.	"Péndulo"	Buitrago	4:00
8.	"Humo y alquitrán"	Buitrago	2:50
9.	"Mañana"	Andrea Echeverri	3:53
10.	"Doctora corazón"	Buitrago	4:32
11.	"Reacio"	Echeverri	3:43
12.	"Días"	Echeverri	3:24
