= Gozo Poderoso =

Studio album by Aterciopelados
- Released: August 6, 2000
- Genre: Alternative rock Latin rock Latin pop
- Length: 47:37
- Producer: Héctor Buitrago

Aterciopelados chronology
Serie 2000 (2000)	Gozo Poderoso (2000)	Evolución (2002)

Professional ratings
Review scores
Source	Rating
Allmusic	2.5/5 stars
Spin	8/10 stars

Gozo Poderoso is a 2000 album by Aterciopelados. It received Latin Grammy Nominations for Best Rock Vocal Album by a Duo or Group With Vocal and Record of the Year for the song "El Álbum", winning the former.

== Track listing ==
No.	Title	Length
1.	"Luz azul"	4:11
2.	"Uno lo mío y lo tuyo"	4:39
3.	"Rompecabezas"	4:13
4.	"Esmeralda"	4:04
5.	"Gozo poderoso"	4:10
6.	"El álbum"	3:58
7.	"Chamánica"	4:45
8.	"Transparente"	3:51
9.	"La misma tijera"	3:02
10.	"Fantasía"	3:55
11.	"Luto"	3:00
12.	"Interludio"	0:28
13.	"A su salud"	3:21

== Charts ==
Chart (2001)	Peak position
US Latin Pop Albums (Billboard)	7
US Top Latin Albums (Billboard)	11
