= Noel Petro =

Colombian musician, songwriter, and bullfighter

- Also known as: Burro Mocho, Torero Cantor
- Born: Noel Esteban Petro Henríquez; 19 March 1933 (age 92); Cereté, Colombia
- Years active: 1954–present

Noel Esteban Petro Henríquez (born 1933), known as Noel Petro or the Burro Mocho, is a Colombian musician, singer, songwriter, and bullfighter. He has recorded in a wide range of musical styles including porro, vallenato, bolero, rock and roll, and ranchera.

== Biography ==
=== Early life ===
Petro was born on 19 March 1933 in Cereté in the Department of Córdoba, Colombia. His mother was Catalina Henríquez. He attended primary school in Cereté and secondary school in Montería.

=== Career ===
Petro began his musical career singing on the radio and in the band Trío Latino alongside Julio Erazo and Cristóbal Pérez. His first solo recordings were "Me Voy Pa'l Salto", written by Alfonso Garavito Wheeler, and "Cabeza de Hacha", both recorded in 1954 backed by the band of Edmundo Arias. Many initially assumed that Petro had written "Cabeza de Hacha" because Arias (who taught Petro the song) had lost the authorship information; the song was later discovered to have been written in 1921 by the Argentine Cristino Tapia under the title "La Tupungatina", and recorded by Carlos Gardel.

In 1956 Petro designed and had made an electric requinto guitar, which Radio Nacional de Colombia described in 2023 as "a musical instrument that made him famous and which he still rehearses five hours a day." In his book Cultores de la Música Colombiana, José Pinilla Aguilar described the electric requinto as a "magical instrument...unique in [Colombia]."

Petro has toured in Colombia, Panama, Peru, Venezuela, and several countries in Central America. He has recorded 35 albums for record labels including Sonolux, Tropical, Disco Moda, and Daro. He has written more than 70 songs, with notable examples being "Azucena", "La Gran Señora", "El Conejo Pelao", "Margarita Divina", "Que le Bajen los Huevos", "Canto para Claudia", "La Reina de Las Cruces", "El Puente de Quebredablanca", and "Jorge Herrera". Petro has composed several songs for Blanca Caldas Méndez, better known as Claudia de Colombia. He claimed to have once gone to the top of the Tequendama Falls to commit suicide because of his unrequited feelings for her. In 2008 Caldas described Petro's behaviour towards her as harassment.

=== Bullfighting ===
Petro is a bullfighter, and has at times included bullfighting performances in his concerts, as well as musical performances at bullfights. This led to one of his nicknames, the Torero Cantor (Spanish for "singing bullfighter"). Petro received his bullfighting alternativa from Pepe Cáceres in Bogotá.

== The Burro Mocho ==
One of Petro's nicknames is the Burro Mocho. In interviews he talks about the Burro Mocho in the third person, and claims that he was born in Sapo Muerto, a fictional village. Jaime Monsalve writes that "it is difficult to know whether the person is named Noel Petro, nicknamed "Burro Mocho", or whether he is called Burro Mocho, also known as Noel Petro...Nine decades after his birth, fact and fiction have blended."

== Family ==
Colombian president Gustavo Petro wrote in his autobiography that his father was Noel Petro's cousin, and later the two were interviewed together by journalist Laura Ardila and confirmed their familial relation. However, in January 2024 Gustavo Petro claimed in a post on Twitter that he is not related to Noel.
