= Aterciopelados =

Rock band from Colombia

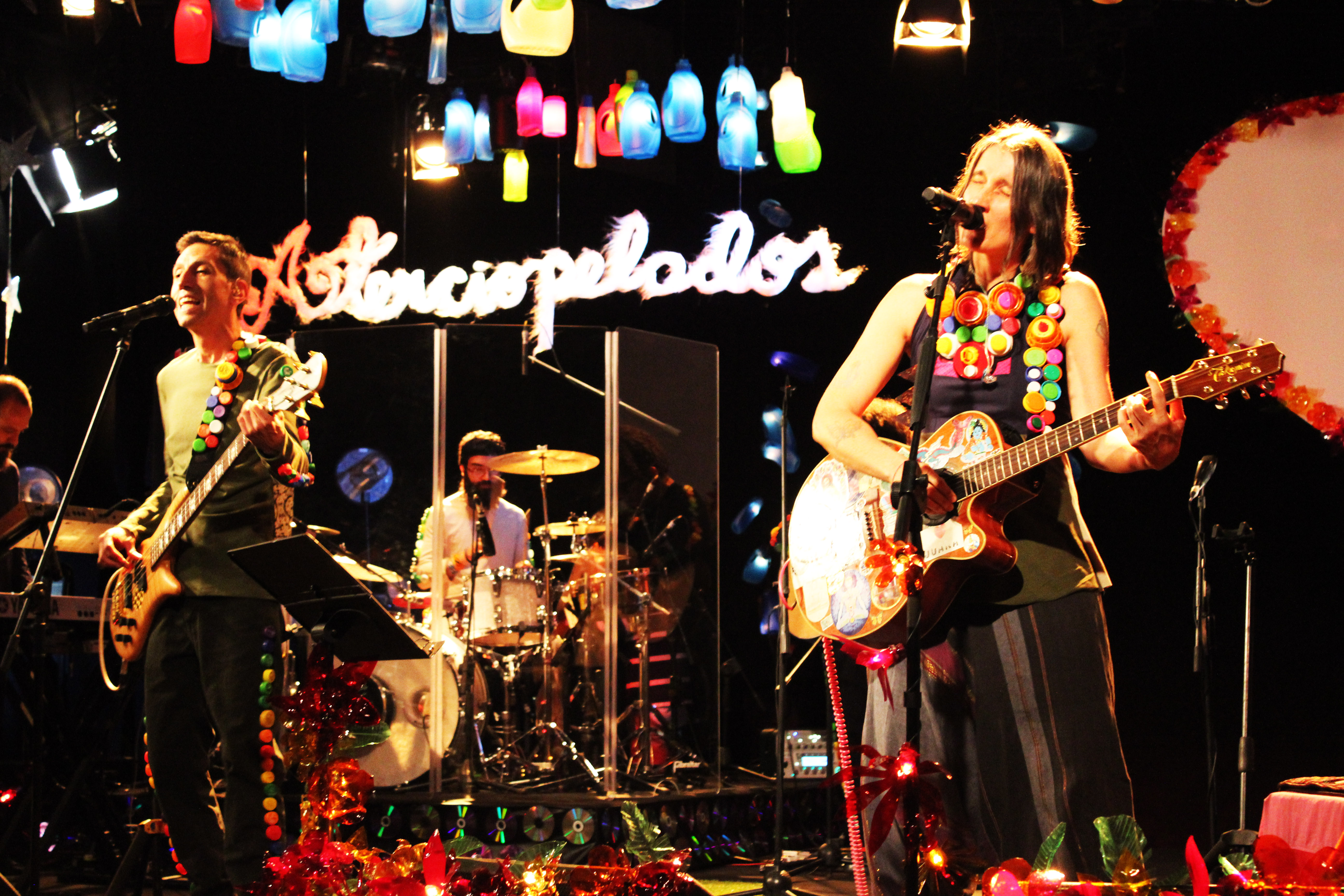

Background information
- Origin: Bogotá, Cundinamarca, Colombia
- Genres: Rock en español; alterlatino; world music
- Years active: 1992–present
- Labels: Sony Music; Nacional Records
- Members: Andrea Echeverri (vocals, acoustic guitar); Héctor Buitrago (bass); Mauricio Montenegro (drums)
- Website: Aterciopelados

Aterciopelados (English: Velvety Ones), also known as Los Aterciopelados, is a rock band from Colombia, led by Andrea Echeverri and Héctor Buitrago. Their music fuses rock with a variety of Colombian and Latin American musical traditions. Aterciopelados have recorded eight albums.

The group has won four Latin Grammy Awards from eight nominations, including Best Alternative Album in 2007 for Oye, as well as four Grammy Award nominations. Their song "Bolero Falaz" topped Canal Viva Colombia's list of the 1,000 most important songs of Colombian rock, and several more of their songs also made the list, including "Maligno", "El Estuche", "Mujer Gala" and "Sortilegio".

Aterciopelados are internationally recognized for their socially conscious message, and regularly discuss issues including political injustice, women's rights, and environmental destruction. They were honored by the United Nations for their work denouncing violence in Colombia.

== Background ==
Primarily a collaboration between vocalist/guitarist Andrea Echeverri and bassist/arranger Héctor Buitrago, who began collaborating in Bogotá, Colombia, in the early 1990s as "Delia y los Aminoácidos". Buitrago came from a hardcore punk background, leading a group called La Pestilencia, while Echeverri had been drawn into the nascent scene through art school friends. Buitrago had been a fan of boogaloo by Richie Ray in his childhood, and later bands including Led Zeppelin, Deep Purple, and Yes, and taught himself bass guitar by ear. Together they went on to open a rock club in Bogotá.

== Music and albums ==
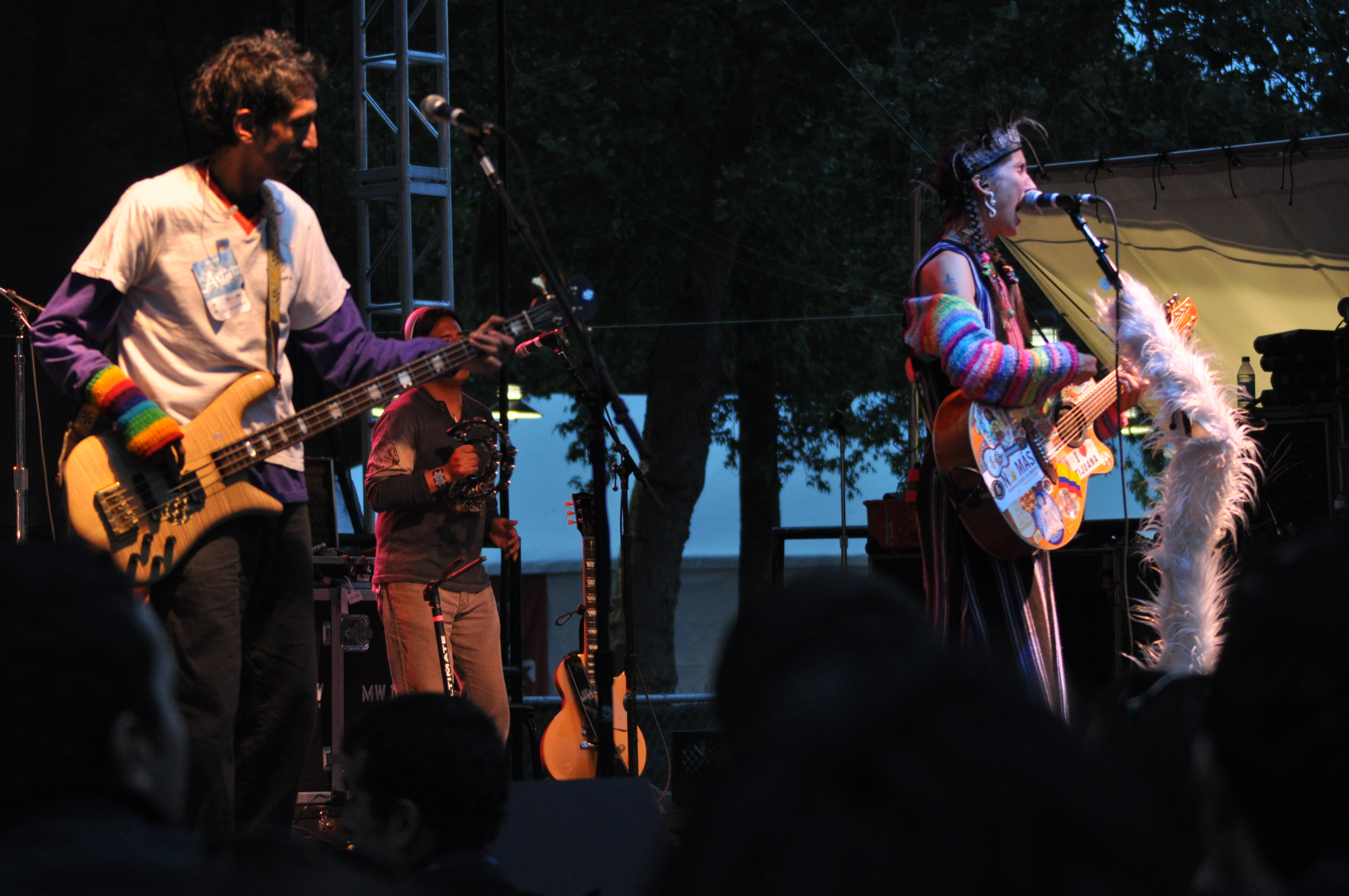
Aterciopelados play at Bumbershoot, Seattle Center, Seattle, Washington.

Aterciopelados have recorded eight albums. Their first album, Con El Corazón en la Mano ("With my Heart in my Hand"), features heavy distorted guitars and a loud punk drumbeat.

On their second album, El Dorado ("The Golden One"), Aterciopelados began including traditional llanera rhythms of the Colombian countryside. Their first major hit single, "Bolero Falaz" ("Phony Bolero"), featured a rock–bolero sound, and broke the band on MTV Latin America.

Their third album, La Pipa de la Paz ("The Pipe of Peace"), was recorded in London with Roxy Music guitarist Phil Manzanera producing. Signature songs from the album included "Cosita Seria" ("A Little Something Serious"), "Chica Difícil" ("Difficult Girl"), and "Baracunatana". After the release of the album, Aterciopelados toured the United States, recording an MTV Unplugged appearance in early 1997.

The following year the band released Caribe Atómico ("Atomic Caribbean"), recorded in Manhattan with guest appearances by guitarists Arto Lindsay and Marc Ribot, which broadened their sound with electronic influences.

Gozo Poderoso ("Powerful Joy"), their fifth album, was recorded in Bogotá and produced by Buitrago. Following the album's release, Aterciopelados won a Latin Grammy Award for Best Rock Group. The album was followed a couple of years by Evolución, a collection of greatest hits.

In 1996, Aterciopelados performed "Una Hoja, Una Raiz (One Leaf, One Root)" with Diego Frenkel and Laurie Anderson for the AIDS benefit album Silencio=Muerte: Red Hot + Latin produced by the Red Hot Organization.

In 2006, Aterciopelados released Oye ("Listen") on Nacional Records, a return to the rock sound of their earlier work on albums such as La Pipa de la Paz. Produced by Buitrago and mixed by Thom Russo, the album's first single, "Complemento", is an upbeat declaration of love from someone who has found a soulmate who complements her. The album also features social and political commentary on songs like "Don Dinero" ("Mr. Money"), about society's obsession with money, "Oye Mujer" ("Woman, Listen") which discusses the objectification of women, and "Canción Protesta" ("Protest Song"), a polemic against war and injustice. The video for "Canción Protesta" features the group using guitars made from decommissioned machine guns, presented to the band by the United Nations in recognition of its advocacy against gun violence in Colombia. During this period the band played shows in Mexico, Central and South America, Europe and the U.S.

On 21 October 2008, Aterciopelados released their 7th album Rio ("River") on Nacional Records, recorded in Bogotá and mixed by Héctor Castillo in New York City. The album's opener and title track is a reference to a proposed Colombian constitutional referendum to declare access to clean drinking water as a fundamental right for all Colombian citizens, and provide maintenance and preservation rights. The track "Bandera" ("Flag") discusses immigration issues, inspired by the difficulties the band had experienced entering certain countries while touring. Guests on the album include rapper Gloria "Goyo" Martínez of Colombian hip hop act Choc Quib Town on "28", Andean group Kapary Walka on "Madre" ("Mother") and "Aguita" ("Little Water"), and Echeverri's daughter on "Ataque de Risa" ("Laughing Fit"). The album was received positively by Rolling Stone, The Washington Post, Billboard, NPR's All Things Considered, and Vibe magazine. Aterciopelados launched an extensive tour of the United States in April 2009 in support of the album.

Their most recent album Claroscura, from 2018, won the Latin Grammy Award for Best Alternative Album, and was nominated in the Grammy awards 2019 as Best Latin alternative, Urban album.

== Solo albums ==
In 2005 and 2006, Echeverri and Buitrago made solo albums: Echeverri's self-titled Andrea Echeverri and Buitrago's ConEctor. Andrea Echeverri is centered around Echeverri's experiences of pregnancy and becoming a mother. ConEctor, which translates as "with Héctor" or "connector", explores themes of contemporary spirituality, and features several guest artists including Echeverri, Alex Ubago and Julieta Venegas.

== Political views and activism ==
The band has a strongly socially conscious message. They regularly discuss social issues publicly, and have been involved in a range of projects related to progressive causes. They have been honored by the United Nations for their work denouncing violence in Colombia. Andrea Echeverri said in 2008: "If we are invited to a worthy cause, we are there. Only by respecting Mother Earth and the rights of everyone can the world truly live in harmony".

=== Water rights activism ===
Aterciopelados' album Rio, released 21 October 2008, coincided with discussion of a proposed Colombian constitutional referendum to declare access to water as a fundamental right for Colombian citizens. "When I was growing up, the Bogotá River was considered a mythic and iconic place, and now it's a tiny stream", said Echeverri. Buitrago noted, "While on previous albums, we may have simply declared many of the world's problems, we now strive to work in a more active way. In this case, it is with the recovery of Bogotá's river, as it is one of the most polluted rivers in the world."

The album features a strongly environmentalist message. In the song "Aguita" ("Water"), Echeverri sings that "the water belongs to everyone / Not to the highest bidder." In August, the band raised awareness of the issue by traveling down the Bogotá River gathering signatures for the referendum. By 15 September, over two million signatures had been collected, advancing the referendum to the next phase of the process. Since 2010 the band have been organizing a global initiative called Cantoalagua, highlighting the importance of the planet's water on the planet.

=== Amnesty International ===
Aterciopelados collaborated with Amnesty International and Link TV for a human rights project featuring a new version of "Cancion Protesta", from their 2006 album, Oye, to commemorate the 60th anniversary of the Universal Declaration of Human Rights. The song was re-written to address issues of human rights, under the title "The Price of Silence". The United Nations granted unprecedented access to the United Nations General Assembly for the filming of the video. Other artists involved included Stephen Marley (Jamaica), Gilberto Gil (Brazil), Angélique Kidjo (Benin), Yerba Buena (PanLatin), Julieta Venegas (Mexico), Emmanuel Jal (Sudan), Hugh Masekela (South Africa) and Rachid Taha (France/Algeria).

=== Destierro y Reparación ===
In Colombia, Aterciopelados is involved with the Destierro y Reparacion (Displacement and Reparations) project, which addresses the issue of displacement of native peoples. Promoted by the Museum of Antioquia, the project aims to raise popular awareness of the dimensions and implications of forced displacement, as a phenomenon weakening social stability. Additionally, the project aims to identify possible methods and forms of reparation that would ensure the application of fundamental rights and protect the culture of the affected communities. The project features discussions, workshops, exhibits and concerts and includes the participation of more than 20 institutions. Aterciopelados contributed the song "Errante Diamante" (Wandering Diamond) in support of the project.

== Awards and nominations ==
=== Grammy Awards ===
Aterciopelados have received five Grammy Award nominations from the U.S. National Academy of Recording Arts and Sciences. In 2006, Andrea Echeverri received her first solo nomination.

Year	Nominee / work	Award	Result
1998	La Pipa de la Paz	Best Latin Rock, Urban or Alternative Album	Nominated
1999	Caribe Atómico	Best Latin Rock, Urban or Alternative Album	Nominated
2002	Gozo Poderoso	Best Latin Rock, Urban or Alternative Album	Nominated
2006	Andrea Echeverri	Best Latin Pop Album	Nominated
2010	Río	Best Latin Rock, Urban or Alternative Album	Nominated
2019	Claroscura	Best Latin Rock, Urban or Alternative Album	Nominated

=== Latin Grammy Awards ===
The band have received four Latin Grammy Awards from eight nominations from the Latin Academy of Recording Arts & Sciences.

Year	Nominee / work	Award	Result
2001	"El Album"	Record of the Year	Nominated
2001	Gozo Poderoso	Best Rock Vocal Album, Duo or Group	Won
2001	"El Album"	Best Rock Song	Nominated
2005	Andrea Echeverri	Best Female Pop Vocal Album	Nominated
2007	Oye	Best Alternative Music Album	Won
2007	"Complemento"	Best Rock Song	Nominated
2009	Pombo Musical (Varios Artistas)	Best Latin Children's Album	Won
2018	Claroscura	Best Alternative Music Album	Won

=== Other recognition ===
In 2001, Aterciopelados was recognized by the writers of Time magazine as one of the top 10 contemporary global bands (outside of the United States), which included U2 and the Rolling Stones. In 2006, the magazine wrote that "Aterciopelados's true skill lies in its ability to take north-of-the-border musical styles ... and breathe new life into them, all while giving them a distinctly Colombian sheen."

Oye won a Premio Lo Nuestro award in 2008 for Album of the Year.

Their song "Bolero Falaz" topped Canal Viva Colombia's list of the 1,000 most important songs of Colombian rock, and several more of their songs also made the list, including "Maligno", "El Estuche", "Mujer Gala" and "Sortilegio".

In 2010 at "Premios Shock" event, they received a tribute produced by Cesar Lopez and Julio Monroy, with artists including Juan Galeano and EsteMan playing their songs.

== Discography ==
=== Studio albums ===
- 1993 - Con el Corazón en la Mano
- 1995 - El Dorado
- 1996 - La Pipa de la Paz
- 1998 - Caribe Atómico
- 2000 - Gozo Poderoso
- 2006 - Oye
- 2008 - Río
- 2018 - Claroscura
- 2021 - Tropiplop
- 2025 - Genes Rebeldes

=== Compilation albums ===
- 2000 - Serie 2000
- 2002 - Evolución
- 2004 - The Best of Aterciopelados: Ultimate Collection
- 2005 - 20 Éxitos Originales
- 2007 - Lo Esencial

=== Live albums ===
- 1997 - MTV Unplugged
- 2016 - Reluciente, Rechinante y Aterciopelado

== Sources ==
- "Aterciopelados Nominated for Two Latin Grammy Awards" (Press release). Nacional Records. August 2006.
- "Aterciopelados Biography: Contemporary Musicians (Enotes.com)". Archived from the original on 13 July 2009.
- "Aterciopelado telúrico (Semana.com)".
- "Héctor conexión, Héctor mensajero (visionchamanica.com)". Archived from the original on 25 January 2008.
- "The National Geographic Music Interview: Aterciopelados". Archived from the original on 9 April 2009.
- "Aterciopelados discuss the new album "Rio"" (Video Interview). YouTube. 14 October 2008. Archived from the original on 21 December 2021.
- "Aterciopelados Receive Two Latin Grammy Award Nominations for Their New Album Claroscura".
- "How Aterciopelados Keep Rewriting the Latin Alternative Playbook (rollingstone.com)". Rolling Stone.
