= Black Guayaba =

Puerto Rican rock band

Black:Guayaba
- Origin: Puerto Rico
- Genres: Rock
- Years active: 2000–present
- Members: Gustavo González; Javier Morales; Carlos "Toro" Ortiz; Carlos Colón; Abey Vázquez
- Past members: Gabriel Calero
- Website: BlackGuayaba.com

Black Guayaba, often spelled Black:Guayaba, is a Grammy-winning Puerto Rican rock band that was formed in 2000.

== Band history ==
=== Lo Demás Es Plástico ===
Black Guayaba originally began playing at local pubs and other private activities before dedicating full time to prepare original material for their first album. They released Lo Demás es Plástico in 2005, which was mixed by Bob St. John, who had previously worked with Ricky Martin, Duran Duran, Collective Soul, among others. Their second full-scale concert took place August 23, 2008 at the Coliseo Roberto Clemente---- their first appearance in Puerto Rico's premiere and high-capacity concert hall, a very exciting performance.

Lo Demás es Plástico spawned several hit singles like "Lejos", "Atrapado", and "Despacio". With the success, they received the opportunity to be the opening act of bands like Enanitos Verdes and Journey during their concerts in the island. In March 2006, they had their first concert held at the Luis A. Ferré Performing Arts Center. That same year they were nominated for a Latin Grammy as well as a Grammy.

=== No Hay Espacio ===
In 2007, the band released their second album titled No Hay Espacio. The first single of the album is called "Ayer". In February 2008, they won their first Grammy in the category of Latin Rock/Alternative Album.

Ayer and Sin Tu Amor were released as singles along with accompanying music videos.

=== La Conexión ===
La Conexión & La Conexión [Edición Especial]

In April 2012, the band released their third full-length studio album, titled La Conexión, after a 5-year gap from their last release.

The lead single from the effort was the song "Tú Lo Sabes Bien". Following the release of the album, "Tú Lo Sabes Bien" reached as far the #13 position in the Billboard Latin Pop Songs chart. A second single, called "Una Vida Sin Ti" - a collaboration between Tommy Torres and the band - was released in June, extending the successful reception given to them in Puerto Rico and the United States, as well as expanding their musical boundaries to other Latin American markets.

In 2013, La Conexión was nominated for a Latin Grammy in the Best Pop/Rock Album category. Later that year, Black:Guayaba signed a deal with VeneMusic/Universal Music Latin, and re-released a special edition (with 2 bonus tracks) of La Conexión, aptly titled La Conexión: Edición Especial.

Official music videos were made for the songs "Tu Lo Sabes Bien", "Esperando El Después", "Locos" and "Siempre" (feat. Jarabe De Palo).

Hoy

In late 2014, the band revealed they were working on a new album set to be released sometime in 2015, however, the plan was postponed. Instead, they released via iTunes, Spotify and other online retailers, an offshoot single called "Hoy". The single was released in two versions, electric and acoustic, along with an official music video.

Esta Navidad

By the end of 2015, they released a new single called "Esta Navidad" along its official music video. Part of the single's sales were donated to the American Cancer Society. The song was also featured in that year's local christmas Coca-Cola commercial.

Tocando Latidos

In the summer of 2018 the band re-recorded an alternate version of the song "Robar tu Corazón" called "Tocando Latidos" in association with Welch's Puerto Rico for the island's leading cardiovascular center "Centro Cardiovascular de Puerto Rico y el Caribe". 100% of the money collected was donated to the center.

=== Invencible ===
In 2017, Black:Guayaba announced their fourth studio album, titled Invencible, released in May. Two singles - Pronto Llegarás (another collaboration with singer/songwriter Tommy Torres) and Tarde o Temprano - were released in late 2016 along accompanying music videos, receiving considerable airplay and success ahead of the album release. The band has been touring Puerto Rico during 2016 and early 2017. Dulce Obscenidad co-written with Pedro Capó was their third single off Invencible. The song Invencible became their fourth single off the album with the same name and was featured in a Dodge commercial alongside fellow Puerto Rico native and MLB champion Carlos Correa.

== Band members ==
- Carlos R. Colón - keyboards
- Carlos "Toro" Ortiz - Bass
- Abey Vázquez - drums
- Gustavo González - vocals, guitar
- Javier Morales - Guitar

== Discography ==
Studio Albums

- Lo Demás Es Plástico (August 16, 2005)
- Lo Demás Es Plástico v2.0 (June 19, 2007)
- No Hay Espacio (September 18, 2007)
- La Conexión (April 9, 2012)
- La Conexión: Edición Especial (May 14, 2013)
- Invencible (May 12, 2017)
- La Fábrica de Sueños (May 24, 2024)
- Black Guayaba (May 30, 2025)

Live albums

- iTunes - Live from SoHo (July 15, 2008)

Singles

- Hoy (July 25, 2015)
- Esta Navidad (November 3, 2015)
- Esta Navidad - Acústica (November 30, 2017)
- Nunca Vamos a Parar (June 4, 2018)
- Tocando Latidos (August 16, 2018)

== Awards ==
2006 Latin Grammys:

- Best Rock Album by Duo or Group: Nominated

2006 Grammys:

- Best Latin Rock or Alternative Album: Nominated

2007 Grammys:

- Best Latin Rock or Alternative Album: Won

2008 Billboard Latin Music Awards

- (Latin Pop Albums) New Artist: Nominated
- (Latin Rock/Alternative) Album of the Year: Nominated
- (Latin Pop Airplay Song of the Year) New Artist: Nominated

2008 Latin Grammys:

- Best Latin Rock Song by Duo or Group: Nominated

2013 Latin Grammys:

- Best Pop/Rock Album: Nominated
