= The Monas =

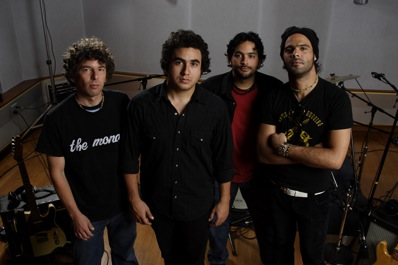
- The Monas at Criteria Studios

Background information
- Origin: Miami, Florida, US
- Genres: Rock; Latin rock
- Years active: 2005–present
- Labels: Persephone Music Group
- Members: Felipe Maria; Juan Davila; Nando Puche; Francisco Foschi
- Website: www.themonas.com

The Monas is a Colombian–American rock band from Miami, Florida.

== History ==
The Monas are best known for their top ten hit singles "Cae la Noche" and "Tu" on Latin Alternative Charts.

The Monas follow an old tradition of playing straight Rock and Roll for generations past and present. Felipe (vocals/guitar), Juan (drums), Nando (guitar) and Francisco (bass) hail from Barranquilla, Colombia and live in Miami. The band is considered a Supergroup in their community because they were all well known accomplished musicians before getting together.

The Monas self-titled debut album is available in the US under the Watts Up! record label and has been simultaneously released in Colombia and South America under Codiscos. The Monas won the 2006 Billboard Latin Conference New Artists Showcase, were invited to perform at the Latin Grammy Street party in Los Angeles on October 22, 2006 and were the first Rock Band from Colombia to perform at the SXSW Festival in Austin, Texas in April 2007.

Rolling Stone magazine Latin American edition gave the Monas 3 and 1/2 stars. The band released their second album titled Animal on April 23, 2013.

== Members ==
- Felipe Maria – vocals, guitar, harmonica
- Juan Davila – drums
- Nando Puche – guitars
- Francisco Foschi – bass

== Discography ==
- The Monas (2006)
- Animal (2013)
