= No Hay Espacio =

Studio album by Black Guayaba
- Released: September 18, 2007
- Length: 55:24
- Label: Machete Music

No Hay Espacio is a studio album by Black Guayaba, released on September 18, 2007, through Machete Music. In 2008, the album earned the group a Grammy Award for Best Latin Rock/Alternative Album.

== Track listing ==
No.	Title	Length
1.	"Escapar"	4:16
2.	"Ayer"	3:48
3.	"No Hay Espacio"	4:24
4.	"Peso de Amor"	4:06
5.	"Rara Melodía"	3:54
6.	"Como Quisiera"	4:25
7.	"Libertad"	4:26
8.	"Sin Tu Amor"	5:03
9.	"Café Entre Perfume"	4:05
10.	"Tu Prisión"	4:15
11.	"No Fui Yo"	4:24
12.	"Una Noche"	4:35
13.	"Más"	3:43
