= La Pipa de la Paz =

Studio album by Aterciopelados
- Released: November 1, 1996
- Recorded: September – October 1996
- Genre: Rock, Latin rock
- Length: 52:12
- Label: RCA International
- Producer: Phil Manzanera

Aterciopelados chronology
El Dorado (1995)	La Pipa de la Paz (1996)	Caribe Atómico (1998)

Singles from La Pipa de la Paz
- 1. "Baracunatana" Released: 1996; 2. "No necesito" Released: 1997; 3. "Cosita seria" Released: 1997

Professional ratings
Review scores
Source	Rating
Allmusic	4.5/5 stars

La Pipa de la Paz is the third studio album by Colombian band Aterciopelados. Produced by Phil Manzanera in London with this project they became the first Colombian artist to be nominated for a Grammy in the Best Latin Rock/Alternative Performance category. This album spawned some of their most well-known songs and greatest hits like Cosita Seria, Baracunatana, No Necesito, La Culpable, Expreso Amazonia, La Voz de la Patria, Te Juro Que No (featuring Enrique Bunbury) and the title track La Pipa de la Paz.

== Recording and production ==
The album was produced by Phil Manzanera of Roxy Music and recorded at his Gallery Studios based in London with an estimated budget of $150,000. Initially, there had been proposals to work with Daniel Melero and Draco Rosa which were ultimately unsuccessful. The recording sessions began in September and ended in October 1996, and the album was released in November. The first single, Baracunatana was released earlier in March.

== Album ==
La Pipa de la Paz preserves some of the punk influence of its preceding albums but achieves a more streamlined and harmonized rock sound with musical genres from different regions of Colombia such as Andean music, Joropo, Latin percussion and Vallenato. The lyrics that make up this project can be considered as the first conceptual work made by Aterciopelados, as Andrea positioned as an unconventional icon of Latin American women representing currents as anti-Machismo and neofeminism. Culturally, the contribution is also very significant, representing the defense of the Amazon, recognition and appreciation of indigenous roots and criticism of the specific situations in Colombia afflicted by armed conflict and drug trafficking.

La Pipa de la Paz has become one of the most well-known albums from Bogotá; It restates its main feature of unique and smooth blends with occasional acoustic guitars, airy vocals from Andrea Echeverri, a hard background bassist Hector Buitrago and drummer Alejandro Duque. The most prominent and played songs in Spanish America were Cosita Seria, No Necesito and Baracunatana which are still to this day are considered classics and in whose easily appreciated lyrics share the position of vindication of women in Latin society. An issue that is strong and scattered on songs throughout the album such as La Culpable (song performed entirely with Joropo instruments), The Juro Que No, Nada Que Ver and Chica Dificíl.

The title track greatly enhances Pre-Columbian culture while Expreso Amazonia exposes the natural and cultural wealth of the Colombian Amazon with a catchy rhythm while promoting it as an exotic tourist entertainment. As in their previous project, this album also has tracks that seek to raise awareness of the then reality of Colombian. Quemarropa is an open criticism of the armed conflict and calls for peaceful coexistence between brothers, La Voz de la Patria is a parody of a radio station of the time inviting freedom of expression and popular liberation of the third world. Música, Buena Estrella and Platónico are demonstrations of love and spirituality.

The sound involves Colombian bassist Chucho Merchan, Phil Manzanera on guitar on some tracks and backing vocals by Enrique Bunbury. Additionally, it incorporates Alejandro Gomez-Caceres as multi instrumentalist, giving the band a sound identity by use of non-traditional instruments such as the balalaika in Platónico and Accordion in Expreso Amazonia, maintained the familiar feature of innovation and experimentation Aterciopelado is known for.

== Track listing ==
No.	Title	Writer(s)	Length
1.	"Cosita Seria"	Buitrago, Echeverri	3:27
2.	"No Necesito"	Echeverri	3:44
3.	"Quemarropa"	Buitrago	3:25
4.	"Nada Que Ver"	Buitrago, Echeverri	3:19
5.	"La Culpable"	Buitrago, Echeverri	3:21
6.	"Expreso Amazonia"	Buitrago	3:47
7.	"Miss Panela"	Buitrago, Echeverri	3:47
8.	"Música"	Buitrago, Echeverri	3:30
9.	"Buena Estrella"	Buitrago	3:26
10.	"Baracunatana"	Leonidas Plaza	2:31
11.	"Platónico"	Echeverri	3:35
12.	"La Voz de la Patria"	Buitrago, Echeverri	3:49
13.	"Chica Difícil"	Buitrago, Echeverri	2:24
14.	"Te Juro Que No" (feat. Enrique Bunbury)	Buitrago	3:28
15.	"La Pipa de la Paz"	Buitrago, Echeverri	4:39

== Accolades ==
=== Album ===
Publication	Country	Accolade	Year	Rank	Ref.
Radiónica	Colombia	Colombian Rock: 100 Albums, 50 Years	2013	20	
Rock en las Américas	Latin America	50 Years of Hispanic American Rock in 250 albums	2006	184	
Alborde	USA	The 250 Most Important Ibero-American Rock Albums	2006	226	

=== Singles ===
Publication	Country	Song	Accolade	Year	Rank	Ref.
Rock en las Américas	Latin America	Baracunatana	The 120 Greatest Songs of Spanish American Rock	2009	118	
AutopistaROCK	Colombia	Baracunatana	Greatest 50 Colombian Rock Songs	2014	19	
