= Los Speakers =

- Also known as: The Speakers, The Colombian Beatles
- Origin: Bogotá, Colombia
- Genres: Rock; psychedelic rock
- Years active: 1963–1969
- Labels: Sello Vergara; Discos Bambuco; Producciones Kriss
- Past members: Humberto Monroy †; Rodrigo García; Roberto Fiorilli; Oscar Lasprilla; Oswaldo Hérnandez; Fernando Latorre †; Luis Dueñas †; Edgar Dueñas †

Los Speakers (the Speakers) were a beat and garage rock band from Bogotá, Colombia, active in the 1960s. Their particular style was characterized by the influence of early Beatles and the Byrds, as well as other popular music of the era. Later, they would experiment with other musical forms, such as psychedelic before their separation in late 1968.

While much of their recorded material consisted of covers of popular songs by acts such as the Beatles, not to mention other Latin American rock bands, such as Los Brincos, they began to write their own material as their sound evolved. Some of their original material is characterized by haunting, melancholic melodies and arrangements. Their albums are highly sought after by collectors, especially their final LP, which is considered their most experimental work.

The band began with the merging of two earlier groups, Dynamic (1961–1964), whose membership included Fernando Latorre, Alfredo Besoza and Humberto Monroy, and Electronic, whose roster included Luis and Edgar Duenas, children of the composer Luis Dueñas Knob. The earliest lineup of the Speakers was Rodrigo Garcia, from Spain (guitar) Colombian Humberto Monroy (bass), Fernando Latorre (drums) and guitarists Oswaldo Hernandez and Luis Dueñas. With this lineup, they supported Enrique Guzman, who was visiting Bogotá, in 1964. The Speakers became popular with the public during the beat group movement in Colombia .

== The band ==
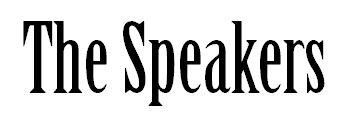
Logo

- Rodrigo Garcia – guitars, vocals, keyboards, percussion, violin, banjo, tiple, bass (1964–1969)
- Luis Dueñas – guitars, vocals (1964–1967)
- Oswaldo Hernandez – guitars, vocals, tiple (1964–1966)
- Humberto Monroy – bass, vocals, harmonica, percussion (1964–1969)
- Fernando Latorre – drums, backing vocals (1964–1965)
- Oscar Lasprilla – guitars, vocals, harmonica, keyboards, percussion (1967)
- Edgar Dueñas – drums (1966–1967)
- Roberto Fiorilli – drums, percussion, keyboards (1967–1969)

== Discography ==
- The Speakers (1965), Sello Vergara
- La Casa Del Sol Naciente (1965), Discos Bambuco
- Tuercas, Tornillos y Alicates (US Release 1966), Discos Bambuco
- The Speakers IV (1967), Discos Bambuco
- The Speakers En El Maravilloso Mundo De Ingeson (1968), Producciones Kriss
