= Nacional Records =

- Founded: 2005
- Genre: Various
- Official website: nacionalrecords.com

Nacional Records is an independent record label founded in 2005, based in Los Angeles. Nacional releases music in Rock, Hip Hop, Electronic, Musica Mexicana, and Pop, among other genres. Some artists, past and present, signed to the label include: Ana Tijoux, Manu Chao, Bomba Estéreo, Tom Tom Club, La Vida Boheme, Diego Garcia, Los Fabulosos Cadillacs, Los Amigos Invisibles, Jungle Fire, Nortec Collective, ChocQuibTown, El Mató a Un Policía Motorizado, Alex Anwandter, Tokyo Ska Paradise Orchestra, Cheo, YADAM, La Dame Blanche, Tomasa del Real, and Los Master Plus.

== History ==
Nacional Records was founded by Tomas Cookman in 2005. Cookman is the president and owner of Cookman International, a multi-faceted company that specializes in artist management, publishing, marketing, special events such as the Latin Alternative Music Conference (LAMC) and Supersonico, original content (La Hora Nacional TV show on MTV Tr3s and weekly radio show, LAMC Mixtape on SiriusXM) and the Latino Loop (a weekly industry newsletter emailed to over 100,000 tastemakers) among other endeavors.

The label's first album release was Aterciopelados lead singer Andrea Echeverri's self-titled solo album on March 8, 2005. It went on to be nominated for both a Grammy and a Latin Grammy. Since then, Nacional has released more than 100 albums, winning its first Latin Grammy in 2007 with Aterciopelados' Oye as Best Alternative Album and Manu Chao's "Me Llaman Calle" as Best Alternative Song. Other achievements since then include 51 Latin Grammy and Grammy wins and nominations.

Nacional Records released the first-ever Starbucks compilation of modern Latin music, Café Con Musica, which debuted at #1 on the Billboard World and Latin Pop charts.

Nacional Records music has appeared in many top movies, videogames, TV shows and commercials, including Breaking Bad, Jersey Shore, No Reservations with Anthony Bourdain, EA Sports' FIFA Games Series, Need For Speed, Jack & Jill, Fast Food Nation, Entourage, CSI Miami, Ugly Betty, Target, ESPN and others.

Since May 2013, Nacional Records and Search Party Music created together El Search Party, a new venture focusing on Latin music placement and licensing

In a June 2009 article about Nacional, Cookman was hailed as a "self-propelled phenom", by Jonny Whiteside in LA Weekly.

== Artists and releases (past and present) ==
- 4to Poder
- Álex Anwandter
- Agung Bagus
- Ana Tijoux
- Andrea Echeverri
- Astro
- Aterciopelados
- Banda de Turistas
- Bitman & Roban
- Black Uhuru
- Bomba Estereo
- Black Alonsho
- Ceci Bastida
- Choc Quib Town
- Diego Garcia
- DJ Bitman
- DJ Raff
- DJ Molechol
- El Hefe
- El Guincho
- Él Mató a un Policía Motorizado
- Elastic Bond
- Eric Bobo
- Fidel Nadal
- Fyahbwoy
- Fat Mike
- Gonzalo Yañez
- Hector Buitrago
- Hello Seahorse!
- Intoxicados
- Jarabe de Palo
- Jungle Fire
- KCRW Sounds Eclectico
- King Coya
- Kinky Sueño de la Máquina
- La Bien Querida
- La Casa Azul
- La mujer de mi hermano Soundtrack
- La Vida Bohème
- Latin Bitman
- Los Amigos Invisibles
- Los Bunkers
- Los Fabulosos Cadillacs
- Los Macuanos
- Los Nastys
- Los Tres
- Los Updates (digital release only)
- Maldita Vecindad
- Manu Chao
- Mark Cast
- Matorral Man
- Mexican Institute of Sound
- Mexrrissey
- Misterio
- Monareta
- Monica Lionheart
- Natalia Clavier
- NOFX
- Nicole
- Nortec Collective
- Nortec Collective Presents: Bostich and Fussible
- Nortec Collective Presents: Clorofila
- Ovni (digital release only)
- Pacha Massive
- Pecker (digital release only)
- Plastilina Mosh
- Quiero Club
- Raul Campos
- Raul Y Mexia
- Red Hot + Latin Redux (compilation)
- RH+
- Ritmo Machine
- Rizha
- Sam Bates
- Santé Les Amis
- Sara Valenzuela
- Señor Coconut
- Señor Flavio
- Systema Solar
- The Chamanas
- The Echocentrics
- The Pinker Tones
- Todos Tus Muertos
- Tonino Carotone
- Student Teachers
- Vlammen
- Willie Bobo
- Zizek
