= Héctor Buitrago =

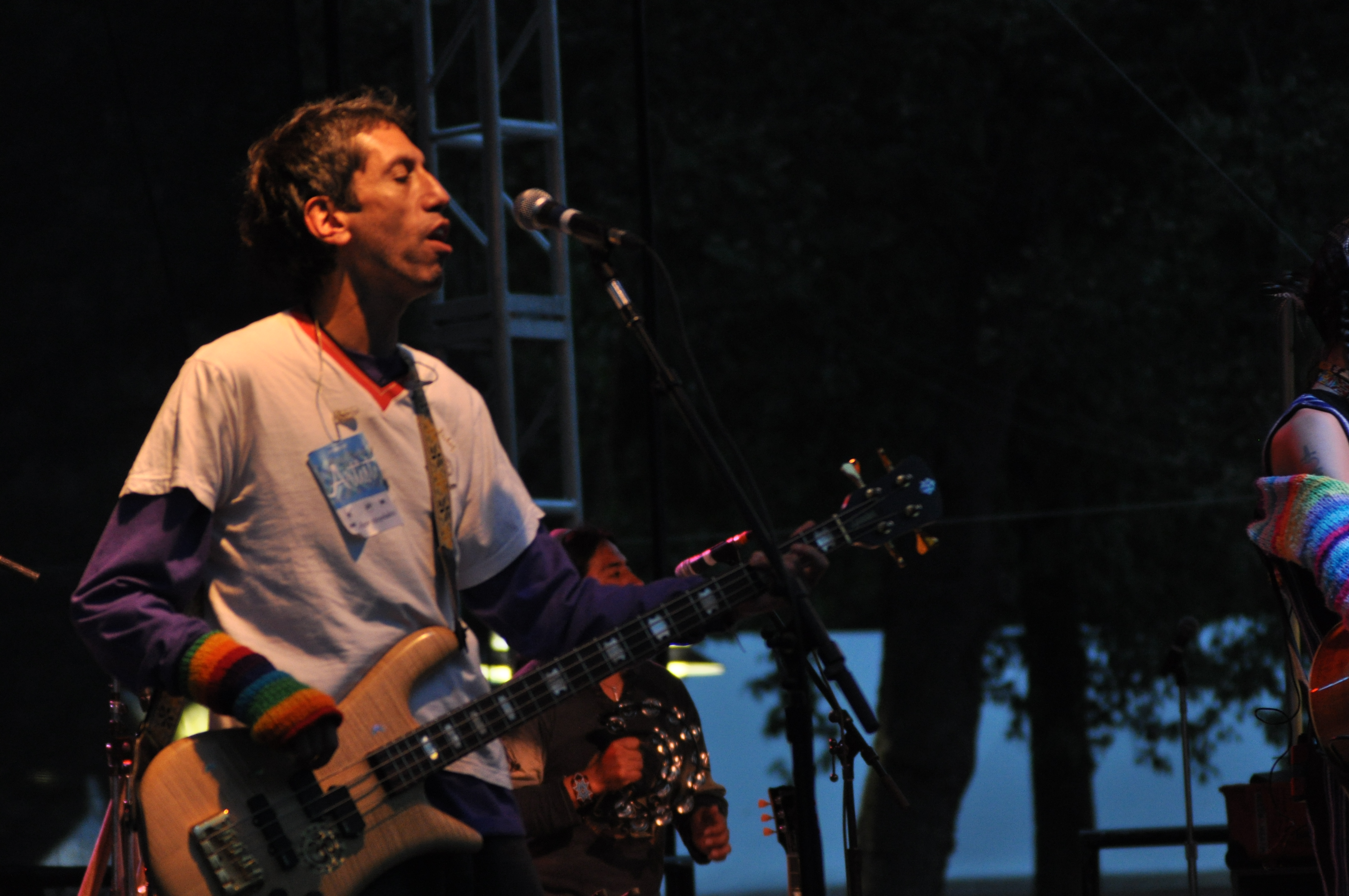
- Héctor Buitrago, 2010

Background information
- Origin: Colombia
- Label: Nacional Records
- Website: Hector Buitrago

Héctor Buitrago is the co-member of the multiple Grammy winning Colombian Latin alternative band Aterciopelados. Buitrago came from a hardcore rock background, heading a group called La Pestilencia, while co-member Andrea Echeverri had been drawn into the fledgling scene through art school friends. Buitrago and Echeverri went on to open one of Bogota's only rock clubs, and their relationship is one Latin rock's most successful artistic partnerships.

== Solo career ==
Hector Buitrago's Conector (a play on words between the homophone con Héctor, "with Héctor", and the word “connector”), released in 2006, marks the first solo project by the Aterciopelados co-founder, following in the footsteps of Aterciopelados frontwoman Andrea Echeverri, whose debut solo album was released a year before. Conector features guest vocals from an array of platinum-selling artists including Julieta Venegas, Álex Ubago and Echeverri, as well as some of Colombia's most acclaimed local musicians including Ever Suárez, Martina Camargo, and Noel Petro. The album is a musical and spiritual journey with Buitrago forming connections between different cultures, ways of thought and life through music. The album combines elements of contemporary rock and electronica with traditional Colombian and global rhythms as well as thoughtful and spiritual lyrics. The first single was “Altísimo” featuring the unlikely vocal pairing of Spanish pop artist Álex Ubago and Echeverri.

Connector II was released in April 2012.
