= Andrea Echeverri =

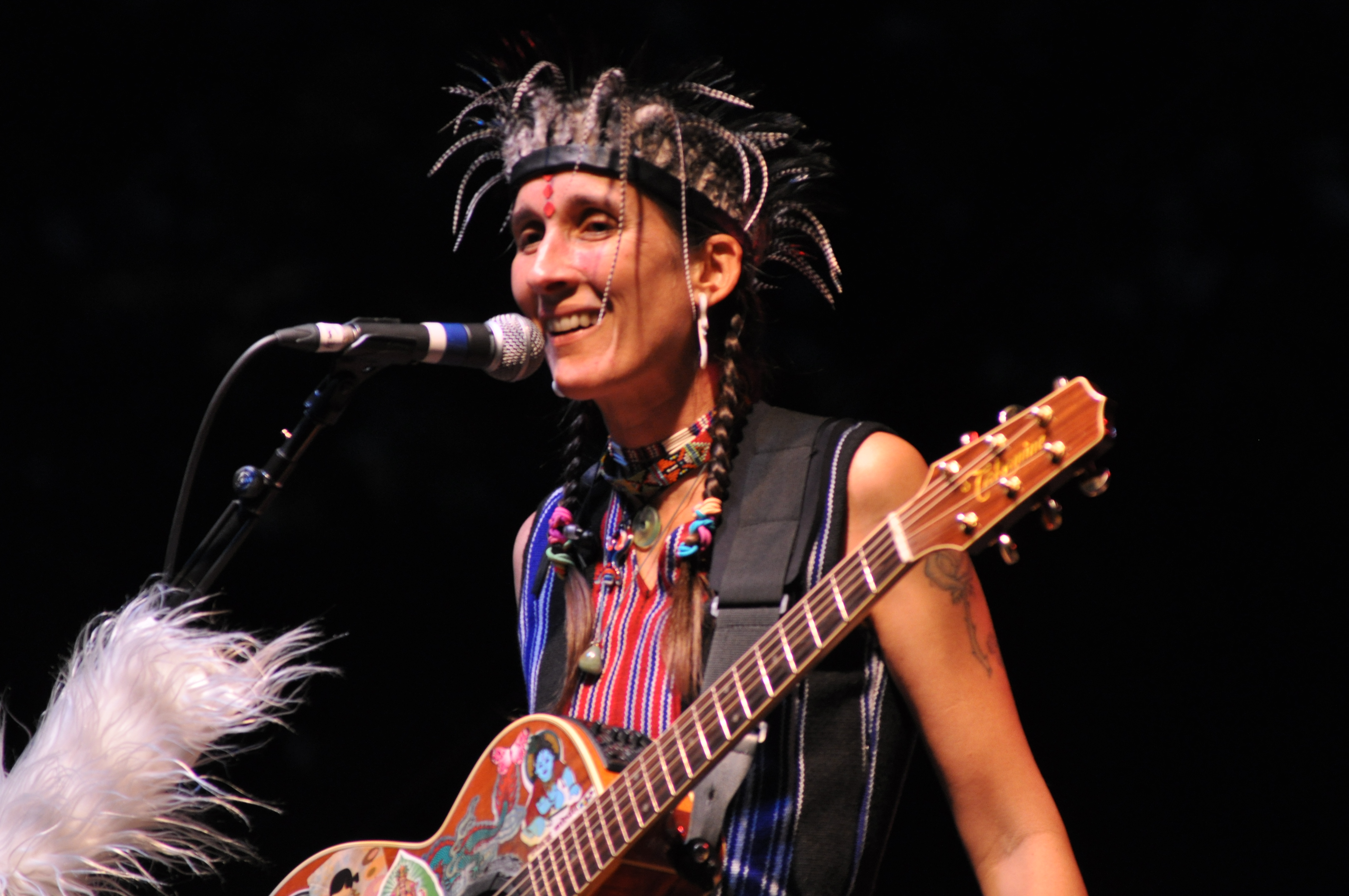
- Andrea Echeverri performing in 2010.

Background information
- Born: 13 September 1965 (age 61)
- Origin: Bogotá, Colombia
- Genres: Rock en español, Latin pop
- Labels: Nacional Records, EMI Music

Andrea Echeverri Arias (born 13 September 1965) is a Colombian rock/pop singer and guitarist. She holds a degree in Fine Arts from University of Los Andes and was a ceramist before becoming a musician. She is the lead singer in Aterciopelados where she also plays the acoustic guitar. In March 2005 her debut solo album Andrea Echeverri was released by Nacional Records, a label focused on promoting the best in Latin alternative music. According to NPR's Felix Contreras "It's possible to chart the development of Latin Alternative music by following the career of Andrea Echeverri."

== Solo career ==
After the critical and commercial success of 2000's Gozo Poderoso, which landed Aterciopelados on the Top 10 of the Billboard Top Latin Albums Sales chart as well as a coveted appearance on The Tonight Show with Jay Leno, Echeverri took time off for the birth of her first child Milagros, who has proven to be a new point of artistic inspiration. The result is the self-titled album Andrea Echeverri, her first solo release. The disc was produced by Héctor Buitrago from Aterciopelados and mixed by Thom Russo (Juanes, Kinky, Johnny Cash), and also features a remix from Richard Blair (Sidestepper).

On "A Eme O", the album's upbeat first single, Echeverri sings “Since you were born, I've become a better lover. Its as if you've unplugged my tubes.” On the chill-out lullaby track "Baby Blues" (which was featured in the soundtrack for the film La mujer de mi hermano), she observes the bond between mother and daughter as Milagros cries late at night. "Some songs are written for Milagros, but they sound like they're written for a lover," said Andrea. Going ever further, she satirizes the highly sexualized lyrics of the Colombian genre called champeta, naming one of the album's tracks "Lactochampeta". “It's kind of a joke, because it has explicit lyrics about lactating,” muses Andrea.

== Performances and projects ==
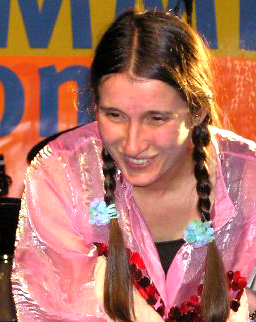
Echeverri (2006)

A series of tour dates followed the album's release, including headlining the Latin Alternative Music Conference's Women Who Rock concert in front of 10,000 people at the Santa Monica Pier in Los Angeles, as well as the La Banda Elastica Magazine Awards.

In December 2007 Echeverri exhibited her ceramic works at the Feria del Libro in Guadalajara, Mexico, where she also performed with Aterciopelados.

== Recognitions ==
In 2005 the album "Andrea Echeverri" was nominated for a Latin Grammy Award for “Best Female Pop Vocal Album.” The album was nominated for a Grammy Award for "Best Latin Pop Album" in 2006.

For the MTV-LA Awards in 2005, Echeverri was nominated in four categories, winning for “Best New Artist – Central.”

In 2006 the album received two nominations for the Premios Lo Nuestro Awards – "Rock Album of the Year" and "Song of the Year" for the single “A Eme O.”

== Aterciopelados ==
Echeverri is currently working and performing with Héctor Buitrago in their group Aterciopelados. Their album "Oye", released by Nacional Records in 2006 won a Latin Grammy for "Best Alternative Album" in November 2007. In November 2010 he released his second album as a solo artist, entitled DOS, an emancipated, self-produced, neo-hippie and maternal album.

== Discography ==
=== Studio albums ===
List of albums, with selected chart positions
Title	Album details
Andrea Echeverri	Released: March 8, 2005; Label: EMI Music, Nacional Records; Format: CD
Dos	Released: August 23, 2011; Label: Nacional Records; Format: CD, digital download
Ruiseñora	Released: August 19, 2013; Label: Nacional Records; Format: CD, digital download

=== Extended plays ===
List of albums, with selected chart positions
Title	Album details
Live Session (iTunes Exclusive) (with Aterciopelados)	Released: November 8, 2005; Label: Universal Music; Format: Digital download

== Awards and nominations ==
=== Grammy Awards ===
The Grammy Award is an accolade by the National Academy of Recording Arts and Sciences of the United States to recognize outstanding achievement on the music industry. Andrea Echeverri has had one nomination.

Year	Nominee / work	Award	Result
2006	Andrea Echeverri	Best Latin Pop Album	Nominated

=== Latin Grammy Awards ===
A Latin Grammy Award is an accolade by the Latin Academy of Recording Arts & Sciences to recognize outstanding achievement in the music industry. Andrea Echeverri has had two nominations.

Year	Nominee / work	Award	Result
2005	Andrea Echeverri	Best Female Pop Vocal Album	Nominated
2013	Ruiseñora	Best Singer-Songwriter Album	Nominated
