= Latin Grammy Award for Best Rock Song =

- Awarded for: quality rock music songs
- Country: United States
- Presented by: The Latin Recording Academy
- First award: 2000
- Currently held by: The Warning for "Ego" (2026)
- Website: latingrammy.com

The Latin Grammy Award for Best Rock Song is an honor presented annually at the Latin Grammy Awards, a ceremony that recognizes excellence and creates a wider awareness of cultural diversity and contributions of Latin recording artists in the United States and internationally. The award is reserved to the songwriters of a new song containing at least 51% of the lyrics in Spanish. Instrumental recordings or cover songs are not eligible. Songs in Portuguese may be entered in the Brazilian field.

The award has been given every year since the 1st Latin Grammy Awards ceremony being presented to the Argentine singer-songwriter Fito Páez with the song "Al Lado del Camino".

The award has been presented to songwriters originating from Argentina, Colombia and Mexico. Colombian musician Juanes is the biggest winner in this category, having won in all the four occasions he's been nominated for (2001, 2002, 2003 and 2005). Other multiple winners are Gustavo Cerati with three wins out of four nominations; and Emmanuel de Real of Café Tacvba and Juan Galeano of Diamante Eléctrico, both winning twice. Beto Cuevas holds the record for most nominations without a win with four.

== Recipients ==
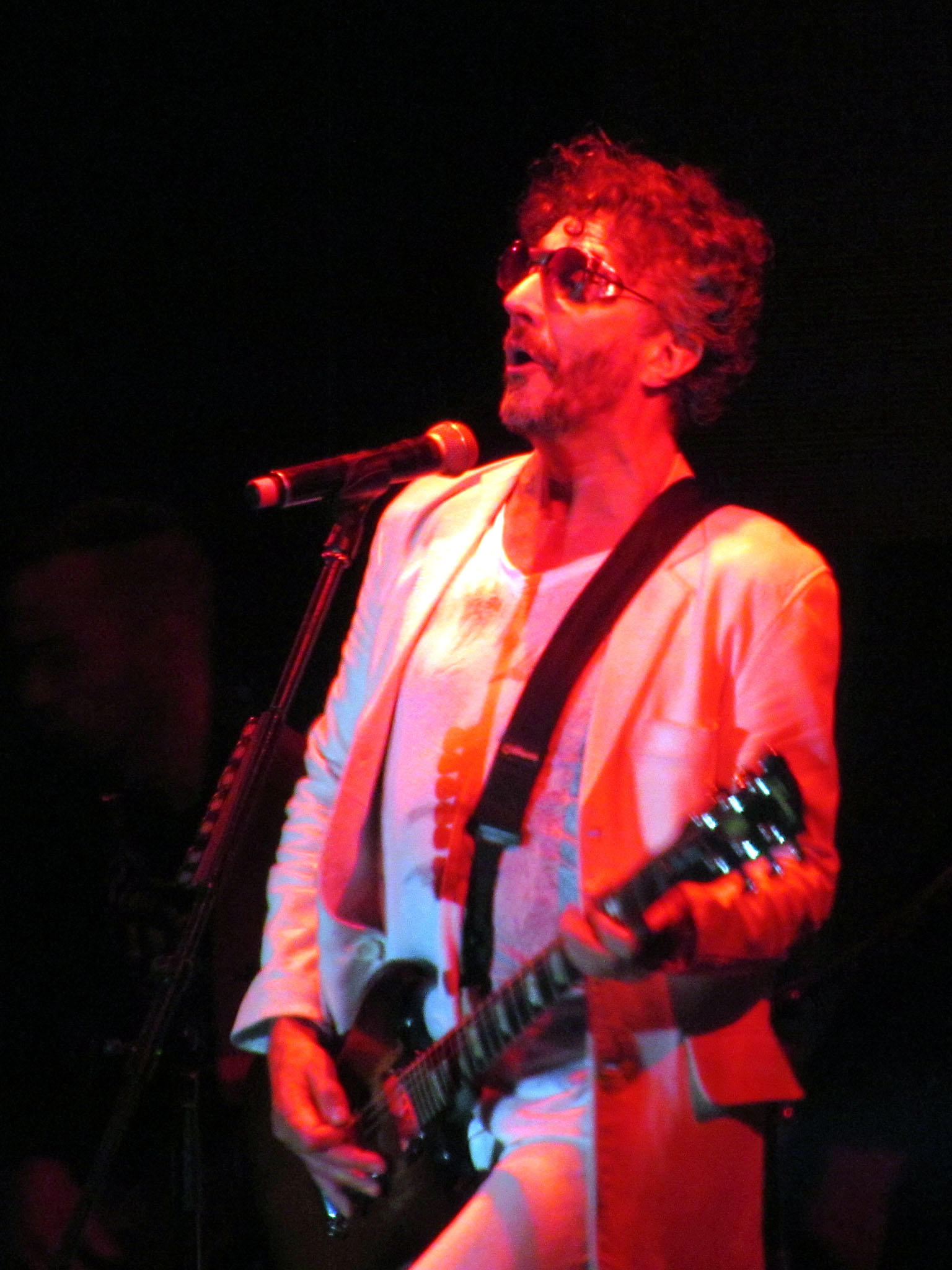
Four-time winner Fito Páez.

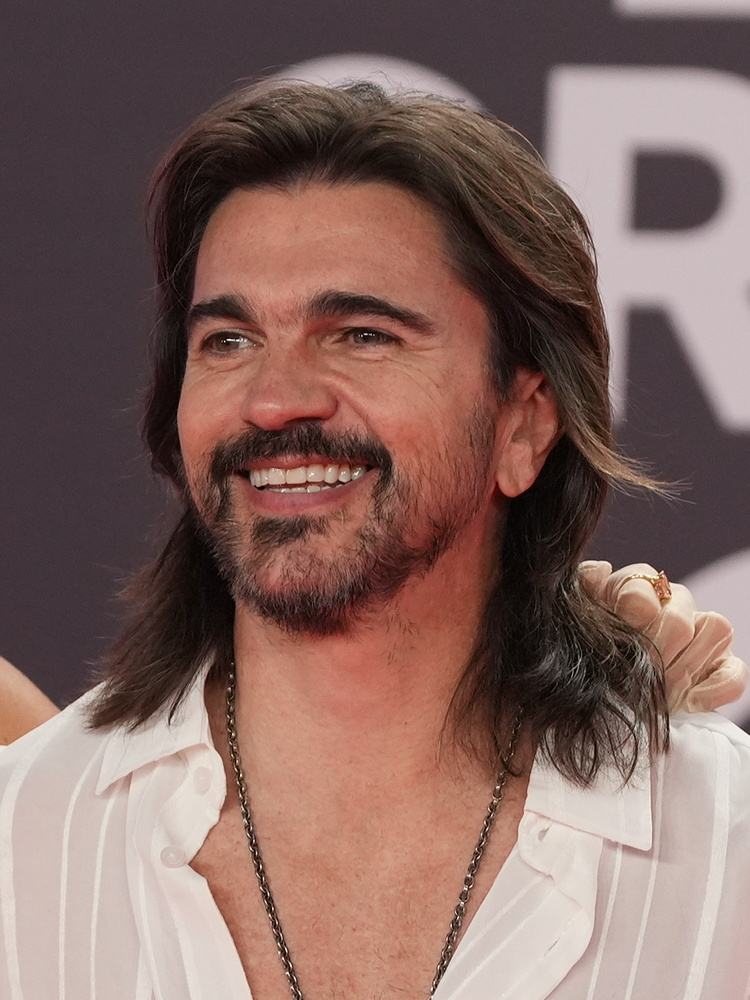
Four-time winner Juanes.

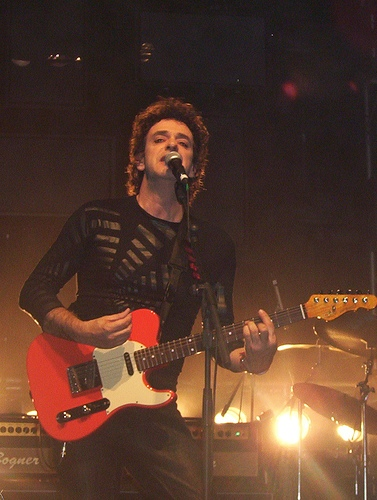
Three-time winner Gustavo Cerati.

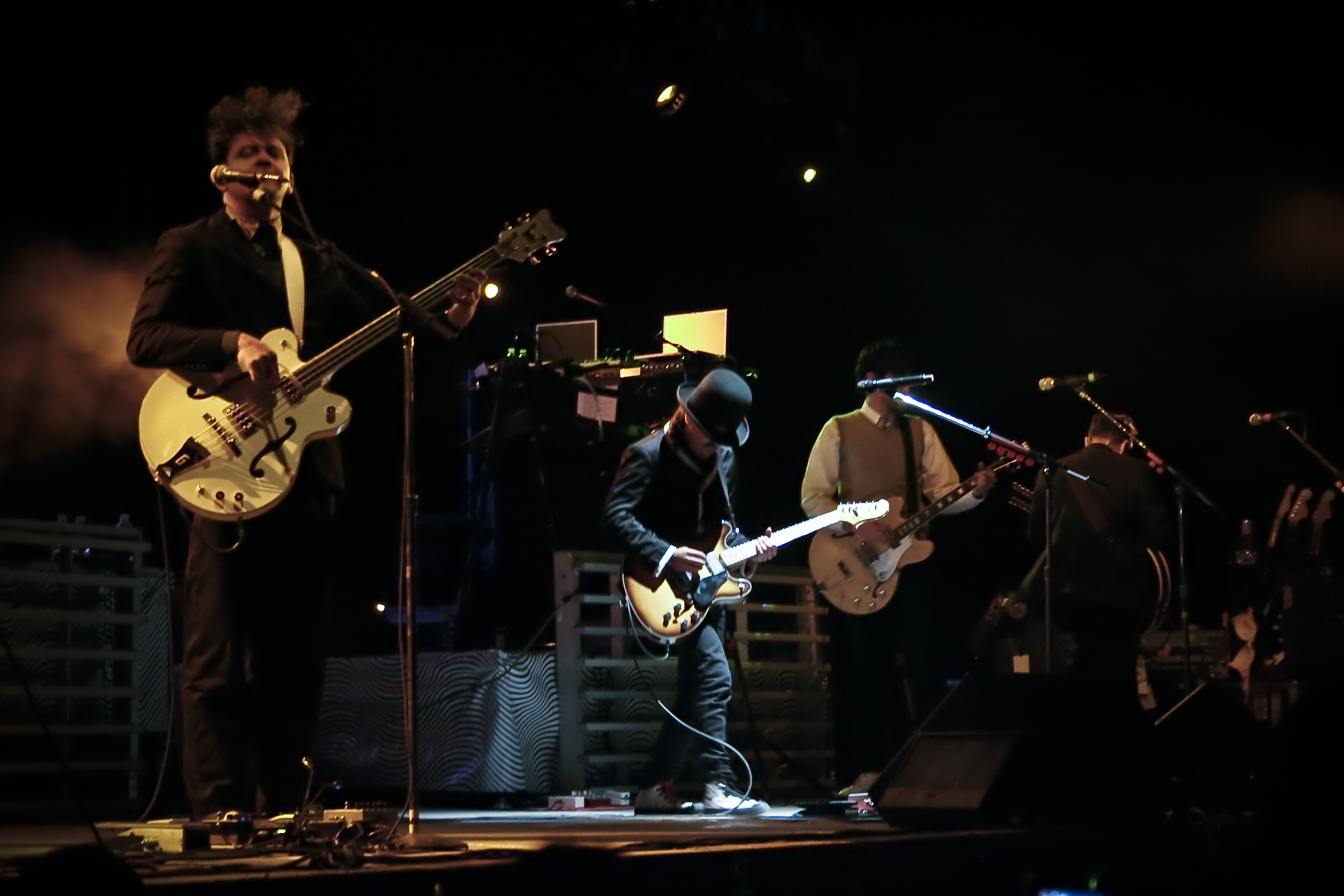
Two-time winners Café Tacvba.

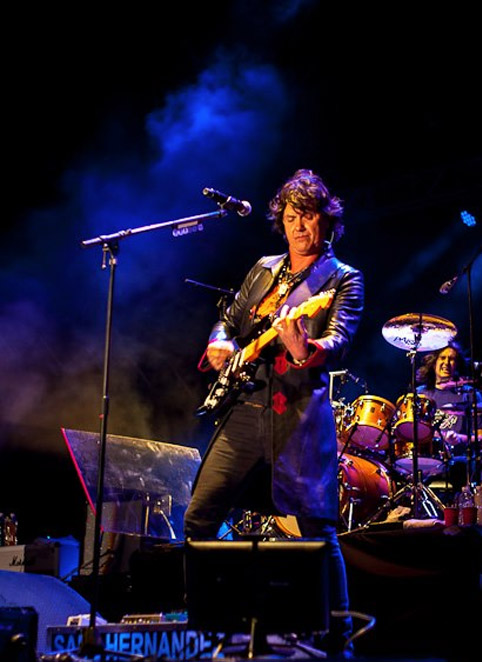
Jaguares frontman Saúl Hernández won in 2009.

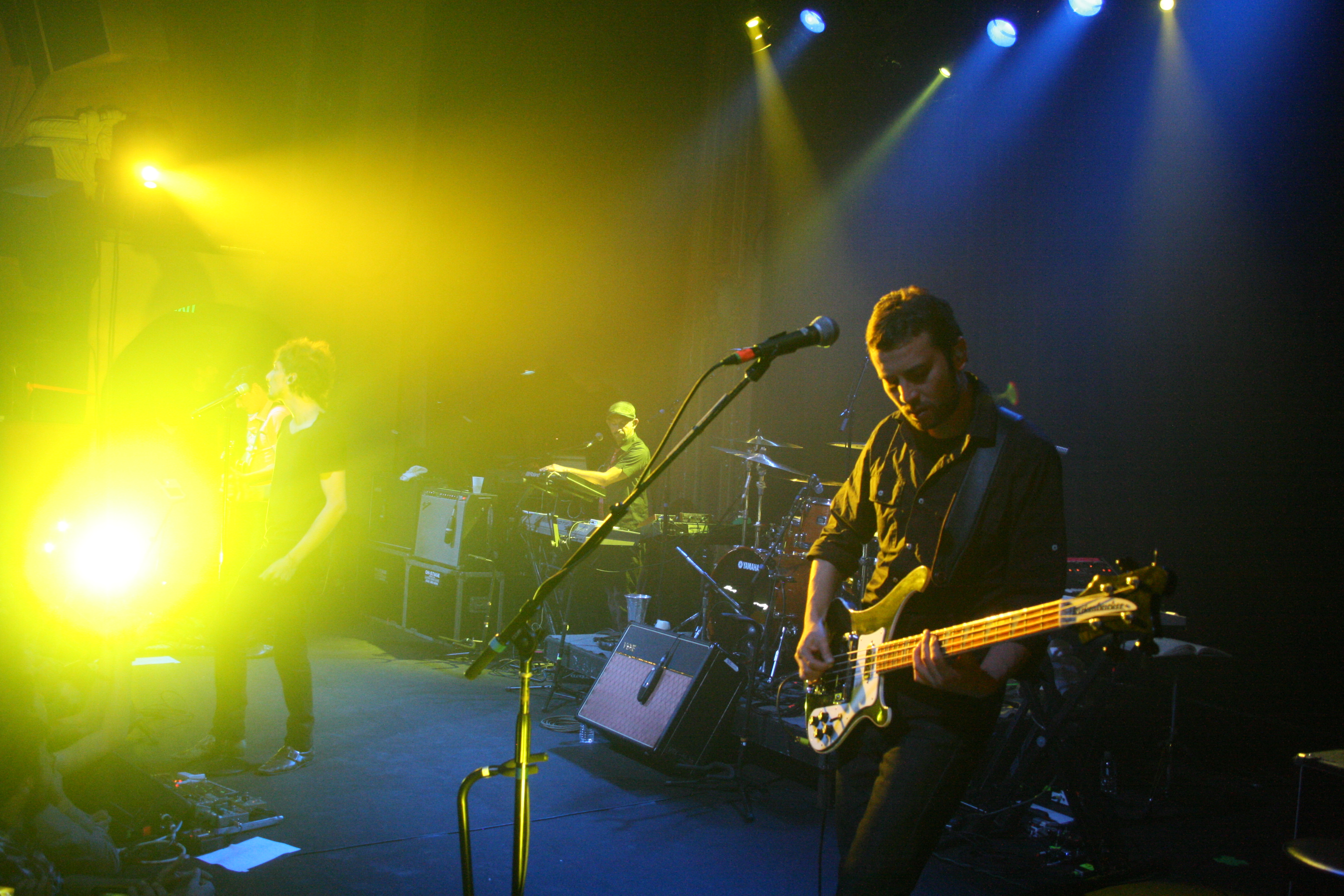
2011 winners Zoé.

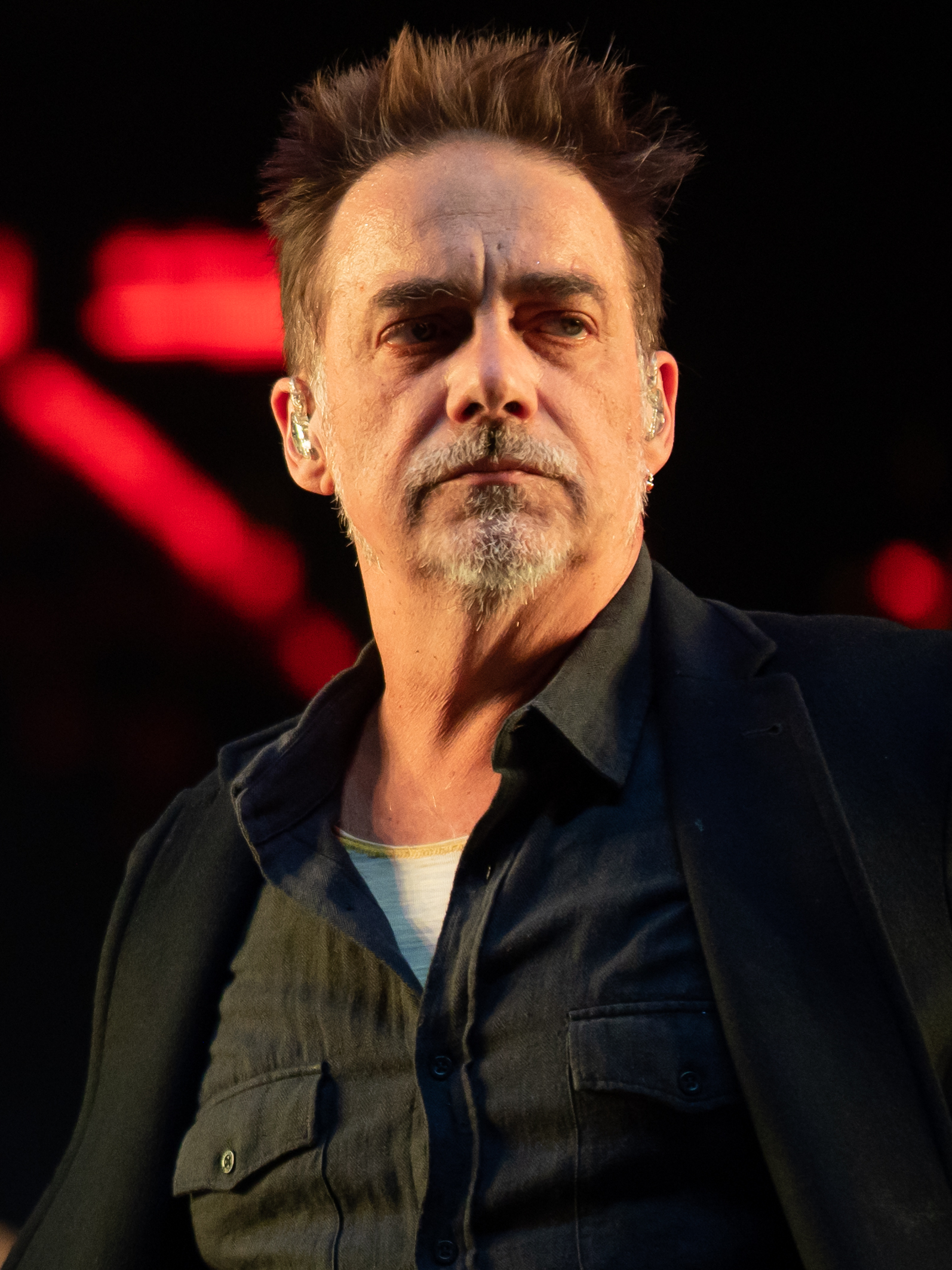
Three-time winner Vicentico.

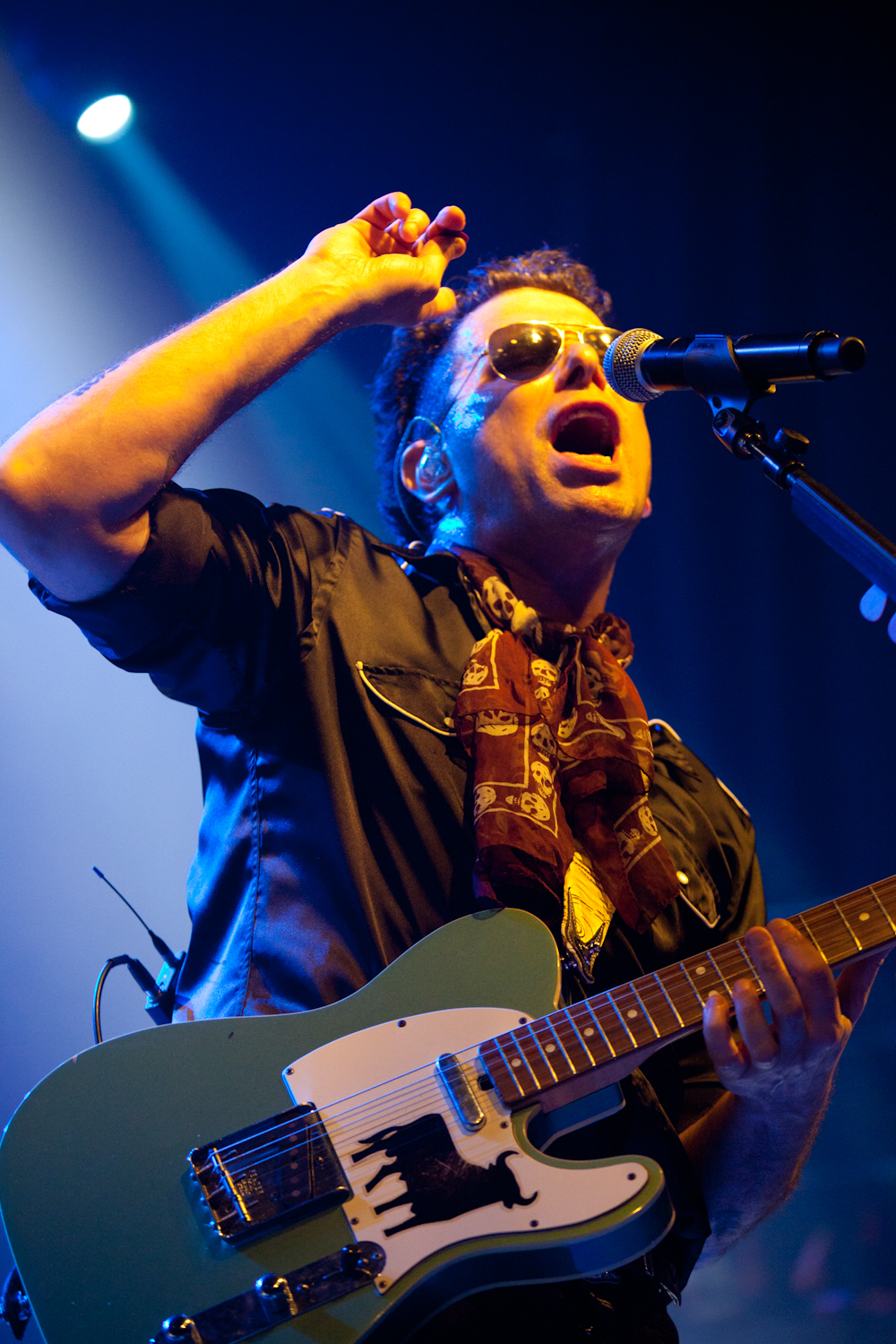
Three-time winner Andrés Calamaro.

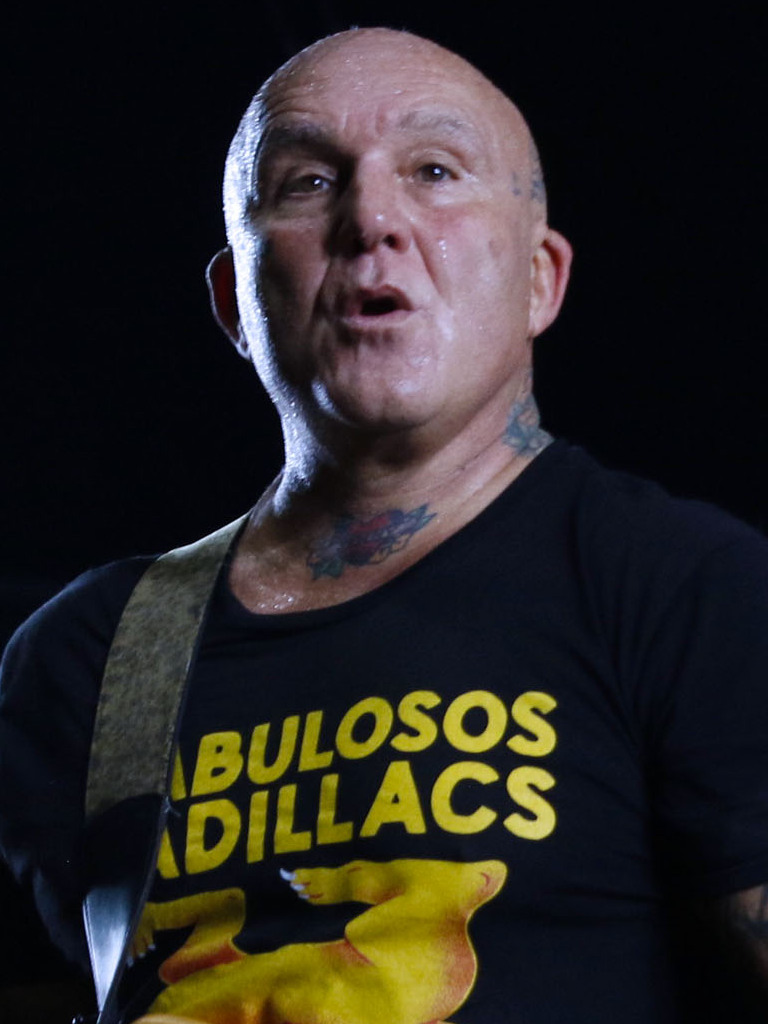
Los Fabulosos Cadillacs frontman Flavio Cianciarulo won in 2016.

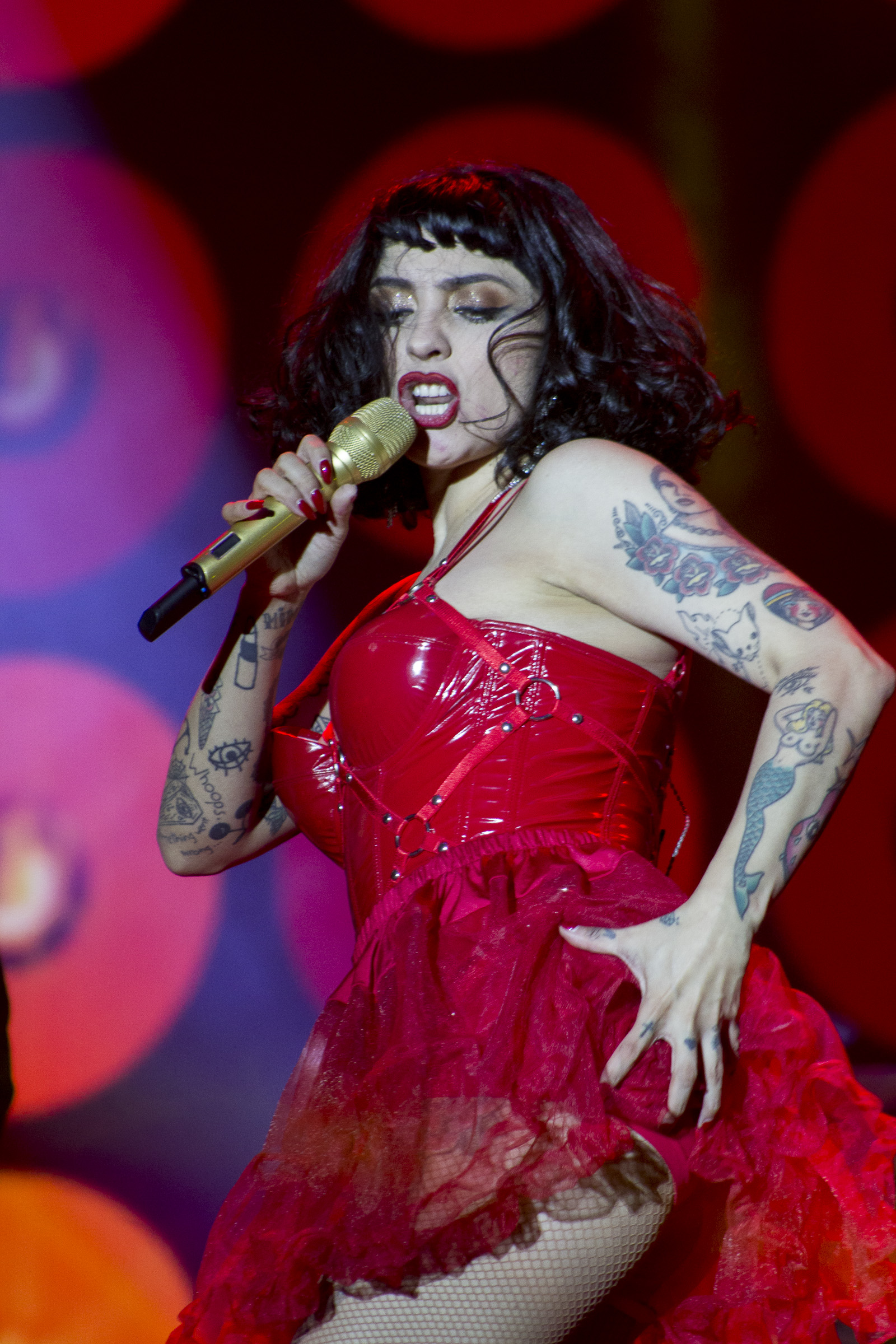
2020 winner Mon Laferte.

Year^{[I]}	Songwriter(s)	Work	Performing artist(s)^{[II]}	Nominees^{[III]}	Ref.
2000	Fito Páez	"Al Lado del Camino"	Fito Páez	Beto Cuevas and Aldo Nova – "Aquí" (La Ley); Saúl Hernández – "Fín" (Jaguares); Gustavo Cerati – "Puente" (Gustavo Cerati); Fermin Caballero, Raul Chapa and Jason Roberts – "Si Señor" (Control Machete)	
2001	Juanes	"Fíjate Bien"	Juanes	Pau Donés, Carmen Niño, Alex Tenas, Jordi Busquets and Riki Frouchtman – "De Vuelta y Vuelta" (Jarabe de Palo); Andrea Echeverri and Héctor Buitrago – "El Álbum" (Aterciopelados); Fito Páez – "El Diablo De Tu Corazón" (Fito Páez); Julieta Venegas – "Hoy No Quiero" (Julieta Venegas)	
2002	Juanes	"A Dios le Pido"	Juanes	Reyli Barba and Rafael López – "Así Es La Vida" (Elefante); Luis Alberto Spinetta – "El Enemigo" (Spinetta); León Gieco and Luis Gurevich – "Idolo De Los Quemados" (León Gieco); Beto Cuevas – "Mentira" (La Ley)	
2003	Juanes	"Mala Gente"	Juanes	Beto Cuevas and Humberto Gatica – "Amate y Salvate" (La Ley); Natalia Lafourcade – "En El 2000" (Natalia Lafourcade); Miky Huidobro, Paco Ayala and Randy Ebright – "Frijolero" (Molotov); Shakira – "Te Aviso, Te Anuncio (Tango)" (Shakira)	
2004	Emmanuel del Real	"Eres"	Café Tacuba	Ismael "Tito" Fuentes – "Here We Kum" (Molotov); Miguel "Mickey" Huidobro – "Hit Me" (Molotov); Desmond Child, Alejandra Guzmán and Jordi Mar – "Lipstick" (Alejandra Guzmán); Beto Cuevas – "Mi Ley" (La Ley)	
2005	Juanes	"Nada Valgo Sin Tu Amor"	Juanes	Beto Cuevas – "Bienvenido Al Anochecer" (La Ley); Martin Chan and JD Natasha – "Lágrimas" (JD Natasha); Fito Páez – "Polaroid de Ordinaria Locura" (Fito Páez); J. L. Abreu and Egui Santiago – "Un Accidente" (Circo)	
2006	Gustavo Cerati	"Crimen"	Gustavo Cerati	Chetes – "Completamente" (Chetes); Rodrigo Dávila – "Dime Ven" (Motel); Jorge Pardo – "Un Dia No Vuelvo A Empezar" (Jorge Prado); Mario Domm and Alejandra Guzmán – "Volverte A Amar" (Alejandra Guzmán)	
2007	Gustavo Cerati	"La Excepción"	Gustavo Cerati	Bruno Bressa, Chalo Galván and Gerardo Galván – "Monitor" (Volován); Arturo Arredondo, José Madero Vizcaíno, Ricardo Treviño and Jorge Vázquez – "Narcisista por Excelencia"(Panda); Gustavo F. Napoli – "Un Dia No Vuelvo A Empezar" (La Renga); Roberto Musso – "Yendo A La Casa de Damian" (El Cuarteto de Nos)	
2008	Rubén Albarrán, Emmanuel del Real, Enrique Rangel & Joselo Rangel	"Esta Vez"	Café Tacvba	Javier Morales – "Ayer" (Black Guayaba); Andrés Calamaro and Cachorro López – "Carnaval de Brasil" (Andrés Calamaro); Andrés Calamaro – "Mi Gin Tonic" (Andrés Calamaro); Randy Ebright – "Yofu" (Molotov)	
2009	Saúl Hernández	"Entre Tus Jardines"	Jaguares	Walter Giardino – "El Reino Olvidado " (Rata Blanca); Enrique Bunbury – "Hay Muy Poca Gente" (Bunbury); Jose Luis Belmonte, Diego Frenkel and Sebastián Schachte – "Qué Me Vas a Decir" (La Portuaria); Airbag – "Una Hora a Tokio" (Airbag)	
2010	Gustavo Cerati	"Déjà Vu"	Gustavo Cerati	Chetes – "Arena" (Chetes); Sebastián Franco, Jesús Herrera, Amauri Sepúlveda, Diego Suárez and Marcos Zavala – "Cárcel" (Bengala); Bruno Albano Naughton, Luis G. Balcarce, Guido Colzani, Daniel Melero, Tomas Putruele, Diego "Uma" Rodriguez, Tuta Torres and Patricio Troncos – "Lo Comandas" (Banda de Turistas); Andrés Calamaro – "Los Divinos" (Andrés Calamaro)	
2011	León Larregui and Zoé	"Labios Rotos"	Zoé	Carajo – "Ácido" (Carajo); Emiliano Brancciari – "Chau" (No Te Va Gustar); Gustávo Napoli – "Poder" (La Renga); La Vida Bohème – "Radio Capital" (La Vida Bohème)	
2012	Roberto Musso	"Cuando Sea Grande"	El Cuarteto de Nos	Manuel Diquez – "Anti Idolo" (Manuel Diquez); Leo Felipe Campos & Ulises Hadjis – "Dónde Va" (Ulises Hadjis); Doctor Krápula – "Exigimos" (Doctor Krápula); Luis Jiménez – "Indeleble" (Los Mesoneros)	
2013	Cachorro López and Vicentico	"Creo Que Me Enamoré"	Vicentico	Emiliano Brancciari – "A las Nueve" (No Te Va Gustar); Erik Canales – "16" (Allison); Henry D'Arthenay – "Hornos de Cal" (La Vida Bohème); DLD – "Todo Cuenta" (DLD)	
2014	Andrés Calamaro	"Cuando No Estás"	Andrés Calamaro	Rubén Albarrán, Doctor Krápula, Roco Pachukote and Moyenei Valdez – "Ama-Zonas" (Doctor Krápula); Enrique Bunbury – "Despierta" (Bunbury); Emmanuel Del Real and Juanes – "Mil Pedazos" (Juanes); Clemente Castillo, Charly Castro and Flip Tamez – "Sin Respuesta" (Jumbo); Jarabe de Palo – "Somos" (Jarabe de Palo featuring Gabylonia and Montse "La Duende")	
2015	Cachorro López and Vicentico	"Esclavo de Tu Amor"	Vicentico	Charliepapa – "Astrómetra" (Charliepapa); Daniel Aceves and Jotdog – "Celebración" (Jotdog); Adolfo Cabrales and Carlos Raya – "Entre la Espada y la Pared" (Fito & Fitipaldis); Daniel Álvarez and Juan Galeano – "Todo Va A Arder" (Diamante Eléctrico)	
2016	Flavio Cianciarulo	"La Tormenta"	Los Fabulosos Cadillacs	Asier Cazalis – "Abismo" (Caramelos de Cianuro); Gustavo Cordera – "Fantasma Soy" (Cordera); Luisina Bertoldi, Brenda Martín and Gabriel Pedernera – "Nada Salvaje" (Eruca Sativa); Massacre – "Niña Dios" (Massacre)	
2017	Juan Galeano	"Déjala Rodar"	Diamante Eléctrico	Eruca Sativa – "Armas Gemelas" (Eruca Sativa); Rafael Bonilla & Jorge Holguín Pyngwi – "Dias Contados" (Rafa Bonilla); Emiliano Brancciari – "Para Cuando Me Muera" (No Te Va Gustar); Enrique Rangel – "Que No" (Café Tacvba)	
2017	Andrés Calamaro	"La Noche"	Andrés Calamaro	Eruca Sativa – "Armas Gemelas" (Eruca Sativa); Rafael Bonilla & Jorge Holguín Pyngwi – "Dias Contados" (Rafa Bonilla); Emiliano Brancciari – "Para Cuando Me Muera" (No Te Va Gustar); Enrique Rangel – "Que No" (Café Tacvba)	
2018	Fito Páez	"Tu Vida Mi Vida"	Fito Páez	Santiago Motorizado – "Ahora Imagino Cosas" (Él Mató A Un Policía Motorizado); Richard Coleman – "Días Futuros" (Richard Coleman); Enrique Bunbury – "La Actitud Correcta" (Bunbury); Leiva – "La Llamada" (Leiva)	
2019	Andrés Calamaro and German Wiedemer	"Verdades Afiladas"	Andrés Calamaro	Rodrigo Crespo – "Conectar" (Rodrigo Crespo); Leiva – "Gozilla" (Leiva featuring Enrique Bunbury and Ximena Sariñana); Arawato – "Nirvana" (Arawato); Roberto Musso – "Punta Cana" (El Cuarteto de Nos)	
2020	Mon Laferte	"Biutiful"	Mon Laferte	Eduardo Ibeas, Felipe Ilabaca & Cristian Moraga – "Bola de Fuego" (Chancho en Piedra); Eruca Sativa – "Creo" (Eruca Sativa); Roberto Musso – "Mario Neta" (El Cuarteto de Nos); Buika, Drago, Carlos Santana, Stoneface & Jay U Xperience – "Yo Me Los Merezco" (Santana featuring Buika)	
2021	Vicentico	"Ahora 1"	Vicentico	Andrés Giménez & Andreas Kisser – "Distintos" (De La Tierra); Santi Balmes & Julián Saldarriaga – "El Sur" (Love of Lesbian featuring Bunbury); Anabella Cartolano – "Hice Todo Mal" (Las Ligas Menores); Emiliano Brancciari & Nicki Nicole – "Venganza" (No Te Va Gustar & Nicki Nicole)	
2022	Fito Páez	"Lo Mejor de Nuestras Vidas"	Fito Páez	Eruca Sativa – "Día Mil" (Eruca Sativa); Bunbury – "Esperando una Señal" (Bunbury); Juan Manuel Latorre – "Finisterre" (Vetusta Morla); Molotov – "No Olvidamos" (Molotov); WOS & Facundo Yalve – "QUE SE MEJOREN" (WOS)	
2023	Juan Galeano	"Leche de Tigre"	Diamante Eléctrico featuring Adrian Quesada	Andrés Giménez & Andreas Kisser – "Depredadores" (De La Tierra); Todo Aparenta Normal – "El Piso es Lava" (Todo Aparenta Normal featuring An Espil & Evlay); Juanes – "Gris" (Juanes); Arde Bogotá – "Los Perros" (Arde Bogotá)	
2024	Jesús Quintero & Draco Rosa	"No Me Preguntes (Live)"	Draco Rosa	Diamante Eléctrico & Andrés Kenguan – "Algo Bueno Tenía Que Tener (Bogotá)" (Diamante Eléctrico); Viniloversus – "Animal Temporal" (Viniloversus); Ali Stone – "Camaleónica" (Ali Stone); Anton Curtis Delost, Shaun Lopez, Kathryn Ostenberg, Monica Velez & The Warning – "Qué Más Quieres" (The Warning)	
2025	Nicole Shirel Davidovich, RENEE & Pablo Stipicic	"La Torre"	RENEE	Andrés Giménez – "Legado" (A.N.I.M.A.L.); Ali Stone – "TRNA" (Ali Stone); Eruca Sativa – "Volarte" (Eruca Sativa)	
2025	Fito Páez	"Sale el Sol"	Fito Páez	Andrés Giménez – "Legado" (A.N.I.M.A.L.); Ali Stone – "TRNA" (Ali Stone); Eruca Sativa – "Volarte" (Eruca Sativa)	
2026	Anton Curtis Delost, Mónica Vélez, Niko Rubio, Alejandra Villarreal, Daniela Villarreal & Paulina Villarreal	"Ego"	The Warning	Juan Victor Belisario, Rodrigo Gonsalves, Orlando Martinez & Emerson Swinford – "Destruirse" (Viniloversus); Fito Páez – "Las Fuerzas Armadas del Amor" (Fito Páez); Draco Rosa – "Montserrat" (Draco Rosa); Dillom, Franco Dolzani, Eugenio García Carlés & Fermín Ugarte – "Rojo Profundo" (Dillom)	

- ^{^[I]} Each year is linked to the article about the Latin Grammy Awards held that year.
- ^{^[II]} The performing artist is only listed but does not receive the award.
- ^{^[III]} Showing the name of the songwriter(s), the nominated song and in parentheses the performer's name(s).

== See also ==
- Latin Grammy Award for Best Rock Album
- Latin Grammy Award for Song of the Year
- Lo Nuestro Award for Rock/Alternative Song of the Year
