= Eruca Sativa =

Argentine alternative rock band

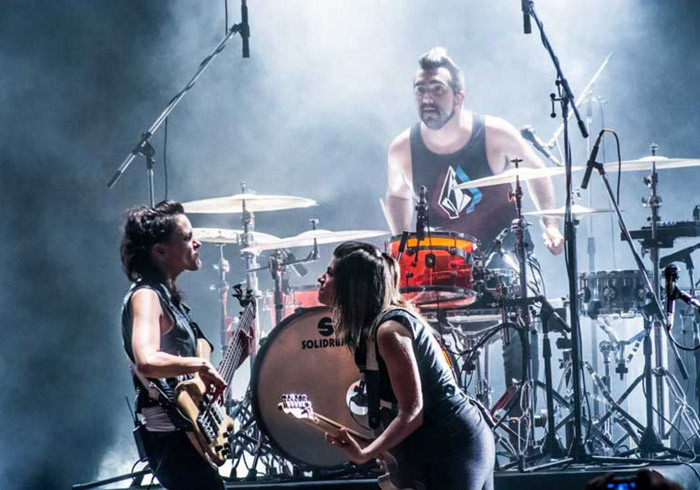
- Eruca Sativa performing in 2014

Background information
- Origin: Córdoba, Argentina
- Genres: Hard rock; alternative rock
- Years active: 2007–present
- Labels: Marca Tus Marcas Discos; Sony
- Members: Lula Bertoldi; Brenda Martin; Gabriel Pedernera
- Website: erucasativa.com

Eruca Sativa is an Argentine alternative rock band formed in 2007. It consists of Luisina "Lula" Bertoldi (guitar and vocals), Brenda Martin (bass and vocals) and Gabriel Pedernera (drums and vocals). They have released six studio albums and received several awards and nominations, including four Gardel Awards and six Latin Grammy Award nominations.

== Career ==
The band started in 2007, with the three members, Lula Bertoldi, Brenda Martin, and Gabriel Pedernera, having previous experiences in music, Pedernera had played in a jazz group with Martin while Martin had also been a part of a rock band with Bertoldi. The band's name Eruca Sativa roughly means "Wild Caterpillar" in latin and was chosen by the band to reflect their interest in the metaphorical significance of the metamorphosis that caterpillars go through. During 2007, they made their first performances in Córdoba, the city where the band was formed, and in 2008 they released an EP with songs like "Frío Cemento", "Lo Que No Ves No Es", "Foco" and "Eleanor Rigby" that later would be included in their debut album La Carne (2008), released the same year. The album had to be re-edited in 2010 after the original edition sold out.

On 20 August 2010, the band released their second album Es (2010), with collaborations with Argentine singers Titi Rivarola and David Lebón, the album was recorded at MLC Records and was presented at the bar Willie Dixon, one of the main venues of Rosario and was later performed at several cities in Argentina such as San Juan, Mendoza, La Plata and Buenos Aires. Their third album Blanco (2012) was released on 1 November 2012 through Sony Music, being their first album with the global music company, the album features a collaboration with Argentine singer Fito Páez and was recorded in MLC Records like their previous records, the project received a nomination for Best Rock Album at the 14th Latin Grammy Awards. In 2014, the band released their first live album Huellas Digitales (2014) on 21 October 2014, the album was recorded in two performances at the Teatro Opera in Buenos Aires in 1 and 2 August 2014 and consists of songs from their three previous albums.

After the pregnancies of Bertoldi and Martin, the band started to record their fifth album Barro y Fauna (2016) in Buenos Aires which was released on 25 November 2016, the project had several guest artists and producers such as Gustavo Santaolalla, Nicolás Sorín, Juan Pablo Rufino, Rodrigo Crespo, Pablo Tremsal, Aníbal Kerpel, Adrian Sosa and Tavo Cortes from Sig Ragga. At the Latin Grammy Awards, the singles "Nada Salvaje" and "Armas Gemelas" received nominations for Best Rock Song in 2016 and 2017 respectively while the album was nominated for Best Rock Album, their second nomination in that category. At the 19th Annual Gardel Awards, the album won Best Rock Group Album and Adrian Sosa won Production of the Year for his work in the album.

In 2017, to celebrate the ten years of the band they released an EP named EP Vivo consisting of four live performances recorded at the Luna Park in Buenos Aires, three songs from Barro y Fauna and a live version of "Amor Ausente" from Blanco. On 10 November 2019, their sixth album Seremos Primavera (2019), was released. For the project, the band received three nominations at the 21st Annual Latin Grammy Awards, Best Rock Album for Seremos Primavera, Best Rock Song for "Creo" and Best Alternative Song for "Caparazón".

In 2022, to celebrate their fifteenth anniversary, they released Dopelganga, an album composed of covers of song from various artists, both Argentine such as "Corazón Delator" by Soda Stereo and "Las Habladurías del Mundo" by Pescado Rabioso, and from other Latin American countries like "Afuera" by Mexican band Caifanes and "Ojalá" by Cuban musician Silvio Rodríguez. The album title makes reference to the concept of Doppelgänger, a look-alike or double of a person.

== Style and influences ==
Among their musical influences, the band mentions artists such as Les Claypool, Primus, Jimi Hendrix, Gustavo Cerati, System of a Down, Soda Stereo, Divididos, Rage Against the Machine and Red Hot Chili Peppers. During the recording of their third album, Blanco (2012), the band listened to the rock supergroup Them Crooked Vultures.

== Discography ==
- La Carne (2008)
- Es (2010)
- Blanco (2012)
- Huellas Digitales (2014)
- Barro y Fauna (2016)
- Seremos Primavera (2019)
- Dopelganga (2022)
- A tres días de la Tierra (2025)

== Awards and nominations ==
Award	Year	Category	Nominated work	Result	Ref.
Latin Grammy Awards	2013	Best Rock Album	Blanco	Nominated	
Latin Grammy Awards	2016	Best Rock Song	"Nada Salvaje"	Nominated	
Latin Grammy Awards	2017	Best Rock Song	"Armas Gemelas"	Nominated	
Latin Grammy Awards	2017	Best Rock Album	Barro y Fauna	Nominated	
Latin Grammy Awards	2020	Best Rock Album	Seremos Primavera	Nominated	
Latin Grammy Awards	2020	Best Rock Song	"Creo"	Nominated	
Latin Grammy Awards	2020	Best Alternative Song	"Caparazón"	Nominated	
Latin Grammy Awards	2022	Best Rock Song	"Día Mil"	Nominated	
Latin Grammy Awards	2023	Best Rock Album	Dopelganga	Nominated	
Latin Grammy Awards	2025	Best Rock Album	A Tres Días de la Tierra	Pending	
Latin Grammy Awards	2025	Best Rock Song	"Volarte"	Pending	
Premios Gardel	2011	Best New Rock Artist Album	Es	Nominated	
Premios Gardel	2013	Best Rock Group Album	Blanco	Nominated	
Premios Gardel	2015	Best Rock Group Album	Huellas Digitales	Nominated	
Premios Gardel	2015	Best DVD	Huellas Digitales	Nominated	
Premios Gardel	2016	Best Music Video	"Nada Salvaje"	Won	
Premios Gardel	2017	Song of the Year	"Armas Gemelas"	Nominated	
Premios Gardel	2017	Best Rock Group Album	Barro y Fauna	Won	
Premios Gardel	2019	Record of the Year	"Amor Ausente (en Vivo)" (con Abel Pintos)	Nominated	
Premios Gardel	2019	Collaboration of the Year	"Amor Ausente (en Vivo)" (con Abel Pintos)	Won	
Premios Gardel	2019	Best Music Video	"Amor Ausente (en Vivo)" (con Abel Pintos)	Nominated	
Premios Gardel	2020	Record of the Year	Seremos Primavera	Nominated	
Premios Gardel	2020	Album of the Year	Seremos Primavera	Nominated	
Premios Gardel	2020	Best Rock Group Album	Seremos Primavera	Won	
Premios Gardel	2023	Best Rock Group Album	Dopelganga	Won	
Premios Gardel	2023	Best Live Album	Seremos Primavera en Vivo en la Ballena Azul	Nominated	
Premios Gardel	2023	Best Long Music Video	Seremos Primavera en Vivo en la Ballena Azul	Won	
Premios Gardel	2024	Best Live Album	XV Años – En Vivo Estadio Obras	Nominated	
Premios Gardel	2024	Best Music Film	XV Años – En Vivo Estadio Obras	Nominated	
