= Latin Grammy Award for Best Rock Album =

- Awarded for: rock albums containing at least 51% of newly recorded material
- Country: United States
- Presented by: The Latin Recording Academy
- First award: 2000
- Currently held by: Fito Páez for Novela (2025)
- Website: latingrammy.com

The Latin Grammy Award for Best Rock Album is an honor presented annually by the Latin Academy of Recording Arts & Sciences at the Latin Grammy Awards, a ceremony that recognizes excellence and promotes a wider awareness of cultural diversity and contributions of Latin recording artists in the United States and internationally. According to the category description guide for the 2012 Latin Grammy Awards, the award is for vocal or instrumental rock albums containing at least 51 percent of newly recorded material. It is awarded to solo artists, duos or groups.

The accolade for Best Rock Album was first presented to the Mexican band Café Tacuba at the 1st Latin Grammy Awards in 2000 for their fourth studio album Revés/Yo Soy (1999). From 2001 until 2009, the category was not awarded and was instead split between Best Rock Solo Vocal Album and Best Rock Album by a Duo or Group with Vocal. Best Rock Album was reintroduced in 2010 at the 11th Annual Latin Grammy Awards.

Mexican group Molotov and Colombian band Diamante Eléctrico are the only acts to win this award more than once, with four and two wins, respectively. Uruguayan band NoTeVaGustar are the most nominated artist without a win, with four.

== Winners and nominees ==
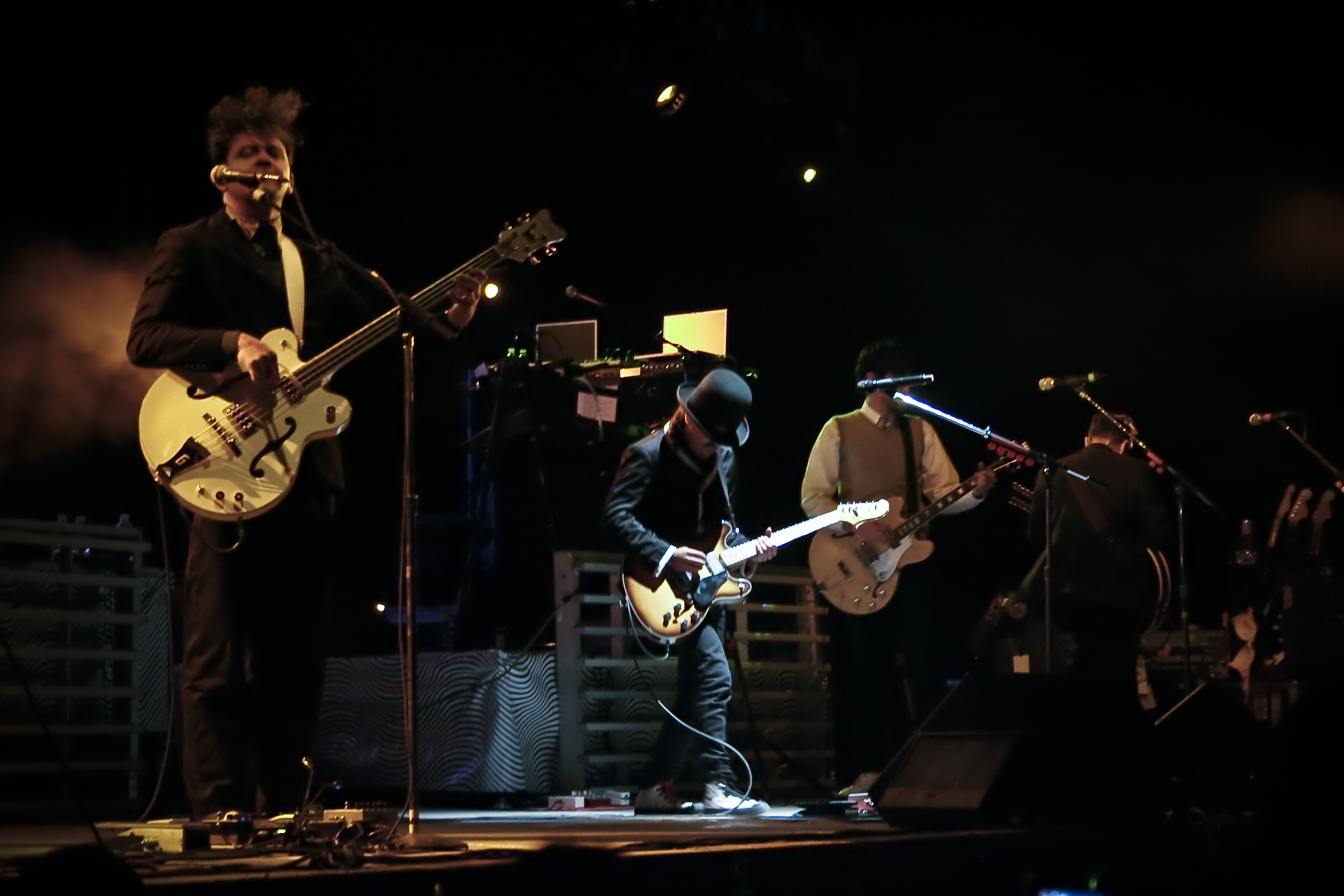
Mexican group Café Tacvba were the first winners of the award

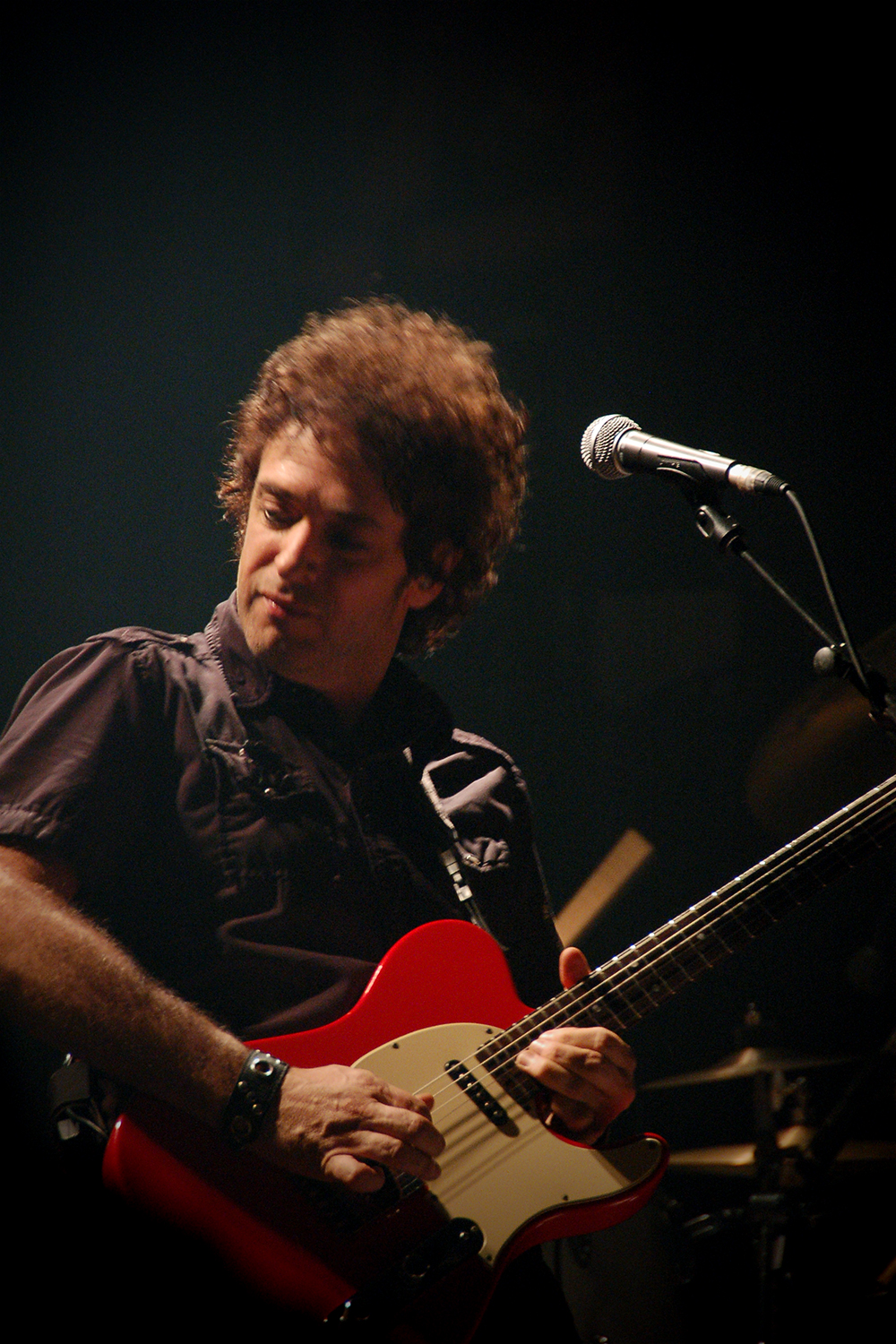
2010 winner Gustavo Cerati

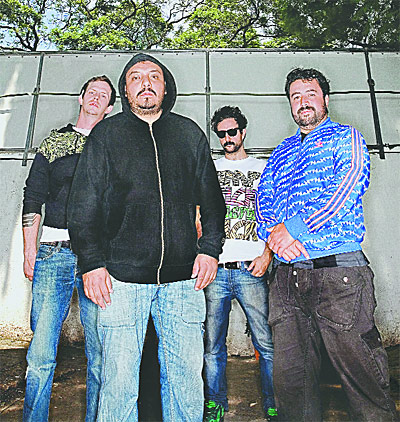
Four-time winners Molotov

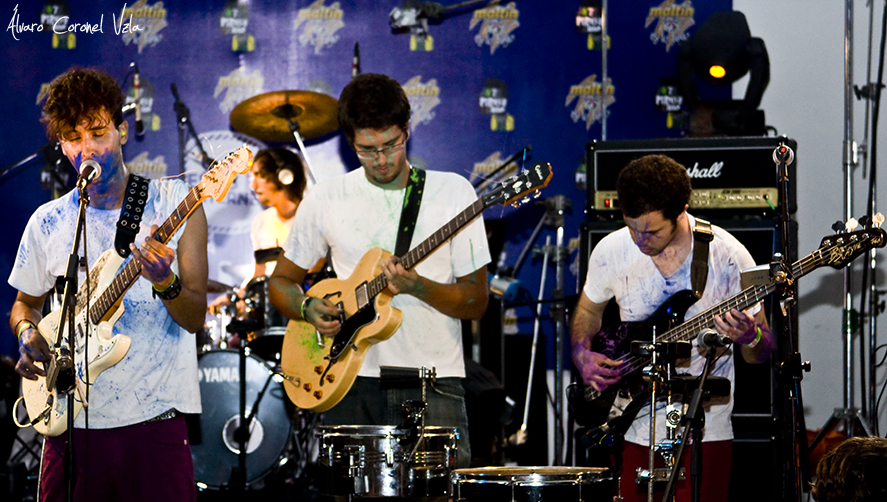
2013 winners La Vida Bohème

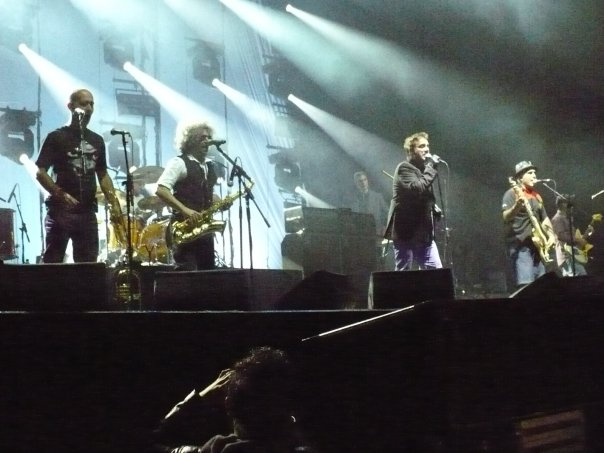
2016 winners Los Fabulosos Cadillacs

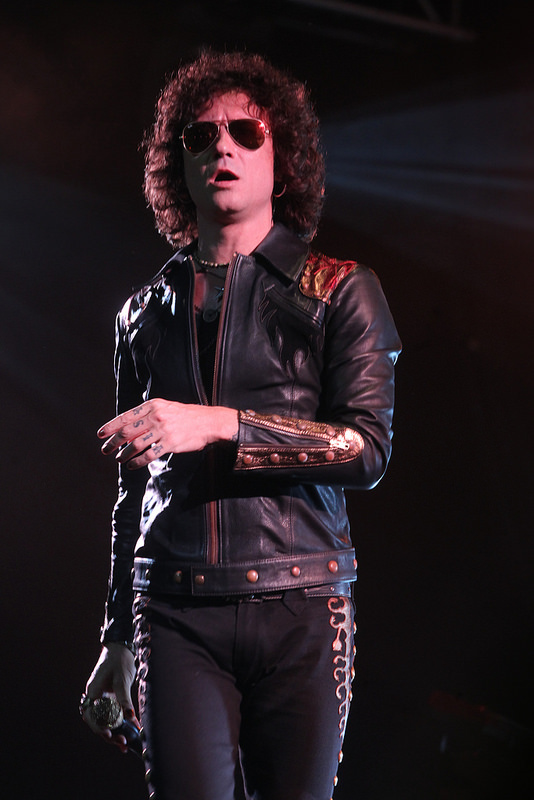
2018 winner Bunbury

Year	Performing artist(s)	Work	Nominees	Ref.
2000	Café Tacvba	Revés/Yo Soy	Jaguares – Bajo el Azul de Tu Misterio; Illya Kuryaki and the Valderramas – Leche; Fito Páez – Abre; La Ley – Uno	
2010	Gustavo Cerati	Fuerza Natural	Bohemia Suburbana – Bohemia Suburbana; Andrés Calamaro – On the Rock; Chetes – Hipnosis; Viniloversus – Si No Nos Mata	
2011	Maná	Drama y Luz	Don Tetto – Mienteme – Prometeme; Saúl Hernández – Remando; Jarabe de Palo – ¿Y Ahora Qué Hacemos?; La Vida Bohème – Nuestra; No Te Va Gustar – Por Lo Menos Hoy	
2012	Molotov	Desde Rusia con Amor	Los Mesoneros – Indeleble; No Te Va Gustar – Público; San Pascualito Rey – Valiente; Viniloversus – Cambié de Nombre	
2013	La Vida Bohème	Será	Eruca Sativa – Blanco; Los Bunkers – La Velocidad de la Luz; NoTeVaGustar – El Calor del Pleno Invierno; ~~Ska-P – 99%~~ (Declined)	
2014	Molotov	Agua Maldita	Enrique Bunbury – Palosanto; Doctor Krápula – Ama-Zonas; Don Tetto – Don Tetto; Luz Verde – El Final Del Mundo Vol. II: Nada Es Imposible	
2015	Diamante Eléctrico	B	Charliepapa – Y/O; Cuca – La Venganza De Cucamonga; La Gusana Ciega – Monarca; No Te Va Gustar – El Tiempo Otra Vez Avanza	
2016	Los Fabulosos Cadillacs	La Salvación de Solo y Juan	Andrea Álvarez – Y Lo Dejamos Venir; Marilina Bertoldi – Sexo Con Modelos; Massacre – Biblia Ovni; Spinetta – Los Amigo	
2017	Diamante Eléctrico	La Gran Oscilación	Daniel Cadena – Mutante; De La Tierra – II; Eruca Sativa – Barro y Fauna; Utopians – Todos Nuestros Átomos	
2018	Bunbury	Expectativas	Richard Coleman – F-A-C-I-L; Él Mató a un Policía Motorizado – La Síntesis O'Konor; Los Pixel – Ahora Lo Sabes Todo; No Te Va Gustar – Suenan Las Alarmas	
2019	Draco Rosa	Monte Sagrado	A.N.I.M.A.L – Una Razon Para Seguir; Arawato – Arawato; Carajo – Basado en hechos reales; Molotov – MTV Unplugged: El Desconecte	
2020	Molotov	¿Dónde Jugaran lxs Niñxs? (Desde el Palacio de los Deportes)	El Cuarteto de Nos – Jueves; Eruca Sativa – Seremos Primavera; Miguel Mateos – Uncotrecua; Vetamadre – Incomunicación	
2021	Vicentico	El Pozo Brillante	Bunbury – Curso de Levitación Intensivo; Caramelos de Cianuro – Control; Los Mesoneros – Los Mesoneros Live desde Pangea; No Te Va Gustar – Luz	
2022	Él Mató a un Policía Motorizado	Unas Vacaciones Raras	Marilina Bertoldi – Mojigata; Fito & Fitipaldis – Cada Vez Cadáver; La Gusana Ciega – 1021; Whiplash – RPDF	
2023	Molotov	Solo D' Lira	A.N.I.M.A.L. – Íntimo Extremo - 30 Años; Arde Bogotá – Cowboys de la A3; De La Tierra – De La Tierra III; Eruca Sativa – Dopelganga	
2024	Aterciopelados	El Dorado (En Vivo)	La Vida Bohème – Diáspora Live Vol.1; David Lebón – Herencia Lebón; Mägo de Oz – Alicia en el Metalverso; Viniloversus – Mi Mejor Enemigo	
2025	Fito Páez	Novela	A.N.I.M.A.L. – Legado; Marilina Bertoldi – Luna en Obras (En Vivo); Eruca Sativa – A Tres Días de la Tierra; Leiva – Gigante	

== Notes ==
^{^[I]} Each year is linked to the article about the Latin Grammy Awards held that year
^{^[II]} Showing only the nationality(ies) of the performing artist(s)
^{^[III]} Showing the name of the performer and the nominated album
