= L.H.O.N. =

L.H.O.N. (La Humanidad o Nosotros)

Studio album by Illya Kuryaki and the Valderramas
- Released: 8 April 2016
- Recorded: 2015
- Studio: Diosa Salvaje; Avesexua
- Genre: Rock, Funk
- Length: 52:09
- Label: Sony Music
- Producer: Dante Spinetta; Emmanuel Horvilleur

Illya Kuryaki and the Valderramas chronology
| Chances (2012) | L.H.O.N. (La Humanidad o Nosotros) (2016) |

Singles from L.H.O.N.
- 1. "Sigue" Released: 4 March 2016; 2. "Gallo Negro" Released: 1 April 2016

L.H.O.N., also called L.H.O.N. (La Humanidad o Nosotros) (English: L.H.O.N. (Humanity or Us)) is the eighth studio album by Argentine musical duo Illya Kuryaki and the Valderramas, released on April 8, 2016, through Sony Music. The album was produced by Dante Spinetta and Emmanuel Horvilleur, the two members of the duo, and features collaborations with Mexican singer Natalia Lafourcade and American singer Miguel.

At the 17th Annual Latin Grammy Awards, the album won Best Alternative Music Album, while the song "Gallo Negro" won Best Short Form Music Video. The album was also nominated for Best Latin Rock, Urban or Alternative Album at the 59th Annual Grammy Awards, the duo's second Grammy nomination. At the 19th Annual Gardel Awards, the album received the award for Best Alternative Rock/Pop Album, as well as a nomination for Production of the Year.

== Background ==
Following the release of Chances (2012) and Aplaudan la Luna (2014), the latter being their second live album, the duo talked about the possibility of releasing another album saying that "we are still closing the cycle but in reality we had thought of making Chances and Aplaudan and then we would see if we continue as solo artists or whatever", ultimately they decided to make a new album. The album was recorded during 2015 at the studios Diosa Salvaje and Avesexua with engineers Mariano Lopez and Saga Herrera, and mixed at After Hours Studio in Los Angeles by Rafa Sardina, the strings in the album were arranged by Claudio Cardone, played by the City of Prague Philharmonic Orchestra and recorded at Smecky Music Studios while the winds portions were arranged by Michael B. Nelson and recorded at Bone 2 B Wild Studio in Minneapolis.

About the composition and themes of the album, the duo said that "the idea was to translate into recording techniques what we felt, which was very visceral, we needed that humanity outside humanity, because there are human things that are not good and there are animal things that are better, it was almost like turning into animals in some type of way, tribal-like", themes such as pleasure, faith, love, tribes and shamanism run through the album in songs like "Aleluya", about the search for a new faith, "Diciembre" ("December"), about the end of a relationship, and "El Árbol Bajo el Agua" ("The Tree Under the Water"), about something that should not be in a certain place anymore but still is, resisting, like for example, love.

In early 2016, the duo teased the album via a Facebook stream, the video reached over 23k views in one hour. On 18 March 2016, the duo performed at Lollapalooza Argentina, where they performed four songs from the album alongside other songs from their discography, the songs were the two singles "Sigue" and "Gallo Negro", as well as "Ritmo Mezcal" and "Estrella Fugaz", the latter with a guest appearance of Miguel, who features in the song.

== Singles ==
The album's first single "Sigue" was released on 4 March 2016. The lyric video for the song "Gallo Negro" was intended to be released on 28 February 2016, but ultimately it was on 12 February, the video achieved a million views in YouTube after five days of being uploaded to the platform, the official music video of the song was released on 1 March.

== Critical reception ==
Professional ratings
Review scores
| Source | Rating |
|---|---|
| AllMusic | 3.5/5 stars |

Mariano Prunes from AllMusic gave the album three and a half stars out of five, writing that while the tracks are "wildly eclectic", the album "does not fare so well as an Illya Kuryaki record, it is neither bizarre nor funny enough, it lacks a truly great I.K.V. hit, and it is drowned by the weight of its ballads", he also commented that "with better sequencing and a couple fewer ballads, L.H.O.N. would have been a much better album than Chances, because its several highlights ("Aleluya," "Gallo Negro," "Los Ángeles," "Ritmo Mezcal") are better than anything on that previous outing".

== Track listing ==
All tracks were written and produced by Spinetta and Horvilleur, except when noted.

L.H.O.N.
| No. | Title | Writer(s) | Length |
|---|---|---|---|
| 1. | "Aleluya" | | 4:29 |
| 2. | "Gallo Negro" | | 3:53 |
| 3. | "Hombre Libre" | | 3:42 |
| 4. | "Sigue" | | 4:04 |
| 5. | "Ey Dios" (featuring Natalia Lafourcade) | | 4:03 |
| 6. | "Los Angeles" | | 4:10 |
| 7. | "Estrella Fugaz" (featuring Miguel) | | 3:44 |
| 8. | "Ritmo Mezcal" | | 3:57 |
| 9. | "África" | | 3:30 |
| 10. | "Espantapájaros" | | 4:34 |
| 11. | "Diciembre" | Horvilleur | 5:33 |
| 12. | "El Árbol Bajo el Agua" | Spinetta | 2:35 |
| 13. | "Mi Futuro" | | 3:41 |
| Total length: | | | 52:09 |
