= 19th Annual Premios Gardel =

2017 Argentine music awards ceremony

- Date: June 6, 2017
- Location: Gran Rex Theatre, Buenos Aires, Argentina
- Hosted by: Lalo Mir; Maju Lozano

Highlights
- Most awards: Abel Pintos (3)
- Most nominations: Abel Pintos (5)

Television/radio coverage
- Network: TN

The 19th Annual Premios Gardel ceremony were held on June 6, 2017. The TN network broadcast the show live from the Gran Rex Theatre in Buenos Aires. The ceremony recognizes the best recordings, compositions, and artists of the eligibility year, which runs from January 1, 2016 to January 31, 2016.

Lalo Mir and Maju Lozano hosted the ceremony. The "pre-telecast" ceremony was held on the same day at the Opera Allianz Theatre prior to the main event and was hosted by Gabriela Radice.

The nominations were announced on May 9, 2017 at the Néstor Kirchner Cultural Centre. Abel Pintos acquired the most nominations with five, while Carajo, Eruca Sativa and Illya Kuryaki and the Valderramas followed with three nominations each. Pintos was the biggest winner of the night with three trophies, including Best Male Pop Album the Golden Gardel Award for Album of the Year for 11, and Song of the Year for "Cómo Te Extraño". Eruca Sativa, Carajo and Babasónicos followed with two trophies each. The Solidarity Gardel Award went to León Gieco, for the video of his song "La memoria", which pays tribute to the victims at the AMIA bombing attack.

== Background ==
The 2017 edition of the Gardel Awards received 1,500 applications, marking a 23% of increase regarding the 2016 edition, even though Universal, one of the major record companies, declined to submit its artists for award consideration. The genre that received the most nominations was rock, followed by folklore and pop.

== Performers ==
Performers adapted from Clarín.com.

Artist(s)	Song(s)
Lalo Mir; Raúl Lavié; Alejandro Lerner; Ariel Ardit; Abel Pintos; Marcela Morelo; Gladys; Mono; Kevin Johansen	"El Día Que Me Quieras"
Eruca Sativa; Octafonic	"Armas Gemelas"
Miranda! Juanchi Baleirón; Palito Ortega	Tribute to Cacho Castaña "Ojalá que no puedas" "Cara de tramposo" "La vuelta del matador" "Quieren matar al ladrón" "La reina de la bailanta"
Daniel Melingo	"En un bosque de la China"
Elena Roger; Escalandrum	"Preludio para el año 3001"
Lali	"Ego" "Boomerang" "Soy"
Hernán Jacinto; Joaquín Vitola	In Memoriam "Rezo por vos"
Jairo; Bruno Arias; Nahuel Pennisi	Tribute to Horacio Guarany
El Polaco	"Sola Otra Vez"
Los Palmeras	"Bombón asesino"

== Nominees and winners ==
Nominees were taken from the Gardel Awards website. Winners are listed in bold.

=== General ===
Album of the Year

- **11 – Abel Pintos**
- 3001 Proyecto Piazzolla – Elena Roger & Escalandrum
- Naranja persa – Ciro y los Persas

Song of the Year

- **"Cómo Te Extraño" – Abel Pintos**
- "La noche" – Andrés Calamaro
- "Armas gemelas" – Eruca Sativa
- "Soy" – Lali
- "La Tormenta" – Los Fabulosos Cadillacs

Best Singer-Songwriter Album

- **Auténtico – Alejandro Lerner**
- César Isella 60 - Todas las voces todas – César Isella
- Canta Mateo y Darnauchans – Fernando Cabrera
- Perdido por Perdido – Iván Noble
- Mis Américas, Vol. 1/2 – Kevin Johansen + The Nada

=== Pop ===
Best Female Pop Album

- **Espinas & Pétalos – Marcela Morelo**
- Piel – Déborah De Corral
- Soy – Lali

Best Male Pop Album

- **11 – Abel Pintos**
- Vida Lejana – Benjamín Amadeo
- Last Call – Maxi Trusso

Best Pop Group Album

- **Las antenas – Estelares**
- Era Es Será – Barco
- Ojos tremendos – Los Tipitos

Best New Pop Artist Album

- **Vida Lejana – Benjamín Amadeo**
- Antihéroe – Juanjo Ceccón
- Continental – Sullivan

=== Rock ===
Best Female Rock Album

- **Sexo Con Modelos – Marilina Bertoldi**
- Se vuelve cada día más loca por amor al blues – Celeste Carballo
- Señales – Patricia Sosa

Best Male Rock Album

- **Encuentro Supremo – David Lebón**
- Naranja persa – Ciro y los Persas
- Contraluz – Pedro Aznar

Best Rock Group Album

- **Barro y Fauna – Eruca Sativa**
- La Salvación de Solo y Juan – Los Fabulosos Cadillacs
- Vivo en Red House – Manal

Best New Rock Artist Album

- **Al Borde del Filo – Las Diferencias**
- Hoy – Mel Cruz
- Dedos Negros – Sol Bassa

Best Hard Rock/Punk Album

- **Hoy Como Ayer – Carajo**
- Vivo en Red House – A.N.I.M.A.L.
- 1000 Vidas – Coverheads

=== Tango ===
Best Female Tango Album

- **En Vivo en el Teatro Coliseo – Lidia Borda**
- Memorias de un bandoneón – Carla Algeri
- Tango – Marián Farías Gómez

Best Male Tango Album

- **Gardel Sinfónico – Ariel Ardit & Filarmónica de Medellín**
- Secretos conocidos – Aquiles Roggero
- Misteriosa Buenos Aires – Osvaldo Piro y su Orquesta

Best New Tango Artist Album

- **Así – Jorge Vázquez**
- Tango Energy – Giannina Giunta
- La Martino Orquesta Típica – La Martino Orquesta Típica

=== Tropical ===
Best Female Tropical Album

- **Cosecharás tu siembra – Gladys, la Bomba Tucumana**
- Viva – Ángela Leiva
- No Ha Sido Fácil – Eugenia Quevedo

Best Male Tropical Album

- **Sola Otra Bez – El Polaco**
- Y Amigos – Daniel Cardozo
- Cumbia Peposa – El Pepo

Best Tropical Group Album

- **Tiempo de bailar – Los Palmeras**
- Todo Comenzó Bailando – Márama
- Una cerveza – Ráfaga

Best New Tropical Artist Album

- **No Ha Sido Fácil – Eugenia Quevedo**
- La Dama del Acordeón – Azul
- Sin Fronteras – Puli Moreno

=== Folk ===
Best Female Folklore Album

- **Soledad 20 Años – Soledad**
- Atar – Laura Ros
- Imposible – Liliana Herrero

Best Male Folklore Album

- **El disco de oro. Folklore de 1940 – Vitillo Ábalos**
- El Derecho De Vivir En paz – Bruno Arias
- De Criollo a Criollo, Homenaje a Don Ata (Mi Versión) – Chaqueño Palavecino

Best Folklore Group Album

- **Solo Luz, Tributo a Raúl Carnota – Luna Monti y Juan Quintero**
- Los Manseros Santiagueños en el Luna Park – Los Manseros Santiagueños
- 30 Años – Los Nocheros

=== Cuarteto ===
Best Cuarteto Album

- **No Me Pidan Que Baje el Volumen – Ulises Bueno**
- Soy un tipo de la noche – La Mona Jiménez
- La gente me quiere – Jean Carlos

Best Cuarteto Group Album

- **22 Años – La Barra**
- Una Buena Costumbre – La Barra
- Raza Única – Tru-la-lá

=== Alternative ===
Best Alternative Tango Album

- **Anda – Melingo**
- La Pampa grande – La Chicana
- Desenchufado – Tanghetto

Best Alternative Folklore Album

- **Otras Músicas – Chango Spasiuk**
- Ayer es siempre – Juan Falú y Marcelo Moguilevsky
- Gira – Los Huayra

Best Alternative Rock/Pop Album

- **L.H.O.N. – Illya Kuryaki and the Valderramas**
- Mini Buda – Octafonic
- La Promesa de Thamar – Sig Ragga

=== Electronic ===
Best Electronic Music Album

- **Opera Galaxy – Shoot the Radio**
- DJ Sings The Blues – Dr. Trincado
- Circus – Mistol Team
- We Are Landscapes – Moon Pollen

=== Romantic/Melodic ===
Best Romantic/Melodic Album

- **Clásico – Sergio Denis**
- Aniversario – Jorge Rojas
- Amántico – Mike Amigorena

=== Music for Visual Media ===
Best Cinema/Television Soundtrack Album

- **Otras Músicas – Chango Spasiuk**
- Bandas de Sonido II – Diego Mizrahi
- Gilda, No Me Arrepiento de Este Amor – Natalia Oreiro

=== Reggae/Urban ===
Best Reggae/Urban Album

- **Soundamérica – Los Pericos**
- 10 años – Dread Mar I
- Stay Rude! – Hugo Lobo
- Alas canciones – Los Cafres

=== Chamamé ===
Best Chamamé Album

- **Puertos – Hernán Crespo**
- En tiempo de Chamamé – Gabriel Cocomarola
- Ídolos – Juancito Güenaga y su conjunto

=== Jazz ===
Best Jazz Album

- **Mute – Fernández 4**
- Música anfibia – Abel Rogantini
- Woody & Jazz – Manuel Fraga Trío

=== Classical ===
Best Classical Album

- **Live – Sol Gabetta**
- Ginastera - Prokofiev - Janácek, Manos a las Obras II – Elías Gurevich and Haydée Schvartz
- Senanes/Cuerdas Camerata Bariloche and Orquesta Cuerda

Best Instrumental Tango Orchestra Album

- **Timba – Diego Schissi Quinteto**
- 13 – Rodolfo Mederos
- Aeropuerto París – Walter Ríos

=== World Music ===
Best Instrumental/Fusion/World Music Album

- **El Tren - Solo Guitarra – Luis Salinas**
- Qhapaq Ñan – Gustavo Santaolalla
- Punto de fuga – Nicolás Guerschberg

=== Children ===
Best Children's Album

- **Churo! – Mariana Baraj**
- Lo que Llevas en tu Corazón – Diego Topa and others
- Piñón en Familia – Piñón Fijo with Solcito Fijo and Jere Fijo

=== Historical ===
Best Catalog Collection

- **Héctor Stamponi interpreta su música al piano – Héctor Stamponi**
- Fundamentales (81-87) "¿Y ahora qué pasa eh?" – Los Violadores
- Cinco Décadas de Rock Argentino: Primera Década (1966-1976) – Various Artists

=== Recording Engineering ===
Recording Engineering

- **Hoy Como Ayer – Carajo**
  - **Engineer: Alejandro Vazquez**
- 11 – Abel Pintos
  - Engineers: Bori Alarcón – Iván Chapo – Antonio Pérez – Oskar Winberg – Edward Hartwell and Ted Jensen
- Brindando por Nada – Las Pelotas
  - Engineers: Mariano Bilinkis – Uriel Mackren and Daniel Ovie

=== Producer ===
Production of the Year

- **Barro y Fauna – Eruca Sativa**
  - **Producer: Adrian Sosa**
- 11 – Abel Pintos
  - Producers: Martin Terefe, Leiva, Abel Pintos and Ariel Pintos
- L.H.O.N. – Illya Kuryaki and the Valderramas
  - Producers: Dante Spinetta and Emmanuel Horvilleur

=== Music Video/Film ===
Best DVD

- **Desde Adentro - Impuesto de Fe – Babasónicos**
- La Beriso (Estadio Único) – La Beriso
- Vivo en Red House – Manal

Best Music Video

- **"En un bosque de la China" – Daniel Melingo**
- "Pájaro Cantor"" – Abel Pintos
- "Gallo Negro" – Illya Kuryaki and the Valderramas

=== Design ===
Best Cover Design

- **Impuesto de Fe – Babasónicos**
  - **Designer: Alejandro Ros**
- 11 – Abel Pintos
  - Designer: Omar Souto
- Hoy Como Ayer – Carajo
  - Designer: Matias Marano
- El Lapsus del Jinete Ciego – Gabo Ferro
  - Designer: Laura Varsky

=== Archival Concept ===
Best Archival Concept Album

- **Jobim" – Silvina Garré and Litto Nebbia**
  - **Executive producer: Litto Nebia**
- Nuevas cartas al rey de la cabina y Anita, mi amor – Luis Pescetti and Juan Quintero
  - Executive producer: Luis Pescetti
- Tiempo reflejado - Un homenaje a Manolo Juárez – Various Artists
  - Executive producers: Mora Juárez and Lito Vitale

== Multiple nominations and awards ==
The following received multiple nominations:

Five:

- Abel Pintos

Three:

- Carajo
- Eruca Sativa
- Illya Kuryaki and the Valderramas

Two

- Benjamín Amadeo
- Chango Spasiuk
- Ciro y los Persas
- Daniel Melingo
- Eugenia Quevedo
- Juan Quintero
- La Barra
- Lali
- Los Fabulosos Cadillacs
- Manal
