= Chaco (album) =

Studio album by Illya Kuryaki and the Valderramas
- Released: 1995
- Recorded: January–June, 1995
- Genre: Rock
- Length: 58:41
- Label: Gigoló Productions
- Producer: Mariano López, Carlos Rufino

Illya Kuryaki and the Valderramas chronology
Horno Para Calentar Los Mares (1993)	Chaco (1995)	Versus (1997)

Singles from Chaco
- 1. "Abarajame"; 2. "Jaguar House"; 3. "Remisero"; 4. "Abismo"; 5. "Húmeda"

Professional ratings
Review scores
Source	Rating
AllMusic	3.5/5 stars

Chaco is the third studio album by the Argentine duo Illya Kuryaki and the Valderramas, released in 1995 by Gigolo Productions. It was produced by Mariano Lopez Machi, former bassist of Invisible. The disc includes sixteen tracks that were mastered in New York by Ted Jensen (regular contributor to Madonna). Accompanied by Fernando Samalea (drums), Gustavo Spinetta (percussion), Gabriel Albizuri (guitar) and Fernando Nale (bass), the musicians presented the single "Abarajame". The title of the album is called under a northern Argentinian province, statistically the poorest one in that country.

== Release and reception ==
«The disc offers a new mind in which there is no place for discrimination or oppression, hence the name : this is a province where Indians still inhabit this land.» (Télam, 26/10/95).

The album has sold about 250,000 copies since its release. Crosses of hardcore rap, hip-hop and progressive rock, this album had five singles: "Abarajame", "Jaguar House", "Remisero", and two ballads that Dante Spinetta and Emmanuel Horvilleur sang separately: "Húmeda" and "Abismo", respectively. In 2007, the Argentine edition of Rolling Stone ranked it 38th on its list of "The 100 Greatest Albums of National Rock". They were recognized as Best Group, Best Album and Best Video ("Abarajame") for surveys of supplements "Yes" from Clarín and "No" from Página/12.

== Track listing ==
- All songs written by Illya Kuryaki and the Valderramas.

No.	Title	Length
1.	"Chaco"	4:10
2.	"Abarajame"	4:17
3.	"Jaguar House"	3:46
4.	"Hermoza From Heaven"	4:27
5.	"Ipanema"	0:28
6.	"Remisero"	3:23
7.	"Abismo"	4:48
8.	"Húmeda"	3:54
9.	"Sirena"	0:34
10.	"No Es Tu Sombra"	4:23
11.	"En El Reino"	3:12
12.	"Hermana Sista"	6:12
13.	"Jalea"	4:43
14.	"Mitad de la Canción del Caballo Violeta"	2:44
15.	"Hombre Blanco"	4:18
16.	"Nacimiento"	3:12
