= Gabba Gabba Hey =

Catchphrase associated with the punk rock band the Ramones

"Gabba Gabba Hey" is a catchphrase associated with the American punk rock band the Ramones. The phrase is included in the song "Pinhead" (1977), which contains the lyrics: "Gabba gabba, we accept you, we accept you, one of us." The song ends with: "Gabba gabba hey, gabba gabba hey!..."

== History ==
The phrase comes from a scene in the 1932 motion picture Freaks, in which the title characters chant the line "Gooble, gobble, we accept her, we accept her, one of us, one of us!" The Ramones saw Freaks at an art house cinema on a rare day off when an outdoor event they were to perform at was canceled due to bad weather. One of Freaks' main characters is a microcephalic, or "pinhead", named Schlitzie.

In Allan Arkush's film, Rock 'n' Roll High School, during a Ramones concert at The Roxy, a character in a Schlitzie mask appears on stage carrying a large sign with the phrase "Gabba Gabba Hey". Afterwards, the band wanted to relive the experience, and a roadie, usually Mitch "Bubbles" Keller, would appear on stage in a Pinhead mask, hand the sign to Joey Ramone, and perform a dance on stage, colloquially referred to as the "jerk dance". In later years, Keller updated the "Pinhead" with a brightly colored, mismatched, polka-dotted dress sewn together for him by an employee of the Ritz.

Sometimes celebrity guests (such as Eddie Vedder) would don the mask and/or costume on stage. The Pinhead would usually leave after the song was finished, but sometimes would appear for promotional purposes, such as live performances on television or music videos. To this day, the Pinhead, along with the Ramones Presidential Seal is a symbol of the band and appears on many items of Ramones merchandising.

In 1991, a Ramones tribute album called Gabba Gabba Hey: A Tribute to the Ramones was released.

== In other media ==
The title of children's show Yo Gabba Gabba!, which debuted in 2007, pays homage to "Gabba Gabba Hey".

In the 1995 PC game Descent, typing the phrase "gabbagabbahey" on the keyboard during gameplay unlocks the cheat mode, after which other cheat codes (infinite weapons, infinite health, et cetera) could be entered. In the game's sequel, Descent II, typing "gabbagabbahey" lowers a player's health and shield to 1%. In both games, typing the cheat code results in the computer announcer's voice admonishing the player with: "Cheater!" The B key by default drops a proximity mine that would shortly arm and explode if the player is still nearby, so use of the code without remapping the controls is perilous.

The phrase also appears in the Swedish musician Håkan Hellström's 2023 album "Poetiska Försök" in the song "Små bäckar, stora floder" in the seventh verse.

In The Simpsons episode "El Viaje Misterioso de Nuestro Jomer (The Mysterious Voyage of Homer)", when Homer Simpson starts hallucinating from eating Guatemalan insanity peppers, he imagines Ned Flanders suddenly talking rapidly, with "Gabba Gabba Hey" being the only comprehensible words.

The Venezuelan rock band La Vida Bohème's first single, "Radio Capital" (released in 2010), includes "Gabba Gabba Hey" as a repetitive chant.

At the end of the Blink-182 Ramones-themed music video for their October 2023 single "Dance with Me", bassist and vocalist Mark Hoppus signs off with the catchphrase.
