= Leche (Illya Kuryaki and the Valderramas album) =

Studio album by Illya Kuryaki and the Valderramas
- Released: 10 August 1999
- Recorded: 1999
- Studio: Circo Beat; Diosa Salvaje
- Genre: Rock; Hip Hop; Funk
- Length: 56:13
- Label: Universal Music Argentina
- Producer: Dante Spinetta; Emmanuel Horvilleur

Illya Kuryaki and the Valderramas chronology
Versus (1997)	Leche (1999)	Kuryakistan (2001)

Singles from Leche
- 1. "Coolo" Released: 1999; 2. "Jennifer del Estero" Released: 1999

Leche (English: Milk) is the fifth studio album by Argentine musical duo Illya Kuryaki and the Valderramas, released on 10 August 1999, through Universal Music Argentina. The album was produced by Dante Spinetta and Emmanuel Horvilleur, the two members of the duo, with production from Nico Cota and Sergio Verdinelli in some tracks, and features Parliament-Funkadelic bass player Bootsy Collins in the last track of the album.

At the 1st Annual Latin Grammy Awards, the album was nominated for Best Rock Album.

== Background ==
The album was recorded both in Argentina, at studios Circo Beat and Diosa Salvaje, and in United States, where the album was finished, it was produced by the duo with Nico Cota and Sergio Verdinelli having production credits on the tracks "Lo Que Nos Mata" and "Coolo", respectively, the album also features an appearance of Parliament-Funkadelic bass player Bootsy Collins on the track "DJ Droga". The album spawned the singles "Coolo" and "Jennifer del Estero", the former became one of the most successful songs by the duo, the music video for "Coolo" features Nelson de la Rosa, a Dominican actor who was one of the shortest men on earth during his life.

References to sex appear throughout the album both in the lyrics of the songs as well as its names, "Guerrilla Sexua" ("Sexual Guerrilla") features the lines "yo solo pretendo probarla, meter mi sexo en su frutilla me alcanza" ("I just want to taste her, to put my sex in her strawberry is enough") while the name for the song "Coolo" is a misspelt way to say "culo" ("ass" or "butt" in Spanish). In comparison to their previous album, Versus (1997), the album is more upbeat and features a wider mix of genres, Spinetta has said that "we needed to make an album like Leche to play live again, Versus was very slow and we wanted to play and break everything, we made Leche by rehearsing with the band, more than half of the lyrics were written in the studio, we wanted the music to permeate the lyrics, it was not like Versus which had a lyrical plan, Leche has its lyrics but its more physical". Following the release of the album the duo said that "it is without a doubt our best album and it happened naturally because we came from slower songs and we wanted to dance so we let ourselves mix rap with funk and soul".

The album faced censorship initially due to its cover art, which shows the bare breasts of a woman with the nipples barely cropped by the limits of the picture. The song "Coolo" was also censored, mainly due to mentioning the word "culo" several times. More recently, the song "Jennifer del Estero" has sparked controversy due to its lyrics mentioning a "girl of fifteen wet years", according to the duo the song never made actual references them having relationships with teenage girls but instead it was written with the purpose of letting their young audience to identify with the song, nevertheless, the duo has modified the lyrics during performances changing the fifteen with nineteen.

To promote the album the duo embarked on a U.S. tour, titled Watcha, Tour!, alongside other Latin American artists such as Molotov, Puya and Control Machete, among others. In Buenos Aires, Argentina, the duo decided to put up posters in the streets saying "a mover el culo, se acaba la era" ("shake your butt, the era is ending"), which makes references to the lyrics of the song "Coolo" and the end of the 20th century.

== Critical reception ==
Professional ratings
Review scores
Source	Rating
AllMusic	4/5 stars

Heather Phares from AllMusic gave the album four out of five stars, writing that "Leche is another diverse and entertaining release from one of Argentina's most inventive bands", she also wrote that the album was another example of the duo's fusion of rock and rap, writing that "their psychedelic side emerges on tracks like "DJ Droga" and "Apocalipsis Wow!" while "Latin Geisha," "Robot," and "Guerrilla Sexual" demonstrate the fluidity of their rapping".

== Track listing ==
All tracks were written and produced by Illya Kuryaki and the Valderramas (Dante Spinetta and Emmanuel Horvilleur).

Leche track listing
No.	Title	Writer(s)	Producer(s)	Length
1.	"Latin Geisha"			3:49
2.	"Coolo"		Dante Spinetta; Emmanuel Horvilleur; Sergio Verdinelli	4:07
3.	"Apocalipsis Wow!"			4:45
4.	"Wacho"			4:09
5.	"Lo Que Nos Mata"		Spinetta; Horvilleur; Nico Cota	5:37
6.	"Jennifer del Estero"			4:55
7.	"¿De Qué Me Hablás?"			5:26
8.	"Robot"			2:10
9.	"Hecho Mierda"	Spinetta; Horvilleur; Gustavo Spinetta		3:39
10.	"Guerrilla Sexua"			4:40
11.	"Joya + Guinga + Fuego"			3:13
12.	"Nadie Más"			4:32
13.	"DJ Droga"	Spinetta; Horvilleur; Bootsy Collins		5:05
Total length:				56:13

== Credits ==
=== Illya Kuryaki and the Valderramas ===
- Dante Spinetta – vocals, composition, arrangements, production, bass, bass Programming, guitar, loop, synthesizer, synthesizer bass, vocoder
- Emmanuel Horvilleur – vocals, composition, arrangements, production, bass, clavinet, percussion, synthesizer, vibraslap, vurlitzer

=== Musicians ===
- Sergio Verdinelli – production (track 2), cowbell, drums, timbales
- Nico Cota – production (track 5), bongos, bottle, clavinet, congas, cowbell, finger cymbals, guiro, palms, shaker, tabla, timbales
- Claudio Cardone – clavichord, effects, fender rhodes, moog synthesizer, hammond organ, piano, programming, synthesizer, vocoder

=== Technical ===
- Thom Russo – engineer, mixing
- Mariano López – engineer
- José Luis Miceli – executive producer
- Mariano Melli – studio assistant
- Aníbal Barrios – studio assistant
- Javier Galarza – studio assistant
- Mario Samper – studio assistant
- Andrés Paster – photography
- Rocca Cherniavsky – photography
- Andrés Fogwill – art coordinator
- Alejandro Ros – graphic design
