= La Vida Bohème =

Venezuelan rock band

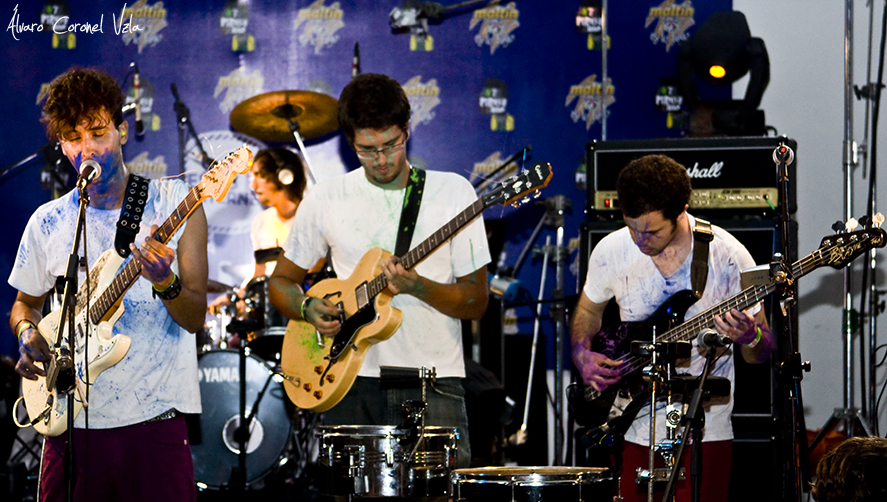
- Live in 2009, left to right: D'Arthenay, Ayala (background), de Sousa, Pérez Medina

Background information
- Origin: Caracas, Venezuela
- Genres: Post-punk revival; dance-punk; indie rock; synth-rock; garage rock
- Years active: 2006–present
- Labels: All of the Above; Nacional
- Members: Henry D'Arthenay; Sebastián Ayala; Daniel Briceño
- Past members: Rafael Pérez Medina; Moises Enghelberg; Hector Tosta; Daniel de Sousa
- Website: lavidaboheme.com

La Vida Bohème is a rock band from Caracas, Venezuela, formed by Rafael Perez, Daniel De Sousa, Sebastian Ayala, and Henry D'Arthenay in late 2006 and mid-2007. The band takes influence from late '80s punk, disco, funk, electronic music, jazz, salsa, reggae and dance music. Their first recording is a self-titled EP that includes three songs (Aprendiendo.a.apagar.un.cigarro.con.los.pies, Luz and I.p.o.s.t.e.l.) La Vida Bohème is Henry D’Arthenay (guitar and lead singer), Daniel Briceño (bass guitar and vocals), Daniel de Sousa (guitar and vocals), and Sebastián Ayala (drummer and vocals). In 2008, they won the Festival Nuevas Bandas (New Bands Festival of Venezuela).

They released Nuestra, their 12-track debut album, in February 2010. The album was available for free download for a limited time, followed by a limited-edition CD pressing in the summer of 2010. The album has been licensed by Nacional Records for release in North America in 2011. Their first single was "Radio Capital", a danceable tune anchored by a repetitive chant of "Gabba Gabba Hey", referencing The Ramones. They were widely acclaimed for their debut album, earning them a Grammy nomination and two Latin Grammy wins. Their song "Buen Salvaje" is featured in the EA Sports game FIFA 12, "Radio Capital" is featured in Grand Theft Auto V, and "Manos Arriba" is featured in FIFA 21.

== History ==
The band's name was chosen by the first drummer while they practiced in downtown Caracas. It has no particular origin, though it is said they chose it from Giacomo Puccini's opera La bohème.

During 2007 they performed their music through the local night life and festivals. Their first EP, La Vida Bohème EP, with three songs, is available for download on the netlabel Fanzinatra.

Their debut album, Nuestra, was recorded and produced in Venezuela by Rudy Pagliuca (guitarist of Malanga) and mixed by Leonel Carmona, and mastered in Argentina by Andrés Mayo. It was one of the first albums in Venezuela to be released on free download, through the record company All of the Above. A limited-edition CD was released in the summer of 2010 and sold directly by the band at shows or other events.

The band has signed a licensing deal with Nacional Records for distribution in the US, Canada and Mexico.

The band also produced videos for two of the album's singles: "Radio Capital", which was released in December 2009, and "Danz!", released in August 2010. In November 2010, YouTube censored the video for "Danz!", citing the video's inclusion of nudity.

In September 2011, the band received two Latin Grammy nominations from Latin Recording Academy. Nuestra was nominated for Best Rock Album and "Radio Capital" was nominated for Best Rock Song. In November 2011, Nuestra was nominated for a Grammy Award for Best Latin Pop, Rock or Urban Album.

They finished recording their second studio album, Será, in February 2013; it was released on May 14. In November 2013, La Vida Bohème won their first Latin Grammy Award for Best Rock Album. They were named Best Rock Artist at the 2014 Pepsi Venezuela Music Awards.

Their third album, La Lucha, produced by Eduardo Cabra Martínez (Visitante Calle 13) and recorded in Puerto Rico, was released in March 2017. La Lucha marks the end of the band's album trilogy; "Nuestra Será La Lucha" roughly translates to "Ours Will Be The Fight".

In 2020 they came out with their first single since La Lucha, “Último Round”. A few months later, their song “Acción (o Decreto de Guerra a Muerte a los Traidores del Rock Latinoamericano)” came out with a completely different sound to it; some months later came “¡Plis, Plis, Plis!” and “Miami S&M”. The last song of the year was called “Control” and wrapped up their 2020 EP, Fr€€$$r. This EP is characterised by having videos for every one of its songs.

== Members ==
- Henry D'Arthenay (guitar, vocals, electronics) (2006–present)
- Sebastián Ayala (drummer, backing vocals, programming) (2007–present)
- Daniel "Mono" Briceño (bass guitar, synthesizer, backing vocals) (2017–present)

== Past members ==
- Daniel de Sousa (guitar, cowbell, backing vocals, synthesizer) (2006–2020)
- Rafael Pérez Medina (bass guitar, backing vocals) (2006–2017)
- Moises Enghelberg (drummer) (2006)

== Discography ==
=== Studio albums ===
- Nuestra (2010)
- Será (2013)
- La Lucha (2017)
- Caribe Caribe (2023)
- Tierra de Nadie (2025)

=== EPs ===
- La Vida Bohème (2007)
- Tiempo Compartido (2020)
- FR€€$$R (2020)
- TITULARES (2022)

== Awards and nominations ==
Award	Year	Category	Nominated work	Result	Ref.
Grammy Awards	2012	Best Latin Pop, Rock or Urban Album	Nuestra	Nominated	
Latin Grammy Awards	2011	Best Rock Album	Nuestra	Nominated	
Latin Grammy Awards	2011	Best Rock Song	"Radio Capital"	Nominated	
Latin Grammy Awards	2013	Best Rock Album	Será	Won	
Latin Grammy Awards	2013	Best Rock Song	"Hornos de Cal"	Nominated	
Latin Grammy Awards	2014	Best Short Form Music Video	"Flamingo"	Won	
Latin Grammy Awards	2023	Best Alternative Song	"Aleros/Pompeii"	Nominated	
Latin Grammy Awards	2024	Best Rock Album	Diáspora Live Vol. 1	Pending	
