= Diamante Eléctrico =

Colombian rock band

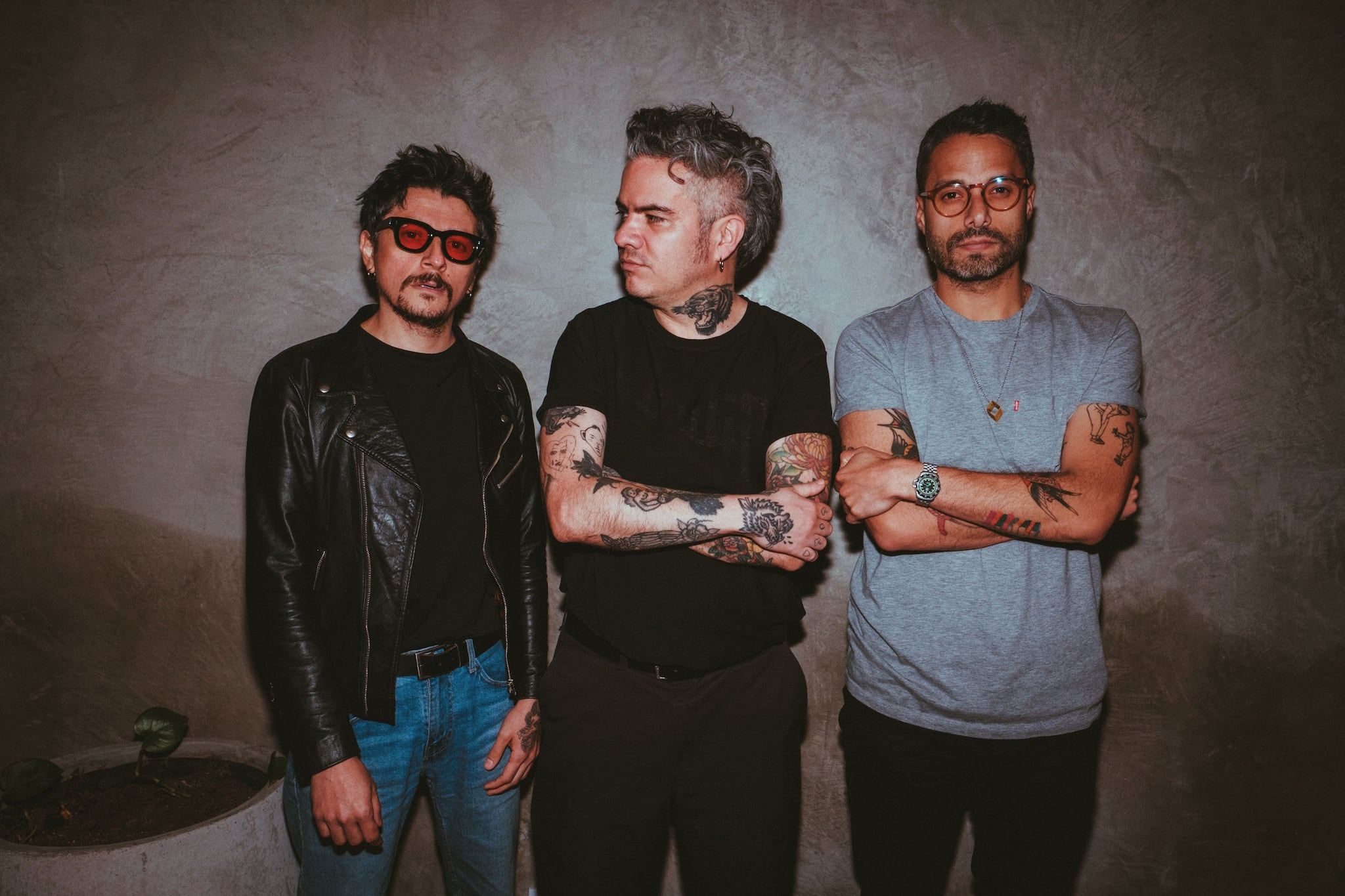
- From left to right: Andres Keguan, Juan Galeano and Daniel Alvarez

Background information
- Origin: Bogotá, Colombia
- Genres: Garage rock, Alternative rock, Indie rock, Blues rock, Post punk revival, Funk rock
- Years active: 2012-present
- Label: Cinq Music
- Members: Juan Galeano; Daniel Álvarez; Andrés Kenguan
- Past members: Andee Zeta

Diamante Eléctrico is a Colombian rock band formed in 2012. The band consists of Juan Galeano (vocals and bass), Daniel Álvarez (guitar) and Andrés Kenguan (guitar and synths). The band has released six studio albums and has received four Latin Grammy Awards, including Best Rock Album twice.

== Career ==
The band was formed in 2012, with the three members, Juan Galeano, Daniel Álvarez and Andee Zeta, having previous experiences with music, Galeano studied jazz in Rotterdam, Álvarez studied sound engineering in New York and Zeta had many years of background as a drummer, they met in one of Galeano's musical projects and then formed the band in 2012 in Bogotá, Colombia. Their first album Diamante Eléctrico was released in 2013 and was funded through crowdfunding in Kickstarter reaching over 5,000 dollars for the production of the album. The band won Best Rock Group at the SHOCK Awards in 2013 and received the award for Breakthrough Iberoamerican Artist by POTQ Magazine in 2014.

On March 17, 2015, the band released their second album B, it was recorded by Daniel Bustos in Bogotá and mastered by Gavin Lurssen in Los Angeles. The album won Best Rock Album at the 16th Annual Latin Grammy Awards while the song "Todo Va a Arder" was nominated for Best Rock Song. Their third album La Gran Oscilación was released on September 7, 2016, through Cinq Music and was produced by Joshua Vance Smith. The project was accompanied by the documentary Después de la Espera, which shows the production process for the album. At the 18th Annual Latin Grammy Awards, the album won Best Rock Album and the single "Déjala Rodar" won Best Rock Song.

In 2017, the band performed at the Coachella Festival. Their fourth album Buitres was released in 2018, the album was recorded at Nebula Studios in Bogotá and mixed at Electric Lady Studios in New York. The album was followed by Buitres & Co., released on 2019, which consists of new versions of the songs from Buitres with different guest singers such as Enrique Bunbury, Alison Mosshart, Rawayana, LosPetitFellas, Francisca Valenzuela and Kase.O from Violadores del Verso.

On February 11, 2021, the band released their sixth album Mira Lo Que Me Hiciste Hacer, the album was recorded during the quarantines due to the COVID-19 pandemic and had production from Andrés Rebellón and mastering by Gavin Lurssen, the project was dedicated to Daniel Bustos, who worked as engineer for the band's previous albums and died in 2020. The album received nominations for Best Pop/Rock Album at the 22nd Annual Latin Grammy Awards, as well as for Best Latin Rock or Alternative Album at the 64th Annual Grammy Awards, being the band's first Grammy nomination.

== Influences ==
For their third album, the band found inspiration in the bands Led Zeppelin and Black Sabbath.

== Discography ==
- Diamante Eléctrico (2013)
- B (2015)
- La Gran Oscilación (2016)
- Buitres (2018)
- Buitres & Co. (2019)
- Mira Lo Que Me Hiciste Hacer (2021)
- Leche de Tigre (2023)
- MALHABLADO (2024)

== Awards and nominations ==
Award	Year	Category	Nominated work	Result	Ref.
Grammy Awards	2022	Best Latin Rock or Alternative Album	Mira Lo Que Me Hiciste Hacer	Nominated	
Latin Grammy Awards	2015	Best Rock Album	B	Won	
Latin Grammy Awards	2015	Best Rock Song	"Todo Va a Arder"	Nominated	
Latin Grammy Awards	2017	Best Rock Song	"Déjala Rodar"	Won	
Latin Grammy Awards	2017	Best Rock Album	La Gran Oscilación	Won	
Latin Grammy Awards	2021	Record of the Year	"Suéltame, Bogotá"	Nominated	
Latin Grammy Awards	2021	Song of the Year	"A Veces"	Nominated	
Latin Grammy Awards	2021	Best Pop/Rock Song	"A Veces"	Nominated	
Latin Grammy Awards	2021	Best Pop/Rock Album	Mira Lo Que Me Hiciste Hacer	Nominated	
Latin Grammy Awards	2023	Best Rock Song	"Leche de Tigre"	Won	
Latin Grammy Awards	2024	Best Rock Song	"Algo Bueno Tenía Que Tener (Bogotá)"	Pending	
Premios Nuestra Tierra	2024	Best Rock/Alternative/Indie Song	"Leche de Tigre"	Won	
