= Charliepapa =

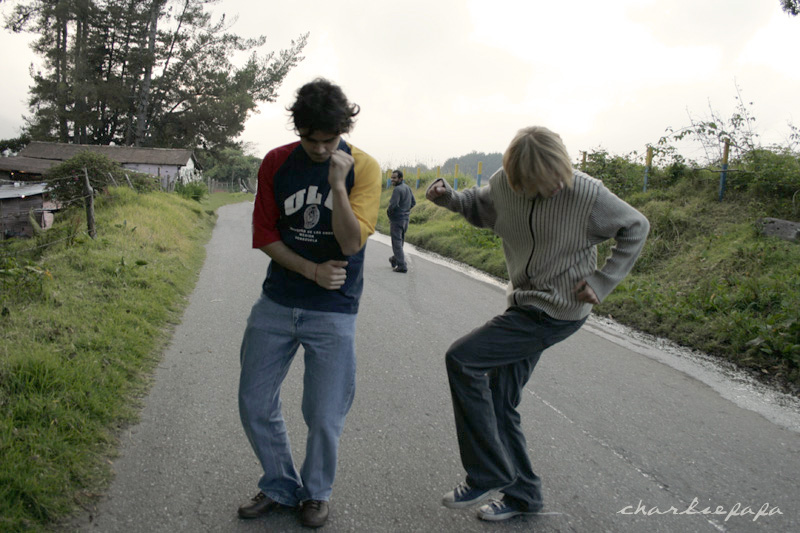

Background information
- Origin: Mérida, Venezuela
- Genres: Rock
- Years active: 2001-present
- Members: Mattia Medina Felix Hoffmann; Osheye Rebolledo Jonathan Bellomo

Charliepapa is a Venezuelan pop rock band formed in Mérida in 2001. The current lineup consists of Mattia Medina (guitar, vocals), Osheye Rebolledo (bass, backing vocals), Felix Hoffmann (drums), and Jonathan Bellomo (guitar).

== History ==
In 2009, they earned an honorable mention at Venezuela's prestigious Festival Nuevas Bandas.

For their 2011 self-named album, the band collaborated with producer Carlos Imperatori and Camilo Froideval, recording across Caracas, Mexico City, and Texas' Sonic Ranch studio.

Between late 2013 and February 2014, Charliepapa worked on new material with producers Carlos Imperatori, Rudy Pagliuca and Héctor Castillo. Released on 19 May 2015, Y/O was preceded by singles "Astrómetra" and "Merlina", followed by "Bengala", whose music video, filmed in Barcelona, Spain, paid homage to GoldenEye.

At the 2015 Pepsi Music Awards, they won three trophies: Rock Artist of the Year, Rock Song of the Year ("Astrómetra"), and Best Video. The album also earned two Latin Grammy nominations (Best Rock Album for Y/O and Best Rock Song for "Astrómetra").

== Members ==
- Mattia Medina – vocals, guitar
- Osheye Rebolledo – bass guitar, backing vocals
- Felix Hoffmann – drums
- Jonathan Bellomo – guitar

== Discography ==
=== Albums ===
- Quinta Giuliana (2008)
- 20000 leguas de viaje cuadrilátero (2011)
- Y/O (2015)

=== EPs ===
- Esfera (2021)
