= Chances (Illya Kuryaki and the Valderramas) =

Studio album by Illya Kuryaki and the Valderramas
- Released: October 31, 2012
- Genres: Funk rock, Hip hop, Reggae, Dance pop
- Length: 56:50
- Label: Sony Music Latin
- Producer: Rafael Arcaute

Illya Kuryaki and the Valderramas chronology
Kuryakistan (2001)	Chances (2012)	L.H.O.N. (2016)

Chances is the seventh studio album by Argentine musical duo Illya Kuryaki and the Valderramas, released on October 31, 2012, through Sony Music Latin. The album was produced by the members of the duo, Dante Spinetta and Emmanuel Horvilleur, alongside Rafael Arcaute, it was mixed by Rafa Sardina, mastered by Chris Gehringer and includes a collaboration with Mexican band Molotov.

The album was recorded at three different studios in Argentina, Ave Sexua, Unísono and Casa Submarina, and was the first album released by the duo since their reunion in 2011, almost eleven years after their previous album, Kuryakistan, released on 2001, the same year the duo split.

At the 14th Annual Latin Grammy Awards, the album was nominated for Best Alternative Music Album, additionally the duo received four more nominations, "Amor" was nominated for Best Urban Performance, "Ula Ula" won Best Urban Song and was nominated for Best Short Form Music Video and "Monta el Trueno" received a nomination for Best Alternative Song. The album also won Record of the Year, Best Rock Group Album, Best Cover Design and Best Recording Engineering and was nominated for Album of the Year at the Gardel Awards of 2013, the song "Ula Ula" also won Best Music Video.

== Critical reception ==
Professional ratings
Review scores
Source	Rating
AllMusic	3.5/5 stars

Mariano Prunes from AllMusic gave the album 3.5 out of 5 stars commenting that the album "is an extremely accomplished collection of hard Latin funk that functions more as a recap for IKV than a new beginning", he also called the album "a bit of a disappointment" compared to the duo's previous efforts, writing that the album as the comeback of the duo "has actually become a rightful reason to celebrate, even if the joy is almost entirely derived from IKV's comeback, rather than from the songs themselves".

== Other media ==
Their song Funky Futurista was included in the official FIFA 14 soundtrack by EA Sports

== Track listing ==
Chances
No.	Title	Writer(s)	Length
1.	"Ula Ula"	Emmanuel Horvilleur, Dante Spinetta	4:03
2.	"Funky Futurista"	Horvilleur, Spinetta	3:55
3.	"Adelante"	Horvilleur, Spinetta	4:01
4.	"Águila Amarilla"	Horvilleur, Spinetta	4:01
5.	"Chica"	Horvilleur, Spinetta	3:46
6.	"Amor"	Horvilleur, Spinetta	4:01
7.	"Celebración"	Horvilleur, Spinetta	3:55
8.	"El Encuentro"	Horvilleur, Spinetta	4:25
9.	"Soy Música"	Horvilleur, Spinetta	4:03
10.	"Helicópteros"	Horvilleur, Spinetta	3:06
11.	"Madafaka" (with Molotov)	Horvilleur, Spinetta, Ismael «Tito» Fuentes de Garay, Francisco Ayala Gonzáles, Miguel Ángel Huidobro Preciado, Randy Ebright Wildeman	4:05
12.	"Yacaré"	Horvilleur, Spinetta	3:56
13.	"Safari Espiritual"	Horvilleur, Spinetta	3:59
14.	"Monta el Trueno"	Horvilleur, Spinetta	5:34
Total length:			57:50
