= Nuestra =

Studio album by La Vida Bohème
- Released: 10 May 2010
- Genre: Latin rock; indie rock; post-punk; dance-punk
- Length: 49:01
- Label: Nacional
- Producer: Rudy Pagliuca

La Vida Bohème chronology
La Vida Bohème (EP) (2007)	Nuestra (2010)	Será (2013)

Singles from Nuestra
- 1. "Radio Capital" Released: 2011; 2. "Danz!" Released: 2011

Nuestra is the debut studio album of the Venezuelan rock band La Vida Bohème, released in August 2010. Recorded and produced by Rudy Pagliuca, it is a free download on the website of the record label All of the Above.

The album was nominated for "Best Latin Pop, Rock or Urban Album" in the 54th Grammy Awards. The two singles from this album are "Radio Capital" and "Danz!".

== Background and recording ==
The album was recorded in Caracas in 2009, on fairly independent terms. Guitarist Daniel de Sousa happened to be studying engineering at the time, and took on designing a distortion pedal that was used on the album. The synths were designed/programmed by fellow Venezuelan artist Arca, then known as Nuuro.

== In popular culture ==
The song "El Buen Salvaje" is included in the video game FIFA 12, winning the MTV Game Awards 2012 for "Best song in a video game".

"Radio Capital" is present in the Rockstar's video game Grand Theft Auto V, in which it is played on the East Los FM station.

== Track listing ==
No.	Title	Writer(s)	Length
1.	"Radio Capital"	Henry D'Arthenay	4:33
2.	"Cigarro"	Henry D'Arthenay; Moisés Enghelberg	3:38
3.	"El Buen Salvaje"	Henry D'Arthenay	3:28
4.	"Flamingo"	Henry D'Arthenay	5:00
5.	"El Zar"	Henry D'Arthenay	4:01
6.	"Danz!"	Henry D'Arthenay; Sebastián Ayala	2:39
7.	"Calle Barcelona"	Henry D'Arthenay; Sebastián Ayala	3:31
8.	"Huxley"	Daniel de Sousa	3:46
9.	"I.P.O.S.T.E.L."	Henry D'Arthenay	4:13
10.	"El Sentimiento ha Muerto"	Henry D'Arthenay; César Elster	3:32
11.	"Nicaragua"	Henry D'Arthenay	5:01
12.	"Nuestra"	Henry D'Arthenay; Daniel de Sousa; Sebastián Ayala	5:33

== Personnel ==
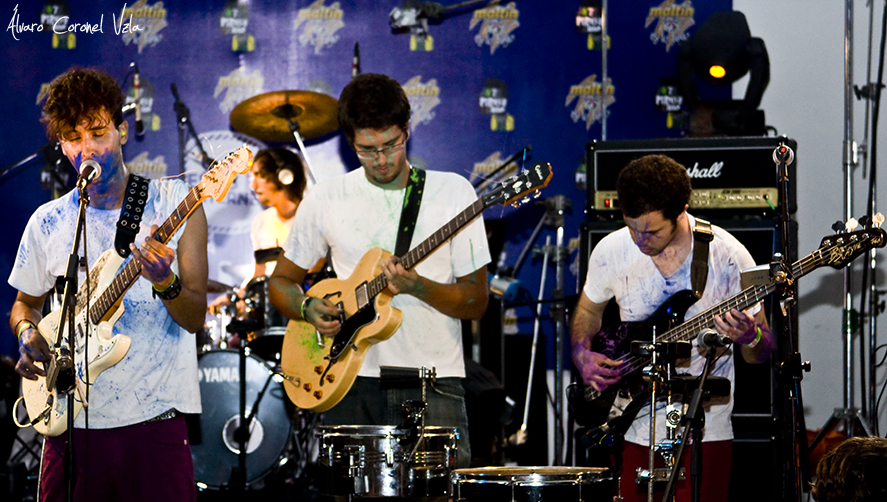
La Vida Bohème

- Henry D'Arthenay: vocals, rhythm guitar, keyboards, synthesizer
- Daniel de Sousa: lead guitar, vocals, drums, cowbell
- Rafael Pérez Medina: bass, backing vocals
- Sebastián Ayala: drums, backing vocals

== See also ==
- Gabba Gabba Hey
