= Rodrigo Crespo =

- Born: 18 June 1979 (age 47)
- Origin: Buenos Aires, Argentina
- Genres: Rock, pop
- Occupations: Singer, producer, songwriter, performer
- Instrument: Electric guitar
- Years active: 2003–present
- Website: rocrespo.com

Rodrigo Crespo (born 18 June 1979) is an Argentinian musician, producer, songwriter and performer based in Los Angeles. He began working as a producer at a young age in the city of Buenos Aires. He worked closely with the Music Brokers record label and produced the Bossa N' Stones compilation, an album of The Rolling Stones remakes in Bossa Nova style, that went on to sell over 1 million copies in over 35 territories. After the success of Bossa N' Stones, Rodrigo Crespo produced and arranged the Bossa N' Marley compilation. He is the lead singer of the electro-rock band in Sonic Lights, currently working on their debut album.

== Career ==
In 2019, Rodrigo was nominated for a Latin Grammy Award at the 20th Annual Latin Grammy Awards in the category of Best Rock Song for his song Conectar from his debut solo album Careta. In 2010, Rodrigo Crespo worked alongside Colombian singer Shakira for whom he produced remixes of the songs Sale El Sol and Loca from Shakira's 9th studio album Sale El Sol. Prior to that, Rodrigo Crespo worked on a remix of the song Timor from her album Oral Fixation, Vol. 2.

In 2012, Crespo produced and co-wrote the album TOGETHER for British/Portuguese singer and performer Ana Free. The album was recorded in Buenos Aires, London and Lisbon. Rodrigo Crespo was the musical director for the tour dates Ana Free played in Singapore at The Hard Rock Hotel in May 2012 for both live shows and MTV Asia

In 2009 Rodrigo Crespo produced the record Altavoz for Argentinian pop artist Daniela Herrero who won the prestigious Premios Carlos Gardel award for Best Female Album in 2004.

== Discography ==
=== Albums ===
- Careta (2019) Rodrigo Crespo
- Prender Un Fuego (2018) Marilina Bertoldi
- The Weight Of The Soul (2015) Ana Free
- Songs About NY (2013) Martin Delahaye
- Together (2012) Ana Free
- The Glammers (2012) The Glammers
- Essentials (2011) Karen Souza
- Atomo (2011) Marcelo Torres, Pablo La Porta
- Ojos De Perro (2007) Asociacion La Triple P
- Nu Cubana (2010)
- Altavoz (2009) Daniela Herrero
- Prive: The Lounge Anthology (2009) alongside Thievery Corporation, Kaskade
- Chill Jazz Sessions (2009)
- Eleven (2008) Pablo La Porta
- Amnesia Ibiza Vol. 4 (2007)
- Amnesia Ibiza Vol. 3 (2007)
- Fashion TV Chill Out Session (2007)
- House Trilogy, Triple Edition (2007)
- Uno Solo (2006) Pablo La Porta
- Chill N Brazil (2006)
- Bossa N' Stones Songbook (2006)
- How Deep Is Your House? (2007) Lalaan
- Bossa N'Marley (2004)
- Bossa N' Stones, Vol. 1 (2004)
- Jazz RMXS (2004) Dual Sessions

=== Singles ===
- "Sale El Sol" (2012) Shakira
- "Loca" (2012) Shakira
- "Timor" (2005) Shakira
- "Cheek To Cheek" (2004) Louis Armstrong
