= Illya Kuryaki and the Valderramas =

Argentine band

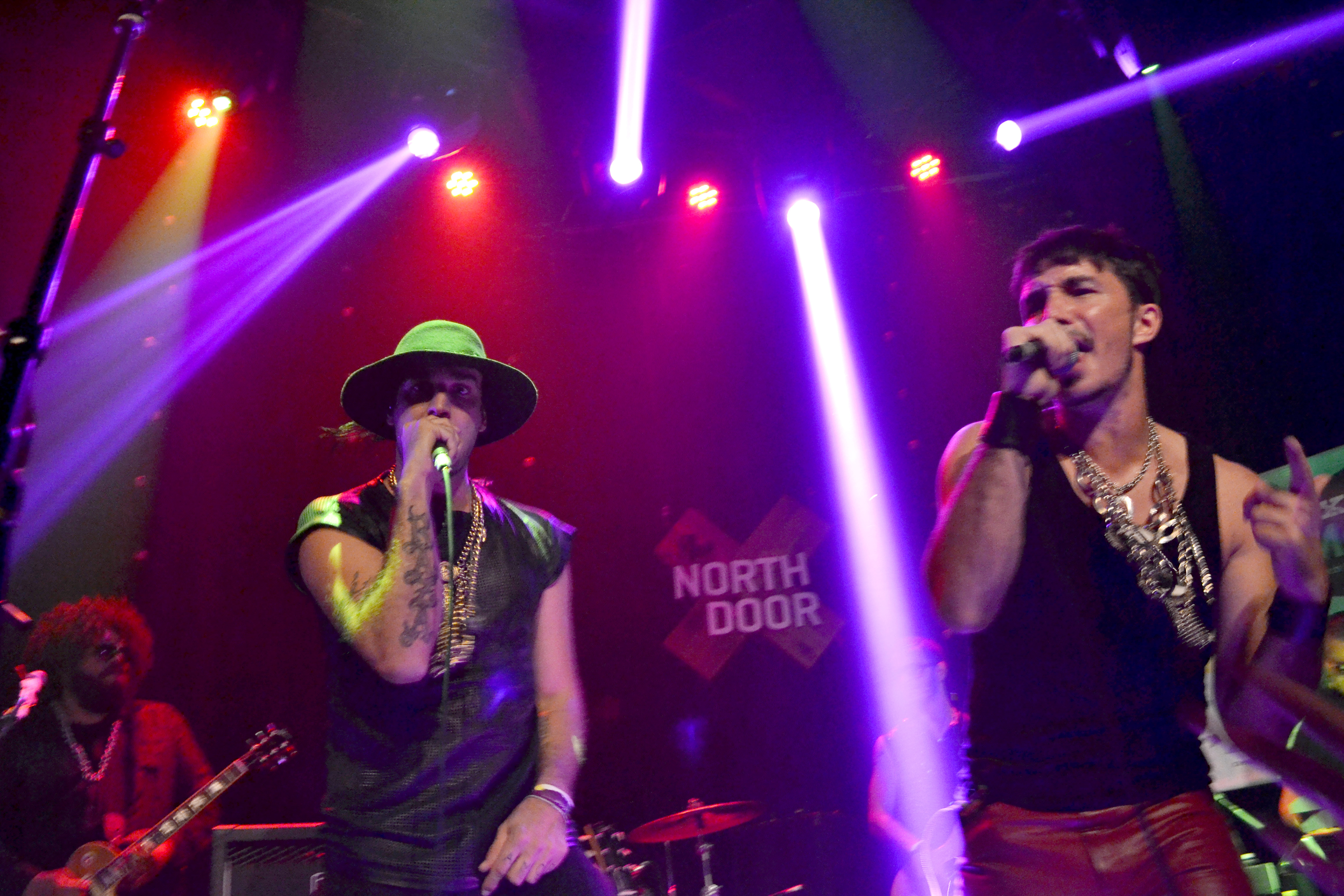
- The band performing at SXSW 2014

Background information
- Origin: Buenos Aires, Argentina
- Genres: Hip hop; Funk; Alternative R&B; pop; rock
- Years active: 1991–2001, 2011–present
- Labels: Universal Music Group, Sony Music Entertainment
- Website: ikvoficial.com

Illya Kuryaki and the Valderramas (IKV) is an Argentine musical duo from Buenos Aires, formed in 1991 and consisting of Dante Spinetta and Emmanuel Horvilleur. The duo split in 2001 to follow solo careers, but later performed together several times, and officially reunited in 2011. The duo took their name from a fictional character, the Soviet spy Illya Kuryakin in the hit 1960s TV show The Man from U.N.C.L.E., and the Colombian football player Carlos Valderrama. Their musical style is extremely wide-ranging, including hip-hop, rock, funk, and salsa.

== History ==
The duo met as children as a result of the friendship between their parents. Spinetta is the son of musician Luis Alberto Spinetta, and Horvilleur's father is photographer Eduardo Marti. In 1987, when Horvilleur and Dante were 12 and 11 years old respectively, Them and younger siblings formed a music group called Pechugo. Pechugo dissolved one year later, and the duo decided to form Illya Kuryaki and The Valderramas.

Fabrico cuero (1991–1992)

In 1991 they released their first album entitled Fabrico cuero (I make leather), which combines rap, synthesized sounds, catchy melodies and ironic lyrics. Although some in the media initially suggested their popularity came from their family connections rather than their musical skills, that changed when Charly García invited them to play at one of his shows to perform Fabrico cuero and Rap del exilio. They shared the stage with Luis Alberto Spinetta in Venezuela. In 1991 they were voted as la Revelación (best newcomers) in the newspaper Clarín.

Horno para calentar los mares (1993–1994)

In 1993, sales allowed them their second album, Horno para calentar los mares (Oven to warm up the seas), much harder than the previous one, with a new record label, PolyGram. It contains No Way Jose and Virgen de riña. The album was not widely distributed. It features Tweety González.

Chaco (1995)

With their savings they went on to record what would be their most successful album, Chaco. They chose to create their own record label, Gigolo Productions. Chaco sold over 250,000 copies. The album was chosen by Rolling Stone magazine in Argentina as one of the best rock productions of the country. The single from the album, Abarájame, received the Latin MTV Award for Best Latin MTV Video of the Year in 1996. According to band members "Chaco is a summary of what happened to us musically and socially in recent times. The record suggests a new state of mind in which there is no place for discrimination or oppression." The name comes from Chaco, which is one of the few provinces in Argentina where aboriginals still live. At this point they began to show their love of martial arts in their videos.

MTV Unplugged Ninja Mental (1996)

They performed different versions of well-known songs and included two new ones which became part of their next album, Versus.

Versus (1997–1998)

Working in the U.S., they recorded their fifth studio album at Ocean Recording Studios, Burbank, and Battery Studios, New York, leaning more to soul music and funk music. It was mastered at Sony Studios, New York and mixed at Battery Studios, New York. The first cut was "Expedición al Klama Hama". In 1998, the album's second cut, "Jugo", was nominated for best group video and best alternative video at the MTV Latino Music Awards. The album includes rock, funk, hip hop and ballads.

Leche (1999–2000)

Leche (Milk) was influenced by African-American music and funk. The album features bass player Bootsy Collins, who introduces himself saying, "My name is Bootsy Collins, old woman!" Leche was nominated for Best Rock Album at the first annual Latin Grammy Awards (eligibility year of 1 January 1999, through 31 March 2000). The extracted single "Coolo" was featured on the soundtrack of the movie "Amores Perros"

Kuryakistan (2001–2002)

This album includes new versions of old tracks, remixes and hits of their career, plus four new tracks. The death of the duo's friend and manager José Luis Miceli, who died in a car crash in early 2000 had a big impact on them. The album was dedicated to him and included the songs A-dios and Hermano as a personal homage, as well as a cover version of Queen's classic song "Another One Bites the Dust". A New York Times article considered the music to be "surreal poetry, full of rebelliousness, death and raunchy transfiguration", and mentioned that in the lyrics of Jennifer del Estero, "Jennifer Lopez leaves her derriere in the singer's freezer."

=== Split ===
The band split after 11 years in 2001. Both Dante and Emmanuel continued solo performing careers. Emmanuel focused on a rock and pop-rock sound, while Dante preferred hip-hop.

They played on stage together at the Vive Latino Festival 2008. On 24 April 2009, they also reunited as the opening act of the Puerto Rican duo Calle 13 at the G.E.B.A. stadium in Buenos Aires.

=== Reunited ===
Chances (2012-2014)

They officially reunited in 2011. They participated in the musical festival Mundo Invisible in December 2011. Chances was released by Sony in 2012, and includes the song "Águila Amarilla", for Dante's father, Luis Alberto Spinetta, who died during the recording of the album.

"Ula Ula" featuring Raquel Sophia was used in the USA in a commercial for Target. The Height of Summer ad was so catchy that even Oprah Winfrey tweeted that she could not stop singing it. At the Latin Grammy Awards of 2013, it won "Best Urban Song". They were also nominated for other 3 additional categories that night. "Funky Futurista" was used in the soundtrack of FIFA 14.

L.H.O.N. (2016-2017)

In 2016, IKV released their seventh studio album, titled L.H.O.N. (La Humanidad O Nosotros) through Epic/Sony Music Argentina. Singles released from the album are "Gallo Negro", "Sigue", "Los Angeles", '"Ritmo Mezcal'" and '"Estrella Fugaz" (feat. Miguel), all with accompanying official music videos. They embarked on a worldwide tour which included dates in Europe, Latin America and their native Argentina.

In late 2016, the album was nominated at the 17th Annual Latin Grammy Awards for Best Alternative Music Album and won. The video for "Gallo Negro" also won Best Short Form Music Video that night.

== Musical style ==
The musical style of Illya Kuryaki and the Valderramas has always been hard to precisely categorize, as it is extremely wide-ranging. It encompasses soul, funk, hip-hop and other African-American rhythms, as well as rock, reggaeton, alternative, electronica, heavy metal and rap metal. The Miami Herald placed them within the "wilder side of rock en español".

They usually quote their musical influences as Prince, Michael Jackson, Wu-Tang Clan, Jamiroquai and most 70s and 80s funk and disco music groups.

== Discography ==
Studio albums

- Fabrico cuero (1991)
- Horno para calentar los mares (1993)
- Chaco (1995)
- Versus (1997)
- Leche (1999)
- Chances (2012)
- L.H.O.N. (La humanidad o nosotros) (2016)

Live albums

- MTV Unplugged: Ninja Mental (1996)
- Aplaudan En La Luna (2014)

Compilations

- Kuryakistan (2001)
- Abarajame (EP) (2003)

== Nominations ==
- 2016: Berlin Music Video Awards, Most Trashy for 'GALLO NEGRO'
