= 9th Annual Latin Grammy Awards =

Music awards presented Nov 2008

9th Latin Grammy Awards
- Date: November 13, 2008
- Venue: Toyota Center, Houston, Texas
- Hosted by: Cristián de la Fuente and Patricia Manterola

Highlights
- Person of the Year: Gloria Estefan

Television/radio coverage
- Network: Univision
- Viewership: 5.8 million

The 9th Annual Latin Grammy Awards took place on Thursday, November 13, 2008, at the Toyota Center in Houston, Texas and were aired on Univision. The Brazilian Field awards were presented on the same day at the Ibirapuera Auditorium in São Paulo. The Latin Recording Academy Person of the Year was Gloria Estefan. Juanes was the night's big winner, winning 5 awards including Album of the Year. He now has 17 Latin Grammy awards which is more than any other recording artist. The show was watched by an average of 5.8 millions.

== Awards ==
Winners are in bold text.

=== General ===
Record of the Year

Juanes — "Me Enamora"

- Andrea Bocelli and Laura Pausini — "Vive Ya! (Vivere)"
- Cabas — "Bonita"
- Café Tacuba — "Volver a Comenzar"
- Julieta Venegas — "El presente"

Album of the Year

Juanes — La Vida... Es un Ratico

- Concha Buika — Niña de Fuego
- Café Tacvba — Sino
- Vicente Fernández — Para Siempre
- Kany García — Cualquier Día

Song of the Year

Juanes — "Me Enamora"

- Julieta Venegas — "El presente"
- Café Tacuba — "Esta Vez"
- Kany García — "Hoy Ya Me Voy"
- Aureo Baqueiro and Gian Marco — "Todavía"

Best New Artist

Kany García

- Mónica Giraldo
- Diogo Nogueira
- Roberta Sá
- Ximena Sariñana

=== Pop ===
Best Female Pop Vocal Album

Kany García — Cualquier Día

- Ana Gabriel — Arpegios de Amor: Requiem por Tres Almas
- Alejandra Guzmán — Fuerza
- Ednita Nazario — Real
- Rosario — Parte de Mí

Best Male Pop Vocal Album

Juanes — La Vida... Es un Ratico

- Ricardo Arjona — Quién Dijo Ayer
- Jeremías — Un Día Más En El Gran Circo
- Alejandro Lerner — Enojado
- Gian Marco — Desde Adentro

Best Pop Album by a Duo/Group with Vocals

Belanova — Fantasía Pop

- Hombres G — 10
- Kudai — Nadha
- Kumbia All Starz — Planeta Kumbia
- RBD — Empezar Desde Cero

=== Urban ===
Best Urban Music Album

Wisin & Yandel — Los Extraterrestres

- Alexis & Fido — Sobrenatural
- Tego Calderón — El Abayarde Contraataca
- Flex — Te Quiero: Romantic Style In Da World
- Tito El Bambino — It's My Time

Best Urban Song

Flex — "Te Quiero"

- Tingui and Daddy Yankee — "Al Son del Boom" (Miguelito featuring Daddy Yankee)
- Tito El Bambino — "El Tra"
- Tego Calderón — "Ni Fu Ni Fa"
- Alexis, Fido and Toby Love — "Soy Igual Que Tú"

=== Rock ===
Best Rock Solo Vocal Album

Andrés Calamaro — La Lengua Popular

- Chetes — Efecto Dominó
- Alih Jey — Necia
- Juanse — Energía Divina
- Loquillo — Balmoral
- Siddhartha — Why You?

Best Rock Album by a Duo/Group with Vocals

Molotov — Eternamiente

- Bersuit — ?
- Catupecu Machu — Laberintos Entre Artistas y Dialectos
- Héroes del Silencio — Tour 2007
- Panda — Sinfonía Soledad

Best Rock Song

Café Tacuba — "Esta Vez"

- Javier Morales — "Ayer" (Black Guayaba)
- Andrés Calamaro and Cachorro López — "Carnaval de Brasil" (Andrés Calamaro)
- Andrés Calamaro — "Mi Gin Tonic"
- Randy Ebright — "Yofo" (Molotov)

=== Alternative ===
Best Alternative Music Album

Julieta Venegas — MTV Unplugged

- Babasónicos — Mucho
- Café Tacuba — Si No
- Circo — Cursi
- Manu Chao — La Radiolina

Best Alternative Song

Café Tacuba — "Volver a Comenzar"

- José Luis Abreu, Marteen Andruet and Orlando Méndez — "Alguien" (Circo)
- Andrés Calamaro — "5 Minutos Más (Minibar)"
- Juan Campodónico and Fernando Santullo — "El Mareo" (Bajofondo featuring Gustavo Cerati)
- Ximena Sariñana — "Normal"
- María del Mar Rodríguez Carnero — "Papeles Mojados" (Chambao)

=== Tropical ===
Best Salsa Album

Marc Anthony — El Cantante

- Grupo Galé — Auténtico
- Víctor Manuelle — Soy
- Maelo Ruiz — Puro Corazón...
- Gilberto Santa Rosa — Contraste

Best Cumbia/Vallenato Album

Peter Manjarrés, Emiliano Zuleta and Sergio Luis — Sólo Clásicos

- Chicas de Canela — Chicas de Canela
- El Combo de las Estrellas — Somos La Esencia
- Gusi & Beto — La Mandarina
- Emilianito Zuleta and Toba Zuleta — Palabra de Honor

Best Contemporary Tropical Album

José Feliciano — Señor Bachata

- Joe Arroyo — El Súper Joe
- Fonseca — Gratitud
- Adriana Lucía — Porro Nuevo
- Olga Tañón — Éxitos en Dos Tiempos

Best Traditional Tropical Album

Gloria Estefan — 90 Millas

- Albita, Rey Ruiz and Donato Poveda — Cuba: Un Viaje Musical
- Chucho Avellanet with Trío Los Andinos — Bohemio
- Edwin Colón Zayas — El Cuarto Puertorriqueño... Reafirmación
- Víctor Manuelle — Una Navidad A Mi Estilo

Best Tropical Song

- **Emilio Estefan, Jr., Gloria Estefan, Alberto Gaitán and Ricardo Gaitán — "Píntame De Colores" (Gloria Estefan)**
- Juan José Hernández — "Conteo Regresivo" (Gilberto Santa Rosa)
- Víctor Manuelle — "Llegó El Amor" (Gilberto Santa Rosa)
- Jorge Celedón — "Me Vio Llorar" (Jorge Celedón and Jimmy Zambrano)

=== Singer-Songwriter ===
Best Singer-Songwriter Album

Fito Páez — Rodolfo

- Djavan — Matizes
- Gilberto Gil — Banda Larga Cordel
- Pablo Milanés — Regalo
- Tommy Torres — Tarde O Temprano

=== Regional Mexican ===
Best Ranchero Album

Vicente Fernández — Para Siempre

- Pepe Aguilar — 100% Mexicano
- Pedro Fernández — Dime Mi Amor
- Los Temerarios — Recuerdos del Alma
- Jenni Rivera — La Diva en Vivo

Best Banda Album

Los Horóscopos de Durango — Ayer, Hoy y Siempre

- Banda el Recodo — Qué Bonito... ¡Es Lo Bonito!
- El Chapo — Mis Rancheras Consentidas
- Los Creadorez del Pasito Duranguense de Alfredo Ramírez — Listos, Montados y Armados
- Joan Sebastian — No Es De Madera

Best Tejano Album

Emilio Navaira — De Nuevo

- Chente Barrera & Taconazo — Music Lessons
- Jimmy González & El Grupo Mazz — Incomparable
- Freddie Martínez — The Legend Returns
- Elida Reyna — Domingo

Best Norteño Album

Siggno — Six Pack

- Conjunto Primavera — Que Ganas de Volver
- Los Palominos — Me Enamoré de un Angel
- Los Tigres del Norte — Raíces
- Pesado — Corridos: Defendiendo el Honor

Best Regional Mexican Song

Joan Sebastian — "Estos Celos" (Vicente Fernández)

- Freddie Martínez, Jr. — "Búscame En El Cielo" (Jimmy González & El Grupo Mazz)
- Charlie Corona and Jesse Turner — "Decirte Te Quiero" (Siggno)
- Adolfo Angel — "Si Tú Te Vas" (Los Temerarios)

=== Instrumental ===
Best Instrumental Album

Orquesta Filarmónica de Bogotá — Orquesta Filarmómoca de Bogotá - 40 Años

- Kenny G — Rhythm & Romance
- Paulo Moura — Pra Cá E Para Lá
- Gonzalo Rubalcaba — Avatar
- Bebo Valdés and Javier Colina — Live at the Village Vanguard

=== Traditional ===
Best Folk Album

Cholo Valderrama — Caballo!

- Damaris — Mil Caminos
- Mariza — Terra
- Perú Negro — Zamba Malató
- Walter Silva — 20 Éxitos

Best Tango Album

Various Artists — Buenos Aires, Días y Noches de Tango

- Esteban Morgado Cuarteto — Milongueros
- Luis Salinas — Tango
- Javier Vinasco and Edith Ruiz — Astos Piazzolla/Heitor Villa-Lobos
- Pablo Ziegler, Quique Sinesi and Walter Castro — Buenos Aires Report

Best Flamenco Album

Juan Habichuela — Una Guitarra En Granada

- Diego Amador — Río de los Canasteros
- Camarón de la Isla — Reencuentro
- Esperanza Fernández — Recuerdos
- Lole — Metáfora

=== Jazz ===
Best Latin Jazz Album

Caribbean Jazz Project featuring Dave Samuels — Afro Bop Alliance

- Hamilton de Holanda Quinteto — Brasilianos 2
- Pau Brasil — Nonada
- David Sánchez — Cultural Survival
- Charlie Sepúlveda & The Turnaround — Charlie Sepulveda & The Turnaround

=== Christian ===
Best Christian Album (Spanish Language)

Soraya Moraes — Tengo Sed de Tí

- Aline Barros — Refréscate!
- Alex Campos — Cuidaré de Ti
- Jesus Adrian Romero — Ayer Te Ví... Fue Más Claro Que La Luna
- Marcos Witt — Sinfonía del Alma

Best Christian Album (Portuguese Language)

Soraya Moraes — Som Da Chuva

- Aline Barros — Aline Barros & CIA 2
- Fernanda Brum — Cura-Me
- Toque No Altar — E Impossivel Mas Deus Pode
- Andre Valadao — Sobrenatural
- Italo Villar — Deus Sonha Com Vocé

=== Brazilian ===
Best Brazilian Contemporary Pop Album

Vanessa da Mata — Sim

- Arnaldo Antunes — Ao Vivo no Estúdio
- Danni Carlos — Música Nova
- Ney Matogrosso — Inflassificáveis
- Rosa Passos — Romance

Best Brazilian Rock Album

CPM 22 — Cidade Cinza

- Charlie Brown Jr. — Ritmo, Ritual e Responsa
- Detonautas Roque Clube — O Retorno de Saturno
- Nação Zumbi — Fome de Tudo
- Pitty — {Des}concerto ao Vivo - 06-07-07 Traje: (Rock Fino)

Best Samba/Pagode Album

Paulinho da Viola — Acústico MTV

Maria Rita — Samba Meu

- Beth Carvalho — Canta o Samba da Bahia ao Vivo
- Arlindo Cruz — Sambista Perfeito
- Luiz Melodia — Estação Melodia

Best MPB Album

Seu Jorge — América Brasil o Disco

- Maria Bethânia — Dentro do Mar Tem Rio - Ao Vivo
- Chico Buarque — Chico Buarque Carioca - Ao Vivo
- Omara Portuondo and Maria Bethânia — Omara Portuondo e Maria Bethânia
- Roberta Sá — Que Belo Estranho Dia Pra Se Ter Alegria
- Caetano Veloso — Multishow ao Vivo Cê

Best Romantic Music Album

César Menotti & Fabiano — .com Você

- Bruno & Marrone — Acústico II - Volume 1
- Daniel — Difícil Não Falar de Amor
- Leonardo — Coração Bandido
- Roberta Miranda — Senhora Raiz

Best Contemporary Brazilian Roots Album

Elba Ramalho — Qual o Assunto Que Mais Lhe Interessa?

- Harmonia do Samba — Esse Som Vai Te Levar - Ao Vivo
- Trio Curupira — Pés no Brasil, Cabeça no Mundo
- Trio Virgulino — 26 Anos de Estrada
- Victor & Leo — Ao Vivo em Uberlândia

Best Brazilian Roots/Regional Album

Chitãozinho & Xororó — Grandes Clássicos Sertanejos Acústico I

- Pedro Bento and Zé da Estrada — 50 Anos de Mariachis & Grandes Sucessos Sertanejos
- Banda Calypso — Acústico
- Cezar & Paulinho — Companheiro é Companheiro
- Siba e A Fuloresta — Toda Vez Que Eu Dou Um Passo o Mundo Sai Dolugar

Best Brazilian Song

Marco Moraes and Soraya Moraes — "Som da Chuva" (Soraya Moraes)

- Vanessa da Mata and Sérgio Mendes — "Acode"
- Dudu Falcão — "Coisas Que Eu Sei" (Danni Carlos)
- Djavan — "Delírio dos Mortais"
- Jota Maranhão and Jorge Vercillo — "Ela Une Todas as Coisas" (Jorge Vercillo)

=== Children's ===
Best Latin Children Album

Miguelito — El Heredero

- Claraluna — Un Lugar Llamado Colombia
- Raquel Durães — Hora de Dormir
- Niños Adorando — Niños Adorando 3
- Remi — Alegrate
- Strings For Kids — Acordes para Hormiguitas y Menudas Criaturas

=== Classical ===
Best Classical Album

Plácido Domingo — Pasión Española

- Gustavo Dudamel — Fiesta
- Sérgio and Odair Assad — Jardim Abandonado
- Sílvio Barbato and Turíbio Santos — Violão Sinfônico

Best Classical Contemporary Composition

Carlos José Castro — "Concierto del Sol" (Orquesta Filarmónica de Costa Rica)
Sérgio — "Tahhiyya Li Ossoulina" (Sérgio Assad and Odair Assad)

- Jorge Liderman — "Barcelonazo" (Jorge Liderman)
- Roberto Valera — "Non Divisi" (Camerata Romeu)
- Aurelio De La Vega — "Variación del Recuerdo" (The North/South Chamber Orchestra)

=== Recording Package ===
Best Recording Package

Leicia Gotlibowski, Daniel Kotliar, Karina Levy and Mercedes Sencio — Buenos Aires, Días y Noches de Tango (Various Artists)

- Santiago Velazco-Land — Cara B (Jorge Drexler)
- Jorge du Peixe and Valentina Trajano — Fome de Tudo (Nação Zumbi)
- Gaspar Guerra — Gózalo (Orquesta La 33)
- Fritz Torres — Tijuana Sound Machine (Nortec Collective presents Bostich and Fussible)

=== Production ===
Best Engineered Album

Moogie Canazio and Luiz Tornaghi — Dentro Do Mar Tem Rio - Ao Vivo (Maria Bethânia)

- Humberto Gatica and Bernie Grundman — David Cavazos (David Cavazos)
- Gabriel Peña, Héctor Iván Rosa, Bobby Valentín and José Lugo — Evolution (Bobby Valentín)
- Ariel Alejandro Gato — Obra Inversa (Obra Inversa)
- Chris Brooke, Steve Churchyard, Humberto Gatica, Rodolfo Vazquez and Stephen Marcussen — Rhythm & Romance (Kenny G)
  - Engineers:
- Carlos "KK" Akamine, Al Schmitt and Doug Sax — Romance (Rosa Passos)

Producer of the Year

Sergio George

- Alejandro Acosta, Bob Benozzo and Roberto Cantero
- Tweety González and Ximena Sariñana
- Javier Limón
- Cachorro Lopez

=== Music video ===
Best Short Form Music Video

Juanes — "Me Enamora"

- Babasónicos — "Pijamas"
- Bajofondo — "Pa' Bailar"
- Manu Chao — "Me Llaman Calle"
- Molotov — "Yofo"

Best Long Form Music Video

Julieta Venegas — MTV Unplugged

- Miguel Bosé — Papitour
- Gloria Estefan — 90 Millas
- Joan Manuel Serrat and Joaquín Sabina — Dos Pajaros de un Tiro
- Various Artists — Buenos Aires, Días y Noches de Tango

=== Special awards ===
Lifetime Achievement Awards

- Angélica María
- Vikki Carr
- Cheo Feliciano
- Astrud Gilberto
- María Dolores Pradera
- Estela Raval

Trustees Awards

- Simón Díaz
- Larry Harlow
- Juanito Márquez

== Performers ==
- Gloria Estefan — "Mi Tierra / Oye Mi Canto"
- Gloria Estefan, José Feliciano, Gian Marco and Carlos Santana — "No Lloren"
- Kany García — "Esta Soledad"
- Café Tacuba — "Esta Vez"
- Heatt - National recording artist from Phoenix, Az
- Gilberto Santa Rosa — "Amnesía"
- Alejandra Guzmán — "Hasta el Final"
- Olga Tañón featuring Jenni Rivera and Vikki Carr — "Presencie tu Amor / Cosas del Amor"
- Julieta Venegas featuring Michael Salgado and David Lee Garza — "El presente"
- Flex and Belinda — "Te Quiero"
- Juanes featuring John Legend — "Me Enamora / Odio Por Amor / If You're Out There"
- Banda el Recodo — "Te Presumo"
- Jorge Celedón featuring Jimmy Zambrano and El Mariachi Vargas — "Que bonita es esta Vida"
- Fonseca — "El Arroyito"
- Jenni Rivera and Lupillo Rivera — "Sufriendo a Solas"
- Michael Salgado, Emiliano Zuleta, Fernando Otero, Héctor del Curto and David Lee Garza — "Especial accordion tribute"
- Los Tigres del Norte — "Somos mas Americanos"
- Víctor Manuelle — "Mi Salsa"
- Rosario, Juanes, Olga Tañón, Jeremías, Tommy Torres, Antonio Carmona and Belinda — "No Dudaria"

Live from Brazil:

- Sandy and Paula Toller — "E o Mundo Não se Acabou"
- Sepultura — "The Girl from Ipanema / We've Lost You"

== Presenters ==
- Daniela Castro and César Évora — presented Best New Artist
- Eduardo Santamarina and Montserrat Olivier — presented Best Pop Vocal Album, Female
- Carlos Santana and Ednita Nazario — presented Record of the Year
- Ximena Sariñana and Eugenio Siller — presented Best Urban Song
- Cabas and Concha Buika — presented Best Norteño Album
- Mayrín Villanueva and Grupo Pesado — presented Song of the Year
- Alexis & Fido — presented Best Contemporary Tropical Album
- Kenny G and Karyme Lozano — presented Best Tropical Song
- Kudai — presented Best Rock Song
- Tito El Bambino and Adriana Fonseca — presented Best Tejano Album
- Vicky Terrazas and Marisol Terrazas — presented Best Pop Vocal Album, Male
- Andy García — presented People of the Year
- Juan Luis Guerra — presented Album of the Year

== Trivia ==
- Gloria Estefan became the first female to receive the academy's Person of the Year award. In addition she was the first artist to receive this honor as well as the MusiCares Person of the Year honor which she received in 1994 prior to the Grammy Awards.
