= Verónica Loza =

Verónica Loza Fernández
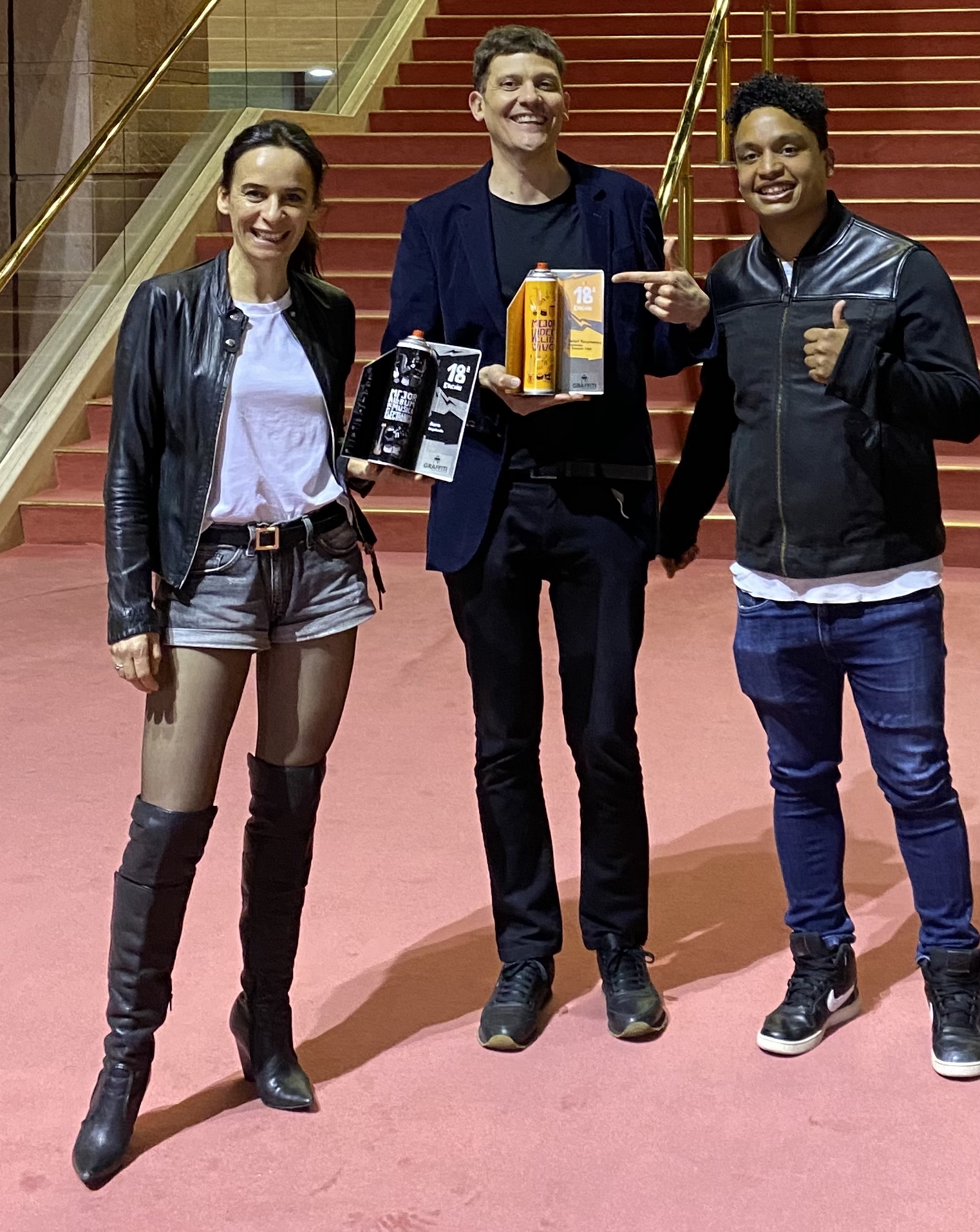
- Verónica Loza with Juan Campodonico and Matías Silva at the Graffiti Awards ceremony. Montevideo, 2020.
- Born: 1973 (age 52–53); Lavalleja, Uruguay
- Occupations: Musician, VJ, Set Designer, Visual Artist

Verónica Loza (born 1973, José Batlle y Ordóñez, Lavalleja, Uruguay) is a Uruguayan visual artist, VJ, composer, singer, lighting designer, and set designer. She is a founding member of the musical collective Bajofondo and is also part of the Campo project, led by Juan Campodónico. Throughout her career, she has worked in the fields of music, theater and dance, both in Uruguay and internationally.

Her work as a VJ in Bajofondo's live performances, as well as her work in lighting and scenography for artists such as Jorge Drexler, Cuarteto de Nos and Peyote Asesino, has been fundamental in the consolidation of the role of the visual artist in the contemporary music scene.

== Early life and education ==
Loza was born in José Batlle y Ordóñez, Lavalleja, Uruguay. At the age of ten, she moved with her family to Montevideo. She studied Theater Design at the Escuela Multidisciplinaria de Arte Dramático (EMAD), where she graduated in 1996. Since the mid-1990s, she has worked as a lighting and set designer for institutions such as the Comedia Nacional, El Galpón theater, and the Ballet Nacional Sodre.

== Career ==
=== Bajofondo ===
In 2001, Loza joined the musical project Bajofondo, created by Gustavo Santaolalla and Juan Campodónico. She contributed to the group's first album, Bajofondo Tango Club (2002), by performing a version of "Naranjo en flor," based on a homemade arrangement she created. From this sketch, Santaolalla and Campodónico produced the final version, which became one of the most prominent tracks on the album and remains a key feature of Apple Music's influential Bajofondo Essentials playlist.

When Bajofondo transitioned from a producer-driven concept to a full band, she joined as the VJ and vocalist, becoming the only female member of the group. She has toured internationally across the Americas, Europe, and Asia with the band. On the band's second album, Mar Dulce (2007), Loza co-wrote and performed the song "Tuve Sol" alongside Campodónico, Santaolalla, and Javier Casalla.

Her innovative integration of music and visuals during Bajofondo's tours played a key role in solidifying the role of the VJ in the global music scene.

=== Campo ===
In 2012, Loza began collaborating with Juan Campodónico on the debut album of Campo, contributing to the composition of the song "El viento." On their second album Tambor del Cosmos (2017), she co-authored all the tracks and provided vocals for "Duerme Agua," "Color," and "Vals del infinito." She also joined the live band as a VJ and singer.

=== Other works ===
In addition to her work with Bajofondo and Campo, Loza has designed staging and lighting for artists such as Jorge Drexler, Cuarteto de Nos, and Peyote Asesino. Notably, in 2016, she directed the set design, lighting, and visuals for the tribute concert to Alfredo Zitarrosa at Centenario Stadium in Montevideo, which featured over 30 Ibero-American artists.

In 2023, Loza presented the sculpture El Panadero, created for the Netlabs company. The work stands three meters high and is composed of a stainless steel structure with 24 segments and 228 feathers, representing a dandelion. The sculpture pays homage to Carl Sagan's Cosmos series, where the "ship of imagination" is symbolized by this flower.

== Discography ==
=== With Bajofondo ===
- Bajofondo Tango Club (2002)
- Mar Dulce (2007)
- Presente (2013)
- Aura (2019)

=== With Campo ===
- Campo (2011)
- Remixes y Rarezas (2013)
- Tambor del Cosmos (2017)
