= El Mareo =

Single by Bajofondo featuring Gustavo Cerati

from the album Mar Dulce
- Released: July 2008
- Recorded: ?-2007
- Genre: Tango music, neotango
- Label: Surco
- Songwriter(s): Juan Campodónico, Fernando Santullo
- Producer(s): Gustavo Santaolalla, Juan Campodónico

Bajofondo singles chronology
"Pa' Bailar" (2007)	"El Mareo" (2008)

"El Mareo" is a song by Argentinian-Uruguayan band Bajofondo featuring vocals by the famous Argentine rock musician Gustavo Cerati. After their successful single "Pa' Bailar" featuring Japanese bandoneonist Ryōta Komatsu and just before starting their tour through North and Latin America, the band decided to make "El Mareo" the second single from 2007s album Mar Dulce. The song was nominated on the 2008 Latin Grammy Awards, as Best Alternative Song.

== Music video ==
The music video for the single shows the band playing the song, and Santaolalla and Cerati singing in grayscale effect.

== Miscellaneous ==
On July 21, 2008, it was released as Single of the week on iTunes Store, and it was retrieved on July 27, 2008.
