= Porfiado =

Studio album by El Cuarteto de Nos
- Released: April 27, 2012
- Genres: Alternative rock; Rap rock
- Length: 49:21
- Label: Warner Music Argentina
- Producer: Juan Campodónico

El Cuarteto de Nos chronology
Bipolar (2009)	Porfiado (2012)	Habla Tu Espejo (2014)

Singles from Porfiado
- 1. "Cuando sea grande" Released: April 13, 2012; 2. "Buen día Benito" Released: October 26, 2012

Porfiado (English: Obstinate) is the thirteenth studio album by Uruguayan rock band El Cuarteto de Nos, released on April 27, 2012, through Warner Music Argentina. It was produced by Juan Campodónico and was written by Roberto Musso and Santiago Tavella, two members of the band.

At the 13th Annual Latin Grammy Awards, the album won Best Pop/Rock Album while "Cuando sea grande" won Best Pop/Rock Song, being the band's first Latin Grammys. The album also won Best Pop Album and the Audience Album of the Year award at the Graffiti Awards in 2013, given to recognize the best in Uruguayan music, additionally, the band received a Special Mention from the jury for "obtaining two Latin Grammy Awards, which highlight its growing international career and demonstrate the importance of the band as an exponent of Uruguayan music".

== Background ==
The album followed the changes in the line-up of the band that happened during the recording of their previous album Bipolar (2009), where guitarist Ricardo Musso left the band while Gustavo Antuña and Santiago Marrero joined in the guitar and keyboards respectively, Porfiado was the first album of the band with their new five-member formation. The album has been often considered as the end of a trilogy of albums, containing Raro (2006) and Bipolar (2009).

It was produced by long collaborator Juan Campodónico, mixed and recorded by Julio Berta in Montevideo, Uruguay, and mastered by Tom Baker in Los Angeles, United States. To promote the album, the band performed at the Estadio Luna Park in Buenos Aires, Argentina on June 22, 2012.

== Composition ==
The album is composed by twelve tracks, ten written by Roberto Musso and two by Santiago Tavella, both members of the band. The name of the album, "porfiado" ("obstinate" in English), relates to the obsessive characters that appear throughout the songs as well as the themes of vengeance, like in the song "Buen día Benito", about the obsession of a man with a former classmate he wants to take revenge on, and obstination, which appears in "Algo mejor que hacer", that features the lines "seré un quedado pero acá me quedo, y no intenten alterar mi estado" ("I might be an idle but here I stay, and don't try to alter my state"). Mainly an alternative rock album, Porfiado also features various genres of music such as ska in "Algo mejor que hacer", hip hop in "Cuando sea grande" and cumbia in "Enamorado tuyo".

== Critical reception ==
Professional ratings
Review scores
Source	Rating
Rolling Stone	4/5 stars

Writing for the Argentine edition of Rolling Stone, Humphrey Inzillo gave the album four out of five stars, commenting that with the album "the musical personality of Cuarteto de Nos remains chameleonic". Luis Paz from Argentine newspaper Página 12 wrote that "with this album, the band closes a trilogy started by Raro and Bipolar, characterized by the sound power and Roberto Musso's capacity for special and very personal lyrics".

== Track listing ==
All tracks were produced by Juan Campodónico.

Porfiado track listing
No.	Title	Writer(s)	Length
1.	"Algo mejor que hacer"	Roberto Musso	3:21
2.	"Cuando sea grande"	Roberto Musso	4:10
3.	"Sólo estoy sobreviviendo"	Roberto Musso	4:27
4.	"Buen día Benito"	Roberto Musso	3:50
5.	"El lado soleado de la calle"	Roberto Musso	4:10
6.	"Lo malo de ser bueno"	Roberto Musso	4:01
7.	"Enamorado tuyo"	Santiago Tavella	4:20
8.	"El balcón de Paul"	Roberto Musso	3:54
9.	"Vida ingrata"	Roberto Musso	3:58
10.	"No te invité a mi cumpleaños"	Santiago Tavella	4:13
11.	"Insaciable"	Roberto Musso	3:51
12.	"Todos pasan por mi rancho"	Roberto Musso	5:09
Total length:			49:21

== Personnel ==
- Primary Artist - El Cuarteto De Nos
- Composer - Roberto Musso
- Composer - Santiago Tavella

== Charts ==
Chart	Peak position
Uruguayan Albums (CUD)	2
