= Pa' Bailar =

Single by Bajofondo featuring Ryōta Komatsu

from the album Mar Dulce
- Released: August 29, 2007
- Recorded: Buenos Aires, Argentina; L.A., California, USA; Tokyo, Japan
- Genre: Neotango
- Length: 3:59 (album version)
- Label: Universal Music
- Songwriters: Gustavo Santaolalla, Juan Campodónico, Benjamín Tagle Lara, Alfonso Tagle Lara
- Producers: Gustavo Santaolalla, Juan Campodónico [Co] Aníbal Kerpel

Bajofondo singles chronology
| "Pa' Bailar" (2007) | "El Mareo" (2008) |

"Pa' Bailar" is an instrumental neotango song by Bajofondo, and the lead single from their second studio album Mar Dulce. This song features Japanese bandoneonist Ryōta Komatsu. The song is used as the theme of the Brazilian telenovela A Favorita.

== Track list ==
Two editions have been released for the single. The 2007 release includes the album version, two remixes, a remixed version featuring vocals by Fernando Santullo and a (non-electro) tango version covered by Orquesta Los Maestros; the 2008 release includes the same tracks (in different order) plus a version featuring vocals by Mexican singer, composer and accordionist Julieta Venegas. One of the released versions was remixed by Uruguayan DJs and producers duo Omar, an alternate remix by Omar has been released on their MySpace page.

All music is composed by G. Santaolalla, J. Campodónico, B. Tagle Lara, A. Tagle Lara.

2007 download, CD, and vinyl
| No. | Title | Lyrics | Length |
|---|---|---|---|
| 1. | "Pa' Bailar" (album version) | | 3:53 |
| 2. | "Pa' Bailar" (Pa' Bailarte mix by Omar) | | 4:49 |
| 3. | "Pa' Bailar" (feat. Santullo) | F. Santullo | 3:38 |
| 4. | "Pa' Bailar" (Bandido mix by Alexkid) | | 6:27 |
| 5. | "Pa' Bailar" (by Orquesta Los Maestros) | | 2:45 |

2008 download
| No. | Title | Lyrics | Length |
|---|---|---|---|
| 1. | "Pa' Bailar" (album version) | | 3:53 |
| 2. | "Pa' Bailar" (Bandido mix by Alexkid) | | 6:28 |
| 3. | "Pa' Bailar" (Pa' Bailarte mix by Omar) | | 4:49 |
| 4. | "Pa' Bailar (Siempre Quiero Más)" (feat. Julieta Venegas) | | 3:38 |
| 5. | "Pa' Bailar" (feat. Santullo) | F. Santullo | 3:40 |
| 6. | "Pa' Bailar" (by Orquesta Los Maestros) | | 2:45 |

2008 CD
| No. | Title | Lyrics | Length |
|---|---|---|---|
| 1. | "Pa' Bailar" (album version) | | 3:52 |
| 2. | "Pa' Bailar" (Pa' Bailarte mix by Omar) | | 4:49 |
| 3. | "Pa' Bailar (Siempre Quiero Más)" (feat. Julieta Venegas) | | 3:38 |
| 4. | "Pa' Bailar" (Bandido mix by Alexkid) | | 6:28 |
| 5. | "Pa' Bailar" (feat. Santullo) | F. Santullo | 3:39 |
| 6. | "Pa' Bailar" (Pa' Ir Bailando mix by Omar) | | 6:13 |
| 7. | "Pa' Bailar" (by Orquesta Los Maestros) | | 2:45 |

== Music videos ==
Two official videoclips were shot for the single, both promoted on TV. One of the videos is about a man dancing in a train trying to get a woman's attention; he dances all the road and makes different things until everybody starts dancing and the woman joins him. This version was directed by Pablo Casacuberta. The other version was directed by Picky Talarico, it shows a tango and electronic party.

The official videos and a video from a live performance in Poland have been released on the iTunes Store.
