= Loza (surname) =

Loza is a surname with multiple etymologies. Notable people with the surname include:

- Boris Loza (born 1960), Canada-based Russian cybersecurity expert
- Dmitry Loza (1922–2001), Soviet-Ukrainian colonel
- Efrain Loza (1939–2017), Mexican footballer
- Halina Buyno-Łoza (1907–1991), Polish actress
- Jamar Loza (born 1994), Jamaican footballer
- Kyle Loza (born 1986), American freestyle motocross rider
- Melissa Loza, Peruvian model
- Mieczysław Łoza (1916–1982), Polish actor
- Petro Loza (born 1979), Ukrainian Greek-Catholic bishop
- Remedios Loza (1949–2018), Bolivian politician
- Rito Romero Loza (1927–2001), Mexican wrestler
- Rodolfo Loza (born 1933), Argentine boxer
- Santiago Loza (born 1971), Argentine film director
- Stanisław Łoza (1573–1639), Polish Roman Catholic prelate
- Steven Loza (born 1952), American musicologist
- Verónica Loza (born 1973), Uruguayan artist and singer
- Yuri Loza (born 1954), Russian musician
