= Presente (Bajofondo album) =

Studio album by Bajofondo
- Released: March 5, 2013
- Genre: Electrotango
- Length: 79:58
- Label: Sony Music
- Producers: Gustavo Santaolalla, Juan Campodónico

Bajofondo chronology
Mar Dulce (2006)	Presente (2013)	Aura (2019)

Singles from Presente
- 1. "Pide Piso" Released: February 12, 2013; 2. "La Trufa y el Sifón" Released: March 5, 2013

Presente (English: Present) is the fourth studio album by the Río de la Plata-based music band Bajofondo released on March 5, 2013, through Sony Music. The album was produced by Bajofondo members, Gustavo Santaolalla and Juan Campodónico, and features arrangements by Alejandro Terán.

At the 14th Annual Latin Grammy Awards, the album won Best Instrumental Album and was nominated for Album of the Year, the song "Pena en mi Corazón" won Best Alternative Song. The album also received a nomination for Best Instrumental/Fusion/World Music Album at the Gardel Awards of 2014 while the song "Lluvia" was nominated for Best Music Video.

== Singles ==
The songs "Pide Piso" and "La Trufa y el Sifón" were released as singles for the album on February 12, 2013, and March 5, 2013, respectively.

== Track listing ==
All tracks are produced by Gustavo Santaolalla and Juan Campodónico and written by Bajofondo (Adrián Sosa, Gabriel Casacuberta, Gustavo Santaolalla, Juan Campodónico, Javier Casalla, Luciano Supervielle, Martín Ferrés, Verónica Loza), except where noted.

No.	Title	Writer(s)	Length
1.	"Intro"		1:46
2.	"Codigo de Barra"	Bajofondo, Eduardo Rovira, Romeo Gavioli	3:02
3.	"Segundos Afuera"	Bajofondo, Rovira	3:45
4.	"Pide Piso"	Bajofondo, Atilio Supparo, Salvador Merico	5:24
5.	"Nocturno"		3:33
6.	"Pena en mi Corazón"		5:17
7.	"Caminante"		4:07
8.	"El Tifón y el Sifón"		4:12
9.	"Sabelo"		4:38
10.	"Patras"	Bajofondo, Rovira	4:38
11.	"Oigo Voces"		2:18
12.	"Cuesta Arriba"		4:24
13.	"Rendezvous"		4:24
14.	"Lluvia"	Bajofondo, Fernando Santullo	5:07
15.	"Noviembre"		1:50
16.	"Circular"	Bajofondo, Martín Rivero, Roberto Musso	4:55
17.	"A Repechaje"		4:11
18.	"Milongon"	Bajofondo, Enrique Mario Francini, Homero Expósito, Héctor Stamponi	2:51
19.	"Asi es (Propergol)"		3:56
20.	"Olvidate"	Bajofondo, Luis Garutti	3:52
21.	"Outro"		1:48
Total length:			79:58

== Credits and personnel ==
Adapted from TIDAL.

=== Musicians ===
- Gustavo Santaolalla – production (all tracks), songwriting (all tracks), electric guitar (1, 2, 3, 4, 6, 7, 8, 9, 12, 17, 18, 19, 20, 21), guitar (4, 9, 14), acoustic guitar (5, 6, 13), cymbal (5), keyboards (6), organ (6), tambourine (6), vocals (6, 11, 16, 19), background vocals (12, 14), drums (14)
- Juan Campodónico – production (all tracks), songwriting (all tracks), guitar (2, 3, 4, 8, 14, 17, 18, 19, 20), electric guitar (8), background vocals (12, 16, 19), vocals (14)
- Adrián Sosa – songwriting (all tracks), drums (2, 3, 4, 5, 6, 7, 8, 9, 10, 12, 14, 16, 17, 18, 19, 20), background vocals (6, 16, 19), bass (8), synthesizer (8, 20), acoustic guitar (12), electric guitar (12), vocals (12, 20)
- Gabriel Casacuberta – songwriting (all tracks), bass (2, 3, 4, 5, 9, 13, 17, 18), background vocals (6, 12, 16, 19), bass guitar (16, 19), glockenspiel (19), harp (19), keyboards (19), vocals (20)
- Javier Casalla – songwriting (all tracks), violin (1, 3, 4, 5, 6, 7, 8, 9, 10, 12, 13, 14, 16, 17, 18, 20), guitar (7), drums (13), background vocals (16, 19), vocals (20)
- Luciano Supervielle – songwriting (all tracks), piano (2, 3, 4, 5, 6, 7, 8, 9, 10, 12, 13, 16, 17, 18, 20), background vocals (6, 12, 16, 19), synthesizer (9), vocals (20)
- Martín Ferrés – songwriting (all tracks), bandoneon (1, 3, 4, 5, 6, 7, 8, 9, 10, 12, 13, 14, 15, 17,19, 20), bass (15), guitar (15), background vocals (16, 19), vocals (20)
- Verónica Loza – songwriting (all tracks), background vocals (6, 12, 16)
- Eduardo Rovira – songwriting (2, 3, 10)
- Romeo Gavioli – songwriting (2)
- Atilio Supparo – songwriting (4)
- Salvador Merico – songwriting (4)
- Fernando Santullo – songwriting (14)
- Martín Rivero – songwriting (16)
- Roberto Musso – songwriting (16)
- Enrique Mario Francini – songwriting (18)
- Homero Expósito – songwriting (18)
- Héctor Stamponi – songwriting (18)
- Luis Garutti – songwriting (20)
- Alejandro Terán – arranger (all tracks), conductor (1, 2)
- Aníbal Kerpel – co-production (all tracks), bass (6), synthesizer (6)

=== Technical ===
- Aníbal Kerpel – recording engineer (all tracks)
- Jorge Chiccarelli – recording engineer (all tracks)
- Jorge "Portugues" Da Silva – recording engineer (all tracks)
- Julio Berta – recording engineer (all tracks)
