= Mar dulce =

Studio album by Bajofondo
- Released: September 3, 2007; July 15, 2008 (reissue)
- Recorded: Buenos Aires, Argentina; L.A., California, US; NYC, New York, US; Tokyo, Japan; Montevideo, Uruguay; Madrid, Spain
- Genres: Neotango, electronica, trip-hop, rock en español, hip hop
- Languages: Spanish, English
- Label: Surco Records
- Producers: Gustavo Santaolalla, Juan Campodónico

Bajofondo chronology
| Remixed (2006) | Mar dulce (2007) | Presente (2013) |

Professional ratings
Review scores
| Source | Rating |
|---|---|
| AllMusic | 4/5 stars |

Mar dulce is an album by the Argentine/Uruguayan tango fusion band, Bajofondo.

The album was recorded in Buenos Aires, Argentina, In the first phase, double bass, violin, bandoneon, guitar and piano were recorded, then strings orchestra under the direction of Alejandro Terán. Later, acoustic drums were recorded in Los Angeles. Different guest artists recorded their parts in New York City, Los Angeles, Tokyo, Montevideo and Madrid.

Guest artists on this release are Nelly Furtado, Julieta Venegas, Lágrima Ríos (performing her last record in lifetime "Chiquilines" written specially for her by Gustavo Santaolalla), Gustavo Cerati, Mala Rodríguez, Fernando Santullo (former member of Peyote Asesino), Juan Subirá (member of Bersuit Vergarabat, with a song written by himself) and the Japanese bandoneonist Ryōta Komatsu collaborating on the album's first single, "Pa' Bailar".

== Track lists ==
2007 edition
| No. | Title | Guest artist [feat.] | Length |
|---|---|---|---|
| 1. | "Grand Guignol" | | 5:04 |
| 2. | "Cristal" | | 5:27 |
| 3. | "Ya no duele" | Santullo | 3:43 |
| 4. | "Hoy" | Juan Subirá | 5:13 |
| 5. | "Pa' Bailar" | Ryōta Komatsu | 3:59 |
| 6. | "Pulmón" | | 3:21 |
| 7. | "Fairly Right" | Elvis Costello | 6:02 |
| 8. | "El mareo" | Gustavo Cerati | 4:35 |
| 9. | "El andén" | Mala Rodríguez | 3:50 |
| 10. | "Infiltrado" | | 3:39 |
| 11. | "Borges y Paraguay" | | 4:32 |
| 12. | "Tuve sol" | | 3:53 |
| 13. | "No pregunto cuántos son" | | 4:50 |
| 14. | "Slippery Sidewalks" | Nelly Furtado | 3:33 |
| 15. | "Zitarrosa" | | 4:04 |
| 16. | "Chiquilines" | Lágrima Ríos | 5:51 |

2008 edition
| No. | Title | Guest artist [feat.] | Length |
|---|---|---|---|
| 1. | "Grand Guignol" | | 5:04 |
| 2. | "Cristal" | | 5:27 |
| 3. | "Ya no duele" | Santullo | 3:43 |
| 4. | "Hoy" | Juan Subirá | 5:14 |
| 5. | "Pa' bailar" | Ryōta Komatsu | 3:59 |
| 6. | "Pulmón" | | 3:21 |
| 7. | "Fairly Right" | Elvis Costello | 6:02 |
| 8. | "El mareo" | Gustavo Cerati | 4:35 |
| 9. | "El andén" | Mala Rodríguez | 3:50 |
| 10. | "Infiltrado" | | 3:39 |
| 11. | "Borges y Paraguay" | | 4:32 |
| 12. | "Tuve sol" | | 3:53 |
| 13. | "No pregunto cuántos son" | | 4:50 |
| 14. | "Baldosas mojadas" ( (Note: Spanish version for "Slippery Sidewalks".)) | Nelly Furtado | 3:33 |
| 15. | "Zitarrosa" | | 4:04 |
| 16. | "Chiquilines" | Lágrima Ríos | 5:53 |
| 17. | "Pa' Bailar (Siempre Quiero Más)" | Julieta Venegas | 3:37 |

iTunes bonus tracks
| No. | Title | Guest artist [feat.] | Length |
|---|---|---|---|
| 18. | "Fairly Right" ( (Note: Alternative version without Elvis Costello; Gustavo Santaolalla performed vocals instead.)) | | 6:01 |
| 19. | "Slippery Sidewalks" | Nelly Furtado | 3:32 |
