= Andrés Torrón =

Uruguayan musician, writer and producer

- Born: Andrés Torrón Preobrayensky; Montevideo, Uruguay
- Known for: musician, writer, music producer, music journalist

Andrés Torrón (Montevideo) is an Uruguayan musician, writer, cultural journalist, and music producer. He is the author of the book 111 Discos Uruguayos and has worked as a producer, arranger, and guitarist with various Uruguayan and international artists. He is a member of the musical project Dos, alongside his daughter, Lucía Torrón.

== Biography ==
Torrón studied guitar, harmony, and composition with Gustavo Ripa, Esteban Klisich, and Coriún Aharonián. In the 1980s, he co-founded the underground magazine Tranvías & Buzones. In the early 1990s, he formed the band Públicas Virtudes, which released the album Basura Contemporánea in 1993.

In 1995, he began working as a music journalist for the Uruguayan weekly newspaper Brecha. He has since contributed to various Uruguayan media outlets like la siaria, El País Cultural, Dossier, Bla, Montevideo Portal, and El Observador; as well as to international magazines such as Relix, Global Rhythm, and Todavía.

== Music ==
Since the early 2000s, Torrón has been active in artistic production. His first work as a producer was the album De donde querés venir mañana (2003) by the Uruguayan group La Saga.

In 2004, Andrés Torrón was featured as a guest guitarist on Jorge Drexler's album Eco in the song "Don de Fluir."

In 2008, he co-composed the original music for the play Cascanueces, directed by Martín Inthamoussu, together with Paola Dalto. That same year, he collaborated with Uruguayan musician Nico Arnicho on his album Confesiones, co-writing the track "Al Karnaval" with Dalto and Arnicho, and producing a remix of the track "De salida".

Since 2010, Torrón has collaborated with the Japanese record label Rambling Records on various music productions targeting the Asian market. In 2012, he produced the album Sol de Bossa, released in Japan, which received significant attention.

In 2014, he served as executive producer for Fernando Santullo's album El mar sin miedo. He also contributed as a guitarist on the track "El arma" and produced a remix of the song "Pedalear", which was included in the digital album El mar sin ruido (2015).

=== Dos ===
In 2017, Torrón and his daughter Lucía formed the duo Dos and released the EP Demasiado tarde. The duo released the single Ascensores in 2019 and the EP Música para fin de fiesta in 2024.

== Books ==
In 2014, Torrón published 111 Discos Uruguayos (Aguaclara ), an art book that covers nearly six decades of Uruguayan music through 111 albums. The book became a local and international reference work. It earned a Special Jury Mention at the 2015 Graffiti Awards. In 2020, it was reissued with an expanded version titled 111 + 11 Discos Uruguayos, which included 11 additional albums.

In 2019, he published Mediocampo (Estuario Editora), an essay focused on the 1984 album by Jaime Roos of the same name. He also wrote liner notes for the vinyl reissues of Roos' albums Aquello, Siempre son las cuatro, and Mediocampo.

Torrón also wrote liner notes and essays for various Uruguayan albums, like the acclaimed compilation América Invertida.

== Other projects ==
Torrón worked in the documentary Amigo lindo del alma (2019), about Eduardo Mateo, directed by Daniel Charlone. Torrón conducted interviews with Mateo's contemporaries featured in the film.

In 2023, he co-created the exhibition La milonga es hija del candombe así como el tango es hijo de la milonga with Juan Campodónico, which ran at the SODRE's National Archive from October 2023 to April 2024. The exhibition is currently touring in a reduced version.

Torrón received the Legión del Libro award from the Uruguayan Book Chamber and a Special Award at the Graffiti Awards. He was also nominated for the Premios Bartolomé Hidalgo.
