= Soraya Moraes =

Brazilian gospel singer (born 1973)

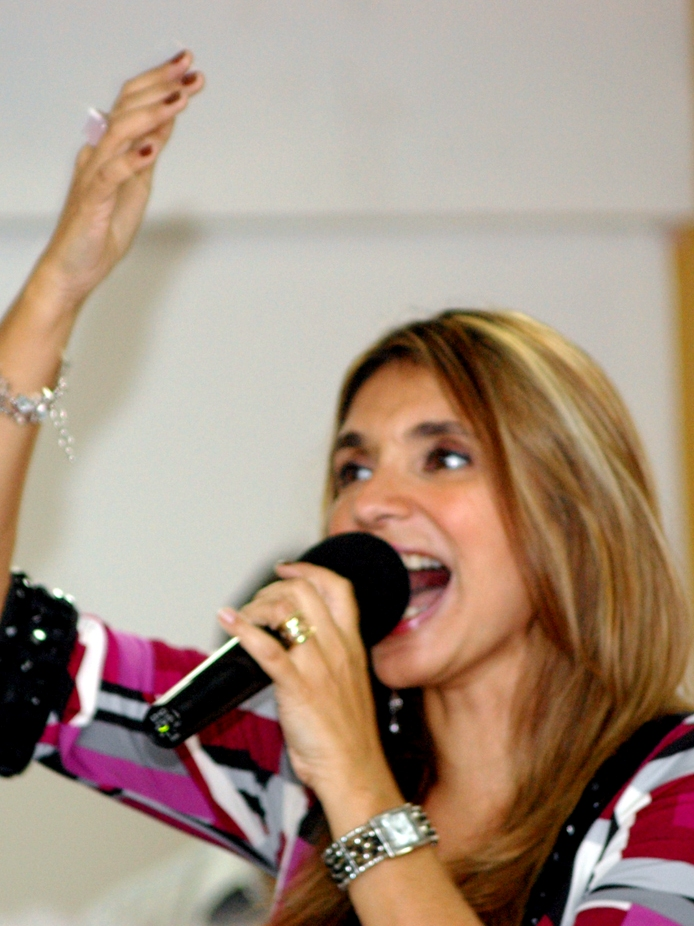

Background information
- Born: January 29, 1973 (age 53); São Paulo
- Genres: Christian
- Years active: 1992 - Present
- Website: www.sorayamoraes.com.br

Soraya Moraes (born January 29, 1973) is a Brazilian gospel singer.

Moraes was born in São Paulo and sang in church as a child. Her professional career began in a band called Metanoya in 1992; their debut album, Guerra, was released in 1993. In 1998, she signed with Gospel Records as a solo artist, and her debut, Pensando em Deus, was released in 1999. Her 2004 release Deixa o Teu Rio Me Levar was awarded a Latin Grammy in 2007 for best Portuguese language Christian album. She also won four Troféu Talento awards. Moraes is a member of the Foursquare Church.

== Awards ==
- Latin Grammy Awards of 2008 - Best Christian Album (Spanish Language) with Tengo Sed de Tí
- Latin Grammy Awards of 2008 - Best Christian Album (Portuguese Language) with Som da chuva (Line Records)
- Latin Grammy Awards of 2008 - Best Brazilian Song with "Som da Chuva"
- Latin Grammy Awards of 2005 - Best Christian Album (Portuguese Language) with Deixa o Teu Rio me Levar (Line Records)

== Discography ==
=== Albums ===
Year	Album	Label	Sales
1999	Pensando em Deus	Gospel Records	—
2000	Milagre	Gospel Records	100,000
2001	Te Adoramos	Gospel Records	100,000
2003	Presença de Deus	Gospel Records	100,000
2004	Deixa o Teu Rio Me Levar	Line Records	150,000
2005	Tudo é possível	Gospel Records	100,000
2006	Promessa	Line Records	100,000
2008	Som da Chuva	Line Records	200,000
2009	Grande é o meu Deus	Line Records	350,000
2011	Minha Esperança	Graça Music	150,000
2013	Céu na Terra	Sony Music	20,000
2016	Shekinah	Sony Music	5,000

=== Extended plays ===
Year	Album	Label	Sales
2018	Caminho no Deserto	Central Gospel Music	5,000

=== International ===
Year	Album	Label
2008	Tengo Sed de Tí	Line Records

=== Collections ===
Year	Album	Label
2002	10 Anos	Gospel Records
2007	Deus Que Cura	Line Records
2010	Seleção de Ouro	Line Records
2011	As melhores de Soraya Moraes	Line Records
