= Tengo Sed de Ti =

Studio album by Soraya Moraes
- Released: 2008
- Genre: CCM

Soraya Moraes chronology
| Deus Que Cura (2007) | Tengo Sed de Ti (2008) |

Tengo Sed de Ti is a Spanish album released by Brazilian Christian music singer Soraya Moraes.

== Track listing ==
1. "Tengo Sed de Ti"
2. "Estoy Listo"
3. "Tus Altares"
4. "Nube de Gloria"
5. "Me Alegro En El Señor"
6. "Tempo de Celebración"
7. "Brazos de Amor"
8. "Nuevo Corazón"
9. "Tócame"

== Awards ==
Tengo Sed de Ti won a Grammy Award for Best Christian Album in Spanish Language at the Latin Grammy Awards of 2008. The album was also nominated to a Dove Award for Spanish Language Album of the Year at the 40th GMA Dove Awards.
