= Ryōta Komatsu =

Japanese bandoneón player (born 1973)

Ryōta Komatsu 小松亮太
- Born: October 30, 1973 (age 52); Tokyo, Japan
- Genres: Tango
- Instrument: Bandoneón
- Label: Sony Music Japan
- Website: ryotakomatsu.net

Ryōta Komatsu (小松亮太, Komatsu Ryōta) (born October 30, 1973) is a Japanese bandoneón player. He has collaborated with Japanese violinist Taro Hakase in his own album La Trampera (2001), and with Bajofondo in their album Mar Dulce.
