= Pasión Española =

Studio album by Plácido Domingo
- Released: 2008
- Label: Deutsche Grammophon

Plácido Domingo chronology
| Gitano (2007) | Pasión Española (2008) | Plácido Domingo: Amore Infinito (2008) |

Pasión Española is a 2008 album by Plácido Domingo with Miguel Roa and the Madrid Community Orchestra from Deutsche Grammophon which won a Latin Grammy Award.

== Track listing ==
1. "Falsa Moneda" – Juan Mostazo Morales
2. "La Cruz De Mayo" – Manuel Font De Anta
3. "La Bien Pagá" – Juan Mostazo Morales
4. "Porque Te Quiero" – Genaro Monreal Lacosta
5. "El Día Que Nací Yo" – Juan Mostazo Morales*
6. "¡Ay, Maricruz!" – Manuel López-Quiroga Miquel
7. "Me Embrujaste" – Manuel López-Quiroga Miquel
8. "Cariño Verdá" – Genaro Monreal Lacosta*
9. "Te Lo Juro Yo" – Manuel López-Quiroga Miquel
10. "¡No Me Quieras Tanto!" – Manuel López-Quiroga Miquel
11. "Antonio Vargas Heredia" – Francisco Merenciano Bosch, Juan Mostazo Morales*
12. "Ojos Verdes" – Manuel López-Quiroga Miquel
13. "Suspiros De España" – Antonio Álvarez Alonso
