= Boris Loza =

International computer security expert (born 1960)

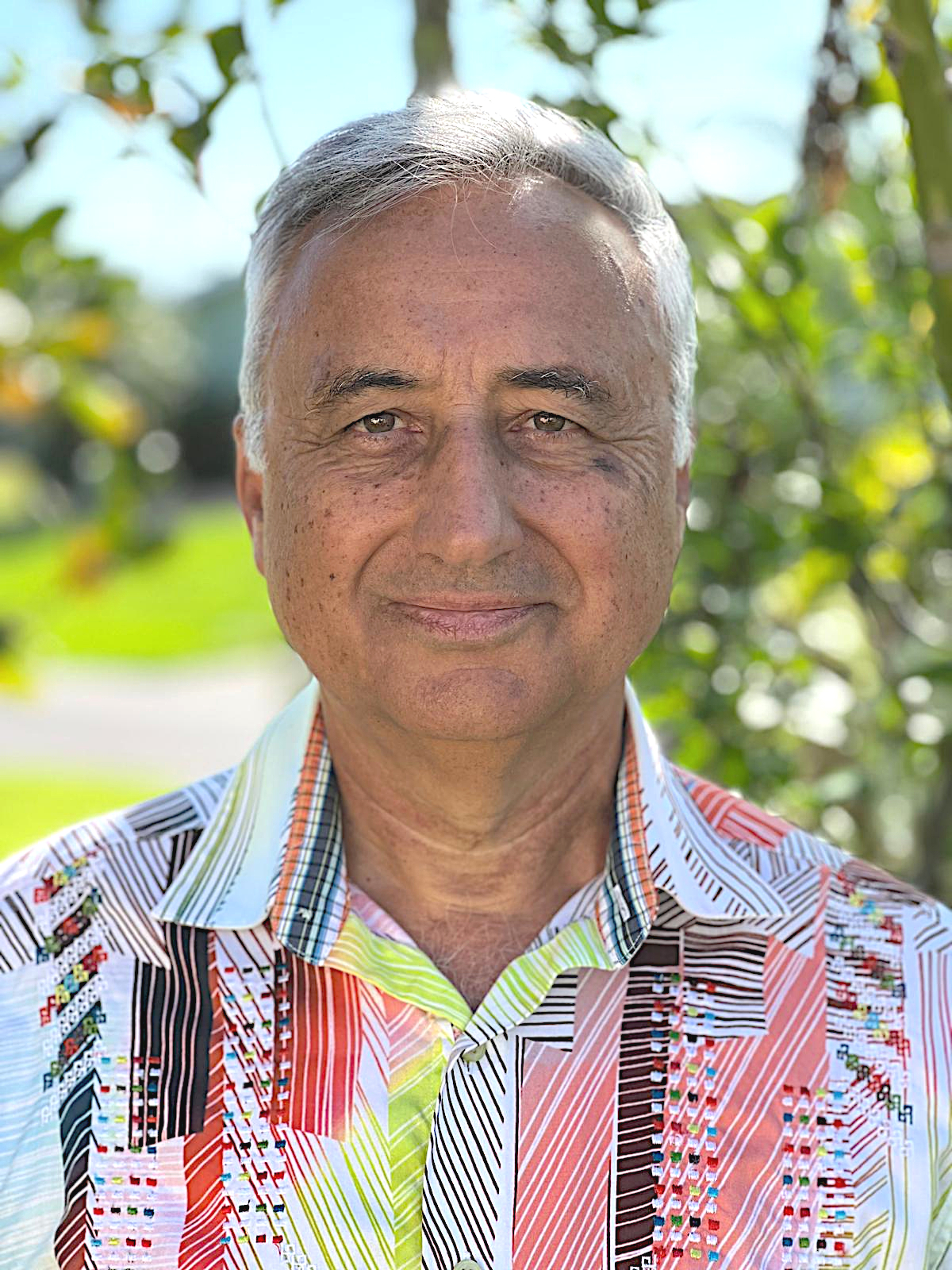
- Born: May 5, 1960 (age 66); Krasnodar, Russia
- Education: Kuban State Technological University (MS, PhD)
- Occupations: Information Systems Security Professional, Professor of AI and Cybersecurity

Boris Loza (May 5, 1960) is a Russian born academic, professor, dissertation chair, and author. He is a Certified Information Systems Security Professional (CISSP). Since 2019 he works as a professor of AI and cybersecurity.

== Early life and education ==
Loza was born in Krasnodar, Russia, the former Soviet Union, in 1960, the son of a history schoolteacher and an agricultural engineer.

Loza studied computer science at the Kuban State Technological University and graduated in 1982 with a Master of Science in automation. In 1989, he received his PhD in automation and chemistry for the study of implementing automatic controllers in chemical processes.

== Research and career ==
Loza is a certified Information Systems Security Professional (CISSP) who has worked for IBM Global Services as a Senior System Administrator and for Fidelity Investments as a Principal Information Systems Security Specialist.

In 2004, Loza published a book titled "UNIX, Solaris and Linux: A Practical Security Cookbook: Securing UNIX Operating Systems without Third-Party Application."

Since 2019, Loza works as a cybersecurity and AI professor, first at Seneca Polytechnic (Canada) (received academic tenure) and later both at Capitol Technology University (USA) and Wilmington University (USA) (adjunct professor).

Since 2024, Loza works as a doctoral advisor, external examiner, dissertation committee member and a subject matter expert at Capitol Technology University and Wilmington University.

Loza's interest in computer security has led him to continue developing products as well as to publish articles and a book. His articles have been featured in hacker's magazines, such as the "original" Phrack and 2600: The Hacker Quarterly. He has contributed over 40 articles to US industry magazines, such as Usenix ;login:, SysAdmin, Inside Solaris, Inside the Internet, and several others.

As a speaker, author and teacher, Loza has worked for and consulted Fortune and Global 500 companies, including IBM, AT&T and Fidelity Investments, as well as government agencies and start-ups.

His research in information security has been cited in several books, including Information Security: The Complete Reference, Second Edition, DTrace: Dynamic Tracing in Oracle Solaris, Mac OS X, and FreeBSD, BPF Performance Tools, UNIX: The Complete Reference, Second Edition, Hack Proofing Sun Solaris 8, among others.

Some of the computer security products developed by Loza, by himself as well as with co-authors, are HackerProof–external vulnerability scanning software and a standalone device as well a website certification service, External, Internal and Mobile SafePatrol-a computer security system used by both personal and corporate systems and TrackDrive – remote hard drive erasing app.

Loza has contributed over 40 articles to US industry magazines, such as USENIX, SysAdmin, Inside Solaris, Sun and several others. His work, both in Russian and English, has been translated into several languages, including French, Czech and German.

Loza acts as a subject matter expert in courts. He has filed and received several Information Security patents in the US, and has conducted hundreds of information security assessments, security forensics, penetration tests and white hacking assessments.

== Awards and honors ==
In 2008, Boris Loza was internationally recognized for his work and contribution to the field of Computer Security Awareness. He was a winner of the first international Cyber Security Awareness Contest, held by (ISC)² for the series of articles on information security awareness.

== Publications ==
Loza has authored a number of books and scientific articles in journals. His published books include:

- UNIX, Solaris and Linux: A Practical Security Cookbook: Securing UNIX Operating Systems without Third-Party Application
- North Caucasus Dolmens: In Search of Wonders
- В поисках необычного. Рассказы о путешествиях (Russian Edition)
