= El Cuarteto de Nos =

Uruguayan rock band

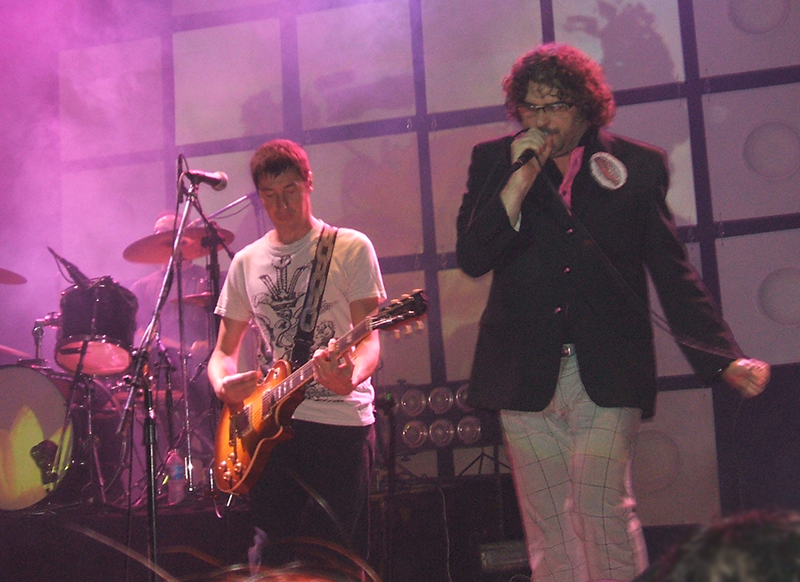
- El Cuarteto de Nos performing in Buenos Aires, Argentina, in 2008

Background information
- Origin: Montevideo, Uruguay
- Genres: Rock; alternative rock; comedy rock; rap rock
- Years active: 1980–present
- Labels: Warner; Orfeo; Sony BMG; Koala; Manzana Verde; Bizarro
- Members: Roberto Musso; Álvaro Pintos; Gustavo Antuña; Santiago Marrero; Luis Angelero
- Past members: Ricardo Musso; Santiago Tavella; Andres Bedo; Leonardo Baroncini
- Website: cuartetodenos.com.uy

El Cuarteto de Nos (stylized as Cuarteto de Nos) is an Uruguayan rock band formed in 1980 in Montevideo. Over the years, due to its particular sound that mixes elements of hip hop/rap, alternative rock, comedy rock and Latin music, the group has developed an immense amount of popularity and praise in Latin America and Hispanic countries, like Argentina, Uruguay, Spain, México, and others, with big concerts on those countries. The band won two Latin Grammy Awards in 2012 for Best Pop/Rock Album and Best Rock Song.

El Cuarteto de Nos has released 18 studio albums since 1984, as well as two compilation albums on numerous record labels, including Ayuí/Tacuabé, Orfeo, Sony BMG, Koala Records, Manzana Verde, Bizarro Records, EMI, and Warner Music. They have experimented with many genres, and are one of the most important and recognized bands from Uruguay and Latin America in general. They've had five/six lineups with the current one standing since 2024 with the departure of bassist Santiago Tavella.

== History ==
=== Beginnings ===
During the Uruguayan Dictatorship, the idea for El Cuarteto de Nos was founded by brothers Roberto Musso (vocals and guitars) and Ricardo "Riki" Musso (guitars and keyboards) in 1980. They played with the idea of a fictional city called "Tajo", writing songs about the characters therein.

Bassist Santiago Tavella was recruited as a long-time friend who, just like them, was an enormous fan of artists like The Beatles, Bob Dylan and Led Zeppelin. Leonardo Baroncini would serve as a guest drummer until Álvaro Pintos joined in 1984. Keyboardist Andres Bedó was also a fifth official member during the first two albums. Together, they played rock covers until they started developing their own material in university.

==== Emergence as El Cuarteto ====
El Cuarteto de Nos played their first show in 1984, an instrumental set in the "El Tinglado" theater. They also played at the "La Máscara", "El Circular", "Teatro de la Alianza Francesa" theaters while developing their own musical style. Their first release, Alberto Wolf y el Cuarteto de Nos, was a split album released later that year in November shared with another Uruguayan artist, Alberto Wolf, who had six of the twelve songs. Álvaro Pintos joined the group as a permanent drummer following its release. They would keep this quartet lineup for 18 years until Riki Musso departed in 2009 due to creative differences.

In 1985, they stepped on a stage, located in a fair from Villa Biarritz, dressed up with aluminum foil on their legs and balloons tied to their heads.

In 1986, they edited their first LP, Soy una Arveja (transl. I am a Pea). The following year, band members dressed up as elderly women to promote the song "Soy una Vieja" (transl. "I am an Old Lady"). Soy una Arveja incorporated more electric guitars and surreal lyrics than in their album with Wolf, with many elements of new wave and Avant-garde music. They made references to the fictional city of Tajo and used their characters to apply a comedic or humorous lens on serious topics, such as sex, greed, and death.

In 1988, their second album, Emilio García (by then, the fictional manager), was released. Andrés Bedó was no longer listed as a band member after this release.

In 1991, the album Canciones del Corazón (transl. Songs from the Heart) was released in cassette, and it was the first moderate commercial success for the band.

In 1994, after four years of working on new songs, they released their album Otra Navidad en las Trincheras (transl. "Another Christmas in the Trenches"), which achieved quadruple platinum status almost instantly, making them the first Uruguayan band ever to achieve it. They became well known in Uruguay, no longer an underground cult band. Mocking their success, they called their 1995 album Barranca abajo (transl. "Downhill").

In late 1996, El Cuarteto de Nos released their seventh album El Tren Bala (transl. "The Bullet Train"). This album was controversial in Uruguay, since one of its songs, "El día que Artigas se emborrachó" (transl. "The Day Artigas Got Drunk"), references José Gervasio Artigas, the founding father of Uruguay. Attempts were made to ban the song, delaying the release of the album. Because of the diversity of musical styles presented, the record was well received, and it became a gold record in a week, despite the censorship it received after the controversy.

The popularity of the band started to decline in mid-1997 when they were working on their eighth studio album, Revista ¡¡Ésta!! (transl. "This one!! Magazine"), which was released in 1998 to lukewarm sales and reception, which extended to their 2000 decade opener Cortamambo (transl. "Killjoy"), an album that gained a cult following over the years despite not being successful upon release. This album also resulted in Riki Musso leaving the group for most of 2001, due to issues he had with the album's creative direction. In 2004, the band recorded their best songs from every album to date with a better, more consistent production achieved by Juan Campodónico, a long time fan of the group.

In 2004, they released El Cuarteto de Nos, a compilation album of their all-time hits played and recorded again, plus three new songs, called "Hay que comer" (transl. "We Have to Eat"), "No quiero ser normal" (transl. "I Don't Want to Be Normal") and "Fui yo" (transl. "It Was Me"), the album was made in a more rocker style and had a coherent production.

=== 2006–2013: Raro Trilogy ===
==== A new formula with Raro ====
El Cuarteto de Nos released Raro (strange or weird in English) on May 20, 2006, as a departure from their previous work. Song lyrics were extended and sped up through the use of rap, hip-hop, and pop elements. The single "Yendo a la casa de Damián" (transl. "Going to Damian's House") was nominated for a Latin Grammy in 2007 in the "Best Rock Song" category. The band promoted their new album at several Latin American stages such as Rock al Parque 2007 in Bogotá, Colombia and the Pepsi Music 2008 festival in Buenos Aires, Argentina.

Raro was the first of three albums described as the Raro trilogy (with the other two being Bipolar and Porfiado), where the band would experiment with different musical styles, lyrics, and themes. Raro and the rest of the trilogy marked a turning point for the band, leading to a surge in popularity in South America. Throughout the trilogy, Tavella would sing the lead vocals on two tracks on each album, serving as a break that juxtaposed Roberto Musso's fast and energetic lyrics.

==== Departing of Ricardo Musso and the releasing of Bipolar ====
On May 27, 2009, in the midst of the development of their album Bipolar, it was reported that Ricardo Musso had artistic and administrative differences with the course the band had taken. Majareta Productions, announced that the band would not split, but would undergo structural change. With the departure of Ricardo Musso, two new musicians had joined the band, replacing Musso's guitar, Gustavo Antuña and the keyboardist Santiago Marrero. Finally, after many setbacks, the album was released in September 2009. This album was well received, winning five Graffiti Awards in June 2010.

==== Closure with Porfiado ====
The final entry of the Raro trilogy, Porfiado (transl. "Obstinate") was released on April 25, 2012, through Warner Music in South America, Mexico, and Spain. It was the first album the group released as a quintet following Ricardo Musso's replacement by Antuña and Marrero. The album was well received, being praised by the Argentine edition of Rolling Stone and Página 12.

Porfiado won the band several Latin Grammy Awards in 2012. The album won the "Best Pop/Rock Album" category, with "Cuando sea Grande" (transl. "When I Grow Up") winning best rock song.

=== 2014–Present: Newfound Success ===
El Cuarteto de Nos released Habla tu Espejo (transl. "Your Mirror is Talking") in 2014. The album was much more serious and touched on darker themes than their previous work. It was particularly personal for vocalist Roberto Musso, touching on his family history of Alzeheimers, how to quell a child's fears, and self-doubt. The album was nominated for two Latin Grammys in 2015.

Apocalipsis Zombi (transl. "Zombie Apocalypse") released in 2017 and dove deeper into the pop-side of Latin rock. Originally a concept album, the songs drew from the common theme of zombies walking among society, or that society as a whole was populated with zombies and attempted to create an energetic and fun tone.

Their final album of the 2010s, Jueves (transl. "Thursday"), released in 2019. There were many producers on the album: Juan Campodónico (Raro and others), Eduardo Cabra (Calle 13), Héctor Castillo (No Te Va Gustar), and Camilo Lara. Similarly, Musso went about writing the songs as "independent elements" rather than as pieces of an album.

Lámina Once (transl. "Plate Eleven"), released in 2022. The album's name comes from the Rorschach test, used to describe an individual's personality from unclear or ambiguous shapes. The group described the COVID-19 pandemic as a major inspiration for the album as they felt they were missing an eleventh inkblot plate to make sense of pandemic society, as Rorschach tests only consist of ten plates. At just shy of 33 minutes, it is the shortest album of their discography.

==== Departing of Santiago Tavella ====
On March 13, 2024, in the midst of their Lámina Once tour the band announced that bassist Santiago Tavella would no longer be a member of the band due to him focusing on different projects such as his own band Otro Tavella y los Embajadores del Buen Gusto and general tiredness with the constant touring of the band.

== Members ==
Current members

- Roberto Musso – principal vocalist and rhythmic guitars, also leader (1980–present)
- Álvaro Pintos – drums, percusion and chorus (1985–present)
- Gustavo Antuña – principal guitarist and chorus (2009–present)
- Santiago Marrero – keyboards, bass, chorist (2009–present)

No oficial members

- Luis Angelero – rhythmic guitar and chorus (2019-present) and bass guitar (2024–present). Not in all shows 2019-2023.

Previous members

- Ricardo Musso – principal guitar and vocals (1984–2009)
- Santiago Tavella – bass guitar and vocals (1984–2024)
- Andrés Bedo – keyboards (1984–1988)
- Leonardo Baroncini – drums (1983-1985)
- Guzmán Villamonte - drums (1980-1981)
- Unknown(s) - drums (1982-1983)

== Discography ==
Studio albums

- Alberto Wolf y El Cuarteto de Nos (1984)
- Soy una Arveja (1987)
- Emilio García (1988)
- Canciones del Corazón (1991)
- Otra Navidad en las Trincheras (1994)
- Barranca Abajo (1995)
- El Tren Bala (1996)
- Revista ¡¡Ésta!! (1998)
- Cortamambo (2000)
- El Cuarteto de Nos (2004)
- Raro (2006)
- Bipolar (2009)
- Porfiado (2012)
- Habla Tu Espejo (2014)
- Apocalipsis Zombi (2017)
- Jueves (2019)
- Lámina Once (2022)
- Puertas (2025)
