= Un día más en el gran circo =

Un Día Más En El Gran Circo

Studio album by Jeremías
- Released: 14 August 2007
- Recorded: 2007
- Genre: Pop, rock

Jeremías chronology
Ese Que Va Por Ahí (2006)	Un Día Más En El Gran Circo (2007)

Un Día Más En El Gran Circo is the 3rd album by British-Venezuelan singer-songwriter Jeremías released on 14 August 2007. The album earned a Latin Grammy Award nomination for Best Male Pop Vocal Album.

== Track listing ==
1. Un Día Más En El Gran Circo
2. Juan de Afuera
3. El Simple Juego del Amor
4. Hasta El Próximo Invierno
5. Este Tiempo Que Se Fue
6. El Seductor
7. Nada Fuera de Control
8. Yo No Busco Nada Más
9. Promesa de Amor
10. Comienzo del Final
11. Aire de Abril
12. De Regreso a La Soledad
13. Tú
14. Un Días Más En El Gran Circo (Reprise)
15. Tú (Versión Alternativa)
