= Lágrima Ríos =

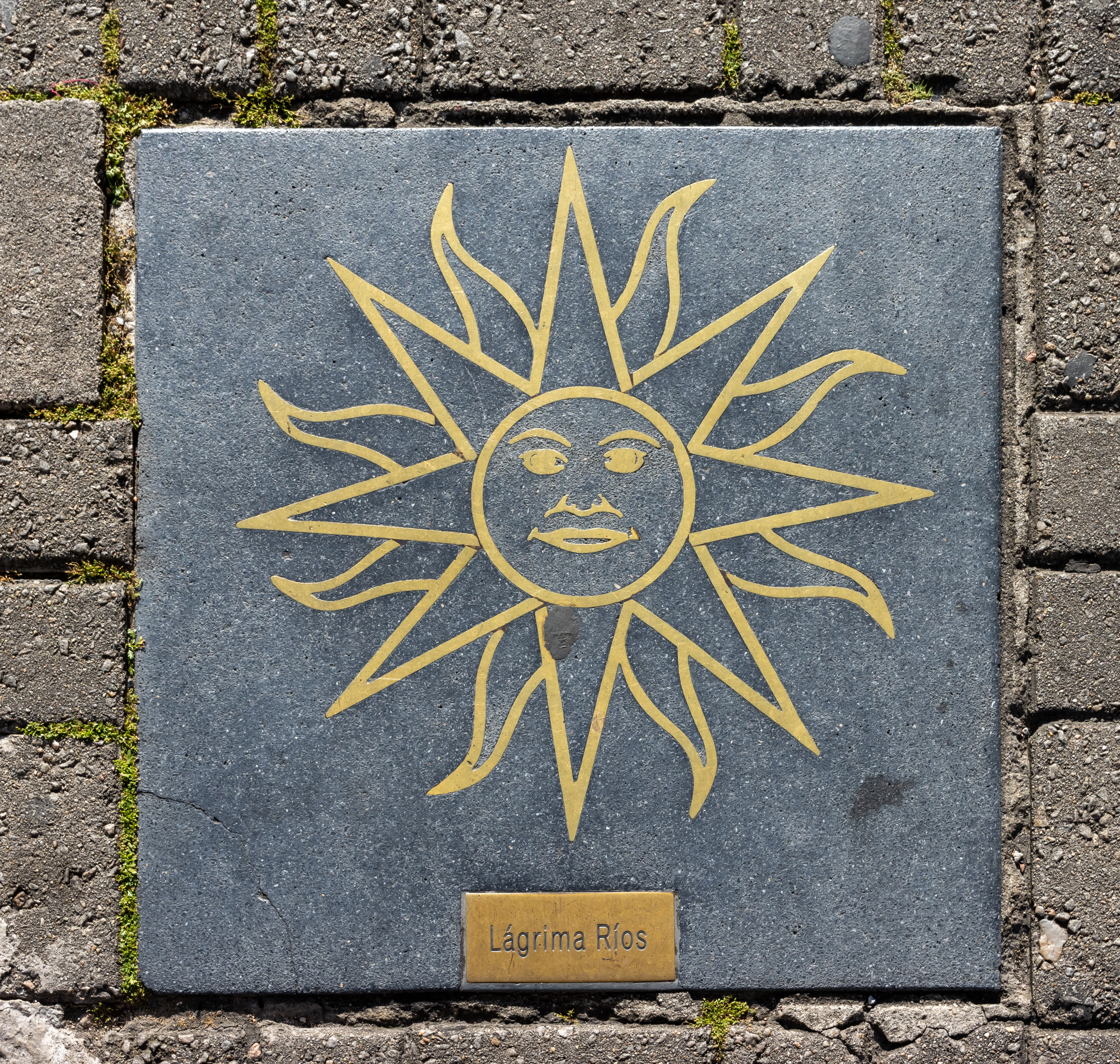
Plaque at the Suns of the Paseo de los Soles, Montevideo, Uruguay

Lágrima Ríos was the stage name of Lida Melba Benavídez Tabárez (Durazno, September 26, 1924 – Montevideo, December 25, 2006), a prominent candombe and tango singer of Afro-Uruguayan descent. Her voice was powerful and she is also known as the "Black Pearl of the Tango" and the "Lady of Candombe". Her rendition of Vieja viola was listed in the book 1001 Songs you must hear before you die (London, 2010).

== Origin of her artistic name ==
Alberto Mastra, her teacher, before integrating her into one of her famous trios, told her:

"We are going to change your name, you can pick between Armonía or Lágrima. She picked Lágrima, because tears are not always sad; the greatest joys can also make us cry. This afternoon, in her house on Durazno street, to the South, the tears came as she remembered her mother, with the devotion that only a child raised in a loving home can show. In the years of Lida del Río first and the years of Lágrima Ríos that followed, she embodied the feminine voice of the candombe."

== Biography ==
Lida Benavídez was born in Durazno, Uruguay, in a modest house at 61 Baltasar Brum Street that can still be seen today. She was born on September 26, 1924, according to her biography, but her birth certificate states that she was born October 8 of the same year (the certificate also claims that she was actually born in a house on Ituzaingó Street in Durazno).

When she was born, her mother was fifteen years old even though the birth certificate says that she was sixteen. Lágrima never knew her father, but was close with her maternal grandparents. The grandmother, regardless of her poverty, helped her teenage daughter raise a young Lágrima. Lágrima's grandmother came to Uruguay with a group of slaves that escaped from Brazil and came to Uruguay by means of the Yaguaró River. Lágrima would describe her grandmother as a woman who would "cut through the bad with scissors". When her grandparents moved to Montevideo, they taught different styles of dance to other blacks. Her grandmother would live to be 89 years old.

As a child, Lágrima Ríos lived in extreme poverty. However, in spite of her lack of money and comforts, even in her childhood she knew she wanted to be a dancer. When she was very young, her mother left the city of Durazno and they lived in many different places in the capital city. They moved places often as her mother accepted whatever work she could. While growing up, Lágrima would listen to the music that played on the radios of her neighbors while her mother worked as a housemaid, a cook, and as a laundress. Lágrima would memorize the music and the lyrics and then sing and dance along with the music. Lágrima later related that, at three years old, she fell in love with singing through listening to the records in the houses her mother worked in.

Lágrima first worked as a housemaid. The house that she worked in had a radio through which she could listen to the music. She listened to music from every class of people and committed the lyrics to memory. The piano that was in the house dazzled her, and she learned how to tune it and, eventually, how to play. Lágrima later worked as a cook for an ambassador of the United States; through this she became familiar with the blues and other American styles of music that she learned to sing with power and emotion.

Lágrima had a son from her first marriage and named him Eduardo. He was Tupamaros militant that spent 30 years in Sweden as an exile.

== Professional career ==
Her breakthrough as a singer came in 1956, when she won a singing competition organised by the newspaper La Tribuna Popular and the CX24 radio station. She adopted the stage name "Lágrima Ríos" and went on to sing with a number of well-known bands.

She died in Montevideo at the age of 82.
