= Jeremías =

Venezuelan singer and songwriter (born 1973)

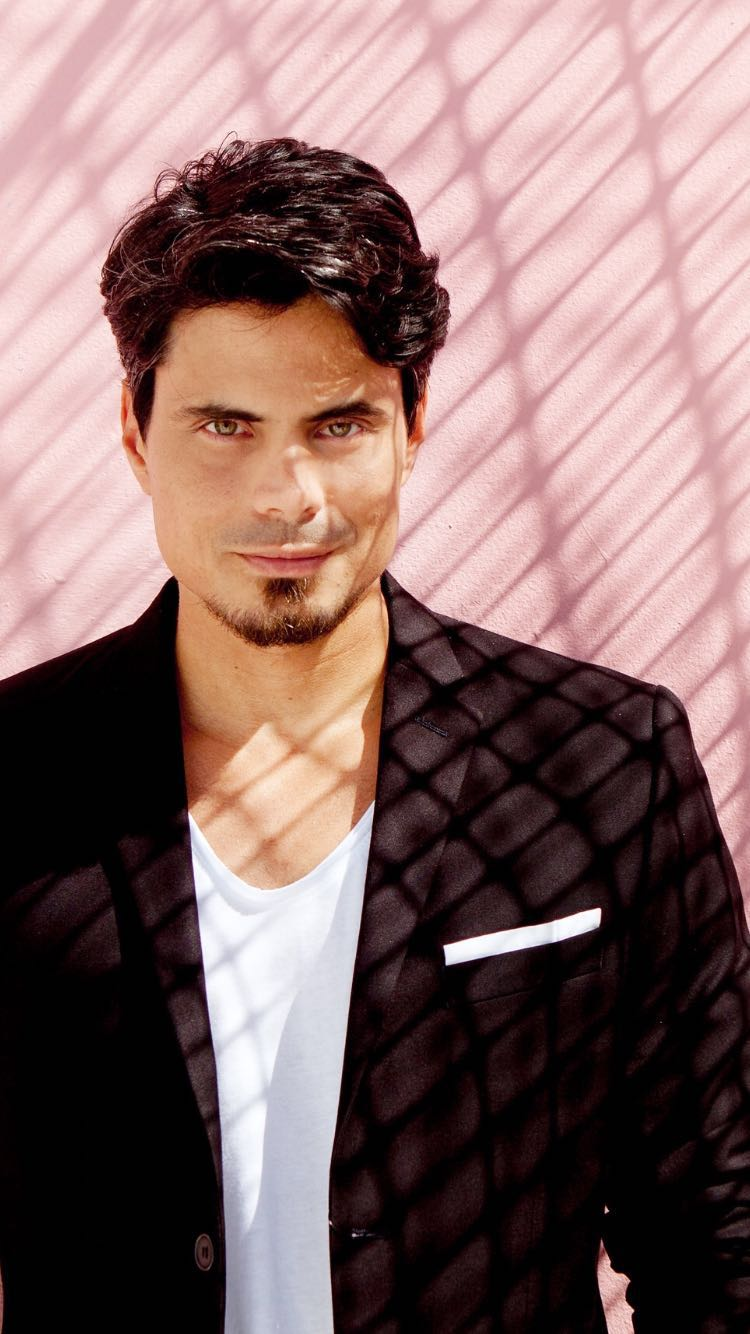

Background information
- Born: Carlos Eduardo López Ávila; September 19, 1973 (age 52); London, United Kingdom
- Origin: Venezuela
- Genres: Rock
- Occupation: Singer-songwriter
- Labels: Avila, Universal Latino

Carlos Eduardo Lopez Avila (born September 19, 1973, London) is a Venezuelan singer and songwriter, better known as Jeremias. His songs include a wide spectrum of genres, including pop, ballads and tropical music; all infused with romantic lyric that reflect human emotions, Latino culture and love.

== Biography ==
Jeremías was born in London, where his parents were studying, and moved with his family to Venezuela when he was just two-years-old. He grew up moving around some of the country's biggest cities, including Caracas, Maracay, and Puerto Ordaz. At 7, Jeremias started collecting music, while learning to play the guitar.

Literature was his chosen career path with the onslaught of college, but he switched his major halfway through college to Psychology, but finally settled on his life's greatest vocation: music.

He claims that songwriting allows him to fuse the lyricism capabilities he discovered in Literature, with the understanding of the dynamics of human behavior and emotions he delved into while studying psychology.

The singer and his girlfriend welcomed their first child, a girl named Sofía, on August 23, 2017.

== Career ==
His career ensued at the age of 23. Dead set on songwriting exclusively, Jeremias began recording demos to show to record label and music executives in the hopes of selling songs. Instead he showcased his vocals so well that they recommended he sing his own songs.

Jeremías launched his singing career in 2002 and promoted most of first singles in Spain, where he made appearances on major television programs like Crónicas marcianas and Música Sí.

In 2003 Jeremias released his self-titled album, Jeremías, which included songs like "La Cita" and "Desde el bar." The songs became top-charting hits and transcended to successful performances and appearances. The song "Poco a Poco" became a record-breaking single chosen as the main soundtrack for a popular Venezuelan soap opera, Mi Gorda Bella.

In 2005 he settled in Miami, and in 2006 released Ese Que Va Por Ahí, an album with both critical acclaim and resounding success in the United States, Latin America and Puerto Rico. That same year Jeremias was the only Latino artist ranked among Billboard Magazine's coveted "Who's Hot" list. The songs "Uno y uno es igual a tres" and "Hay un amor afuera" reached the top of Latin play list charts in both the US and Latin America.

In 2008 he recorded his third album Un día más en el gran circo, and the album's singles "El comienzo del final" and "Tú" rank number one on Latin music charts. The songs' music videos garner equal success, with top-rotating music videos on HTV. The album earned him a Grammy nomination for Best Male Pop Album, and he closed the award show with a performance along Juanes, Belinda, Rosario, Pedro Carmona and Tommy Torres.

In 2016, Jeremías returned to Caracas and began working on his fourth album, with the Julca Brothers and Motiff as producers. The singer/songwriter is poised to release the album in early 2017 and plans to launch the first single toward the end of 2016.

Sources:

- Jeremías (2002) – edited and released in Spain.
- The song "La Cita" ranked no. 4 on radio play in Spain.
- The song "Desde el bar" reached no. 1 on radio play in Spain.
- Successful promotions and concerts throughout Spain.
- He travels to Miami in 2005 to sign a record deal with Universal Music for a new album.
- He released Ese Que Va Por Ahí.
- In 2006 he receives a nomination in Premios MTV for "Best new artist".
- The songs "Uno y uno es igual a tres" and "Hay un amor afuera" become radio hits.
- In 2008 he releases his third album Un día más en el gran circo, which includes two number one hits: "El comienzo del final" and Tú."
- He receives a Latin Grammy nomination for Best Male Pop Album and closes that year's ceremony.
- In 2016 Jeremías ensued production on his fourth album, which he is poised to release early in 2017. He's poised to release the first single toward the end of 2016.

== Discography ==
- Jeremías (2003)
- Ese Que Va Por Ahí (2006)
- Un Día Más En El Gran Circo (2007)

== Awards and nominations ==
- In 2006 he receives a nomination in Premios MTV for "Best new artist".
- In 2008 he receives a Latin Grammy nomination for "Best Male Pop Album".

== See also ==
- Venezuelan music
