= Roberto Musso =

Uruguayan singer and guitarist (born 1961)

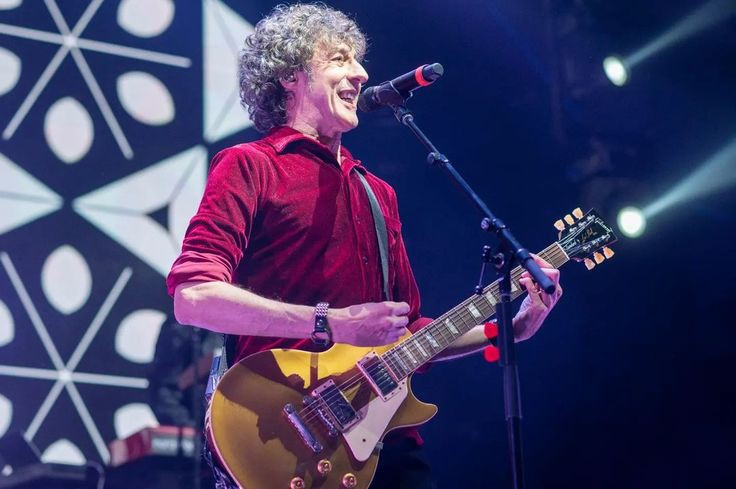
- Musso in 2020
- Born: Roberto Daniel Musso Focaccio; November 21, 1961 (age 64); Montevideo, Uruguay
- Occupations: Singer; songwriter; television personality; systems engineer
- Years active: 1978–present
- Spouse: Laura Domínguez (m. 1995)
- Children: 1
- Musical career
- Genres: Pop; rock
- Instruments: Vocals; guitar
- Labels: Ayuí; Orfeo; BMG; EMI; Bizarro; Warner; Sony Music; Porfiado
- Member of: El Cuarteto de Nos

Roberto Daniel Musso Focaccio (born November 21, 1961) is a Uruguayan singer-songwriter, musician and television personality who is the lead vocalist and guitarist of the rock band El Cuarteto de Nos.

== Early life ==
Roberto Daniel Musso Focaccio was born on November 21, 1961, in Montevideo, to Roberto Musso, an architect and professor at the University of the Republic, and Orita Focaccio, an office clerk. Both of his parents were of Italian descent. He is the fourth generation of men named Roberto in his paternal family. He has two siblings, Ricardo "Riki" and Marcela.

He grew up in the Palermo neighborhood of Montevideo and attended Elbio Fernández School. In 1979, he enrolled at the University of the Republic, where he graduated with a degree in systems engineering in 1990. He worked at the Ministry of Foreign Relations and, in 1994, joined the state-owned oil company ANCAP.

== Career ==
In the 1970s, while growing up in Montevideo, Musso and his brother Ricardo "Riki" Musso created an imaginary city called "Tajo". They populated the fictional city with characters who would later inspire some of the songs they wrote. Having learned to play musical instruments, the brothers decided to form a band and invited their friend Santiago Tavella to play bass.

Musso and his bandmates initially composed instrumental music without lyrics. Inspired by a concert by Uruguayan musician Leo Maslíah, they began incorporating lyrics into their songs, often characterized by dark humor. The group performed with several guest drummers before meeting Álvaro Pintos, who became its first permanent drummer. They initially played at friends' fifteenth-birthday parties and at the university, using various experimental names, before formally adopting the name El Cuarteto de Nos in 1978.

The group later began working with the independent record label Ayuí / Tacuabé. Their early performances included appearances in high-school band competitions, while their first performance as an established group took place at a festival in Parque Villa Biarritz, in Punta Carretas, in 1985.

== Personal life ==
In 1995, Musso married Laura Domínguez, with whom he has a daughter, Federica.
