= El Peyote Asesino =

Uruguayan rock band

- Origin: Montevideo, Uruguay
- Genres: Rapcore
- Years active: 1994–1999; 2009; 2016–2017; 2020–present
- Labels: Orfeo; Universal Music Group; Bizarro Records
- Members: Fernando Santullo; Daniel Benia; Juan Campodónico; Pepe Canedo; Carlos Casacuberta; Bruno Tortorella; Matías Rada
- Past members: Roberto Rodino; Luciano Supervielle
- Website: Website

El Peyote Asesino (English: "The Killer Peyote") is a Uruguayan rock band formed in 1994 (Note: The band's formation year is erroneously credited to the mid-1980s in AllMusic.) in the Villa Española neighborhood of Montevideo. It is made up of Fernando Santullo — credited as "L. Mental" — and Carlos Casacuberta on vocals, Daniel Benia on bass, Juan Campodónico on guitar, Bruno Tortorella on keyboards, Matías Rada on guitar and Pepe Canedo on drums. Its style combines heavy metal, funk, and rap, something that was atypical in the Uruguayan rock scene at that time.

They made their debut in 1995, with the release of their self-titled album El Peyote Asesino, produced by Gabriel Casacuberta, Carlos' brother. This album had a good impact in the Montevidean underground movement, where it sold 1,000 copies, being the best-selling Uruguayan rock album during the first months of 1996.

In September 1997 they began recording their second LP at Can Am studios in Los Angeles. Terraja was released on 31 August 1998 under the Universal Music Group label. In addition to maintaining the rap metal style of its predecessor, Terraja experiments with multiple genres such as electronic music, soul, milonga, candombe, and tango. The most popular song on the album is "Mal de la Cabeza". A year after the release of Terraja, the band temporarily broke up.

In 2009, they met for a performance at the Pilsen Rock festival, on 4 and 5 November at the Teatro de Verano in Montevideo; however, no studio work was carried out.

After twenty-three years of inactivity, Serial was released on 5 November 2021. A year before, a new single called "Vos No Me Llamaste" was published, and in the same year that Serial was released, they published two new songs: "La Tumba de los Crá" and "Es lo que Hay". The album was produced by Campodónico, the band's guitarist.

== History ==
=== First years and El Peyote Asesino (1994–1997) ===
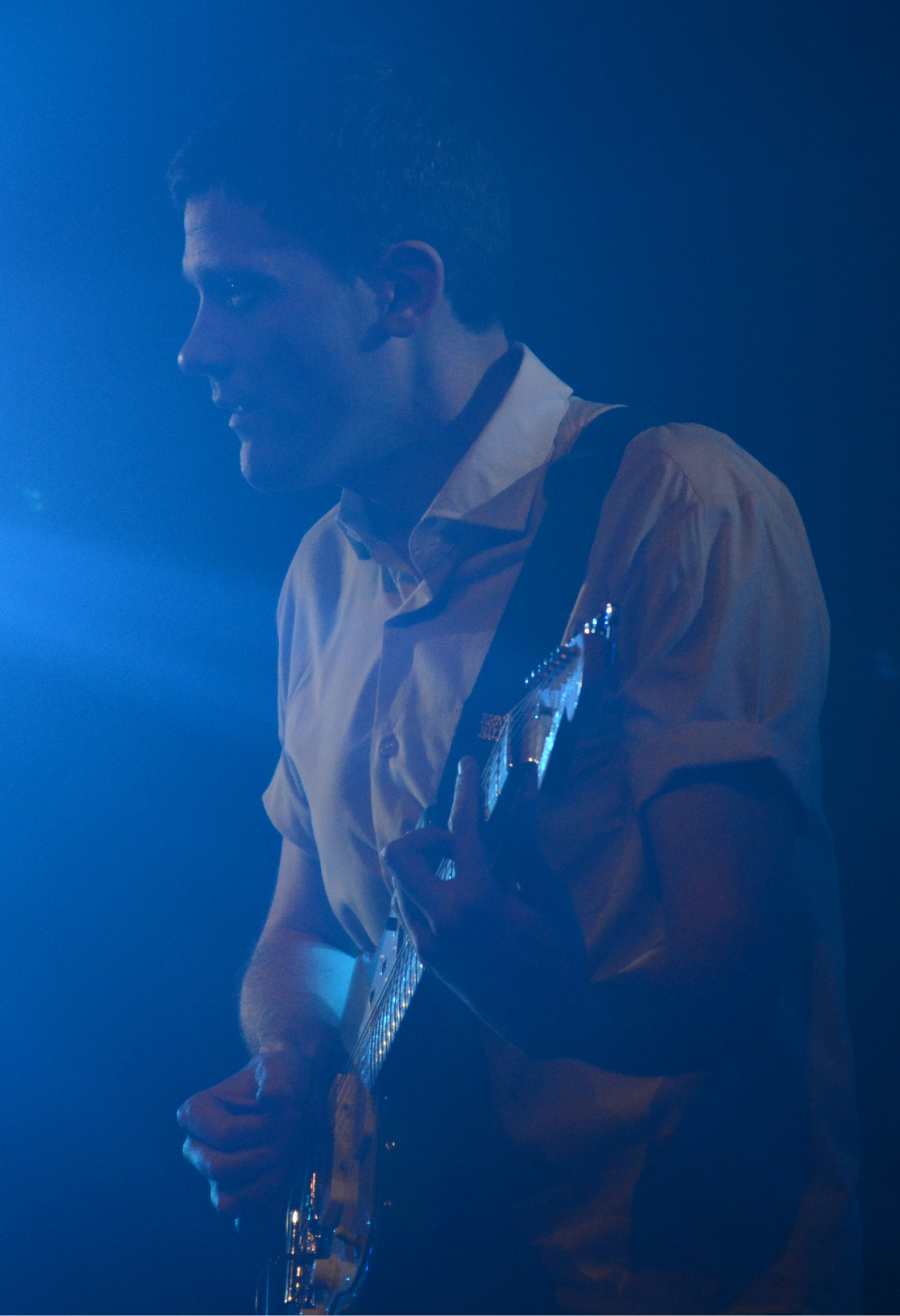
Juan Campodónico, one of the founders of El Peyote Asesino

El Peyote Asesino was formed at late 1994 by Fernando Santullo and Juan Campodónico. The band's original lineup was Santullo (credited as "L. Mental") and Carlos Casacuberta on vocals, Daniel Benia on bass, Juan Campodónico on guitar, and Roberto Rodino on drums. They debuted on 28 August of that same year at the now-defunct "El perro azul" pub. Already for their second performance, at Big Bang, the band was complete. Pepe Canedo joined on drums, replacing Rodino, and Casacuberta on voice and guitar. That presence would be followed by others such as the La Movida Young Art Meeting and several in the Montevideo underground movement. In November 1994, they presented a demo in the "Generación 95" contest sponsored by "Rock de Primera", a supplement of the newspaper Últimas Noticias, "Control Remote", a rock program on Channel 10, and X FM 100.3, being declared winners by the jury, and whose reward was hours to be able to record an album. This opened the possibility of making their first album, which would be recorded between the months of July to October 1995 at the Estudio del Cordón. Their sound engineer at that time was Luis Restuccia. Santullo commented: "Sometimes I would say “I want my voice to sound a little more rotten,” and suddenly I would say “rotten” to Luis and he would imagine something that had a bad smell, but Gabriel, since he had listened to the Beastie Boys, acted as a link."

In December 1995 they released their first studio album under the Orfeo label, El Peyote Asesino. This would make it the best-selling rock album in Uruguay during the first months of 1996. Meanwhile, the group multiplied its live activities, playing with various local bands. In January 1996, they were voted by the readers of Rock de Primera, with a significant margin, "National rock revelation group in 1995." The band made their first video, choosing the song "L. Mental", being broadcast on different open and cable TV channels. In June, the song "El Peyote Asesino" enters the list of the 10 best on X FM, reaching number 1 on 18 June, where it remained for two weeks. In August, they performed in Buenos Aires, Argentina, at the Rojas Cultural Center, together with the Mexican rap metal bands Molotov and Tintoreros. The person who organized this cycle is also Uruguayan, based in Buenos Aires, Fabián Jara. Jara was in charge of organizing it in the Ricardo Rojas room, belonging to the Argentine university circuit and which has previously hosted Buitres After La Una. "This is the first time this has happened to us, since in Montevideo the spectators watch our shows standing up and many of them pogo and dance", said Casacuberta.

=== Debut album ===
In December 1995 their first album El Peyote Asesino was launched (Orfeo). Gabriel Casacuberta (brother of Carlos Casacuberta) and Luis Restuccia were the ones in charge of the production of this album. This album sold over a thousand copies, which made it the highest selling rock album in Uruguay, during the first months of 1996. Meanwhile, the group increased their live performances and started coming out of the Montevideo underground scene. On January of 1996 the band filmed its first video, L. Mental, which spread throughout most of the local TV stations. El Peyote Asesino, the most known track of the album, got a place in the top ten singles of X FM, reaching the first spot in only 18 days.

=== Terraja ===
During the month of September the band starts recording their second album, Terraja, in the Can Am Recorders studio, in Los Angeles, California. Once they finished recording it, they went on tour with the Mexican bands Molotov and Control Machete, playing in many parts of Mexico. Terraja was finally edited in August 1998, in different countries such as Mexico, Argentina, Uruguay, Puerto Rico and the United States. The band returned to Argentina, one month after the album was edited, to perform along with Molotov, Cypress Hill, Bersuit Vergarabat, and Árbol. Later that month, they played in Uruguay for the last time along with Plátano Macho and Molotov, before they split up for several years.

=== Reunion and Serial ===
Ten years after their split up, they performed live at the Pilsen Rock festival, playing for 80 thousand people, and shortly after in the Teatro de Verano.

In 2016 they once again performed in the Teatro de Verano on the nights of 12 and 13 May. Although Carlos Casacuberta was not able to play due to health problems, guest Matías Rada filled Casacuberta's role while Bruno Tortorella played the keyboard. Since 2016, Rada and Tortorella are stable members of the group. In November 2021, the band released Serial, their third album. It was composed and recorded between 2019 and 2020 in Montevideo. It contains ten songs, and was recorded by Julio Berta and produced by Juan Campodónico. "This work sums up the artistic maturation of the group very well. It shows in everything, in the music, in the lyrics. I think it is the best of the three albums that Peyote has released", Gustavo Santaolalla, producer of Terraja in 1997, said about Serial.
