= Luciano Supervielle =

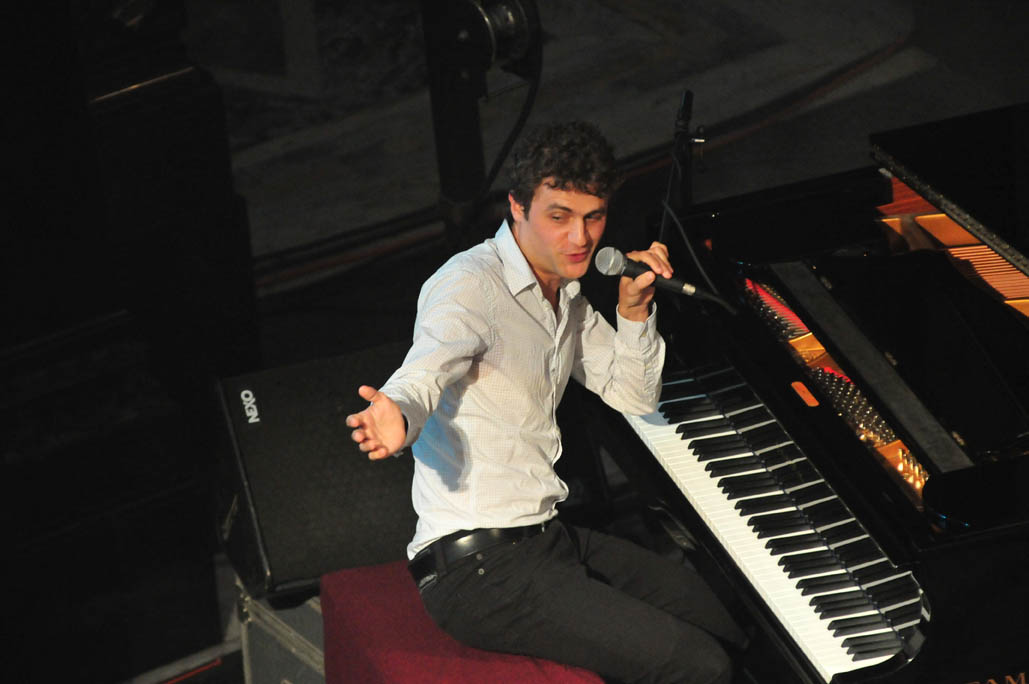
- Supervielle performing in 2011

Background information
- Birth name: Luciano Supervielle Sbruzzi
- Born: 30 October 1976 (age 48); Paris, France
- Origin: Montevideo, Uruguay
- Genres: Electronic
- Occupation(s): Musician, composer, producer, DJ
- Instrument(s): Piano, keyboard
- Years active: 1997–present
- Labels: Sony, Universal

Luciano Supervielle Sbruzzi (born 30 October 1976) is a French-born Uruguayan musician, composer, producer and DJ. Aside from his solo work, he is also known for being part of the neotango collective Bajofondo.

== Records ==
- Bajofondo presenta Supervielle (2005)
- Supervielle en el Solís DVD (2008)
- Rêverie (2011)
- Suite para piano y pulso velado (2016)
