= Bajofondo =

Argentinean-Uruguayan musical band

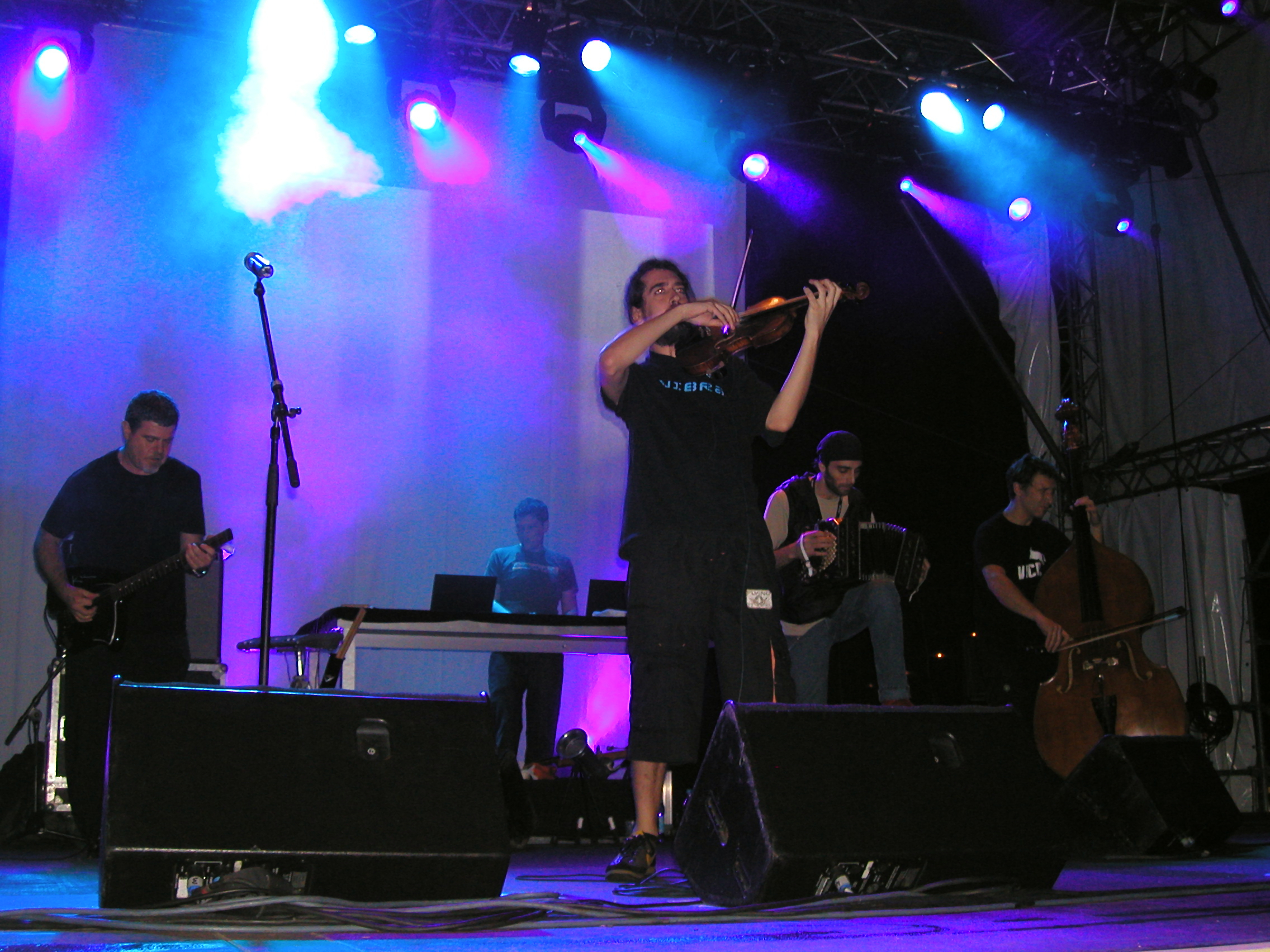
- Bajofondo in 2006

Background information
- Also known as: Bajofondo Tango Club
- Origin: Argentina/Uruguay
- Genres: Neotango, electronica, tango, candombe, milonga
- Years active: 2002–present
- Labels: Universal Music Latin, Sony Masterworks
- Members: Gustavo Santaolalla; Juan Campodónico; Luciano Supervielle; Martín Ferrés; Verónica Loza; Javier Casalla; Gabriel Casacuberta; Adrián Sosa
- Website: www.bajofondomusic.com

Bajofondo is a Río de la Plata-based music band consisting of eight musicians from Argentina and Uruguay, which aims to create a more contemporary version of tango and other musical styles of the Río de la Plata region. It was founded in the early 2000s as a studio experiment, which culminated into the successful album Bajofondo Tango Club. This led to touring and eventually to the current lineup. Bajofondo calls itself a collaborative as all members have solo careers as well. The group has toured around the world, particularly in Latin America, the United States, Europe and parts of Asia. Their music is known to a wider audience than those who know their name as their music has been used in film and television.

== Concept ==
The name alludes to the river that separates Argentina and Uruguay politically but unites the area as a region, called Rio de la Plata. The music has been called “electrotango” or “electronic tango” but leader Gustavo Santaolalla does not believe that it sufficiently describes the group's sound, stating there is more than that. Tango is an influence but it not the band's style.

The Argentine-Uruguayan influence is more than just tango, and includes murga, milonga and candombe. The idea of the group is to take these traditional styles and create something more contemporary, with elements from rock, hip hop, jazz and electronic music, especially sampling.

Bajofondo calls itself a collective, rather than a band, where members work on both projects under the Bajofondo name and on individual projects, often in collaboration with one or more other members. There are eight members, seven musicians and one VJ, who gives a theatrical aspect to live performances, by adding digital images in real time to the music. Each member has their own solo career, and lives in different places. Two of its members, drummer Adrian Nicolas Sosa and producer-composer Gustavo Santaolalla, live in Los Angeles. Four more are in Uruguay, and two are in Argentina. In addition, on most albums, the group has collaborated with other artists including Elvis Costello, Nelly Furtado, Julieta Venegas, La Mala Rodriguez, and Gustavo Cerati.

== History ==
The idea for the group was that of Gustavo Santaolalla in the early 2000s, with the idea of experimenting with the acoustic instrumentation of tango music, with electronic beats and other influences in order to create a more contemporary music of the Río de la Plata region. Santaolalla had already been working with Juan Campodónico on other projects and together they began experimenting in the studio, trying out different sounds, sampling and playing instruments themselves along with participation from friends. After two years of work, the first album, self-titled Bajofondo Tango Club was released in 2002. The album introduced their new style along with the participations of guest artists such as Jorge Drexler, Adriana Varela, Cristóbal Repetto, Adrián Iaies, Didi Gutman, and Pablo Mainetti. The album reached triple platinum and won Argentina's Gardel Prize and a Latin Grammy (Best Instrumental Pop Album) . The popularity of this album encouraged the formation of most of the permanent group and touring. In their first shows, about seventy percent was pre-programmed with thirty percent live. Today only ten percent of what is heard is pre-recorded.

Since then, six other albums have been made, either with the entire collective or with individuals with collective support, such as Luciano Supervielle's solo album in 2004, produced by Santaolalla and Campodónico. This was followed by Bajofondo Remixed in 2005, with reworked versions of songs from Bajofondo Tango Club and Supervielle's album.

In 2008, the album Mar Dulce was released and the name of the group shorted to just Bajofondo, as the idea was not just tango music as the base but all styles of Rio de la Plata regional music, such as milonga and candombe. In 2013, the Presente album has no guest vocals and strings play a more major role with eleven violins, four violas, three cellos and three stand-up basses. This album won the Latin Grammy for best instrumental album.

They have toured around the world particularly in Latin America, the United States, Europe and parts of Asia. Venues include music festival including Coachella in the United States, Womad in England, Festival Internacional Cervantino in Mexico, Cactus Festival in Belgium, Pirineos Sur Festival in Spain, Pohoda in Slovakia, World Music Festival in South Korea, Summer State in New York City and Glastonbury. Other major venues and appearances include the 2010 appearance at the Disney Concert Hall in Los Angeles with the Orchestra of the Americas, the University of California Los Angeles, the Lincoln Center in New York, the Barbicon Center and Roundhouse in London and in 2009 they were part of the opening of Argentina's bicentennial festivities.

Their music is more widely known to the public then the members individually and even the group in total. One reason for this is that their music appears often in television and film than on radio, because it adapts to the first two mediums better. The song Pa’ bailar was used as the theme for the Brazilian soap A Favorita (TV Globo), and the same song for an Acura commercial for the Super Bowl. Other examples include commercials for Kahlua, Macy's and Shell. Warner Cable used Pa’ bailar for a trailer for the series Nikita in 2011 and the Russian gymnastics team used several of their works for the 2012 Olympic Games.

== Members ==
Bajofondo current lineup has eight artists.

Gustavo Santaolalla, cofounder of Bajofondo, is a singer, composer, producer and plays guitar, charango and ronroco and lives in Los Angeles. He also is the director of a record label and publishing company. His career began at age 16 with the band Arco Iris, a pioneer in fusing Latin American folk music and rock. He played with Soluna and then with Wet Picnic after he moved to the United States. His solo career includes three albums. He has been a producer since the 1970s, working with Leon Gieco, G.I.T. and Divididos, along with Maldita Vecindad and Café Tacuba. In 1997 he cofounded the record label SURCO, whose first release was Mexican band Molotov, along with Bersuit, La Vela Puerca, Julieta Venegas and more. Santaolalla has also composed soundtracks for films such as The Insider, Amores Perros, 21 Grams, Brokeback Mountain and Babel. This work has earned him a BAFTA, a Golden Globe and two Oscars. He has also won fourteen Grammys of various types.

Juan Campodónico is the other cofounder of Bajofondo and does programming, beats, samples and guitar. Campodónico is from Uruguay but grew up in Mexico after his parents were exiled, returning in 1984. Soon after he was a member of several rock and pop bands and has been a pioneer of electronic music. In the mid-1990s he formed the band Peyote Asesino, the first Uruguayan band to fuse hip-hop with contemporary rock. This work attracted the attention of Santaolalla, producing the band's second album and giving them international exposure. The band broke up soon after but Campodónico continued to work with Santasolalla, eventually creating Bajofondo, which continuing with his own projects and working as a DJ under the name of Campo.

Luciano Supervielle does piano, keyboards and scratch. Born in France, Supervielle developed his music career in Uruguay, synthesizing hip hop, tango, rock and Uruguayan folk in a way that takes advantage of his abilities on keyboards and turntables. He began his career with the hip-hop group Plátano Macho then began working with Jorge Drexler, participating in four albums and a DVD. He is the youngest member of Bajofondo and has released two solo projects while a member.

Javier Casalla is a violinist who has played with various ensembles in rock, tango, folk, jazzo and classical. In addition to Bajofondo, he collaborates with the bands of Cristobal Repetto and Lucianco Supervielle. He released a solo album in 2006(produced by Santaolalla) and participated in the production of soundtracks for various films.

Martin Ferres is a bandoneon player who plays both traditional and avant garde music and his work is influenced by minimalism as well as tango classics. In addition to Bajofondo, he composes music for theater and dance, and has been heard in many of Argentina's main theaters.

Gabriel Casacuberta plays upright bass and electric back, beginning his career as a session musician in Mexico but working with many Uruguayan artists. After returning to his home country, he played in a number of bands, including Plátano Maco with Supervielle. He has also produced music for movies and television.

Adrian Nicolas Sosa is a drummer, producer and composer, who was involved with Bajofondo since day one as a producer and A&R when he was the general manager at Surco Records. He joined the band as a musician after they had already produced one album that used drum machine called "Tango Club". For the Mar Dulce album, Santaolalla decided to try live drums as an experiment and asked Sosa to sit in. The success of this led to Sosa's becoming a permanent member. At present Sosa also writes, produced and he also sang in one of his compositions called "Cuesta Arriba" featured in the last Bajofondo album "Presente" (2013).

Verónica Loza is a VJ who connects the band's music with stage presence, generally through digital images. On stage, she appears at a keyboard like a musician but her production is visual. She also provides vocals.

== Discography ==
- Bajofondo Tango Club - 2002
- Remixed - 2005
- Mar Dulce - 2007
- Presente - 2013
- Aura - 2019
- Ohm - 2026

Related albums

- Bajofondo presenta Supervielle - 2004
- Bajofondo presenta Santullo - 2009
- Bajofondo presenta Campo - 2011

DVD

- Supervielle en el Solís - 2006
