= Juan Campodónico =

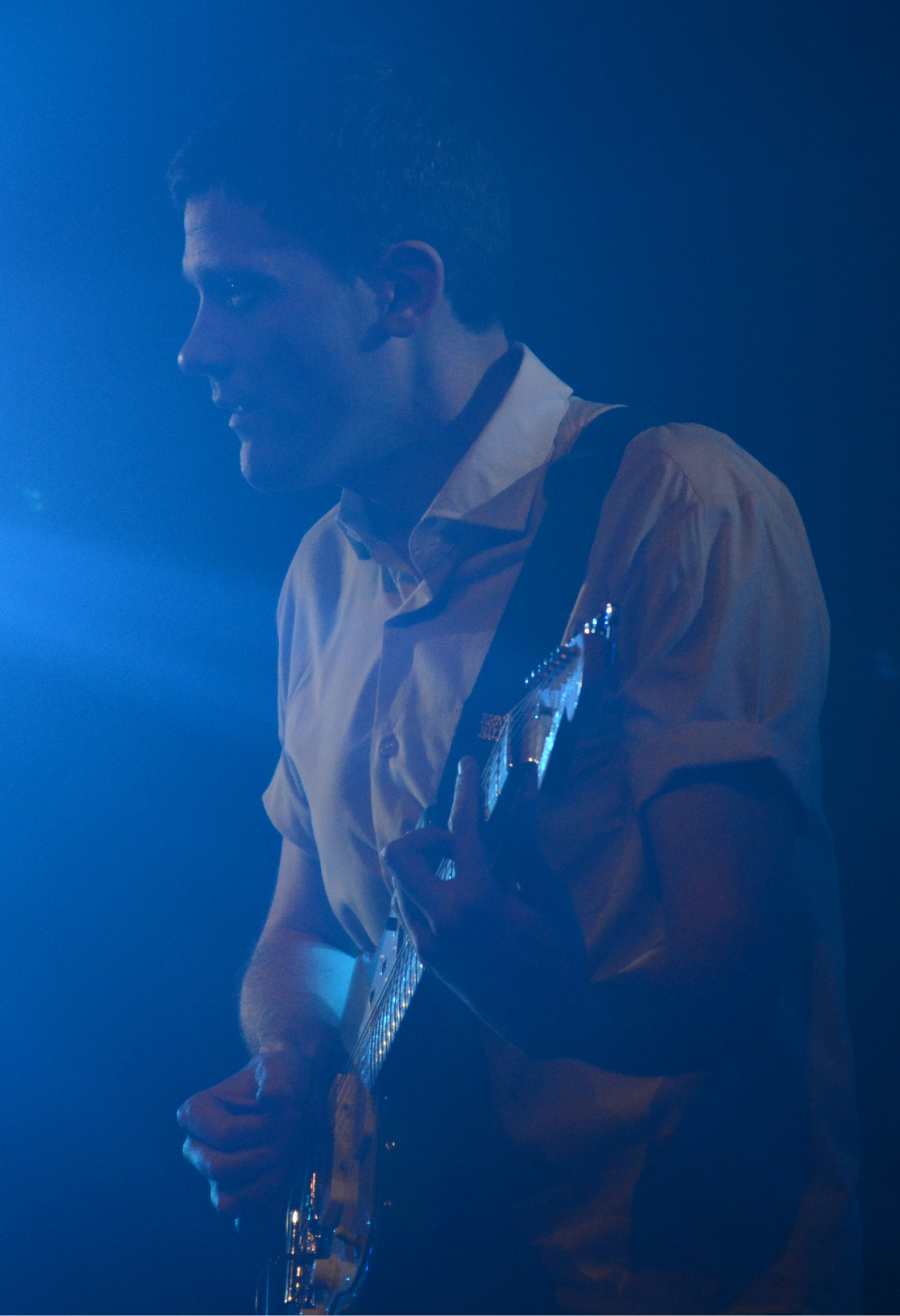

Background information
- Also known as: Campo
- Born: Juan Campodónico; 1971 (age 54–55); Montevideo, Uruguay
- Website: JuanCampodonico.com

Juan Campodónico (Montevideo, Uruguay, 1971), sometimes working under his stage name Campo, is an Uruguayan musician, producer, composer, creator and former member of El Peyote Asesino, Bajofondo and Campo. He produced albums by Jorge Drexler (Frontera, Sea, Eco, 12 Segundos de Oscuridad), Luciano Supervielle, Bajofondo (Tango Club, Mar Dulce, Presente), El Cuarteto de Nos (Raro, Bipolar, Porfiado), La Vela Puerca (El impulso), OMAR, Sordromo, No Te Va Gustar, Santullo and Ximena Sariñana among others. He created the Bajofondo project alongside iconic producer and two-time Academy Award winner for Best Original Score Gustavo Santaolalla (Brokeback Mountain and Babel). He has been awarded with various Latin Grammy, Premios Gardel and Graffiti awards for his work as a producer, as well as with many golden records.

== Career ==
Born in Uruguay in 1971, at an early age Campodónico and his family were exiled to Mexico after the 1973 coup. In 1984, back in Montevideo, he began to be part of several rock and pop bands, like Públicas Virtudes, played with different songwriters as a sideman and made music for theatre and advertising. He even was a guitar teacher.

=== El Peyote Asesino ===
In the mid-1990s, along with other musicians, he created the band el Peyote Asesino, the first in Uruguay which fused hip-hop, rock and grunge. They also incorporated concepts that became popular in the 90s but still maintained a unique Uruguayan dimension. The band was very popular in Uruguay, influencing other bands and getting adequate circulation. They caught the attention of Gustavo Santaolalla, one of the most important Latin rock professionals, producer of Divididos, Café Tacuba and Molotov, among others. In Los Angeles Santaolalla produced Peyote's second CD entitled Terraja, giving it international exposure.

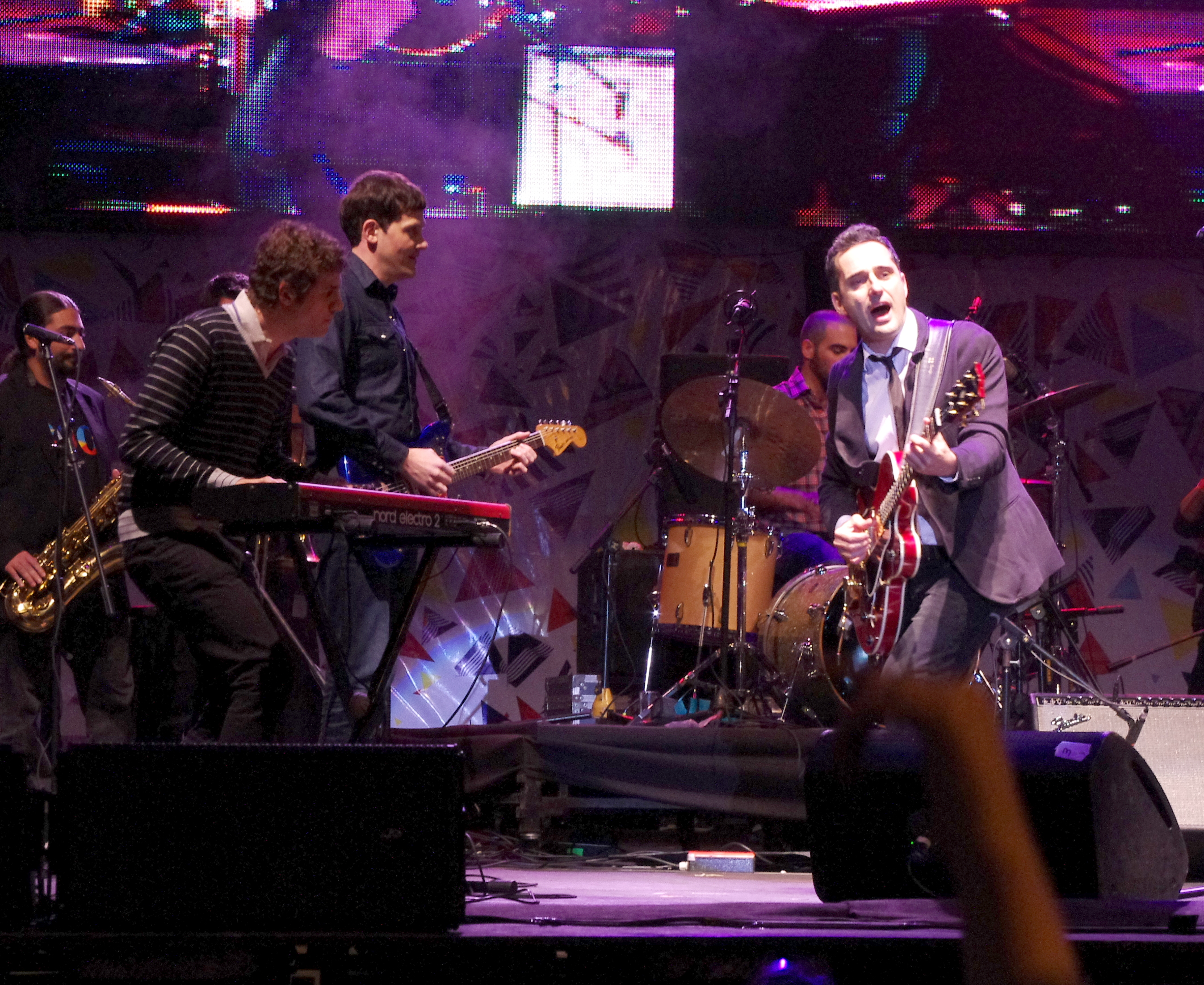
The Uruguayan musician Jorge Drexler with Luciano Supervielle (left on keyboards) and John Campodónico (center guitar), giving a concert on the stage of the gaucho (intersection of Calle 18 de Julio and Constituyente, Montevideo), during the Bicentennial celebrations in Uruguay on 10 October 2011.

=== Bajofondo ===
Campodónico along with Gustavo Santaolalla created Bajofondo in 2001, with the idea of bringing together a collective of Argentine and Uruguayan artists dedicated to creating “contemporary music of the Rio de la Plata". The project, which appeared under the name Bajofondo Tango Club, initially was an alliance of producers, musicians and singers that took shape in the recording studio, and the release of their first album was the culmination of this process. The album Bajofondo Tango Club, released in November 2002, features a very long list of guest artists. Bajofondo Tango Club won the prestigious Premio Gardel as the "Best Electronica Music Album" in Argentina –where the sales reached Triple Platinum- and a Latin Grammy award as the "Best Instrumental Pop Album". The album has sold more than 300,000 copies all over the world. Bajofondo evolved from a producer's concept into a full touring band of eight members (including Santaolalla and Campodónico) that traveled the world. The Bajofondo team launched the solo effort of pianist and composer Luciano Supervielle in 2005. In 2007 they released their second album called Mar Dulce. Presente, the third Bajofondo album was released in 2013 and won two Latin Grammys.

=== Campo ===
Campodónico developed his role as a DJ and remixer, under the name Campo. He has done remixes for Mala Rodríguez and Badfellas, among others. In 2011, he developed a musical project and band under the same name, built upon the instrumental spine of Bajofondo's musicians and a group of composers and performers from different genres and different locations such as songwriter Martin Rivero, Swedish singer Ellen Arkbro, VJ and singer Verónica Loza and electronic musician Pablo Bonilla. CAMPO's debut album was produced by Campodonico himself alongside Gustavo Santaolalla; with Joe Chiccarelli, sound engineer of The Strokes, The Shins and The White Stripes. The independent released album, was nominated for a European MTV Europe award, the Grammys, and Latin Grammys. Entertainment Weekly pick Campo's song "1987" as one of the "25 songs to download before the Grammys".

== Music production ==
When Peyote Asesino split up in 1999, Campodónico found refuge in music production, working with several Uruguayan bands. At that time Jorge Drexler, who was in Madrid and had significant experience there, called him to work and Campodónico along with Carlos Casacuberta (another former member of Peyote) produced his album "Frontera" for Virgin / EMI Spanish which was recorded in Uruguay, entirely on a PC. The album was received by the Spanish press with countless accolades, emphasizing the new sound aesthetics of Drexler. Campodónico also produced Drexler's albums Sea (2001), Eco (2004) and 12 segundos de oscuridad (2006). In 2006 he did the artistic direction and production of the album "Raro" from the group El Cuarteto de Nos which was nominated in 2007 for a Latin Grammy in the category of "Best Rock Song" for "Yendo a la casa de Damián." He was also the producer of Cuarteto's Bipolar (2009) and Porfiado (2012), that won two Latin Grammy Awards. In 2007, along with Gustavo Santaolalla he worked with Calle 13 and produced the song Tango del Pecado included on the album Residente o Vistante. In 2008 he was the co-producer of the album Mediocre from Mexican songwriter Ximena Sariñana. In 2011 he produced the album of Argentinean songstress Deborah del Corral, Nunca o una eternidad. Besides the three Bajofondo albums, Campodónico produced with Gustavo Santaolalla all Bajofondo related projects, like Luciano Supervielle's Bajofondo presenta Supervielle (2005) and Reverie (2010), Santullo (2009) and Campo (2011).

== Media ==
Campodónico's music has been used for many syncs in TV series and commercials. Famous Honda Acura commercial, the Warner Channel serie Nikita and the Introduction of the TV GLOBO soap opera A Favorita (Brazil) used the song "Pa' Bailar", from Bajofondo's Mar Dulce. The song "Los Tangueros", reached number 2 on the Club Playlist on the Dance Chart in Billboard magazine in the United States. The song "Mi Corazón" included in Bajofondo Tango Club, has been played in many parts of the world in both commercials, on television programs and in an HBO series. "Montserrat" has been used by Macy's. He produced a song for the soundtrack of the film Shrek II. In 2013 Campodónico along with Jaime Roos and Pablo Bonilla, composed the original soundtrack for the Uruguayan film Jugadores con Patente. In 2019 he composed the original soundtrack for the Brazilian film Divino Amor.

In 2023, he co-created the exhibition La milonga es hija del candombe así como el tango es hijo de la milonga with Andrés Torrón, which ran at the Sodre's National Archive from October 2023 to April 2024. The show attracted over 12,000 visitors and is currently touring in a reduced version.

== Selected discography ==
=== As performer and composer ===
With Peyote Asesino:

- El Peyote Asesino - 1995
- Terraja - 1998
- Serial - 2021

With Bajofondo:

- Bajofondo Tango Club - 2002
- Remixed - 2005
- Mar Dulce - 2007
- Presente - 2013
- Aura - 2020

With Campo:

- Campo - 2011
- Remixes & Rarezas - 2013

=== As music producer ===
Jorge Drexler

- Frontera (Virgin, 1999)
- Sea (Virgin, 2001)
- Eco (Dro, 2004)
- Eco2 (includes 3 bonus tracks + DVD) (Dro, 2005)
- 12 Segundos de Oscuridad (2006)

Cuarteto De Nos

- El Cuarteto de Nos - 2004
- Raro - 2006
- Bipolar - 2009
- Porfiado - 2012

Luciano Supervielle

(with Gustavo Santaolalla)

- Bajofondo Presenta: Supervielle - 2005
- Rêverie - 2011

Santullo

(with Gustavo Santaolalla)

- Bajofondo presenta: Santullo (2009)

Ximena Sariñana

- Mediocre - 2008
