= Carla Morrison discography =

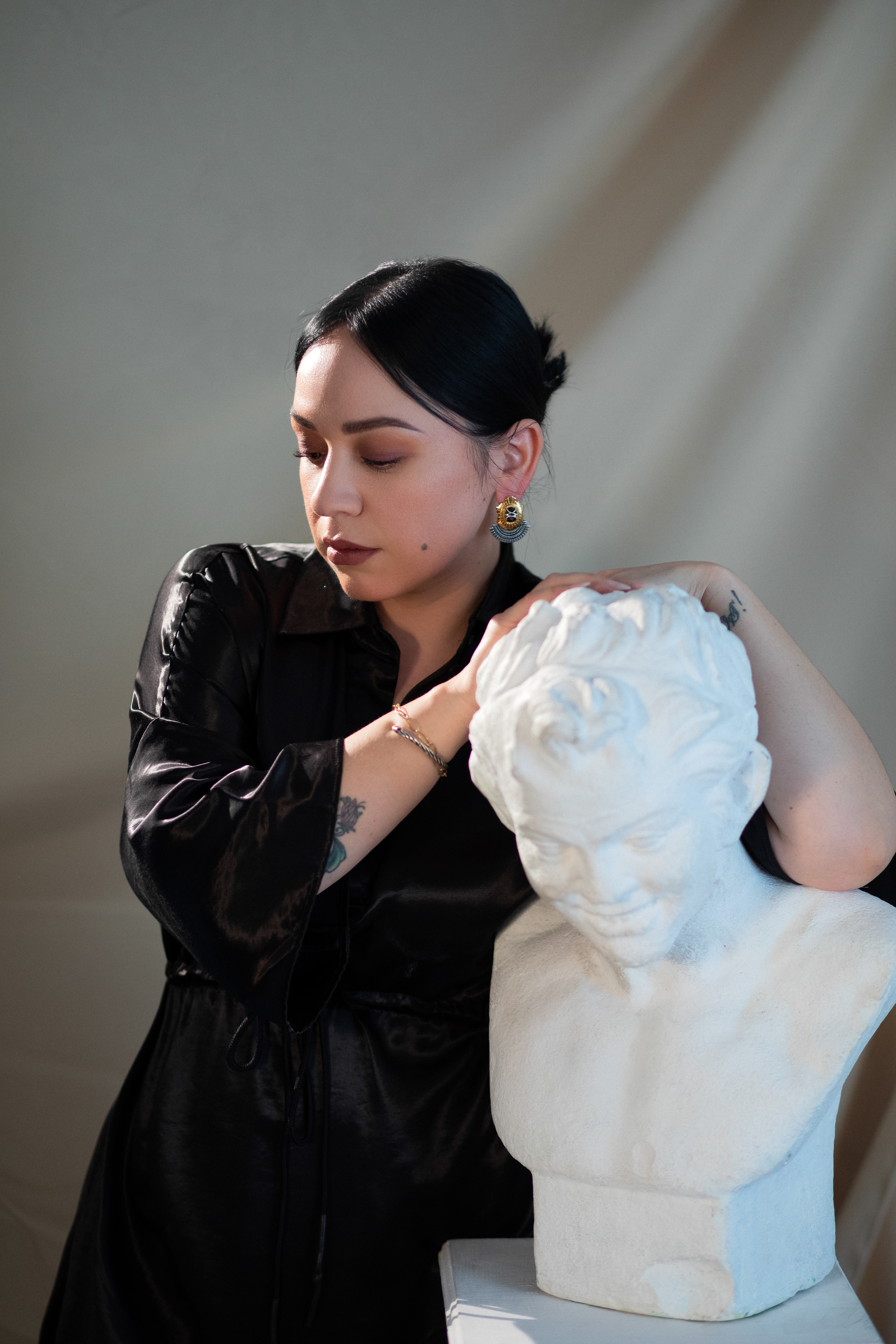
- Studio albums: 3
- EPs: 5
- Singles: 21
- Music videos: 20
- Acoustic Albums: 1

The discography of Mexican singer-songwriter Carla Morrison consists of three studio albums, one acoustic album, five extended plays, 21 singles, 20 music videos and number of other appearances. In 2012 she released her most popular album Déjenme Llorar, allowing her to reach number 1 on the charts in Mexico and being her best commercially received album to date. Her collaboration with Colombian singer Karol G, "Mañana Será Bonito," for her album of the same name, allowed her to debut for the first time on the Billboard Hot 100 chart.

== Albums ==
=== Studio Albums ===
List of studio albums, with release date and label shown
Title	Details	Peak chart positions			Certifications
Title	Details	MEX	US Latin	US Latin Pop	Certifications
Déjenme Llorar	Released: 27 March 2012; Label: Intolerancia; Formats: Digital download, streaming, CD	1	56	12	AMPROFON: Platinum
Amor Supremo	Released: 6 November 2015; Label: Cósmica · Intolerancia; Formats: Digital download, streaming, CD	—	4	1	
El Renacimiento	Released: 29 April 2022; Label: Cósmica; Formats: Digital download, streaming, CD	7	—	—	
"—" denotes releases that did not chart or were not released in that region.

=== Acoustic Albums ===
List of scoustic albums, with release date and label shown
Title	Details	Peak chart positions
Title	Details	ESP
Amor Supremo Desnudo	Released: 9 June 2017; Label: Cósmica; Formats: Digital download, streaming, CD	43

== Extended Plays ==
List of extended plays, with selected details
Title	EP details
Aprendiendo a Aprender	Released: 17 February 2009; Label: Cósmica · Intolerancia; Formats: Digital download, streaming, CD
Mientras Tú Dormías...	Released: 26 October 2010; Label: Cósmica · Intolerancia · Carla Morrison Música; Formats: Digital download, streaming, CD
Jugando en Serio	Released: 21 May 2013; Label: Cósmica · Carla Morrison Música; Formats: Digital download, streaming, CD-R
La Niña del Tambor	Released: 9 December 2016; Label: Cósmica · Carla Morrison Música; Formats: Digital download, streaming, CD, LP
Los Cuatro Actos Acústicos	Released: 6 January 2022; Label: Cósmica · Carla Morrison Música; Formats: Digital download, streaming

== Singles ==
=== As lead artist ===
List of singles as lead artist, showing year released and album name
Title	Year	Peak chart positions			Certifications	Album
Title	Year	MEX Esp Air	US Latin Sales	SPA Digit. Sales	Certifications	Album
"Esta Soledad"	2009	—	—	—		Aprendiendo a Aprender
"Lágrimas"	2009	—	—	—		Aprendiendo a Aprender
"Compartir"	2012	—	—	—		Mientras Tú Dormías...
"Yo Siguo Aquí"	2012	—	—	—		Mientras Tú Dormías...
"Una Salida"	2012	—	—	—		Mientras Tú Dormías...
"Déjenme Llorar"	2013	—	—	—		Déjenme Llorar
"Hasta la Piel"	2013	—	50	—		Déjenme Llorar
"Eres Tú"	2013	—	—	—		Déjenme Llorar
"Disfruto"	2013	38	—	—	PROMUSICAE: Platinum	Déjenme Llorar
"Un Beso"	2015	42	6	—		Amor Supremo
"Tu Atacas"	2015	—	—	—		Amor Supremo
"Todo Pasa"	2015	—	—	—		Amor Supremo
"Dime Mentiras"	2017	—	—	—		Amor Supremo Desnudo
"Te Regalo"	2017	—	—	2	PROMUSICAE: Gold	Amor Supremo Desnudo
"Un Mundo Raro"	2017	—	—	—		Un Mundo Raro: Las Canciones de José Alfredo Jiménez
"Azúcar Morena (Remix)" (with Pere George)	2019	—	—	—		Non-album singles
"No Te Quiero Perder" (ft. Sabino)	2019	—	—	—	AMPROFON: Gold	Non-album singles
"Ansiedad"	2020	—	—	—		El Renacimiento
"No Me Llames"	2020	—	—	—		El Renacimiento
"Obra de Arte"	2021	—	—	—		El Renacimiento
"Contigo"	2021	—	—	—	AMPROFON: 2x Platinum; RIAA: Platinum	El Renacimiento
"Estoy Aquí" (Note: Shakira cover)	2022	—	—	—		Non-album single
"Diamantes"	2022	—	—	—		El Renacimiento
"Anywhere" (with JP Saxe)	2023	—	—	—		Non-album single
"Que Vuelva" (with Kany García)	2024	—	—	—		GARCÍA
"Cuando Te Veo" (with Sistek)	2025	—	—	—		Non-album single
"Toda Una Vida"	2026	—	—	—		Como agua para chocolate (Soundtrack)
"—" denotes items which were not released in that country or failed to chart.

=== As featured artist ===
List of other charted songs, showing year released, selected chart positions, certifications, and originating album
Title	Year	Peak chart positions			Certifications	Album
Title	Year	MEX	US Latin Pop	US Latin Pop Sales	Certifications	Album
"Debajo de Mi Lengua" (Julieta Venegas featuring Carla Morrison)	2011	—	—	—		Non-album single
"Bailar Bien, Bailar Mal" (Gepe featuring Carla Morrison)	2012	—	—	—		GP
"Que Lloro" (Leonel García featuring Carla Morrison)	2013	—	—	—	AMPROFON: 2x Platinum + Gold	Todas Mías...
"Las Maravillas de la Vida" (Los Ángeles Azules featuring Carla Morrison)	2013	3	—	—	AMPROFON: 3x Platinum	Cómo Te Voy a Olvidar
"Adelante" (Esteman featuring Carla Morrison)	2014	—	—	—		Caótica Belleza
"¿A Dónde Van los Muertos?" (Kinky featuring Carla Morrison)	2014	—	—	—		MTV Unplugged
"Porque las Cosas Cambian" (Enrique Bunbury featuring Carla Morrison)	2015	—	—	—		MTV Unplugged: El Libro de la Mutaciones
"Que Se Mueran de Envidia" (Dani Martín featuring Carla Morrison)	2017	—	—	—		La Montaña Rusa
"Ser Paloma" (Lila Downs featuring Carla Morrison)	2017	—	—	—		Salón, Lágrimas y Deseo
"Desahogo" (Nicky Jam featuring Carla Morrison)	2020	—	—	—		Non-album single
"Recuerdo" (Ricky Martin featuring Carla Morrison)	2020	—	12	15	AMPROFON: Platinum	Pausa
"Ojos Noche" (Elsa y Elmar featuring Carla Morrison)	2020	—	—	—	AMPROFON: Gold	Non-album single
"ARENA" (Beéle featuring Carla Morrison)	2025	—	—	—		Borondó
"Jardín" (Majo y Dan featuring Carla Morrison)	2025	—	—	—		Días Contigo
"Where's My Love" (SYML featuring Carla Morrison)	2026	—	—	—		Non-album single
"—" denotes a title that did not chart, or was not released in that territory

=== Promotional Singles ===
List of promotional singles, with release year and associated album
Title	Year	Album
"Todo fue por Amor"	2023	Con Esta Luz
"Si Te Quedas" (ft. Pablo Alborán)	2025	Non-album single

== Charity Songs ==
Title	Year	Album
"Un Derecho de Nacimiento" (ft. Natalia Lafourcade, Julieta Venegas, Alan Ortiz, Pambo, Madame Récamier y Manuel Torreblanca)	2012	Non-album track

== Other charted and certified songs ==
List of other charted songs, showing year released, selected chart positions, certifications, and originating album
Title	Year	Peak chart positions					Certifications	Album
Title	Year	COL	SPA	US	US Latin	WW	Certifications	Album
"Mañana Será Bonito" (with Karol G)	2023	12	76	98	19	98	PROMUSICAE: Oro; RIAA (Latin): 9x Platinum	Mañana Será Bonito

== Colaborations ==
List of guest appearances, with year released, other artist(s), and album name shown
Title	Year	Other artist(s)	Album
"Pajarito del Amor"	2010	Natalia Lafourcade	Aprendiendo a Aprender
"Déjenme Llorar"	2012	Nina Diaz	Non-album tracks
"Hasta la Piel"	2012	Teri Gender Bender	Non-album tracks
"El Mensajero"	2012	León Larregui	Hecho en México
"El Canto (El Mismo Dolor)"	2012	Enrique Bunbury	Non-album tracks
"Yo Se Que Está en tu Corazón"	2012	Juan Gabriel	Non-album tracks
"Mar de Dudas"	2014	Enrique Bunbury	Non-album tracks
"Que No Te Pese"	2014	Vega	Wolverines
"Suéltame"	2014	Jandro	Jandro
"Moon Never Raises"	2015	Calexico	Edge of the Sun
"Desahogar"	2015	Mariel Mariel	Foto Pa' Ti
"Un Año Más (Live)"	2015	Ana Torroja, Ximena Sariñana	Conexión
"Anónimos"	2016	Los Pericos	Soundamerica
"The Train"	2016	Macklemore & Ryan Lewis	This Unruly Mess I've Made
"Tu y Yo"	2016	Tessa Ía	Breve Vol. I
"Que Me Maten (Live)"	2018	Chetes	Chetes 20 Live
"Vibras"	2018	J Balvin	Vibras
"Disfruto"	2020	Clandestino y Yailem	Non-album track
"Días Tristes"	2026	Kenia Os	K de Karma

== Music Videos ==
List of music video appearances, indicating, where applicable, the associated album, and other performers
Title	Year	Other performer(s)	Album	Ref.
"Compartir"	2010	—N/a	Mientras Tú Dormías...	
"Yo Sigo Aquí"	2011	—N/a	Mientras Tú Dormías...	
"Una Salida"	2011	—N/a	Mientras Tú Dormías...	
"Déjenme Llorar"	2011	—N/a	Déjenme Llorar	
"Hasta la Piel"	2012	—N/a	Déjenme Llorar	
"Eres Tú"	2012	—N/a	Déjenme Llorar	
"Disfruto"	2013	—N/a	Déjenme Llorar	
"Las Maravillas de la Vida"	2013	Los Ángeles Azules	Como Te Voy a Olvidar	
"Maleza"	2013	—N/a	Déjenme Llorar	
"Adelante"	2014	Esteman	Caótica Belleza	
"Que No Te Pese"	2014	Vega	Wolverines	
"Un Beso"	2015	—N/a	Amor Supremo	
"Vez Primera"	2016	—N/a	Amor Supremo	
"Azúcar Morena"	2016	—N/a	Amor Supremo	
"No Vuelvo Jamás"	2016	—N/a	Amor Supremo	
"Jesús"	2016	—N/a	La Niña del Tambor	
"Anónimos"	2017	Los Pericos	Soundamerica	
"Tú Atacas"	2017	—N/a	Amor Supremo	
"Que Se Mueran de Envidia"	2017	Dani Martín	La Montaña Rusa	
"Te Regalo"	2017	—N/a	Amor Supremo Desnudo	
"Un Mundo Raro"	2017	—N/a	Un Mundo Raro: Las Canciones de José Alfredo Jiménez	
"Ser Paloma"	2018	Lila Downs	Salón, Lágrimas y Deseo	
"Desahogo"	2020	Nicky Jam	Non-album single	
"Recuerdo"	2020	Ricky Martin	Pausa	
"Ansiedad"	2020	—N/a	El Renacimiento	
"No Me Llames"	2020	—N/a	El Renacimiento	
"Ojos Noche"	2020	Elsa y Elmar	Non-album single	
"Obra de Arte"	2021	—N/a	El Renacimiento	
"Contigo"	2021	—N/a	El Renacimiento	
"Diamantes"	2022	—N/a	El Renacimiento	
"Todo fue por Amor"	2023	—N/a	Con Esta Luz (soundtrack)	
"ARENA"	2025	Beéle	Borondó	
"Si Te Quedas"	2025	Pablo Alborán	Non-album single	
"Where's My Love"	2026	SYML	Non-album single	
"Jardín"	2026	Majo y Dan	Días Contigo	
"Días Tristes"	2026	Kenia Os	K de Karma	
