= Sig Ragga =

Argentine reggae fusion band

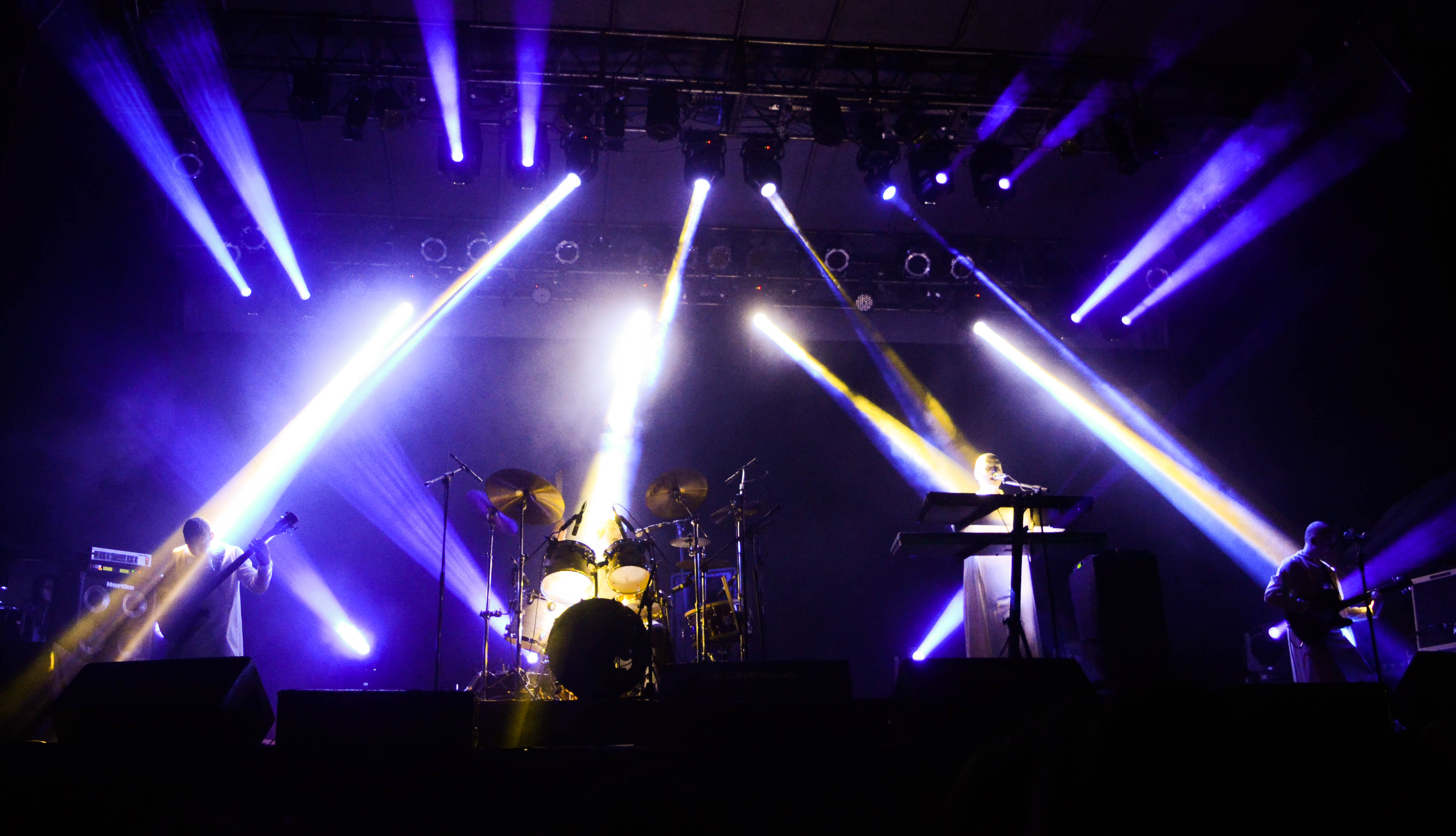
- Sig Ragga performing live.

Background information
- Origin: Santa Fe, Argentina
- Genres: Reggae, reggae fusion
- Years active: 1997-present
- Label: S-Music
- Members: Gustavo "Tavo" Cortés; Ricardo "Pepo" Cortés; Juanjo Casals; Nicolás Gonzalez

Sig Ragga is an Argentine reggae fusion band formed in 1997. The band consists of Gustavo "Tavo" Cortés (vocals and keyboards), Ricardo "Pepo" Cortés (drums and backing vocals), Juan José "Juanjo" Casals (bass) and Nicolás Gonzalez (guitar and backing vocals). The band has released four studio albums and received five Gardel Award nominations and seven Latin Grammy Award nominations.

== Career ==
The band was formed in 1997 in Santa Fe, Argentina, initially Tavo Cortés and Nicolás González started playing music together at 13 while attending to the same school, Tavo's brother Pepo Cortés would join later playing the drums. In 1998, they recorded their first demo with the songs "Ciudad Smog", "Fuga Número 13" and "Filosofía" which helped them to participate in several Ska music festivals, performing with self-made costumes, make-up and body paint. The name of the band comes from playing with the names of different cities from South Africa, mixing them into new words, this experimentation led to the name Sig Ragga Naurú, later being transformed into Sig Ragga.

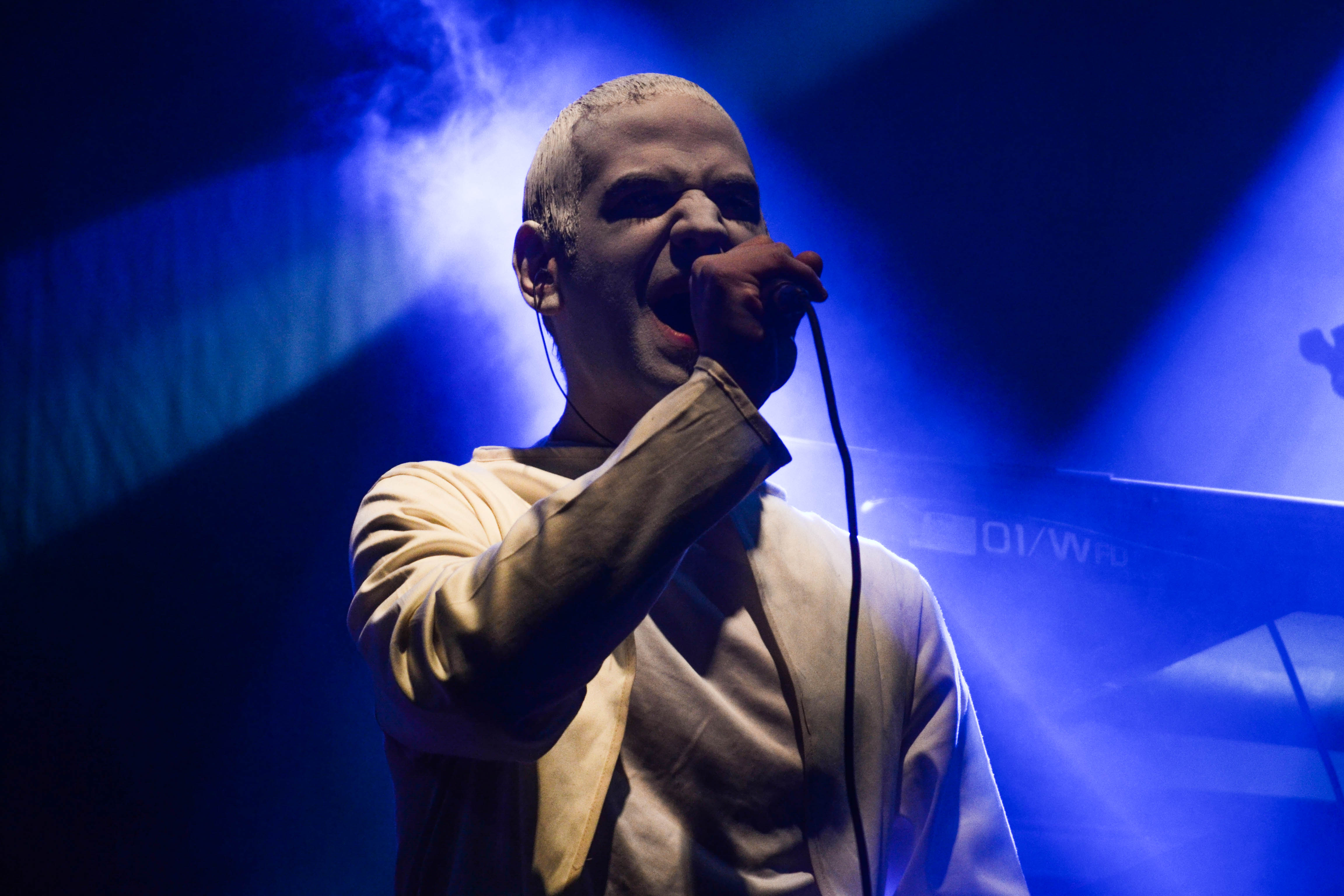
Gustavo "Tavo" Cortés (vocals and keyboards)

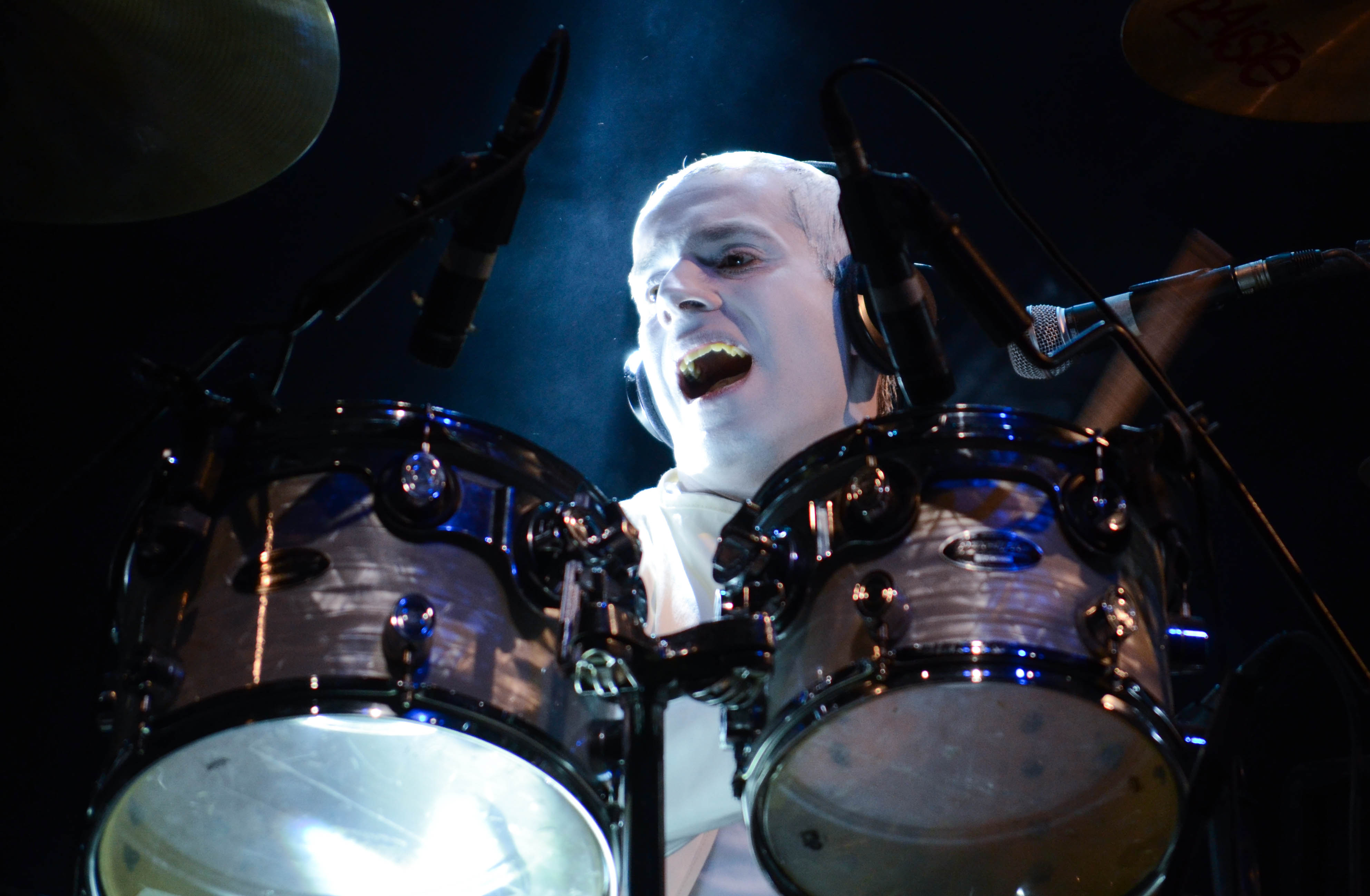
Ricardo "Pepo" Cortés (drums and backing vocals)

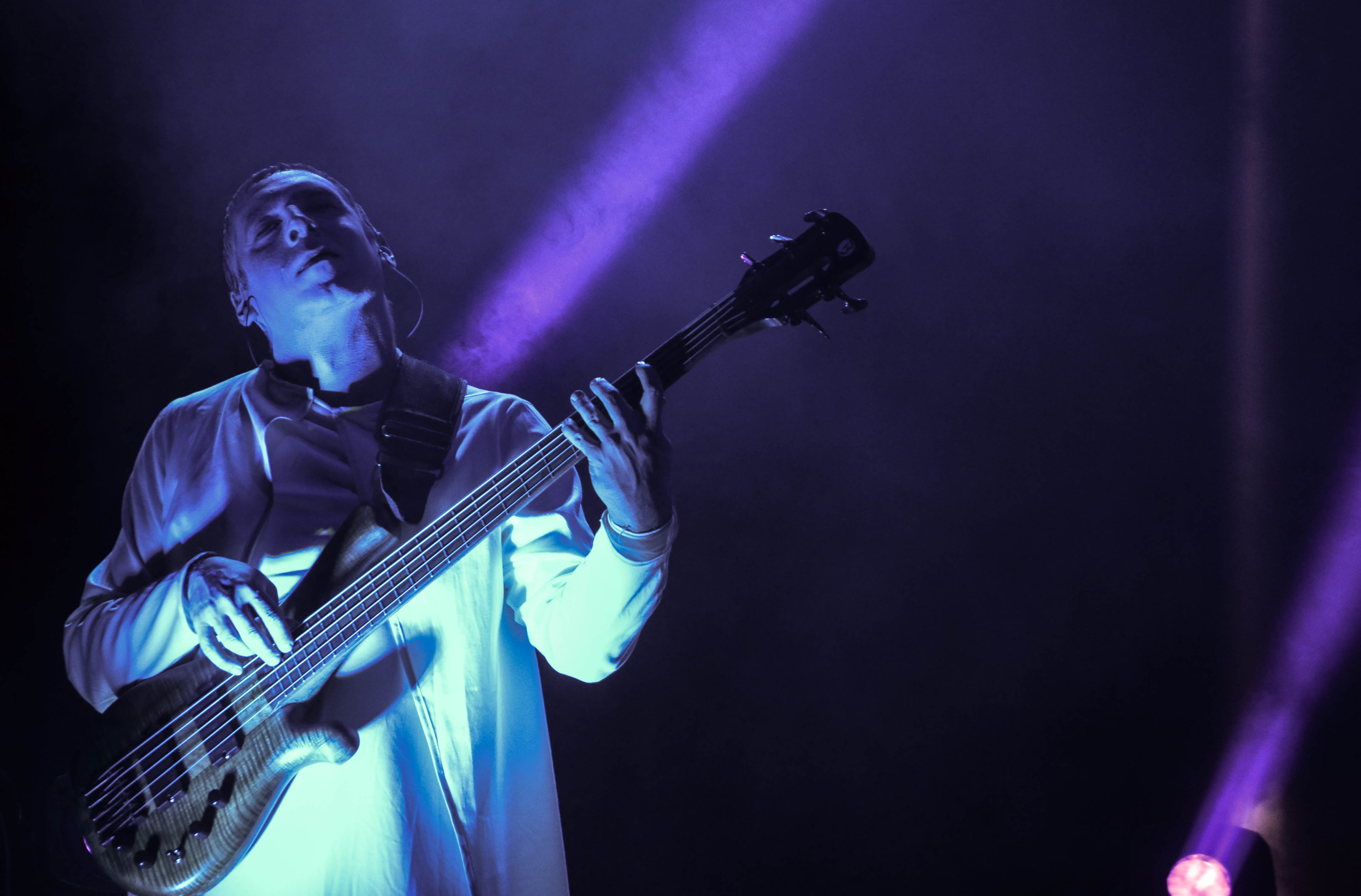
Juanjo Casals (bass)

In 2000, Juanjo Casals joins the band playing the bass. During the same year they start releasing songs like "Guajira", "Apocalipsis", "Eclipse", "Obra 03" y "Reencarnación", later doing recording sessions in 2005 alongside Diego Blanco, keyboardist of the band Los Pericos, as engineer which would lead to the idea of a possible album. The band performed at the Pepsi Music Festival in 2006, 2008 and 2009, alongside reggae artists such as The Skatalites, Ziggy Marley, Los Cafres and Cultura Profética, among others.

During 2009, they work in their first professional music video "Cuchillos" with featured vocals from Pato Banton. The same year, they release their debut album Sig Ragga after over 10 years since the creation of the band, the album was produced by Diego Blanco and featured musicians such as Marcelo Blanco in drums and Miguel Angle Tallarita in the trumpet and flugelhorn. In 2010, they received their first Latin Grammy Award nomination for Best Alternative Song for the song "Resistencia Indigena" from their debut album.

In 2011, the band reedited their debut album adding two versions of the songs "Rock It Baby" and "Natty Dread" by Bob Marley, the covers were also part of the tribute album Tributo a Bob Marley Vol. 2, the album featured several reggae artists like Gondwana, Pablo Molina, Chelo Zimbabwe & The Groove Factory and Dancing Mood, covering Marley's songs.

On June 18, 2013, they release their second album Aquelarre, the project was recorded at Sonic Ranch Studios in Texas with Eduardo Bergallo as engineer and producer. At the 14th Annual Latin Grammy Awards, they received their second nomination for Best Alternative Song, this time for "Pensando", a third nomination for the same category came at the 15th Annual Latin Grammy Awards for "Chaplin" alongside a nomination for Best Alternative Music Album for the album. Also in 2013, the band participated in the album HEMP! Tributo Reggae Latinoamericano a The Beatles - Vol. II, an album composed of songs by The Beatles covered by different reggae and ska artists such as Los Pericos and Pablo Molina, the band contributed with a cover of the 1967 song "The Fool on the Hill". In 2015, the band performed at several music festivals including the Cosquin Rock at the Alternative Stage in Cosquín, Córdoba, the Ciudad Emergente in Buenos Aires and the Taragüí Rock in Corrientes.

On September 16, 2016, the band released their third studio album La Promesa de Thamar, the album was produced by Eduardo Bergallo. The album's first single "Ángeles y Serafines" was nominated for Best Alternative Song. In 2017, the band received their first nomination for the Gardel Awards at the 19th Annual Gardel Awards for Best Alternative Rock/Pop Album while at the 18th Annual Latin Grammy Awards, the band received two nominations, Best Alternative Music Album for the album and Best Alternative Song for "Antonia".

Their fourth album Relatos de la Luna was composed of three parts, each of three songs, the first two parts were released in 2019 with the entire album being released on May 20, 2020 through S-Music. The same year, the band received four nominations at the Gardel Awards, the album was nominated for Album of the Year and Best Alternative Rock Album while Ricardo Cortés was nominated for Best Cover Design as designer and Best Music Video as the director of "Esperando la Magia".

== Influences and style ==
The band has been known for the way they perform, often using visual elements such as costumes, scenography and lighting, Gustavo Cortés, the lead singer of the band has called the group "an artistic collective", saying that "Sig Ragga was always an excuse to capture everything we have been interested to".

The mixture of sounds and genres in their music has been traced by the band to the artistic backgrounds of their parents and especially the wide variety of music genres that they would listen ranging from classical music, jazz and Latinamerican music to funk and even film scores. Reggae started to be an influence to the band during their teenage years when the band was beginning to take form.

== Discography ==
- Sig Ragga (2009)
- Aquelarre (2013)
- La Promesa de Thamar (2016)
- Relatos de la Luna (2020)
- Fotografía (2022)

== Awards and nominations ==
=== Gardel Awards ===
Year	Category	Nominated work	Result	Ref.
2017	Best Alternative Rock/Pop Album	La Promesa de Thamar	Nominated	
2020	Album of the Year	Relatos de la Luna	Nominated	
2020	Best Alternative Rock Album	Relatos de la Luna	Nominated	
2020	Best Cover Design	Relatos de la Luna	Nominated	
2020	Best Music Video	"Esperando la Magia"	Nominated	
2023	Best Alternative Rock Album	Fotografías	Nominated	

=== Latin Grammy Awards ===
Year	Category	Nominated work	Result	Ref.
2010	Best Alternative Song	"Resistencia Indigena"	Nominated	
2013	Best Alternative Song	"Pensando"	Nominated	
2014	Best Alternative Song	"Chaplin"	Nominated	
2014	Best Alternative Music Album	Aquelarre	Nominated	
2016	Best Alternative Song	"Ángeles y Serafines"	Nominated	
2017	Best Alternative Song	"Antonia"	Nominated	
2017	Best Alternative Music Album	La Promesa de Thamar	Nominated	
