= 1987 (song) =

Song by Juan Campodónico featuring Jorge Drexler

from the album Campo
- Language: Spanish
- Published: 2012
- Recorded: 2011
- Genre: Pop
- Length: 2:59
- Label: Bizarro Records
- Composer: Juan Campodónico
- Lyricists: Juan Campodónico; Jorge Drexler
- Producer: Juan Campodónico

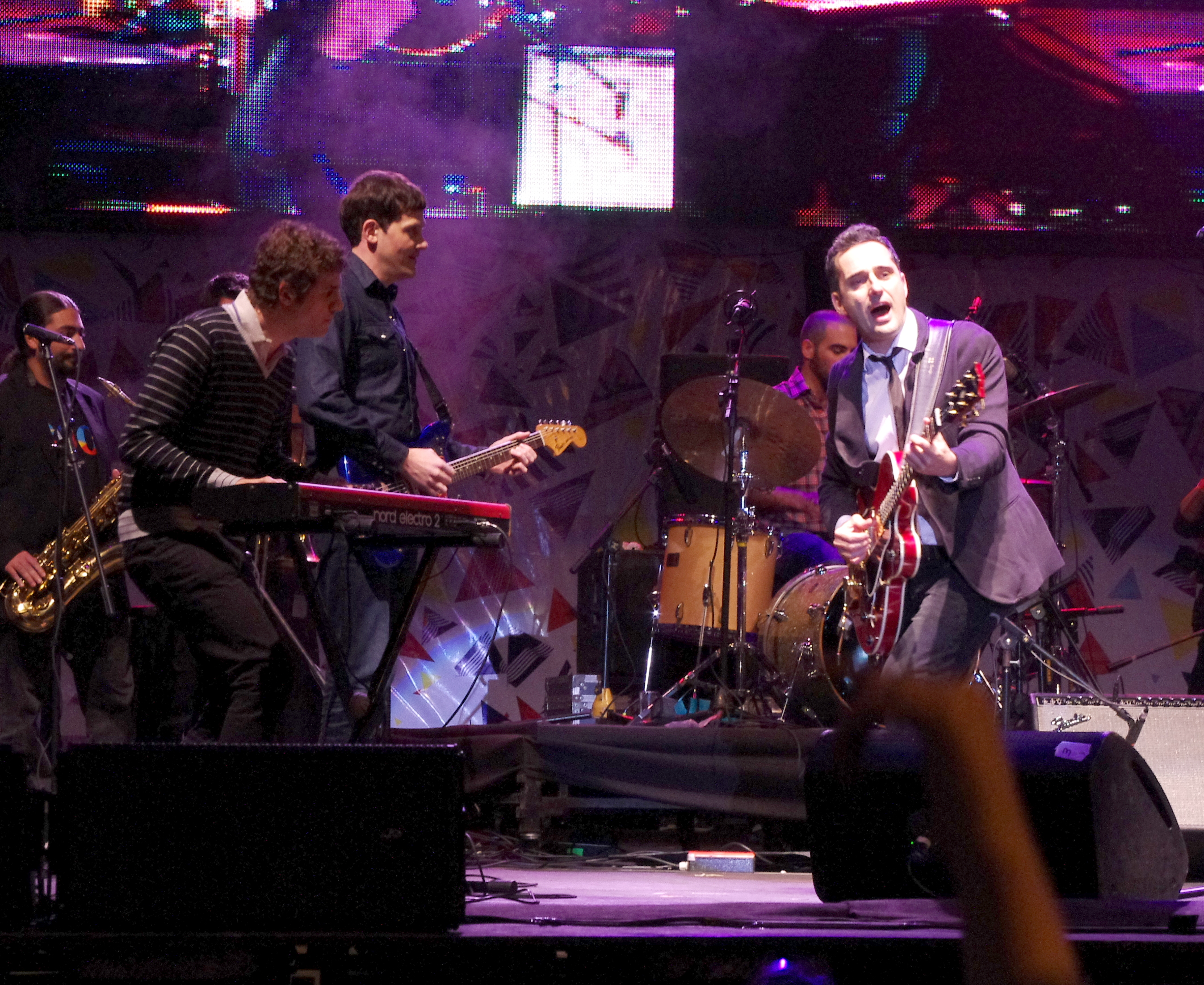
Juan Campodónico and Jorge Drexler performing "1987" in 2011

1987 is a song written by Uruguayan musician and producer Juan Campodónico, co-written and interpreted by Jorge Drexler.

The song is part of the first studio album by Campo, a music collective founded and led by Juan Campodónico. It was recorded in 2011, and produced by Juan Campodónico and Gustavo Santaolalla (both members of the band Bajofondo).

1987 also features in a video directed by Matías Paparamborda and Martin Rivero, where Juan Campodónico is shown as an astronaut with space images, and playing instruments with Veronica Loza, Martin Rivero, and Jorge Drexler playing guitar.

The song won the 1987 Graffiti Award for best video. It was nominated for the Latin Grammy Awards in the category of best alternative song in 2012, and for best song for the MTV Europe. The song is usually performed by Juan Campodónico in his live performances.
