= Amor Supremo =

Studio album by Carla Morrison
- Released: November 6, 2015
- Genre: Latin rock, Latin pop
- Length: 57:33
- Label: Cosmica
- Producer: Carla Morrison, Alejandro Jiménez, Demian Jiménez

Carla Morrison chronology
Déjenme Llorar (2012)	Amor Supremo (2015)	Amor Supremo Desnudo (2017)

Singles from Amor Supremo
- 1. "Un Beso" Released: September 21, 2015; 2. "Tú Atacas" Released: October 21, 2015; 3. "Todo Pasa" Released: November 3, 2015

Amor Supremo (English: Supreme Love) is the second studio album by Mexican singer and songwriter Carla Morrison released on November 6, 2015 through Cosmica Records. It earned Morrison a Grammy Award nomination for Best Latin Rock, Urban or Alternative Album and a Latin Grammy Award nomination for Best Alternative Music Album. The song "Vez Primera" won the Latin Grammy Award for Best Alternative Song, being Morrison's second win in that category after "Déjenme Llorar" in 2012.

The album was recorded through eight months at Playas de Tijuana with production from Alejandro Jiménez and Demián Jiménez alongside Morrison herself.

== Singles ==
The song "Un Beso" was released as the album's first single on September 21, 2015. "Tú Atacas" and "Todo Pasa" were released as the album's second and third singles.

== Critical reception ==
Professional ratings
Review scores
Source	Rating
AllMusic	4/5 stars
Pitchfork	8.0/10

James Christopher Monger for AllMusic wrote about the album that "shot through with subtle electronic flourishes and bolstered by Morrison's flawless voice, Amor Supremo is as sonically luxurious as it is melodramatic and emotionally charged, suggesting a Spanish-language Lana Del Rey by way of Homogenic-era Björk", also commenting on the album opening track "Un Beso", calling it "a noir-ish and ridiculously lush bit of business that perfectly sets up the 12 songs to come". He ended the review writing that "Amor Supremo manages the difficult task of striking the perfect balance between atmosphere and artistry, and presents Morrison as anything but a traditional Latin pop star".

Writing for Pitchfork, Stephen Deusner gave the album an 8.0 out of 10 calling it "one of the most rewarding and genuinely moving pop albums of 2015". He also commented the song "No Vuelvo Jamás", calling it a "towering standout" in the album writing that it is "a pining anthem that opens with the Mexican singer-songwriter delivering a cascade of wordless syllables that sound less like a human voice than a wind instrument".

== Track listing ==
All tracks were written by Morrison.

No.	Title	Length
1.	"Un Beso"	4:19
2.	"Flor que Nunca Fui"	4:31
3.	"Vez Primera"	5:00
4.	"Azúcar Morena"	4:38
5.	"No Vuelvo Jamás"	4:49
6.	"Cercanía"	4:52
7.	"Devuélvete"	3:58
8.	"Mi Secreto"	4:29
9.	"Tierra Ajena"	5:07
10.	"Yo Vivo para Ti"	5:06
11.	"Tú Atacas"	5:50
12.	"Mil Años"	4:24
13.	"Todo Pasa"	5:45
Total length:		62:48

== Charts ==
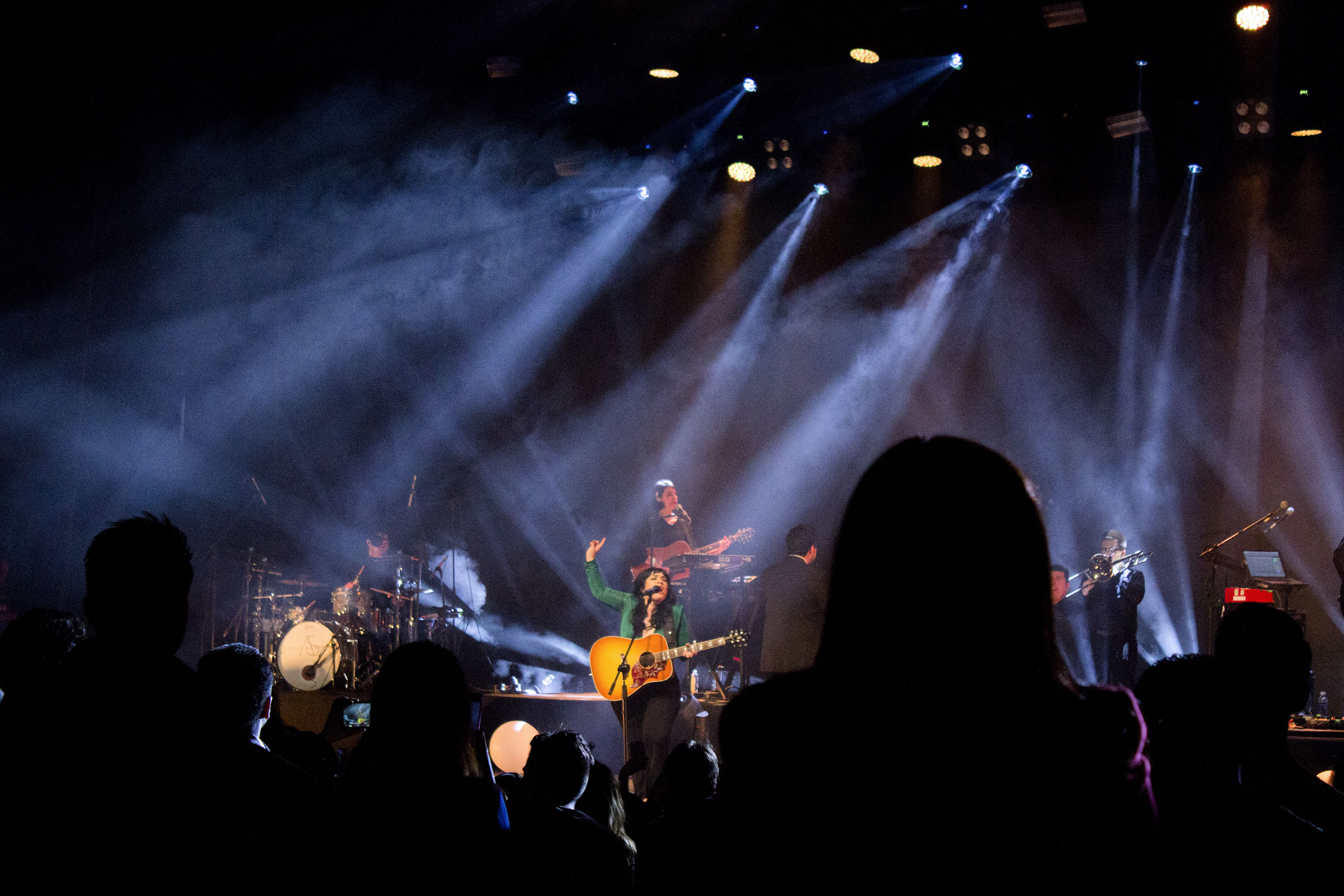
Morrison performing in 2017 her new album, Amor Supremo

Chart (2015)	Peak position
US Top Latin Albums (Billboard)	4
US Latin Pop Albums (Billboard)	1
US Independent Albums (Billboard)	36
