= Déjenme Llorar =

Studio album by Carla Morrison
- Released: March 27, 2012
- Genre: Alternative pop
- Length: 57:33
- Language: Spanish
- Label: Cosmica Records
- Producer: Carla Morrison; Juan Manuel Torreblanca; Andrés Landon

Carla Morrison chronology
Mientras Tú Dormías... (2010)	Déjenme Llorar (2012)	Amor Supremo (2015)

Singles from Déjenme Llorar
- 1. "Déjenme Llorar" Released: November 27, 2011; 2. "Hasta la Piel" Released: March 21, 2012; 3. "Eres Tú" Released: October 3, 2012; 4. "Disfruto" Released: March 10, 2013

Déjenme Llorar (English: Let Me Cry), is the debut studio album by Mexican singer and songwriter Carla Morrison, released on March 27, 2012, through Cosmica Records. It was produced by Morrison alongside Juan Manuel Torreblanca and Andrés Landon.

The album was nominated for the Grammy Award for Best Latin Rock, Urban or Alternative Album at the 55th Annual Grammy Awards, being Morrison's first Grammy nomination. At the 13th Annual Latin Grammy Awards, the project was nominated for Album of the Year and won Best Alternative Music Album, while the title track was nominated for Song of the Year and won Best Alternative Song, being Morrison's first Latin Grammy wins.

Déjenme Llorar topped the Mexican Albums chart and peaked at numbers 15 and 56 at the Latin Pop Albums and Top Latin Albums charts, respectively. It was certified platinum in Mexico, being Morrison's first and only album to date to achieve that.

== Background ==
The album followed Morrison's previous EPs: Aprendiendo a Aprender (2009) and Mientras Tú Dormías... (2010). The project was announced prior to the last concert of the tour she embarked on to promoted the latter EP during 2011, the tour spanned several cities in both Mexico and United States, and culminated in a concert at the Teatro Metropólitan in Mexico City. Morrison decided to work on the album independently instead of signing to a label, she said that "It is not because if you sign, it means that you have already sold yourself, rather it is because I do not like to work under pressure, but rather at my own pace", about the sound of the album she said that "it will be more folk-sounding, it has the same intensity but with a more Latin American tint".

A deluxe version of the album was released in 2014, consisting of 24 songs, divided in two discs. It includes all the original songs from Dejenme Llorar plus alternate versions and five remixes of some songs from the album. About the re-edition, Morrison said that she had been wanting to release it for a while and that "it is a very important album in my career and for many people, for which I put together the most significant topics for my followers".

== Singles ==
The title track of the album, "Déjenme Llorar", was released as the album's first single, followed by "Hasta la Piel" on March 21, 2012. The song peaked at number 50 on the Latin Digital Songs Sales chart. The songs "Eres Tú" and "Disfruto" were released as the album's third and fourth singles, the latter entered the Mexico Espanol Airplay chart, peaking at 38, being her highest appearance in the chart.

A music video for the lead single, directed by Benjamín Estrada and produced by Eduardo López, was uploaded to Cosmica Artists' YouTube account on December 17, 2011. As of 2023, the video has over 360 million views, being one of Morrison's most viewed music videos in the platform.

== Track listing ==
All tracks are produced by Morrison, Juan Manuel Torreblanca and Andres Landon.

No.	Title	Writer(s)	Length
1.	"Apague Mi Mente"	Carla Morrison	03:43
2.	"Me Encanta"	Morrison	04:06
3.	"No Quise Mirar"	Morrison	03:46
4.	"Duele"	Morrison	03:12
5.	"Maleza"	Morrison	03:53
6.	"Eres Tú"	Morrison	03:50
7.	"Tu Orgullo"	Morrison	03:30
8.	"Olvidé"	Morrison	04:49
9.	"Hasta la Piel"	Morrison	04:03
10.	"Disfruto"	Morrison	04:06
11.	"Déjenme Llorar"	Morrison	03:57
12.	"Sin Despedir"	Morrison	03:24
13.	"Tu Manera de Querer"	Morrison	03:33
14.	"Me Puede / Falta de Respeto"	Morrison	10:21
Total length:			57:33

== Charts ==
=== Weekly charts ===
Chart (2012)	Peak position
Mexican Albums Chart (AMPROFON)	1
US Latin Pop Albums (Billboard)	15
US Top Latin Albums (Billboard)	56

== Certification ==
Region	Certification	Certified units/sales
Mexico (AMPROFON)	Platinum	60,000^{^}
^{^} Shipments figures based on certification alone.

== Awards and nominations ==
Year	Award	Category	Nominated work	Result	Ref.
2012	Latin Grammy Awards	Album of the Year	Déjenme Llorar	Nominated	
2012	Latin Grammy Awards	Best Alternative Music Album	Déjenme Llorar	Won	
2012	Latin Grammy Awards	Song of the Year	"Déjenme Llorar"	Nominated	
2012	Latin Grammy Awards	Best Alternative Song	"Déjenme Llorar"	Won	
2013	Grammy Awards	Best Latin Rock, Urban or Alternative Album	Dejenme Llorar	Nominated	
