= 1000 Vivos =

Live album by Los Pericos
- Released: September 26, 2000
- Recorded: December 28, 1997, and September 1, 1999
- Label: EMI

Professional ratings
Review scores
Source	Rating
Allmusic	4/5 stars

1000 Vivos (English: 1000 Live) is a live album by Los Pericos. The tracks come from a 1997 concert in Buenos Aires which celebrated the band's tenth anniversary and from a 1999 concert celebrating the band's first 1000 shows.

== Track listing ==
No.	Title	Length
1.	"La Hiena"	4:41
2.	"Párate y Mira"	4:04
3.	"Nada Que Perder"	4:23
4.	"Home Sweet Home" (with Los Autenticos Decadentes)	3:39
5.	"Runaway"	1:50
6.	"Eso Es Real"	2:07
7.	"Ocho Rios" (with Fito Paez)	3:28
8.	"Rata China"	1:55
9.	"Sin Cadenas" (with Guillermo Boneto)	4:34
10.	"Monkey Man"	1:22
11.	"Voy Caminando Lento"	1:22
12.	"Su Galán"	4:08
13.	"Bajo el Mismo Cielo" (with Zeta Bossio)	4:58
14.	"Pupilas Lejanas"	3:50
15.	"Boulevard"	4:13
16.	"Eu VI Chegar"	3:25
17.	"Waitin'"	2:50
18.	"Amandla"	4:28
19.	"Jamaica Reggae"	3:38
20.	"No Me Pares"	4:03
