= Amor Supremo Desnudo =

Studio album by Carla Morrison
- Released: June 9, 2017
- Genre: Indie pop
- Length: 70:28
- Label: Cosmica
- Producer: Carla Morrison; Alejandro Jiménez

Carla Morrison chronology
Amor Supremo (2015)	Amor Supremo Desnudo (2017)	El Renacimiento (2022)

Singles from Amor Supremo Desnudo
- 1. "Dime Mentiras" Released: June 7, 2017; 2. "Te Regalo" Released: July 9, 2017

Amor Supremo Desnudo (English: Supreme Love Naked) is the third studio album and first acoustic album by Mexican singer and songwriter Carla Morrison released on June 9, 2017 through Cosmica Records. The album consists of acoustic versions of all thirteen songs from Morrison's previous album Amor Supremo plus two new songs, "Dime Mentiras" and "Te Regalo". The project received a nomination for Best Traditional Pop Vocal Album at the 19th Annual Latin Grammy Awards.

The idea for an acoustic version of the songs from Amor Supremo came during a tour in Spain, where according to Morrison, "many people that I met gave me the idea of doing an acoustic version, so I didn't stop until making it, I realized that it sounded really good".

== Singles ==
"Dime Mentiras" was released on June 7, 2017 as the albums first single followed by "Te Regalo", released on July 9, 2017. The latter peaked at number two in the Spain Digital Songs Sales chart.

== Track listing ==
All tracks were written by Morrison.

No.	Title	Length
1.	"Un Beso"	4:21
2.	"Flor que Nunca Fui"	4:00
3.	"Vez Primera"	5:01
4.	"Azúcar Morena"	4:37
5.	"No Vuelvo Jamás"	4:56
6.	"Cercanía"	4:17
7.	"Devuélvete"	4:14
8.	"Mi Secreto"	3:53
9.	"Tierra Ajena" (with Ely Guerra)	5:23
10.	"Yo Vivo para Ti"	4:48
11.	"Tú Atacas"	5:48
12.	"Dime Mentiras"	4:50
13.	"Mil Años"	4:43
14.	"Te Regalo"	4:02
15.	"Todo Pasa"	5:35
Total length:		70:28

== Charts ==
Chart (2017)	Peak position
Spain Top Albums (PROMUSICAE)	43
