= Carla Morrison =

Mexican musician (born 1986)

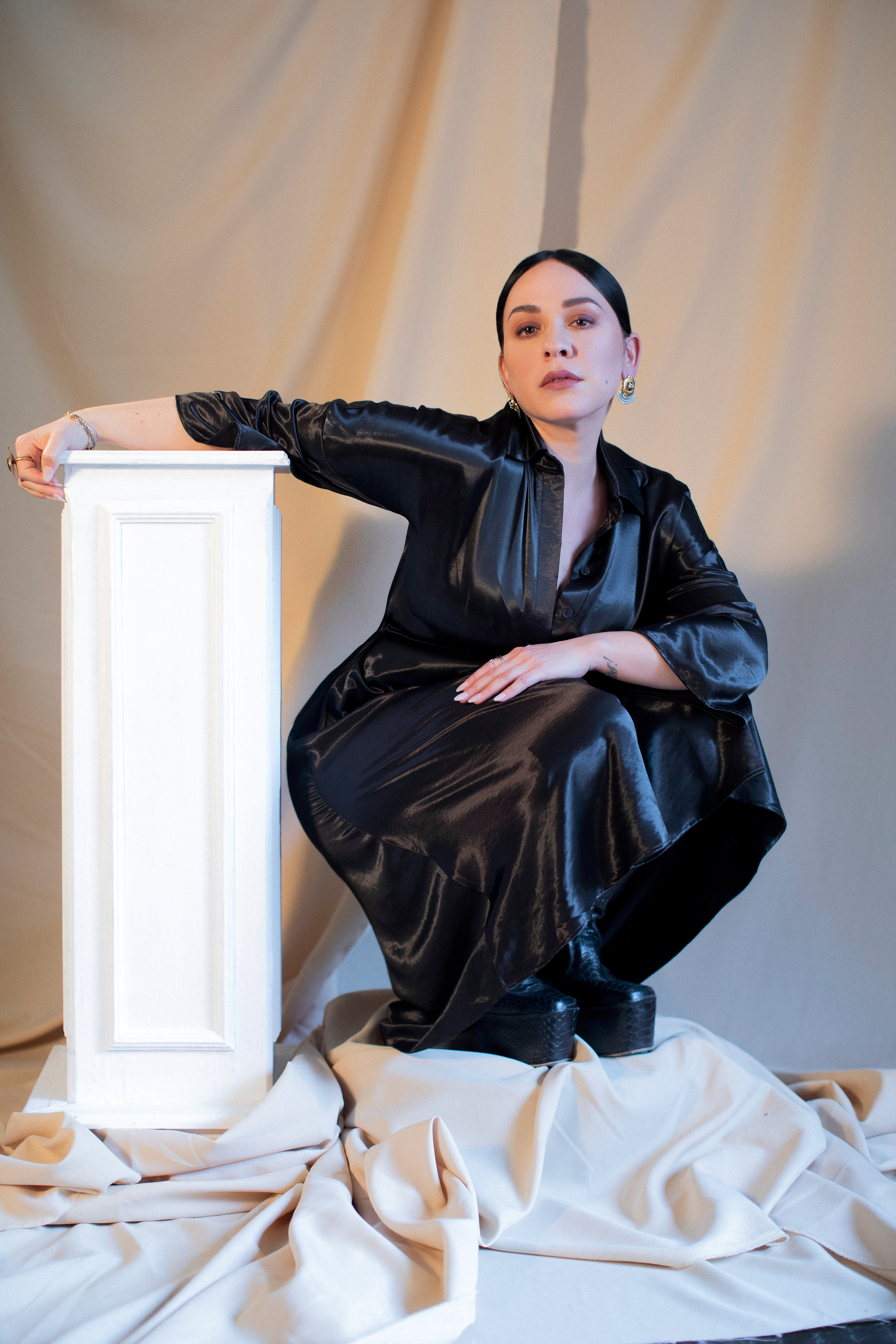
- Carla Morrison (2020)

Background information
- Born: Carla Patricia Morrison Flores; 19 July 1986 (age 40); Tecate, Baja California, Mexico
- Genre: Indie pop
- Occupations: Guitarist; singer
- Instruments: Vocals; guitar
- Years active: 2008–present
- Labels: Cosmica Artists (USA); Intolerancia Records (Mexico); KUDETA; Honey Bunny (USA)
- Website: carlamorrisonmusic.com

Carla Patricia Morrison Flores (born July 19, 1986) is a Mexican indie pop guitarist and singer. She has released three studio albums and has received various awards and nominations including two Grammy Award nominations and three Latin Grammy Awards.

== Early life ==
Carla Morrison was born in Tecate, Baja California, to Mexican parents, Porfiria Flores and Hilario Viera, who obtained the last name Morrison when he was adopted by William Guy Morrison, born in California to a British migrant named Laura Morrison.

Morrison lived in Tecate during her early years, taking classes in drawing and dancing. At 17, she moved to Phoenix, Arizona to study music at the Mesa Community College, later dropping out to perform as the lead singer of the band Babaluca alongside Nicolas Kizer and Niki Petta. The band started working with Mark Erickson from Colorstone, but never released a completed project. Morrison soon stepped away from the band in order to pursue a solo career.

== Musical career ==
In 2009, Morrison released her first EP, entitled Aprendiendo a Aprender, produced independently in the home studio of Jordan Beriault in Tempe, Arizona, the record contains six songs composed and produced by herself, plus a cover of Ramón Ayala's song "Tragos de Amargo Licor". Her second EP Mientras tú Dormías... was released in 2010 and was produced by Mexican singer and songwriter Natalia Lafourcade. The latter EP received a nomination for Best Alternative Music Album at the 12th Annual Latin Grammy Awards. In 2011, she performed her EPs in several venues including the Teatro Metropólitan and the Lunario of the Auditorio Nacional, both in Mexico.

On 24 March 2012, she released her debut album Déjenme Llorar produced by Juan Manuel Torreblanca from the band Torreblanca and Andrés Landon. The album was certified platinum in Mexico and entered both the Top Latin Albums and Latin Pop Albums Billboard charts, at number 56 and 15 respectively. At the 13th Annual Latin Grammy Awards, Morrison received four nominations including Album of the Year and won Best Alternative Music Album for the album and Best Alternative Song for the title track "Déjenme Llorar". The album also received a nomination for Best Latin Rock, Urban or Alternative Album at the 55th Annual Grammy Awards. After the release of the album, she participated in different music festivals, including the Festival Viva la Canción 2012 in Madrid, Estéreo Picnic Festival in Bogotá, Pa’l Norte Rock Festival 2012 in Monterrey and Lollapalooza Chile 2013 in Santiago, among others.

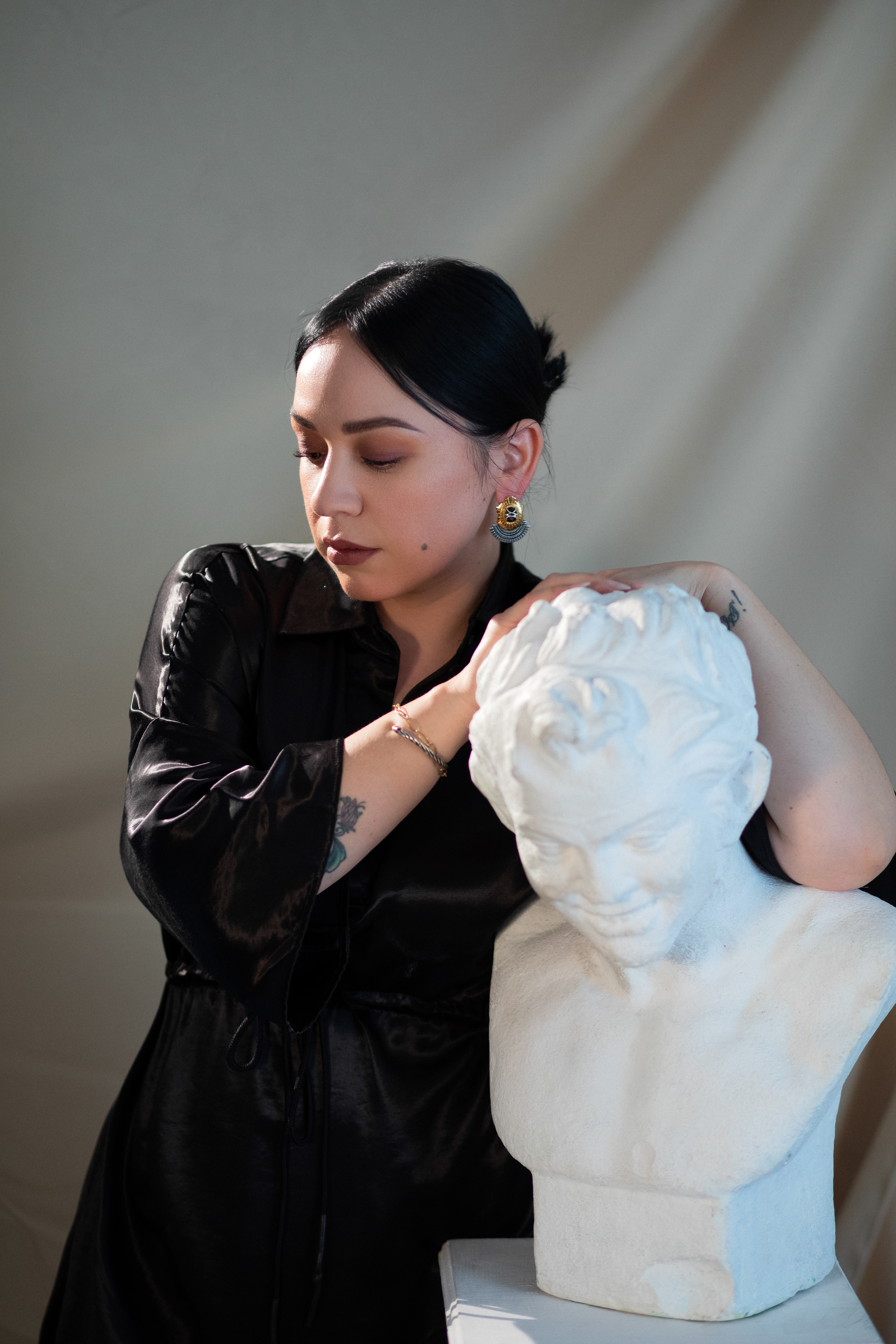
Carla Morrison - 2020

In 2013, Morrison was featured in the song "Yo sé que está en tu corazón" from Juan Gabriel's album Los Dúo, Vol. 2, the album was composed of new versions of songs by Gabriel as duets with different artists. Also in 2013, Morrison released her third EP Jugando en Serio, consisting of acoustic versions of the songs "Yo Sigo Aquí", "Compartir", "Lágrimas", "Buena Malicia" and "Pan Dulce" from her previous records.

In 2015, she made her acting debut in the romantic comedy film Ana Maria in Novela Land as Laura. On 6 November 2015, she released her second studio album Amor Supremo through Cosmica. The album was recorded through eight months at Playas de Tijuana with production from Alejandro Jiménez and Demián Jiménez. With the album, she earned her second Grammy Award nomination for Best Latin Rock, Urban or Alternative Album while at the 17th Annual Latin Grammy Awards, she was nominated for Best Alternative Music Album and won Best Alternative Song for "Vez Primera". To promote the album, Morrison performed at various festivals and venues like the Coachella Festival in the United States and the Teatro Esperanza Iris in Ciudad de México. On 8 December 2016, she released the EP La Niña del Tambor, the project consisted of six Christmas carols both in English and Spanish including "Noche de Paz", "White Christmas" and "Have Yourself a Merry Little Christmas".

On 9 June 2017, she released Amor Supremo Desnudo, the album was produced alongside Alejandro Jiménez and consists of thirteen acoustic versions of songs from her previous albums plus two new songs, "Te Regalo" and "Dime Mentiras". The idea for an acoustic version of her albums came during a tour in Spain, where according to Morrison, "many people that I met gave me the idea of doing an acoustic version, so I didn't stop until making it, I realized that it sounded really good". The album was nominated for Best Traditional Pop Vocal Album at the 19th Annual Latin Grammy Awards. In 2018, she collaborated in the single "Ser Paloma" by Mexican singer Lila Downs, the music video for the song featured women of different ages, backgrounds and professions to represent the diversity of women in society. The same year, she appeared in the track "Vibras" from J Balvin's album Vibras.

On 21 September 2020, she released the single "Ansiedad" from her upcoming album El Renacimiento, the music video for the song was directed by Colin Solal Cardo and recorded in Lithuania.

== Discography ==
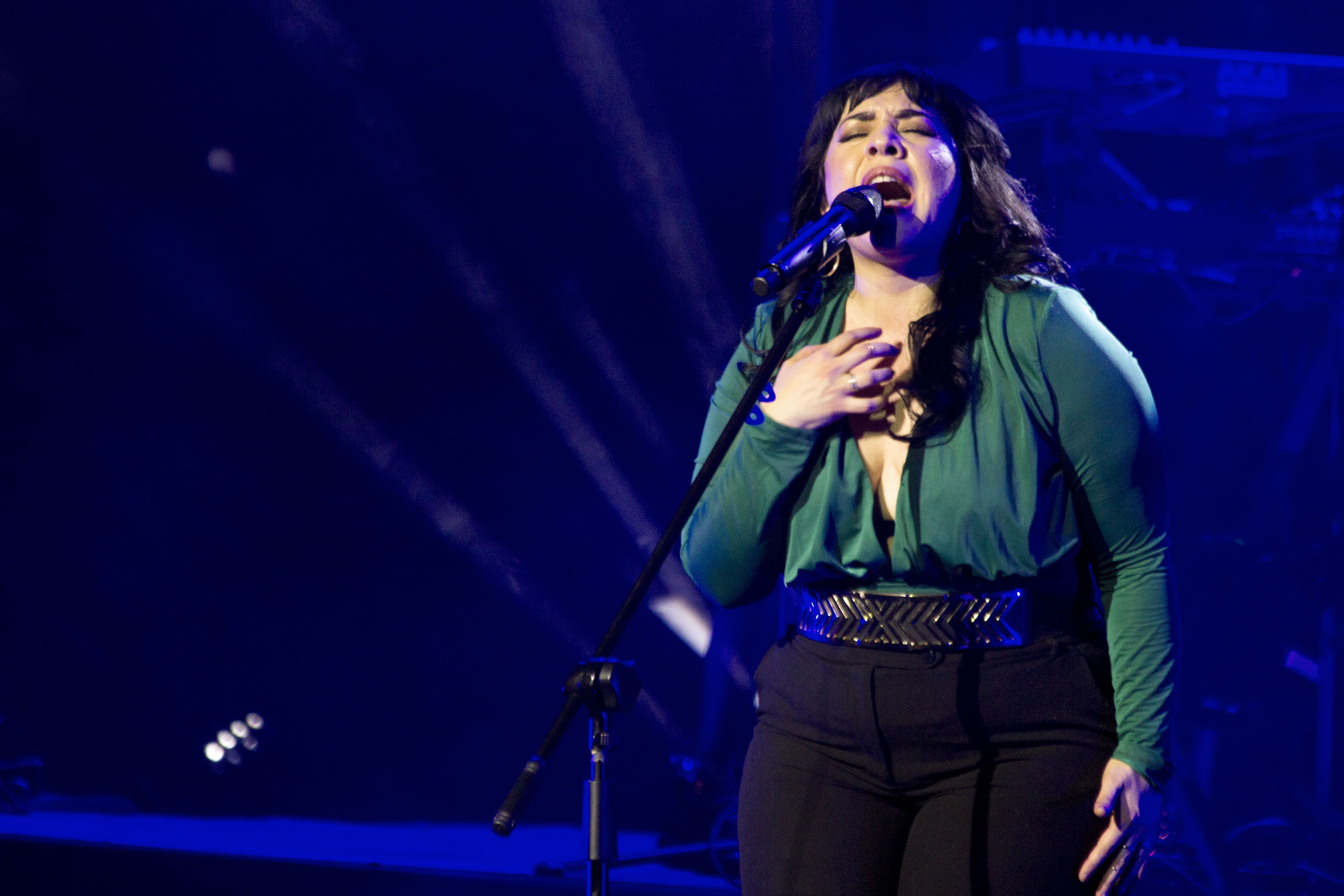
Carla Morrison giving a concert to showcase her new album, Amor Supremo, at the Teatro de la Ciudad Esperanza Iris

=== Studio albums ===
- Déjenme Llorar (2012)
- Amor Supremo (2015)
- Amor Supremo Desnudo (2017)
- El Renacimiento (2022)

=== Extended plays ===
- Aprendiendo a Aprender (2009)
- Mientras Tú Dormías... (2010)
- Jugando en Serio (2013)
- La Niña del Tambor (2016)

== Awards and nominations ==
=== Grammy Awards ===
Year	Category	Nominated work	Result	Ref.
2013	Best Latin Rock, Urban or Alternative Album	Déjenme Llorar	Nominated	
2017	Best Latin Rock, Urban or Alternative Album	Amor Supremo	Nominated	

=== Latin Grammy Awards ===
Year	Category	Nominated work	Result	Ref.
2011	Best Alternative Music Album	Mientras Tu Dormías	Nominated	
2012	Album of the Year	Déjenme Llorar	Nominated	
2012	Best Alternative Music Album	Déjenme Llorar	Won	
2012	Song of the Year	"Déjenme Llorar"	Nominated	
2012	Best Alternative Song	"Déjenme Llorar"	Won	
2016	Best Alternative Music Album	Amor Supremo	Nominated	
2016	Best Alternative Song	"Vez Primera"	Won	
2018	Best Traditional Pop Vocal Album	Amor Supremo Desnudo	Nominated	
2022	Song of the Year	"Encontrarme"	Nominated	
2022	Best Pop Vocal Album	El Renacimiento	Nominated	
