= Los Pericos =

Argentine band

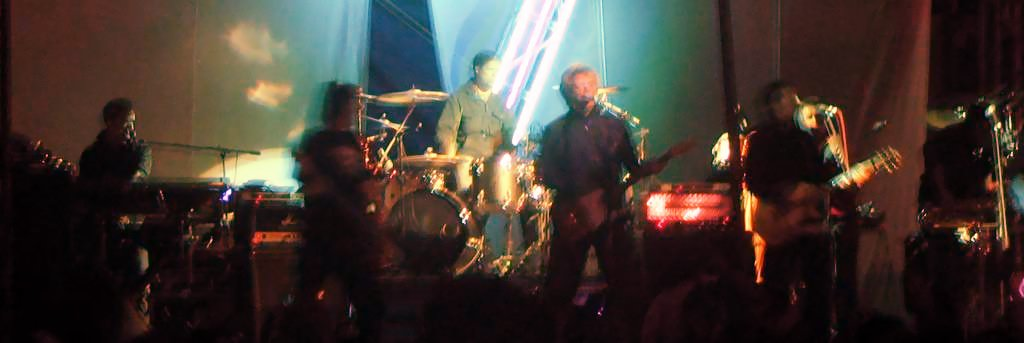
- Los Pericos performing in November 2005

Background information
- Origin: Argentina
- Genres: Reggae, ska, rock
- Years active: 1987–present
- Labels: EMI, Universal
- Members: Diego Blanco; Juan Alfredo Baleirón; Gastón "Moreira" Gonçalves; Marcelo Blanco; Ariel Fernando Raiman; Horacio Avendaño; Guillermo Luis Valentinis
- Past members: Bahiano
- Website: pericos.com

Los Pericos is an Argentine band formed in 1987. The band has enjoyed international success, especially throughout South America. In 2006, the band received some notable exposure for North American audiences when featured on an episode of Anthony Bourdain's No Reservations. The band was also featured in the 2000 documentary, Botín de guerra (Spoils of war).

== History ==
Los Pericos started as a group of friends who used to get together to play music, and became the first reggae band in Argentina to reach a mass audience.

Their first record, El Ritual De La Banana, produced by Javier Calamaro, was released by EMI in December 1987. It sold 150,000 copies in six months, became the best-selling album of 1988 and went triple platinum. One year later, they recorded King Kong, produced by Herbert Vianna (leadman and songwriter of the Brazilian group Paralamas Do Sucesso). Maxi Anfitreu followed in 1989, but neither it nor Rab a Dab Stail (1990) lived up to expectations, commercially or musically.

In 1990, Los Pericos launched their third studio album, Rab a Dab Stail, and they went on tour, performing several live concerts around Argentina, highlighting the two shows at the Luna Park Stadium in Buenos Aires.

Their fourth album, Big Yuyo, was released in 1993. That same year Los Pericos were invited to participate in the sixth International Festival Reggae Sunsplash Edition, taking place annually in Jamaica. In 1994, they performed again in the International Festival Reggae Sunsplash, and closed the World Beat Night. Rita Marley invited them to the Tuff Gong Records studios. That July, they embarked on a tour through the United States, after finishing the recording of their fifth album in that country.

With the release of Pampas Reggae in 1994, tours across Latin America and the sales of their records continued to increase. Their sixth album, Yerbabuena, was released simultaneously in every country of Latin America, the United States and Spain.

In 1996, the band performed "Wanna Be Loved (Desea ser Amado)" for the AIDS benefit album, Silencio=Muerte: Red Hot + Latin, produced by the Red Hot Organization with Buju Banton.

In March 1997, Los Pericos was the only Latin American band invited to participate in the reggae tribute to The Police and recorded together with Stewart Copeland, the track "Darkness". They also participated in the Latin tribute to The Police Outlandos D'Americas: Tributo a Police, performing a Spanish-language version of the same song, titled "Oscuridad". In December 1997, they celebrated their tenth anniversary with a free live outdoor concert, supported by the Gobierno De La Ciudad De Buenos Aires.

By mid July 1998, they started recording their next album at their own studio, Robledo Sound Machine. They travelled again to Caracas, but this time to the 50th anniversary celebration of the Universal Human Rights Declaration (at La Carlota Airport), organised by Amnesty International.

On 27 November 1998, they released Mystic Love. In November they started the fifth Mystic Love Tour including the cities of New Jersey, Queens, Manhattan and Montreal. At the beginning of 2000, Los Pericos gave a show at River Plate Stadium celebrating the new millennium. Los Pericos mixed a live album, a tribute to the 1,008 shows performed up to that time, called 1000 Vivos. During 2001 they continued with their shows across the continent and were invited to close the 2001 Vive Latino edition.

In 2004, Juanchi Baleiron switched from lead guitar to vocals. In August 2005 the band released 7 with performances across Latin America. In 2006 the band went on one of its most important tours, performing in México, Uruguay, Ecuador, Puerto Rico, United States, Venezuela, Canadá, Bolivia, Colombia, Chile, El Salvador and Perú; more than 140 concerts in a year. In April 2007, they returned to Mexico for the Reggae Music Fest featuring Pato Banton in their set. During May they closed the International Festival of Veracruz.

== Discography ==
- El Ritual De La Banana (1987)
- King Kong (1988)
- Maxi Anfitreu (1989)
- Rab a Dab Stail (1990)
- 1992 (1992)
- Big Yuyo (1992)
- Los Maxis (1994)
- Pampas Reggae (1994)
- Yerbabuena (1996)
- Mystic Love (1998)
- 1000 Vivos (2000)
- El Ritual De Los Pericos (2001)
- Desde Cero (2002)
- 7 (2005)
- Pura Vida (2008)
- Pericos & Friends (2010)
- Soundamerica (2016)
- Viva Pericos! (2022)
- Inmortal (2026)
