= Latin Grammy Award for Best Alternative Song =

Honor for Spanish songwriters

- Awarded for: quality alternative music songs
- Country: United States
- Presented by: The Latin Recording Academy
- First award: 2007
- Currently held by: Ben Aler, Carlos Casacuberta, Jorge Drexler, Manuel Lorente Freire "Spread Lof", Gabriel Lugo "Gabo", Jesús Martos Castillo "Presser", Mauro, Alberto Montenegro "Beto", PJ Sin Suela, Andrés Story & Mateo Sujatovich for "Ante la Duda, Baila" (2026)
- Website: latingrammy.com

The Latin Grammy Award for Best Alternative Song is an honor presented annually at the Latin Grammy Awards, a ceremony that recognizes excellence and creates a wider awareness of cultural diversity and contributions of Latin recording artists in the United States and internationally. The award is reserved to the songwriters of a new song containing at least 51% of the lyrics in Spanish. Instrumental recordings or cover songs are not eligible.

The award has been presented to songwriters originating from France, Mexico, Colombia and Puerto Rico. It was first earned by French musician Manu Chao for the song "Me Llaman Calle" in 2007.

The band members of Café Tacvba, Calle 13, Jorge Drexler and Carla Morrison are the only songwriters to have received this award more than once.

== Recipients ==
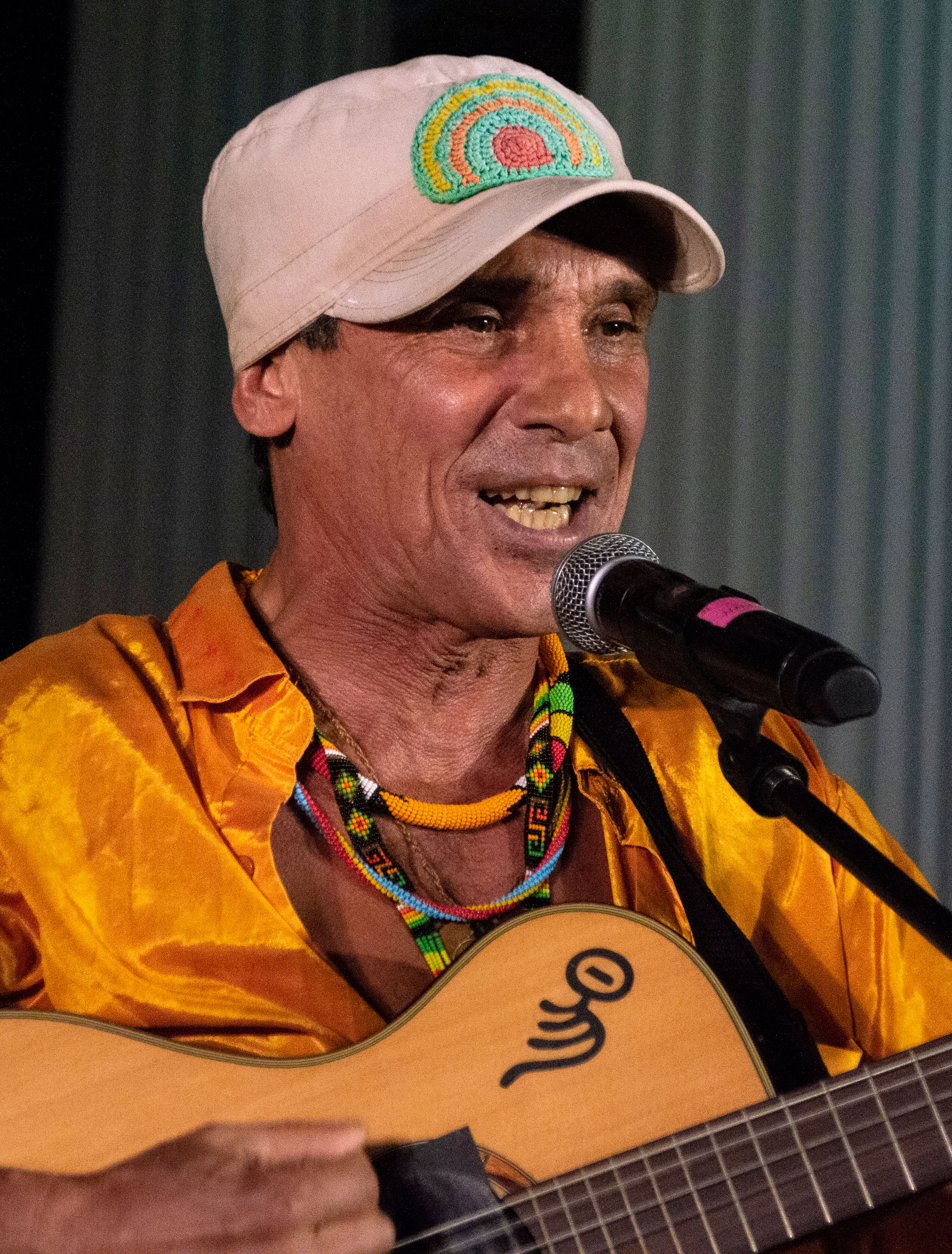
Manu Chao was the inaugural winner of the award.

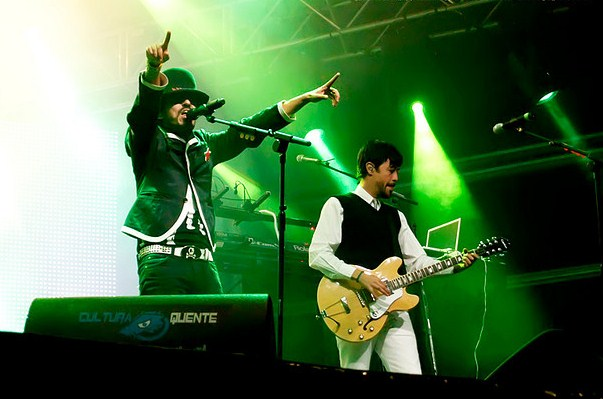
Two-time winners Café Tacvba.

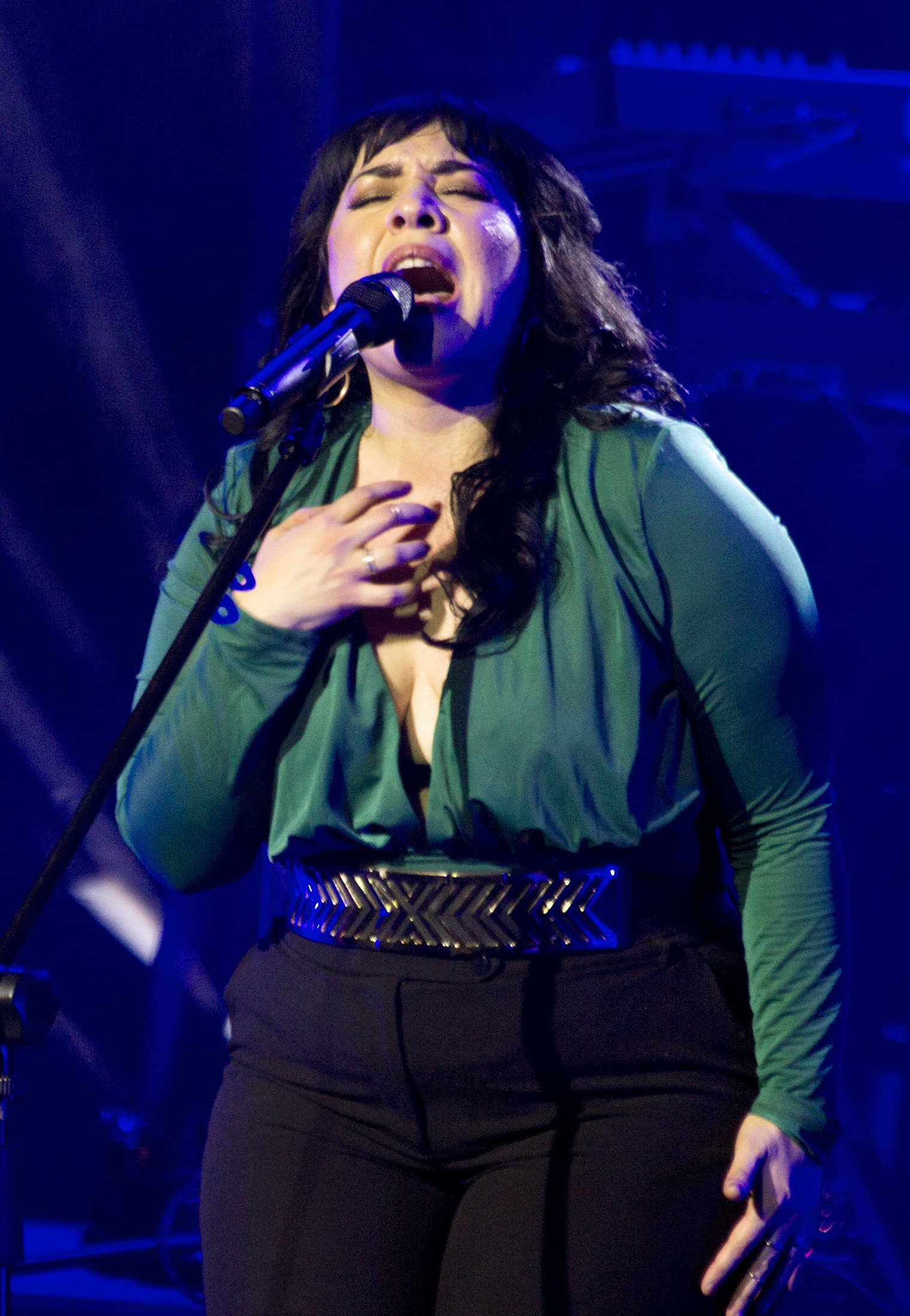
Two-time winner Carla Morrison.

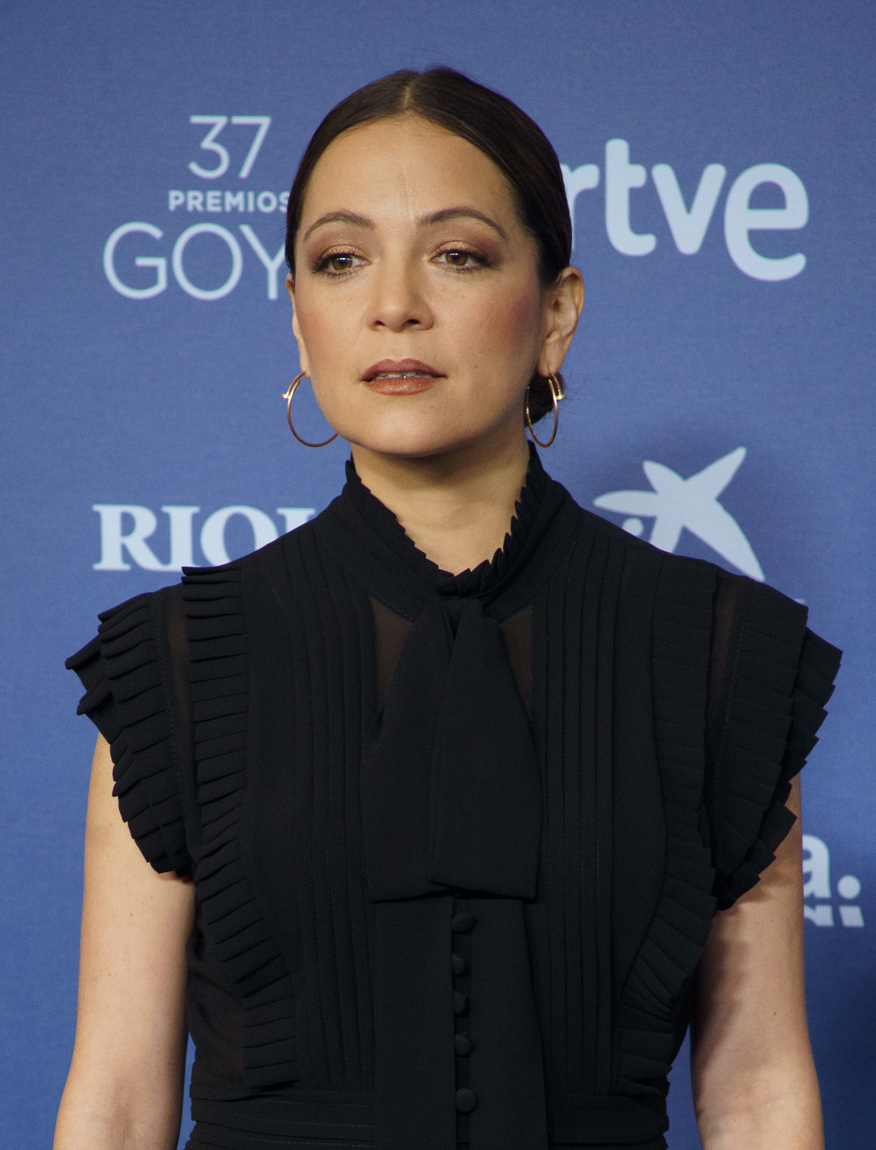
Two-time winner Natalia Lafourcade.

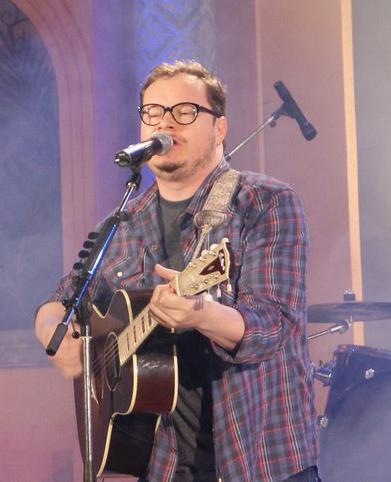
2015 winner Leonel García.

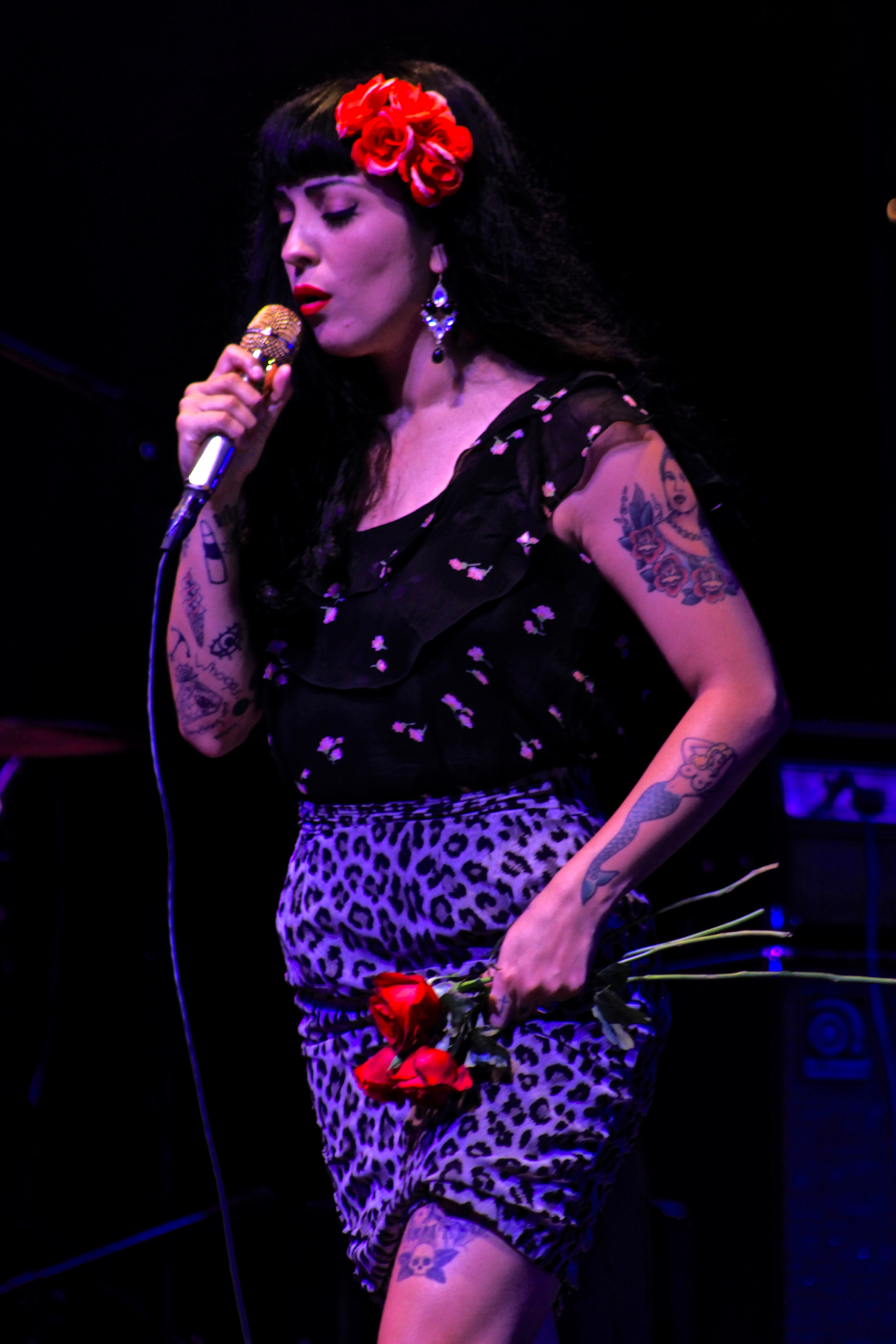
2017 winner Mon Laferte.

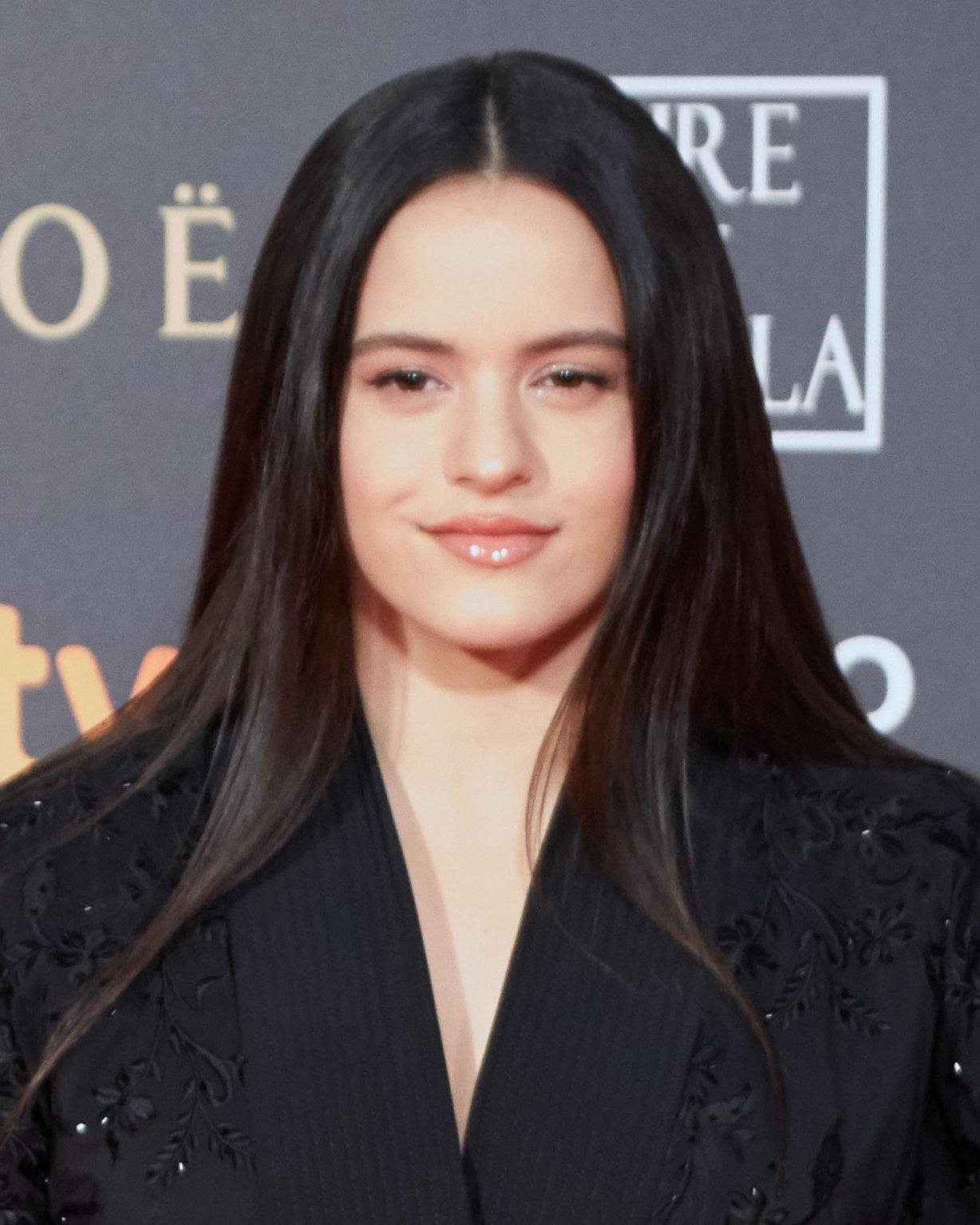
2018 winner Rosalía.

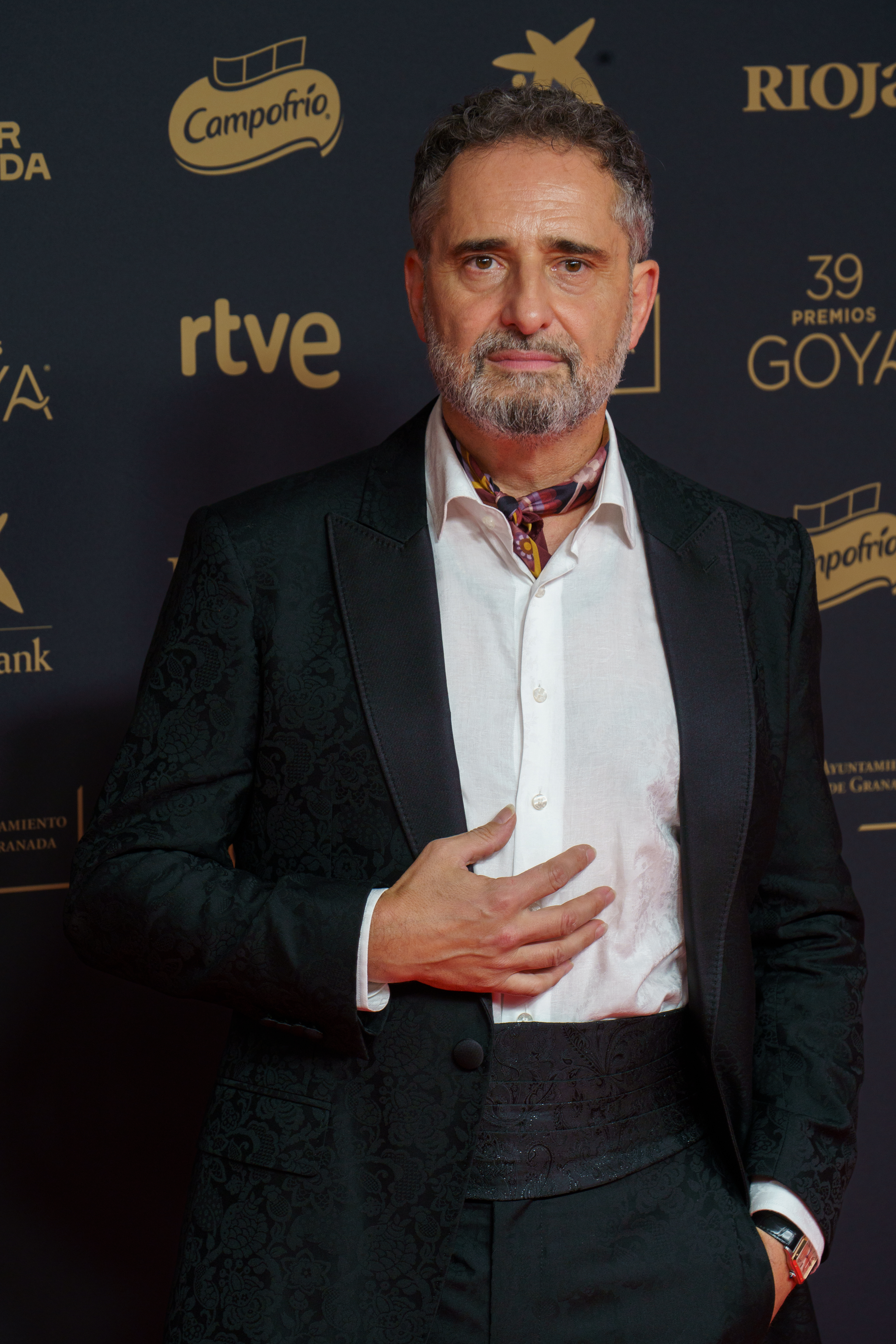
Three-time winner Jorge Drexler.

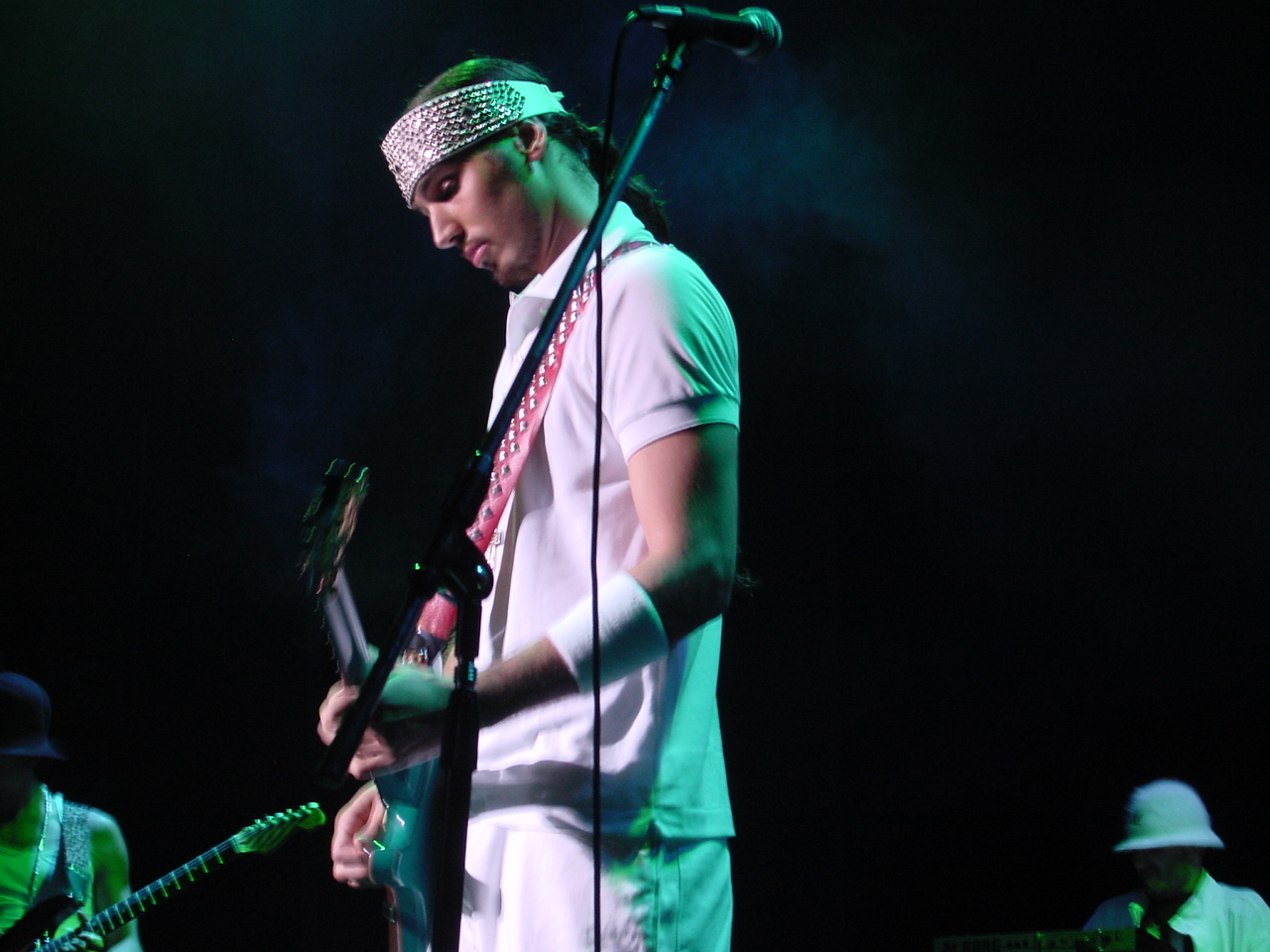
2023 winner Dante Spinetta.

Year	Songwriter(s)	Work	Performing artist(s)^{[II]}	Nominees	Ref.
2007	Manu Chao	"Me Llaman Calle"	Manu Chao	Kevin Johansen – "Anoche Soñé Contigo" (Kevin Johansen); Héctor Buitrago and Andrea Echeverri – "Complemento" (Aterciopelados); Vicentico – "El Arbol De La Plaza" (Vicentico); León Larregui – "No Me Destruyas" (Zoé)	
2008	Rubén Albarrán, Emmanuel del Real, Enrique Rangel & Joselo Rangel	"Volver a Comenzar"	Café Tacvba	J. L. Abreu, Marteen Andruet and Orlando Méndez – "Alguien" (Circo); Andrés Calamaro – "5 Minutos Más (Minibar)" (Andrés Calamaro); Juan Campodónico and Fernando Santullo – "El Mareo" (Bajofondo featuring Gustavo Cerati); Ximena Sariñana – "Normal" (Ximena Sariñana); María del Mar Rodríguez Carnero – "Papeles Mojados" (Chambao)	
2009	René Pérez, Eduardo Cabra, Rubén Albarrán, Emmanuel del Real, Enrique Rangel & Joselo Rangel	"No Hay Nadie Como Tú"	Calle 13 featuring Café Tacvba	Fernando Burgos, Gabriel Galvan and Denise Gutierrez – "Bestia" (Hello Seahorse!); Cucu Diamantes, Andrés Levin, Beatriz Luengo and Yotuel Romero – "Más Fuerte" (CuCu Diamantes); Camila Moreno – "Millones" (Camila Moreno); Daniel 'Mono Loco' Carbonell, Jules Bikôkô, Miki Ramirez, Tomas Tirtha Rundquist, DJ Helios, Didak Fernandez and Steffan Rundquist – "Moving" (Macaco); Alex Pérez and Juan Son – "Nada" (Juan Son)	
2010	Gloria "Goyo" Martinez, Miguel "Slow" Martinez & Carlos "Tostao" Valencia	"De Donde Vengo Yo"	ChocQuibTown	Fernando Burgos, Gabriel Galvan and Denise Gutierrez – "Criminal" (Hello Seahorse!); Ceci Bastida – "Cuando Vuelvas a Caer" (Bastida); Roberto Musso – "El Hijo de Hernandez" (El Cuarteto de Nos); Gustavo Cortes, Ricardo Cortes and Nicolás González – "Resistencia Indigena" (Sig Ragga)	
2011	Rafa Arcaute & Calle 13	"Calma Pueblo"	Calle 13	Pascual Reyes – "Salgamos de Aquí" (San Pascualito Rey); Doctor Krápula – "Somos" (Doctor Krápula); DJ Blass and Fidel Nadal – "Te Robaste Mi Corazón" (Nadal); Sie7e – "Tengo Tu Love" (Sie7e)	
2012	Carla Morrison	"Déjenme Llorar"	Carla Morrison	Bebe – "Mi Guapo" (Bebe); Juan Campodónico and Jorge Drexler – "1987" (Campo); John King, Kinky and Mala Rodríguez – "Negro Día" (Kinky); Caetano Veloso – "Neguinho" (Gal Costa)	
2013	Bajofondo	"Pena En Mi Corazón"	Bajofondo	Leon Larregui – "Brillas" (Leon Larregui); Hello Seahorse! – "La Flotadera" (Hello Seahorse!); Illya Kuryaki and the Valderramas – "Monta El Trueno" (Illya Kuryaki and the Valderramas); Sig Ragga – "Pensando" (Sig Ragga)	
2014	Calle 13	"El Aguante"	Calle 13	Gustavo Cortés and Sig Ragga – "Chaplin" (Sig Ragga); Jesús Báez Caballero and Siddhartha – "El Aire" (Siddhartha); Adrián Rodríguez and Diego Rodríguez – "La Lanza" (Babasónicos); Yayo González – "Vamos A Morir" (Paté de Fuá featuring Catalina García)	
2015	Natalia Lafourcade & Leonel García	"Hasta la Raíz"	Natalia Lafourcade	Famasloop – "Allí Estás" (Famasloop); Andrés Nusser – "Caribbean" (Astro); Roberto Musso – "No Llora" (El Cuarteto de Nos); Javiera Mena – "Otra Era" (Javiera Mena)	
2016	Carla Morrison	"Vez Primera"	Carla Morrison	Gustavo Cortés, Ricardo Cortés and Nicolas González – "Ángeles y Serafines" (Sig Ragga); Vicentico – "Averno, El Fantasma" (Los Fabulosos Cadillacs); Felipe Antunes and Otávio Carvalho – "Deus" (Vitrola Sintética); Kevin Johansen – "Es Como El Día" (Kevin Johansen + The Nada)	
2017	Mon Laferte	"Amárrame"	Mon Laferte featuring Juanes	Sig Ragga – "Antonia" (Sig Ragga); Robert Musso – "Apocalipsis Zombi" (El Cuarteto de Nos); Rafael Arcaute and Residente – "Apocaliptico" (Residente); Stephen Marley and Danay Suárez – "Integridad" (Danay Suárez)	
2018	Antón Alvarez Alfaro, Pablo Diaz-Reixa & Rosalía	"Malamente"	Rosalía	León Larregui – "Azul" (Zoé); Guillermo Galván – "Consejo de Sabios" (Vetusta Morla); Andrea Echeverri – "Dúo" (Aterciopelados); Dante Spinetta – "Mi Vida" (Dante Spinetta)	
2019	David Julca, Jonathan Julca, Los Amigos Invisibles, Silverio Lozada & Servando Primera	"Tócamela"	Los Amigos Invisibles	El David Aguilar – "Causa Perdida" (El David Aguilar); Ismael Cancel and ILe – "Contra Todo" (ILe); Kevin Johansen – "Cuentas Claras" (Kevin Johansen); Adrián Dárgelos Rodríguez – "La Pregunta" (Babasónicos)	
2020	Ismael Cancel, ILe & Natalia Lafourcade	"En Cantos"	ILe & Natalia Lafourcade	Rafa Arcaute, Pedro Campos and Nathy Peluso – "Buenos Aires" (Nathy Peluso); Wilberto Rodríguez – "Caracoles" (Cultura Profética); Eruca Sativa – "Carapazón" (Eruca Sativa); Mon Laferte – "Chilango Blues" (Mon Laferte)	
2021	Alizzz, C. Tangana & Jorge Drexler	"Nominao"	C. Tangana and Jorge Drexler	Rafa Arcaute, Pedro Campos & Nathy Peluso – "AGARRATE" (Nathy Peluso); Andrea Echeverri – "Antidiva" (Aterciopelados); Gepe – "Confía" (Gepe & Vicentico); Omar Apollo, Rafa Arcaute, C. Tangana & Federico Vindver – "Te Olvidaste" (C. Tangana & Omar Apollo)	
2022	Rafa Arcaute, Jorge Drexler & Federico Vindver	"El Día que Estrenaste el Mundo"	Jorge Drexler	Ca7riel & Tomas Sainz – "Bad Bitch" (CA7RIEL); Alejandro Pérez, Siddhartha & Rul Velázquez – "00:00" (Siddhartha); Yemi Alade, Carles Campi Campón, José Castillo, Jeff Peñalva, Liliana Saumet & Magdelys Savigne – "Conexión Total" (Bomba Estéreo & Yemi Alade); Ricardo Mollo, Omar Varela, WOS & Facundo Yalve – "Culpa" (WOS featuring Ricardo Mollo); Larry Gold, Noah Goldstein, Chad Hugo, Rosalía, David Rodríguez, Jacob Sherman, Michael Uzowuru, Pilar Vila Tobella, Dylan Wiggins & Pharrell Williams – "Hentai" (Rosalía)	
2023	Dante Spinetta	"El Lado Oscuro del Corazón"	Dante Spinetta	Sebastian Ayala, Daniel Briceño, Henry D'Arthenay, Rodolfo Pagliuca & Hector Tosta – "Aleros/Pompeii" (La Vida Bohème); Cami & Jonathan Julca – "ANASTASIA" (Cami); El David Aguilar – "Cicatriz Radiante" (El David Aguilar); Ismael Cancel, iLe & Mon Laferte – "Traguito" (iLe & Mon Laferte)	
2024	Devonté Hynes & Nathy Peluso	"El Día Que Perdí Mi Juventud"	Nathy Peluso	J Noa, Jeffrey Peñalva "Trooko" & Skai – "Cabecear" (J Noa); Francisco Rojas & Francisca Valenzuela – "Déjalo Ir" (Francisca Valenzuela); Goyo, Illmind, Omar Isaiah Lupuku, Don Mills, Carlos Santander & Telly – "Insomnia" (Goyo); Nicole Horts, Camilo Velez & Maria Vertiz – "Lloro" (Nicole Horts)	
2025	Rafa Arcaute, Gino Borri, Ca7riel & Paco Amoroso, Gale, Vicente Jiménez "Vibarco" & Federico Vindver	"#Tetas"	Ca7riel & Paco Amoroso	Salvador Colombo – "El Ritmo" (Bandalos Chinos); Javier Fernández Blanco, Pablo Gómez Cano, Roberto Gutierrez Acosta, Andrés De Las Heras, Judeline & Pablo López García – "Joropo" (Judeline); Latin Mafia – "Siento Que Merezco Más" (Latin Mafia); Paloma Morphy – "(Sola)" (Paloma Morphy)	
2026	Ben Aler, Carlos Casacuberta, Jorge Drexler, Manuel Lorente Freire "Spread Lof", Gabriel Lugo "Gabo", Jesús Martos Castillo "Presser", Mauro, Alberto Montenegro "Beto", PJ Sin Suela, Andrés Story & Mateo Sujatovich	"Ante la Duda, Baila"	Jorge Drexler	"Bugambilia" – Francisca Valenzuela & Francisco Victoria, songwriters (Francisca Valenzuela); "El Reset" – Dante Spinetta, songwriter (Dante Spinetta); "Querida Amalia" – Bruses, Alex Goose & Mauro Munoz, songwriters (Bruses); "1:30" – Aarón Cruz, Mon Laferte, Gabriel Puentes & Emilio Reyna, songwriters (Mon Laferte)	

- ^{^[I]} Each year is linked to the article about the Latin Grammy Awards held that year.
- ^{^[II]} The performing artist is only listed but does not receive the award.
- ^{^[III]} Showing the name of the songwriter(s), the nominated song and in parentheses the performer's name(s).

== See also ==
- Latin Grammy Award for Best Alternative Music Album
