= Panda discography =

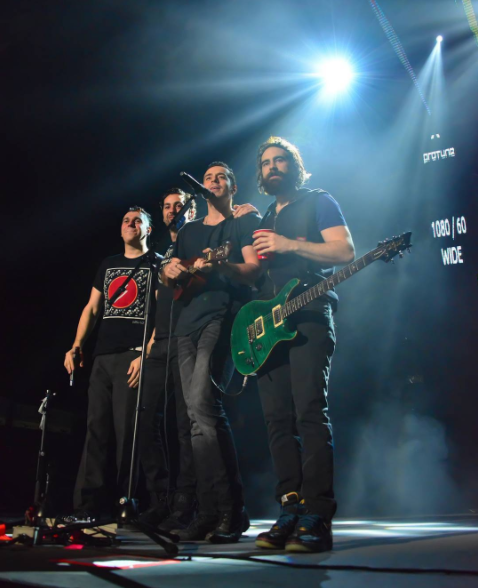
- Studio albums: 7
- EPs: 1
- Live albums: 2
- Compilation albums: 3
- Singles: 27
- Music videos: 27
- Demo albums: 1

The discography of Mexican rock band Panda consists of seven studio albums, one extended plays, two live albums, three compilation albums, one demo albums, twenty seven singles and twenty seven music videos.

== Albums ==
=== Studio albums ===
List of studio albums, with selected chart positions and certifications
Title	Album details	Peak chart positions			Certifications
Title	Album details	MEX	US Latin	US Latin Pop	Certifications
Arroz Con Leche	Released: September 25, 2000; Label: Movic; Formats: CD, LP, digital download, streaming	—	—	—	
La Revancha Del Príncipe Charro	Released: February 11, 2002 January 7, 2003 (US); Label: Movic; Formats: CD, LP, digital download, streaming	—	—	—	
Para ti con desprecio	Released: May 11, 2005 March 28, 2006 (US); Label: Movic, Warner; Formats: CD, LP, digital download, streaming	3	—	—	AMPROFON: Platinum
Amantes Sunt Amentes	Released: October 2, 2006 February 6, 2007 (US); Label: Movic, Warner; Formats: CD, LP, digital download, streaming	1	—	—	AMPROFON: Platinum+Gold
Poetics	Released: September 22, 2009 October 6, 2009 (US); Label: Movic, EMI; Formats: CD, LP, digital download, streaming	1	69	16	AMPROFON: Platinum
Bonanza	Released: March 16, 2012; Label: EMI; Formats: CD, LP, digital download, streaming	1	43	12	AMPROFON: Gold
Sangre Fría	Released: December 13, 2013 October 22, 2013 (US); Label: Universal Music; Formats: CD, LP, digital download, streaming	1	—	—	AMPROFON: Platinum+Gold
"—" denotes a release that did not chart or was not issued in that region.

=== Live albums ===
List of live albums, with selected chart positions and certifications
Title	Album details	Peak chart positions			Certifications
Title	Album details	MEX	US Latin	US Latin Pop	Certifications
Sinfonía Soledad	Released: November 30, 2007; Label: Movic, Warner; Formats: CD, DVD, digital download, streaming	3	—	—	AMPROFON: Platinum
Panda MTV Unplugged	Released: January 25, 2011; Label: EMI; Formats: CD, DVD, digital download, streaming	1	50	10	AMPROFON: Gold

=== Compilation albums ===
List of compilation albums
Title	Album details
2000-2004	Released: 2008; Label: Warner; Format: CD
2005-2008	Released: 2005–2008; Label: Warner; Format: CD
Todxs Somos Pxndx	Released: November 20, 2020; Label: Movic; Format: Digital download, streaming

=== Demo albums ===
List of demo albums
Title	Album details
Panda (Demo 1997)	Released: 1997; Label: Self-released; Format: CD

== Extended plays ==
List of extended plays
Title	EP details
Rarezas	Released: 2007; Label: Movic, Warner; Format: CD

== Singles ==
List of singles, with selected chart positions, showing year released and album name
Title	Year	Peak chart positions											Album
Title	Year	MEX	MEX 100	MEX Pop	MEX Rock	ARG	COL	ROM	SPA	US	US Latin	VEN	Album
"Buen Día"	2001	—	92	—	—	—	—	—	—	—	—	—	Arroz Con Leche
"Si Supieras"	2001	—	—	—	—	—	—	—	—	—	—	—	Arroz Con Leche
"Te Invito a Mi Fiesta"	2001	—	—	—	—	—	—	—	—	—	—	—	Arroz Con Leche
"Hola!"	2002	—	—	—	—	—	—	—	—	—	—	—	La Revancha Del Príncipe Charro
"Maracas"	2002	—	—	—	—	—	—	—	—	—	—	—	La Revancha Del Príncipe Charro
"Ya No Jalaba"	2002	—	—	—	—	—	—	—	—	—	—	—	La Revancha Del Príncipe Charro
"Quisiera No Pensar"	2003	—	—	—	—	—	—	—	—	—	—	—	La Revancha Del Príncipe Charro
"Cita en el Quirófano"	2005	—	—	—	—	—	—	—	—	—	—	—	Para ti con desprecio
"Cuando No Es Como Debería Ser"	2006	—	—	—	—	—	—	—	—	—	—	—	Para ti con desprecio
"Disculpa Los Malos Pensamientos"	2006	—	2	—	—	—	—	—	40	—	—	—	Para ti con desprecio
"Narcisista Por Excelencia"	2006	—	9	—	1	—	—	73	—	—	6	5	Amantes Sunt Amentes
"Los Malaventurados No Lloran"	2007	—	2	—	1	2	8	—	9	97	3	—	Amantes Sunt Amentes
"Procedimientos Para Llegar a Un Común Acuerdo"	2007	—	54	—	1	—	—	—	—	—	—	—	Amantes Sunt Amentes
"Pathetica"	2007	—	—	—	—	—	—	—	—	—	—	—	Sinfonía Soledad
"Nunca Nadie Nos Podrá Parar"	2008	—	—	—	—	—	—	—	—	—	—	—	Sinfonía Soledad
"Sólo A Terceros"	2009	14	12	11	35	—	—	—	—	—	—	—	Poetics
"Adheridos Separados"	2009	—	33	31	—	—	—	—	—	—	—	—	Poetics
"Nuestra Aflicción"	2010	—	17	—	—	—	—	—	—	—	—	—	Poetics
"Feliz Cumpleaños"	2010	35	21	19	—	—	—	—	—	—	—	—	Panda MTV Unplugged
"Los Malaventurados No Lloran"	2011	—	—	—	—	—	—	—	—	—	—	—	Panda MTV Unplugged
"Envejecido en Barril de Roble"	2012	31	17	14	—	—	—	—	—	—	—	—	Bonanza
"Romance en Re Sostenido"	2012	—	43	23	—	—	—	—	—	—	—	—	Bonanza
"La Noche de la Mesa Triste"	2012	—	—	—	—	—	—	—	—	—	—	—	Bonanza
"Enfermedad en Casa"	2013	—	99	—	—	—	—	—	—	—	—	—	Sangre Fría
"Saludos Desde Turquía"	2014	—	95	—	—	—	—	—	—	—	—	—	Sangre Fría
"Usted"	2014	—	99	—	—	—	—	—	—	—	—	—	Sangre Fría
"Libre Pastoreo"	2014	—	—	—	—	—	—	—	—	—	—	—	Sangre Fría
"—" denotes a release that did not chart or was not issued in that region.

== Guest appearances ==
Title	Year	Album
"Muñeca"	2005	Nuevos Tiempos Viejos Amigos
"Quisiera No Pensar"	2005	Nuevos Tiempos Viejos Amigos
"Si Esto Fuese Realidad"	2006	Skimo soundtrack
"Hasta el Final"	2006	Skimo soundtrack
"No Te Deseo el Mal... Pero Tampoco Te Deseo el Bien"	2006	Un mundo maravilloso
"Nunca Nadie Nos Podrá Parar"	2007	Para Los Fans
"Oro"	2007	Tributo Al Mas Grande
"La Célula Que Explota"	2010	Nos Vamos Juntos”: Un tributo a las canciones de Caifanes y Jaguares
"Tumble" (with Charming Liars)	2015	Non-album singles

== Music videos ==
- Buen Día (2000)
- Si Supieras (2000)
- Te Invito a mi Fiesta (2001)
- Hola! (2002)
- Maracas (2002)
- Ya no Jalaba (2003)
- Quisiera no Pensar (2003)
- Cita en el Quirófano (2005)
- Cuando no es Como Debiera Ser (2005)
- Disculpa los Malos Pensamientos (2006)
- Narcisista por Excelencia (2006)
- Los Malaventurados no Lloran (2007)
- Procedimientos Para Llegar a un Común Acuerdo (2007)
- Nunca Nadie Nos Podrá Parar (Gracias) (2007)
- Muñeca (Sinfonía Soledad) (2008)
- Solo a Terceros (2009)
- Adheridos Separados (2009)
- Nuestra Aflicción (2010)
- Feliz Cumpleaños (MTV Unplugged) (2010)
- Los Malaventurados no Lloran (MTV Unplugged) (2011)
- Envejecido en Barril de Roble (2012)
- Romance en Re Sostenido (2012)
- La Noche de la Mesa Triste (2012)
- Enfermedad En Casa (2013)
- Saludos Desde Turquía (2014)
- Usted (2014)
- Libre Pastoreo (2014)
