= José Madero =

Mexican musician

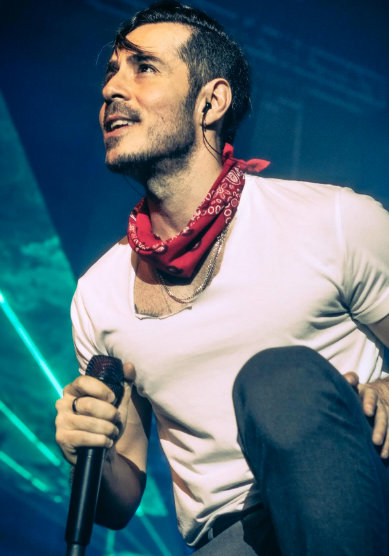
- José Madero in 2025

Background information
- Born: September 1, 1980 (age 46); Monterrey, Nuevo León, México
- Genres: Folk rock Indie rock Pop rock Alternative rock
- Occupations: Musician, songwriter, producer, writer
- Instruments: Guitar, acoustic guitar, piano, ukulele
- Years active: 1996–present
- Label: Universal Music
- Formerly of: PXNDX
- Website: https://classmusic.com.mx/pages/jose-madero

José Madero Vizcaíno (born September 1, 1980), better known as Pepe Madero, is a Mexican singer and writer. Madero began his musical career as a vocalist in the renowned Mexican rock band PXNDX. However, since 2016 he has mainly dedicated himself to his solo career.

== Early life ==
Originally from the city of Monterrey, but has lived his entire life in San Pedro Garza García, Nuevo León. There, he became familiar from a young age with different rock genres, from glam rock to punk rock, grunge and alternative rock. His taste for this music led him to learn to play the guitar. After several changes in styles and lineup, PXNDX would emerge in 1996.

He studied law at the Instituto Tecnológico y de Estudios Superiores de Monterrey (ITESM), from which he graduated in 2003. However, his passion for music forced him to put his professional career aside.

== Personal life ==
In addition to songwriting, Madero has ventured into the world of writing, in which he has three published books. His first book Pensándolo bien, pensé mal ("Thinking it right, I thought wrong") in 2014, which consists of a recounting of personal and musical anecdotes that he lived. Two years later, in 2016, he would release his second book titled Odio Odiar ("I Hate to Hate"), which features a collection of essays on various topics that question the intellectual hierarchy of the human race. Pesadillas para cenar ("Nightmares for Dinner") is the title of his third book. It is a horror book for children that was released on September 14, 2018.

Currently, José Madero presents the podcast Dos Nombres comunes (English: "Two Common Names") every week in the company of Swedish businessman Andreas Östberg.

== Discography ==
=== As a member of PXNDX ===
- Arroz con leche (2000)
- La Revancha Del Príncipe Charro (2002)
- Para ti con desprecio (2005)
- Amantes Sunt Amentes (2006)
- Sinfonía Soledad (2007)
- Poetics (2009)
- Panda MTV Unplugged (2010)
- Bonanza (2012)
- Sangre Fría (2013)

=== As a soloist ===
- Carmesí (2016) (es)
- Noche (2017) (es)
- Alba (2018) (es)
- Psalmos (2019) (es)
- Giallo (2022) (es)
- Aurora (EP) (2023) (es)
- Sarajevo (2024) (es)
- Querido... (2026)
