= Ricardo Treviño =

Mexican musician and entrepreneur (born 1980)

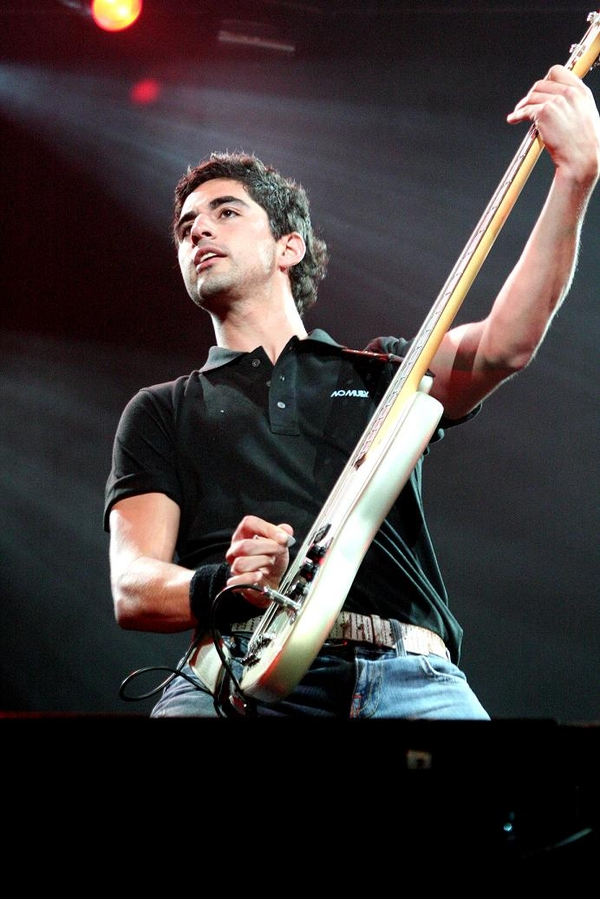

Background information
- Birth name: Ricardo Treviño
- Born: 17 May 1980 (age 45); Mexico
- Occupation: Musician
- Instrument: Bass guitar

Ricardo Treviño Chapa, also known as RickyTreCh, is a musician, songwriter, and entrepreneur. He is known for being the bassist of the Mexican rock band PXNDX (Panda). and a founding member of Desierto Drive, Suprema Corte del Norte, and Nadiescucha. Treviño has also co-founded the merchandising company Negro Pasión, which provides official merchandise for Latin American artists.

== Early life and career ==
Ricardo Treviño was born in Monterrey, Nuevo León, Mexico. He co-founded the rock band Panda (stylized as PXNDX) in 1996 alongside José Madero, Jorge Luis Garza, and Jorge Vázquez, initially playing covers of popular rock songs before transitioning into writing original music. Panda gained popularity with their blend of punk rock, alternative rock, and pop-punk.

== Panda (1996–2016) ==
Panda was a defining chapter in Treviño's career. The band released seven albums, including Para ti con desprecio (2005) and Amantes Sunt Amentes (2006), establishing their place as one of the most recognized Latin rock bands. Treviño's bass playing contributed to hits such as "Los Malaventurados No Lloran", "Cita en el quirófano" and "Narcisista por excelencia".

In recognition of his contributions to the band, Treviño received multiple award nominations. Notably, he was nominated for Best Rock Album by a Duo or Group with Vocal at the 9th Annual Latin Grammy Awards for Panda's live album Sinfonía Soledad. In addition, he earned a nomination at the 50th Annual Grammy Awards for Best Latin Rock or Alternative Album for Amantes Sunt Amentes.

Despite facing accusations of plagiarism in the mid-2000s, Panda continued to thrive, performing internationally and achieving gold and platinum record sales. Their final concert in 2016 at Arena Ciudad de México marked the end of an era, as the band announced an indefinite hiatus. Reflecting on Panda's success, Treviño emphasized the band’s dedication to guitar-driven rock music

== Desierto Drive (2018–present) ==
In 2018, after Panda's still-to-date hiatus, Ricardo Treviño, along with Arturo Arredondo and Jorge Vázquez, formed the band Desierto Drive. Their debut album, Mexican Dream, was released in 2019 and showcased a variety of genres, including punk, funk, mariachi, and bolero. The band marked a new creative direction for Treviño and his bandmates

Desierto Drive has received positive feedback for its diverse musical style, with the band continuing to record and perform. Their second album, Historias Live, highlights their evolving sound and blends alternative rock with Mexican cultural influences. Desierto Drive maintains a presence in the Mexican rock scene

== Solo career as Trekk ==
During PXNDX’s break, Ricardo Treviño began a solo career under the name Trekk. In 2017, he released the single "Contigo Soñar," which featured a combination of power ballad and rock elements. The track was part of his solo album El Viejo Lobo de Mar, a project inspired by his travels and musical development. His solo work allowed him to explore different facets of his artistry while maintaining his rock roots.

== Negro Pasión ==
Ricardo Treviño co-founded Negro Pasión, a merchandising company that supports Latin American artists. The company, created in collaboration with Arturo Arredondo and Andrés Farías, provides a platform for musicians to sell official merchandise. The company represents artists such as Insite, Aleks Syntek, and The Warning among others.

Negro Pasión was established to provide musicians with a sustainable way to monetize their work. The company has worked with indie bands, such as División Minúscula, to successfully launch merchandise lines.

== Legacy and influence ==
Ricardo Treviño’s contributions to Latin American rock include his work with Panda, Desierto Drive, Trekk, Nadiescucha, Suprema Corte del Norte and his ventures with Negro Pasión. As a bassist, songwriter, and entrepreneur, Treviño continues to be active in the music industry and the business side of entertainment.
