= Poetics (disambiguation) =

Poetics is the theory of literary discourse.

Poetics may also refer to:

- Poetics (album), a 2009 pop punk album
- Poetics (Aristotle), the earliest surviving work of dramatic theory
- Cognitive poetics, a school of literary criticism that applies the principles of cognitive science to the interpretation of literary texts
- Descriptive poetics, a form of literary criticism
- Historical poetics, a scholarly approach to film studies outlined in a book by David Bordwell
- Poetics, an academic journal published by Elsevier
- Structuralist Poetics, a book of critical literary theory by Jonathan Culler
- The Poetics of Space, a book about architecture by the French philosopher Gaston Bachelard

== See also ==
- Poetry (disambiguation)
