= Arturo Arredondo =

Mexican guitarist and composer

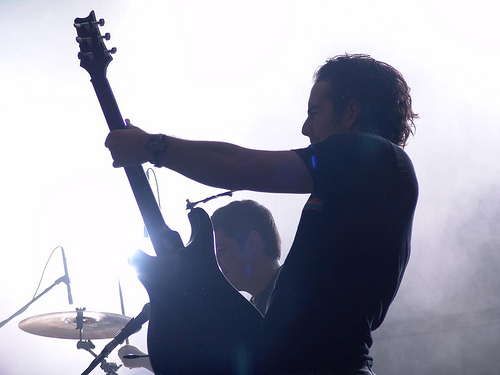
- Arturo Arredondo
- Born: March 23, 1983 (age 43); Monterrey, Mexico
- Known for: Guitarist of Panda (band), Vocalist, Composer, Producer
- Notable work: Amantes Sunt Amentes (2006); Bonanza (Panda album) (2012); Poetics (album) (2009)
- Website: https://negropasioncom (Co-owner)

Arturo Arredondo (born March 23, 1983), known by stage name Arthur White, is a Mexican musician, composer, vocalist and producer, best known as the guitarist and vocalist of the PANDA. He is also a founding member and vocalist of Desierto Drive. Arturo has also co-founded the merchandising company Negro Pasión, an online shop based on selling official merchandise for Latin American artists

== Biography ==
Arturo Arredondo was born on March 23, 1983, in Monterrey. He was found of music from a very young age. At a very young age he formed a musical group called Super Asfalto but soon the group separated. He joined PANDA with the third album of the band Para ti con desprecio (2005), and stayed with the band till the last album Sangre Fría (2013).

== PXNDX (2004–2016) ==
PXNDX was a defining chapter in Arturo's career. The band released seven studio albums, including Para ti con desprecio (2005) and Amantes Sunt Amentes (2006), establishing their place as one of the most recognized Latin rock bands. Arturo's guitar playing contributed to hits such as “Los Malaventurados No Lloran”, ”Cita en el Quirófano" and "Narcisista por Excelencia".

In recognition of his contributions to the band, Arturo received multiple award nominations. Notably, he was nominated for Best Rock Album by a Duo or Group with Vocal at the 9th Annual Latin Grammy Awards for PXNDX's live album Sinfonía Soledad. In addition, he earned a nomination at the 50th Annual Grammy Awards for Best Latin Rock or Alternative Album for Amantes Sunt Amentes.

Despite facing multiple plagiarism accusations in the mid-2000s, PXNDX continued to thrive, performing internationally and achieving gold and platinum record sales due to a solid fan base. Their final concert in 2016 at Arena Ciudad de México marked the end of an era, as the band announced an indefinite hiatus in 2016.

== Desierto Drive (2018–present) ==
After PXNDX's still to date hiatus, Arturo, along with Ricardo Treviño and Jorge Vázquez, formed the indie band Desierto Drive. Mexican Dream, was their first released in 2019 and explored a variety of genres, including punk, funk, and mariachi. Desierto Drive has received positive feedback for its diverse musical style, with the band continuing to record and perform. Historias Live, their second album, highlights their evolving sound and blends alternative rock with Mexican cultural influences.

== Albums ==
Since his separation from PANDA he performs by his stage name Arthur White. In 2017 Arthur White released his first solo album, an EP called Ego Pop which consists of 6 songs and ranked number 1 on iTunes Mexico.

In 2018, he released his second EP titled Somnofobia, which features six tracks. The track “Monstruos Xtraños” was released as the first single, with an accompanying music video, which is available on YouTube.

== Singles ==
He occasionally releases singles on his YouTube channel that includes: Reflejos, Abnormal, Vicios, Fría Como El Viento, Valiente”, “robame pobreza”, “cuando nada te hace llorar”, and “mar de lagrimas”.

== Negro Pasión ==
Arturo Arredondo alongside Ricardo Treviño and Andres Farias co-founded Negro Pasión, a merchandising company that supports Latin American artists. The company provides a platform for musicians to sell their own official merchandise. The company represents artists such as Insite, Aleks Syntek, The Warning, among others.

Negro Pasión was established to provide musicians with a sustainable way to monetize their work. The company has worked with indie bands, such as División Minúscula, to successfully launch their online merchandise store.
