= Arts in Rome =

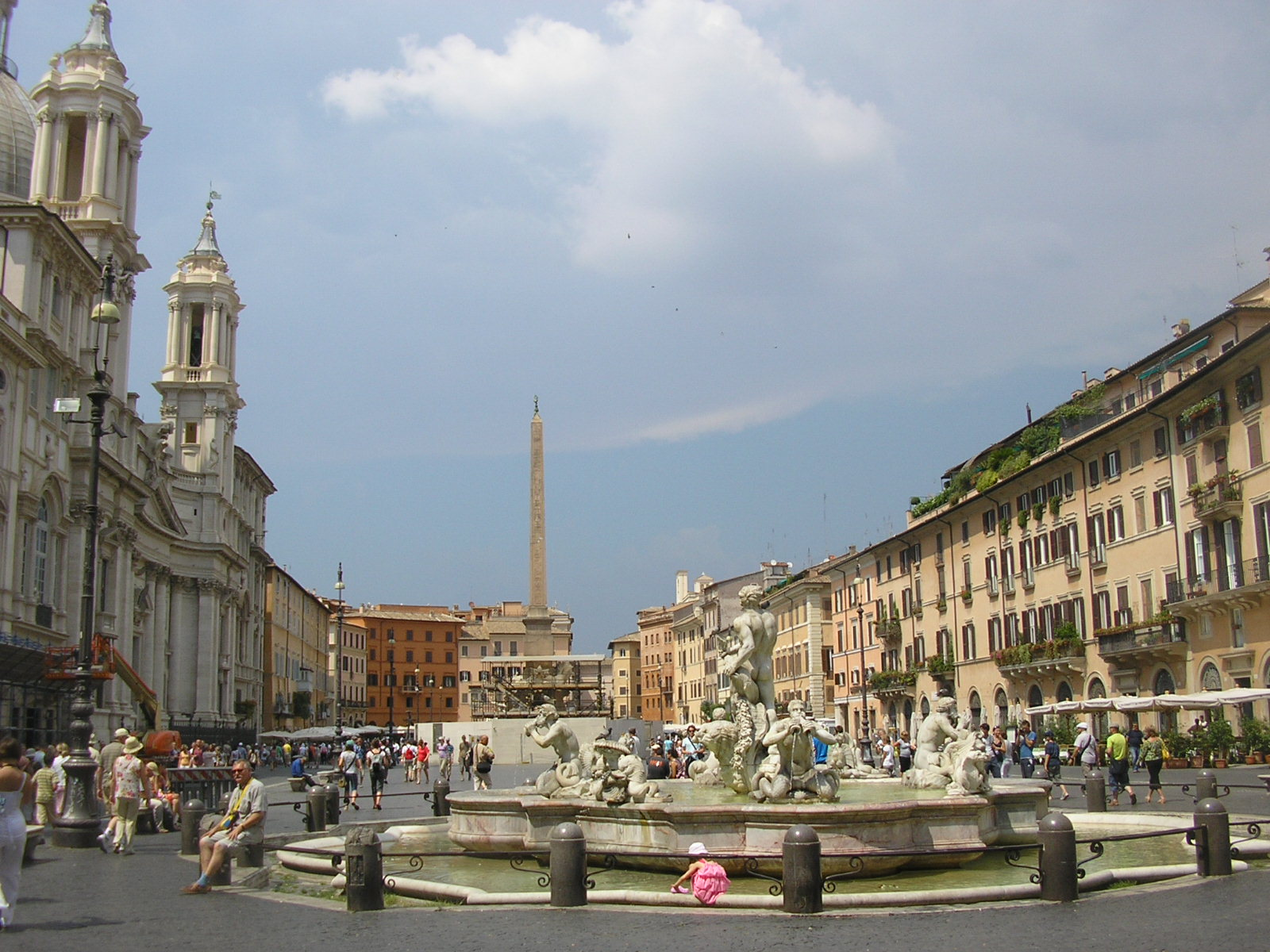
Rome's Piazza Navona.

Rome has for over two thousand years been one of the most important artistic centres in the world. Early Ancient Roman art initially developed from the Etruscan art slightly to its north, but from about 2000 BC, as the Roman Republic became involved with the Greek world, Ancient Greek art and architecture became the dominant influence, until the two effectively merged into a Greco-Roman style, often meaning Greek-speaking artists working for Latin-speaking patrons. Roman literature and philosophy was also centred on the capital.

Early Christian art and architecture largely developed in the Imperial capital, but the first centuries after the fall of the Western Empire were a relative low point. By 900 AD Rome had recovered much of its position as a leading centre, centred on the Papal court. The removal of the popes from the city in the Avignon Captivity (1309-76), and the city becoming a battleground between rival families of the Black nobility, led to another low period. But the city remained an important pilgrimage destination, and the capital of the significant Papal States, and after the return of the popes there was a considerable artistic revival, above all in the High Renaissance, when a series of art-loving popes gave the Vatican the works that remain world-famous, by artists such as Michelangelo and Raphael, who were mostly imported from elsewhere in Italy.

The leading position of Rome continued into the Roman Baroque, in both art and architecture, with figures such as Bernini and Caravaggio. By the 18th century there were fewer new buildings to design or decorate, and much of the artistic patronage in Rome came from foreign visitors on the Grand Tour, or pilgrimage. The Scuola Romana was a 20th-century group of painters, in a form of Expressionism.

The Papal court was an important innovator in music during the Renaissance, though later musical development was restricted because there was no opera house until the late 19th century, as cardinals were discouraged from attending opera performances. In a similar way, papal censorship meant that Italian publishing and literature mostly developed outside Rome. Once the national capital of Italy, new areas of the arts such as film production and fashion have developed.

== Architecture ==
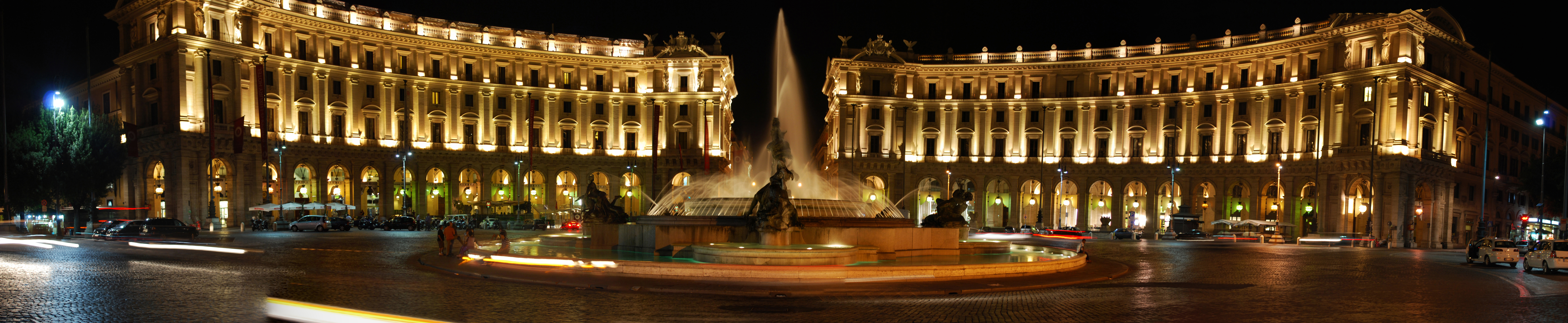
The neoclassical Piazza della Repubblica.

Rome has an eclectic cityscape, and the city's architecture includes many styles, from Ancient Roman and Medieval, to Renaissance, Baroque and Fascist.

== Art ==
Galleries of Rome, by Giovanni Paolo Pannini

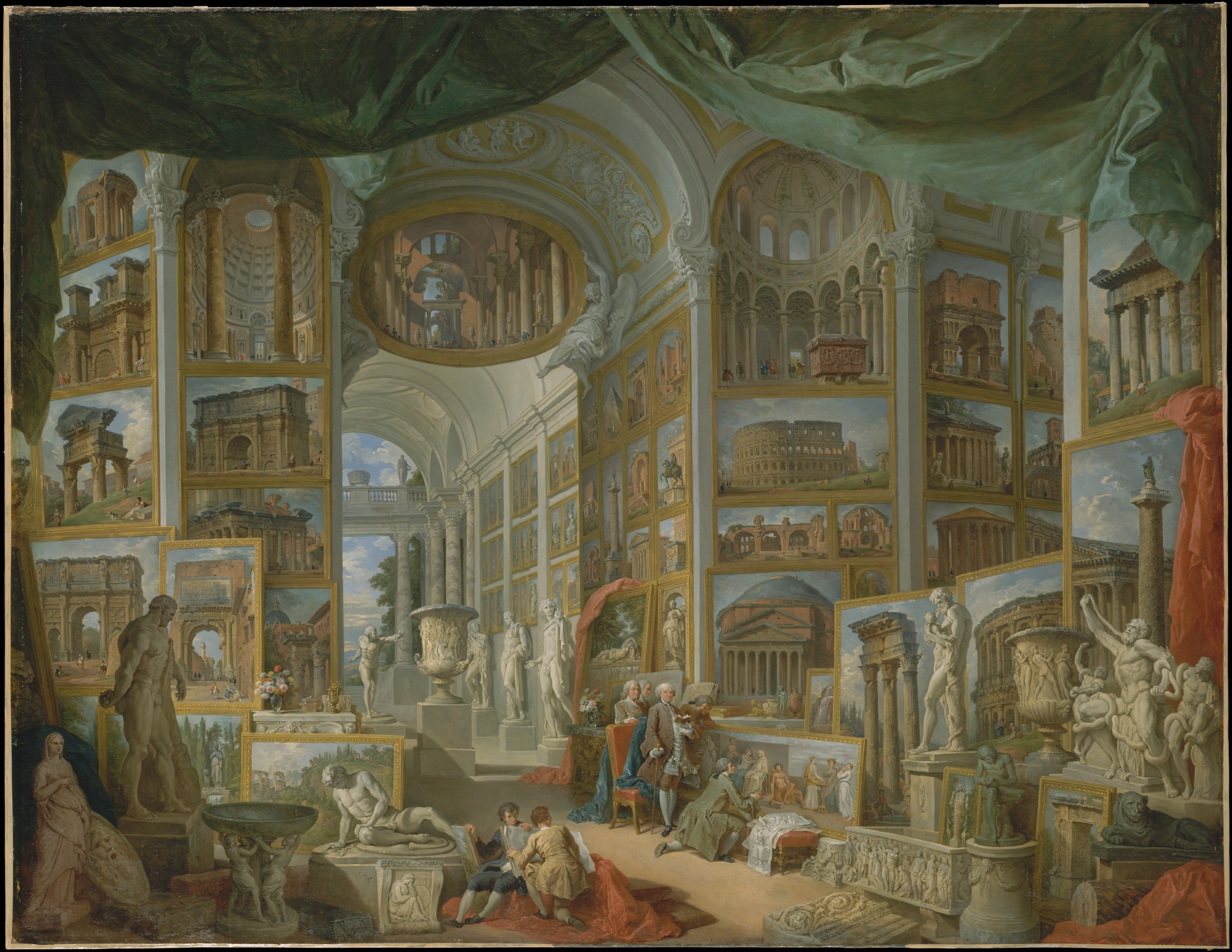
Gallery of ancient Rome

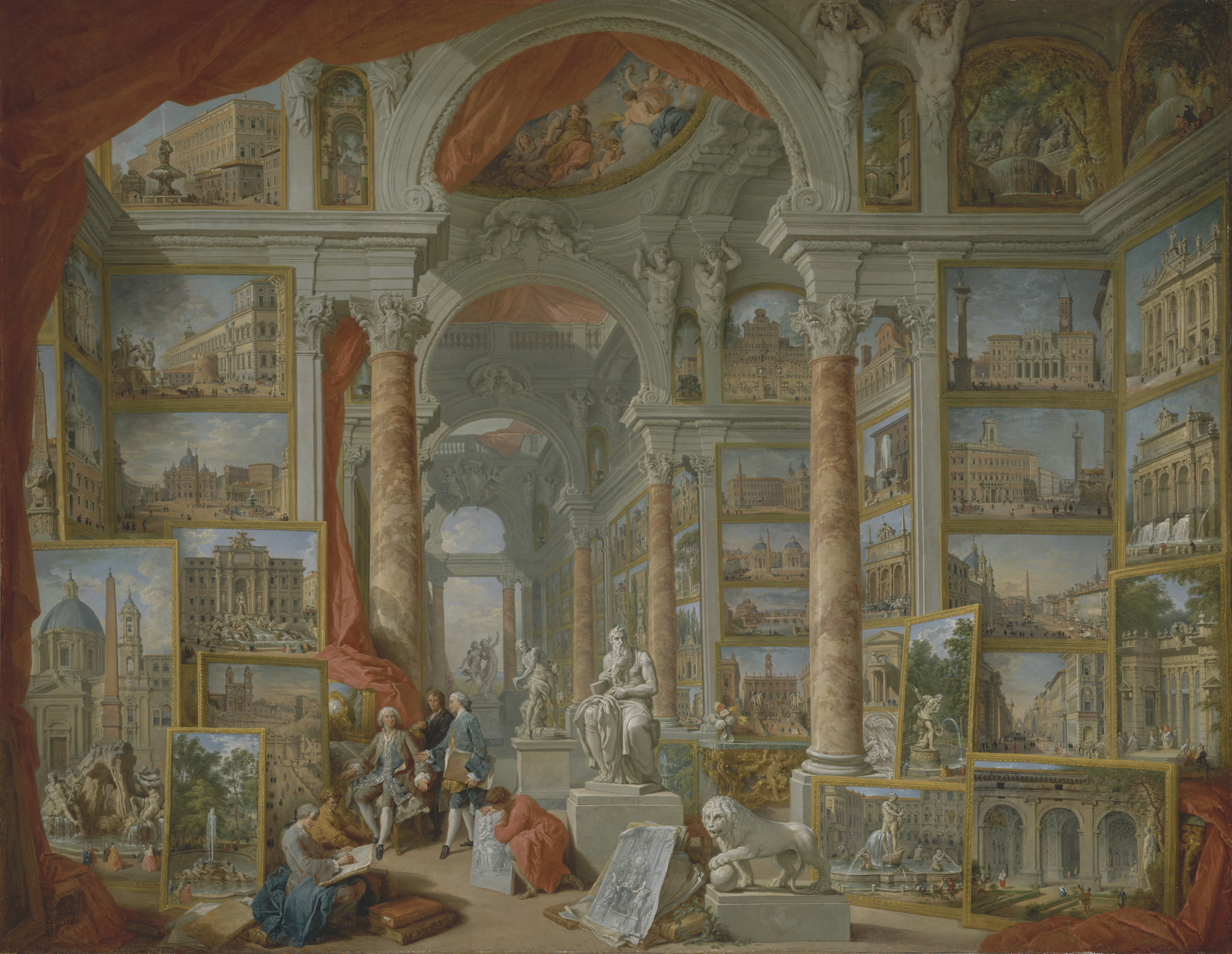
Gallery of modern Rome

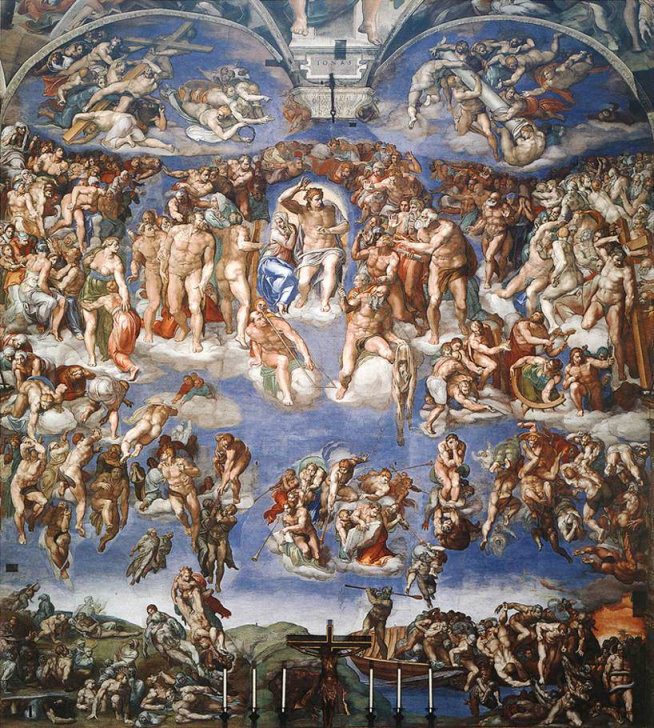
The Last Judgment by Michelangelo. Sistine Chapel. Vatican Museums.

The first Roman indigenous art forms, at the stage of the origins and the First Republic, were pretty basic and not very refined. With the contact with Greek civilization, Rome would have an ambivalent attitude towards the "superior" Greek art: appreciate its gradual forms, and will try contempt for authors, artists socially inferior Greeks against Roman conquerors (the same attitude was taken towards Greek philosophers and poets). Over the centuries Greek art will have a growing appreciation, although there are trends indigenous "anti-classic" that will be an element of continuity with the Romanesque style.

The Roman Renaissance was also arguably one of the most important styles in Roman artistic history. The Renaissance period changed Rome's face dramatically, with works like the Pietà by Michelangelo and the frescoes of the Borgia Apartment, all made during Innocent's reign. Rome reached the highest point of splendour under Pope Julius II (1503–1513) and his successors Leo X and Clement VII, both members of the Medici family. In this twenty-years period Rome became one of the greatest centres of art in the world. The city hosted artists like Ghirlandaio, Perugino, Botticelli and Bramante, who built the temple of San Pietro in Montorio and planned a great project to renovate the Vatican. Raphael, who in Rome became one of the most famous painters of Italy creating frescos in the Cappella Niccolina, the Villa Farnesina, the Raphael's Rooms, plus many other famous paintings. Michelangelo started the decoration of the ceiling of the Sistine Chapel and executed the famous statue of the Moses for the tomb of Julius. Rome lost in part its religious character, becoming increasingly a true Renaissance city, with a great number of popular feasts, horse races, parties, intrigues and licentious episodes. The city's had a fruitful and thriving economy, with the presence of several Tuscan bankers, including Agostino Chigi, who was a friend of Raphael and a patron of arts. Before his early death, Raphael also promoted for the first time the preservation of the ancient ruins.

Rome became one of Europe's major centres of Renaissance artwork, second only to Florence, and able to compare to other major cities and cultural centres, such as Paris and Venice. The city was affected greatly by the baroque, and Rome became the home of numerous artists and architects, such as Bernini, Caravaggio, Carracci, Borromini and Cortona, to name a few. In the late-18th century and early-19th century, the city was one of the centres of the Grand Tour, when wealthy, young English and other European aristocrats visited the city to learn about ancient Roman culture, art, philosophy and architecture. Rome hosted a great number of neoclassical and rococo artists, such as Pannini and Bernardo Bellotto. Today, the city is a major artistic centre, with numerous art institutes and museums.

Rome boasts numerous painters and artists, and as a worldwide artistic centre, numerous artists have visited or resided in the city. Examples include Bramante, (1444–1514), Raphael (1483–1520), Perugino (1450–1523), Michelangelo (1475–1564), Benvenuto Cellini (1500–71), Caravaggio (1571–1610), Bernini (1598–1680), Carlo Maderno (1556–1629), Rubens (1577–1640), Angelica Kauffman (1741–1807), Antonio Canova (1757–1821) and Dane Bertel Thorvaldsen (1770–1844).

== Cinema ==
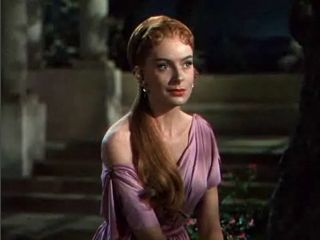
Deborah Kerr, who starred in Quo Vadis, a 1951 epic movie filmed in Rome

The Cinecittà studios are the biggest in Italy, and are believed to be the biggest in Europe. Rome's main studios were and still are amongst the most important in the world, hosting some of the greatest films of all time. They were built in 1937, and they rose to fame as the Neorealist films of the 1940s, for example Roberto Rossellini's Roma Città Aperta, and Vittorio De Sica Bicycle Thieves. Possibly Italy's greatest film director, Federico Fellini, was often associated with Cinecitta and Roman cinema, with his classic films La Dolce Vita of 1960, and Rome in 1971. Pier Paolo Pasolini was also a highly controversial director associated with the studios, with famous films such as Il Decamerone in 1971. The studios and the city have also been the settings for several foreign movies, such as Ben Hur, Gladiator, Gangs of New York, Quo Vadis, Spartacus and Roman Holiday.

== Music and the performing arts ==
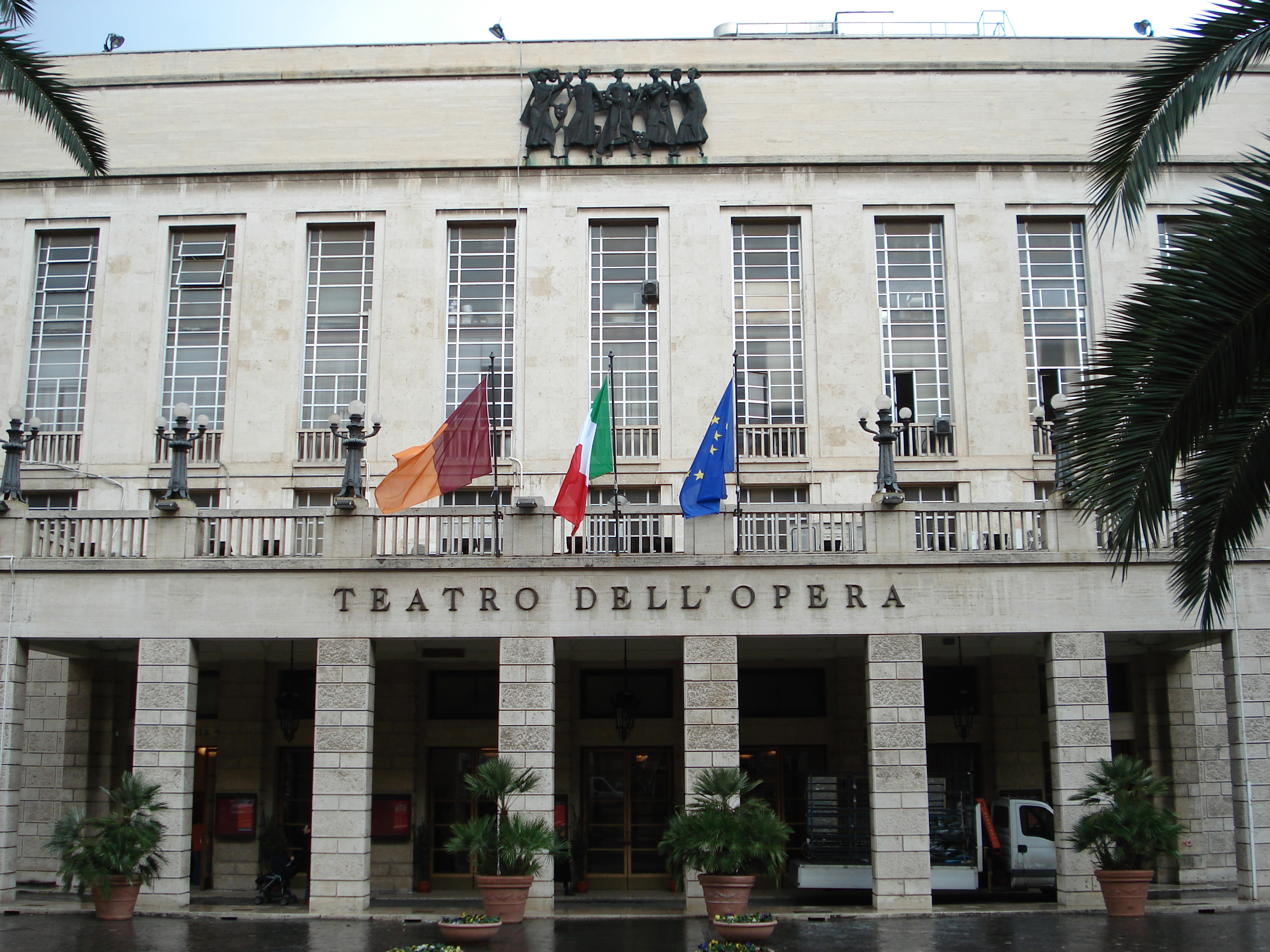
The Rome Opera house

The city is also an important centre for music, and it has an intense and thriving performing arts scene, including several prestigious music conservatories and theatres. It hosts the Accademia Nazionale di Santa Cecilia (founded in 1585), for which new concert halls have been built in the new Parco della Musica, one of the largest musical venues in the world. Rome also has an opera house, the Teatro dell'Opera di Roma, as well as several minor musical institutions. The city also played host to the Eurovision Song Contest in 1991 and the MTV Europe Music Awards in 2004.

Rome has also held several renowned composers and musicians, such as Giovanni Luigi da Palestrina (1525–94) and Gregorio Allegri, who composed Miserere

== Fashion ==
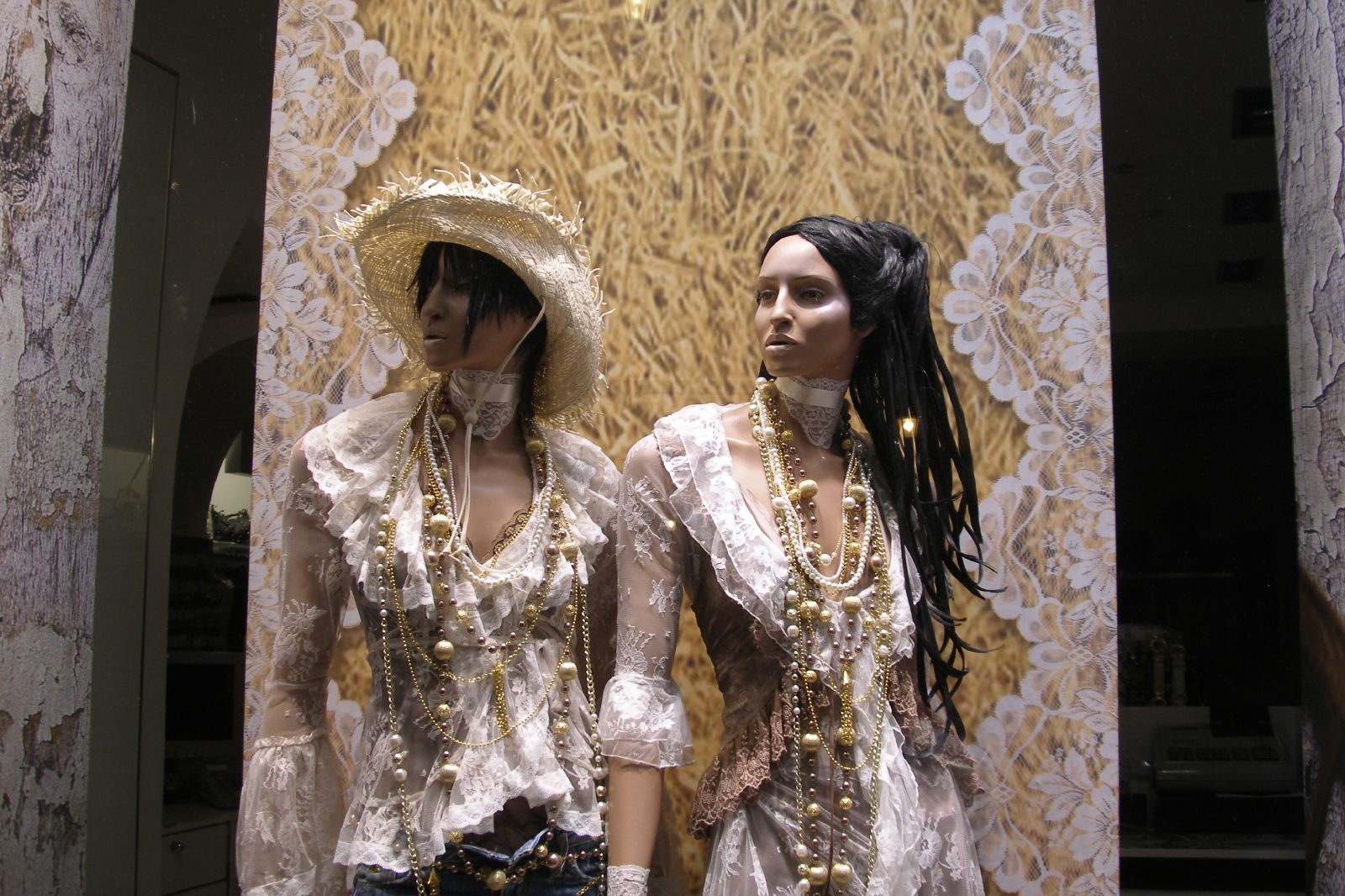
A Prada boutique in Via dei Condotti

Rome is widely recognized as a world fashion capital. Although not as important as Milan, Rome is the world's 4th most important center for fashion in the world, according to the 2009 Global Language Monitor after Milan, New York and Paris, and beating London. Major luxury fashion houses and jewelry chains, such as Bulgari, Fendi, Laura Biagiotti and Brioni (fashion), just to name a few, are headquartered or were founded in the city. Also, other major labels, such as Chanel, Prada, Dolce & Gabbana, Armani and Versace have luxury boutiques in Rome, primarily along its prestigious and upscale Via dei Condotti.

Via del Babuino and Via Margutta are also high-end shopping streets in the city. The Sorelle Fontana have a studio in Rome, which began in the 1930s and became a symbol of Rome's high fashion in the 1950s. Via Frattina and Via Borgognona are also fashionable streets which have a reputation of selling more modern clothes, and leather handbags.

== Bibliography ==
- Eyewitness Travel: Rome. DK. 2006. ISBN 1-4053-1090-1.
