= Poetry (disambiguation) =

Poetry is a form of literature.

Poetry, Poem(s), or Poetic(s) may also refer to:

== Literature ==
- Poems (Auden), three separate collections of the early poetry of W. H. Auden
- Poems (Agatha Christie), the second of two collections of poetry by Agatha Christie
- Poems (Emerson), a series of poems written in 1847 by Ralph Waldo Emerson
- Poems (William Golding), the first work by William Golding
- Poems (Hesse), a collection of 31 poems written by Hermann Hesse
- Poems (Wilfred Owen), a 1920 posthumous poetry collection
- Poems (Tennyson, 1842)
- Poems (William Carlos Williams), an early self-published volume of poems by William Carlos Williams
- Poems (Sextus Propertius), a 2018 collection of translated poems written by Sextus Propertius

== Music ==
- Poetics (album), a 2009 pop punk album
- Poem (album), a 2000 album by Canadian industrial/electronic music group Delerium
- "Poem" (song), a 2002 song by nu metal band Taproot
- Poetry (album), an album by Stan Getz and Albert Dailey
- "Poetry", a song by Danity Kane from their 2008 album platinum-selling album Welcome to the Dollhouse
- "Poetry", a song by Tamia from her 2004 album More
- Poème (Chausson), a composition for violin and orchestra
- Poèmes, a 2012 album by operatic soprano Renée Fleming
- "Bonus Poem", a song by Acid Bath from the 1996 album Paegan Terrorism Tactics
- "Dax's Poem", a song by Golgotha from the 1991 album Wet Dreams of the Insane.

== Other ==
- Poetics (Aristotle) (c. 335 BC), the earliest surviving work of dramatic theory
- Cognitive poetics, a school of literary criticism that applies the principles of cognitive science to the interpretation of literary texts
- Descriptive poetics, a form of literary criticism
- Historical poetics, a scholarly approach to film studies outlined in a book by David Bordwell
- Poetics, an academic journal published by Elsevier
- Per-oral endoscopic myotomy (POEM), a special surgery technique using endoscopy to operate inside the alimentary canal
- The Poem, a screenplay by Dawn Fields Wise about Lynchburg poet Bransford Vawter
- the IKEA Poäng chair, previously known as Poem
- Poetics, the theory of literary forms and literary discourse
- Poetics, a bimonthly peer-reviewed academic journal
- Poetry (film), a 2010 South Korean film directed by Lee Chang-dong
- Poetry (magazine), a journal published in Chicago since 1912
- Poetry, Georgia, an unincorporated community
- Poetry, Texas, an unincorporated community primarily in Kaufman County, Texas
- "Poetry", a poem by Marianne Moore
- A tool for packaging and dependency management in Python
- POEMS syndrome, a medical condition
