= Bonanza (Panda album) =

Studio album by Panda
- Released: March 16, 2012
- Recorded: October 2011
- Studio: DMY Studios; (Monterrey, Nuevo León)
- Genre: Alternative rock; pop punk; garage rock
- Length: 51:00
- Label: Movic; EMI
- Producer: Panda; Marcelo Treviño

Panda chronology
Poetics (2009)	Bonanza (2012)	Sangre Fría (2013)

Singles from Bonanza
- 1. "Envejecido en Barril de Roble" Released: 10 February 2012; 2. "La Noche de la Mesa Triste" Released: 17 February 2012; 3. "Color Negro Pasión" Released: 24 February 2012; 4. "La Vida en el Barandal" Released: 2 March 2012; 5. "Romance en Re Sostenido" Released: 15 June 2012

Bonanza is the sixth studio album by Mexican rock band Panda, released on 16 March 2012, through Movic and EMI Records. The album's name is an irony towards its songs' melancholy lyrics and frontman Jose Madero's desire to wrote them in a dramatic sense.

It was certified gold after selling over 30,000 copies in Mexico. The album turned to a "garage band" sound, following a leaning to their original pop punk sound they kickstarted in their first two albums, Arroz Con Leche and La Revancha Del Príncipe Charro, while maintaining an alternative rock presence on the entire record.

== Reception ==
=== Commercial performance ===
Bonanza debuted atop the Mexican Albums Chart, becoming the group's fifth album to reach that position, after Para Ti Con Desprecio (2005), Amantes Sunt Amentes (2006), Sinfonía Soledad (2007) and Poetics (2009). Several weeks after its debut on the chart, the album was certified Gold. On the United States, the album debuted at No. 43 on the Billboard Top Latin Albums chart, becoming their highest entry. On the Latin Pop Albums component chart, it reached No. 12, becoming their second highest-charting album on that list after Panda: MTV Unplugged (2010), which reached No. 10.

== Track listing ==
All lyrics are written by José Madero Vizcaíno; all music is composed by Panda

No.	Title	Length
1.	"Huésped en Casa Propia"	3:42
2.	"Las Mil y un Camas"	3:16
3.	"La Noche de la Mesa Triste"	4:20
4.	"Pensándolo Bien, Pensé Mal"	3:42
5.	"Color Negro Pasión"	4.04
6.	"Envejecido en Barril de Roble"	3:28
7.	"La Reina de Uxmal"	3:39
8.	"Bella en Mi Cabeza para Siempre"	4:20
9.	"Romance en Re Sostenido"	3:45
10.	"Ilusión, Oh Ilusión"	4:51
11.	"Consejo al Espejo"	4:25
12.	"Aforismos"	3:07
13.	"La Vida en el Barandal"	4:17
Total length:		51:00

== Personnel ==
Adapted from album liner notes:

- Primary Artist - Panda

== Charts ==
Chart	Peak position
Mexican Albums Chart	1
US Billboard Top Latin Albums	43

== Certifications ==
Region	Certification	Certified units/sales
Mexico (AMPROFON)	Gold	30,000^{^}
^{^} Shipments figures based on certification alone.

== Release history ==
Country	Date	Format(s)	Label
United States	March 16, 2012	Digital download	EMI Music
Mexico	March 16, 2012	Digital download	EMI Music
Spain	March 16, 2012	Digital download	EMI Music
Argentina	March 16, 2012	Digital download	EMI Music
