= Spillcam =

Spillcam was a live feed of the leak site of the Deepwater Horizon oil spill. The live footage first became available to the general public in May 2010 when BP was pressured by politicians to release the footage.

Staff of the Select Committee for Energy Independence and Global Warming working under Rep. Ed Markey uploaded the footage to the committee website on May 19. Within twenty-four hours, a million people had viewed it.

The Spillcam ceased to be operational in September 2010.

== Impact ==
The footage led lawmakers to accuse BP of misleading the public about the spill flow rate. On 3 June, the number of viewable vantage points available was increased from 1 to 12.

== Reception ==
The spillcam became an Internet sensation and at times received millions of views. In November 2010, "spillcam" topped the list of top words of 2010 on the Global Language Monitor's survey.

Writing in the Washington Post in May 2010, journalist Hank Stuever described the feed as compulsive but depressing viewing, stating: "You might find yourself thinking of spillcam even when you're not watching it. At dinner. In the shower."

In 2011, the Tribeca Festival honoured The BP Spillcam and Ed Markey in the Tribeca Disruptive Innovation Awards.
