= Arroz con leche =

Arroz con leche (meaning rice with milk) may refer to:

- The Spanish version of rice pudding
- "Arroz con leche" a Spanish children's song
- Arroz Con Leche (album), an album by Mexican rock band Panda
- Arroz con leche (1950 film), an Argentine comedy film
- Arroz con leche (TV series), a 2007 Venezuelan telenovela
- Arroz con leche, a 2009 Argentine comedy film starring Isabel Sarli
