= Carmesí =

Studio album by José Madero
- Released: 29 April 2016
- Genres: Alternative pop; pop rock; Folk rock; alternative rock
- Length: 50:08
- Labels: Universal Music; EMI
- Producer: José Madero

José Madero chronology
Carmesí (2016)	Noche (2017)

Singles from Carmesí
- 1. "Plural Siendo Singular" Released: 8 April 2016; 2. "La Noche de la Mesa Triste" Released: 19 August 2016; 3. "Literatura Rusa" Released: 30 January 2017

Carmesí (Spanish for "crimson") is the debut solo studio album by Mexican singer and songwriter José Madero, released on 29 April 2016, through Universal Music and EMI Records. In November of the same year, a Deluxe edition was released, which contains 5 extra songs: three covers, and two original songs that were left out of the album, plus a DVD that records the recording process of the album.

== Background ==
During Panda's hiatus, on 28 March 2016, Madero revealed on his social media the news of his first solo studio album, Carmesí, which he produced himself. A few weeks prior to this announcement, Madero had already released Lunes 28, a first taste of his solo work, but without providing further details. The album's composition had two stages: most of the songs were written between 2008 and 2010, but were never used for any Panda project, nor for any external projects. It was during the band's hiatus that Madero decided to take those songs and record them, along with others composed during 2015 specifically for the album. In total, the album contains 13 songs, which, according to him, don't deviate much from Panda's lyrical style, but do differ musically, as they experiment with new sounds, rhythms, and instruments.

== Musical style ==
For his part, Madero has stated that Carmesí's sound "is not rock" but that it also doesn't fit into conventional "pop," mentioning that" he hasn't yet managed to pinpoint a genre for it " but if he had to define it, he would call it alternative pop.

== Singles ==
Carmesí had three official promotional singles, thus excluding the song Lunes 28, which served to introduce the project to fans.

The album's first official single, "Plural Siendo Singular," was released on 8 April 2016, garnering over 3 million views on YouTube in its first month . It also became one of the top 10 most-played Spanish-language pop songs on Mexican radio during May and June, and reached the Top 30 General chart (including regional Mexican music and Anglo Pop) during the same months, according to Monitor Latino. In the same platform's year-end chart, the single ranked #38 among the 100 most-played pop songs in Mexico during 2016.

The album's second single is the song "Sinmigo," officially released on 19 August, both to radio and with an official music video. The video was filmed in Cumbres del Ajusco National Park in Mexico City and attempts to draw an analogy to what happened to the singer at an autograph signing in April 2016. The song also remained on the Mexican radio charts for several weeks, reaching number 64 on the list of the 100 most played pop songs on Mexican radio in 2016. It was the high radio rotation of these two singles that led monitorLATINO to name José Madero as the Revelation Artist Mexico of 2016.

The third and final single from Carmesí was "Literatura Rusa" (Russian Literature), released on 30 January 2017. Madero chose this song over other fan favorites, considering it one of the album's most accessible tracks, a very easy-to-listen-to pop ballad, and stating that it's one where he sings best. The accompanying video was filmed in El Paso, Texas, in September 2016 and is based on a short story by the singer's favorite author, Stephen King ("The Man Who Loved Flowers," included in the book Night Shift). The story, and therefore the video, has no relation to the song's lyrics, but it marks a clear beginning for Madero to add a touch of horror to his music videos, which is also present, albeit more subtly, in "Sinmigo" (Without Me).

== Track listing ==
=== Standard edition ===
All tracks are written by José Madero Vizcaíno except where noted.

No.	Title	Length
1.	"Lunes 28"	3:54
2.	"Con Ustedes, La Rocola Humana"	3:41
3.	"Literatura Rusa"	3:39
4.	"No Como El Filme"	4:05
5.	"Entre Comillas"	2:55
6.	"Plural Siendo Singular"	3:30
7.	"Abril"	4:31
8.	"Teo, El Gato Persa Rinde Su Declaración"	3:55
9.	"Puerto Partida (Soy Un Cobarde)"	4:28
10.	"Sinmigo"	3:27
11.	"El Mundo De Mi Almohada"	3:59
12.	"¿A Poco No?"	3:52
13.	"Siempre Tendremos Dallas"	4:12
Total length:		50:08

=== Deluxe edition ===
No.	Title	Writer(s)	Length
14.	"Conversaciones Sobre Anatomía"		4:17
15.	"Sólo Un Momento" (Vicentico cover)	Gabriel Julio Fernández Capello, Gerardo Horacio López	4:20
16.	"El Pájaro Vio El Cielo y Se Voló" (Los Auténticos Decadentes cover)	Jorge Aníbal Serrano	3:45
17.	"El Camino a Pie"		4:25
18.	"Monumental" (Husky cover)	Andrés Jesús Zablah Montes de Oca	3:23
Total length:			70:10

== Charts ==
Chart	Peak position
Mexican Albums Chart	2
