= Sólo A Terceros =

Single by Panda

from the album Poetics
- Released: 22 July 2009
- Recorded: February 2009
- Genre: Rock
- Length: 4:35 min.
- Label: Movic Records
- Songwriter(s): José Madero / Panda
- Producer(s): Panda, Marcelo Treviño

Panda singles chronology
"Nunca nadie nos podrá parar (Gracias)" (2007)	"Sólo A Terceros" (2009)	"Adheridos separados" (2009)

"Sólo a Terceros" (Only to Third Persons) is the first single of the Poetics album from Mexican rock band Panda. The single was initially promoted by playing it at a festival, and it was played for a second time in the city of Monterrey. It was announced on the band's drummer Jorge Vásquez's ("Kross") Twitter of that the band would play the new single that day.

The single was not released until 22 July at EXA.fm and the video released on 27 July in a MTV exclusive, in the Los 10+ pedidos program (meaning "The 10 most asked for"). The single "Sólo a Terceros" was the most requested song of 2009 in Northern Mexico and got the 3rd place in the Top 100 requested songs of 2009 in Central Mexico.

== Musical video ==
In the video, the band appears to be playing in a scenario they've never experienced before. A man and a woman are shown trying to say something to each other by the words of band's vocalist José Madero (because the woman doesn't want to give an explanation but her "heart" is just like the man's, and that's why they don't talk). In the video, José appears dressed as a Priest. but he confirms in an interview at an awards function that it was just the design of his clothes and not a costume. The video was directed by Rodrigo Guardiola, member of band Zoé.

== Charts ==
Chart (2009)	Peak position
Mexico (Top 100 Mexico)	12
Mexico Airplay (Billboard)	14
Mexico Espanol Airplay (Billboard)	11
Mexico Rock (Top 100 Mexico)	35
