= Fashion tourism =

Form of tourism about shopping in various clothing stores

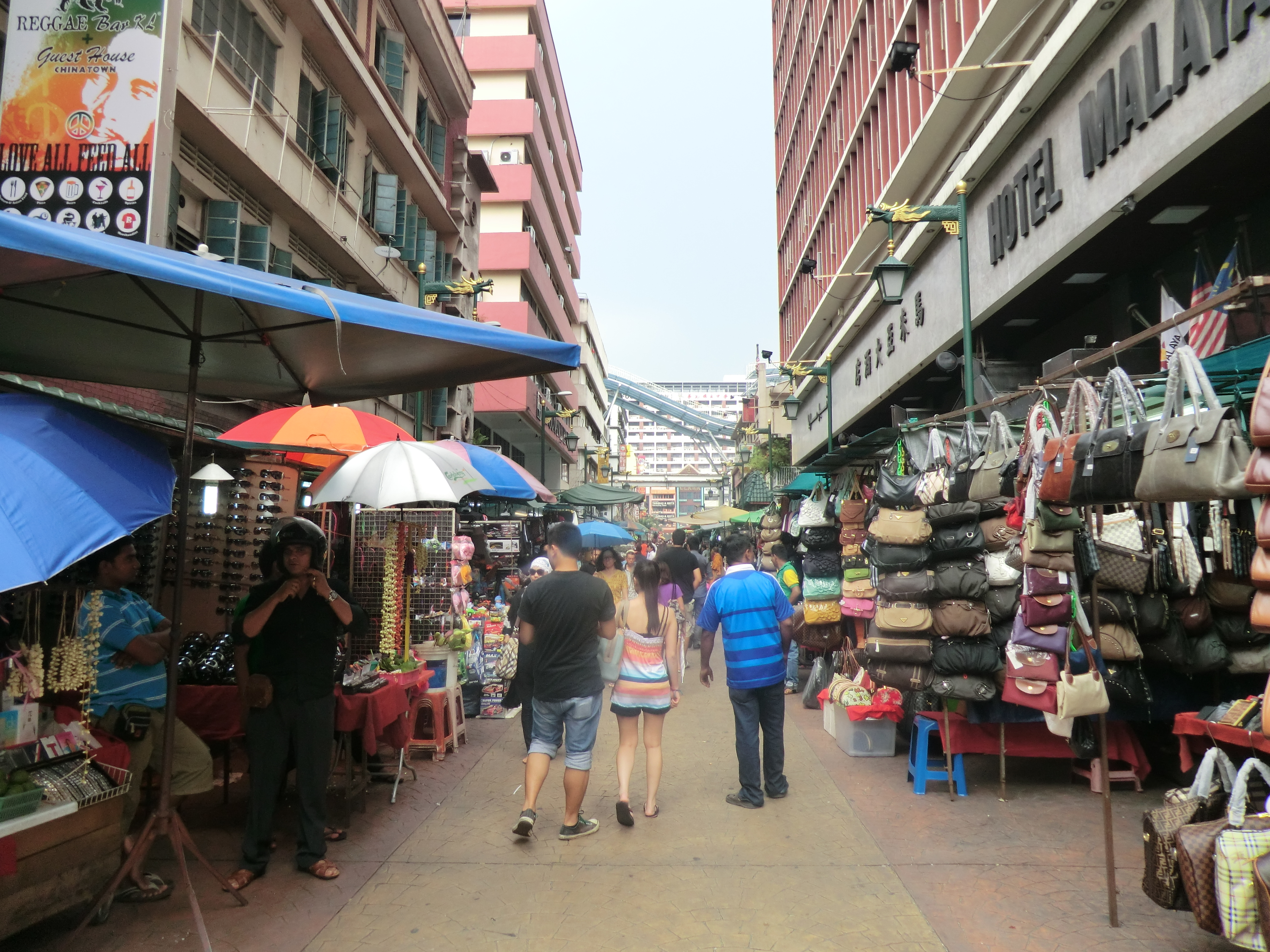
Fashion accessories for sale in Petaling Street, Malaysia.

Fashion tourism is a niche market segment evolved out of three major sectors: Creative Tourism, Cultural Tourism and Shopping Tourism.

International cities are increasingly using the cultural industries for the development of tourism and other industries to boost their economic fortune and to position themselves in the global market. There is often no need for cities to specialize in any new activity but rather to diversify their economy and it is in this context that fashion tourism has been adopted and promoted in cities such as Antwerp, London, and Tokyo. Fashion is a global industry and many capital cities have press-grabbing trade activity at least twice a year, such as London through its London Fashion Week, and this is often the starting point for many cities to take fashion seriously as a new anchor for their tourism industry and visitor economy. They are consciously pushing fashion week trade events into the public eye to raise their city's fashionable credentials and encourage visitors to consider travel to their city.

In 2023, Kogan Page published a critically acclaimed book which covers fashion tourism and shopping travel, "Leading Travel and Tourism Retail", which researched in depth the fashion tourism post-COVID.

At the end of 2023, Emerald Publishing published the first edited book by Professor Maria Gravari-Barbas and Dr. Nadzeya Sabatini, titled "Fashion and Tourism: Parallel Stories", which presents 15 chapters of academic research looking into the intersection and parallel developments of the two industries.

== Prime movers ==
London (via the Mayor of London's office) and New York (via the New York City Economic Development Corporation) government offices have been leading the way internationally to use their fashion credentials to attract visitors to their cities and wider. Other cities also following suit having seen the economic impact which London and New York's fashion credentials can bring. Seoul now has two fashion weeks, and riding on the reputation of these, the city now has a vast complex of shopping malls and wholesale retailers which attract more than two million visitors per year, including just about half of all the tourists who come to Seoul. Singapore also has a fashion week and the Singapore Tourism Board includes fashion as one of the high-profile component for enhancing the city's destination attractiveness.

Even a city as obscure as Lagos, Nigeria, (in terms of fashion credentials) has recently commissioned the Central University of Applied Sciences to prepare a report titled ‘The Emerging Role of Fashion Tourism and The Need for a Development Strategy’ so that they could assess the advantages fashion could bring to their local and regional economy.

== Shopping as a tourism motivator ==
Shopping has become a motive to travel and is now a major tourist activity. Visitors are increasingly choosing shopping as a way to experience local culture through an engagement with local products and local craftspeople, and some destinations provide special tourist shopping activities for tourists to shop for goods. As a niche market segment within shopping tourism, the economic importance of fashion tourism cannot be under-estimated. The recently launched Bicester designer shopping village, an hours train journey out of London is now the third largest shopping destination in the UK after Harrods and Selfridges, and the Bicester train station has signage in Mandarin and Arabic. Individual fashion brands also play a major part in fashion tourism marketing. VisitBritain, the UK's tourism board, recently stated that the luxury clothing brand Burberry has almost played a lone hand in attracting lucrative high-spending Chinese tourists to the UK.

According to the tourism statistical data of the U.S. Office of Travel and Tourism Industries on tourism performance, shopping ranked as the top participation activity for Asians (90%), Western Europeans (86%), and Eastern European tourists (85%). Detailed profiles for countries of origin show that shopping is on the top among all other tourist activities for the European countries of Ireland (93%), Spain (82%), and Italy (79%). Asian shopping participation percentages are particularly high in Taiwan (93%) and Japan (92%).

There are increasing incentives to travel for economic reasons, as purchasing power and currency fluctuations can play an important role in travel decision making, as well as relative price positioning. There is a trend within shopping tourism for consumers from emerging markets, notably China and South America, to plan their trips according to where fashion handbags are cheapest. Up to 50% of sales of luxury goods in Western Europe are generated by foreigners and global travel generates as much as 30% of total sales of luxury goods. The queues of non-Parisians outside Louis Vuitton clearly mean something, but according to an HSBC report ‘The Bling Dynasty’, this is less about status (the chic of buying from the point of origin) than economic intelligence (the savings involved). This isn't limited to luxury products. Brazil has overtaken the UK as the source of the largest group of tourists to Florida and New York, and they spend close to twice as much as British tourists on products, partly because they can make savings of up to 70% on US merchandise compared to its cost in Brazil.. The nature of shopping tourism is certainly changing: “It’s not about souvenirs - it’s about savings”.

In 2023 Kogan Page published a critically acclaimed book which covers fashion tourism and shopping travel, "Leading Travel and Tourism Retail", which researched in depth the fashion tourism post-COVID.

== See also ==
- Fashion capital
