= Frédéric Godart =

French researcher, industry expert and sociologist

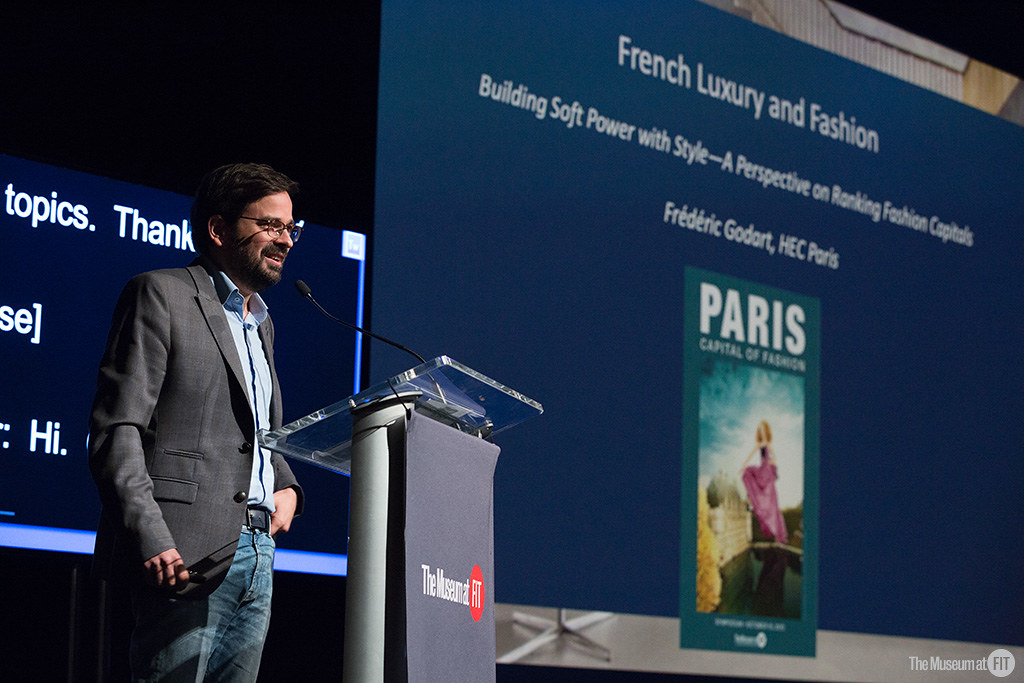
- Godart at the Fashion Institute of Technology

Academic background
- Education: Columbia University

Academic work
- Discipline: Sociology, Organizational Behavior
- Institutions: INSEAD
- Main interests: Creativity, Fashion, Luxury, Social Networks, Artificial Intelligence
- Notable works: Unveiling Fashion: Business, Culture, and Identity in the Most Glamorous Industry
- Website: faculty.insead.edu/frederic-godart/biography-and-vitae/

Frédéric Godart is a French sociologist and full professor of Organizational Behavior at INSEAD in Fontainebleau (France). His research focuses on creative industries, particularly fashion and luxury, with an emphasis on social networks, creativity, and market dynamics. He is co-editor-in-chief of Poetics: Journal of Empirical Research on Culture, the Media and the Arts. His 2012 book, Unveiling Fashion: Business, Culture, and Identity in the Most Glamorous Industry, examines the fashion industry as a social and cultural system.

== Early life and education ==
In autumn 1997, Godart was admitted to the École normale supérieure Paris-Saclay (1997–2002), from which he earned degrees in Economics and Social Sciences. He graduated from Sciences Po Paris with an MSc in management in 2001. Godart was also interested in Social and Political Sciences and attended Trinity College, Cambridge in the United Kingdom, where he obtained MPhil in 2002. In 2009 Godart received his PhD in sociology from Columbia University New York. His PhD committee members were: Harrison White (supervisor), Peter Bearman, Karen Barkey, Joel Podolny, and Jean-Claude Thoenig.

== Career ==
Godart worked for three years with McKinsey & Company in Belgium. From 2011 to 2019 Godart served as assistant professor of Organisational Behaviour at INSEAD, teaching Power & Politics (P&P) and Organisational Behaviour II: Leading Organisations (OB2) in the INSEAD MBA program. Prior to joining INSEAD as a full-time tenure-track assistant professor in 2011, he spent two years at INSEAD as a post-doctoral researcher and a teaching fellow.

In 2011, Godart received the French national accreditation for supervising PhD-level research (Habilitation to Supervise Research or "Habilitation à Diriger des Recherches" (HDR) in French), from Paris Dauphine University.

In 2012, Godart published Unveiling Fashion: Business, Culture, and Identity in the Most Glamorous Industry. In the book, he presents fashion as a social and cultural fact and offers a comprehensive account of the global fashion industry, taking the reader through its economic, social, and political arena.

Godart was a visiting scholar from May 2014 - October 2014 at the University of Southern California's Department of Management and Organization. In September 2018, Godart moved to HEC Paris as an associate professor of Management and Human Resources, where he taught Leading Organizations in the Master in Management (MiM), and Leadership and Strategic Talent Management in the HEC Paris International EMBA. He was the Academic Director of the HEC Luxury Certificate sponsored by Kering. In 2019, he returned to INSEAD as associate professor of Organisational Behaviour with tenure.

Godart's main area of research centers on the impact of formal and informal social networks on creativity, as well as the role played by stylistic choices and brand dynamics in the formation of firms and customers’ identities. He has published his research in journals Organization Science, Organization Studies, the Annual Review of Sociology, the Harvard Business Review and Social Forces, and in several edited books. He wrote a book on the structure and culture of the fashion industry, Sociologie de la mode (A Sociology of Fashion), which has been translated into Portuguese and Spanish. He also wrote a book on the intellectual history of fashion, Penser la Mode (Thinking about Fashion). In his research activity, he also addresses the influence of fashion capitals in the fashion industry and leads the non-profit research IFDAQ Global Fashion & Luxury Cities IPX index.

Godart has been featured in El País, The Financial Times, Forbes, and in Le Monde, and is a frequent speaker at conferences and events.

In November 2018, Godart joined the Intel-backed and Austrian fashion intelligence firm IFDAQ, for which he serves as the Co-CEO and Head of Industry.

== Awards and honors ==
- 2023 "International Fashion Science Award (IFSA)" by ISEM Fashion Business School
- 2017 "Best New Directions Paper Award" by Academy of Management
- 2012 "Best Paper Award" by Academy of Management

== Selected books ==
- Structure and Emergence: Reflections on the Sociology of Harrison C. White (Palgrave Macmillan, 2026, co-authored with Alain Degenne and Michel Grossetti) ISBN 9783032111227
- Leadership Team Alignment: From Conflict to Collaboration (Stanford University Press, 2023, co-authored with Jacques Neatby) ISBN 9781503630826
- Aesthetics and Style in Strategy (Emerald Publishing Limited, 2020, co-edited) ISBN 9781800432376
- Sustainable Luxury: Managing Social and Environmental Performance in Iconic Brands (Article; Greenleaf Co, 2015) ISBN 1783530618
- Unveiling Fashion: Business, Culture, And Identity In The Most Glamorous Industry (INSEAD Business Press, Palgrave Macmillan, 2012) ISBN 9780230358355
- Penser La Mode (IFM, 2011) ISBN 9782914863216

== Selected articles ==
- The Sociology of Creativity: Elements, Structures, and Audiences (Jul 2020)
- Explaining the Popularity of Cultural Elements: Networks, Culture, and the Structural Embeddedness of High Fashion Trends (Jan 2019)
- How and When do Conglomerates Influence the Creativity of their Subsidiaries? (Sep 2018)
- Culture, structure, and the market interface: Exploring the networks of stylistic elements and houses in fashion (May 2018)
