= Sinfonía Soledad =

Live album by Panda
- Released: November 30, 2007
- Recorded: November 2006
- Genre: Pop punk; alternative rock
- Label: Movic; Warner
- Producer: Adrián "Rojo" Treviño

Panda chronology
| Amantes Sunt Amentes (2006) | Sinfonía Soledad (2007) | Poetics (2009) |

Sinfonía Soledad (Spanish for Solitude Symphony) is a live album by Mexican rock band Panda released on November 30, 2007 by Warner Music and Movic Records.

The album is based on a compilation of the best known songs of the band recorded on 25 and 26 November 2006 at the National Auditorium in Mexico City; tracks "Nunca Nadie Nos Podrá Parar (Gracias)" (which is a token of appreciation to their audience) and "No Te Deseo el Mal... Pero Tampoco Te Deseo el Bien" (which was included on the soundtrack of the Mexican film Un Mundo Maravilloso) are included as well.

The first track "Intro" features Marcelo Treviño on keyboards. A small orchestra accompanies the quartet, dubbed by the band in plain concert Sinfonía Soledad. Besides the CD, the album includes a DVD with the live performance of songs. In 2007, Sinfonía Soledad peaked at #3 in Mexico.

== Track listing ==
CD

- 1. Intro
- 2. Cuando No Es Como Debiera Ser
- 3. Atractivo Encontramos En Lo Mas Repugnante
- 4. Estoy Más Solo Que Ayer, Pero Menos Que Mañana
- 5. Ya No Es Suficiente Lamentar/3+1
- 6. Procedimientos Para Llegar A Un Común Acuerdo
- 7. Claro Que No
- 8. Narcisista Por Excelencia
- 9. Cita En El Quirófano
- 10. Los Malaventurados No Lloran
- 11. Muñeca
- 12. Ya No Jalaba
- 13. Promesas/Decepciones
- 14. Tus Palabras Punzocortantes...
- 15. So Violento So Macabro
- 16. Disculpa Los Malos Pensamientos
- 17. **No Te Deseo El Mal... Pero Tampoco El Bien**
- 18. **Nunca Nadie Nos Podrá Parar (Gracias)**

The songs in bold are unpublished songs

DVD

1. Intro
2. "Cuando No Es Como Debiera Ser"
3. "Atractivo Encontramos En Lo Más Repugnante"
4. "Estoy Más Soloh Que Ayer, Pero Menos Que Mañana"
5. "Ya No Es Suficiente Lamentar"/"3+1"
6. "La Estrategia Perdida"
7. "Procedimientos Para Llegar a un Común Acuerdo"
8. "Claro Que No"
9. "Narcisista Por Excelencia"
10. "Cita En El Quirófano"
11. "Los Malaventurados No Lloran"
12. "Tripulación, Armar Toboganes"
13. "Muñeca"
14. "No Tienes Oportunidad Contra Mi Antipática Imaginación"
15. "Ya No Jalaba"
16. "Promesas / Decepciones"
17. "Tus Palabras Punzocortantes..."
18. "¡Ah Pero Como Vendo Cassettes!"
19. "Pathetica"
20. "So Violento, So Macabro"
21. "Disculpa los malos pensamientos"
22. End Credits

In some South American countries, Sinfonía Soledad was edited by the label company removing the songs "Disculpa los malos pensamientos" y "Nunca Nadie Nos Podrá Parar (Gracias)" on both the CD and the DVD, and the album was also changed, no longer coming in a box, but rather in a plastic CD case.

=== New track listing ===
CD

1. Intro
2. "Cuando No Es Como Debiera Ser"
3. "Atractivo Encontramos En Lo Más Repugnante"
4. "Estoy Más Sohloh Que Ayer, Pero Menos Que Mañana"
5. "Procedimientos Para Llegar a un Común Acuerdo"
6. "Claro Que No"
7. "Narcisista Por Excelencia"
8. "Cita En El Quirófano"
9. "Los Malaventurados No Lloran"
10. "Muñeca"
11. "Ya No Jalapeño "
12. "Promesas / Decepciones"
13. "Tus Palabras Punzocortantes..."
14. "So Violento, So Macabro"
15. "No Te Deseo El Mal... Pero Tampoco Te Deseo El Bien"*

DVD

1. Intro
2. "Cuando No Es Como Debiera Ser"
3. "Atractivo Encontramos En Lo Más Repugnante"
4. "Estoy Más Soloh Que Ayer, Pero Menos Que Mañana"
5. "La Estrategia Perdida"
6. "Procedimientos Para Llegar a un Común Acuerdo"
7. "Claro Que No"
8. "Cita En El Quirófano"
9. "Los Malaventurados No Lloran"
10. "Tripulación, Armar Toboganes"
11. "Muñeca"
12. "No Tienes Oportunidad Contra Mi Antipática Imaginación"
13. "Ya No Jalaba"
14. "Promesas / Decepciones"
15. "Tus Palabras Punzocortantes..."
16. "¡Ah Pero Como Vendo Cassettes!"
17. "Pathetica"
18. "So Violento, So Macabro"
19. "Narcisista Por Excelencia"
20. End Credits

== Edited Songs ==
In the CD and DVD there are missing some songs that were interpreted in the concert. Those were:

1. "Quisiera No Pensar"
2. "Mala Suerte"
3. "Buen Día"
4. "No Te Deseo El Mal... Pero Tampoco Te Deseo El Bien"* (Live) (album Rarezas)

It is noteworthy that the last two songs on the CD, "No Te Deseo El Mal.. Pero Tampoco Te Deseo El Bien*" and "Nunca Nadie Nos Podrá Parar (Gracias)*" are not live, also that the menu does not show the song "Tus Palabras Punzocortantes".

(The band has stated that their new album will be more experimental.)

== Certifications ==
| Region | Certification | Certified units/sales |
|---|---|---|
| Mexico (AMPROFON) | Platinum | 100,000^{^} |
^{^} Shipments figures based on certification alone.
