= Structuralist Poetics =

1975 book by Jonathan Culler

Structuralist Poetics: Structuralism, Linguistics and the Study of Literature
- Cover of the first edition
- Author: Jonathan Culler
- Language: English
- Subject: Literary theory
- Publisher: Routledge & Kegan Paul
- Publication date: 1975
- Media type: Print
- Pages: 301
- ISBN: 080149155X

Structuralist Poetics: Structuralism, Linguistics and the Study of Literature is a 1975 book of critical literary theory by the critic Jonathan Culler. First published by Routledge & Kegan Paul, it won the James Russell Lowell Prize from the Modern Language Association of America in 1976 for an outstanding book of criticism. It is hailed as the "most thorough and influential account" in the English-speaking world of the school of structuralism as a critical theory of literature.
