= Fashion capital =

City that influences fashion trends

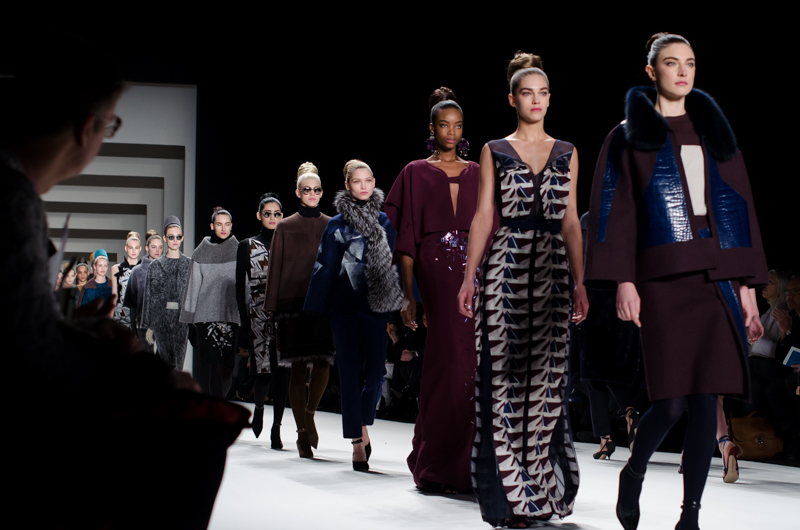
Haute couture fashion models walk the runway during New York Fashion Week.

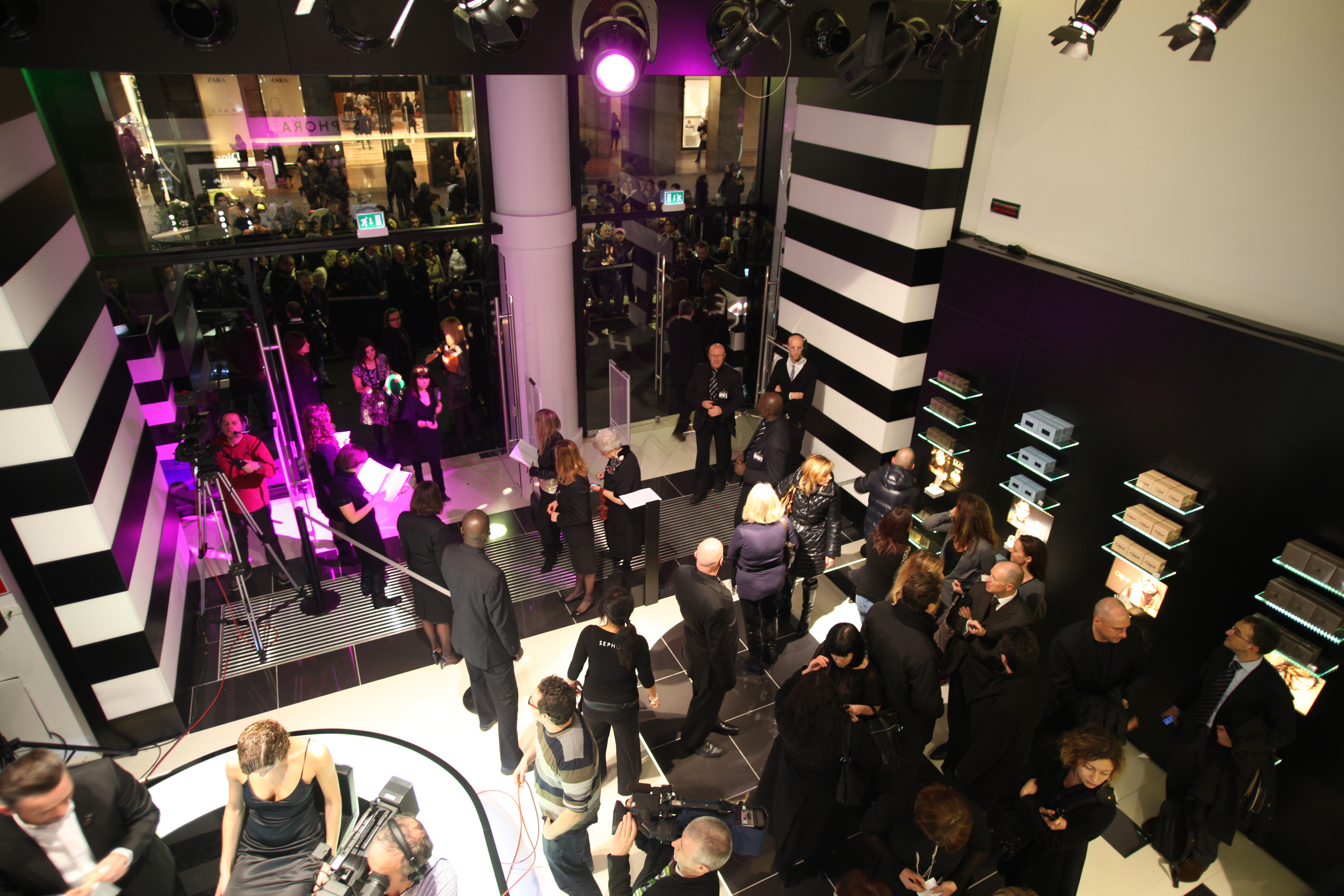
A 2010 Milan Fashion Week event

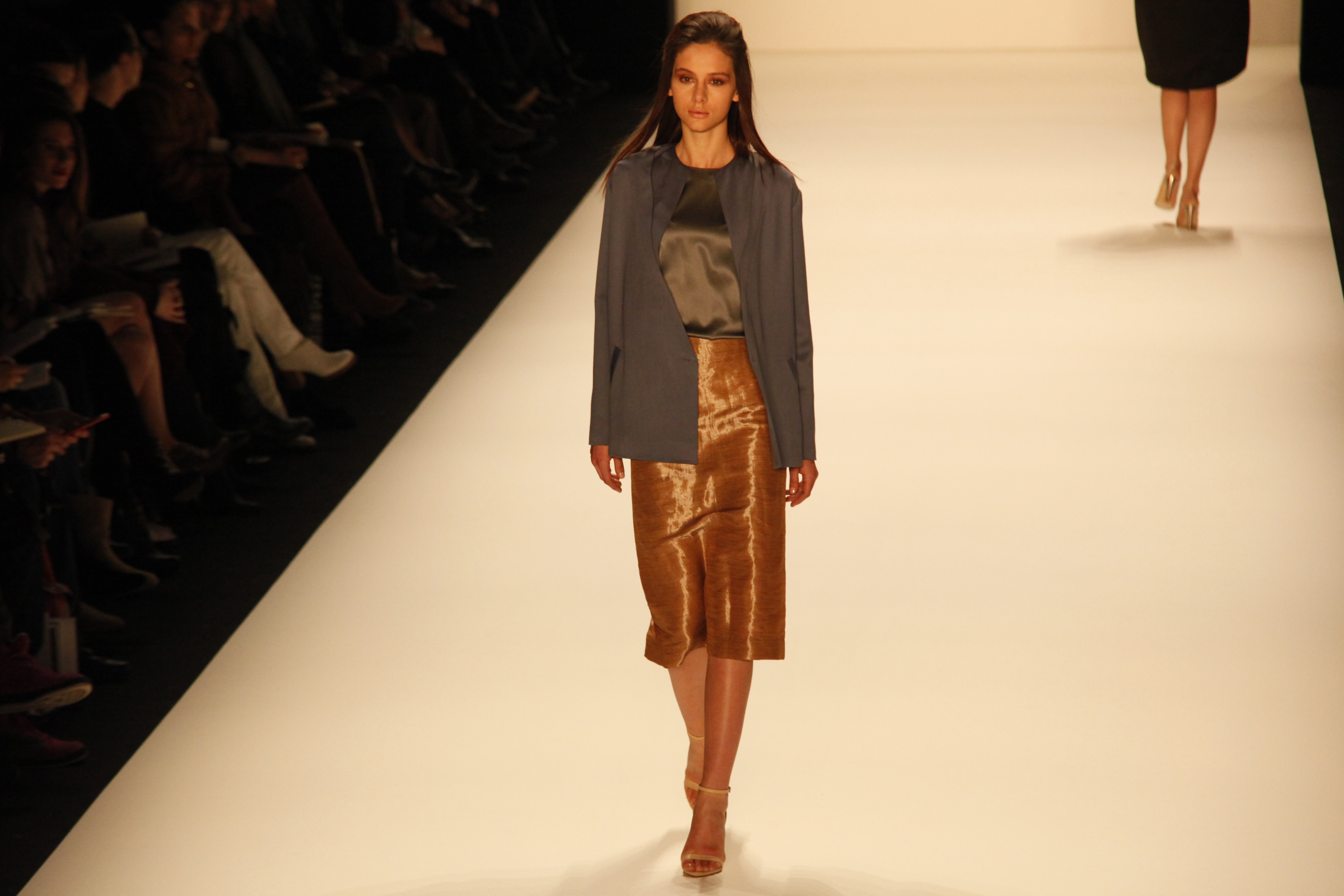
Berlin Fashion Week in 2013. Berlin has returned to being a fashion capital after the German reunification.

A fashion capital is a city with major influence on the international fashion scene, from history, heritage, designers, trends, and styles, to manufacturing innovation and retailing of fashion products, including events such as fashion weeks, fashion council awards, and trade fairs that together, generate significant economic output.

With fashion heritage, structured organization, and celebrated fashion designers of the 20th century, four cities are considered the main fashion capitals of the 21st century. Called the Big Four, the most prominent fashion capitals of the world—in chronological order of their eponymous fashion weeks, are New York City, London, Milan, and Paris.

== Definition of a fashion capital ==
A fashion capital assumes a leadership role in the design of fashion, the creation of styles, and the emergence of fashion trends. In addition, fashion capitals have a broad mix of business, artistic, entertainment, cultural, and leisure activities that are internationally recognized for each having a strongly unique identity. The fashion capital status is also linked to the city's domestic and international profile. Fashion capitals are part of a wider social construct scene, with design schools, fashion magazines, and powerful market of affluent consumers of fashion.

In the 16th century, Milan came to be regarded as the world's fashion capital. Nowadays, while the term fashion capital is still used to describe cities that hold fashion weeks—most prominently, in chronological order, New York, London, Milan, and Paris—, it is the economic development and stylistics created by a fashion capital city that matter to the showbiz and fashion industry. Tokyo, with its fashion week, is also widely viewed as the fifth key city of fashion, and Asia's most important fashion capital. Also, nowadays, the term fashion capital includes other world cities known for hosting notable fashion events and have influential designers in the world of global fashion.

== History ==
Historically, several Italian cities have taken turns being fashion capitals. During the Renaissance era, different city-states in what would become modern-day Italy were Europe's main trendsetters, due to the cultural power they exerted in that period. This included cities such as Florence, Milan, Rome, Naples, Genoa, and Venice.

Progressing into the late 16th century, with the influence of the English royal court, London became a major city in European fashion. Similarly, due to the power of Spain during the period, the Spanish court started to influence fashion, making it a major centre. In the 17th century, as the Renaissance began to fade away, with the power of the French court under Louis XIV, Paris established itself as Europe's main fashion centre.

During the 19th century, with the powerful British Empire and young Queen Victoria on the throne (from 1837), London once again became a major fashion leader. However, it continued to look to Paris for stylistic inspiration, and the British 'father of haute couture' Charles Frederick Worth relocated to Paris in 1846. He did this to perfect and commercialize his craft, holding the first fashion shows and launching the concept of fashion labels there.

=== 20th century and beyond ===
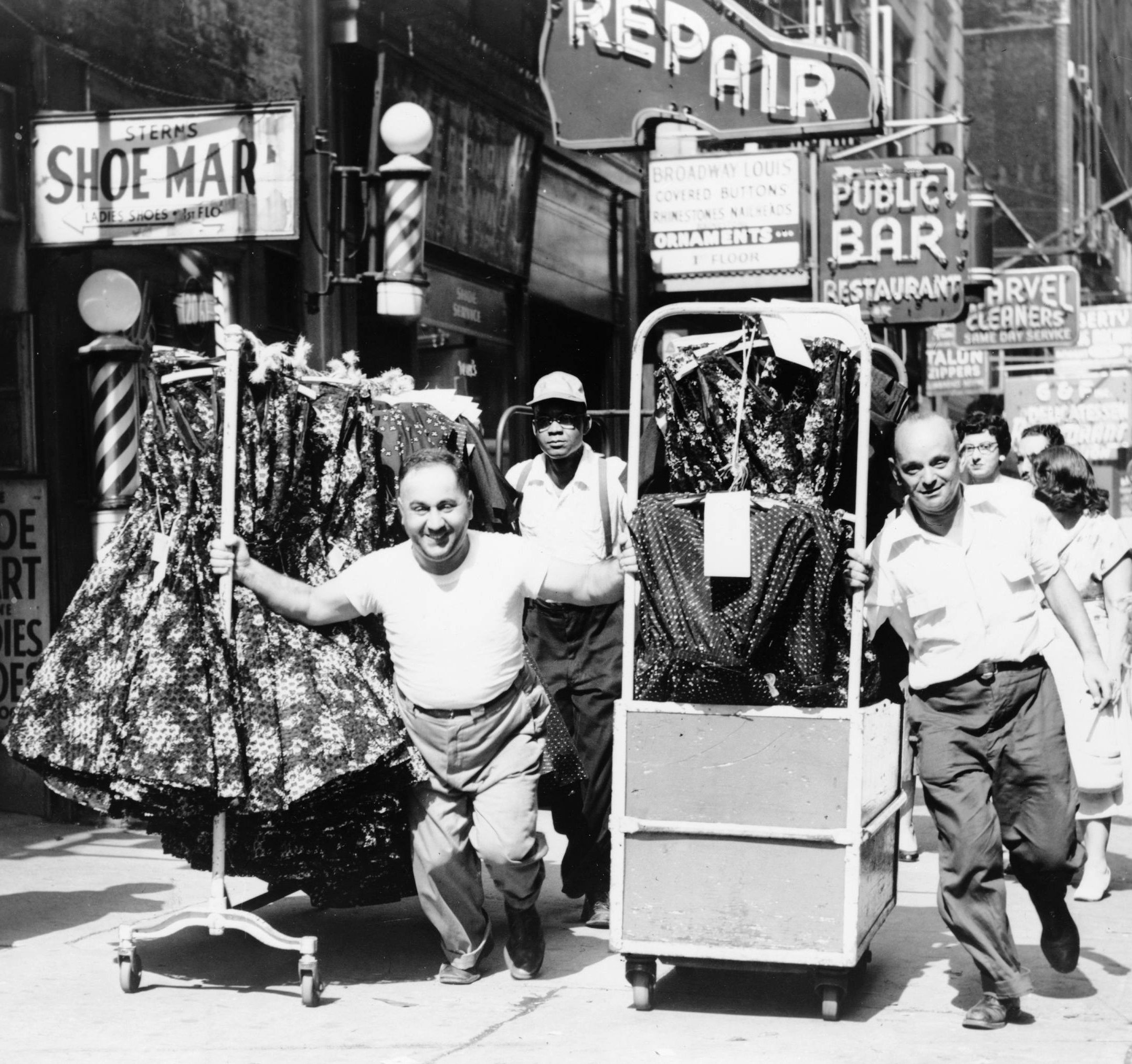
New York's Garment District, 1955

During the Golden Twenties, Berlin was considered the vanguard fashion capital.

Throughout the 20th century – but particularly after World War II – New York City rose in stature as a fashion capital, challenging the dominance of Paris with a different approach, especially in its development and popularization of sportswear as fashion during the 1940s and '50s.

During the 1950s, Italy rose in fashion prominence again. Florence re-emerged as a leading city in fashion, although focus shifted to Milan from the 1970s on as leading design houses moved to the city.

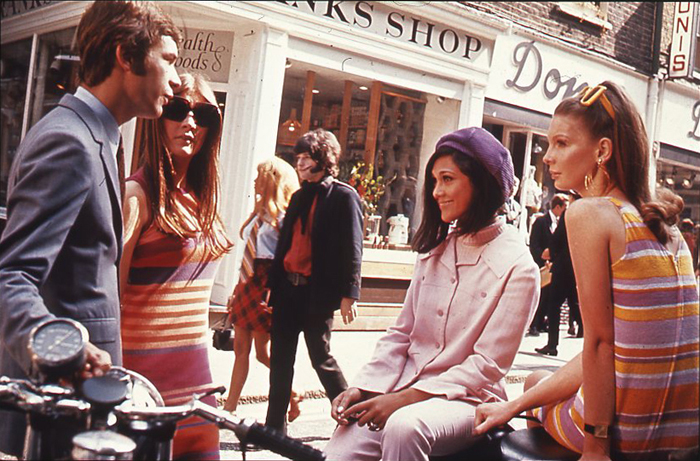
"Swinging London", Carnaby Street, c. 1966

In the 1960s, London became the hub for worldwide youth culture, exemplified by the Swinging London era associated with the King's Road, Chelsea and Carnaby Street, with Mary Quant designing the miniskirt in her King's Road boutique. The role of London as trendsetter was revived in the 1970s, with Vivienne Westwood bringing punk fashion into the mainstream. London was also the focal point for flamboyant fashion in the glam era that preceded it, with designers such as Zandra Rhodes.

In the 1980s, Tokyo claimed its place as a fashion capital with a new generation of avant-garde designers, including Issey Miyake or Rei Kawakubo of Comme des Garçons gaining worldwide attention, even if most of the city's newcomers gained prominence after showcasing their clothing in Paris. The fashion was radically different in its use of textiles and the way designers cut and draped.

Since then, new fashion hubs have emerged worldwide, and the old order has faced challenges from all corners of the globe, including Africa, South America, and Australasia. Since 2007, Berlin has again been highlighted as an increasingly important centre for global fashion trends.

A 2011 issue of Fashion Theory: Journal of Dress, Body and Culture explored the move away from the traditional dominance of five key cities ("Paris, London, Milan, New York and Tokyo"), with co-editor Lise Skov, suggesting what she described as a "poly-centric" fashion industry developing in the 21st century.

In 2019, the Vienna-based fashion intelligence firm IFDAQ under the leadership of fashion sociologist Professor Frédéric Godart measured in a scientific approach the importance, influence, and impact of cities in the fashion industry with neural networks from a large data lake. The resulting IFDAQ Global Fashion and Luxury Cities Index revealed New York as the leading fashion capital, followed by Paris, Milan, and London. A further elaboration of the data in cooperation with the Institution of Engineering and Technology visualized the impact of geopolitical events on the fashion capitals, including Brexit and the US-China trade war.

Writing for Fashion Week Online in 2021, Hannah Longman states: "If you ask which city can rightfully be considered the world capital of fashion, the majority will most likely name Paris, Milan, or London. Yes, these cities have traditionally been considered a Mecca for fans of high fashion, but the world is changing, and there are some new actors in the fashion field." On who could join the big four fashion capitals, Anuj Kumar in Fashion Law Journal in 2026 writes that Tokyo has "the strongest case for a fifth capital, and the one most often left out for reasons that are mostly about geography and time zones", and on cities potentially closing the gap adds, "none of them displaces the top four soon, and pretending otherwise is condescending rather than generous."

== See also ==
- Fashion industry
- Fashion week, for a partial list of cities with fashion weeks.
- Fashion tourism
- British fashion, for more information on the fashion influence of London.
- French fashion, for more information on the fashion influence of Paris
- German fashion, for more information on the fashion influence of Berlin and Germany
- Italian fashion, for more information on the fashion influence of Italy.
- Met Gala
- Time 100
