= Poetry, Georgia =

Poetry Tulip
- Unincorporated community
- Location in Georgia Location in the United States
- Coordinates: 34°17′40″N 85°23′35″W
- Country: United States
- State: Georgia
- County: Chattooga

Poetry is an unincorporated community in Chattooga County, in the U.S. state of Georgia.

== History ==
A variant name is "Tulip". A post office called Tulip was established in 1891, and remained in operation until 1948.

The original name "Tulip" was for the tulip trees near the original town site; the present name of "Poetry" was adopted in 1973 since a share of the population of then artist's colony were poets.
