= Narcisista por excelencia =

"Narcisista Por Excelencia"

Single by Panda

from the album Amantes Sunt Amentes
- Released: 4 September 2006
- Recorded: 2006
- Studio: El Cielo Recording Studio, San Pedro Garza García, Nuevo León
- Genre: Pop punk; Emo-pop
- Length: 3:47
- Label: Movic; Warner
- Songwriter(s): José Madero
- Producer(s): Adrian "Rojo" Treviño

Panda singles chronology
| "Disculpa los malos pensamientos" (2006) | "Narcisista Por Excelencia" (2006) | "Los malaventurados no lloran" (2007) |

Music video
- "Narcisista por excelencia" on YouTube

Narcisista Por Excelencia (English: Quintessential Narcissist) is a song by Mexican rock band Panda. It was released as the lead single for the band's fourth album, Amantes Sunt Amentes in 2006. The song reached the MTV TRL in Latin America, where it peaked at number one.

Like most of the tracks on the album, it portrays love in a ridiculous way that describes a boy who feels insecure about his appearance and how his appearance is perceived by a girl he has a crush on.

== Charts ==
| Chart (2004/2006) | Peak position |
|---|---|
| Romanian top 100 | 73 |
| U.S. Billboard Hot Latin Songs | 6 |
| U.S. Billboard Latin Tropical Airplay | 15 |
| Venezuela Singles Chart | 5 |
