= Poetics (journal) =

- Discipline: Sociology, Literature
- Language: English
- Edited by: Patricia A. Banks, Phillipa Chong, Frédéric Godart, Hannah Wohl

Publication details
- History: 1971-present
- Publisher: Elsevier
- Frequency: Bimonthly
- Impact factor: 1.7 (2024)

Standard abbreviations
- ISO 4: Poetics

Indexing
- ISSN: 0304-422X
- LCCN: 72623832
- OCLC no.: 834054

Links
- Journal homepage; Online archive

Poetics: Journal of Empirical Research on Culture, the Media and the Arts is a bimonthly peer-reviewed academic journal publishing theoretical and empirical research on culture, the media and the arts. It welcomes papers from various disciplines – notably sociology, psychology, media and communication studies, and economics. The editors-in-chief are Patricia A. Banks, Phillipa Chong, Frédéric Godart, and Hannah Wohl. It is published by Elsevier and was established in 1971. According to the Journal Citation Reports, the journal has a 2024 impact factor of 1.7.
