= Global Language Monitor =

American media analytics company

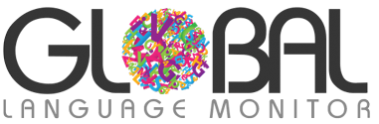
- Type: Media Analytics
- Industry: Analytics, Public Relations
- Founded: 1999
- Founder: Paul JJ Payack
- Headquarters: Austin, Texas, United States

The Global Language Monitor (GLM) is a company based in Austin, Texas, that analyzes trends in the English language.

== History ==
Founded in Silicon Valley in 2003 by Paul J.J. Payack, the GLM describes its role as "a media analytics company that documents, analyzes and tracks cultural trends in language the world over, with a particular emphasis upon International and Global English". In April 2008, GLM moved its headquarters from San Diego to Austin.

In July 2020, GLM announced that the word covid was its Top Word of 2020 for English.

The company has been repeatedly criticized by linguists for promoting misinformation about language. Writing on Language Log, the linguist Ben Zimmer accused it of "hoodwink[ing] unsuspecting journalists on a range of pseudoscientific claims".
