= Los malaventurados no lloran =

"Los Malaventurados No Lloran"

Single by Panda

from the album Amantes Sunt Amentes
- Released: March 2007
- Recorded: 2006
- Studio: El Cielo Recording Studio, San Pedro Garza García, Nuevo León
- Genre: Alternative rock; emo
- Length: 3:28
- Label: Movic; Warner
- Songwriter: José Madero
- Producer: Adrian Rojo Treviño

Panda singles chronology
"Narcisista por excelencia" (2006)	"Los Malaventurados No Lloran" (2007)	"Procedimientos Para Llegar A Un Común Acuerdo" (2007)

Music video
- "Los Malaventurados No Lloran" on YouTube

"Los Malaventurados No Lloran" (English: Unhappy Boys Don't Cry) is a song by the Mexican rock band Panda. It was released in March 2007 as the second single from the band's fourth album, Amantes Sunt Amentes. The song reached the MTV TRL in Latin America, known as Los 10+ Pedidos, where it peaked at number one. The lyrics deal with suicide, depression and the loss of a loved one.

== Charts ==
Chart (2007)	Peak position
Argentinian Top 100	2
Colombian Top 10	8
Mexican Top 100	2
Spain Top 40	9
US Billboard Hot 100	97
