= La Revancha Del Príncipe Charro =

Studio album by Panda
- Released: 11 February 2002
- Recorded: December 2001 – January 2002
- Studio: El Cielo Recording Studio; (San Pedro Garza García, Nuevo León)
- Genre: Pop punk; skate punk
- Length: 46:46
- Label: Movic
- Producer: Adrian "Rojo" Treviño

Panda chronology
Arroz Con Leche (2000)	La Revancha Del Príncipe Charro (2002)	Para Ti Con Desprecio (2005)

Singles from La Revancha Del Príncipe Charro
- 1. "Hola!" Released: 2002; 2. "Maracas" Released: 2003; 3. "Ya No Jalaba" Released: 2003; 4. "Quisiera No Pensar" Released: 2004

La Revancha Del Príncipe Charro is the second studio album by Mexican rock band Panda, released on 11 February 2002 through Movic Records.

The band found moderate mainstream success, and was later certified platinum in Mexico with reportedly over 100,000 sales. Continuing with the lovelace, immature and humorous pop punk sound and lyrical content explored in their debut album, they implemented keyboard and synthesizer effects to their predominant skate punk tone.

== Track listing ==
All lyrics are written by José Madero Vizcaíno, except where noted.

No.	Title	Lyrics	Length
1.	"Christina"		3:38
2.	"Claro Que No"		2:59
3.	"Hola!"		2:48
4.	"El Chango de los Dos Plátanos"		3:26
5.	"Corazón de Un Cuento Roto"		3:45
6.	"Doble Gracias"		2:45
7.	"Quisiera No Pensar"		3:23
8.	"Ya No Jalaba"		2:54
9.	"Córtame con Unas Tijeras Pero No Se Te Olvide el Resistol para Volverme a Pegar"		3:10
10.	"Señor Payaso"		3:15
11.	"Ando Pedo y Ella Está Aquí"		3:35
12.	"Ilasha"	Madero; Constantino Madero	3:09
13.	"Mala Suerte"		2:08
14.	"Amiguito"		2:47
15.	"Maracas" (Joan Sebastian cover)	Joan Sebastian	2:56
Total length:			46:46

== Personnel ==
Adapted from La Revancha Del Príncipe Charro's liner notes.

Panda

- José Madero – vocals, guitar, moog
- Jorge "Ongi" Garza – lead guitar, secondary vocals
- Ricardo Treviño – bass
- Jorge "Kross" Vázquez – drums

Production

- Adrián "Rojo" Treviño – producer, mixer
- Francisco "Kiko" Lobo de la Garza – executive producer
- Heriberto López – recording assistant
- Gerardo García – studio tech
- Blas Escamilla – studio runner
- Nancy Matter – mastering engineer at Moonlight Mastering, in Los Angeles, California
- Mario Videgaray – art direction, design
- Karime García Travesí – photography
- Sergio Moreno – illustration

Session musicians

- Marcelo Treviño – keyboards (track 8), strings arrangement (track 15)
- Fer Salinas – piano (track 5)
- Marcelo Madero – spoken voice (track 9)
- Alfonso Herrera – choirs
