= Poetics (album) =

Studio album by Panda
- Released: 22 September 2009
- Recorded: February – April 2009
- Studio: ElCielo Recording Studio; (San Pedro Garza García, Nuevo León)
- Genre: Alternative rock; pop-punk; experimental rock
- Length: 60:11
- Label: Movic; EMI
- Producer: Panda; Marcelo Treviño; Adrián “Rojo” Treviño (co-producer); Francisco “Kiko” Lobo de la Garza (exec.)

Panda chronology
Sinfonía Soledad (2007)	Poetics (2009)	Bonanza (2012)

Singles from Poetics
- 1. "Sólo A Terceros" Released: 22 July 2009; 2. "Adheridos Separados" Released: 1 December 2009; 3. "Nuestra Aflicción" Released: 13 May 2010

Poetics is the fifth studio album by Mexican rock band Panda, released on 22 September 2009 through Movic Records and EMI Records.

The band produced the album with fellow keyboardist Marcelo Treviño, keeping the change in tone that was ignited in their third and fourth albums Para Ti Con Desprecio and Amantes Sunt Amentes, focusing on alternative elements such as pop rock and post-grunge.

It is a concept album divided in two discs (acts), narrating a story based on the interaction of a man with the devil, as well as a relationship towards emotions and the seven deadly sins. The album went on to sell over 60,000 copies, and since has been certified platinum in Mexico.

== Production ==
After three years of absence and two after the release of their live album Sinfonía Soledad, the band decided to start producing new songs, but in a very different way. According to frontman Jose Madero, each member of the band was in a different part of the world, but they each recorded their own piece of music and sent it each one to another through the internet. Later, in early February, the band reunited on the studio El Cielo, in Monterrey, Nuevo León. Once there, they used not only their usual instruments, but also some that have never been used before. The album was completed between March and April 2009.

== Promotion and tour ==
After completing the album, the band went on a mini-tour in Mexico and played three songs from the album: "Sólo A Terceros", "Abigaíl" and "Amnistía". Later, the band stopped the tour. They had signings throughout Latin America and in the United States as well, reaching cities like Los Angeles, California.

== Release ==
It was expected to be released sometime between April or May, but the band had announced that the album would be released on 17 July. Near the release date, the band postponed the release to 22 August, and then to 22 September, which angered the fans. According to the band, it was not their decision, but their managers' and producers'.

Their first single was "Sólo A Terceros" and was released on radio stations on 22 July, and the official music video was released on 27 July, on the Mexican TV show Los 10+ Pedidos.

== Track listing ==
All lyrics are written by José Madero; all music is composed by Panda.

ACT I

No.	Title	Length
1.	"Popurrí para Ti" (Medley for You)	3:17
2.	"Fascinante" (Fascinating)	4:31
3.	"Conversación Casual" (Casual Conversation)	3:47
4.	"El Cuello Perfecto" (The Perfect Neck)	3:39
5.	"Espíritu Pionero" (Pioneer Spirit)	2:41
6.	"Solo a Terceros" (Only to Third Parties)	4:32
7.	"Abigail"	4:16
8.	"Casi Nula Autoestima" (Almost Null Self-esteem)	3:43
9.	"Del Rapto y Otros Pormenores" (Of the Rapture and Other Details)	2:47
10.	"Nuestra Aflicción" (Our Affliction)	5:06
Total length:		36:19

ACT II

No.	Title	Length
1.	"Que Tu Cama Sea Mi Hogar" (Make Your Bed My Home)	3:16
2.	"Adheridos Separados" (Separate Adherents)	3:20
3.	"Martirio de Otro" (Martyrdom of Another)	3:21
4.	"¡Soy un Ganador!" (I'm a Winner!)	3:05
5.	"Lascivamente" (Lewdly)	3:28
6.	"Un Tipo de Indulgencia" (A Type of Indulgence)	3:51
7.	"Amnistía" (Amnesty)	2:00
8.	"Agradable Locura Temporal" (Pleasant Temporary Madness)	3:39
9.	"Espejismos y Visiones" (Mirages and Visions)	3:15
10.	"Quinta Real" (Real Fifth)	3:58
Total length:		31:53

== Personnel ==
Adapted from album liner notes:

=== Panda ===
- Jose Madero – vocals, guitar, ukulele
- Ricardo Treviño – bass
- Jorge Vazquez – drums
- Arturo Arredondo – lead guitar

=== Production / Session musicians ===
- Panda – production
- Marcelo Treviño – production, piano, keyboards, orchestration, choirs
- Adrián "Rojo" Treviño – co-production, recording and mixing at ElCielo Recording Studios
- Francisco “Kiko” Lobo de la Garza – executive production
- Jaime Cavazos – mastering at OVU Studios
- Gil Elguezabal – recording assistant
- Gino Orona – recording assistant
- Beto Ramos – drum tech
- Oscar Rojas Mustelier – trumpet on "Popurri Para Ti"
- Alfonso Herrera – choirs on "Casi Nula Autoestima"
- Mario Videgaray – art direction, design
- Adrián Pérez Acosta – illustration

== Charts ==
Chart (2009)	Peak position
Mexican Albums Chart	1
US Top Latin Albums	69

== Certifications ==
Region	Certification	Certified units/sales
Mexico (AMPROFON)	Platinum	60,000^{^}
^{^} Shipments figures based on certification alone.
