= Arroz Con Leche (album) =

Studio album by Panda
- Released: September 25, 2000
- Recorded: February – March 2000
- Studios: El Cielo Recording Studio, San Pedro Garza García, N. L.
- Genre: Pop-punk
- Length: 40:03
- Label: Movic
- Producer: Alan Mason

Panda chronology
Arroz Con Leche (2000)	La Revancha Del Príncipe Charro (2002)

Singles from Arroz Con Leche
- 1. "Buen Día" Released: 2000; 2. "Sí Supieras" Released: December 10, 2000; 3. "Miércoles" Released: 2000; 4. "Muñeca" Released: 2000; 5. "Te Invito A Mi Fiesta" Released: 2000

Arroz Con Leche is the debut studio album by Mexican rock band Panda. It was released on September 2, 2000, through independent record label Movic Records. The album was produced by Alan Mason. It was re-issued as a VCD after the moderate success of follow-up, La Revancha Del Príncipe Charro in 2002, due to poor album sales.

== Background ==
The record includes 12 songs, which were chosen from among several songs from their Demo 1997. It was recorded in the Kaura Recording's Studio Garza, under the executive production of Alan Mason and assistance in recording by Adrián "Rojo" Treviño. The producer pushed the band to give their songs a little more pop-leaning influence to their punk sound.

The singles chosen to promote the album were "Buen Día", "Si Supieras", "Muñeca" and "Te Invito A Mi Fiesta".

Unfortunately, it went unnoticed in the record stores and critics alike, but after the success of their second album, La Revancha Del Príncipe Charro, they launched a reissue of their debut album in 2002. This disc contained the original songs from their first album along with new extras in the CD: wallpapers, games, discography, lyrics, music and screensavers.

== Credits ==
Credits adapted from AllMusic.

Panda

- José Madero – lead vocals, guitar
- Jorge "Ongi" Garza – guitar, backing vocals
- Ricardo Treviño – bass, backing vocals
- Jorge "Kross" Vázquez – drums, backing vocals

Additional personnel

- De La Garza – executive producer
- Alan Mason – producer
- Alan Mason – engineer, producer
- CDM (Fusión Global Jr.) – mixing, recording
- Cha – typography
- Jacobo Parra – photography
- Mario Videgaray – art direction, graphic design

== Track listing ==
All tracks written by José Madero

1. El Elías ("Elias")
2. Tanto ("Too Much")
3. Miércoles ("Wednesday")
4. En El Vaticano ("In The Vatican")
5. Sunny Blue
6. "Buen Día" ("Good Day")
7. "Sweater Geek"
8. "Sí Supieras" ("If You Only Knew")
9. "El Gran McGee" ("The Great McGee")
10. "Muñeca" ("Babydoll")
11. "Gripa y Mundial" ("Flu and The World Cup")
12. "Te Invito A Mi Fiesta" ("I Invite You To My Party")
