= Panda (band) =

Mexican band

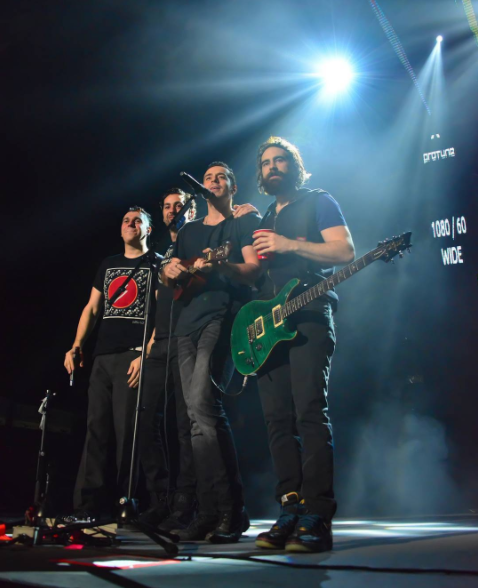

Background information
- Origin: Monterrey, Nuevo León, Mexico
- Genres: Alternative rock; pop-punk; punk rock; emo; skate punk
- Years active: 1996–2016
- Labels: Movic; Warner; EMI; Universal
- Spinoffs: Desierto Drive
- Members: José Madero; Ricardo Treviño; Jorge "Kross" Vázquez; Arturo Arredondo
- Past members: Jorge Garza; David Castillo; David Nuno
- Website: Official Panda Facebook.

Panda (commonly stylized as PXNDX) was a Mexican rock band formed in Monterrey, Nuevo León in 1996 as part of the musical movement known as Avanzada Regia. The last line-up consisted of singer José Madero, drummer Jorge Vásquez, lead guitarist/Backup vocals Arturo Arredondo and bassist Ricardo Treviño.

The band was founded by singer/guitarist José Madero, guitarist Jorge "Ongi" Garza, bass guitarist Ricardo Treviño and drummer David Castillo whom in 1997 Vásquez replaced. The band went on to produce various demo recordings and landed a deal with independent label Movic Records the following year. The band ended up receiving local attention in 2000 with their debut and second studio albums Arroz Con Leche (2000) and La Revancha Del Príncipe Charro (2002). The next year, they were the opening act for American rock band Blink-182 during their brief tour in Mexico. This prompted Madero and co., who at the time were doing odd jobs, to drop out and focus on their music career. By 2004, their major-label debut translated with success in follow-up Para Ti Con Desprecio (2005). It reached gold and platinum status, with album sales of over 200,000. However, the band would become a target of massive backlash over plagiarism reports that had caused poor criticism and damage to their reputation and image for years to come.

Garza departed from the group while recording para ti con desprecio, and Súper Azfalto guitarist Arturo Arredondo would then replace him. Their fourth effort, highly acclaimed Amantes Sunt Amentes (2006) became the band's highest-selling album with over 250,000 albums sold, gained gold and double platinum status as well. They achieved international success with Poetics (2009), Bonanza (2012) and Sangre Fría (2013).

In early 2016, it was announced the members would go their separate ways, considering a brief break from recording and/or touring, and the band has been on a temporal hiatus since. Some sources determined that the group had broken up afterwards, but Treviño has replied saying "I think people get tired of the same thing; a new album is announced with four singles to promote it and then going out on tour and then another album. Also, this break serves us to fans missing us on stage." Madero pursued a solo career, while the three resting members formed a new band by the name of Desierto Drive in 2018.

== Background ==
=== Formation (1996–1999) ===
The band started playing covers but they realized they were good at writing their own material, so they started writing songs about friends, parties and love. Those songs were placed on a demo tape, Demo 1997, and distributed to independent labels. Soon after that, their personal friend and independent producer Mario (MarakaZ) Huerta acting as A&R, caught the attention of an independent label, Movic Records, and signed a record deal (by Kiko Lobo).

== History ==
=== Debut, second studio albums and moderate success (2000–2002) ===
Panda's debut studio album, Arroz con leche was released on September 2, 2000, and drew little attention by people and critics, reportedly selling over 50,000 copies. Their second follow-up, La Revancha Del Príncipe Charro, was released February 3, 2002. It sold well, gaining moderate success and reached platinum in Mexico. The album also contained a cover from Joan Sebastian and Alberto Vazquez (singer)'s duet song, "Maracas".

The band toured in the United States and Mexico to promote their album. At the end of the tour, they went into the studio to record a third effort. Jorge Garza left the band after the group finished the material and was replaced by another member from Super Azfalto, this time guitarist Arturo Arredondo.

=== Para Ti Con Desprecio, plagiarism claims, fan backlash and Amantes Sunt Amentes (2005–2006) ===
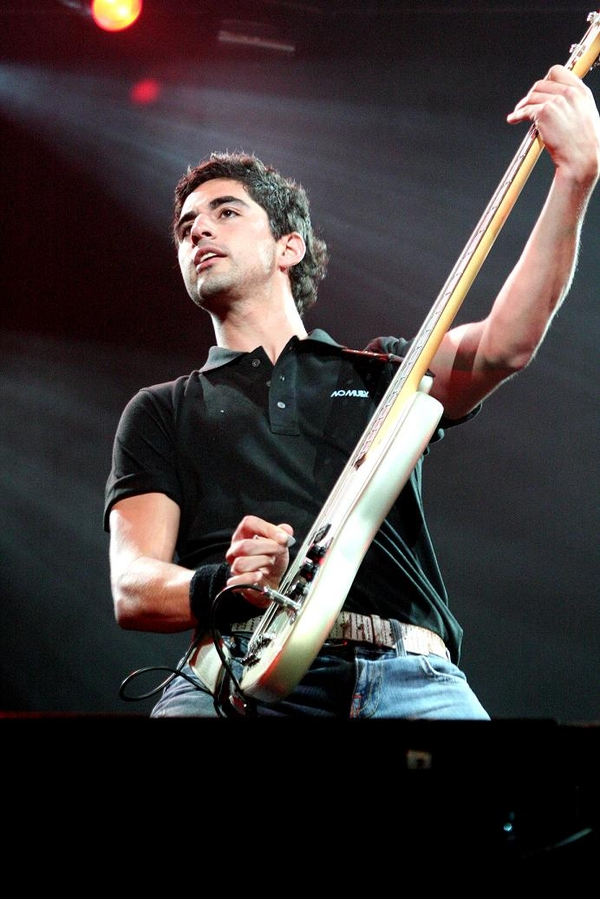
Ricardo Treviño in 2008

Para Ti Con Desprecio was released on May 11, 2005. The record solidified a change in tone, shifting from their previous sanitized, humorous pop punk sound for a more darker, matured aesthetic elements. It is their most popular album to date in Mexico and Latin America, although it made them lose fans, now called Anti-Pandas, over plagiarism accusations that derived in (supposedly) stealing lyrics and guitar riffs from groups such as My Chemical Romance, Fall Out Boy, Green Day, and Smashing Pumpkins. The singles "Cita en el Quirófano", "Cuando no es como debiera ser", and "Disculpa los malos pensamientos" topped MTV's Los 10+ Pedidos for a total of 39 weeks. "Disculpa los malos pensamientos" was also the most voted video on MTV in 2006. That same year, the band collaborated in the soundtrack of "Skimo", a Mexican sitcom from Nickelodeon, with the song "Si esto fuese realidad".

At the end of the year, the band released Amantes Sunt Amentes, their fourth album, which reached the top of the Mexican charts within weeks and was certified platinum. To date, the album has sold approximately 200,000 copies, and was close to Maná first album Falta Amor.

During this time the band released their second single, "Los Malaventurados no Lloran". The music video has received heavy rotation in MTV.

In February 2007, the band collaborated in the album Tributo al más grande, a tribute album for Mexican norteña band Bronco. The band recorded the song "Oro" with a new rock style. The singer José Madero, accompanied Guadalupe Esparza and Luis Cortes in the song "Amigo Bronco" and led to a great upset.

In mid July, the band released a third single: "Procedimientos Para Llegar A Un Común Acuerdo". Because of the extensive success of the band's previous single, the song was sent to radio stations in all of Latin America at the same time. "Procedimientos" quickly debuted in some of the important Latin charts, ultimately reaching the top 10 in many countries.

On November 30, 2007, Panda released "Sinfonía Soledad", their first live album that contains a concert on Auditorio Nacional in Mexico City. It contains their main songs and two new songs dedicated to their fans.

The band was nominated in Los Premios MTV Latinoamérica 2006, winning the categories Best Group or Duet, Best Alternative Artist, and Breakthrough Artist. The band performed "Narcicista Por Excelencia" during the show. In Los Premios MTV Latinoamérica 2007, the band was nominated for three categories, but only won Best Alternative Artist.

== Controversy ==
In 2005, the Mexican magazine R & R published an article stating that several Panda songs, mainly from the album Para Ti Con Desprecio, were similar to songs from other bands of similar genres (some lyrics were virtually translations), such as: My Chemical Romance, Green Day, MxPx, Blink 182, Sum 41, and Fall Out Boy.

After the scandal, reporters have often mentioned this to the band when they are interviewed. In the interview published on February 31, 2006, on Versus, a television show from Telehit, the band members appeared defensive when asked about the plagiarism, and responded in contradictory ways. Kross, drummer for the band stated: "We didn't steal, it was coincidentally, I don't know... It was not done purposely, it was not made with any malicious intent, so I don't know, the subconscious betrays you ...".

With the release of their fourth album Amantes Sunt Amentes and the growth in popularity of the band on MTV in other countries, they preferred to change the subject when asked about plagiarism. Bassist Ricardo Treviño said: "There are people who say: You either love or hate Pxndx. I think that those who love us are the majority, so why would we argue about these things?". The group acknowledged that all the bad publicity was publicity in the end in their song "¡Ah Pero Cómo Vendo Cassettes!", that roughly translates to "oh, but I still sell lots of records".

The accusations of plagiarism caused many people to reject Panda. These groups call themselves Anti Pandas, and have expressed their position through different websites (YouTube, MySpace and Facebook), as well as festivals where Panda plays. The Anti Pandas say that the list of plagiarism of Panda stands at more than 35 songs.

Panda has been booed in different festivals, such as the 2007 edition of Rock'N'Exa, where the public threw bottles, trash, and other things at them while they played.

The same thing happened in 2008 at the Vive Latino, and the Third International Rock Festival in Rio, although they have an outgrowing fan movement in major U.S. cities such as Los Angeles, Chicago and New York, as well as in most of Latin America and throughout the world.

== Members ==
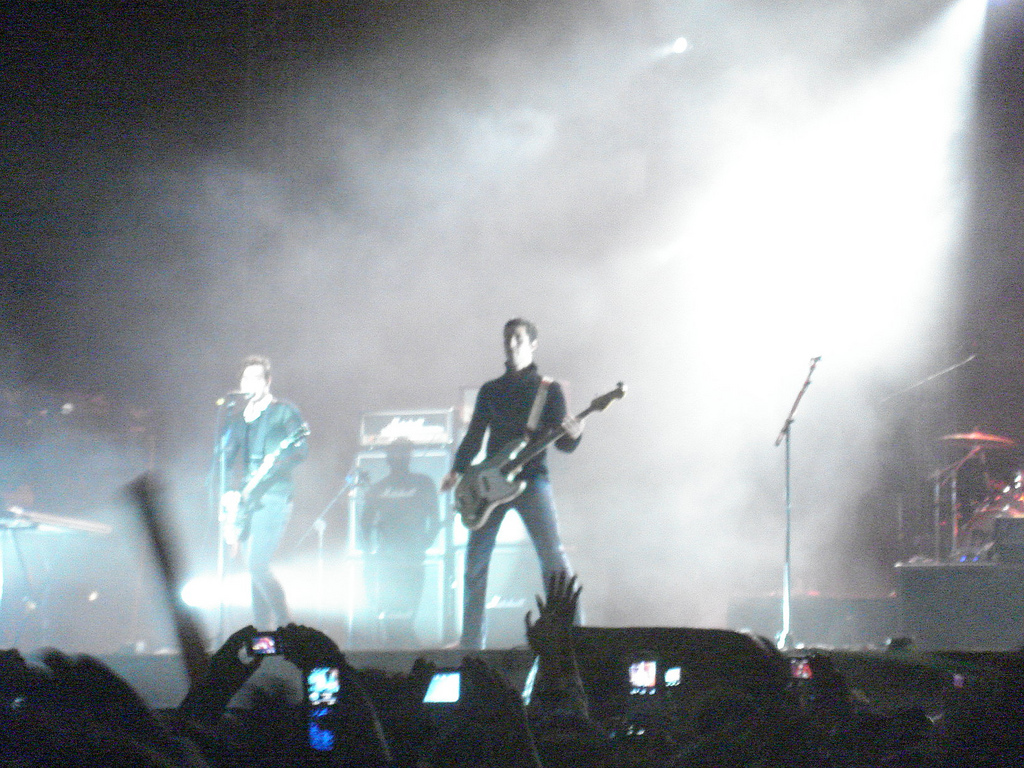
Panda in concert.

=== Closing members ===
- José Madero (Pepe) - lead vocals, rhythm guitar, Moog synthesizer, piano, keyboards (since 1996)
- Arturo Arredondo - lead guitar, vocals (since 2004)
- Ricardo Treviño - bass guitar, backing vocals, occasional unclean vocals (since 1996)
- Jorge Vázquez (Kross) - drums, percussion (since 1997)

=== Former members ===
- David Castillo (Chunky) - drums, percussion (1996)
- Jorge Garza (Ongi) - lead guitar, vocals (1996–2004)
- David Nuno (Deibi) - rhythm guitar, backing vocals (1996-1998)

=== Touring members ===
- Fernando Salinas - rhythm guitar (2005-2010)
- Marcelo Treviño - piano, keyboards, Moog synthesizer, vocals (2005–2012)
- José Hernández - lead guitar (2004)
- Rodrigo "Bucho" Montfort - keyboards, piano, Moog synthesizer, vocal (2012-2013)

== Discography ==
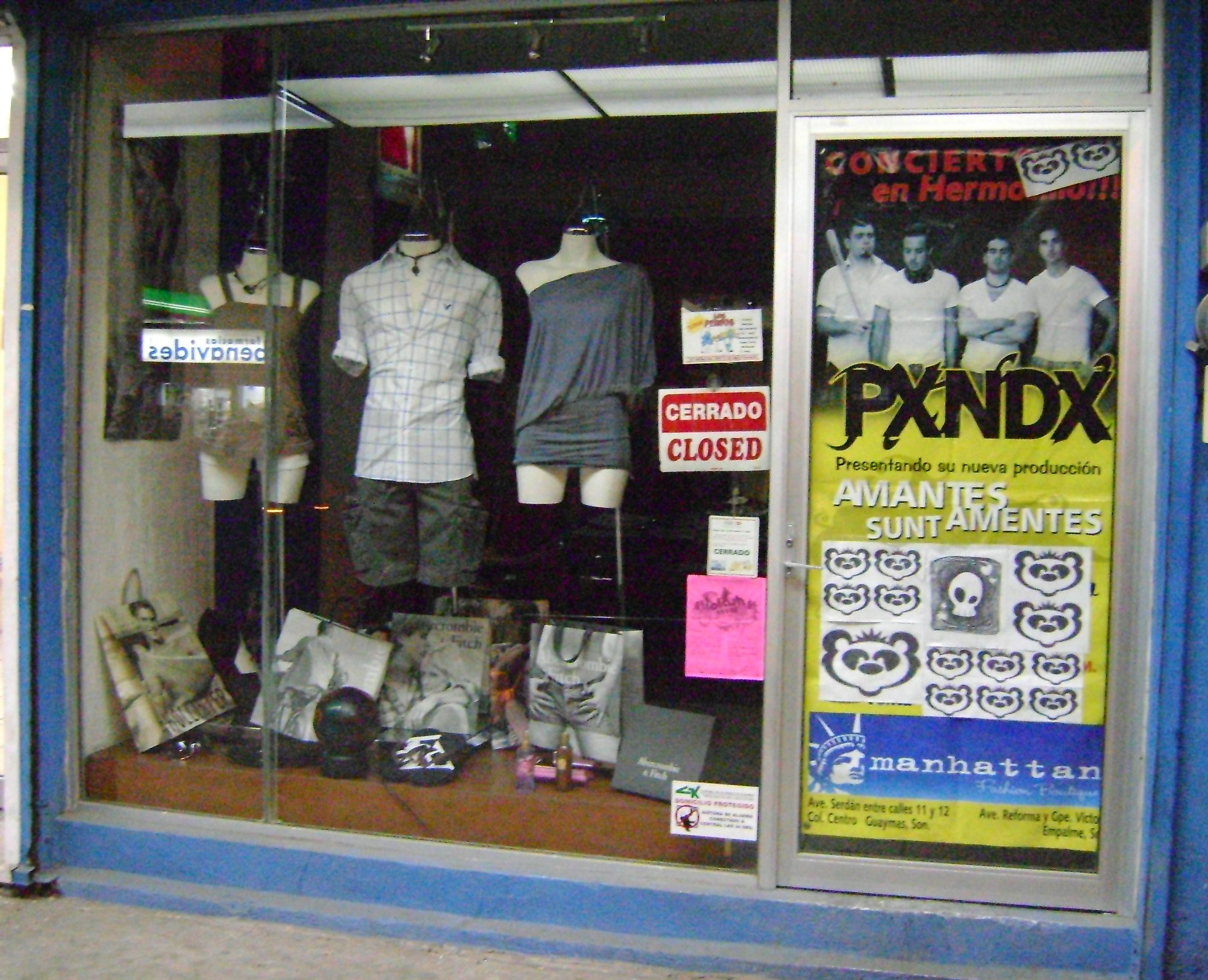
Advertising a Panda concert in Hermosillo, Sonora, in 2008.

- Arroz Con Leche (2000)
- La Revancha Del Príncipe Charro (2002)
- Para ti con desprecio (2005)
- Amantes Sunt Amentes (2006)
- Poetics (2009)
- Bonanza (2012)
- Sangre Fría (2013)
