= Amantes Sunt Amentes =

Studio album by Panda
- Released: 2 October 2006
- Recorded: July 2006
- Studio: ElCielo Recording Studio; (San Pedro Garza García, Nuevo León)
- Genre: Alternative rock; pop-punk; emo
- Length: 40:42
- Label: Movic; Warner
- Producer: Adrián “Rojo” Treviño; Francisco “Kiko” Lobo de la Garza (exec.)

Panda chronology
Para Ti Con Desprecio (2005)	Amantes Sunt Amentes (2006)	Sinfonía Soledad (2007)

Singles from Amantes Sunt Amentes
- 1. "Narcisista por Exelencia" Released: 4 September 2006; 2. "Los Malaventurados No Lloran" Released: 12 February 2007; 3. "Procedimientos Para Llegar a un Común Acuerdo" Released: 30 July 2007

Amantes Sunt Amentes (Latin for Lovers Are Lunatics) is the fourth studio album by Mexican rock band Panda, released on 2 October 2006, through WEA Latina and Movic Records. To promote the album, three singles were released. The first, "Narcicista Por Excelencia", including its music video, were premiered on Los 10+ Pedidos on MTV.

It was notably nominated for the Grammy Award for Best Latin Rock/Alternative Album in 2008. It is the highest-selling album in their catalog to date, and was later certified gold and double platinum by AMPROFON for shipments of over 250,000 copies in Mexico. It also peaked at number one on the Mexican Albums Chart.

== Track listing ==
All lyrics are written by José Madero; all music is composed by Panda.

No.	Title	Length
1.	"La Estrategia Perdida"	3:20
2.	"So Violento So Macabro"	3:21
3.	"El Infame Estar y No Estar"	3:43
4.	"Estoy Más Sohloh Que Ayer, Pero Menos Que Mañana"	3:01
5.	"Narcisista Por Excelencia"	3:47
6.	"Procedimientos para Llegar a un Común Acuerdo"	3:14
7.	"Tripulación, Armar Toboganes"	3:55
8.	"Pathetica"	4:22
9.	"Los Malaventurados No Lloran"	3:27
10.	"Tus Palabras Punzocortantes"	3:15
11.	"Atractivo Encontramos en Lo Más Repugnante"	3:27
12.	"¡Ah Pero Cómo Vendo Cassettes!"	1:44
Total length:		40:42

== Personnel ==
Adapted from album liner notes:

Panda

- José Madero – vocals, guitar
- Ricardo Treviño – bass, guttural vocals
- Jorge Vázquez – drums
- Arturo Arredondo – lead guitar

Production

- Adrián "Rojo" Treviño – producer, mixer
- Francisco “Kiko” Lobo de la Garza – executive producer
- Jaime Cavazos – mastering engineer at OVU Studios
- Rodrigo Mendoza – recording assistant
- Gerardo "El Oso" García – studio tech
- Beto Ramos – drum tech
- Mario Videgaray – art direction, design
- Beto Garza – illustration

Additional musicians

- Marcelo Treviño – keyboards
- Alfonso Herrera – choirs

== Charts ==
=== Weekly charts ===
Chart (2006)	Peak position
Mexican Albums (AMPROFON)	1

=== Year-end charts ===
Chart (2006)	Position
Top 100 Album (AMPROFON)	26

Chart (2007)	Position
Top 100 Album (AMPROFON)	25

== Certifications ==
Region	Certification	Certified units/sales
Mexico (AMPROFON)	Platinum+Gold	150,000^{^}
^{^} Shipments figures based on certification alone.

== Accolades ==
The album was nominated for the Grammy Award for Best Latin Rock, Urban or Alternative Album in 2008, but lost to Black Guayaba's No Hay Espacio.
