= Para ti con desprecio =

Para Ti Con Desprecio

Studio album by Panda
- Released: 11 May 2005
- Recorded: October – November 2004
- Studio: ElCielo Recording Studio; (San Pedro Garza García, Nuevo León)
- Genre: Pop-punk; emo; post-hardcore
- Length: 48:18
- Label: Movic; Warner
- Producer: Adrián "Rojo" Treviño; Panda; Francisco “Kiko” Lobo de la Garza (exec.)

Panda chronology
La Revancha Del Príncipe Charro (2002)	Para Ti Con Desprecio (2005)	Amantes Sunt Amentes (2006)

Singles from Para Ti Con Desprecio
- 1. "Cita en el Quirófano" Released: June 2005; 2. "Cuando No Es Como Debiera Ser" Released: 10 October 2005; 3. "Disculpa Los Malos Pensamientos" Released: 4 March 2006

Para Ti Con Desprecio (Spanish: For You, With Disregard) is the third studio album by Mexican rock band Panda, released on 11 May 2005 through Movic and Warner Records, as the band's major-label debut.

Produced by Adrian Treviño, the album marked a major departure from the band's established humorous style.

Following its release, the band came under fire from the media and general public due to plagiarism accusations, claiming some of the old and new songs contained lyrics, bass riffs and guitar parts that belonged to songs from other mainstream rock acts such as MxPx, Smashing Pumpkins, Green Day, Alkaline Trio, Fall Out Boy and many others, since their debut album. The track "Miedo A Las Alturas" also generated discussion, with its verse and chorus being a literal translation and paraphrasing of the song "It's Not A Fashion Statement, It's A Fucking Deathwish" by American rock band My Chemical Romance.

Despite the controversies, the album was released to critical acclaim by Latin American music critics and newcomer fans, reaching top 5 and top 10 in Mexican music charts. It was a moderate commercial success and catapulted the band into mainstream success, especially in the United States and European countries, where the band had been previously unable to reach. The album's logo that was used in the album artwork also became a precursor to the band's iconic "PXNDX" logo that would be used in every single one of their follow-up albums.

== Composition and lyrics ==
Madero said, "During the early days crafting the album we were writing songs just for the sake to write them. We had something like 'No Me Culpes Por Ser Tan Bello' [literally "Don't Blame Me for Being So Handsome"], so stupid; and after opening concerts for Blink-182 in Mexico, something went really wrong with the girl who was my fiancée. I wanted retribution, but I wasn't planning on throwing eggs to her house or kidnapping her brother. That's when I said 'I'll make a record to let everyone know what a shit of a person you are', and it seemed like a great idea to me".

Madero and bandmates had already written material for their next effort but rejected everything and re-wrote it all over again.

== Track listing ==
All lyrics are written by José Madero Vizcaíno; all music is composed by Panda.

Original release
No.	Title	Length
1.	"Reflexiones De Una Mente Perturbada" (Instrumental)	1:22
2.	"Disculpa los Malos Pensamientos"	3:58
3.	"…Y de la Gasolina Renació el Amor"	3:06
4.	"Cita en el Quirófano"	4:02
5.	"Ya No Es Suficiente Lamentar" (Interlude)	1:22
6.	"3+1"	4:02
7.	"Mi Huracán Llevaba Tu Nombre"	4:12
8.	"Promesas / Decepciones"	5:03
9.	"Descanso : Ódiame" (Interlude)	1:28
10.	"Cuando No Es Como Debiera Ser"	3:58
11.	"Miedo a las Alturas"	3:17
12.	"Hasta el Final"	4:05
13.	"Figura Decorativa Sobre Fondo Ornamental" (Instrumental)	1:15
14.	"No Tienes Oportunidad Contra Mi Antipática Imaginación"	2:59
15.	"Porque Todavía Podemos Decir 'Una Vez Más'"	4:07
Total length:		48:18

== Personnel ==
Adapted from Para Ti Con Desprecio's liner notes.

Panda

- José Madero – vocals, guitar
- Ricardo Treviño – bass, choirs, guttural vocals
- Jorge Vázquez – drums
- Arturo Arredondo – guitar, choirs

Production

- Adrián "Rojo" Treviño – producer, mixer
- Francisco “Kiko” Lobo de la Garza – executive producer
- Ruly Videgaray – recording assistant
- Lalo Nuñez – recording assistant
- Garvin Lurssen – mastering engineer
- Gerardo García – studio tech
- Beto Ramos – drum tech
- Mario Videgaray – art direction, design

Session musicians

- Marcelo Treviño – keyboards (track 8), strings arrangement (track 15)
- Fernando Salinas – piano (track 5)
- Marcelo Madero – spoken voice (track 9)
- Alfonso Herrera – choirs

== Charts ==
=== Weekly charts ===
Chart (2005)	Peak position
Mexican Albums (AMPROFON)	3

=== Year-end charts ===
Chart (2005)	Position
Top 100 Album (AMPROFON)	40

Chart (2006)	Position
Top 100 Album (AMPROFON)	11

== Certifications ==
Region	Certification	Certified units/sales
Mexico (AMPROFON)	Platinum	100,000^{^}
^{^} Shipments figures based on certification alone.
