= Lo Nuestro Award for Rock/Alternative Album of the Year =

Latin music award

Lo Nuestro Awards for Rock/Alternative Album of the Year
- Awarded for: Rock/Alternative Album of the Year
- Country: United States
- Presented by: Univision
- First award: 2001
- Final award: 2013

Highlights
- Most awards: Maná (5)
- Website: univision.com/premiolonuestro

The Lo Nuestro Award for Rock/Alternative Album of the Year was an honor presented annually by American network Univision. The Lo Nuestro Awards have been held annually since 1989. The accolade was established to recognize the most talented performers of Latin music. The nominees and winners were originally selected by a voting poll conducted among program directors of Spanish-language radio stations in the United States and also based on chart performance on Billboard Latin music charts, with the results being tabulated and certified by the accounting firm Arthur Andersen. At the present time, the winners are selected by the audience through an online survey. The trophy is shaped in the form of a treble clef. The categories awarded were for the Pop, Tropical/Salsa, Regional Mexican and Music Video fields before the 2000 awards, and from the following year onwards categories were expanded and included a Rock field for Album and Performer of the Year.

The award was first presented to MTV Unplugged by Colombian singer Shakira. Mexican band Maná were the most nominated and biggest winners in the category, with five wins out of six nominations. Chilean band La Ley won the award twice. Colombian performer Juanes won in 2009 for La Vida... Es Un Ratico, which also received the Latin Grammy Award for Album of the Year and the Grammy Award for Best Latin Pop Album. Mexican ensemble Zoé was the most nominated act without a win, with four unsuccessful nominations. In 2013, all the categories in the Rock Field (Artist, Album and Song of the Year) were merged into the Pop Field.

== Winners and nominees ==
Listed below are the winners of the award for each year, as well as the other nominees for the majority of the years awarded.

Key	Meaning
‡	Indicates the winning album

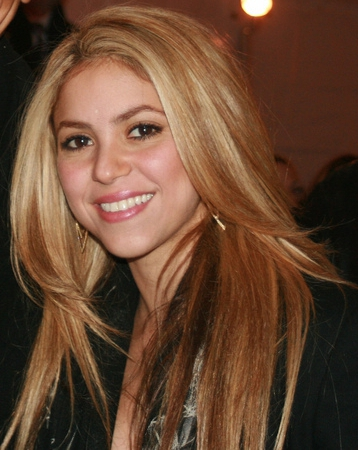
Colombian performer Shakira (pictured in 2009), winner in 2001.

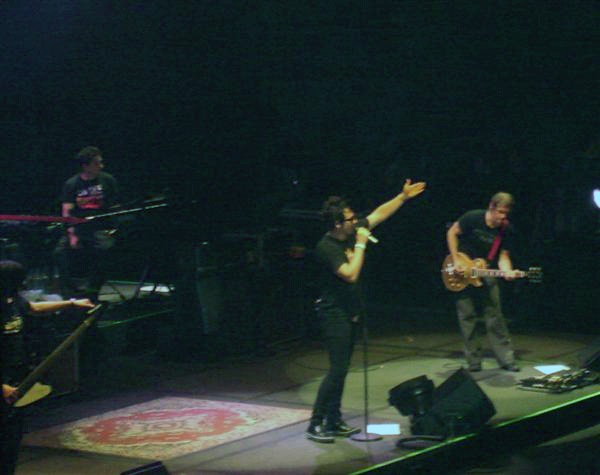
Chilean band La Ley (pictured in 2005), winners in 2002 and 2004.

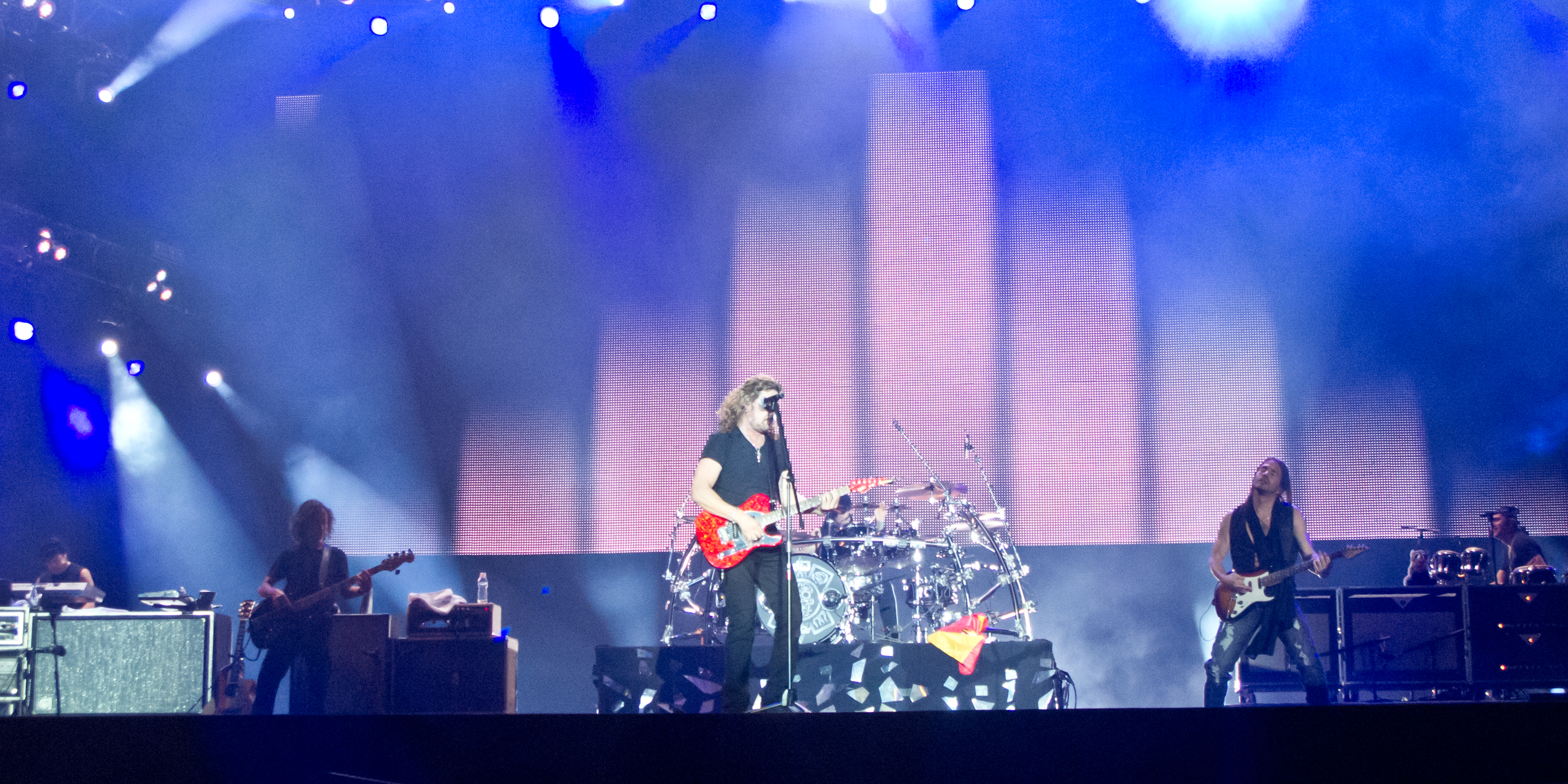
Mexican band Maná (pictured in 2012), the biggest winners in the category, with five wins.

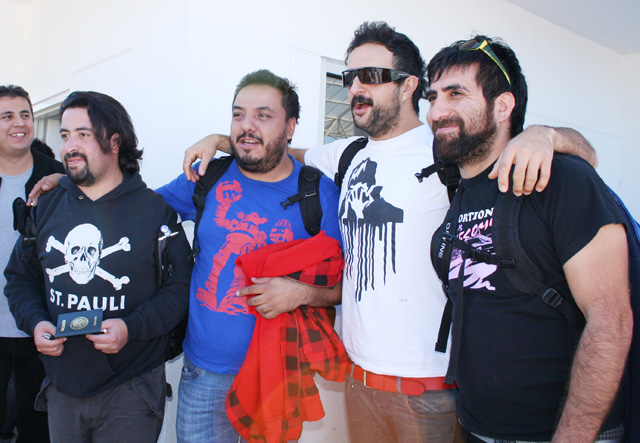
Mexican band Molotov (pictured in 2006), winners in 2006.

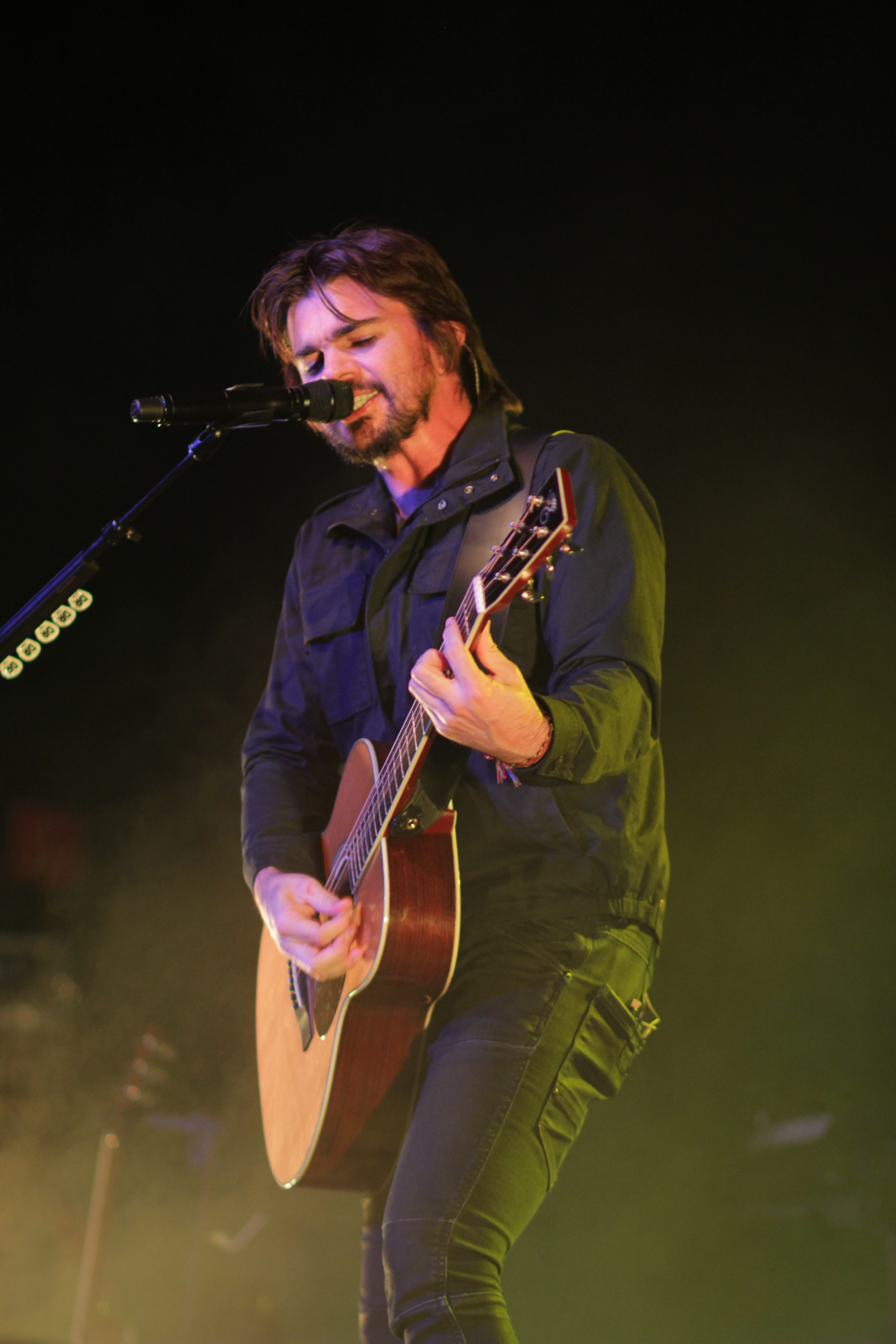
Colombian performer Juanes (pictured in 2012), winner in 2009.

Year	Album	Performer(s)	Ref
2001 (13th)	MTV Unplugged‡	Shakira	
2001 (13th)	La Extraordinaria Paradoja del Sonido Quijano	Café Quijano	
2001 (13th)	89–99	Aleks Syntek	
2001 (13th)	No Podemos Volar	El Tri	
2001 (13th)	Uno	La Ley	
2002 (14th)	MTV Unplugged‡	La Ley	
2002 (14th)	Chuntaros Radio Poder	El Gran Silencio	
2002 (14th)	Cuando la Sangre Galopa	Jaguares	
2002 (14th)	Gozo Poderoso	Aterciopelados	
2002 (14th)	Le Modulor	Mœnia	
2003 (15th)	Revolución de Amor‡	Maná	
2003 (15th)	Buenos Muchachos	La Mosca Tsé Tsé	
2003 (15th)	Cabas	Cabas	
2003 (15th)	Money Pa' Qué	Los Rabanes	
2003 (15th)	Un Día Normal	Juanes	
2004 (16th)	Libertad‡	La Ley	
2004 (16th)	Alma en Fuego	Inspector	
2004 (16th)	Dance and Dense Denso	Molotov	
2004 (16th)	El Primer Instinto	Jaguares	
2004 (16th)	Super Riddim Internacional, Vol. 1	El Gran Silencio	
2005 (17th)	Esenciales: Luna‡	Maná	
2005 (17th)	Atlas	Kinky	
2005 (17th)	Rocanlover	Zoé	
2005 (17th)	Sí	Julieta Venegas	
2005 (17th)	Trippin Tropicana	Superlitio	
2006 (18th)	Con Todo Respeto‡	Molotov	
2006 (18th)	Andrea Echeverri	Andrea Echeverri	
2006 (18th)	Consejo	La Secta AllStar	
2006 (18th)	Consuelo en Domingo	Enjambre	
2006 (18th)	El Cielo de Tu Boca	Circo	
2007 (19th)	Amar es Combatir‡	Maná	
2007 (19th)	Anoche	Babasónicos	
2007 (19th)	Indeleble	Alejandra Guzmán	
2007 (19th)	Pescado Original	Enanitos Verdes	
2007 (19th)	Vida de Perros	Los Bunkers	
2008 (20th)	Oye‡	Aterciopelados	
2008 (20th)	Amantes Sunt Amentes	Panda	
2008 (20th)	Grrr!	Moderatto	
2008 (20th)	Masa con Masa	Millo Torres and El Tercer Planeta	
2008 (20th)	Memo Rex Commander y el Corazón Atómico de la Vía Láctea	Zoé	
2009 (21st)	La Vida... Es Un Ratico‡	Juanes	
2009 (21st)	17	Motel	
2009 (21st)	Arde El Cielo	Maná	
2009 (21st)	Mucho	Babasónicos	
2009 (21st)	Sino	Café Tacuba	
2010 (22nd)	Fuego‡	La Secta AllStar	
2010 (22nd)	La Luz del Ritmo	Los Fabulosos Cadillacs	
2010 (22nd)	Queremos Rock	Moderatto	
2010 (22nd)	Reptilectric	Zoé	
2011 (23rd)	Amor Vincit Omnia‡	Draco	
2011 (23rd)	Evidencia	Vivanativa	
2011 (23rd)	Las Consecuencias	Bunbury	
2011 (23rd)	Radio Lacolifata presenta: El Canto del Loco	El Canto del Loco	
2012 (24th)	Drama y Luz‡	Maná	
2012 (24th)	20 Años de Éxitos En Vivo con Moderatto	Alejandra Guzmán and Moderatto	
2012 (24th)	El Juidero	Rita Indiana and Los Misterios	
2012 (24th)	MTV Unplugged/Música de Fondo	Zoé	
2012 (24th)	P.A.R.C.E.	Juanes	
2013 (25th)	Exiliados en la Bahía: Lo Mejor de Maná‡	Maná	
2013 (25th)	MTV Unplugged	Juanes	
2013 (25th)	La Conexión	Black Guayaba	
2013 (25th)	Transformación	Beto Cuevas	

== See also ==
- Grammy Award for Best Latin Pop, Rock or Urban Album
- Grammy Award for Best Latin Rock, Urban or Alternative Album
- Latin Grammy Award for Best Alternative Music Album
- Latin Grammy Award for Best Rock Album
