= Latin Grammy Award for Best Alternative Music Album =

US music award

- Awarded for: alternative albums containing at least 51% of newly recorded material
- Country: United States
- Presented by: The Latin Recording Academy
- First award: 2004
- Currently held by: Rosalía for Lux (Complete Works) (2026)
- Website: latingrammy.com

The Latin Grammy Award for Best Alternative Music Album is an honor presented annually by the Latin Academy of Recording Arts & Sciences at the Latin Grammy Awards, a ceremony that recognizes excellence and promotes a wider awareness of cultural diversity and contributions of Latin recording artists in the United States and internationally. According to the category description guide for the 2012 Latin Grammy Awards, the award is for vocal or instrumental alternative albums containing at least 51 percent newly recorded material. It is awarded to solo artists, duos or groups.

Mexican artists have received this award more than any other nationality, though it has also been presented to artists originating from Colombia, the United States, and Venezuela. The award was first given to Mexican group Café Tacuba for the album Cuatro Caminos at the 5th Latin Grammy Awards ceremony held in 2004. The category is shared as the most wins with Café Tacuba, Natalia Lafourcade, Julieta Venegas, Aterciopelados and Rosalía with two wins each. The Mexican band Kinky with four nominations is the band with most nominations without a win.

== Winners and nominees ==
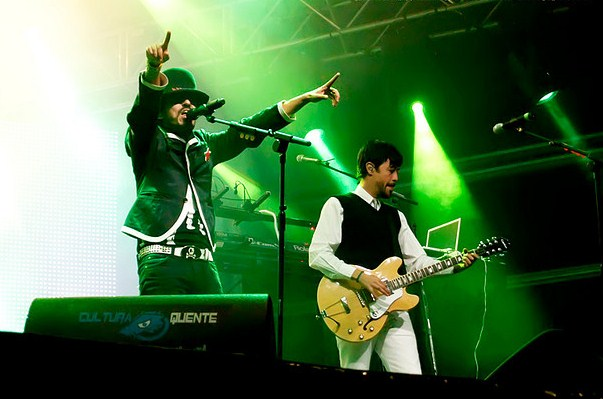
Café Tacuba, the first winners in this category.

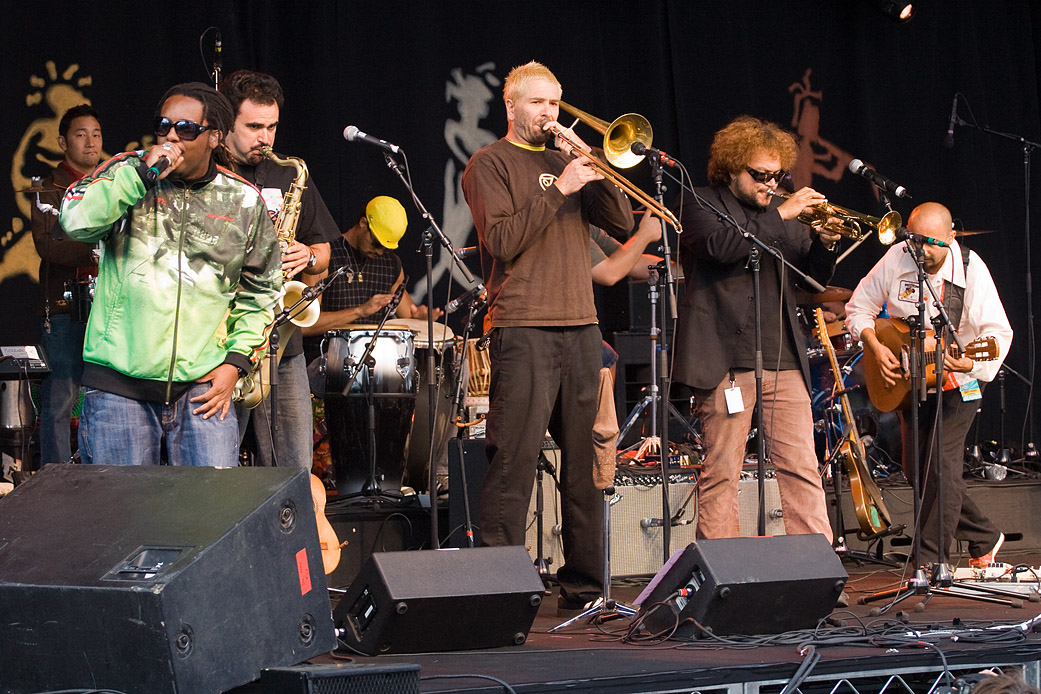
Ozomatli, the first and so far only American ensemble to win this category.

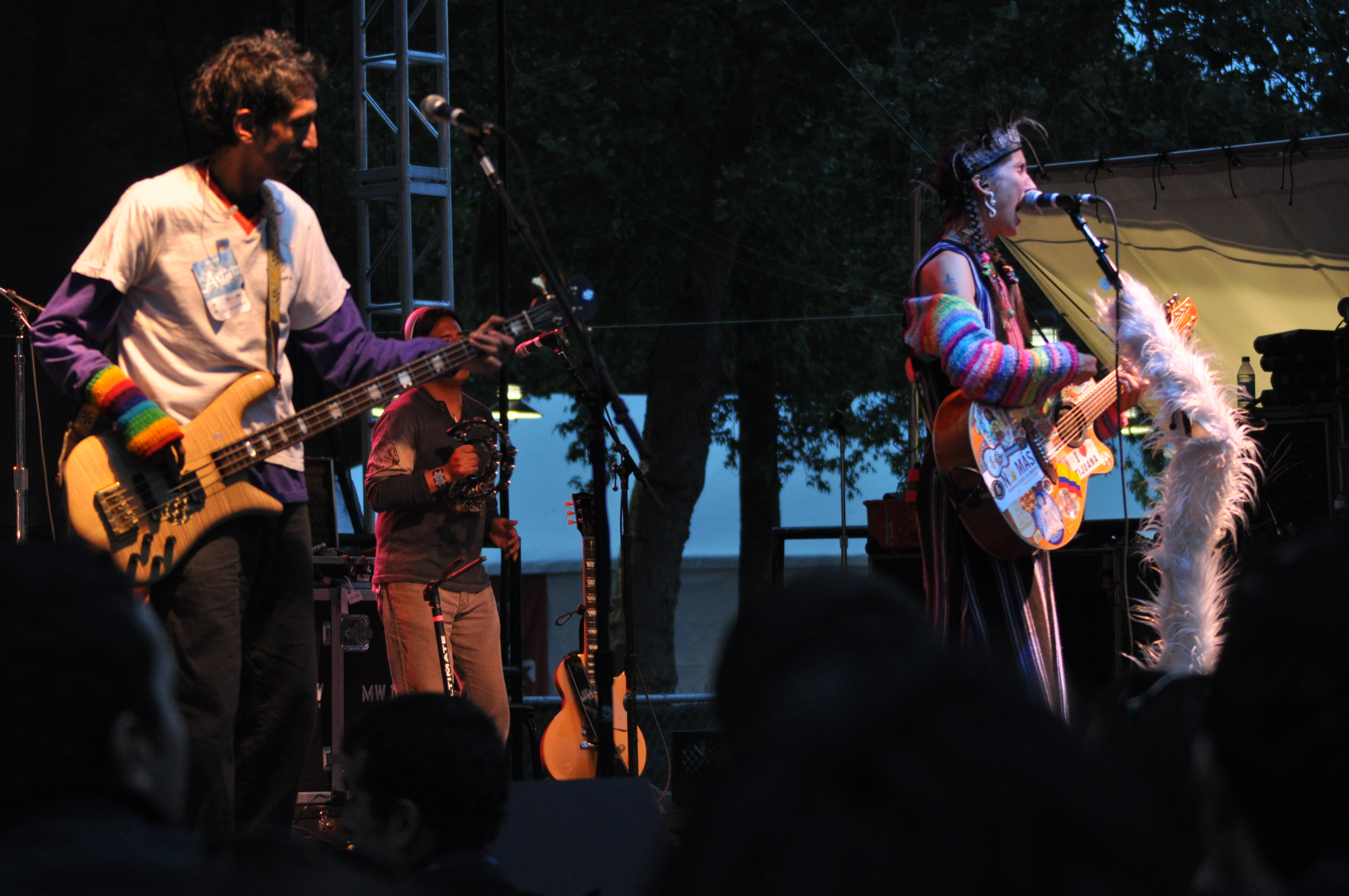
Two-time winners Aterciopelados.

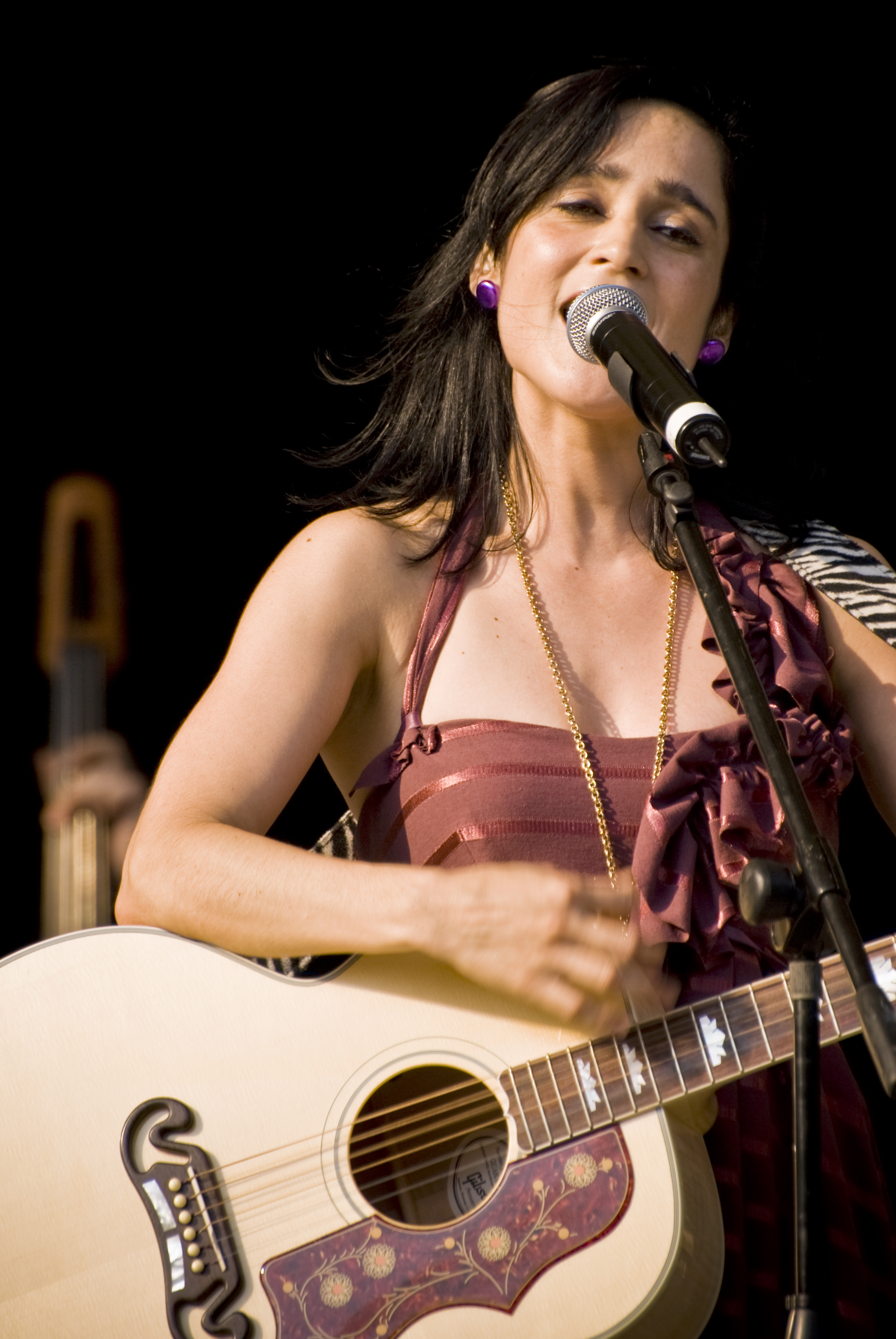
Two-time winner Julieta Venegas

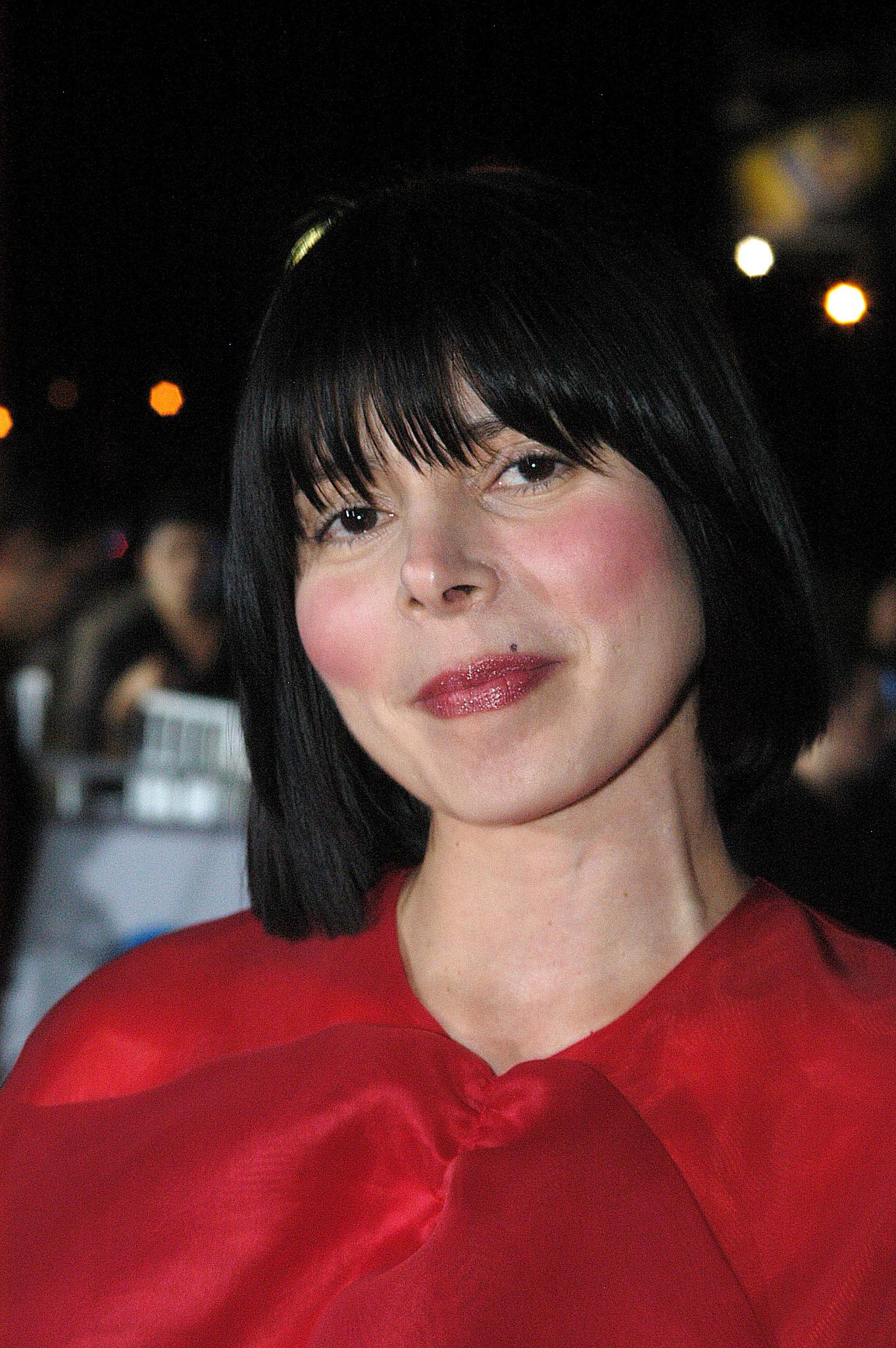
2010 winner Ely Guerra.

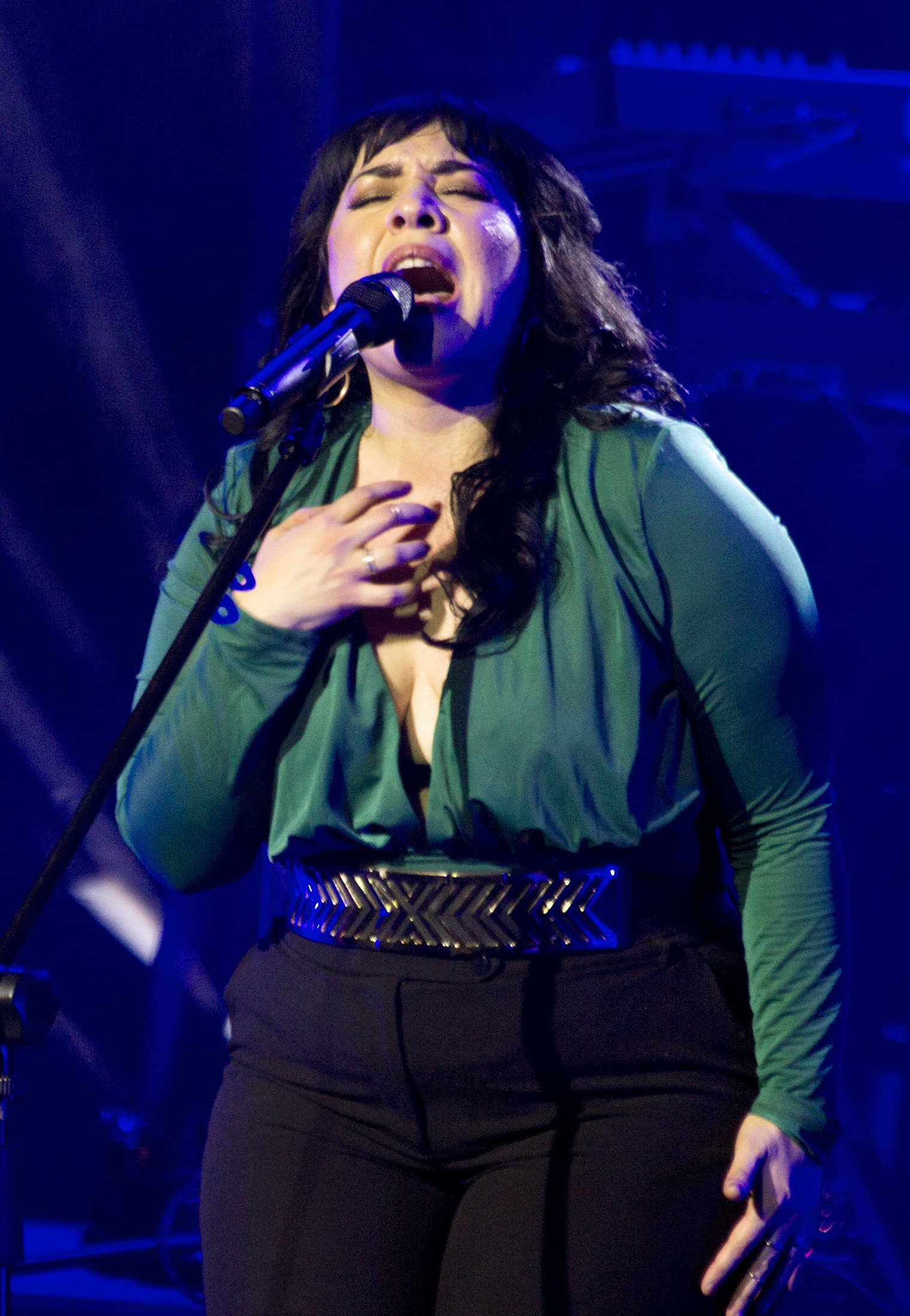
2012 winner Carla Morrison.

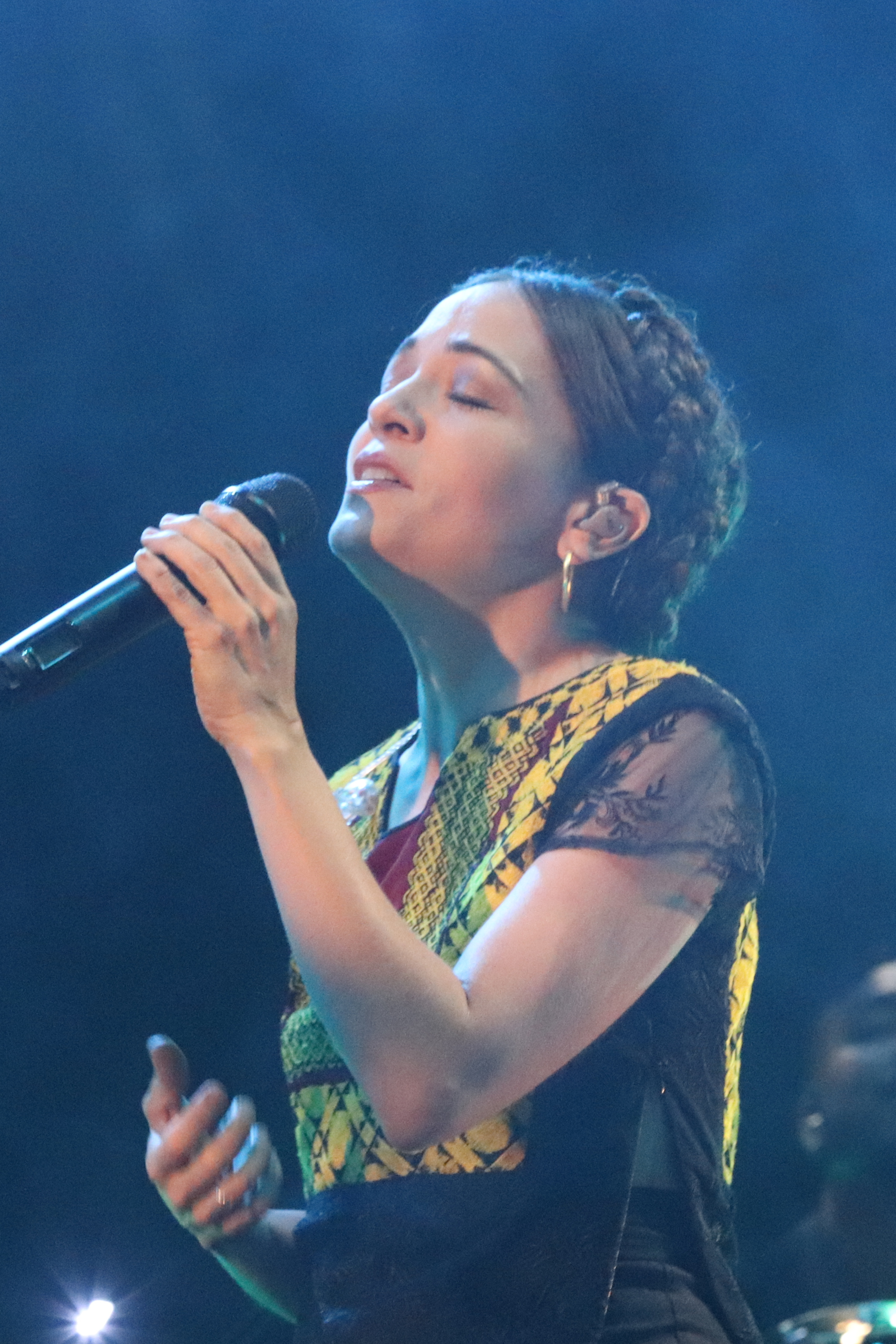
Two-time winner Natalia Lafourcade.

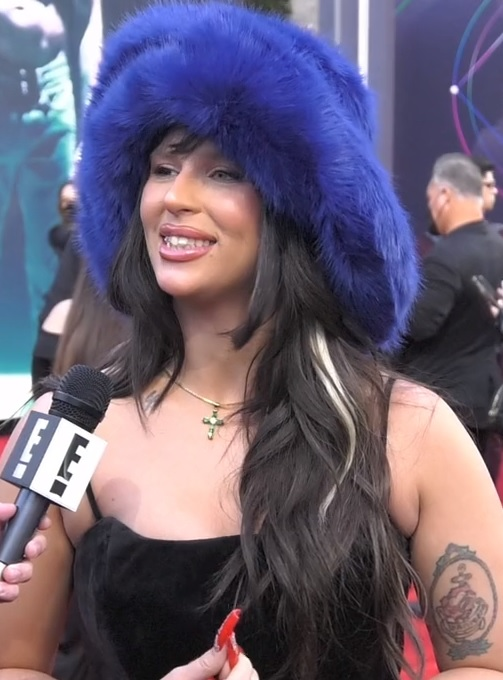
2021 winner Nathy Peluso.

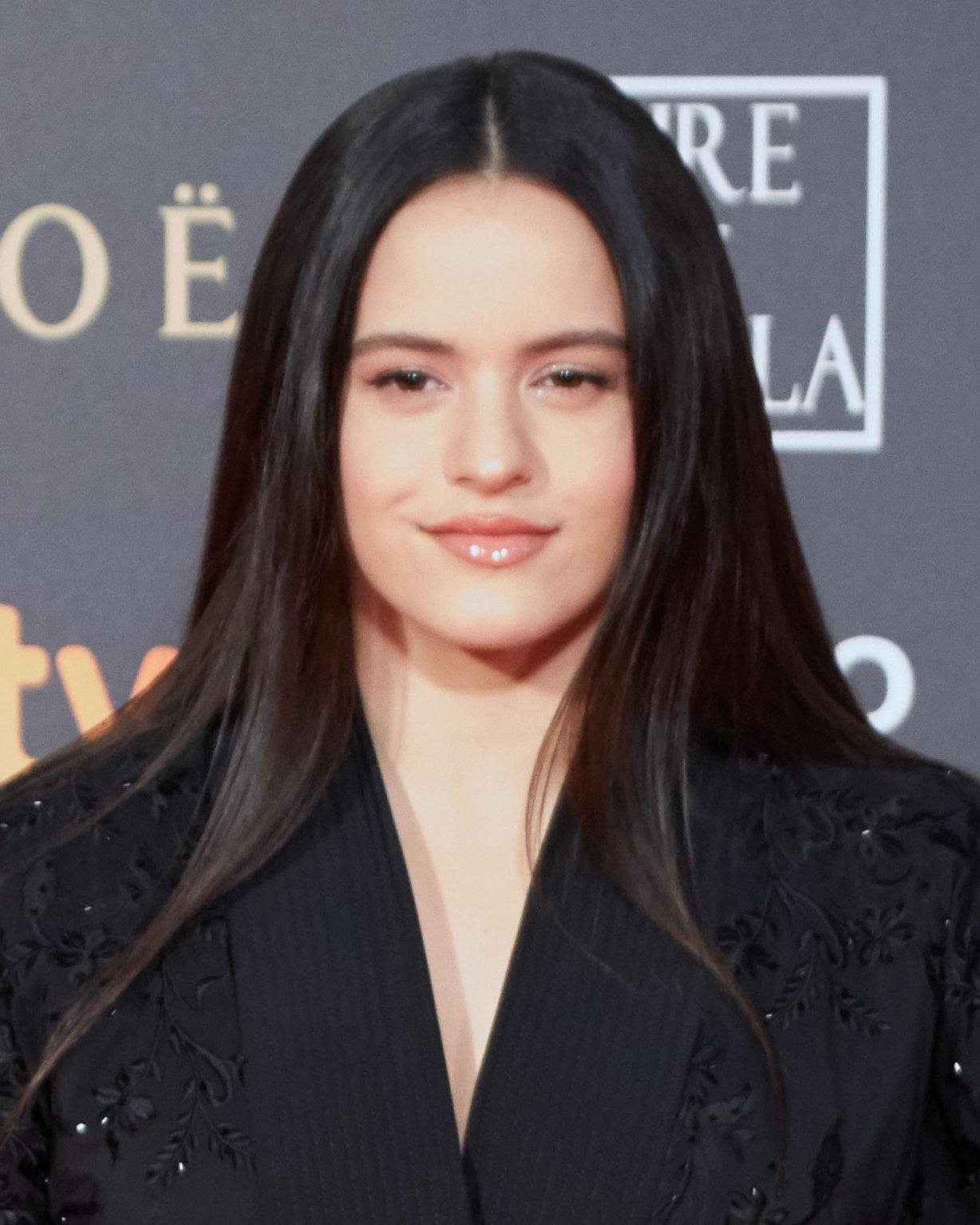
Two-time Winner Rosalía has won this award and Album of the Year both times in 2022 and 2026.

Year	Performing artist(s)	Work	Nominees	Ref.
2004	Café Tacuba	Cuatro Caminos	Babasónicos – Infame; Kinky – Atlas; Ozomatli – Coming Up; Plastilina Mosh – Hola Chicuelos	
2005	Ozomatli	Street Signs	Circo – En El Cielo De Tu Boca; Ely Guerra – Sweet & Sour, Hot y Spicy; Los Amigos Invisibles – The Venezuelan Zinga Son, Vol. 1; Los Rabanes – Ecolecua	
2006	Julieta Venegas	Limón y Sal	Babasónicos – Anoche; Café Tacuba – Un Viaje; Nortec Collective – Tijuana Sessions Vol. 3; Pastora – La Vida Moderna	
2007	Aterciopelados	Oye	Kevin Johansen – Logo; Kinky – Reina; Vicentico – Los Pájaros; Zoé – Memo Rex Commander y el Corazón Atómico de la Vía Láctea	
2008	Julieta Venegas	MTV Unplugged	Babasónicos – Mucho; Café Tacuba – Si No; Circo – Cursi; Manu Chao – La Radiolina	
2009	Los Amigos Invisibles	Comercial	Babasónicos – Mucho +; Kinky – Barracuda; Novalima – Coba Coba; Zoé – Reptilectric	
2010	Ely Guerra	Hombre Invisible	Banda de Turistas – Magical Radiophonic Heart; Bengala – Oro; El Cuarteto de Nos – Bipolar; Perrozompopo – CPC (Canciones Populares Contestatarias)	
2011	Zoé	MTV Unplugged/Música de Fondo	Doctor Krápula – Corazón Bombea/Vivo; Fidel Nadal – Forever Together; Carla Morrison – Mientras Tu Dormias; Mr. Pauer – Soundtrack	
2012	Carla Morrison	Déjenme Llorar	Lisandro Aristimuño – Mundo Anfibio; ChocQuibTown – Eso Es Lo Que Hay; Ulises Hadjis – Cosas Perdidas; Kinky – Sueño de la Máquina	
2013	Natalia Lafourcade	Mujer Divina – Homenaje a Agustín Lara	Bomba Estéreo – Elegancia Tropical; Café Tacuba – El Objeto Antes Llamado Disco; Illya Kuryaki and the Valderramas – Chances; León Larregui – Solstis	
2014	Babasónicos	Romantisísmico	Caloncho – Fruta; Los Cafres – Los Cafres - 25 Años De Música!; Siddhartha – El Vuelo Del Pez; Sig Ragga – Aquelarre	
2015	Natalia Lafourcade	Hasta la Raíz	Bomba Estéreo – Amanecer; Centavrvs – Sombras de Oro; Los Auténticos Decadentes – Y La Banda Sigue; Porter – Moctezuma	
2016	Illya Kuryaki & The Valderramas	L.H.O.N.	Bebe – Cambio de Piel; Esteman – Caótica Belleza; Mon Laferte – Mon Laferte - Vol. 1; Carla Morrison – Amor Supremo	
2017	Café Tacuba	Jei Beibi	El Cuarteto de Nos – Apocalipsis Zombi; Mon Laferte – La Trenza; Sig Ragga – La Promesa de Thamar; Danay Suárez – Palabras Manuales	
2018	Aterciopelados	Claroscura	Dante Spinetta – Puñal; Telmary – Fuerza Arará; Vetusta Morla – Mismo Sitio, Distinto Lugar; Zoé – Aztlan	
2019	Mon Laferte	Norma	Alex Anwandter – Latinoamericana; Babasónicos – Discutible; Bandalos Chinos – BACH; Marilina Bertoldi – Prender Un Fuego	
2020	Cultura Profética	Sobrevolando	Hello Seahorse! – Disco Estimulante; LOUTA – 2030; Lido Pimienta – Miss Colombia; Barbi Recanati – Ubicación en Tiempo Real	
2021	Nathy Peluso	Calambre	Arca – KiCk i; Aterciopelados – Tropiplop; Cabra – Cabra; Café Tacvba – Un Segundo MTV Unplugged	
2022	Rosalía	Motomami (Digital Album)	Afro-Andean Funk – The Sacred Leaf; Arca – KICK ii; Bomba Estéreo – Deja; CA7RIEL – El Disko	
2023	Monsieur Periné	Bolero Apocalíptico	Cabra – Martínez; iLe – Nacarile; Dante Spinetta – Mesa Dulce; Zahara – Reputa	
2024	Mon Laferte	Autopoiética	Dillom – Por Cesárea; Hello Seahorse! – Hiper; Nicole Horts – Nica; Ali Stone – Pandora; Wos – DESCARTABLE	
2025	Ca7riel & Paco Amoroso	Papota	Marilina Bertoldi – Para Quién Trabajas Vol. I; Judeline – Bodhiria; Latin Mafia – Todos los Días Todo el Día; Rusowsky – Daisy	
2026	Rosalía	Lux (Complete Works)	Cuerpos, Vol. 1 – Babasonicos; Desde el Coma – Bruses; Free Spirits – Ca7riel & Paco Amoroso; Demian – Teo Planell	

== Most Wins ==
==== 2 Wins ====
- Aterciopelados
- Café Tacuba
- Julieta Venegas
- Mon Laferte
- Natalia Lafourcade
- Rosalía

== Notes ==
^{^[I]} Each year is linked to the article about the Latin Grammy Awards held that year.
^{^[II]} The name of the performer and the nominated album.
