= Babasónicos discography =

- Studio albums: 13
- Soundtrack albums: 1
- Live albums: 2
- Compilation albums: 1
- B-sides: 3
- Remix albums: 4

The discography of the Argentine rock band Babasónicos encompasses thirteen studio albums.

== Albums ==
=== Studio albums ===
List of studio albums, with selected details
Title	Details
Pasto	Released: 1992; Label: Sony Music; Format:
Trance Zomba	Released: 1994; Label: Sony Music; Format:
Dopádromo	Released: 1996; Label: Sony Music; Format:
Babasónica	Released: 1997; Label: Sony Music; Format:
Miami	Released: 1999; Label: Sony Music; Format:
Jessico	Released: 2001; Label: Popartdiscos; Format:
Infame	Released: 2003; Label: Popartdiscos; Format:
Anoche	Released: 2005; Label: Universal Music; Format:
Mucho	Released: 2008; Label: Universal Music; Format:
A propósito	Released: 2011; Label: Universal Music; Format:
Romantisísmico	Released: 2013; Label: Sony Music; Format:
Discutible	Released: 2018; Label: Sony Music; Format:
Trinchera	Released: 2022; Label: Popartdiscos; Format:

=== B-sides albums ===
Year	Title
1998	Vórtice Marxista
2000	Vedette
2000	Groncho
2009	Mucho +
2011	Carolo
2016	Inflame

=== Remix albums ===
Year	Title
2000	Babasónica Electrónica
2002	Jessico Megamix
2002	Jessico Dance Mix
2005	Mezclas Infame (Disc One: Mezclas Infame, Disc Two: Cuatro Putitas)

=== Soundtrack albums ===
Year	Title
2007	Las Mantenidas Sin Sueños

=== Live albums ===
Year	Title
2007	Luces
2016	Desde Adentro - Impuesto de Fe
2017	Repuesto de Fe

=== EPs albums ===
Year	Title
2001	Deléctrico
2012	Babasónicos Vs. El Público (feat. Bruno Galindo)
2015	Shambala
2017	Volumen 1
2020	Suficiente
2020	Delivery 1 (Buenos Aires)
2020	Delivery 2 (México)
2021	Delivery 3 (Berlín)
