= Vórtice Marxista =

1998 album by Babasónicos

Studio album by Babasónicos
- Released: 1998
- Recorded: 1992–1996
- Genre: Rock, alternative rock experimental rock, trip-hop
- Label: Bultaco Records
- Producer: Babasónicos

Babasónicos chronology
Babasónica (1997)	Vórtice Marxista (1998)	Miami (1999)

Vórtice Marxista (Marxist Vortex) is the first b-sides album by Argentine rock group Babasónicos. It consists of tracks that were left out of their first three albums: Pasto, Trance Zomba and Dopádromo.

== Track listing ==
1. "Larga Siesta" (Long Nap)
2. "Fioritos"
3. "Antonio Fargas"
4. "La Muerte es Mujer" (Death is a Woman)
5. "Chingolo Zenith"
6. "Los Clonos de J.T." (The Clones of J.T.)
7. "Forajidos de Siempre" (Usual Outlaws)
8. "Cerebros en Su Tinta" (Brains in Their Ink)
9. "Traicionero" (Treacherous)
10. "Fórmica"
11. "Bananeado" (Banana-ed)
