= Las Mantenidas Sin Sueños (album) =

Soundtrack album by Babasónicos
- Released: 15 April 2007
- Recorded: 2003
- Genre: Alternative Rock; Soft Rock
- Length: 19:58
- Label: Universal Music

Babasónicos chronology
Mezclas Infame (2005)	Las Mantenidas Sin Sueños (2007)	Mucho (2008)

Las Mantenidas Sin Sueños is the seventh studio album and first soundtrack album by Argentine alternative rock band Babasónicos for Vera Fogwill and Martín De Salvo's film of the same name. Composed in its entirety in 2003, its release was delayed until April 15, 2007, with the film being finally released in Argentina 11 days later.

"Las Mantenidas", "Mantel Bucólico" and "Rápido y Juntos" are the only songs with vocals; the rest are either short instrumentals or variations on one of these songs, with the exception of "Las Fantasmas", an instrumental track mixed with dialogue from the movie.

== Track listing ==
1. "Insomnio" (Insomnia) – 1:49
2. "Las Mantenidas" (The Kept Ones) – 2:47
3. "Mantel Bucólico – Piano" (Bucolic Table Cloth – Piano) – 1:44
4. "Llegar a Nada" (Arrive to Nothing) – 0:40
5. "Chau Puerta" (Bye Door) – 0:39
6. "Mantel Bucólico" (Bucolic Table Cloth) – 3:08
7. "Azúcar" (Sugar) – 0:34
8. "Las Mantenidas – Piden Pista" (The Kept – Preparing for Takeoff) – 1:59
9. "Las Fantasmas" (The Ghosts) – 3:06
10. "Mantel Bucólico – Versión Flora" (Bucolic Table Cloth – Flora Version) – 1:20
11. "Rápido y Juntos" (Quickly and Together) – 2:12
