= Groncho =

2000 album by Babasónicos

Studio album by Babasónicos
- Released: July 2000
- Recorded: 1999
- Genre: Rock
- Label: Bultaco Records
- Producer: Daniel Melero, Babasónicos

Babasónicos chronology
Babasónica Electrónica (2000)	Groncho (2000)	Vedette (2000)

Groncho is the third b-side album by Argentine rock group Babasónicos. It's completely made of tracks that didn't make the cut for 1999's Miami.

== Launch ==
The band, after ending its contractual relationship with Sony Music, took the opportunity to relaunch different materials that Sony had not wanted to support. Thus, through Bultaco Discos, his own label, he released Groncho, among other B sides and remixes. At that time, Babasónicos was in the year 2000 without a record label and with an economic crisis that did not predict any future for anyone, least of all for a rock band.

== Track listing ==
1. "Demasiado" (Too Much)
2. "La Pincheta"
3. "Drogas... ¿Para Qué?" (Drugs... What For?)
4. "El Súbito" (The Sudden)
5. "Promotora" (Promoter)
6. "Pavadas" (Nonsense)
7. "Pop Silvia"
8. "Clase Gata" (Bitch Class)
9. "Boogie Boutique"
