= Aztlán (album) =

Studio album by Zoé
- Released: 18 April 2018
- Recorded: January–September 2017
- Studio: Panorama Studios (Mexico City)
- Genre: Alternative rock
- Length: 54:56
- Label: EMI Music Mexico; Universal Music Mexico
- Producer: Phil Vinall; Sergio Acosta

Zoé chronology
Zoé: Panoramas (Música Original De La Película) (2017)	Aztlán (2018)	Sonidos De Karmática Resonancia (2021)

Singles from Aztlán
- 1. "Azul" Released: 1 March 2018; 2. "Hielo" Released: 9 June 2018; 3. "No hay mal que dure" Released: 15 November 2018

Professional ratings
Review scores
Source	Rating
Indie Rocks!	7/10
Mondo Sonoro	8/10 stars

Aztlán is the sixth studio album by Mexican rock band Zoé. It was released on 18 April 2018 through EMI and Universal. The album is the band's first work in four years since Prográmaton (2013). Aztlán was produced by longtime Zoé producer Phil Vinall, and Craig Silvey, collaborating with Zoé for the first time. Silvey's influence brought new sounds and recording techniques to this album and helped set it apart from Prográmaton. Lead singer León Larregui has described the genre of the album as rock or rock-pop.

Aztlán was included on Rolling Stone's list of 10 Best Latin Albums of 2018 and later went on to win the Grammy Award for Best Latin Rock, Urban or Alternative Album on February 10, 2019. Previously, the album had been nominated for the Latin Grammy Award for Best Alternative Music Album but did not win. As a result, the Grammy win came as a complete surprise to the band, as they did not attend the award ceremony, with the band members finding out about winning the award through tweets and chat messages. The album was supported by three singles: "Azul", "Hielo", and "No hay mal que dure".

== Background ==
Aztlán was recorded from January to September 2017 at Panorama Studios in Mexico City.

== Release ==
Before the release of Aztlán, on 18 April 2018, Zoé held a surprise concert at Glorieta de los Insurgentes in Mexico City, where they performed songs from the album. After that performance, the album was released digitally the same day; the physical editions followed on 20 April. To promote the album, the band embarked on a world tour across North America, South America, and Europe, that concluded on 29 June 2019 at Auditorio Nacional in Mexico City.

The album is named after Aztlán, the mythical ancestral homeland of the Aztec people, and according to Larregui, it was chosen out of pride for their Mexican culture. Larregui has also described the "Aztlán" theme of the album as "an invitation to people to reflect on their own cultures and ideas." The album cover features an original oil painting by Larregui, presumably depicting the departure of the Aztecs from Aztlán before founding the city of Tenochtitlan in the present day valley of Mexico.

=== Singles ===
Aztlán was supported by three singles. The album's lead single, "Azul", was released on 1 March 2018 with its music video the same day. On 9 June 2018, "Hielo", along with a music video, followed as the second single. The band released "No hay mal que no dure" and its video on 15 November 2018 as the album's third and final single.

"Temor y temblor" was released on 23 March 2018 as the first promotional single. "Clarividad", the second promotional single, followed on 6 April 2018.

== Track listing ==
Aztlán track listing
No.	Title	Length
1.	"Venus"	4:14
2.	"Azul"	3:14
3.	"No hay mal que dure"	4:52
4.	"Al final"	4:34
5.	"Hielo"	5:02
6.	"Luci"	4:07
7.	"Aztlán"	3:39
8.	"Temor y temblor"	5:28
9.	"Renacer"	6:14
10.	"Ella es magia"	4:08
11.	"Oropel"	4:21
12.	"Clarividad"	5:03
Total length:		54:56

== Charts ==
=== Weekly charts ===
Weekly chart performance for Aztlán
Chart (2018)	Peak position
Mexican Albums (AMPROFON)	3

=== Year-end charts ===
Year-end chart performance for Aztlán
Chart (2018)	Position
Mexican Albums (AMPROFON)	18

== Certifications ==
Certifications for Aztlán
Region	Certification	Certified units/sales
Mexico (AMPROFON)	Platinum	60,000^{‡}
^{‡} Sales+streaming figures based on certification alone.
