= Anoche (disambiguation) =

Anoche (Spanish for "last night") may refer to:

- Anoche, a 2005 studio album by Babasónicos
- "Anoche", a song by Arca from Arca
- "Anoche", a song by Rauw Alejandro
