= Los Premios MTV Latinoamérica for Best Rock Artist =

Latino MTV award

This is a list of the Los Premios MTV Latinoamérica winners and nominees for Best Rock Artist.

Year	Winner	Other nominees
2002	La Ley	Aterciopelados; Babasónicos; Catupecu Machu; Juanes
2003	Juanes	Gustavo Cerati; Jaguares; La Ley; Maná
2004	La Ley	Babasónicos; Bersuit Vergarabat; Fobia; Vicentico
2005	Juanes	Babasónicos; Catupecu Machu; Lucybell; Moderatto
2006	Maná	Babasónicos; Bersuit; Fobia; Gustavo Cerati
2007	Babasónicos	Bersuit Vergarabat; Catupecu Machu; Gustavo Cerati; Moderatto
2008	Juanes	Babasónicos; Gustavo Cerati; Moderatto; Motel
2009	Zoé	Andrés Calamaro; Los Fabulosos Cadillacs; Moderatto; Motel
