= Vedette (album) =

Studio album by Babasónicos
- Released: June 2000
- Recorded: 1996–1997
- Genre: Rock
- Label: Bultaco Records

Babasónicos chronology
Groncho (2000)	Vedette (2000)	Jessico (2001)

Vedette is the second b-side album by Argentine rock group Babasónicos. It contains tracks that didn't make the cut for Babasónica.

== Track listing ==
1. "Dopamina" (Dopamine)
2. "Muchacha Magnética" (Magnetic Girl)
3. "Su Auto Dejó de Funcionar" (Your Car Stopped Working)
4. "La Hiedra Crece" (The Ivy Grows)
5. "Italia 2000" (Italy 2000)
6. "Vórtice" (Vortex)
7. "YSL" (Yves Saint Laurent)
8. "Bandido" (Bandit)
9. "Chupa Gas" (Gas Sucker)
10. "Careta de Acassuso" (Liar from Acassuso)
11. "La Salamandra" (The Salamander)
12. "Arenas Movedizas" (Quicksands)
