= A Propósito =

2011 album by Babasónicos

Studio album by Babasónicos
- Released: May 17, 2011
- Recorded: 2010 – 2011
- Genre: Alternative rock
- Label: Universal Music Latino
- Producer: Babasónicos

Babasónicos chronology
| Mucho + (2009) | A Propósito (2011) | Romantisísmico (2013) |

A Propósito (By the Way [can also mean On Purpose]) is the tenth studio album by Argentine rock band Babasónicos, released in May 2011.

== Track listing ==
| No. | Title | Writer(s) | Length |
|---|---|---|---|
| 1. | "Flora y Fauno" (Flora & Faun) | M.Dominguez, D.Tuñón, A.Rodríguez | 4:11 |
| 2. | "Fiesta popular" (Popular Party) | M. Dominguez | 3:26 |
| 3. | "Tormento / Pulpito" (Torment / Little Octopus) | A.Rodríguez / D.Tuñón, A.Rodríguez | 5:56 |
| 4. | "Deshoras" (Unsesasonable Time) | M.Dominguez, A.Rodríguez | 3:35 |
| 5. | "Ideas" | A.Rodríguez, D.Tuñón | 4:00 |
| 6. | "En privado" (In Private) | M.Dominguez, A.Rodríguez | 3:56 |
| 7. | "Muñeco de Haiti / El Sultán / Jaula" (Haiti Doll / The Sultan / Cage) | D.Tuñón, A.Rodríguez, D.Rodríguez / D.Castellano / D.Tuñón, D.Rodríguez | 9:01 |
| 8. | "El pupilo" (The Pupil) | A.Rodríguez, D.Rodríguez | 3:42 |
| 9. | "Barranca abajo" (Deep Hollow) | M.Dominguez, A.Rodríguez | 2:36 |
| 10. | "Chisme de zorro" (Fox Gossip) | M.Dominguez, A.Rodríguez | 3:27 |
