= MTV Unplugged/Música de fondo =

MTV Unplugged: Música de fondo

Live album by Zoé
- Released: March 22, 2011
- Recorded: October 5, 2010; Churubusco Studios (Mexico City)
- Genres: Alternative music, psychedelic rock
- Length: 60:00 (CD)
- Languages: Spanish; English
- Label: EMI Music
- Producers: Phil Vinall, Zoé

Zoé chronology
Reptilectric (2008)	MTV Unplugged: Música de fondo (2011)	Prográmaton (2013)

Singles from MTV Unplugged: Música de fondo
- 1. "Soñé" Released: January 10, 2011; 2. "Labios Rotos" Released: March 22, 2011; 3. "Luna" Released: October 27, 2011; 4. "Besame Mucho" Released: February 14, 2012

MTV Unplugged: Música de fondo (Spanish: MTV Unplugged: Background Music) is the second live album recorded by Mexican alternative rock band Zoé. It was released on March 22, 2011, and it debuted at number one on the Mexican albums chart. The album features a selection of their greatest hits from their previous records as well as a new song, "Labios Rotos". Música de fondo was awarded the Latin Grammy award for "Best Alternative Music Album" on November 10, 2011.

The band is joined by Denise Gutierrez (“Lo Blondo”), vocalist of the Mexican alternative group Hello Seahorse!, who sings harmony and duets with León Larreguí on several songs and then sings the lead vocals on “Luna” late in the set. Mexican rock musician Chetes also accompanies the band on guitar and keyboard on various songs. Two additional celebrity guest performers sing duets with Larreguí during the set: Adrián Dargelos of the Argentine band Babasónicos, who sings on “Dead”, and Spanish rock singer Enrique Bunbury (former lead singer of Héroes del Silencio), who sings on “Nada”.

== CD and DVD track listing ==
All tracks written by Zoé

No.	Title	Length
1.	"Sombras" ("Shadows")	4:50
2.	"Soñé" ("I Dreamt" feat. Denise Gutierrez)	3:52
3.	"Últimos Días" ("Last Days")	3:58
4.	"No Me Destruyas" ("Don't Destroy Me")	3:45
5.	"Labios Rotos" ("Torn Lips")	4:45
6.	"Dead" (feat. Adrián Dargelos)	4:09
7.	"Veneno" ("Poison")	4:19
8.	"Paula"	4:14
9.	"Infinito" ("Infinity")	4:34
10.	"Vía Lactea" ("Milky Way")	4:49
11.	"Poli / Love"	4:18
12.	"Luna" ("Moon" feat. Denise Gutierrez)	5:13
13.	"Nada" ("Nothing" feat. Enrique Bunbury)	5:02
14.	"Nunca" ("Never")	6:16

=== Special Edition ===
No.	Title	Length
15.	"Bésame Mucho" ("Kiss Me a Lot" feat. Denise Gutierrez)	5:37

=== DVD ===
No.	Title	Length
1.	"Making of Background Music"	60:00
2.	"Labios Rotos (3D Rehearsal)"	4:45

== Charts and certifications ==
The album debuted at number one on the Mexican album charts for the week ending on March 27, 2011 replacing Viva el príncipe by Cristian Castro. The following week was replaced by Gloria Trevi's new album Gloria but it went back again to number one for another week and was replaced by Britney Spears's Femme Fatale and went back to number one the following week where it stayed for three weeks in a row. The album was also certified diamond, double platinum and gold for selling over 450,000 copies in Mexico. On March 19, 2020 the album was re-released in a limited edition for the 10th anniversary and four weeks later on April 16 return to number one on the Mexican albums chart.

Chart (2011)	Peak position
Mexican Album Chart	1
Chart (2020)	Peak position
Mexican Album Chart	1

=== Certifications ===
Region	Certification	Certified units/sales
Mexico (AMPROFON)	2× Diamond+Platinum+Gold	690,000^{^}
^{^} Shipments figures based on certification alone.

== Awards ==
At the 2011 Latin Grammy Awards in Las Vegas Música de fondo won Best Alternative Music Album and "Labios rotos" won Best Rock Song.
