= Zoé (band) =

Mexican rock band

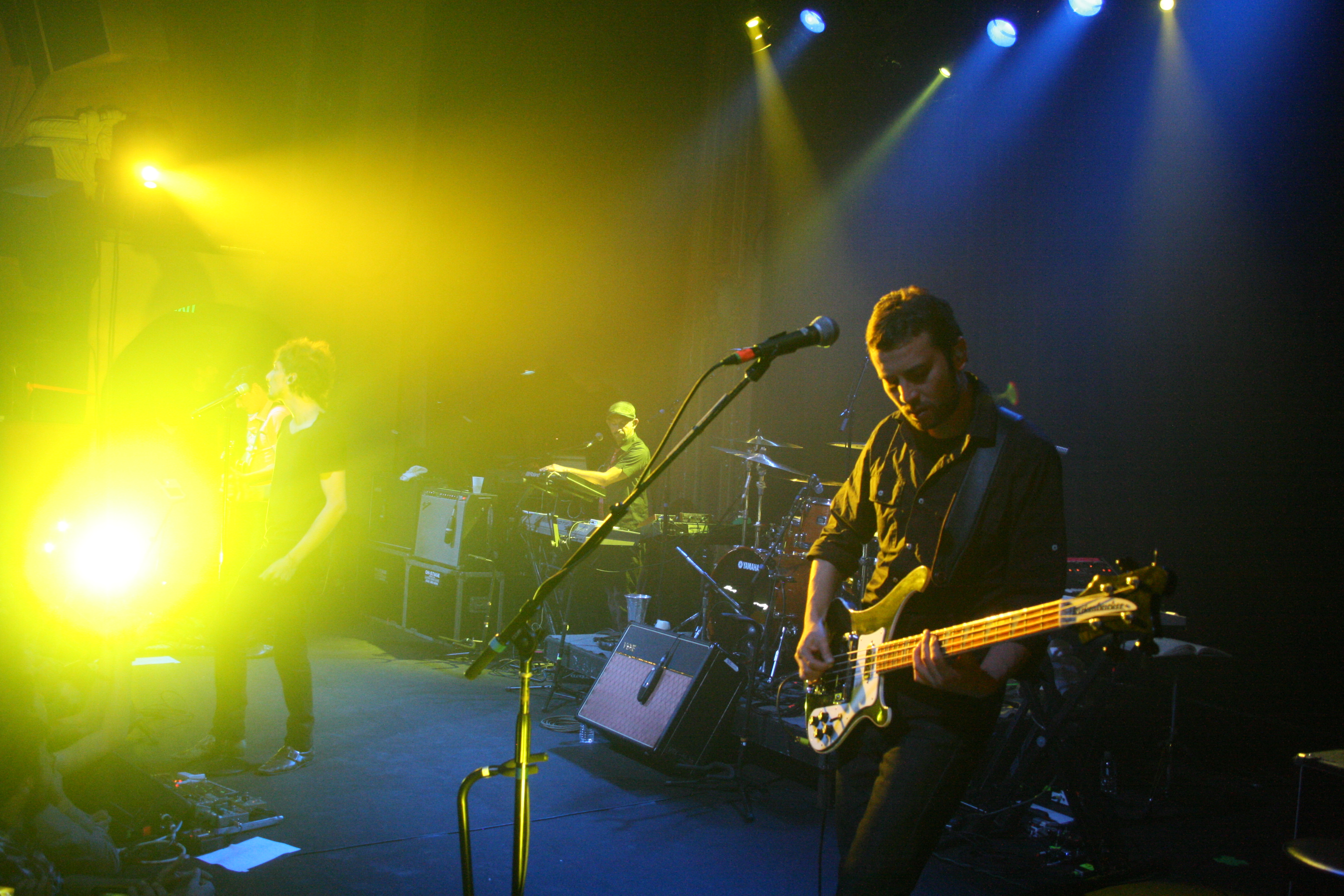

Background information
- Origin: Cuernavaca, Morelos, Mexico
- Genres: Alternative rock; neo-psychedelia; psychedelic rock; space rock
- Years active: 1994–present
- Labels: Sony (2001–2004); Noiselab (2005–2008); EMI (2008–2013); Universal (2013-Present)
- Members: León Larregui (vocals); Sergio Acosta (lead guitar); Jesus Baez (keyboards); Angel Mosqueda (bass guitar); Rodrigo Guardiola (drums)
- Past members: Siddhartha (drums); Alberto Cabrera (drums)
- Website: zoetheband.com

Zoé is a Grammy Award and Latin Grammy Award-winning Mexican rock band. It was initially formed in Cuernavaca, Mexico in 1994, although membership started to stabilize in 1997. The band has achieved success in Mexico and most Spanish-speaking countries with albums such as Rocanlover, Memo Rex Commander y el Corazón Atómico de la Vía Láctea and Reptilectric.

== History ==
Zoé began in Mexico in 1994, with influences from Seattle's grunge. The band went through a period of changing line-ups and varying styles before stabilizing in 1997, with León Larregui (guitar and voice), Sergio Acosta (guitar), Alberto Cabrera (drums), Ángel Mosqueda (bass guitar) and Jesus Báez (keyboards). By this time, a clear influence from The Beatles could be seen alongside Britpop and grunge stylings.

=== 1998–2004: Debut album and Rocanlover ===
Faced with a lack of venues in which to showcase their music, Zoé relied upon self-organized concerts, the Internet and a self-published demo. These efforts, along with positive word of mouth, helped them gain popularity in Spanish-language radio stations in the United States. They signed their first recording contract in 1998, but nothing came of it. They independently released an album in 2000 that attracted the attention of Sony Music, who took over its distribution. Popular songs from this recording included "Asteroide" and "Miel". Following the success of this album, some of their songs were included in the soundtracks of the movies Amar Te Duele, Ladies Night and The Dreamer.

In November 2003, Zoé released a second album, Rocanlover, produced by Phil Vinall, who had previously worked with bands like Placebo and Elastica. The album included the singles "Peace and Love", "Love" and "Veneno". In 2017, looking back at this period, Larreguí characterized this as a time of experimentation and trying different things; for example, the band had not decided if they wanted to record more songs in English.

=== 2004–2007: The Room, Rocanlover and Memo Rex Commander ===
Zoé left Sony in early 2004. The band kept working and touring during the year without a label behind them and started to gain a larger following with the self-promoted singles "Love" and "Veneno". In early 2005, the band started working on new songs for their next album. In 2005, the band had recorded the song "Dead" with their own resources. Also at this time, Cabrera left the band and Rodrigo Guardiola joined. Some major labels in Mexico were interested in signing the band, but Zoé, tired of their bad past experiences, signed an independent deal with Noiselab, a fast-growing independent label from Mexico. New songs to complete the EP, named The Room, were written. The EP sold over 50,000 copies and made it onto the Mexican sales chart. Some new songs were recorded in English, and some producers, like Alan McGee, expressed interest in taking them to the UK and Europe. The release of the EP was followed by two sold-out shows at the Metropolitan Theater in Mexico City and a national tour.

In 2006, Zoé played Vive Latino Festival and began production on their third studio album. In January, the band went to Manzanillo to start work with Phil Vinall. The band worked on basic tracking at Sonic Ranch Studios in Tornillo, Texas in March with mixing taking place in May and finishing in June. Memo Rex Commander y el Corazón Atómico de la Vía Láctea (Memo Rex Commander and the Atomic Heart of the Milky Way) was released on 12 July 2006, debuting on Mexican charts at number one. The first single from the album, "Vía Láctea", had some rotation in local music channels like MTV Latin America and Telehit. The album achieved gold status after more than 40,000 units sold in the four weeks after its release and it received positive reviews from the specialized press.

On 1 September 2006, Zoé performed in Mexico's National Auditorium, a sold-out show in one of the most important stages for music in Mexico. Later, at the Palacio de los Deportes, they performed with Nick McCarthy, the guitarist (and sometimes vocalist) from the Scottish band Franz Ferdinand. In November 2006, they toured with Gustavo Cerati and Los Tres in Mexico and the United States. On 28 November 2007, they recorded their first live CD/DVD, in the Palacio de los Deportes ("Sports Palace"), released as 281107.

=== 2008–2010: Reptilectric ===
In fall 2008, Zoé released a fourth album, Reptilectric. Containing 11 tracks, all in Spanish, Reptilectric signalled the end of Zoé's experimentation with writing and recording songs in English. It was produced by Phill Vinall. The title track was released as the first single on 8 September. The album debuted at number one on the Mexican charts and it was subsequently certified platinum for over 80,000 copies sold there. The band toured in support of the album in Mexico, Latin America, the United States and Spain. A remix album called Reptilectric Revisitado was released in October 2009, with remixed versions of the songs on the original album as well as cover versions by other Latin American artists. In Spain, the band released 01-10, a compilation album of some of the band's biggest hits and new versions of songs from Reptilectric and Memo Rex Commander featuring the Spanish artists Enrique Bunbury, Anni B. Sweet, Dorian and Vetusta Morla. The band performed at Coachella in support of Reptilectric.

=== 2011–2012: Música de Fondo ===
In March 2011, the band released an MTV Unplugged album titled MTV Unplugged/Música de fondo, with new interpretations of their biggest hits as well as new music. Guest performers included Adrian Dargelos, Enrique Bunbury, Chetes and Denise Gutiérrez of Hello Seahorse!. Four singles were released from the album: "Soñé", "Labios Rotos", "Luna" and a cover version of "Bésame Mucho". With this album, the band was nominated for awards at the Latin Grammys, Lunas Del Auditorio and MTV Europe Music Awards. In October 2011, the album went gold in Colombia, the band's first album to do so outside of Mexico. As a personal thank you for the overwhelming success of this album, the band released a special single called "Energía" ("Energy") in February 2012.

=== 2013–2019: Prográmaton and Aztlán ===
Zoé released a fifth album, Prográmaton, and announced an extended tour of 75 shows in 16 countries. In this new stage, Zoé presented what could be labeled their most mature and experimental work. The personnel who achieved this combination of music, lyrics and instrumental talents are Leon Larregui (vocals, guitar), Sergio Acosta (guitar), Jesús Báez (keyboards), Angel Mosqueda (bass guitar) and Rodrigo Guardiola (drums).

After a two-year break where they launched a documentary called Panoramas and where Larregui released his second solo album Voluma, Zoé released the single "Azul" on 1 March 2018. Weeks later, the singles "Temor y Temblor" and "Clarividad" were also released, announcing their inclusion in the album Aztlán (album), which was released on 20 April 2018. To promote the album, the band embarked on the Zoé Tour 2018-2019, with shows in Mexico, other Latin American countries like Peru and Argentina, Spain and the United States.

=== 2020-Present: Sonidos de Karmática Resonancia and REXSEXEX ===
In September 2020 the band was featured on former band member Siddartha's single La Ciudad (Cap. 6) (The City Chapter. 6) off his album MEMORIA FUTURO (FUTURE MEMORY).

On May 14, 2020 Zoé released SKR, the first single for their upcoming album Sonidos de Karmática Resonancia (Sounds of Karmatic Resonance). The band would release 4 additional singles to promote the album: Fiebre (Fever), Karmadame, El Duelo (Grief) and Velur (Velour) before its release on April 16, 2021. The band embarked on the Sonidos de Karmática Resonancia Tour in 2022 to promote the album with 36 concerts between January and December 2022 in 6 countries.. This was their first album since their debut without longtime collaborator Phil Vinall.

On October 25th, 2024, the band announced their presence at the 2025 Vive Latino music festival in March 2025, their first concert since 2022. Despite the band's frontman León Larregui stating that this would be their only concert of the year, on April 25th they announced a standalone concert on October 2nd at Estadio GNP Seguros called MEMOREX + REXSEXEX Y MÁS (MEMOREX + REXSEXEX AND MORE).

Due to popular demand, the group added 5 more shows to their stay at Estadio GNP Seguros, becoming the first Mexican act to sell out the venue 4 or more times.

To promote the concerts, the band released two singles, their first releases since 2021. The first, Campo de Fuerza (Force Field) was originally teased on August 8th, formally announced on August 10th and released on August 14th, 2025. The second single, REXSEXEX was released the following month on September 4th.

On November 14th the band also released Memo Rex Commander y el Corazón Atómico de la Vía Láctea En Vivo, a live album featuring the 10 spanish-language songs from the original Memo Rex Commander album recorded live at the recent concerts in Estadio GNP Seguros.

Zoe's 2025 was marked by a successful special reunion tour called the “MEMOREX + REXSEXEX Tour” in Mexico, including multiple sold-out dates at Estadio GNP in Mexico City (CDMX) and appearances at festivals such as Vive Latino and Festival Cordillera. They also released a new album in September 2025, marking a major comeback for the Mexican rock band after some time away. The band also played concerts at smaller music festivals during 2025 in Bogotá, Guadalajara, Querétaro, Ciudad Juárez and Puebla.

== Tour ==
- Zoé MTV Unplugged Tour
- Zoé 281107 Tour
- Zoé 8.11.14 Tour
- Zoé 011025 Tour

== Discography ==
=== Studio albums ===
- Zoé (2001)
- Rocanlover (2003)
- Memo Rex Commander y el Corazón Atómico de la Vía Láctea (2006)
- Reptilectric (2008)
- Prográmaton (2013)
- Aztlán (2018)
- Sonidos de Karmática Resonancia (2021)

=== EP ===
- The Room (EP) (2005)

=== Compilations ===
- Grandes Hits (2005)
- Noiselab 001 (2002)
- Zoé Hits 01–06 (2006)
- Reptilectric Revisitado (2009)
- 01-10 (2010)

=== Live albums ===
- 281107 (2008)
- MTV Unplugged/Música de Fondo (2011)
- 8.11.14 (2015)
- Memo Rex Commander y el Corazón Atómico de la Vía Láctea (2025)
- 011025 (En Vivo) (2026)

=== Singles ===
- "Deja te Conecto" (2001) ("Let Me Connect You")
- "Asteroide" (2002) ("Asteroid")
- "Miel" (2002) ("Honey")
- "Peace and Love" (2003)
- "Love" (2004)
- "Veneno" (2004) ("Poison")
- "Dead" (2005)
- "Vía Láctea" (2006) ("Milky Way")
- "No me Destruyas" (2006) ("Don't Destroy Me")
- "Paula" (2007)
- "Reptilectric" (2008)
- "Nada" (2009) ("Nothing")
- "Poli" (2009)
- "Labios Rotos" (2010) ("Torn Lips")
- "Luna" (2011) ("Moon")
- "Bésame Mucho" (2011) ("Kiss me a lot")
- "Energía" (2012) ("Energy")
- "10 A.M." (2013) ("10 A.M.")
- "Azul" (2018) ("Blue")
- "Temor y Temblor" (2018) (Fear and Trembling)
- "Clarividad" (2018) (Clarity)
- "SKR" (2020)
- "Fiebre" (2020) (Fever)
- "El Duelo" (2020) ("Grief")
- "Velur" (2021) (Velour)
- "Campo de Fuerza" (2025) (Force Field)
- "REXSEXEX" (2025)

== Awards and nominations ==
=== Grammy Awards ===
Year	Category	Nominated work	Result
2008	Best Latin Rock, Urban or Alternative Album	Memo Rex Commander y el Corazón Atómico de la Vía Láctea	Nominated
2019	Best Latin Rock, Urban or Alternative Album	Aztlán	Won
2021	Best Latin Rock, Urban or Alternative Album	Sonidos de Karmática Resonancia	Nominated

=== Latin Grammy Awards ===
Year	Category	Nominated work	Result
2007	Best Alternative Song	"No Me Destruyas"	Nominated
2007	Best Alternative Music Album	Memo Rex Commander y el Corazón Atómico de la Vía Láctea	Nominated
2009	Best Alternative Music Album	Reptilectric	Nominated
2009	Best Short Form Music Video	"Reptilectric"	Nominated
2011	Best Rock Song	"Labios Rotos"	Won
2011	Best Alternative Music Album	MTV Unplugged/Música de Fondo	Won
2011	Best Long Form Music Video	MTV Unplugged/Música de Fondo	Nominated
2012	Record of the Year	"Besame Mucho"	Nominated
2014	Best Short Form Music Video	"Arrullo de Estrellas"	Nominated
2018	Best Alternative Song	"Azul"	Nominated
2018	Best Long Form Music Video	"Panoramas"	Nominated
2018	Best Alternative Music Album	Aztlán	Nominated
