= Las Mantenidas Sin Sueños (film) =

2005 film by Martín De Salvo & Vera Fogwill

Las mantenidas sin sueños Kept and Dreamless (English title)
- Argentinian theatrical release poster
- Directed by: Martín De Salvo; Vera Fogwill
- Written by: Martín De Salvo, Vera Fogwill
- Starring: Vera Fogwill; Lucía Snieg; Mirta Busnelli; Mía Maestro; Gastón Pauls
- Cinematography: Nicolas Trovato
- Edited by: Rosario Suárez
- Music by: Babasónicos
- Release dates: 24 September 2005 (Silver Spring, Maryland); 26 April 2007 (Argentina)
- Running time: 97 minutes; 94 minutes (Brazil)
- Country: Argentina
- Language: Spanish

Kept and Dreamless (Spanish: Las Mantenidas Sin Sueños, lit. 'The Kept Without Dreams') is a 2005 Argentinian drama film directed by Vera Fogwill and Martín De Salvo. Starring Fogwill and Lucía Snieg, the film focuses on the struggles of Eugenia, a 10-year-old precocious child, and the bond with her cocaine-addicted, unemployed mother Florencia, as she tries to find a job for her when they discover Florencia is pregnant. The film also stars Mirta Busnelli, Mía Maestro, Edda Díaz, Elsa Berenguer and Gastón Pauls. Shown at the American Film Institute's Silver Theatre in Silver Spring, Maryland, on September 24, 2005, the film explores mother-daughter relationships in a reminiscent way of the work of Spanish director Pedro Sanchez.

== Cast ==
- Vera Fogwill as Florencia
- Lucía Snieg as Eugenia
- Edda Díaz as Olga
- Elsa Berenguer as Lola
- Gastón Pauls as Martín
- Mirta Busnelli as Sara
- Mía Maestro as Celina
- Julián Krakov as Santiago
- Pochi Ducasse as Sofía
- Alejandro Pérez as José
- Anahí Martella as Perla
- Cristina Jacobson as Martita
- María Ezilda Fernández as Marta
- María Carolina Fernández as Susana
- Alberto Ure as Juan

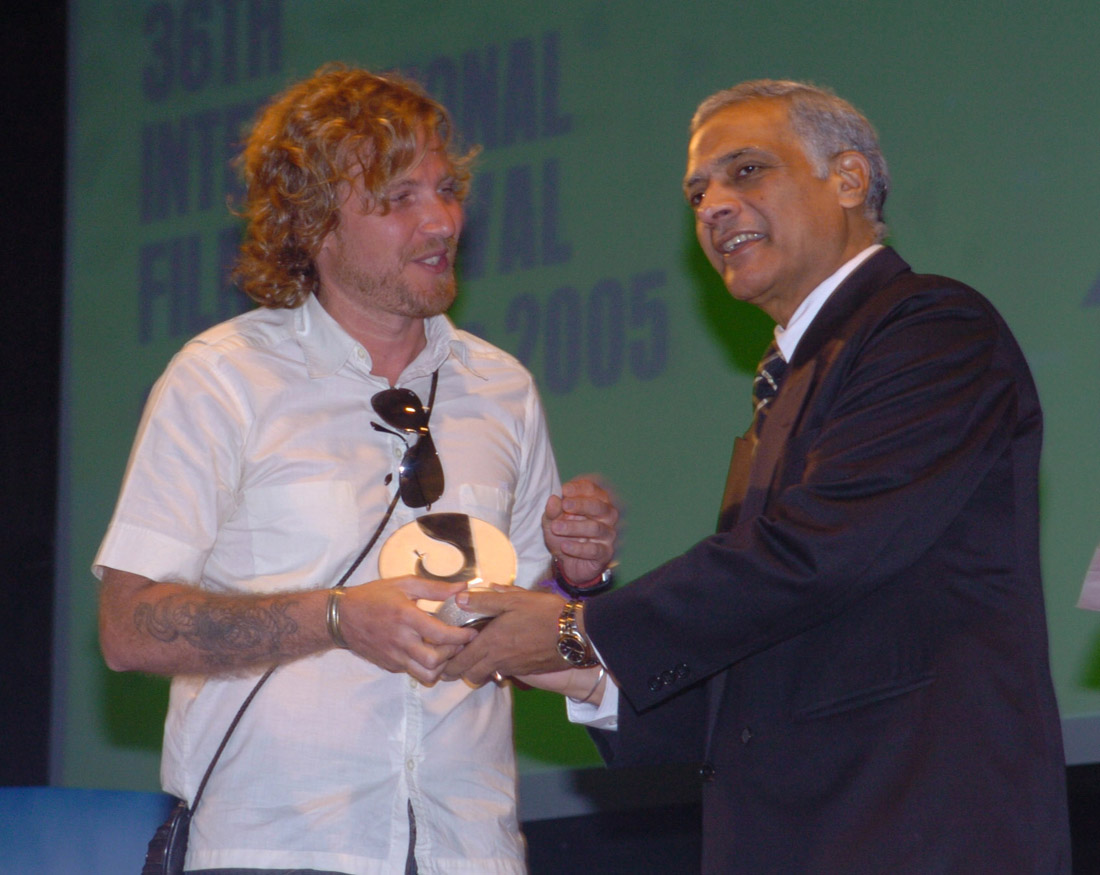
Director Martin Desalvo receiving Silver Peacock Award for the film at IFFI (2005)
