= Los Brujos =

Argentine rock band

Background information
- Origin: Turdera, Buenos Aires, Argentina
- Genres: Funk metal; beatcore; rock; psychedelic rock
- Years active: 1988–1998; 2014–present
- Labels: Estudios Aguilar; Epic
- Members: Gabriel Guerrisi (guitar); Alejandro Alaci (voice); Fabio Rey Pastrello (guitar); Quique Ilid (drums)
- Past members: Ricky Rua (voice) †; Sergio Moreno (bass); Gabriel "Gabo" Manelli (bass) †
- Website: losbrujos.com

Los Brujos (formed in 1988) is an Argentine rock band, part of the "New Argentine Rock" scene which became successful in the early 1990s.

== Members ==
- Gabriel Guerrisi: guitar
- Fabio "Rey" Pastrello: 2nd guitar
- Alejandro Alaci: voice
- Quique Ilid: drums

=== Former members ===
- Ricky Rua: voice (†)
- Gabriel "Gabo" Manelli: bass (†)
- Sergio Moreno: bass

== Synopsis ==
Combining 1960s beat sounds and 1980s hardcore, Los Brujos is an experimental group. In addition, their theatrical performances, where musicians created a special atmosphere around them, made Los Brujos a very visual rock act.

=== First discs (1988-1993) ===
Los Brujos had a good year in 1992; the single "Kanishka" from the album Fin de Semana Salvaje ("Savage Weekend"), was a chart-topper. Somewhat haphazardly produced by the band in terms of the concept, Daniel Melero, the producer, decided to let the album's sound stand as the disorganized naïveté of an adolescent band. It ranks as one of the best New Argentine rock records.

1993's San Cipriano was another strong performance by the band, which strengthened their status. In the two years following Los Brujos would perform on stage with the likes of Nirvana, Soda Stereo, Babasónicos, and Beastie Boys.

=== Guerra de nervios and separation (1995-1998) ===
Their third album, 1995's Guerra de Nervios had involved some cool musicians as Gustavo Cerati, Daniel Melero and Aitor of Juana la Loca. It was a disc with an awesome production, reminiscent of the best science fiction films.

After ten years together, Los Brujos announced their separation in 1998. With one of the major bands of the movement gone, their break-up was seen as the end of the New Argentine rock period, and the beginning of the suburban rock dominance of the late 1990s and early 2000s...

=== The Return (2014) ===
In late 2013 rumors began circulating online about Los Brujos´s reunion. A large group of fans were clamoring for the return of the band for nearly two decades and finally their wishes were fulfilled. On April 7, 2014 Los Brujos released a new single called "Beat Hit" and announced the release of their new album (Despierta Cronopio) and tour dates. This way, they begin to write a new chapter in the Argentinean sonic psychedelic rock scene.

Ricky Rúa, singer and performer of Los Brujos, died of terminal cancer in 2016.

== Discography ==
- 1991 - Fin de Semana Salvaje
- 1993 - San Cipriano
- 1995 - Guerra de Nervios
- 2015 - Pong!
- 2017 - Brujotecnia
