= Jessico =

2001 album by Babasónicos

Studio album by Babasónicos
- Released: 25 July 2001
- Genre: Rock, alternative rock
- Label: Pop Art

Babasónicos chronology
Vedette (2000)	Jessico (2001)	Jessico Dance Mix (2002)

Professional ratings
Review scores
Source	Rating
Allmusic	link

Jessico is the sixth album by Argentine rock group Babasónicos.

Jessico was critically acclaimed by the media and journalists, most of which considered it the band's best work. In 2007, the Argentine edition of Rolling Stone ranked it 16 on its list of "The 100 Greatest Albums of National Rock".

== Track listing ==
1. "Los Calientes" (The Horny Ones)
2. "Fizz"
3. "Deléctrico" (Delectric)
4. "Soy Rock" (I'm Rock)
5. "Pendejo" (Dumbass)
6. "El Loco" (The Madman)
7. "La Fox"
8. "Tóxica" (Toxic)
9. "Yoli"
10. "Rubí" (Ruby)
11. "Camarín" (Dressing Room)
12. "Atomicum"

== Singles ==
1. "Deléctrico"
2. "El Loco"
3. "Fizz"
4. "Los Calientes"
5. "Rubí"

== Sales ==
Region	Certification	Certified units/sales
Argentina	—	18,000
Mexico	—	5,000
