= Prográmaton =

Studio album by Zoé
- Released: October 29, 2013
- Recorded: January 2012 – June 2013
- Genre: Alternative rock
- Length: 46:00 minutes
- Labels: EMI; Universal
- Producer: Phil Vinall

Zoé chronology
MTV Unplugged/Música de fondo (2011)	Prográmaton (2013)	81114 (2015)

Prográmaton is the fifth studio album by the Mexican alternative rock band Zoé. It was released in October 2013 under EMI and Universal Music México, and was produced by Phil Vinall. A few days before the release of the album on the official website of Zoé were uploaded short of the songs which were unlocked by tweeting a hashtag of the name of the song. His first single was "10 A.M", which included a video. "Arrullo de Estrellas" was the second single and also consists of a video, and the third single was "Fin de Semana".

In 2015, the band re-released the album with additional tracks, as Prográmaton Revisitado Vol. 1.

According to the online archive Setlist.fm, the most often-performed songs from Prográmaton are "10 A.M.", "Arrullo de Estrellas", and "Fin de Semana".

== Track listing ==
All tracks are written by Zoé.

Prográmaton (Estándar)
No.	Title	Length
1.	"10 A.M."	3:29
2.	"Cámara Lenta" ("Slow Motion")	5:00
3.	"Dos Mil Trece" ("Two Thousand and Thirteen")	4:30
4.	"Fin de Semana" ("Weekend")	3:11
5.	"Arrullo de Estrellas" ("Lullaby of Stars")	4:12
6.	"Ciudades Invisibles" ("Invisible Cities")	4:09
7.	"Panoramas"	3:41
8.	"Game Over Shanghai" (Liu Yang River)	5:05
9.	"Andrómeda"	3:44
10.	"Sedantes" ("Sedatives")	5:21
11.	"Altamar" ("High Seas")	3:38
Total length:		46:05

Bonus Track
No.	Title	Length
12.	"S.O.S."	5:01
13.	"Arrullo de Estrellas" (Sánchez Dub Rework)	7:06
Total length:		58:12

== Certifications ==
Region	Certification	Certified units/sales
Mexico (AMPROFON)	3× Platinum+Gold	210,000^{‡}
^{‡} Sales+streaming figures based on certification alone.
