= Siddhartha (musician) =

Mexican musician

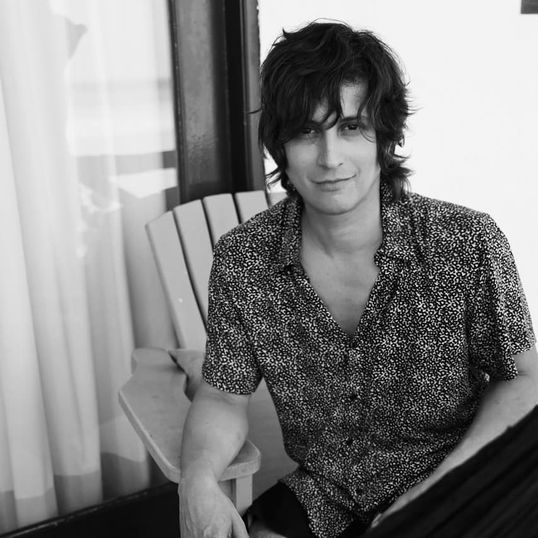

Background information
- Born: Jorge Siddhartha González Ibarra; Guadalajara, Jalisco, Mexico
- Genres: Rock
- Occupation: Musician
- Instruments: Vocals; guitar; drums
- Years active: 2005–present

Jorge Siddhartha González Ibarra (Guadalajara, Jalisco), known professionally as Siddhartha, is a Mexican rock musician.

Siddhartha was the drummer of the Mexican rock band Zoé from 2005 to 2006. He has released six solo albums: Why You? (2008), which was nominated for Best Rock Solo Vocal Album at the 9th Annual Latin Grammy Awards; Náufrago (2011); El vuelo del pez (2014); Únicos (2016); Memoria Futuro (2019), which was nominated for Best Alternative Music Album at the 15th Annual Latin Grammy Awards; and 00:00 (2022).

== History ==
Siddhartha became one of the most promising artists in Mexico´s music scene just after releasing his first album Why You?, in 2008. The album received many accolades:

- Winner at the Indie-o Music Awards for the category of Best Solo Artist Album.
- Nominated for the Best Rock Solo Vocal Album Latin Grammy.
- Named one of the best productions of the year by music magazines including Warp, Marvin, Rolling Stone, Sonika and Circulo Mixup.
- The videos Sacúdeme, Control, Volver a Ver and Colecciono Planetas got into the top lists within T.V. channels such as MTV, Telehit, Ritmoson Latino and Exa TV.
- Siddhartha was also invited to include his song "Nube" within the soundtrack of the movie El Brindis. He was also invited to add "Control" to another movie's soundtrack: Bajo la Sal.
- Also, he was invited to add his track "En Silencio" within the mixed disc of the Latin Alternative Music Conference (edited by National Records) when celebrating its 10 years within the City of New York.
- As well invited to participate in the tribute album for the Chilean series 31 Minutes with the song "Mi castillo de Blanca Arena" as the single for this album. Café Tacuba, Ximena Sariñana, Belanova, Natalia Lafourcade, Los Bunkers and other artists contributed within this project.
- The video "Sacúdeme" was nominated by the Festival Pantalla de Cristal within the categories of Best Post-Production, Best Animation and was the winner of the Best Painting award.
- "Los Felices" formed part of "Te presento a Laura"´s soundtrack, a movie starring Martha Higareda and Kuno Becker.

== Náufrago ==
Siddhartha began his tour "Náufrago" just after the release of the homonym album, successfully presenting at every city, fulfilling scenarios and having tickets sold out. He played at plenty of places such as the Lunario of the Auditorio Nacional and the forum Voila Antara.

Some Mexican cities including Puebla, Querétaro, Guadalajara, Morelia, León, Aguascalientes, San Luis Potosí, Oaxaca, Toluca, Xalapa, Pachuca, Tuxtla, San Cristobal de las Casas, Monterrey, Tijuana were integrated to this tour, also a concert at Los Angeles was included.

Siddhartha played at the Vive Latino 2012 festival (Mexico´s City).

The album Náufrago was produced by Siddhartha and Aldo Muñoz, mastered at The Exchange Studios (UK) by Mike Mars, helped by Marcelo Salazar and Erick Rangel to do the co-production of this album (Rangel integrates part of the band when it is playing live; Salazar used to play the guitar previously).

Current musicians:

- Erick Rangel - Synth and keyboards
- Alejandro Chubaka - Bass guitar
- Siddartha - Guitar and voice
- Rul Velázquez - Guitar
- Orlando Farías - Drums

Former musicians:

- Shaboomy – Guitar
- Marcelo Salazar - Guitar
- Santiago Bedoya - Drums
- Axcel Lir - Bass guitar

== Discography ==
Studio albums

- Why You? (2008)
- Náufrago (2011)
- El Vuelo del Pez (2014)
- Únicos (2016)
- Al Aire (2018)
- Memoria Futuro (2020)
- 00:00 (2022)

Live albums

- Al Aire (2018)

EPs

- Miel de Azar (2024)
