= Infame (album) =

2003 album by Babasónicos

Studio album by Babasónicos
- Released: 19 October 2003
- Recorded: 2003
- Genre: Surf rock, electropop
- Length: 44:01
- Label: PopArt Music
- Producer: Andrew Weiss

Babasónicos chronology
Jessico Megamix (2002)	Infame (2003)	Anoche (2005)

Professional ratings
Review scores
Source	Rating
Allmusic	4.5/5 stars

Infame (Infamous) is the seventh album by Argentine rock group Babasónicos.

== Track listing ==
1. "Irresponsables" (Irresponsible Ones) - 2:36
2. "Risa" (Laughter) - 3:07
3. "Pistero" (Song Jockey) - 2:58
4. "Estertor" (Death Rattle) - 3:03
5. "Putita" (Little Whore) - 3:45
6. "Suturno" (Yourturn) - 3:53
7. "Mareo" (Dizziness) - 3:32
8. "Sin Mi Diablo" (Without My Devil) - 3:01
9. "Curtis" - 3:27
10. "Y Qué" (So What) - 3:07
11. "La Puntita" (The Tip) - 3:13
12. "Fan de Scorpions" (Scorpions Fan) - 2:15
13. "Gratis" (Free) - 3:05
14. "Once" - 2:33

== Singles ==
1. "Irresponsables"
2. "Putita"
3. "Risa"
4. "Y Qué"

== Charts ==
Chart performance for Infame
Chart (2025)	Peak position
Argentine Albums (CAPIF)	1

== Certifications ==
Region	Certification	Certified units/sales
Argentina (CAPIF)	Platinum	40,000^{^}
^{^} Shipments figures based on certification alone.
