= Memo Rex Commander y el Corazón Atómico de la Vía Láctea =

Studio album by Zoé
- Released: (Mexico) July 12, 2006
- Genre: Alternative rock Rock en español Psychedelic rock
- Label: Noiselab, EMI
- Producer: Phil Vinall, Mauricio Garza

Zoé chronology
Rocanlover (2003)	Memo Rex Commander y el Corazón Atómico de la Vía Láctea (2006)	Reptilectric (2008)

Singles from Memo Rex Commander y el Corazón Atómico de la Vía Láctea
- 1. ""Vía Láctea"" Released: 2006; 2. ""No Me Destruyas"" Released: November 2006; 3. ""Paula"" Released: July 2007

Memo Rex Commander y el Corazón Atómico de la Vía Láctea (Memo Rex Commander and the Atomic Heart of the Milky Way) is the third studio album by Mexican rock band Zoé. The record shows a noticeable synthpop influence.

It debuted at #1 in Mexican store sales, which was a first-time achievement for the band. The album was a success and received Gold certification for more than 60,000 units sold within four weeks of its release, and received favorable reviews by professional press.

The first single off the album was "Vía Láctea", which charted well on Latin music video channels. The second single "No Me Destruyas" was released in November 2006, while "Paula" was released in July 2007. This album was eventually certified platinum for over 80,000 copies sold in Mexico alone.

"Vía Láctea" and "No Me Destruyas" continue to be extremely popular with the band's fans, and are still among the most frequently played songs at Zoé shows, including the 2018 US tour.

== Track listing ==
No.	Title	Length
1.	"Memo Rex"	3:45
2.	"Vía Láctea" ("Milky Way")	3:45
3.	"Vinyl"	4:38
4.	"No Me Destruyas" ("Don't Destroy Me")	3:45
5.	"Corazón Atómico" ("Atomic Heart")	3:52
6.	"Mrs. Nitro"	2:54
7.	"Nunca" ("Never")	5:22
8.	"The Room"	5:20
9.	"Paula"	4:13
10.	"Human Space Volt"	3:48
11.	"Triste Sister" ("Sad Sister")	3:43
12.	"Side Effects"	4:33
13.	"Paz" ("Peace")	4:53

The special edition includes an extra track, "Everything Goes", and a second DVD containing the video for "No me Destruyas" and three live videos (Corazón Atómico, Vinyl and Human Space Volt) and also includes a video recording of "Paula".

== Sales and certifications ==
Region	Certification	Certified units/sales
Mexico (AMPROFON)	Platinum	100,000^{^}
^{^} Shipments figures based on certification alone.
