= Reptilectric =

Studio album by Zoé
- Released: October 2008
- Recorded: January 2008
- Genre: Alternative rock
- Length: 42.2 minutes
- Label: EMI
- Producer: Phil Vinall

Zoé chronology
| Memo Rex Commander y el Corazón Atómico de la Vía Láctea (2006) | Reptilectric (2008) | MTV Unplugged/Música de Fondo (2011) |

Singles from Reptilectric
- 1. "Reptilectric" Released: October 2, 2008; 2. "Nada" Released: February 6, 2009; 3. "Poli" Released: July 4, 2009

Professional ratings
Review scores
| Source | Rating |
|---|---|
| Allmusic.com | 4/5 stars |

Reptilectric is the fourth studio album by Mexican rock band Zoé, released in October 2008 through EMI Music. It was produced by Phil Vinall, who had previously worked with Radiohead and Placebo. The album debuted at number one on the Mexican sales charts and became Zoé's second platinum album for its 80,000 copies sold in Mexico alone. On November 25, 2009, Zoé received three Premios OYE! for Album, Group, and Video of Year.

== Track listing ==
| No. | Title | Length |
|---|---|---|
| 1. | "Reptilectric" | 3:52 |
| 2. | "Nada" ("Nothing") | 5:34 |
| 3. | "Sombras" ("Shadows") | 4:12 |
| 4. | "No Hay Dolor" ("There's No Pain") | 3:12 |
| 5. | "Poli" | 3:20 |
| 6. | "Resiste" ("Hold On") | 3:00 |
| 7. | "Neandertal" ("Neanderthal") | 3:44 |
| 8. | "Fantasma" ("Ghost") | 4:22 |
| 9. | "Luna" ("Moon") | 4:41 |
| 10. | "Últimos Días" ("Last Days") | 3:52 |
| 11. | "Babilonia" ("Babylonia") | 3:29 |

== Singles ==
The first single of the album was Reptilectric, which had its own music video.

In February 2009, a poll was held in order to decide which song would be the album's second single. "Nada" turned out to be the winner, and was offered as a free download via iTunes, becoming the single of the week for the week of May 7, 2008. An accompanying music video was released in April 2009.

Similarly, a second poll was held in order to pick the album's third single, but before the winner had been announced, Larregui posted in the band's website some messages that suggested that the vídeo for the single had already been shot. On August 31, "Poli" was released by Zoé as the third single off the album, via Myspace.

== Certifications ==
| Region | Certification | Certified units/sales |
|---|---|---|
| Mexico (AMPROFON) | 2× Platinum | 160,000^{‡} |
^{‡} Sales+streaming figures based on certification alone.
