= Trance Zomba =

1994 album by Babasónicos

Studio album by Babasónicos
- Released: 1994
- Recorded: 1994 in Estudio Móvil Gibraltar, Buenos Aires
- Genre: Stoner rock
- Label: Sony Music/Epic

Babasónicos chronology
Pasto (1992)	Trance Zomba (1994)	Dopádromo (1996)

Trance Zomba is the second album by Argentine rock group Babasónicos.

== Track listing ==
1. "Desarmate" (Disarm Yourself)
2. "Malón" (Indian Raid)
3. "Montañas de Agua" (Mountains of Water)
4. "Coralcaraza"
5. "Ascendiendo" (Ascending)
6. "Patinador Sagrado" (Holy Roller)
7. "Koyote"
8. "Poder Ñandú" (Rhea Power)
9. "Árbol Palmera" (Palm Tree)
10. "Sheeba Baby"
11. "Misericordia" (Mercy)
12. "Posesión del Tercer Tipo" (Possession of the Third Kind)
