= Pasto (album) =

1992 album by Babasónicos

Studio album by Babasónicos
- Released: 1992
- Recorded: 1992, Estudios Aguilar, Buenos Aires
- Genre: Alternative Rock
- Label: Sony Music

Babasónicos chronology
Pasto (1992)	Trance Zomba (1994)

Pasto (Grass) is the debut album by Argentine rock group Babasónicos. It was recorded and released in 1992 and has guest appearances by Gustavo Cerati, Daniel Melero and members of other groups which, at the time, were also part of the New Argentinian Rock (or Sonic rock) movement, such as Martes Menta and Juana la Loca. The only single released from Pasto was "D-Generación", which was a minor radio hit at the time and made the upcoming band known to Argentinian listeners. The album has an eclectic style, with many of the tracks being short skits (such as "41" de Ocio", which consists of the band chatting between songs; or "Mutha Fucka", a track which seems to have been made by cutting and pasting together various audio samples taken from TV). It also has numerous references to cannabis culture, starting with the album name and various track names which refer to botany.

== Track listing ==
1. "Intro"
2. "D-Generación" (D-Generation)
3. "Tripeando" (Tripping)
4. "41" de Ocio" (41" of Leisure)
5. "Sobre la Hierba" (On the Herb)
6. "Chicos en el Pasto" (Kids on the Grass)
7. "Canción de la Bandera" (Flag Song)
8. "La Era del Amor-Parte I" (The Love Age-Part I)
9. "Natural"
10. "Mutha Fucka"
11. "Somos la Pelota" (We Are the Ball)
12. "Guarda D.P.!" (Watch Out D.P.!)
13. "Bien" (Fine)
14. "Listo" (Ready)
15. "Indios" (Indians)
16. "Fiebre Roller" (Roller Fever)
17. "Sol Naranja" (Orange Sun)
18. "Umito"
19. "Margaritas" (Daisies)
20. "D-Generación (Trash Mix)"
