= Dopádromo =

1996 album by Babasónicos

Studio album by Babasónicos
- Released: 1996
- Recorded: 1996
- Genre: Rock
- Label: Sony Music
- Producer: Andrew Weiss

Babasónicos chronology
Trance Zomba (1994)	Dopádromo (1996)	Babasónica (1997)

Dopádromo (Drug-O-Rama) is the third album by Argentine rock group Babasónicos.

== Track listing ==
1. "Zumba" (Hum)
2. "El Médium" (The Medium)
3. "Cybernecia" (Cyberfool)
4. "Safari Vixen"
5. "¡Viva Satana!" (Long Live Satana!)
6. "Perfume Casino" (Casino Perfume)
7. "Calmática"
8. "Coyarama"
9. "Su Majestad" (Your Majesty)
10. "Pesadilla Biónica del Perro Biónico" (Bionic Nightmare of the Bionic Dog)
11. "Gronchótica"
12. "Su Ciervo" (Her Deer)
