= Romantisísmico =

2013 album by Babasónicos

Studio album by Babasónicos
- Released: September 20, 2013
- Recorded: 2013
- Genre: Alternative rock
- Label: Sony Music Latin
- Producer: Andrew Weiss

Babasónicos chronology
A Propósito (2011)	Romantisísmico (2013)	Discutible (2018)

Romantisísmico (Romanticeismic) is the eleventh studio album by Argentine rock band Babasónicos, released in September 2013.

== Track listing ==
1. "La lanza" [The spear] (A.Rodríguez, D.Rodríguez)
2. "Aduana de palabras" [Words Customs] (A.Rodríguez, D.Rodríguez)
3. "El baile del Odín" [The dance of Odin] (A.Rodríguez, D.Rodríguez, D.Tuñón, M.Dominguez)
4. "Run Run" (A.Rodríguez, D.Rodríguez, D.Tuñón)
5. "Los Burócratas del Amor" [The Bureaucrats of Love] (A.Rodríguez, M.Dominguez)
6. "Negrita" [Bold] (A.Rodríguez, D.Rodríguez, D.Tuñón)
7. "Uso" [Use] (A.Rodríguez, D.Rodríguez, D.Tuñón)
8. "Humo" [Smoke] (A.Rodríguez, M.Dominguez)
9. "Casi" [Nearly] (A.Rodríguez, M.Dominguez)
10. "Uno tres dos" [One three two] (A.Rodríguez, M.Dominguez)
11. "Paisano" (A.Rodríguez, D.Rodríguez)
12. "Celofán" [Cellophane] (A.Rodríguez, D.Rodríguez)

== Singles ==
1. "La lanza"
2. "Los Burócratas del Amor"
3. "Aduana de palabras"
