= Vera Fogwill =

Argentine actress, director, and screenplay writer

Vera Fogwill (Spanish pronunciation: [ˈbeɾa ˈfoɣβil]; born 28 November 1972 in Buenos Aires) is an Argentine film and television actress, film director, and screenplay writer, active in the cinema of Argentina.

She is the daughter of Rodolfo Enrique Fogwill.

Her first film as a director is "Las mantenidas sin sueños" ("Kept and Dreamless") in which Fogwill also plays the leading role, of a drug-addicted mother.

== Filmography ==
Acting

- ¿Quién es Alejandro Chomski? (corto/short subject), subject of an interview
- El Censor (1995) aka The Eyes of the Scissors
- Evita (1996)
- Buenos Aires Vice Versa (1996), Daniela
- Plaza de almas (1997)
- El Viento se llevó lo qué (1998) aka Wind with the Gone, Soledad
- Las Mantenidas Sin Sueños (2005), Florencia
- Chile 672 (2006), nurse

Directing

- Las Mantenidas Sin Sueños (2005)

Screenwriter

- Horizontal/Vertical (2008)
- Las Mantenidas Sin Sueños (2005)

== Television ==
- Canto rodado (escuela de arte) (1993) TV Series
- Vulnerables (1999) TV Series
- Mujeres Asesinas (2006) TV Series
