= Babasónica =

1997 album by Babasónicos

Studio album by Babasónicos
- Released: August 6, 1997
- Recorded: 1997 in Network Studios, New York City
- Genre: Stoner rock, alternative rock, heavy psych, psychedelic folk
- Label: Sony Music
- Producer: Andrew Weiss

Babasónicos chronology
Dopádromo (1996)	Babasónica (1997)	Vórtice Marxista (1998)

Babasónica is the fourth album by Argentine rock group Babasónicos. Considered their darkest effort to date, it was primarily influenced by stoner rock music, while also retaining a softer acoustic side. Some tracks even include both stylistic approaches at once making for interesting contrast.

Lyrically, the album deals with the concepts of satanism; which the band has declared that this approach isn't meant to be taken at face value, but as homage to classic metal, and as an attack on common Western ways of thinking, such as religion.

== Track listing ==
1. "Egocripta" (Egocrypt)
2. "Seis Vírgenes Descalzas" (Six Barefoot Virgins)
3. "Demonomanía" (Demon-O-Mania)
4. "Sharon Tate"
5. "Sátiro" (Satyr)
6. "Parafinada" (Paraffined)
7. "Delnitro"
8. "Esther Narcótica" (Narcotic Esther)
9. "Calmado, Matamos al Venado" (Relax, We Killed the Deer)
10. "Convoy"
11. "Pasta de Hablar" (wordplay between Talking Pasta and Stop Talking)
12. "Passionale"
13. "El Adversario" (The Adversary)
