= Mucho =

2008 album by Babasónicos

Studio album by Babasónicos
- Released: 5 May 2008
- Genre: Rock
- Label: Universal Music

Babasónicos chronology
Las Mantenidas Sin Sueños (2007)	Mucho (2008)	Mucho + (2009)

Professional ratings
Review scores
Source	Rating
Allmusic	4.5/5 stars
Billboard	(?)

Mucho (A lot) is the 9th album by Argentine rock group Babasónicos. It was released on CD in 2008. The first single for the album is "Pijamas", and peaked 1 in Argentina. The second single was released in September.

== Track listing ==
1. "Yo Anuncio" (I Announce)
2. "Pijamas" (Pajamas)
3. "Escamas" (Scales)
4. "Cuello Rojo" (Redneck)
5. "Cómo Eran Las Cosas" (How Things Were)
6. "Microdancing"
7. "Las Demás" (The Others)
8. "Estoy Rabioso" (I'm Angry)
9. "Nosotros" (Us)
10. "El Ídolo" (The Idol)

== Singles ==
1. "Pijamas" (#1 Argentina)
2. "Microdancing" (#1 Argentina)
3. "Las Demás" (#19 Argentina)
4. "Escamas"
5. "Nosotros"
6. "El Ídolo"
