= Anoche =

2005 studio album by Babasónicos

Studio album by Babasónicos
- Released: 19 October 2005
- Recorded: Estudios Panda (Buenos Aires)
- Genre: Rock
- Length: 36:20
- Label: Universal Music
- Producer: Andrew Weiss

Babasónicos chronology
Infame (2003)	Anoche (2005)	Mezclas Infame (2005)

Professional ratings
Review scores
Source	Rating
Allmusic	4/5 stars

Anoche (transl. "Last Night") is the eighth studio album by Argentine rock band Babasónicos. The album was composed in Córdoba in March 2005, and then recorded and produced by Andrew Weiss, as well as by the band themselves, in May 2005.

== Track listing ==
1. "Así se habla" (That's What I'm Talking About) – 2:01
2. "Carismático" (Charismatic) – 2:36
3. "Yegua" (Mare) – 2:29
4. "Un flash" (A Flash) – 2:27
5. "Pobre duende" (Poor Goblin) – 1:23
6. "Solita" (Alone - famine -) – 2:31
7. "Puesto" (High) – 3:26
8. "Falsario" (Fakeness) – 2:39
9. "Capricho" (Whim) – 2:38
10. "El colmo" (The Last Straw) – 2:40
11. "Ciegos por el diezmo" (Blinded by the Tithe) – 2:57
12. "Exámenes" (Exams) – 3:25
13. "Muñeco" (Doll) – 2:25
14. "Luces" (Lights) – 2:40

== Singles ==
1. "Carismático"
2. "Yegua"
3. "El Colmo"
4. "Capricho"
5. "Puesto"

== Sales and certifications ==
Region	Certification	Certified units/sales
Argentina (CAPIF)	Platinum	40,000^{^}
^{^} Shipments figures based on certification alone.

== Personnel ==
=== Babasónicos ===
- Adrián Dárgelos – vocals
- Diego Castellano – drums, percussion
- Mariano Roger – guitars, backing vocals
- Diego Rodríguez – guitars, backing vocals
- Gabriel Manelli – bass
- Diego Tuñón – keyboards, samples, backing vocals

=== Additional musicians ===
- Carca (on the track "Falsario")
