= Hello Seahorse! =

Mexican rock band

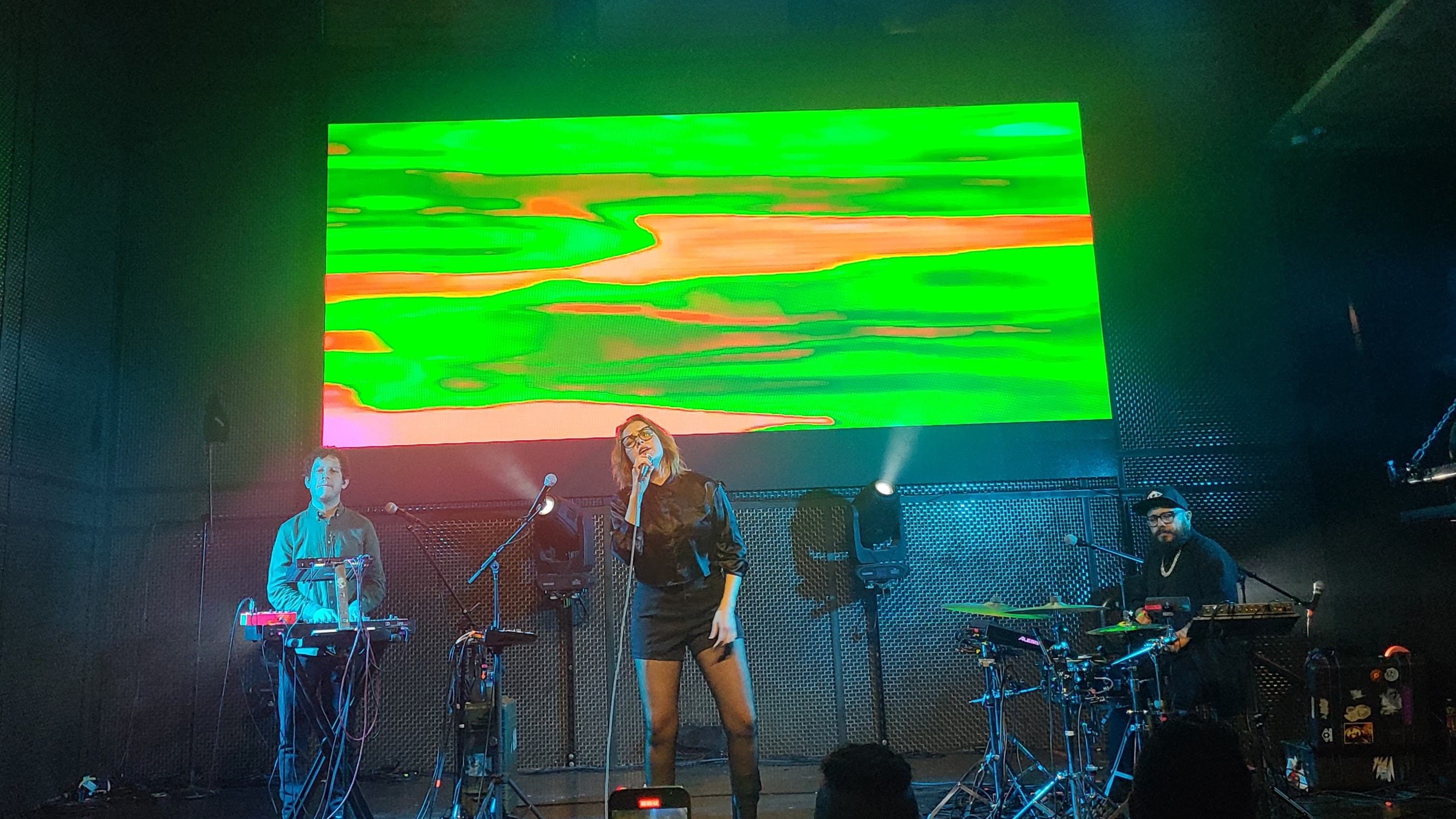

Background information
- Origin: Mexico City, Mexico
- Genres: Indie rock, alternative rock, shoegaze, dream pop
- Years active: 2005–present
- Labels: Mun Records, EMI, Nacional Records, Magic Marker
- Members: Fernando Burgos; Bonnz! (Gabriel G. De León); Denise Gutiérrez (Lo Blondo)
- Past members: Julio Muñoz; Joe (José Borunda); Reez (Hector Ruiz)
- Website: helloseahorse.com

Hello Seahorse! is a Mexican alternative rock band formed in 2005 in Mexico City. The band gained quick recognition as one of the leading acts in Mexican alternative and indie rock, placing their first commercial single "Bestia" on regular radio airplay by November 2008.

Early releases such as the EP Hoy a las Ocho featured lyrics in both English and Spanish, though later tracks are solely in the latter; these however deal about nonsense or surrealistic themes.

The band's second album Bestia was released on May 19, 2009. The track "Bestia" from that album won the "song of the year" award at Mexico's 2009 "Indie-O Music Awards" ceremony. At the 2009 MTV Video Music Awards Latinoamérica, they were nominated for and won the "La Zona" award. Also in 2009, they were nominated for best alternative song at the Latin Grammy Awards, but they lost to Calle 13, and the next year they were nominated in the same category with the song Criminal.

Hello Seahorse! has shared the stage with bands such as Beastie Boys, Jarvis Cocker, Clinic and The Killers.

== Members ==
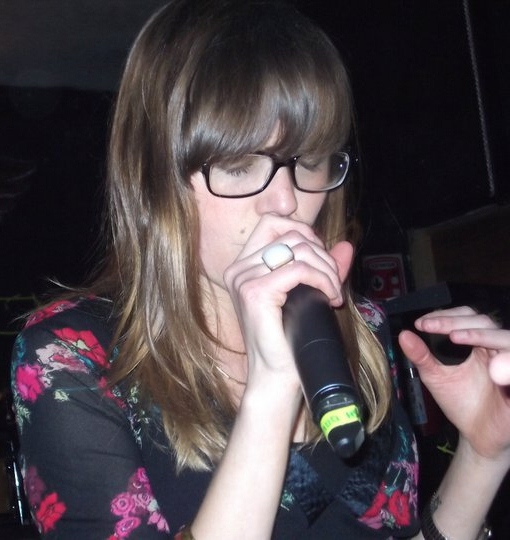
Denise Gutiérrez, lead vocals; she is a soprano singer.

Hello Seahorse's current line-up comprises a female vocalist/lyricist, and male keyboardist and drummer, with no guitarist. The band started as a trio, then became a quartet, and a trio again by 2009:

- Denise Gutiérrez (Lo Blondo) - lead vocals, lyrics. Gutierrez was born in Van Nuys, California, but raised in Mexico City. She met keyboardist Oro de Neta and drummer Bonnz via a MySpace ad for a singer.
- Oro de Neta - (Fernando Burgos, born May 1984) piano, keyboards, bass, synth
- Bonnz! - (Gabriel G. De León, previously known as Bonno, born November 1984) drums, guitar
- Joe - (José Borunda) guitar, bass, piano

=== Former member ===
- Julio Muñoz (born 1982) guitar. - He played guitar in the emo/math rock band No Somos Marineros.

== Discography ==
Studio albums

- ...and the Jellyfish Parade (2007)
- Hoy a las Ocho (2007) was released on Magic Marker records two years later in the US.
- Bestia (2009)
- Lejos. No Tan Lejos (2010)
- Arunima (2012)
- Entretanto [EP] (2016)
- Disco Estimulante (2020)
- Hiper (2023)

Live albums

- Hello Seahorse! 10 Años (En Vivo) (2018)

== Videos ==
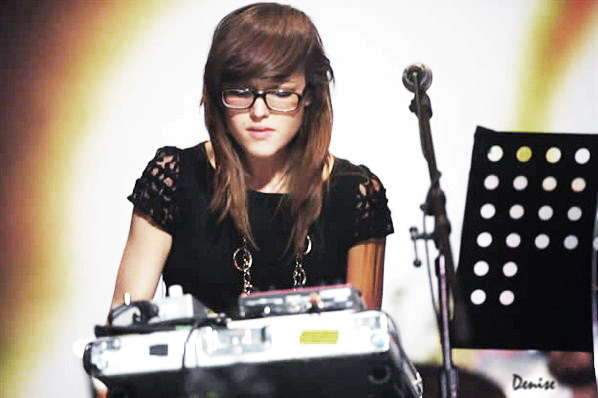
Denise Gutiérrez participated in the celebrations of the centenary composer Consuelo Velázquez.

...and the Jellyfish Parade

- "Squarehead"

Hoy a las Ocho

- "Won't Say Anything"

Bestia

- "Bestia" ("Beast")
- "Después" ("After")
- "Criminal"

Lejos. No Tan Lejos

- "Casa Vacía" ("Empty House")
- "Un Año Quebrado" ("A Broken Year")
- "Me Has Olvidado" ("You Have Forgotten Me")
- "Velo De Novia" ("Veil")

Arunima

- "Para Mi" ("For Me")
- "La Flotadera" ("The Floatering")
- "No Es Que No Te Quiera" ("It's Not That I Don't Love You")
- "El Artista" ("The Artist")

Entretanto

- "Animal"
- "Me He Convertido" ("I've Become")
- "Nada Extraordinario ft. Gil Cerezo" ("Nothing Extraordinary")
- "Algún Día (Alicia)" ("Someday (Alicia)")
