= Babasónicos =

Argentine rock band

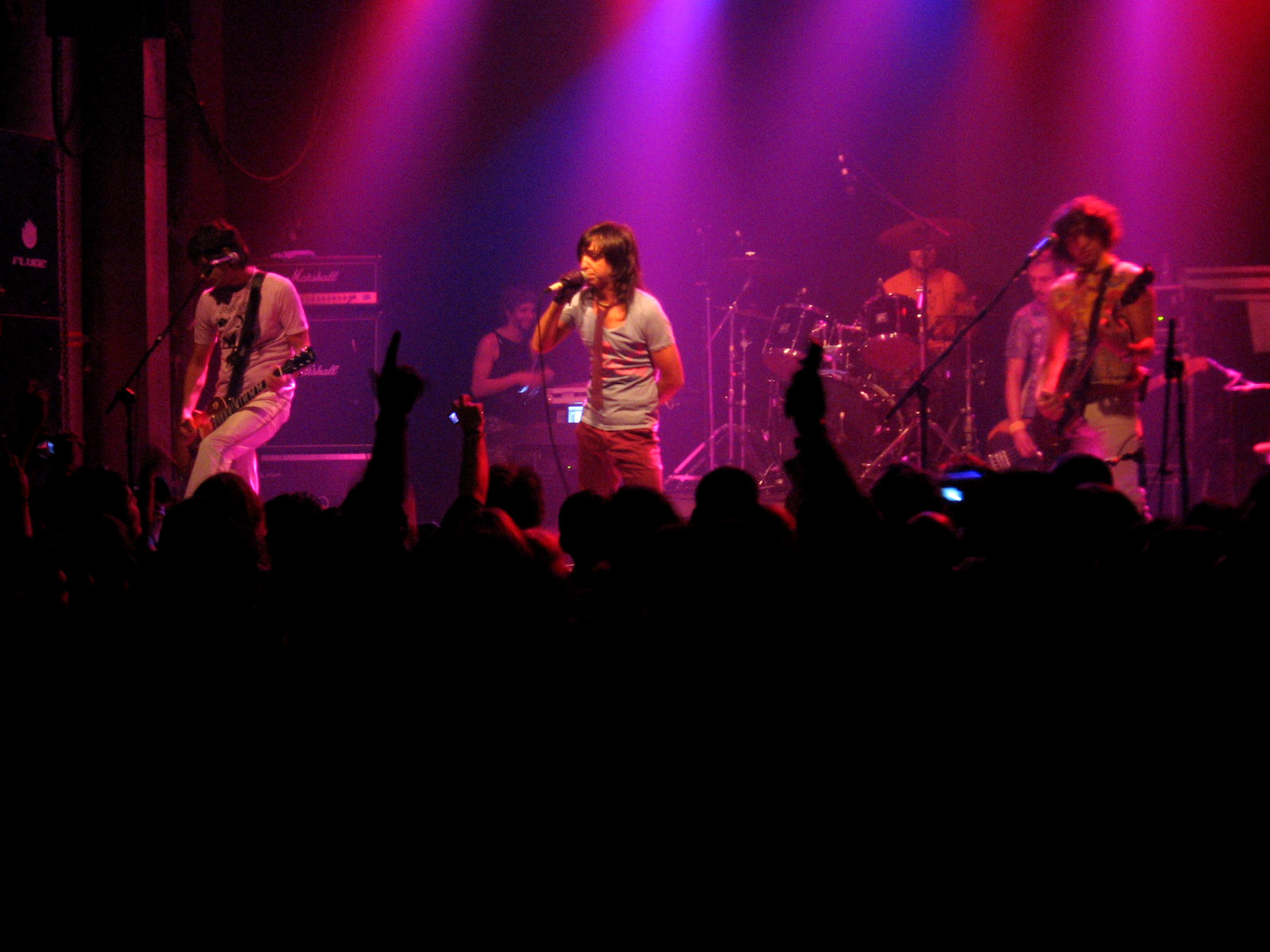

Background information
- Origin: Lanús, Buenos Aires, Argentina
- Genres: Alternative rock; pop rock; alternative dance; psychedelic pop; neo-psychedelia; experimental rock
- Years active: 1991–present
- Labels: Sony; Bultaco; Pop Art; Universal
- Members: Adrián "Dárgelos" Rodríguez; Diego "Uma" Rodríguez; Diego "Uma-T" Tuñón; Diego "Panza" Castellano; Mariano "Roger" Domínguez
- Past members: Walter "DJ Peggyn" Kebleris; Gabriel "Gabo" Manelli †
- Website: www.babasonicos.com

Babasónicos is an Argentine rock band, formed in the early 1990s along with others such as Peligrosos Gorriones and Los Brujos. After emerging in the wave of Argentine New Rock bands of the late 1980s and early 1990s, Babasonicos became one of the banner groups of the "sonic" underground rock movement in Argentina in the late 1990s.

The band name refers partly to Sai Baba, the Indian guru, and partly to a local toy gun called "La Pistola Sónica" (The Sonic Pistol).

The lead singer Adrián "Dárgelos" Rodríguez and the keyboardist Diego "Uma-T" Tuñón initially decided to create a new style, which would not follow the established Argentine music. The other official band members are: Diego "Uma" Rodríguez (guitarist and lead singer), Diego "Panza" Castellano (drummer), Mariano "Roger" Domínguez (guitarist), and Gabriel "Gabo" Manelli (bassist, deceased).

For their second album, Trance Zomba (1994), they incorporated a guest DJ, "DJ Peggyn" who would eventually remain as a band member until after releasing Miami (1999). This same year the band saw the departure of their longtime manager Cosme.

In 1999, they collaborated with Ian Brown on a song that bears their name on his album Golden Greats.

In 2001, the band released Jessico, their most commercially successful and critically acclaimed album up to that point, reaching a broad mainstream audience with singles like "Los Calientes", "El Loco" and "Deléctrico".

The following records, Infame (2003), Anoche (2005) and Mucho (2008) continued with a streak of critical praise and commercial success, each one being selected by several media outlets as one of the best Argentine albums of their respective years.

Babasonicos also composed the soundtrack for Vera Fogwill's movie Las Mantenidas Sin Sueños (Kept and Dreamless), which was released in 2007. The album was composed in 2003.

On January 12, 2008, the band posted an entry on their official site in which they informed that their longtime bassist, Gabriel Manelli had died as a result of Hodgkin's disease, which he had been suffering since the tour supporting the album Infame. Multi-instrumentalist and long-time friend Carca joined the group in replace of Manelli in their 2011 album A Propósito.

They released their latest album Cuerpos Vol. 1 in 2025.

== Discography ==
Studio albums

- Pasto (1992)
- Trance Zomba (1994)
- Dopádromo (1996)
- Babasónica (1997)
- Miami (1999)
- Jessico (2001)
- Infame (2003)
- Anoche (2005)
- Mucho (2008)
- A propósito (2011)
- Romantisísmico (2013)
- Discutible (2018)
- Trinchera (2022)
- Cuerpos Vol. 1 (2025)

== Awards and nominations ==
Award	Year	Category	Nominated work	Result	Ref.
Latin Grammy Awards	2002	Best Rock Album by a Duo or Group with Vocal	Jessico	Nominated	
Latin Grammy Awards	2004	Best Alternative Music Album	Infame	Nominated	
Latin Grammy Awards	2006	Best Alternative Music Album	Anoche	Nominated	
Latin Grammy Awards	2008	Best Alternative Music Album	Mucho	Nominated	
Latin Grammy Awards	2008	Best Short Form Music Video	"Pijamas"	Nominated	
Latin Grammy Awards	2009	Best Short Form Music Video	"Las Demás"	Nominated	
Latin Grammy Awards	2009	Best Alternative Music Album	Mucho +	Nominated	
Latin Grammy Awards	2014	Best Alternative Music Album	Romantisísmico	Won	
Latin Grammy Awards	2014	Best Alternative Song	"La Lanza"	Nominated	
Latin Grammy Awards	2014	Best Short Form Music Video	"La Lanza"	Nominated	
Latin Grammy Awards	2016	Best Long Form Music Video	Desde Adentro - Impuesto de Fé (En Vivo)	Nominated	
Latin Grammy Awards	2019	Best Alternative Music Album	Discutible	Nominated	
Latin Grammy Awards	2019	Best Alternative Song	"La Pregunta"	Nominated	
Latin Grammy Awards	2022	Best Pop/Rock Album	Trinchera	Nominated	
Latin Grammy Awards	2022	Best Pop/Rock Song	"Bye Bye"	Nominated	
Latin Grammy Awards	2023	Best Pop/Rock Album	Trinchera Avanzada	Nominated	
Los Premios MTV Latinoamérica	2002	Best Group or Duet	Babasónicos	Nominated	
Los Premios MTV Latinoamérica	2002	Best Rock Artist	Babasónicos	Nominated	
Los Premios MTV Latinoamérica	2002	Best Artist — Southeast	Babasónicos	Nominated	
Los Premios MTV Latinoamérica	2003	Best Group or Duet	Babasónicos	Nominated	
Los Premios MTV Latinoamérica	2003	Best Artist - Argentina	Babasónicos	Nominated	
Los Premios MTV Latinoamérica	2004	Video of the Year	"Putita"	Nominated	
Los Premios MTV Latinoamérica	2004	Best Group or Duet	Babasónicos	Nominated	
Los Premios MTV Latinoamérica	2004	Best Rock Artist	Babasónicos	Nominated	
Los Premios MTV Latinoamérica	2004	Best Artist - Argentina	Babasónicos	Nominated	
Los Premios MTV Latinoamérica	2005	Best Rock Artist	Babasónicos	Nominated	
Los Premios MTV Latinoamérica	2005	Best Artist - South	Babasónicos	Nominated	
Los Premios MTV Latinoamérica	2006	Best Rock Artist	Babasónicos	Nominated	
Los Premios MTV Latinoamérica	2006	Best Artist - South	Babasónicos	Nominated	
Los Premios MTV Latinoamérica	2007	Artist of the Year	Babasónicos	Nominated	
Los Premios MTV Latinoamérica	2007	Best Group or Duet	Babasónicos	Nominated	
Los Premios MTV Latinoamérica	2007	Best Rock Artist	Babasónicos	Won	
Los Premios MTV Latinoamérica	2007	Best Artist - South	Babasónicos	Nominated	
Los Premios MTV Latinoamérica	2008	Artist of the Year	Babasónicos	Nominated	
Los Premios MTV Latinoamérica	2008	Best Group or Duet	Babasónicos	Nominated	
Los Premios MTV Latinoamérica	2008	Best Rock Artist	Babasónicos	Nominated	
Los Premios MTV Latinoamérica	2008	Best Artist - South	Babasónicos	Nominated	
Los Premios MTV Latinoamérica	2008	Best Fanclub	Babasónicos	Nominated	
Los Premios MTV Latinoamérica	2008	Video of the Year	"Pijamas"	Nominated	
MTV Europe Music Awards	2012	Best Latin America South Act	Babasónicos	Nominated	
MTV Europe Music Awards	2014	Best Latin America South Act	Babasónicos	Nominated	
MTV Europe Music Awards	2016	Best Latin America South Act	Babasónicos	Nominated	
Premios Gardel	2002	Album of the Year	Jessico	Nominated	
Premios Gardel	2002	Best Rock Group Album	Jessico	Nominated	
Premios Gardel	2004	Album of the Year	Infame	Won	
Premios Gardel	2004	Golden Gardel	Infame	Won	
Premios Gardel	2004	Producer of the Year (with Andrew Weiss)	Infame	Won	
Premios Gardel	2004	Best Rock Group Album	Infame	Won	
Premios Gardel	2004	Song of the Year	"Irresponsables"	Won	
Premios Gardel	2004	Record of the Year	"Irresponsables"	Won	
Premios Gardel	2004	Best Music Video	"Irresponsables"	Won	
Premios Gardel	2006	Album of the Year	Anoche	Nominated	
Premios Gardel	2006	Record of the Year	Anoche	Nominated	
Premios Gardel	2006	Best Rock Group Album	Anoche	Won	
Premios Gardel	2006	Song of the Year	"Yegua"	Nominated	
Premios Gardel	2006	Best Music Video	"Yegua"	Nominated	
Premios Gardel	2008	Best Soundtrack	Las Mantenidas sin Sueños	Nominated	
Premios Gardel	2009	Album of the Year	Mucho	Nominated	
Premios Gardel	2009	Best Rock Group Album	Mucho	Won	
Premios Gardel	2009	Song of the Year	"Microdancing"	Nominated	
Premios Gardel	2009	Song of the Year	Best Music Video	Nominated	
Premios Gardel	2012	Album of the Year	A Proposito	Nominated	
Premios Gardel	2012	Best Rock Group Album	A Proposito	Nominated	
Premios Gardel	2012	Best Music Video	"Muñeco de Haití"	Nominated	
Premios Gardel	2013	Best Catalog Collection Album	Jessico Carolo	Nominated	
Premios Gardel	2014	Album of the Year	Romantisísmico	Nominated	
Premios Gardel	2014	Best Rock Group Album	Romantisísmico	Won	
Premios Gardel	2014	Song of the Year	"La Lanza"	Nominated	
Premios Gardel	2014	Song of the Year	Best Music Video	Won	
Premios Gardel	2017	Best DVD	Desde Adentro & Impuesto de Fé	Won	
Premios Gardel	2018	Best Rock Group Album	Repuesto de Fé	Won	
Premios Gardel	2019	Album of the Year	Discutible	Nominated	
Premios Gardel	2019	Record of the Year	Discutible	Nominated	
Premios Gardel	2019	Best Rock Group Album	Discutible	Nominated	
Premios Gardel	2019	Song of the Year	"La Pregunta"	Nominated	
Premios Gardel	2019	Best Music Video	"La Pregunta"	Nominated	
Premios Gardel	2021	Song of the Year	"Suficiente"	Nominated	
Premios Gardel	2023	Album of the Year	Trinchera Avanzada	Nominated	
Premios Gardel	2023	Best Alternative Rock Album	Trinchera Avanzada	Won	
Premios Gardel	2023	Song of the Year	"Bye Bye"	Nominated	
Premios Gardel	2023	Best Catalogue Collection	A Propósito	Nominated	
Premios Quiero	2011	Video of the Year	"Muñeco de Haití"	Won	
Premios Quiero	2012	Best Rock Video	"Tormento"	Nominated	
Premios Quiero	2013	Best Rock Video	"La Lanza"	Nominated	
Premios Quiero	2013	Best Group Video	"La Lanza"	Nominated	
Premios Quiero	2016	Video of the Year	"Vampi"	Nominated	
Premios Quiero	2016	Best Rock Video	"Vampi"	Nominated	
Premios Quiero	2017	Best Live Video	"Yegua"	Nominated	
Premios Quiero	2018	Best Rock Video	"La Pregunta"	Nominated	
Premios Quiero	2019	Best Group Video	"La Pregunta"	Nominated	
Premios Quiero	2022	Best Group Video	"La Izquierda de la Noche"	Nominated	
Premios Quiero	2022	Best Rock Video	"BYE BYE"	Nominated	

== Interviews ==
- The Scenestar - March 2007
