= San Diego Chargers song =

San Diego Chargers song may refer to:

- San Diego Super Chargers, the disco fight song of the San Diego Chargers
- San Diego Chargers (song), the song by Plastilina Mosh
