= Mediocre (album) =

Studio album by Ximena Sariñana
- Released: 12 February 2008
- Recorded: May–August 2007
- Genres: Pop; rock; alternative; nueva canción; indie pop
- Length: 49:20
- Languages: Spanish; English
- Label: Warner Mexico
- Producers: Ximena Sariñana; Tweety González; Juan Campodónico; Gerardo Galván; Bruno Bressa

Ximena Sariñana chronology
Mediocre (2008)	Ximena Sariñana (2011)

Singles from Mediocre
- 1. "Vidas Paralelas" Released: January 24, 2008; 2. "La Tina (Metronomy)" Released: June 2008; 3. "No Vuelvo Más" Released: August 2008; 4. "Mediocre" Released: January 2009

Mediocre (Spanish pronunciation: [meˈðjokɾe]) is the debut studio album by Mexican singer-songwriter Ximena Sariñana, released in the US on 12 February 2008 via Warner Music Mexico. It reached number ten on the Billboard Latin Pop Albums, and spawned the hit single "Vidas Paralelas". The album gained additional attention when the iTunes Store featured Sariñana's song "Normal" as the canción de la semana —iTunes' free Latino song of the week— during the week of 8 July 2008.

Mediocre garnered positive reviews from many critics, receiving five stars from SoMinty, four stars from Time Out, and four stars from Rolling Stone. Many critics praised the album for being an eclectic album with a diverse style of songs featuring pop, rock, alternative, and nueva canción styles. It helped Sariñana receive a nomination for Best New Artist at the 9th Annual Latin Grammy Awards, it also received a nomination for Best Latin Rock, Alternative or Urban Album at the 51st Annual Grammy Awards.

In the summer of 2023, in celebration of the 15th anniversary of its release, Sariñana performed in a 4-show residency at the Lunario of the National Auditorium and one at the Teatro Metropolitano in Querétaro.

== Theme ==
Sariñana clarified that her title choice, "Mediocre", means to denounce mediocrity and conformity. She explained in an interview, "This whole idea of the perfect woman of the ‘50s is what the title song is about... There was no possibility of being something different, and that, in turn, created a prototype of a woman who was mediocre."

The album artwork for Mediocre meant to emulate the theme of mediocrity. Sariñana elaborated, "The cover is a take on the idea that women in the ‘40s and ‘50s had to be ‘perfect.’ Perfect hair, perfect clothes, sitting quietly and making perfect meals and embroidering perfectly. And, ironically, they were all perfect in the same, uninteresting way so that ended up making them all mediocre. That was the idea." Sariñana stressed that she did not intend to produce mediocre content for the album: "It’s not to say that the material is mediocre, but rather that it’s a message of irony, and I think the public gets that, but there are some people out there who like to poke fun at the title."

== Recording and production ==
Recording commenced in Buenos Aires, Argentina, in May 2007 and finished in August 2007. Various studio musicians were brought in for the recording of Mediocre. Bruno Bressa, the drummer of Volován, helped in the production process of the album, and also played the keyboard and tabla for its tracks. Argentine producer Tweety González and Uruguayan producer Juan Campodónico produced the album in 2008.

== Musical style ==
Vidas paralelas
A short audio clip from the track "Vidas paralelas".

Mediocre showcases rock, pop, and hip-hop influences. Jimmy Draper of Time Out New York describes the musical style as "full of buoyant, jazz-inflected pop with occasional electronic underpinnings and outbursts of rock". The album opens with "Mediocre", a heavily rock-influenced track, leading to the pop single "Vidas Paralelas". Sariñana relies heavily upon the piano in the pop track "Normal", which also features brass and vocal harmonies. "La Tina" displays a hip-hop influence through its use of electronic beats. "No Vuelvo Más" features Sariñana's use of additional vocal harmonies, as well as acoustic guitars. Ron Bronson of SoMinty points out that "Un Error" and "Sintiendo Rara" are slower songs reminiscent of Sariñana's interest in jazz.

Lissette Corsa of Orlando Weekly points out that Mediocre follows a unique contemporary jazz style. Corsa praises Mediocre, calling it a "deftly crafted alt-pop record", but notes that "it’s the electronic embellishments, dub effects and jazz trimmings—in the form of loose piano lines, subtle tempo changes and vocal improvisations—that make it unique." Corsa also praises Sariñana, whose "lyrics exhibit a remarkable depth for someone her age", saying Sariñana has "a keen understanding of composition and melodic structure".

=== Genres ===
Since Mediocre incorporates many different styles of music, the exact genre of the album is disputed. Allmusic classifies Mediocre as a pop/rock album with adult alternative pop/rock stylings. However, the iTunes Store classifies Mediocre as an alternativo album to accentuate its Latin American style as well as its alternative style. SoMinty classifies Mediocre as an indie pop album, and Rhapsody categorizes Mediocre as nueva canción, or "new song".

== Critical reception ==
Professional ratings
Review scores
Source	Rating
Allmusic	3.5/5 stars
Rolling Stone	4/5 stars
SoMinty	5/5 stars
Time Out	4/6 stars

Reception of Mediocre has been mostly positive, and many critics highly acclaim the album. The Rolling Stone staff rated Mediocre four stars, and Rolling Stone's average viewer rating is four and a half stars. Mark Kemp, a music journalist from Rolling Stone, called Mediocre one of the strongest debuts from a female singer-songwriter since Norah Jones' Come Away with Me, exclaiming "There's sultry torch songs, folky ballads, smart rock — and not a bum track among them." Ron Bronson, a music journalist from the website SoMinty, awarded Mediocre five stars. He describes Sariñana's voice on Mediocre as being "something along the lines of Nellie McKay meets countryman Julieta Venegas meets Sia. [Her voice is] original, in other words. Very original.... If you have any real desire to listen to music en español, you'll be hard pressed to find a better singer on the indie scene these days. Ximena has got chops, folks." Ernesto Sánchez of People en Español labeled Mediocre "one of the most promising Latin Music albums of [2008]". Eric Danton of The Hartford Courant pointed out that "her prospects in the United States are less predictable thanks to a fragmented radio landscape and what for many English-speaking listeners is a language barrier."

== Awards and nominations ==
Sariñana was nominated for two awards at the Latin Grammy Awards of 2008 for Mejor Nuevo Artista (Best New Artist) and Mejor Canción Alternativa (Best Alternative Song) for her single "Normal". Sariñana won an award at the MTV Latin America Awards 2008 for Artista Revelación (Discovery Artist).

On December 4, 2008 this album received a Grammy Award nomination for Best Latin Rock/Alternative Album.

== Track listing ==
No.	Title	Writer(s)	Length
1.	"Mediocre"	Ximena Sariñana	4:16
2.	"Vidas Paralelas"	Baltazar Hinojosa; Ximena Sariñana	3:57
3.	"Normal"	Ximena Sariñana	4:48
4.	"La Tina ^{a}"	Joaquín del Paso; Ximena Sariñana	3:56
5.	"Reforma"	Baltazar Hinojosa; Ximena Sariñana	3:25
6.	"No Vuelvo Más"	Leo Minax; Ximena Sariñana	4:13
7.	"Cambio de Piel"	Baltazar Hinojosa; Ximena Sariñana	3:53
8.	"Sintiendo Rara ^{b}"	Erik Coates	3:53
9.	"Un Error"	Baltazar Hinojosa; Ximena Sariñana	4:32
10.	"Gris ^{c}"	Juan Berta; Santiago Carámbula; Nicolás Kolender; Federico Lima; José López	3:07
11.	"Pocas Palabras"	Baltazar Hinojosa; Ximena Sariñana	6:15
12.	"Monitor ^{d}"	Bruno Bressa; Gerardo Galván; Chalo Galván	4:23
13.	"Pajaritos ^{f}"	Baltazar Hinojosa; Ximena Sariñana	3:04
14.	"No Vuelvo Más ^{f}" (Bo Tracks Mix)	Leo Minax; Ximena Sariñana	4:37
15.	"La Tina ^{f}" (By Metronomy)	Joaquín Del Paso; Ximena Sariñana	3:54
16.	"La Tina ^{f}" (Bo Tracks Mix)	Joaquín Del Paso; Ximena Sariñana	3:48
17.	"Reforma ^{e} ^{f}" (De Gala, en Ion y en Grande)	Baltazar Hinojosa; Ximena Sariñana	3:33
18.	"Mediocre ^{f}" (Original Version)	Ximena Sariñana	3:38
Total length:			49:20

=== Notes ===
- Data for composers compiled from Allmusic.
- Fields with an em dash (—) are not applicable.
- All tracks in **bold** have been released as singles (see the singles section for more details)

=== Direct notes ===
- **^a** "La Tina" was remixed by Metronomy in 2008 and released as a single.
- **^b** Originally performed by Erik Couts
- **^c** Originally performed by the Uruguayan band, Loop Lascano
- **^d** Performed with Volován.
- **^e** The second version of "Reforma" is only available through the iTunes Store.
- **^f** In special edition.

== Singles ==
"Vidas Paralelas" ("Parallel Lives"), the first single from Mediocre, was released on January 24, 2008. The remix of "La Tina" ("The Bathtub") by Metronomy was released in 2008, and an official music video on YouTube was released by Warner Music Mexico in July 2008. "Normal" was promoted on iTunes to the public in the United States in July 8, 2008, when it became the iTunes Latino Free Single of the Week. Los 40 Principales has announced that a music video for the title song will be released in the near future.

Year	Title	Length	Notes
2008	Vidas Paralelas	3:57	Released on January 24, 2008; Released as a digital download and a music video
2008	La Tina (Metronomy Remix)	3:51	Released to the public in June 2008; Informally released as a single
2008	Normal	3:40	Downloadable from July 8–14, 2008; Promoted in the iTunes Store as the descarga gratis de la semana — the free download of the week
2008	No Vuelvo Más	4:13	The music video on YouTube was uploaded by Warner Music Mexico in 2008.; Released as a digital download and music video
2009	Mediocre	4:16	The music video for "Mediocre" has been finished and has been released.

== Credits ==
The information below is provided by Allmusic, and the personnel are listed in alphabetical order.

Name	Instrument or Role	Personnel notes
Bruno Bressa	Keyboards, Tabla, Producer	Bressa, a drummer from Volován, played drums on their album Monitor (2007). Bressa composed the song "Monitor".
Ulises Butrón	Guitar	Butrón has also collaborated with Fito Páez, an Argentine musician.
Juan Campodónico	Arranger, Producer	An Uruguayan musician, Campodónico was a member of El Peyote Asesino and has produced numerous albums, including the original soundtrack to Shrek 2.
Héctor Castillo	Mixing	Castillo has engineered many albums, including John Legend's album Once Again (2006), and Björk's album Volta (2007).
Nico Cota	Percussion, Drums, Hand Drums	Cota played percussion on Luis Alberto Spinetta's album Los Ojos (2005).
Uriel Dorfman	Engineer, Mixing	Dorfman has engineered many successful albums, including Alexandre Pires' album Alma Brasileira (2004) and Gustavo Cerati's album Ahí vamos (2006).
Alejandro Franov	Piano, Accordion, Sintesi del Suono Med	Franov acted as the librettist of Gustavo Cerati's album 11 Episodios Sinfónicos (2002). His first solo album, Khali, was released in 2007.
Gerardo Galván	Guitar, Keyboards, Producer	Galván sings with Volován. He composed the song "Monitor" with brother Chalo Galván and drummer Bruno Bressa.
Hernán González	Trombone	Hernán played the bass for Plastilina Mosh on the albums Aquamosh (1998) and Hola Chicuelos (2003).
Tweety González	Piano, Keyboards, Producer, Engineer, Mixing	González has been on the music scene since 1990. He engineered Shakira's Oral Fixation Vol. 2 in 2005. González has worked extensively with Soda Stereo and played various instruments on Gustavo Cerati's album Ahí vamos (2006).
Mariano Lopez	Engineer	Lopez has engineered and produced Illya Kuryaki and the Valderramas' albums Horno para calentar los mares (1993), Chaco (1996), Leche (1999), and Kury Akistan (2003). He has also recorded Soda Stereo and Luis Alberto Spinetta.
Alejandro Piccone	Fiscornio	Piccone plays trumpet for the band La Vela Puerca.
Ximena Sariñana	Piano, Programming, Vocals, Producer, Vocals	Before Mediocre, Sariñana acted in various movies and telenovelas. Mediocre is officially Sariñana's debut album.
Luciano Supervielle	Piano, Arranger, Casio, Brass	Supervielle, along with Juan Campodónico and six others, is a member of the South American band Bajofondo. He has also played keyboard with Uruguayan musician Jorge Drexler.
Sergio Toporek	Graphic Design, Graphic Conception	Toporek designed the cover of Mediocre. He has also designed covers for other groups, including Café Tacuba's album Re (1994), their compilation Lo Essential de Café Tacuba (2001), and Aleks Syntek's Más Fuerte De Lo Que Pensaba (1994).
Guillermo Vadala	Bajo sexto	Vadala is a bassist. He has played with Fito Páez, Julieta Venegas, and with Thalía on her album El Sexto Sentido (2005).

== Chart performance ==
Chart (2008)	Peak position
Mexico Top 100 Mexico	2
US Billboard Top Latin Albums	38
US Billboard Latin Pop Albums	10

=== Album certifications ===
Region	Certification	Certified units/sales
Mexico (AMPROFON)	Platinum	80,000^{^}
^{^} Shipments figures based on certification alone.

== See also ==
- Music of Mexico
