= Avanzada Regia =

Mexican musical movement

Avanzada Regia was the name given to a successful Mexican musical movement originating in Monterrey, the capital city of the state of Nuevo León. The movement began professionally in 1995, although its pioneers started playing in local bars in 1994, gaining attention and recognition within the community.

Avanzada Regia stood out for its musical diversity and for being the first generation of alternative bands from outside the capital to achieve national success.

== Origins ==
In 1995, the group Zurdok Movimiento won the Battle of the Bands at the Rockotitlan music festival, becoming the first band not from Mexico City to win it, thus creating such expectations towards the city that the record labels began to move there to search for groups. La Ultima de Lucas, made up of young people all under twenty years old, but which had talented musicians in its lineup, was the first band from Monterrey to sign a record contract.

The Hispanic American phenomenon of Control Machete was followed by, by way of a domino effect, more bands. Zurdok Movimiento (who started it all) were finally signed by Discos Manicomio, an imprint of PolyGram, as well as the rapcore group called La Flor de Lingo.

== Albums released by Avanzada regia bands ==
- Mucho Barato, Control Machete, 1996
- Antena, Zurdok, 1997
- Aquamosh, Plastilina Mosh, 1997
- Libres y locos, El Gran Silencio, 1998
- Guadalupe Flava, Flor de Lingo, 1998
- Restaurant, Jumbo, 1999
- Artillería pesada, Control Machete, 1999
- Hombre Sintetizador, Zurdok, 1999
- Tatuajes de pólvora, Cabrito Vudú, 1999
- Juan Manuel, Plastilina Mosh, 2000
- Chúntaro Radio Poder, El Gran Silencio, 2000
- ¿Picas o platicas?, Genitallica, 2000
- Galería, Turbo 7, 2000
- Arroz con leche, Panda, 2000
- D. D. y ponle Play, Jumbo, 2001
- Maquillaje, Zurdok, 2001
- Kinky, Kinky, 2001
- Volován, Volován, 2002
- El canto que espanta la pena, La Verbena Popular, 2002
- Alma en fuego, Inspector, 2002
- Sin vaselina, Genitallica, 2002
- Cartel de Santa, Cartel de Santa, 2002
- La Revancha Del Príncipe Charro, Panda, 2002
- Ella es azul, Volován, 2003
- Teleparque, Jumbo, 2003
- Uno, Dos: Bandera, Control Machete, 2003
- Hola Chicuelos, Plastilina Mosh, 2003
- Atlas, Kinky, 2003
- Ni lados B, ni lados A, Cabrito Vudú, 2003
- Super Riddim Internacional Vol. 1, El Gran Silencio, 2004
- Cartel de Santa Vol II, Cartel de Santa, 2004
- ConSEXcuencias, Genitallica, 2004
- Unidad, Cerveza y Ska, Inspector, 2004
- Boomerang, Cabrito Vudú, 2004
- Cuarto Gris, Mares de Nepente, 2005
- Para ti con desprecio, Panda, 2005
- Gran Panoramico, Jumbo, 2005
- Vaquero, Vaquero, 2005
- Monitor, Volován, 2006
- Reina, Kinky, 2006
- Volumen Prohibido, Cartel de Santa, 2006
- Tasty + B-Sides, Plastilina Mosh, 2006
- Comunicaflow Underground, El Gran Silencio, 2006
- Blanco fácil, Chetes, 2006
- Amantes Sunt Amentes, Panda, 2006
- Amar o morir, Inspector, 2006
- Monitor (special edition), Volován, 2007
- Dusan (album), Dusan, 2007
- Segundo Round, Flor De Lingo, 2007
- Efecto Dominó, Chetes, 2008
- Volumen IV, Cartel de Santa, 2008
- Barracuda, Kinky, 2008
- Hogar, Volován, 2009
- Poetics, Panda, 2009
- Solo con plumón, Filozofia pAnk, 2010
- Canciones de amor para un mundo imperfecto, Jáuregui, 2010
- Hipnosis, Chetes, 2010
- Sueño de la Maquina, Kinky, 2011

== See also ==
- Latin hip hop
- Latino punk
- Rock en tu idioma
- Mexican rock
- Mexican hip hop
