= David Bernal =

American illusionary dancer

David "Elsewhere" Bernal
- Born: August 2, 1979 (age 46)
- Occupation: Dancer

David "Elsewhere" Bernal (born August 2, 1979) is an American illusionary dancer. He became known through a viral video clip—often titled Kolla2001—of his participation in the 2001 edition of the Korean American talent show Kollaboration. He danced to the Kraftwerk song "Expo 2000". He has been involved as a dancer in videos, advertisements, and Alice in Wonderland, a Tim Burton film. He has also worked with artists such as Michael Jackson.

== Background ==
Bernal is from Santa Ana, California. His mother is Peruvian and his father grew up in New Mexico. Contrary to a popular misconception, David is not double jointed. He says:

The only place where I am double-jointed in my thumbs, which doesn't even matter. I would say I'm probably a little more flexible than most people in certain areas, mainly my shoulders and my ankles, but I wasn't born that way. Those areas became flexible because of years of practicing."

== Viral video ==
David Bernal first became known through a 2001 video with him dancing in a competition with Mike Song of the Kinjaz at Kollaboration, an Asian-American talent show. The video went viral. The clip showcased Bernal's characteristic contemporary dance style of popping and abstract waving. Performances of the dances were rare at the time and the clip became very popular when it circulated on the internet—so popular that in November 2006, The Viral Factory, a viral marketing company, collated page-impression figures from websites including YouTube and Google Videos. They determined that, as of November 2006, the video had been viewed over 200 million times, making it the 8th most viewed video.

== Career ==
After his exposure in the viral video, Bernal was hired to participate in a number of advertisements like Heineken (dancing to "Cobrastyle" by the Teddybears), Volkswagen, Apple iPod, 7-Eleven Slurpee, Pepsi, Puma, and Doritos. He made a cameo appearance in the 2004 film You Got Served and in TV performances including on The Tonight Show with Jay Leno.

Computer graphics technology were used in several of the commercials in which Bernal performs. Other people's (old, young, male, female) faces were superimposed onto his body so that they appear to be dancing in the same style he does. One of the most popular instances is in a commercial for the Volkswagen Golf GTI, created in January 2005. Gene Kelly's head was superimposed onto Bernal's body in a re-enactment of "Singin' in the Rain" remixed by Manchester group Mint Royale. Bernal filmed and edited a large amount of Detours, a documentary video which features experimental dance styles, focused primarily on four dancers: Midus, Kujo, Rawbzilla, and Elsewhere. While focusing much of the video on the four primary dancers, dozens of others were also featured in the video. The project has since ended, and videos can be bought through various websites. In September 2006, he was featured in the music video for "Sister Twisted", a song by Mexican band Kinky, in which he plays a Mexican cowboy who does a twisted locking and popping performance while a war against aliens occurs in the background.

On August 8, 2007, Bernal and his dancing was featured in a segment of the inaugural episode of ABC's video-clip program, i-Caught. He was collaborating with Michael Jackson for Jackson's This Is It residency at London's O2 Arena prior to Jackson's death. Bernal was the dance double for the Mad Hatter in Tim Burton's Alice in Wonderland (2010) during the "Futterwacken" dance. Bernal worked with artist Nicholas Galanin to dance in a video titled "Tsu Heidel Shugaxtutaan" or "We will again open this container of wisdom that has been left in our care". He has also collaborated with other dancers such as Mori Koichiro (森弘一郎).
