= No Todo Lo Puedes Dar =

Studio album by Ximena Sariñana
- Released: November 4, 2014
- Recorded: 2014
- Genre: Pop, rock, alternative, nueva canción, and indie pop (see musical style)
- Length: 49:20
- Language: Spanish
- Label: Warner Music Group
- Producer: Ximena Sariñana, John Congleton, Jim Eno, Alejandro Rosso

Ximena Sariñana chronology
Ximena Sariñana (2011)	No Todo Lo Puedes Dar (2014)	¿Dónde Bailarán Las Niñas? (2019)

Singles from No Todo Lo Puedes Dar
- 1. "Sin Ti No Puede Estar Tan Mal" Released: September 18, 2014; 2. "Ruptura" Released: March 17, 2015

No Todo Lo Puedes Dar is the third album of Mexican singer and actress Ximena Sariñana. The album was released on November 4, 2014.

== Track listings ==
No.	Title	Writer(s)	Length
1.	"Parar A Tiempo"	Ximena Sariñana / Alejandro Rosso	4:39
2.	"La Vida No Es Fácil"	Ximena Sariñana	3:48
3.	"No Voy A Decir Que No"	Ximena Sariñana / Juan Manuel Torreblanca	3:31
4.	"Sin Ti No Puede Estar Tan Mal"	Ximena Sariñana / Aureo Baqueiro	4:35
5.	"No Todo Lo Puedes Dar"	Ximena Sariñana	4:47
6.	"Ruptura"	Ximena Sariñana / Mario Domm	4:09
7.	"No Vas A Venir"	Ximena Sariñana / Tommy Torres	3:42
8.	"Cuando Mientes"	Ximena Sariñana / Aureo Baqueiro	2:58
9.	"Este Final"	Ximena Sariñana / Aureo Baqueiro	4:10
10.	"Un Amor / En medio De La Noche"	Ximena Sariñana	6:43
11.	"Cuidado Conmigo"	Ximena Sariñana / Alex Ferreira	4:04
12.	"Juntos Por Siempre (We Belong)"	Ximena Sariñana / Dan Navarro / David Eric Lowen	3:37
Total length:			49:20

=== Deluxe Edition ===
Disc one
No.	Title	Writer(s)	Length
1.	"Parar A Tiempo"	Ximena Sariñana / Alejandro Rosso	4:39
2.	"La Vida No Es Fácil"	Ximena Sariñana	3:48
3.	"No Voy A Decir Que No"	Ximena Sariñana / Juan Manuel Torreblanca	3:31
4.	"Sin Ti No Puede Estar Tan Mal"	Ximena Sariñana / Áureo Baqueiro	4:35
5.	"No Todo Lo Puedes Dar"	Ximena Sariñana	4:47
6.	"Ruptura"	Ximena Sariñana / Mario Domm	4:09
7.	"No Vas A Venir"	Ximena Sariñana / Tommy Torres	3:42
8.	"Cuando Mientes"	Ximena Sariñana / Áureo Baqueiro	2:58
9.	"Este Final"	Ximena Sariñana / Áureo Baqueiro	4:10
10.	"Un Amor / En medio De La Noche"	Ximena Sariñana	6:43
11.	"Cuidado Conmigo"	Ximena Sariñana / Álex Ferreira	4:04

Disc two
No.	Title	Writer(s)	Length
1.	"La Vida No Es Fácil (Live)"	Ximena Sariñana	3:54
2.	"La Tina (Live)"	Ximena Sariñana	4:12
3.	"No Voy A Decir Que No (Live)" (featuring Juan Manuel Torreblanca)	Ximena Sariñana / Juan Manuel Torreblanca	3:46
4.	"Normal (Live)"	Ximena Sariñana	4:10
5.	"Aire Soy (Live)"	Miguel Bosé / Riccardo Giagni	3:42
6.	"Ruptura (Live)"	Ximena Sariñana / Mario Domm	4:05
7.	"Fiesta Forever (Live)"		4:15
8.	"No Vuelvo Más (Live)"	Ximena Sariñana / Leo Minax	4:47
9.	"Sin Ti No Puede Estar Tan Mal (Live)"	Ximena Sariñana / Áureo Baqueiro	4:36
10.	"En Clave (Live)"	Ximena Sariñana / Leiva	5:17

DVD
No.	Title	Writer(s)	Length
1.	"La Vida No Es Fácil (Live)"	Ximena Sariñana	3:54
2.	"La Tina (Live)"	Ximena Sariñana	4:12
3.	"No Voy A Decir Que No (Live)" (featuring Juan Manuel Torreblanca)	Ximena Sariñana / Juan Manuel Torreblanca	3:46
4.	"Normal (Live)"	Ximena Sariñana	4:10
5.	"Aire Soy (Live)"	Miguel Bosé / Riccardo Giagni	3:42
6.	"Ruptura (Live)"	Ximena Sariñana / Mario Domm	4:05
7.	"Fiesta Forever (Live)"		4:15
8.	"No Vuelvo Más (Live)"	Ximena Sariñana / Leo Minax	4:47
9.	"Sin Ti No Puede Estar Tan Mal (Live)"	Ximena Sariñana / Áureo Baqueiro	4:36
10.	"En Clave (Live)"	Ximena Sariñana / Leiva	5:17
