= SDSC =

SDSC may refer to:

- San Diego Supercomputer Center
- Satish Dhawan Space Centre
- Strategic and Defence Studies Centre
- Secure Digital Standard Capacity card
- São Carlos Airport (ICAO-Code)
- San Diego Super Chargers
