= ¿Dónde Bailarán las Niñas? =

¿Dónde Bailarán Las Niñas?

Studio album by Ximena Sariñana
- Released: March 1, 2019
- Recorded: 2018
- Genre: Pop, alternative, nueva canción, and indie pop (see musical style)
- Length: 49:20
- Language: Spanish
- Label: Warner Music Group
- Producer: Ximena Sariñana, Juan Pablo Vega.

Ximena Sariñana chronology
No Todo Lo Puedes Dar (2014)	¿Dónde Bailarán Las Niñas? (2019)	Amor Adolescente (2021)

Singles from ¿Dónde Bailarán Las Niñas?
- 1. "¿Qué Tiene?" Released: August 10, 2018; 2. "Si Tú Te Vas" Released: November 09, 2018; 3. "Lo Bailado" Released: January 18, 2019; 4. "Cobarde" Released: March 01, 2019

¿Dónde Bailarán Las Niñas? is the fourth album of Mexican singer and actress Ximena Sariñana.

== History ==
The album was released on March 1, 2019.

== Track listing ==
No.	Title	Writer(s)	Length
1.	"¿Qué Tiene?"	Ximena Sariñana, Juan Pablo Vega, Feid, Jowan, Mosty, Rolo & Wain, Carlos Alberto Carmona	2:57
2.	"No Sé" (feat. Girl Ultra)	Ximena Sariñana, Juan Pablo Vega, Feid, Jowan, Girl Ultra, Mosty, Rolo & Wain	3:38
3.	"Si Tú Te Vas"	Ximena Sariñana, Andrés Torres & Mauricio Rengifo	3:08
4.	"Pueblo Abandonado" (feat. Francisca Valenzuela)	Ximena Sariñana, Francisca Valenzuela & Áureo Baqueiro	3:35
5.	"Que Seas Tú"	Ximena Sariñana & Andrés Cabas	3:31
6.	"Lo Bailado"	Ximena Sariñana, Juan Pablo Vega, Feid, Jowan, Mosty, Rolo & Wain	2:53
7.	"Todo En Mi Vida"	Ximena Sariñana, Andrés Torres & Mauricio Rengifo	3:24
8.	"Fácil De Amar" (feat. Iza)	Ximena Sariñana & IZA	4:16
9.	"Fuego"	Ximena Sariñana & Juan Pablo Vega	4:23
10.	"Cobarde"	Ximena Sariñana, Andrés Torres & Mauricio Rengifo	3:34
11.	"Huracán"	Ximena Sariñana, Juan Pablo Vega, Feid, Jowan, Mosty, Rolo & Wain	6:19
Total length:			49:20
