= Rarities (Kinky album) =

Compilation album by Kinky
- Released: July 25, 2006
- Genre: Electronica, Rock en Español
- Length: 57:46
- Label: Sonic360

Kinky chronology
Reina (2006)	Rarities (2006)	Barracuda (2009)

Rarities is a compilation album by Mexican band Kinky. It was released in July 2006 on Sonic360 Records.

== Track listing ==
1. "Coqueta" – 3:39
2. "Oye Como Va (Extended Mix)" – 4:29
3. "Selva Lombardi" – 2:19
4. "Canibal" – 4:04
5. "Presidente (Money Mark Remix)" – 3:41
6. "Aquí Es la Vida" – 3:49
7. "Soun Tha Primer Amor (Bostich Remix)" – 3:08
8. "Five Rooms" – 1:47
9. "Más (Toy Selectah Remix)" – 5:03
10. "Soun Tha Primer Amor (Capri Remix)" – 7:44
11. "Oye Como Va (Lazyboy Instrumental)" – 3:33
12. "Más (Live)" – 4:04
13. "The Headphonist (Live)" – 4:54
14. "Sol (Live)" – 5:32
