= Desafío =

Desafío (Spanish for "challenge") may refer to:

- Desafío (TV series)
- El Desafío, a 1995 Venezuelan telenovela directed by Renato Gutiérrez
- Desafío (album), by various artists, 2003
  - "Desafío (intro)", the album's title track
- Desafío, a 2006 album by Malú
  - "Desafío", the album's title track
- Desafíos, a 2015 album by las Pastillas del Abuelo
- "Desafío", a song by Arca from Arca
- "Desafío", a song by Jory Boy featuring Maluma
- "Desafío", a song by Jorge Rojas
- "Desafío", a song by Ximena Sariñana from No Todo Lo Puedes Dar
- "El Desafío", a song by Jose el Pillo and Daddy Yankee
