= Aquamosh =

Studio album by Plastilina Mosh
- Released: June 30, 1998 (Mexico)
- Genre: Avanzada Regia
- Length: 48:58
- Label: EMI Mexico
- Producers: Tom Rothrock; Rob Schnapf; Sukia; Plastilina Mosh; Cafe Tacuba; Jason Roberts

Plastilina Mosh chronology
Aquamosh (1998)	Juan Manuel (2000)

Professional ratings
Review scores
Source	Rating
Allmusic	3/5 stars
Rolling Stone	4/5 stars

Aquamosh is the first studio album by the Mexican Avanzada Regia group Plastilina Mosh. It was released on June 30, 1998, in Mexico. The songs "Monster Truck" and "Encendedor" were featured in the skateboarding game Street Sk8er, while "Afroman" was featured in True Crime: Streets of LA. The album cover features the sculptures Aquamosh by Aldo Chaparro.

== Track listing ==
1. "Niño Bomba" (J. Gonzales, J. Modeliste, A. Neville, L. Nocentelli, G. Porteri, A. Rosso) – 3:43
2. "Afroman" (Jonas/Alejandro Rosso) – 3:38
3. "Ode to Mauricio Garcés" (Jonas/Alejandro Rosso) – 4:14
4. "Banano's Bar" (Jonas/Alejandro Rosso) - 5:48
5. "Monster Truck" (C. Borrell, A. Fuentes, R. Harris, G. Marks, Plastilina Mosh) - 4:18
6. "Encendedor" (Jonas/Alejandro Rosso) - 2:36
7. "Bungaloo Punta Cometa" (Jonas/Alejandro Rosso) - 3:59
8. "Aquamosh" (E. Blake, C. Borrell, A. Fuentes, R. Harris, G. Marks, Plastilina Mosh) - 3:56
9. "I've Got That Milton Pacheco Kinda' Feeling" (E. Blake, Plastilina Mosh) - 4:22
10. "Pornoshop" (Jonas/Alejandro Rosso) - 3:31
11. "Savage Sucker Boy" (Jonas/Alejandro Rosso) - 3:32
12. "Mr. P. Mosh" (Plastilina Mosh/Jason Roberts) - 4:21
