= Atlas (Kinky album) =

Studio album by Kinky
- Released: November 18, 2003
- Recorded: 2003
- Length: 44:53
- Label: Sonic360 Nettwerk
- Producers: Thom Russo, Kinky

Kinky chronology
Kinky (2002)	Atlas (2003)	Oye Como Va (2005)

Professional ratings
Aggregate scores
Source	Rating
Metacritic	76/100
Review scores
Source	Rating
AllMusic	3.5/5 stars
Blender	4/5 stars
E! Online	B−
Entertainment Weekly	B+
The Guardian	2/5 stars
Pitchfork	7.2/10
Rolling Stone	2/5 stars
Spin	B+
Uncut	3/5

Atlas is the second studio album by the Mexican Avanzada Regia electropop band Kinky. It was released on December 2, 2003, on Sonic360 (Nettwerk for the US and Canada).

Track 2, "The Headphonist" features vocals by John McCrea, lead singer of the American band CAKE.

== Track listing ==
1. "Presidente" – 3:22
2. "The Headphonist" – 4:55
3. "Snapshot" – 3:07
4. "Salta-Lenin-El-Atlas" – 3:44
5. "Do U Like It?" – 4:42
6. "Airport Feelings" – 3:25
7. "Pos Que Se Vengan" – 4:21
8. "Minotauro" – 3:49
9. "Not Afraid" – 3:09
10. "My God Is So Quiet" – 3:01
11. "María Jose" – 4:25
12. "Semillas de Menta" – 2:53
