= Nicholas Galanin =

Nicholas Galanin Yéil Ya-Tseen
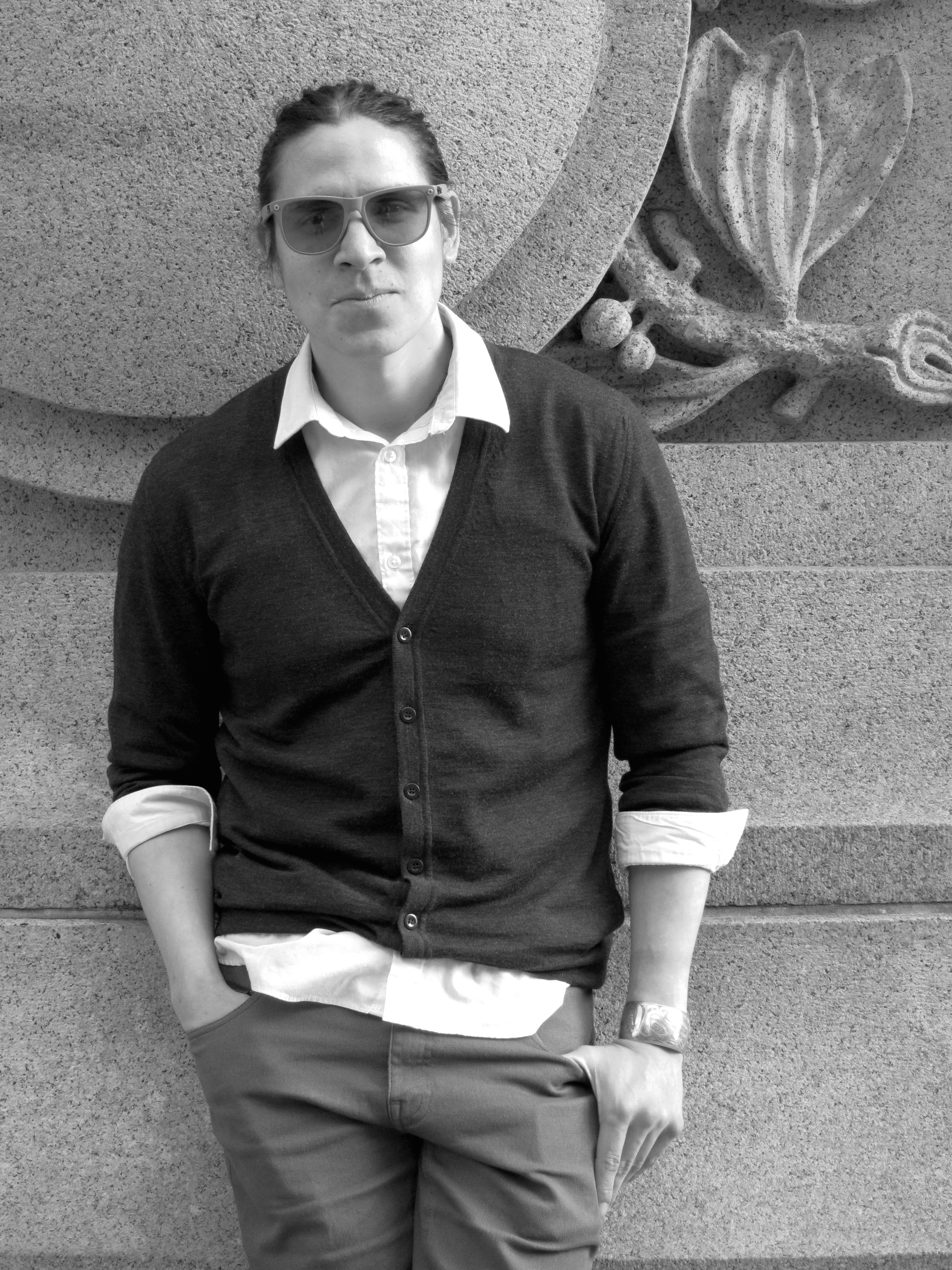
- Nicholas Galanin in May 2011

Background information
- Also known as: Silver Jackson
- Born: 1979 (age 46–47); Sitka, Alaska, U.S.
- Origin: Sitka, Alaska, U.S.
- Genre: Electronic
- Years active: 2006–present
- Labels: Home Skillet Records; Unbound Records of the Anchorage Museum
- Website: http://galan.in/

Nicholas Galanin (born 1979) is a Sitka Tribe of Alaska multi-disciplinary artist and musician of Tlingit and Unangax̂ descent. His work often explores a dialogue of change and identity between Native and non-Native communities.

== Background ==
Nicholas Galanin was born in Sitka, Alaska, in 1979. As a young boy, he learned to work with jewelry and metals from his father and uncle. He is also the grandchild of master carver George Benson. At the age of eighteen, Galanin worked a desk job at the Sitka National Historical Park. When he was discovered drawing Tlingit art, on a slow day at the park, he was informed that he was only allowed to read Russian history books during working hours. So, he quit his job to pursue art. He recalls this as his last job that was non-creative.

In 2003, At London Guildhall University in England, he studied silversmithing and received a Bachelors of Fine Arts with honors in Jewelry Design & Silversmithing. In 2007, he received a Masters of Fine Arts in indigenous visual arts at Massey University in New Zealand. Galanin has also done apprenticeships with master carvers and jewelers.

== Artwork ==
=== Totems to Turquoise & What Have We Become? ===
His first exhibition, in 2004, was entitled Totems to Turquoise, and was hosted at the Museum of Natural History in New York City.

In 2006, he created a book sculpture series, entitled What Have We Become? which incorporated blank pages and pages from 19th century anthropological books, which he "carved into, hand cut and laser engraved".

=== Tsu Heidei Shugaxtutaan ===
In 2008, Galanin's work was featured in "Beat Nation: Art, Hip Hop and Aboriginal Culture" exhibition at The Power Plant Contemporary Art Gallery. It was co-curated by Kathleen Ritter and Tania Willard, and featured the work of twenty-three aboriginal artists.

Galanin's entry, entitled Tsu Heidei Shugaxtutaan, is a two-part looping video of dance and music that mixes elements of traditional Tlingit and hip hop. In the first video, David "Elsewhere" Bernal is popping to a customary Tlingit song. In the second, Dan Littlefield appears in customary Tlingit regalia and dances to electronic music. The Tlingit song contains the words used in the title of the piece, Tsu Heidei Shugaxtutaan, which is pronounced "soo HAYdee shoe GAK tu tahn" and means "We Will Again Open This Container of Wisdom That Has Been Left in Our Care". In 2012, this work was featured in "Shapeshifting: Transformations in Native American Art", an exhibit hosted by the Peabody Essex Museum of Salem, Massachusetts.

=== S’igeika’awu: Ghost ===
In 2009, S’igeika’awu: Ghost was displayed in a new wing of the Anchorage Museum. This work was described as "resembling both a Native mask and a piece of Delftware." The fusion of this work reminds viewers of the period when ceremonial Native masks were considered worthless, but fine porcelain was a valuable commodity.

=== Things are Looking Native, Native’s Looking Whiter ===
Things are Looking Native, Native’s Looking Whiter was the centerpiece of "Unsettled", an exhibit hosted by the Nevada Museum of Art. It is a photographic giclée montage print that bisects and combines two photographs. On the left is a 1906 Edward S. Curtis image entitled "Tewa Girl", a photograph of an unnamed Hopi-Tewa girl with a traditional "squash blossom" hairstyle. The right half of the photo-montage depicts Carrie Fisher as Princess Leia from the 1977 film Star Wars Episode IV: A New Hope with her classic "cinnamon roll" hair style. Galanin's work is intended as a "commentary on cultural appropriation in popular media", which is largely dominated by white actors and directors.

Edward S. Curtis was an ethnographer, who sought to photograph and record, on wax cylinders, and in written notes, "the mode of life of one of the great races of mankind, [which] must be collected at once or the opportunity will be lost." The records that he made, over a twenty-year period, [1906-1926] is, in most cases, the only photographic, recorded or written history of the Indigenous people of over eighty tribes.

Despite Curtis's two decades of dedicated and underpaid work, Galanin, in an interview with the Reno Gazette-Journal, argues that Curtis’ 40,000 photos of 80 Indigenous tribes were "stereotyping and romanticizing the Indigenous people". He continued: "When you choose, cherry pick, to devalue the artisans of a community, but then decide that it has value or use to you, you've removed context from the creators of it. That echoes the history that we're talking about. It's not a business deal; we're not open to business. It's thievery, really."

Although Galanin was uncertain if the Star Wars character's likeness to the Hopi-Tewa woman was deliberate or unintentional, he felt that "the influence was implied". This particular hairstyle was also popular in Medieval Europe, centuries prior to the "discovery " of the Americas. "I challenge those who view or listen to my work to consider that Indigenous people are not contained by colonial mechanisms designed to erase our existence through continually narrowing categories of Indian-ness".

=== Works (2013–2017) ===
In 2013, Galanin's artwork was featured at the Alaska State Museum.

In 2015, Galanin designed a logo for Tribal Sports, a brand created by the Sitka Tribe of Alaska and Baden Sports of Seattle. The logo was intended appear on Alaskan school basketballs and baseballs.

In 2016, You Are on Indisneyian Land was displayed at the "Race and Revolution" exhibition at Nolan Park on Governors Island. The same year, Kill the Indian, Save the Man was shown at the Anchorage Museum.

In 2017, his work was displayed at the Venice Biennale's Native American Pavilion. He was the lead carver of a totem pole that was erected in Savikko Park on Douglas Island.

=== Dear Listener: Works by Nicholas Galanin ===
A retrospective of Galanin's works called "Dear Listener: Works by Nicholas Galanin" was held at the Heard Museum in Phoenix, Arizona, in the fall of 2018. The 12,000 square-foot exhibition, displaying fifteen years of Galanin's works, was the largest contemporary arts exhibition to be shown at the Heard Museum in over a decade. One of Galanin's collaborators, Nep Sidhu, helped mount the exhibition. The opening event featured music by Galanin's band Indian Agent, along with the band Shabazz Palaces.

The exhibition showed over fifty works by Galanin, including many of his well-known pieces such as We Dreamt Deaf, White Noise American Prayer Rug, and Things Are Looking Native, Native's Looking Whiter. Nicholas Galanin collaborated with his brother, Jerrod Galanin, (credited as Leonard Getinthecar) on A Supple Plunder. This work consists of nine ballistic gel torsos, and is a memorial to the twelve Unangan men who were lined up and shot by Russian settlers to see how many men a bullet could travel through and kill.

God Complex is a "crucifix" made of porcelain police riot gear, and provides commentary on the role of the police and religion in the process of cultural supremacy and cultural genocide. The American Dream is Alie and Well, presents an American flag, which is shaped like a bear hide. With bullets for claws and gold teeth in its mouth, it was one of many pieces that contrasted the native and non-native perspective on the American dream.

Another work entitled Indian Children's Bracelet is a hand-engraved set of child-sized handcuffs that represent the Indigenous children who were forced into American boarding schools, which were intended to assimilate them into European culture. The piece is one of three pairs that will never be displayed together, as a symbolic way of demonstrating how Indigenous families were torn apart and separated by the American boarding school system. The other two pairs are in the permanent collections of the Alaska State Museum and the Portland Museum.

Galanin's silver jewelry, some of which was worn by Erykah Badu, was on display at the museum. At the opening, Galanin felt overwhelmed by questions from the non-Indigenous docents. The Indigenous attendees praised the exhibition because they felt it was empowering.

=== Works (2019) ===
In 2019, Galanin's The Value of Sharpness: When It Falls was displayed at the Open Source Gallery in New York. His work, We Dreamt Deaf was displayed at the Macalester College's Law Warschaw Gallery. It features a taxidermied polar bear from Shishmaref whose hindquarters not stuffed. This work is a criticism of hunting for sport and trophy hunting as well as a statement on how climate change constitutes violent act against animals, like the polar bear, who appears to be melting due to global warming. In 2019, Galanin's work was displayed at the Honolulu Biennial.

=== Carry a Song / Disrupt an Anthem ===
The Peter Blum Gallery in New York City displayed two monotype series created by Nicholas Galanin for the International Fine Print Dealers Association's (IFPDA) 2020 Fall selection of the Fine Art Print Fair. The artworks presented in the two series were made through the process of printmaking.

The 2018 monotype series, Everything We’ve Ever Been, Everything We Are Right Now, previously shown at the 2019 Twin Cities Zine Fest, consisted of seven pieces and is "a reference to an ancestral entrance dance where the face is revealed, not masked". A series entitled Let them Enter Dancing and Showing Their Faces is collected in a monograph. Galanin's work shows that Tlingit art is not stagnant or dying, but continues to change and progress.

Also, in 2018, Galanin mounted a solo exhibit at Peter Blum Gallery, Carry a Song / Disrupt an Anthem, which featuring six major works, which explore how Indigenous identity is subverted by American culture. The message was most clearly conveyed by White Noise, American Prayer Rug and The Imaginary Indian (Totem Pole), which provided commentary on the distractions of American culture and a critique of assimilation. Similarly, two of Galanin's works, Architecture of return, escape and Land Swipe attempt to explore how Indigenous cultural items have been forcefully removed from Indigenous communities and confined to museums.

=== Shadow on the land, an excavation and bush burial ===
ARTnews Magazine announced the lineup of ninety-eight artists for the 22nd Biennale of Sydney (Australia) in 2020 and mentioned Nicholas Galanin as one of the prominent artists. The Biennale of Sydney was curated by Wiradjuri member Brook Andrew, who chose the word "NIRIN" as the title of the event, which is the Wiradjuri word for "edge". The exhibit focuses on "unresolved past anxieties and hidden layers of the supernatural," and presents the work of the Indigenous and diaspora communities that are not normally at the center of the art world.

Here, Galanin presented Shadow on the land, an excavation and bush burial, which was a grave in the shape of the statue of Captain James Cook's shadow in Hyde Park. Galanin commented on the piece saying, "By creating a hole large enough to bury the statue, the work’s excavation (along with its title) suggests the burial of the Cook monument itself, along with the burial of destructive governance and treatment of Indigenous land, Indigenous people and Indigenous knowledge".

The year 2020 was the 250th anniversary of Captain James Cook's colonization of the already inhabited continent of Australia. Galanin advocates for the removal of statues which venerate colonial settlers, because he believes they represent a white supremacist and violent ideology. However, he believes that removing statues of colonialists and changing mascots from caricatures of Indigenous people is not enough, and this should be followed by economic justice. The call to remove the James Cook statue in Sydney is part of an ongoing movement to remove James Cook statues in Hawaii and Anchorage. The movement to remove statues related to colonization, has also been compared to Black Lives Matter protesters calling for the removal of statues of slave-owners and confederate soldiers. Galanin was briefly interviewed by Casey Grove of Alaska Public Media concerning the importance of art and its inspiration.

There has been a larger movement, specifically in Alaska, that has called for the removal of statues of colonial figures such as Captain Cook, William Seward, and Alexander Baranov. Galanin was involved in the removal of the statue of Alexander Baranov in Anchorage. According to Galanin, Baranov "is responsible for murder, enslavement, rape and [is] a perpetrator of genocide". An opinion piece by Georgy Manaev criticized the movement to remove the statue, citing an overzealous cancel culture as the movement's motivation. Manaev stated that Baranov "wasn’t the first to start the conflict between the Russians and the native Alaskan tribes", which led him to believe that Baranov's statue shouldn't be the targeted for removal.

== Music ==
Nicholas Galanin began his solo project under the stage name Silver Jackson, and is part of a collective called The Black Constellation.

He started his own record label and a music festival called Home Skillet Festival. He released his first extended play, Moves Like Music in 2007. He released his debut album, which was self-titled, in 2008. In 2009, he released his sophomore album Thought I Found Gold. In 2011, Silver Jackson released a single, "Wild Woman" and in 2012, an album entitled It's Glimmering Now. In 2014, Silver Jackson released two promotional singles; "Perfect Mistake" and "You and I Should Try Again" followed by the studio album, Starry Skies Open Eyes. In 2016, he released a single entitled "Impetus Epoch".

Silver Jackson's music was featured on an Indigenous Futurism Mixtape. Silver Jackson produced the music for the documentary, Lineage: Tlingit Art Across Generations.

In 2017, Galanin formed a band with Otis Calvin III and Zak Dylan Wass called Indian Agent. The group released the promotional single entitled "Life Keeps On Spinning" from their debut album, Meditations in The Key of Red which was also released in 2017. In 2018, the group released the two-track single entitled "All I Sea".

== Activism ==
Galanin speaks on issues of colonialism and environmentalism. Galanin spoke at the University of North Dakota Writers Conference in 2018.

In 2019, Galanin was one of the 75 artists that were selected to present work in the 79th Whitney Museum of American Art Biennial. Selection by Whitney denotes an artist who is at the "forefront of American contemporary art" and provides them with valuable market exposure and important recognition.

On July 19, 2019, Galanin and three other artists sent a letter to Whitney, asking that their work to be withdrawn from the exhibition. They protested against the presence of the Whitney Board of Trustees vice chair Warren Kanders, who owns the tear-gas producing company Safariland. A day later, they were joined by four additional artists, who also wished to withdraw their artwork. Others joined the protest. Kanders resigned, and the artists decided to allow their work to be exhibited. White Noise, American Prayer Rug, and Let Them Enter Dancing and Showing Their Faces — Shaman, were submitted by Galanin.

In September 2019, Galanin spoke of his intention to withdraw from the exhibition and his ultimate decision to participate. "For me, the reason for both decisions was to fight erasure." In reference to museums, where "our ancestors’ bones" have been held in storage, museums have not been safe spaces for Indigenous people or culture. He says, "But in order to have agency in such spaces, you have to show up. It’s more impactful to engage in conversation than to avoid it."

== Personal life ==
Nicholas Galanin has three children.

== Notable public collections ==
- Alaska State Museum, Juneau, Alaska
- Anchorage Museum at the Rasmuson Center, Alaska
- Art Institute of Chicago, Illinois
- Crystal Bridges Museum, Arkansas
- Denver Art Museum, Colorado
- George Gustav Heye Center, New York
- Hood Museum of Art, New Hampshire
- Humboldt Forum, Berlin, Germany
- Los Angeles County Museum of Art, California
- Museum of Fine Arts, Houston, Texas
- Museum of Modern Art, New York
- National Gallery of Canada, Ottawa, Canada
- Nevada Museum of Art, Nevada
- North American Native Museum, Zurich, Switzerland
- Peabody Essex Museum, Massachusetts
- Portland Art Museum, Oregon
- Princeton University Art Museum, New Jersey
- Vancouver Art Gallery, British Columbia, Canada

== Notable awards and fellowships ==
- 2003 Goldsmiths Commendation London, England
- 2008 Best Experimental Film, ImagineNATIVE Film & Media Arts Festival, Toronto
- 2012 United States Artists Fellowship, USA
- 2013 Eiteljorg Contemporary Art Fellowship
- 2014 Rasmuson Foundation Fellow
- 2017 NACF Mentor Fellow
- 2018 Rasmuson Fellow
- 2018 Rockefeller Foundation Bellagio Center Fellow
- 2019 YBCA 100 Honoree
- 2020 Gwendolyn Knight Lawrence award, The American Academy of Arts and Letters
- 2020 Open Society Foundation Soros Arts Fellowship
- 2023 Joan Mitchell Fellowship
- ArtReview Power 100 List: Most influential people in 2023 in the contemporary artworld
- 2024 Guggenheim Fellowship in Fine Arts

== Filmography ==
=== Short videos ===
| Year | Title | Role | Notes |
|---|---|---|---|
| 2016 | Envoy | Producer | |
| 2020 | Wé tlʼátk áwé át sa.áx̱ - Listen to the land | Writer, Director | |

== Discography ==
=== Studio albums ===
- Silver Jackson (2008)
- Thought I Found Gold (2009)
- It's Glimmering Now (2012)
- Starry Skies Open Eyes (2014)
- Meditations in The Key of Red (2017) (with Otis Calvin III and Zak Dylan Wass, as Indian Agent)
- Ya Tseen - Indian Yard (2021)

=== Extended plays ===
- Moves Like Music (2007)

=== Singles ===
- "Wild Woman" (2011)
- "Perfect Mistake" (2014) (with Iska Dhaaf and OCnotes, as Silver Jackson)
- "You and I Should Try Again" (2014) (with OCnotes, Benjamin Verdoes, and Samantha Crain, as Silver Jackson)
- "Impetus Epoch" (2016)
- "Life Keeps On Spinning" (2017) (with Otis Calvin III and Zak Dylan Wass, as Indian Agent)
- "All I Sea" (2018) (with Otis Calvin III and Zak Dylan Wass, as Indian Agent)
- "All Over Town (Ear Dr.umz Rxndition)" (2019) (with Otis Calvin III and Zak Dylan Wass, as Indian Agent)

=== Guest appearances ===
- Leanne Betasamosake Simpson - "Under Your Always Light - Silver Jackson Remix" from Under Your Always Light (Remixes) (2017)

== Publications ==
- Nicholas Galanin: Let Them Enter Dancing and Showing Their Faces Nicholas Galanin, Merritt Johnson, Negarra A. Kudumu, Erin Joyce. 1st edition 2018, 2nd edition 2020 ISBN 978-1-7321241-0-3

== Concerts ==
- SE Alaska Cannabis Celebration
- Sealaska Heritage Celebration: Red Carpet Concert
- The Heard Museum

== See also ==
- Indigenous music of North America
- List of people from Alaska
