= Ximena Sariñana (album) =

Studio album by Ximena Sariñana
- Released: August 2, 2011
- Genre: electropop
- Length: 43:21
- Label: Warner Bros.
- Producer: Greg Kurstin; Natalia Lafourcade; David Andrew Sitek; Ernesto García

Ximena Sariñana chronology
Mediocre (2008)	Ximena Sariñana (2011)	No Todo Lo Puedes Dar (2014)

Singles from Ximena Sariñana
- 1. "Different" Released: July 25, 2011

Ximena Sariñana is the second studio album released by Mexican musician Ximena Sariñana, released on August 2, 2011, by Warner Bros. Records.

The album marks Sariñana's first studio album to be completely recorded and released in English (with the exception of the song “Tú y Yo”, co-written with Natalia Lafourcade). Both a single and a music video for the song “Different” were released in support of the album.

== Track listing ==
All songs composed by Sariñana. Additional credits are noted:

No.	Title	Writer(s)	Length
1.	"Different"	Tim Armstrong	3:39
2.	"The Bid"	Greg Kurstin	4:23
3.	"Shine Down"	David Andrew Sitek	4:02
4.	"Echo Park"	Kurstin	3:27
5.	"Bringing Us Down"	Baltazar Hinojosa	3:30
6.	"Tomorrow"	Kurstin	3:53
7.	"Lies We Live In"	Sitek	3:44
8.	"Common Ground"	Kurstin	4:05
9.	"Love Again"	Finian Greenall	5:11
10.	"Tú y Yo"	Natalia Lafourcade	4:28
11.	"Wrong Miracle"	Matt Hales	3:18
Total length:			43:32

== Chart performance ==
Chart (2011)	Peak position
US Top Heatseekers (Billboard)	38
