= Ximena Sariñana =

Mexican singer-songwriter and actress

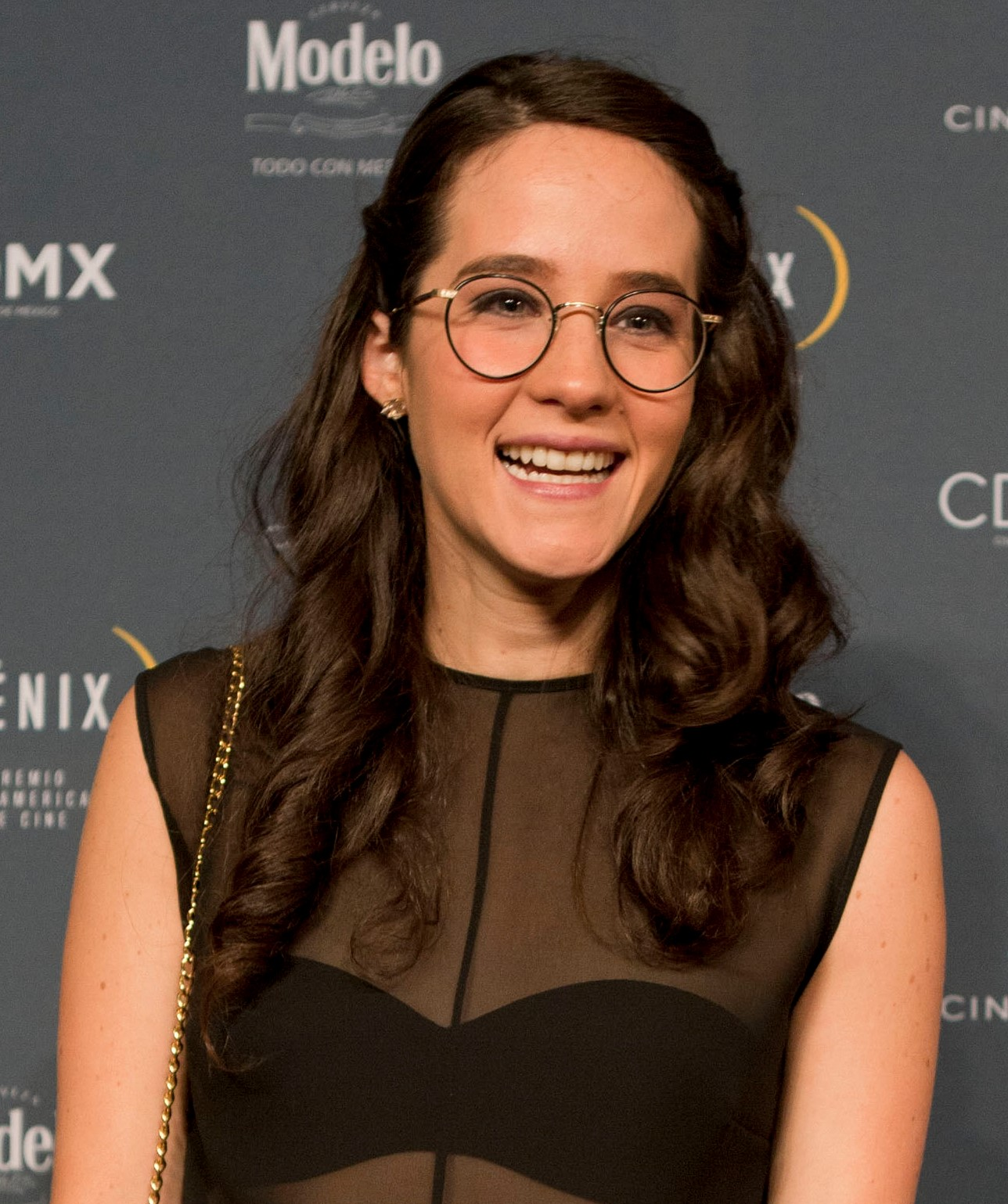
- Sariñana in 2014

Background information
- Born: Ximena Sariñana Rivera; October 29, 1985 (age 40); Guadalajara, Jalisco, Mexico
- Origin: Mexico City, Mexico
- Genres: Pop, rock, Latin pop
- Occupations: Singer-songwriter, actress
- Instruments: Vocals, piano
- Years active: 1994–present
- Labels: Warner Mexico; OCESA Seitrack
- Website: ximenamusic.com

Ximena Sariñana Rivera (Spanish: [xiˈmena sariˈɲana]; born October 29, 1985) is a Mexican singer-songwriter and actress. In 2009, she received critical acclaim and a Grammy nomination for her debut album, Mediocre. Since 2024 she has starred as Ángeles Cruz in the Apple TV+ Spanish-language crime drama Women in Blue (Las Azules).

== Early life ==
Ximena Sariñana was born in Guadalajara, Mexico to director Fernando Sariñana and Spanish screenwriter Carolina Sariñana Rubello and was raised in Mexico City. When she was two years old, Sariñana attended an Ella Fitzgerald concert, claiming this to be the beginning of her interest in music and one of her biggest influences. She soon started listening to other artists such as Paul Simon and Tracy Chapman. She would often be seen singing and dancing and dressed up in costumes as a child. When Sariñana was 7 years old, her neighbor, singer Cecilia Toussaint, suggested she should take singing lessons with her teacher, Ricardo Sánchez, who instructed some of Mexico's biggest talents.

She also took up piano lessons with Hanna Cot. In 1994, Sariñana acted in the film Hasta morir ('Til Death), which was produced by her father. Sariñana was educated at the Academia de Musica Fermatta, a performing arts school and Edron Academy, a private multi-lingual school, both located in Mexico City.

== Career ==
=== 1996–2010: Acting and debut album Mediocre ===
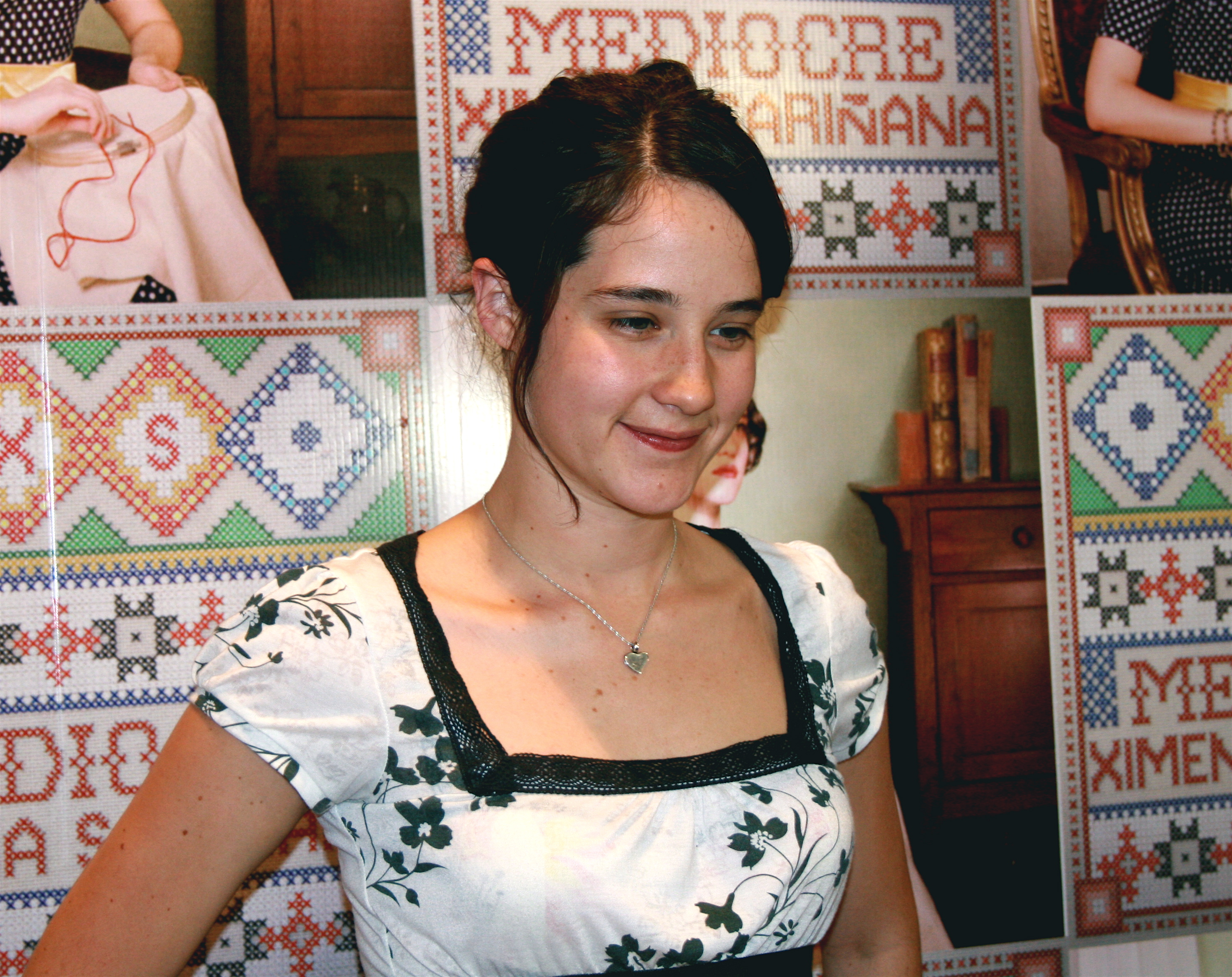
Sariñana in 2008

She began her acting career at 11 as the villain, "Mariela", in the popular Mexican telenovela Luz Clarita, starring Daniela Luján as the main character, Luz Clarita. The following year, Sariñana acted in the telenovela María Isabel as Rosa Isela, with Adela Noriega as the main character, María Isabel. Her final appearance in a telenovela was in the 1998 drama, Gotita de amor (Droplet of Love) as "Enriqueta". Other important movies in which she acted were as Ximena in the 2001 film El Segundo Aire (A Second Chance), Valentina in Niñas Mal (Bad Girls), and Mariana in the 2002 blockbuster film Amar Te Duele; all of which were directed by her father and written by her mother. She also appeared in a short film called De paso in 2005. In 2007, Ximena Sariñana acted in the movie Dos abrazos (Two Embraces) directed by Enrique Begne. Dos abrazos won Sariñana an award for Best Female Actress at the 38th Diosas de Plata of Pecime awards. She also acted in the movie Enemigos íntimos (Intimate Enemies), which was released on DVD in late 2008.

Sariñana showed an interest in music from an early age. At seventeen, after earning a scholarship for a five-week program at the Berklee College of Music, she composed three songs for the soundtrack of the Mexican movie Amar te duele; she also played the part of "Mariana" in the film. Later, she performed as the lead vocalist in Feliz No Cumpleaños (Happy Un-Birthday), a Mexican funk-jazz, pop-rock band that she formed alongside old friends from the Academia de Musica Fermatta. She captivated audiences by singing "El Triste", originally performed by Mexican icon José José, during a televised performance.

Her first solo album Mediocre was released on February 12, 2008, by Warner Music Group. The album was recorded in Buenos Aires, Argentina and Uruguay. Ximena wrote most of the songs on the album and revealed in Venus Zine's Summer 2009 cover story that, "Learning the language of my nationality was something I really wanted to achieve... so I thought maybe if I did a Spanish album it would be a good challenge." On March 28, 2008, Mediocre was certified gold by AMPROFON for selling more than 50,000 copies. Sariñana would later receive further achievement when Mediocre reached platinum status in Mexico for selling more than 80,000 copies.

The music videos for "Vidas paralelas", "Normal", and "No Vuelvo Mas" were all shot in Iceland. "Vidas paralelas" was directed by Pablo Dávila. In late June, British electronic group, Metronomy, stated that they were fascinated with her debut album Mediocre and produced a remix of "La tina". Her music video for the second single, "No Vuelvo Más", was premiered as an exclusive video on July 14, 2008, in MTV Mexico.

The album received critical praise in both Latin America and the United States. It earned a rating of four and a half stars from Rolling Stone magazine in September 2008. The album was also nominated for a Grammy for "Best Latin Rock or Alternative Album" at the 51st Annual Grammy Awards in 2009. She was later nominated for two Latin Grammy awards for Best New Artist and Best Alternative Song but lost to Kany García and Volver a Comenzar by Café Tacuba respectively.

In 2007, she contributed vocals for the song "Valenciana" in the album Extempore by the Ensenada-based nujazz band Kobol. In March 2009, Sariñana was featured as a vocalist alongside her then-boyfriend Omar Rodríguez-López with his solo group on a European tour, which resulted in the live record Los Sueños de un Higado. She also provided vocals on Rodríguez-López's solo albums Xenophanes, Solar Gambling, Ciencia de los Inútiles, Cizaña de los Amores and Tychozorente.

She and Jason Mraz released a Spanish version of Mraz's song "Lucky". The video for the Spanish-version was released to MTV on June 22, 2009. In 2012, she recorded a duet for the song, "Oceanside" by musician Alex Wong for his first solo album, A City on a Lake.

=== 2010–2012: Ximena Sariñana ===
In November 2009, Sariñana was in the studio working on her second album. Her second, self-titled, album consists of English songs written or co-written by her. The album contains one Spanish-language track, called "Tu y Yo". The album was recorded in Mexico City and Los Angeles during 2009 and was completed in early 2011. It was released in North America on August 2, 2011. The album's first single, "Different", was released in June 2011. "Shine Down" was released as a promotional single in summer 2011.

=== 2013–2019: No Todo lo Puedes Dar and "México tiene talento" ===
Her third studio album, No Todo lo Puedes Dar, was recorded in Mexico City and Los Angeles in 2013. The album was released digitally worldwide on November 4, 2014. The album's lead single is called "Sin Ti No Puede Estar Mal". The official lyric video was directed by her brother Sebastian and filmed in Mexico City in August. It was released on her YouTube account on September 18, 2014. The music video for the single premiered on Sariñana's YouTube account on October 1, 2014.

Sariñana also returned to acting, appearing in the short film, Gonzalo, alongside Alfonso Herrera in May 2014. In September 2014, she was revealed as one of the judges for the reality talent show competition, México tiene talento, the Mexican franchise of Got Talent. The program airs weeknights on TV Azteca in Mexico beginning on October 20, 2014.

In 2011, she recorded vocals for the song "Those Were The Days" by the English band McFly while they were on a trip to America to write and record songs for their 6th studio album in a duet with lead singer Tom Fletcher, as well as shot a music video for the song. The songs recorded in that time were shelved, but were eventually brought back out for The Lost Songs. Her song with them was officially released on October 27, 2019, for the album.

On March 1, 2019, she released her album, ¿Dónde Bailarán Las Niñas?, her first studio album since 2014 and her first album since giving birth to her first child, a daughter. The album was commercially successful in Mexico and Latin America. The album was influenced by Sariñana's desire to express her femininity in Mexico's male-dominated recording industry and as a tribute to important female figures in her life, including her mother, infant daughter, and friends.

=== 2020 to present ===
On April 16, 2020, she participated in a charity single for the people of Mexico, titled "Resistiré México". Her fifth studio album, Amor Adolescente, was released in October 2021, after birth of her second child in 2020.

She released a pair of EPs, Ojos Diamante in 2024 and Rompe in April 2025. The EPs are part of a trilogy with the final EP instalment, Las Cosas Simples, due for release in late 2025.

Sariñana returned to acting in 2024 as Ángeles Cruz, one of four leads in Women in Blue (Las Azules), an Apple TV+ crime drama set in Mexico City in 1971. The series returned for a second season in August 2026.

== Personal life ==
Sariñana dated musician and producer Omar Rodríguez-López for 2008 to 2011. Her brother, Sebastian, is a director and toured alongside her as a musician in her band.

In 2016, she married Rodrigo Rodríguez, a film photographer. They have two children, a daughter, Franca, born in early 2018, and a second child born in 2020. To protect her children's privacy, Sariñana does not share their photos on her social media platforms. Sariñana is fluent in Spanish and English and is based in both Mexico City and Los Angeles, California. In 2020, she was announced as the UN Women National Goodwill Ambassador for Mexico. She has spoken against femicide and gender-based violence in Mexico.

== Discography ==
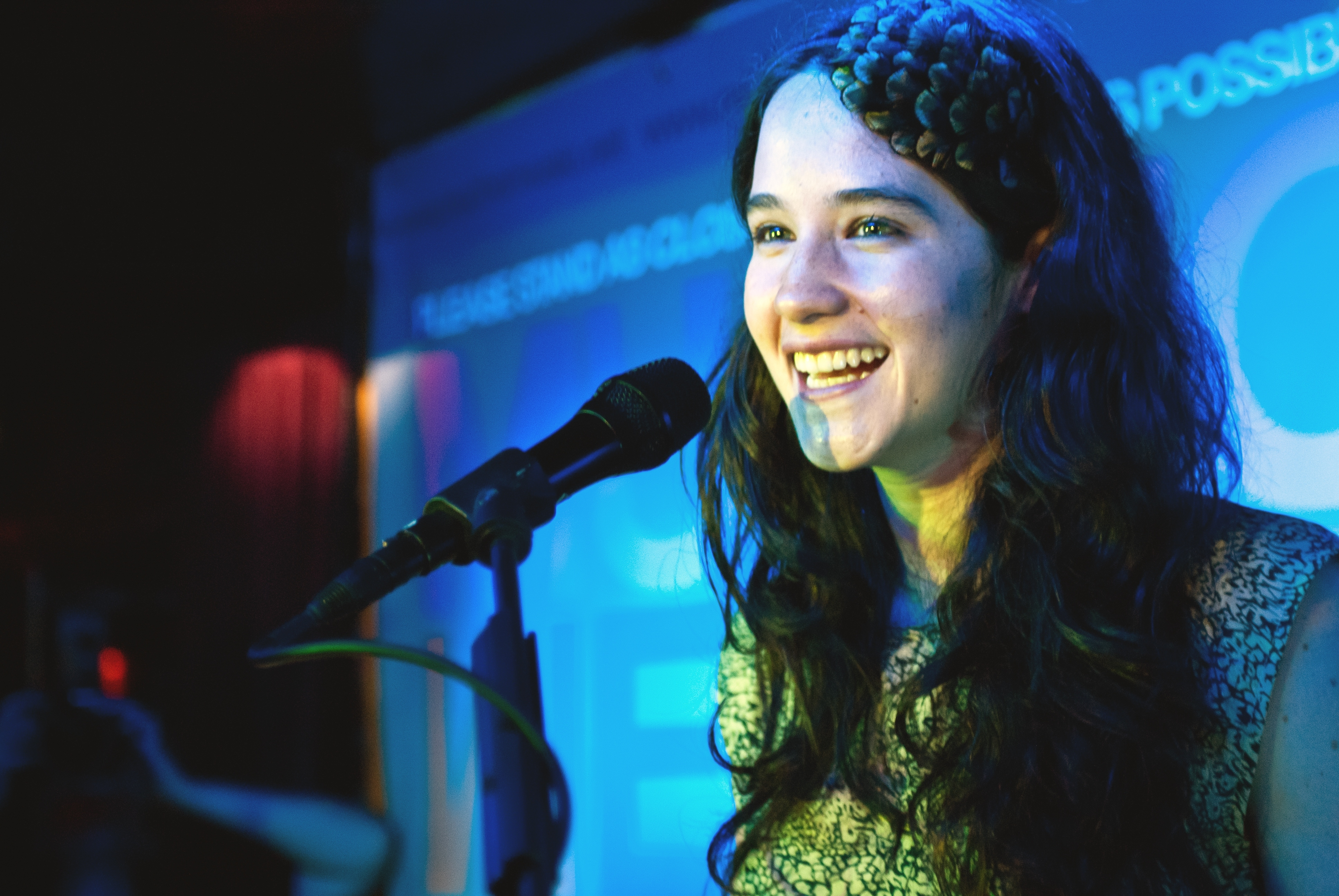
Ximena Sariñana

List of studio albums, with selected chart positions and certifications
Title	Album details	Peak chart positions		
Title	Album details	MEX	US Latin	US Latin Pop
Mediocre	Released: February 12, 2008; Label: Warner Music; Format: CD, digital download	2	38	10
Ximena Sariñana	Released: August 2, 2011; Label: Warner Music; Format: CD, digital download	16	–	–
No Todo Lo Puedes Dar	Released: November 4, 2014; Label: Warner Music; Format: CD, digital download	–	–	–
¿Dónde Bailarán Las Niñas?	Released: March 1, 2019; Label: Warner Music; Format: CD, digital download	–	–	–
Amor Adolescente	Released: October 29, 2021; Label: Warner Music; Format: CD, digital download	–	–	–

=== Singles ===
==== As lead artists ====
List of singles as lead artist, with selected chart positions and certifications, showing year released and album name
Title	Year	Peak chart positions				Album
Title	Year	MEX	MEX Espanol	MEX Ingles	JPN	Album
"Vidas Paralelas"	2008	10	–	–	–	Mediocre
"No vuelvo más"	2008	–	–	–	–	Mediocre
"Mediocre"	2009	–	–	–	–	Mediocre
"Different"	2011	39	–	16	21	Ximena Sariñana
"Echo Park"	2011	–	–	–	–	Ximena Sariñana
"Aire Soy feat. Miguel Bosé"	2011	1	1	–	–	Papitwo
"Sin ti no puede estar tan mal"	2014	19	6	–	–	No todo lo puedes dar
"Mis Sentimientos" feat. Los Ángeles Azules	2014	29	–	–	–	Cómo te voy a olvidar
"Ruptura"	2014	33	10	–	–	No todo lo puedes dar
"La vida no es fácil"	2014	–	13	–	–	No todo lo puedes dar
"¿Qué Tiene?"	2018	10	3	–	–	¿Dónde Bailarán Las Niñas?
"Si Tú Te Vas"	2018	5	2	–	–	¿Dónde Bailarán Las Niñas?
"Lo Bailado"	2019	–	–	–	–	¿Dónde Bailarán Las Niñas?
"Cobarde"	2019	10	2	–	–	¿Dónde Bailarán Las Niñas?
"TBT 4 EVER"	2019	43	11	–	–	Amor Adolescente
"Una vez más"	2020	39	11	–	–	Amor Adolescente
"Nostalgia"	2020	–	–	–	–	Amor Adolescente
"A no llorar"	2021	23	5	–	–	Amor Adolescente
"Mr. Carisma"	2021	–	–	–	–	Amor Adolescente
"El amor más grande"	2021	–	–	–	–	Amor Adolescente
"Diva"	2021	–	–	–	–	Amor Adolescente
"Para siempre...¿?"	2022	–	–	–	–	Non-album single

==== As featured artist ====
Title	Year	Peak chart positions		Album
Title	Year	MEX	MEX Espanol	Album
"Resistiré México" (among Artists for Mexico)	2020	15	4	Non-album single

=== Guest appearances ===
- Extempore by Kobol (2007)
- Los Sueños de un Higado by Omar Rodríguez-López Group (2009)
- Xenophanes by Omar Rodríguez-López (2009)
- Solar Gambling by Omar Rodríguez-López (2009)
- "Lucky / Suerte" by Jason Mraz (2009)
- "Fue Por Ti" by Audifunk (2010)
- Ciencia de los Inútiles by El Trío de Omar Rodríguez-López (2010)
- Tychozorente by Omar Rodríguez-López (2010)
- Cizaña de los Amores by Omar Rodríguez-López (2010)
- Dōitashimashite by Omar Rodríguez-López Group (2010)
- "TQM" by Little Jesus (2016)
- "Those Were The Days" by McFly (2019)
- "Bombas" by Aléman (2022)
- "Pretty Is Dead" by Oh Land (2023)

== Filmography ==
Year	Title	Role	Type
1994	Hasta Morir	Melisa	Movie
1996	Luz Clarita	Mariela de la Fuente	Telenovela
1997	María Isabel	Rosa Isela	Telenovela
1998	Gotita de amor	Enriqueta	Telenovela
2000	Gimme the Power	Valentina	Movie
2001	El Segundo Aire	Ximena	Movie
2002	Amar te duele	Mariana	Movie
2005	De Paso		Short documentary
2006	Amor Xtremo	Mariané	Movie
2006	Monster House	Jennifer "Jenny" Bennett	Spañish-language voiceover
2007	Bad Girls	Valentina	Movie
2007	Año Uña	Additional voices	Movie
2007	Dos Abrazos	Laura	Movie
2007	El Brassier de Emma		Movie
2008	Coraline	Coraline Jones	Spanish-language voiceover
2008	Enemigos Íntimos	Mariana	Movie
2011	Tu Nite con Lorenzo Parro		TV series
2014	Gonzalo	Lucía	Short film
2023	¿Cómo matar a mamá?	Margo	Movie

=== Television appearances ===
Year	Project	Role	Notes
2012	La Voz Mexico...	Advisor	Reality singing competition
2014	México tiene talento	Judge	Reality talent show competition
2020	La Casa de las Flores	Carmela "Carmelita" Villalobos (young)	Comedy-drama series
2024–2026	Women in Blue (Las Azules)	Ángeles Cruz	Apple TV+ crime drama series
