= All U Need Is Mosh =

Studio album by Plastilina Mosh
- Released: August 5, 2008
- Recorded: 2008
- Genre: Alternative rock, dance
- Length: 47:15
- Label: Nacional Records
- Producer: Plastilina Mosh

Plastilina Mosh chronology
| Hola Chicuelos (2003) | All U Need Is Mosh (2008) |

Professional ratings
Review scores
| Source | Rating |
|---|---|
| About.com | 4/5 stars |
| Spin | 3/5 stars |

All U Need Is Mosh is an album released by Plastilina Mosh on August 5, 2008.

== Track listing ==
1. "Toll Free" – 3:21
2. "Jonaz Goes to Hollywood" – 4:04
3. "My Party" – 3:01
4. "Let U Know" – 3:38
5. "Cut the Crap" – 2:48
6. "Arriba Dicembre" – 4:10
7. "Danny Trejo" – 4:00
8. "Going to Mars Bolton" – 4:59
9. "Comeback Bitch" – 4:08
10. "San Diego Chargers" – 4:13
11. "Paso Fino" – 6:09
12. "Pervert Pop Song" – 4:04

== Release and reception ==
The reviews of the album were generally positive, including a four star rating by Tijana Ilich from About.com, who liked the fusion of different styles including rap, pop, punk, dance and metal.

The song "Let U Know" is featured in EA Sports game, FIFA 09 as part of the soundtrack.

The San Diego Reader wrote that "San Diego Chargers" would not supplant "San Diego Super Chargers" as the top song among fans of the National Football League's San Diego Chargers team. The Tucson Weekly praised the song's "spine-tingling, halftime march". Metromix called it "[o]ne of the most charming songs on the album ... a marching, drum-heavy groove." Composer Alejandro Rosso said he was not a Chargers fan but "think[s] that they have a cool team"; he did not want to name the song after the Dallas Cowboys.

== Personnel ==
- Alejandro Rosso – guitar, bass, vocals, keyboard
- Jonás González – guitar, bass, vocals
- Eddie González – guitar, bass, keyboard, backing vocals
- Natalia Slipak – drums, backing vocals
- Milton Pacheco – bass, guitar, backing vocals
- Pedro Martínez — drum loop with flanger on “Danny Trejo”
