= Aldo Chaparro =

Peruvian sculptor

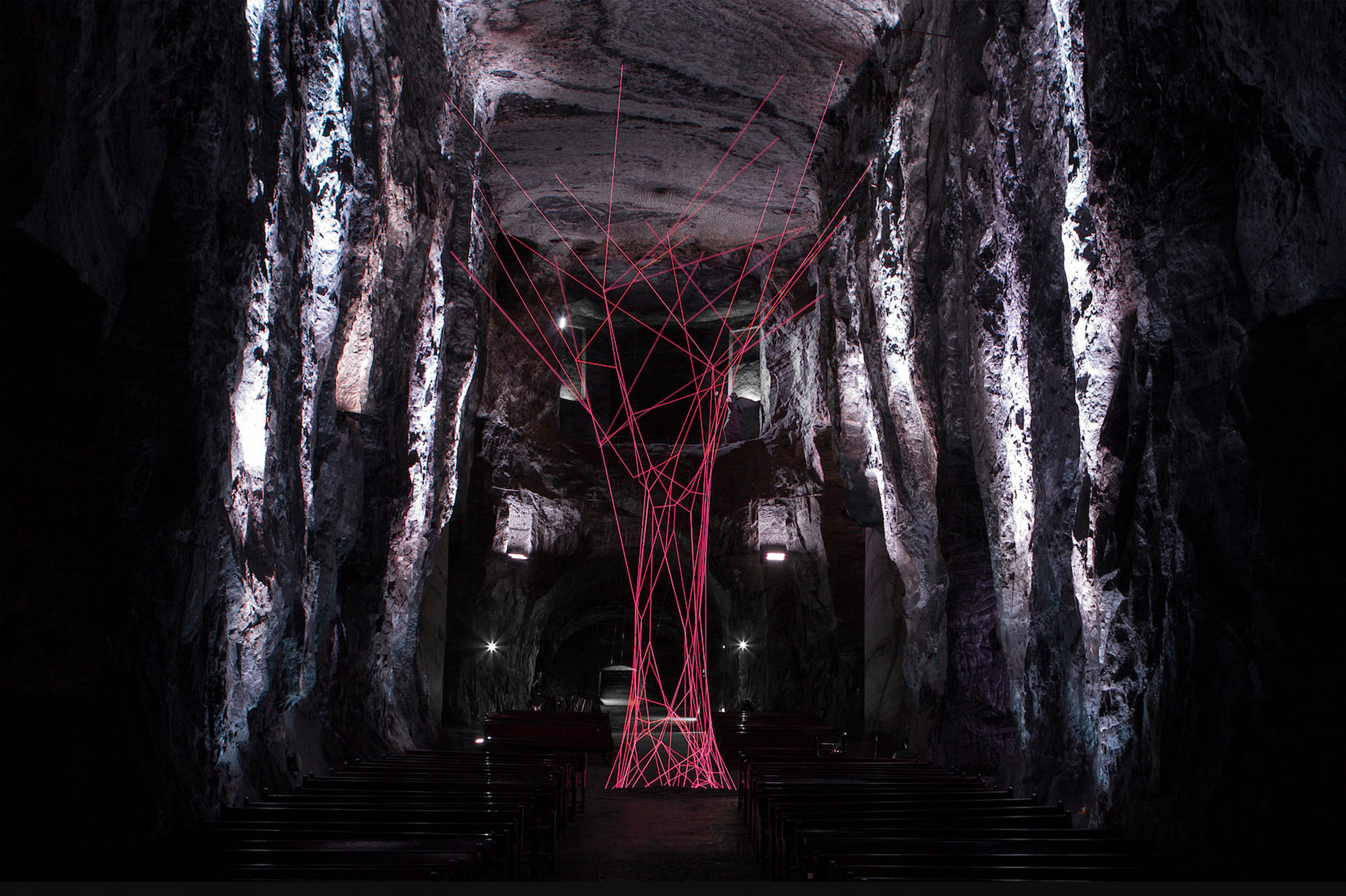
- Born: December 18, 1965 (age 60); Lima, Peru
- Occupation: Contemporary artist
- Website: www.aldochaparro.com

Aldo Chaparro (born December 18, 1965) is a Peruvian sculptor whose artistic work is centered in sculpture and design, best known for his works on stainless steel. He currently lives and works between Mexico City, New York City, and Lima. His work has been published on publications like Bright: Typography between Illustration & Art, Art and Text (edited by Aimee Selby), Art Forum, The Wall Street Journal, and TheSelby.com.

== Art career ==
Aldo Chaparro was born in the city of Lima and graduated from the Catholic University of Peru. Throughout his career, under the influence of artists like Michaelangelo Pistolleto, Robert Morris, and Jorge Luis Borges, reflection and mirroring have been key points of his investigation. His work as an artist includes an active role in the editorial world. As director of Celeste Editorial Group he produced more than 40 publications of contemporary art and fashion from 2000 to 2012, including Celeste and Baby baby baby, two of the most influential art and contemporary culture publications. His work has been collected by Eugenio López (Fundación Colección Jumex), Pierre Huber, Simon de Pury, Helga de Alvear, Douglas Baxter, Domenico De Sole, The Cisneros Fontanals Art Foundation, and The Coppel Collection, among others.

Chaparro’s sculptural practice has been widely discussed in international design and art publications. A 2023 profile in Architectural Digest México emphasized his use of stainless steel to “capture movement through reflective surfaces,” noting how his pieces interact dynamically with surrounding architecture and light. His work has also been featured in The Wall Street Journal, which highlighted the presence of his stainless‑steel forms in the private collection of former Gucci Group CEO Domenico De Sole. Additionally, The Selby documented Chaparro’s Mexico City studio, describing his process as rooted in industrial material experimentation and large‑scale fabrication.

== Collections ==
- The Jumex Foundation/Collection (Mexico)
- The Coppel Collection (Mexico)
- The CIFO – Cisneros Fontanals Art Foundation (Miami – U.S.)
- The Helga de Alvear Foundation (Cáceres – Spain)
- Simon de Pury (London – U.K.)
- Douglas Baxter’s Collection (New York – U.S.)
- Collection Domenico De Sole, Hilton Head, USA.
