= Barracuda (Kinky album) =

Studio album by Kinky
- Released: February 24, 2009
- Recorded: 2008
- Genres: Dance-rock; funk rock
- Length: 43:39
- Labels: Kin Kon; Nettwerk
- Producer: Kinky

Kinky chronology
Reina (2006)	Barracuda (2009)	Sueño de la Máquina (2011)

Barracuda is the fourth studio album by Mexican five-piece band Kinky. It was released on February 24, 2009 through Kin Kon Records. Self-produced with Chico Sonido and Money Mark serving as co-producers, it features a lone guest appearance from Randy Ebright.

The album was supported by two singles: "Hasta Quemarnos" and "Marcha Atrás (Viaje a La Semilla)". According to Billboard charts, "Hasta Quemarnos" peaked at number 35 on the Mexico Español Airplay and number 45 on the Mexico Airplay, while "Marcha Atrás (Viaje a La Semilla)" made it to number 34 on the Mexico Español Airplay and number 42 on the Mexico Ingles Airplay.

== Critical reception ==
Professional ratings
Aggregate scores
Source	Rating
Metacritic	72/100
Review scores
Source	Rating
PopMatters	7/10
Rolling Stone	3/5 stars
Urb	4/5 stars

Barracuda was met with generally favourable reviews from music critics. At Metacritic, which assigns a normalized rating out of 100 to reviews from mainstream publications, the album received an average score of 72, based on four reviews.

Aylin Zafar of Urb praised the album, stating: "whether it's Mark's influence, or Kinky's own growth over the years (or maybe both), this album has universal appeal and its party-ready, rich sound is one that would be a shame to pass up". Evan Sawdey of PopMatters wrote: "this is the sweatiest, most accessible record that the band has yet released, which makes its middle third all the more disappointing given the great songs that surround it". Jody Rosen of Rolling Stone concluded: "Barracuda's expert grooves work best under close study".

== Track listing ==
All tracks are written by and produced by Kinky, except tracks 1 and 8 co-written and co-produced with Chico Sonido, and tracks 3, 5, 6 and 14 co-written and co-produced with Mark Ramos Nishita.

No.	Title	Length
1.	"Hasta Quemarnos"	3:22
2.	"Papel Volando"	3:21
3.	"Those Girls" (featuring Randy Ebright)	3:02
4.	"Avión"	4:05
5.	"Diablo Azul"	2:18
6.	"Masacre Sónica"	3:09
7.	"The Day I Lost the Bests"	2:20
8.	"Marcha Atrás (Viaje a La Semilla)"	3:45
9.	"Tachimaripedóncocongo"	3:06
10.	"Fuego en La Fábrica"	2:52
11.	"Por La Boca"	3:41
12.	"El Tiempo"	3:10
13.	"We Proudly Present"	1:35
14.	"Mis Pasos, Tus Huellas"	3:53
Total length:		43:39
