= Kinky (band) =

Mexican rock band

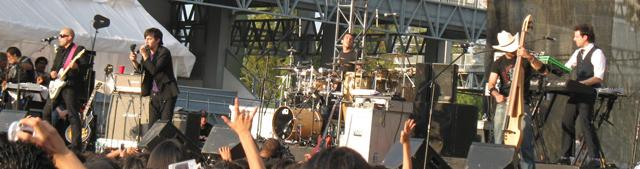
- Kinky performing at Vive Latino 2006

Background information
- Origin: Monterrey, Nuevo León, Mexico
- Genres: Alternative rock, Avanzada Regia, electronic
- Years active: 1998–present
- Labels: Sonic360, Nettwerk
- Members: Gilberto Cerezo; Ulises Lozano; Carlos Chairez; Omar Góngora; Cesar Pliego
- Website: KinkyMusic.com

Kinky is a Mexican rock band, formed in 1998 as part of the Avanzada Regia musical movement and consisting of Gilberto Cerezo, Ulises Lozano, Carlos Chairez, Omar Góngora, and Cesar Pliego. Although a majority of songs are sung in Spanish, some songs contain English lyrics. Kinky were discovered and signed by Sonic360 Records.

== History ==
=== Kinky ===
Their first album, called Kinky, was released in early 2002, co-produced by Chris Allison. It was a success in Latin America, and had some success in the U.S. Their second single, titled "Más", was a success worldwide. "Más" was used in commercials for Nissan and the NBC Mexican Mafia mini-series Kingpin. It was also featured in the video games SSX 3 and Crackdown, and the movies Thirteen and Man on Fire, which featured another song by Kinky, "Field Goal". "Mas" was also used in an episode of CSI: Miami called "Silencer", season 4, episode 13 in which the band appeared at the beginning singing the song and the theatrical trailer of the film 2 Fast 2 Furious. The song titled "Cornman" was used in the PlayStation 3 video game, LittleBigPlanet.

In 2002, they joined Cake, De La Soul, The Flaming Lips, Hackensaw Boys, and Modest Mouse on the Unlimited Sunshine Tour in the U.S - the band also appeared at the Coachella Valley Music and Arts Festival.

=== Atlas ===
In late 2003, the band released Atlas, their second studio album, the most alternative album of the band by far. Singles from Atlas included "Presidente", "Snapshot" and "La Hija del Caníbal".

=== Reina ===
In mid 2006, the band released Reina in an attempt to return to their electronic sound. Singles in the U.S. included "Sister Twisted" and "Uruapan Breaks"; in Mexico and Latin America, the song "A Dónde Van Los Muertos?" became a massive hit. Other Latin American singles included "León" and "Una Línea de Luz". Their cover of Wall of Voodoo's "Mexican Radio" was used in the soundtrack for the video game Need for Speed: Undercover.

=== Barracuda ===
In 2008, Kinky released their fourth studio album Barracuda which was co-produced with Money Mark (Beastie Boys). With the hit songs "Hasta Quemarnos" and "Those Girls", it launched the band on a world tour for two years.

=== Sueño de la Máquina ===
In mid-2012, Kinky's fifth studio album Sueño de la Máquina was released. It was produced and mixed by John King of the Dust Brothers. The first track "Inmovil" was licensed in the racing game LittleBigPlanet Karting.

== Discography ==
=== Studio albums ===
- 2002: Kinky
- 2003: Atlas
- 2006: Reina
- 2008: Barracuda
- 2011: Sueño de la Máquina
- 2014: MTV Unplugged
- 2017: Nada Vale Más Que Tú
- 2022: Fierrro

=== Compilations ===
- 2004: Oye Como Va
- 2006: Rarities
