= Volován =

- Origin: Monterrey, Nuevo León, Mexico.
- Genres: Pop rock
- Years active: 1998–present
- Labels: Universal
- Members: Chalo Galvan; Gera Galvan; Bruno Bressa
- Past members: Jorge Najera; Alejandro Gulmar
- Website: http://www.volovan.com.mx

Volován is a pop-rock Mexican Avanzada Regia band from Monterrey, Nuevo León that was formed in 1998.

== Biography ==
It is internationally well known for its collaborations with the American Andy Chase (Smashing Pumpkins), Eric Matthews (Cardinal). the Englishman Joe Robinson (Badly Drawn Boy) and the Mexican Alejandro Rosso (Plastilina Mosh). The members of the band are Chalo Galvan (guitar and voice), Gerardo Galvan (choirs) and Bruno Bressa (Drums). Their singles and collaborations have been included in important soundtracks like Y Tu Mamá También, La Hija del Caníbal and Amar Te Duele.

Volovan has been nominee in the MTV Video Music Awards and listed in the top 40 of independent artists of 2003 by The New York Times. Its singles “Ella es azul” (album: Ella es azul, 2003) and “Monitor” (album: Monitor, 2006) have been recognized in the Elastic Band Awards for the category of “Best Song”. They are scheduled to participate in the movie The Dreamer. Their song "En Mi Cielo" (from the 2002 self-titled Volovan CD) is part of the soundtrack for the 2006 Mexican drama film Broken Sky (El cielo dividido).

== Discography ==
Studio albums

- Volován (2002)
- Monitor (2006)
- Hogar (2009)
- Sin Aliento (2012)

Compilations

- Ella es Azul (2003) (Only in Japan)
- Monitor Edicion Especial (2007)
