= Kinky (Kinky album) =

Studio album by Kinky
- Released: 26 March 2002
- Recorded: 2001
- Length: 44:14
- Labels: Sonic360, Nettwerk
- Producers: Chris Allison, Kinky

Kinky chronology
| Kinky (2002) | Atlas (2003) |

Professional ratings
Aggregate scores
| Source | Rating |
|---|---|
| Metacritic | 72/100 |
Review scores
| Source | Rating |
| AllMusic | 4/5 stars |
| The Guardian | 4/5 stars |
| Playlouder | 3.5/5 |
| Stylus Magazine | 7.6/10 |

Kinky is the self-titled debut studio album by Mexican group Kinky. It was co-produced and mixed by Chris Allison and released on March 26, 2002, by Sonic360, licensed to Nettwerk for the US and Canada. The most popular song, "Cornman", is part of the soundtrack for the PlayStation 3 video game LittleBigPlanet. Another one of their more popular songs, "Más", is featured in the video game SSX 3 and in the 2004 film Man on Fire. A number of songs from the album were featured in the 2007 video game Crackdown.

== Track listing ==
| No. | Title | Length |
|---|---|---|
| 1. | "Más" | 4:21 |
| 2. | "Soun Tha Mi Primer Amor" | 3:10 |
| 3. | "Great Spot" | 3:20 |
| 4. | "San Antonio" | 3:31 |
| 5. | "Field-Goal" | 1:45 |
| 6. | "Mirando de Lado" | 4:44 |
| 7. | "Sol" | 4:23 |
| 8. | "Ejercicio No. 16" | 4:21 |
| 9. | "Sambita" | 3:58 |
| 10. | "Cornman" | 3:31 |
| 11. | "Anorexic Freaks" | 3:40 |
| 12. | "Tonos Rosa" | 3:34 |
| 13. | "Noche de Toxinas" | 4:17 |

== Personnel ==
- Gilberto Cerezo – guitar, scratching, translation, vocals
- Carlos Chairez – guitar, vocals
- Roberto Galvan Jr. – tamborim
- Roy Galván – congas, cowbell, tambourine
- Omar Gongora – drums, percussion, vocals
- Ulises Lozano – keyboards, programming, vocals
- Pablo Martinez – trumpet
- Camilo Mejia – flute
- Cesar Pliego – bass, vocals
- Eugenio Rosales – trombone
- Luis Ignacio Rosales – saxophone

== Production ==
- Produced by Kinky and Chris Allison
- Mixed by Chris Allison and Sacha Triujeque
- Mastered by Gordon Vicary
