= Hola Chicuelos =

Studio album by Plastilina Mosh
- Released: 22 July 2003
- Genre: Avanzada Regia
- Label: EMI
- Producer: Plastilina Mosh, Jason Roberts

Plastilina Mosh chronology
Juan Manuel (2000)	Hola Chicuelos (2003)	All U Need Is Mosh (2008)

Hola Chicuelos is the third album by Plastilina Mosh, a band from Monterrey, Mexico. It was released in 2003 via EMI.

The album was nominated for a Latin Grammy, in the "Best Alternative Music Album" category.

== Critical reception ==
OC Weekly wrote that "P. Mosh ventures across the sampling galaxy guided by an anarchistic aesthetic that pours upright bass solos, clamorous rawk gratings and Japanese bizarro-pop over some of the most flighty electronica since Odelay-era Beck." The Miami New Times wrote that "the group shows that it's possible to blend disco-era romps, funky and jazzy beats inspired by TV shows, easy-listening grooves, chillout formulas, and ironic rock renditions."

== Track listing ==
1. Cosmic Lelos
2. Peligroso Pop
3. Naranjada
4. Decatlón
5. Pekin Jazz
6. Garret Club
7. Magic Fever
8. Houston
9. Grooveman
10. Celeste
11. Aló
12. Te Lo Juro Por Madonna
13. Keepin' Strong
14. Pinche Stereo Band
15. Shake Your Pubis
16. Enzo
17. Oxidados
18. Outro

== Personnel ==
- Jonaz Gonzalez
- Alejandro Rosso
