= San Diego Super Chargers =

Single by Captain Q.B. and the Big Boys
- Released: 1979
- Recorded: 1979
- Genre: Disco
- Songwriters: Jerry Marcellino and David Sieff
- Producer: Jerry Marcellino

"San Diego Super Chargers" is a disco song that was the fight song of the former San Diego Chargers of the National Football League (NFL). It was written in 1979 during the Air Coryell era of the San Diego Chargers, and it was recorded by a session band dubbed "Captain Q.B. and the Big Boys." New Chargers owners replaced the song in 1989 with a non-disco cover version, but the original version was revived around 2002. The team itself was also sometimes referred to as the San Diego Super Chargers.

== History ==
In the 1970s, the Chargers were owned by Gene Klein, and ticket sales were lagging after losing seasons. In 1979, the team was playing a winning and exciting style under head coach Don Coryell, popularized by its high-scoring offense, nicknamed Air Coryell. Klein started an aggressive marketing campaign that included the song. Klein's son, Michael, brought some friends from the recording industry to a few Chargers games, and he requested the creation of a song based on the Chargers' playing style. "We wanted something that would light up the crowd," said Michael Klein.

The disco song was written in almost a day by David Sieff and Jerry Marcellino, a producer and songwriter for A&M Records who had worked with artists such as Bobby Darin, Diana Ross and Michael Jackson. Studio musicians in Los Angeles collaborated with the vocalist, Los Angeles R&B singer James Gaylen, to record the song. Marcellino, who also produced the song, named the band Captain Q.B. and the Big Boys on a lark. A 7-inch, 45 rpm single of the song was sold in San Diego, and Marcellino received a quarter for each one sold.

Under new Chargers owner Alex Spanos, who acquired the team in 1984, the song was not played for a few seasons. It was brought back in 1989 with a more modern sound. The cover version was recorded by San Diego singer Leonard Tucker and produced by Bo Donovan. The recording was subsequently considered lost after the sound-system room at Qualcomm Stadium, the then-home of the Chargers, was renovated in the late 1990s. Around 2002, the Chargers resumed playing the original version by Captain Q.B. and the Big Boys. The song was played by the Chargers at home games after San Diego scores and victories.

In 2017, the team relocated to Los Angeles and became the Los Angeles Chargers.

== Reception ==
Bernie Wilson, Associated Press (AP) sports writer, wrote in his book, San Diego Chargers, that the song is "perhaps one of the catchiest fight songs of all-time". The New York Times said the song "has a distinctly 1970s roller disco vibe". AP referred to the song as a "dated disco smash", while The Standard-Times called it an "infamous piece of NFL kitsch". Mike Downey of the Chicago Tribune commented that the song "has tortured more eardrums than anything Simon Cowell or Paula Abdul ever judged" on American Idol. The San Diego Union-Tribune called the song "cool, catchyand camp" and "a local anthem" while noting that the 1989 remake was "ill-advised."

The Union-Tribune noted that a generation of fans grew up hearing the song and associate it with the good times and winning during the Chargers' Air Coryell era. Safety John Lynch, a San Diego native, sang the song to his Denver Broncos teammates before a 2004 game in his hometown against the Chargers. "When you've grown up with that, it's part of you," he said. After hearing "San Diego Super Chargers" during a 2005 game, Chargers linebacker Donnie Edwards, another San Diego native, had a flashback to his childhood and attending a Chargers game, watching Dan Fouts throwing to Charlie Joiner.

Although the song was blaring during the 1980 AFC Championship Game, Oakland Raiders receiver Bob Chandler said that "a lot of our guys liked it. I kept tapping my feet to it." The Raiders won the game 34–27. In 1996, Neil Smith of the Kansas City Chiefs said that while he despised the cannon that the Chargers fired after each of their scores, he especially hated their fight song. Prior to the 2007 AFC Championship Game against the Chargers, New England Patriots head coach Bill Belichick said, "I hate that song." He first heard it when he was an assistant coach with the New York Giants in 1980, when the Chargers won 44–7 while Fouts threw for 444 yards. Belichick called the game a "track meet" and recalled Chargers players such as Chuck Muncie, Kellen Winslow, and John Jefferson. "They didn't get through playing that song before they had scored again and they started playing it again. It was 'San Diego Super Chargers,' that's still ringing in my head."

== Other uses ==
Chargers fans played the song in preparation for upcoming games, and some fans even played "San Diego Super Chargers" at their weddings.

The song was known outside of San Diego as well. ESPN football anchors Chris Berman and Tom Jackson sometimes sang "San Diego Super Chargers" when announcing Chargers highlights. Various news sources including ESPN, The Los Angeles Times and the New England Sports Network referred to the Chargers team itself as the "San Diego Super Chargers." Chargers offensive guard Doug Wilkerson, who played under Coryell, said, "We were the 'San Diego Super Chargers.' That song was fast and electric, and so were we."

== See also ==
- San Diego Chargers (song), a song by the band Plastilina Mosh
