= Plastilina Mosh =

Mexican hip hop group

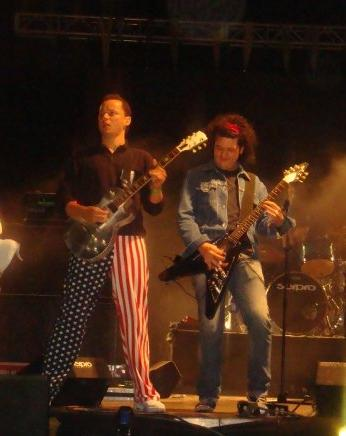
- Alejandro Rosso and Jonás González

Background information
- Origin: Monterrey, Nuevo León, Mexico
- Genres: Alternative rock, pop rock, dance-rock, electronic
- Years active: 1997–present
- Labels: Capitol, Astralwerks, EMI, Nacional Records
- Members: Alejandro Rosso; Jonás González
- Website: https://www.plastilinamosh.com

Plastilina Mosh are a Mexican electronic and alternative rock band formed in 1997. They are part of the musical movement known as Avanzada Regia. Jonás González is the lead singer and guitar player. Alejandro Rosso is more involved with the creative process, providing most of the instrumentation and occasional background vocals.

As of 2018, they have released four studio records. The band has achieved, since the release of their 1997 single-debut 'Niño Bomba', both critical and commercial success. The band often mixes several music styles like rap, dance and rock while often switching between English, Spanish, Italian, French and several other languages in the same song.

== Biography ==
The band was formed in 1996 by Alejandro Rosso and Jonás González. There is a popular myth that the duo met while playing a Super NES at a Wal-Mart in Monterrey, however, Jonás has stated in an interview that this is not true.

Their previous musical experiences were very opposite: González came from a noise rock band called Koervoz de Malta, and Rosso from an avant-garde group called Acarnienses. Jonás liked Sepultura, Soda Stereo, and Mano Negra; whereas Rosso liked Antonio Carlos Jobim, John Coltrane and a varied assortment of classical music.

Back in early 1997, Plastilina traveled to Mexico City, where they recorded the video and the single of Niño Bomba, released under the independent label Tómbola! Recordings, which sold 5000 copies. Then, they started to get attention from the public and the press with their performances. Shortly thereafter, the video started being played on music video channels and radio stations.

They received nominations for Best New Artist in many local awards, and then, the American MTV played their video, making them one of the first rock en español bands video to make a crossover.

On their first visit to Los Angeles, they got the attention of producers like Money Mark (Beastie Boys), The Dust Brothers and Butthole Surfers. As a result, they began to record a complete album.

The recording was an extravagant and complex experience. It was recorded in three stages, each in a different city. The first one was in Los Angeles, with Sukia, a group that had worked previously with the Dust Brothers. From these sessions came the tracks Aquamosh and Monster Truck. The second session was with Jason Roberts, (producer of Cypress Hill's songs). Here, their most famous song: Mr. P. Mosh was recorded. The third one was with the Mexican group Café Tacuba. The production was completed in Arcata, California, with Tom Rothrock and Rob Schnapf.

Aquamosh was finally released in 1998. The first single promoted was Mr. P. Mosh, and it became their most famous song. The '70s actress Lyn May appeared in the video and it peaked at number #1 on the Latin MTV. Other singles promoted were Afroman and Monster Truck. It was recognized as the Record of the Year in Mexico and many other countries, selling 150,000 copies.

The follow-up was Juan Manuel, a more dance-oriented album produced by Chris Allison (who has worked with The Beta Band and Coldplay). After the recording in Monterrey and San Francisco, Plastilina decided to name the record after the name of a friend of the band. The first single was Human Disco Ball and the second was Bassass, both making good rotation into Latin charts.

The third album, a concept album called Hola Chicuelos, was mostly credited to Rosso, who has also produced artists like Jumbo, Volován and Panorama. The band took the idea of working with compositions rather than working as a band. The record consists of 18 tracks, all joined by a similar idea and concept. The most notable singles were Peligroso Pop and Te lo juro por Madonna.

The band took a break in 2005 and 2006. During these years, the band did songs for two movie soundtracks Puños Rosas and La mujer de mi hermano, where Rosso appeared. They also did release Tasty, a compilation of Greatest Hits and B-sides, complemented by the release of a DVD. It was promoted by the single Millionaire, and had a small reference to Tony Blair. The band also performed "Peligroso Pop" for the AIDS benefit album Silencio=Muerte: Red Hot + Latin Redux produced by the Red Hot Organization.

They participated in Los Premios MTV Latinoamérica 2007 performing a remix version of With Love with Hilary Duff.

In 2007, they performed at the inaugural South Padre International Music Festival.

In August 2008, their album All U Need Is Mosh was released. The album track "Let U Know" was included on FIFA 09.

After a few years playing live between 2010 and 2015 they had a sabbatical. Since then, the band has released three singles: "MJLM" in 2017, "JAJAJA" in 2018 and "Conquistador" in 2025.

== Members ==
- Alejandro Rosso (Keyboard, programming, vocals)
- Jonás González (Vocals, guitar)

== Trivia ==
- Their song "Peligroso Pop" is featured as part of the soundtrack of the video game FIFA 07 and the song "Let U Know" is featured as part of the soundtrack of FIFA 09.
- Their songs "Afroman" and "Saint Tropez Is Not Far" are featured in the video game True Crime: Streets of L.A. as part of the in-game soundtrack, though the band is miscredited as "Plastino Mosh".
- "Monster Truck" from 1998's Aquamosh is featured on the soundtrack of the PlayStation game Street Sk8er.
- The band is mentioned in the film Y Tu Mama Tambien.
- They made a cameo in the chilean movie Los Pulentos La Pelicula where they are the presenters for the "Drammy", and performance the song "Piantes" with Los Pulentos.
- Alejandro Rosso produced the album for El Muertho de Tijuana.

== Discography ==
Studio albums

- Aquamosh (1998)
- Juan Manuel (2000)
- Hola Chicuelos (2003)
- Tasty + B Sides (2006)
- All U Need Is Mosh (2008)

EP

- Niño Bomba (1997)

Compilations

- Tasty + B Sides (2006)
- Todo el poder OST (2005)
- Puños Rosas OST (2006)
