= Reina (album) =

Studio album by Kinky
- Released: September 5, 2006
- Genre: Electronica, Rock en Español
- Label: Nettwerk

Kinky chronology
Oye Como Va (2004)	Reina (2006)	Rarities (2006)

Professional ratings
Review scores
Source	Rating
AllMusic	3.5/5 stars
Rolling Stone	3/5 stars

Reina is the third studio album by the Mexican electropop band Kinky. It was released on September 5, 2006 on Nettwerk. Reina is a mixture of many musical styles with electronica, Latin percussion, traditional Mexican accordion, heavy rock electric guitars and bass guitars all occupying the same musical space. Guest singer Colin Hay of Men at Work provides guest vocals on "Monday Killer." "How Do They Do That?" has even drawn comparisons to the 1990s American alternative rock group Morphine.

A music video was released for the lead song, "Sister Twisted", in September 2006. In the music video, a Mexican cowboy, played by David Bernal, does a "twisted" locking and popping

The album received mixed reviews.

Reina was re-released on Feb. 5th, 2008 with two additional tracks: a new remix of "A Donde Van Los Muertos" by Brazilian Girls and a cover of Wall of Voodoo's hit, "Mexican Radio."

== Track listing ==
1. "Sister Twisted" – 3:16
2. "I Say Hey" – 3:06
3. "Una Línea de Luz" – 3:36
4. "Again and So On" – 2:39
5. "How Do They Do That?" – 2:37
6. "León" – 3:47
7. "Monday Killer" – 3:44
8. "¿A Dónde Van Los Muertos?" – 4:17
9. "Lay Back" – 3:47
10. "Nothing Really" – 3:38
11. "Uruapan Breaks" – 2:21
12. "Spin That Wine" – 3:09
