= Si Me Advertí =

1999 single by Zurdok

Single by Zurdok

from the album Hombre Sintetizador
- Released: 20 October 1999
- Genre: Alternative rock; rock music; rock music in Mexico; rock en español
- Length: 3:36
- Label: Universal Music México; Discos Manicomio; Mercury
- Songwriter: Fernando Martinez
- Producer: Peter Reardon

Zurdok singles chronology
"Abre Los Ojos" (1999)	"Si Me Advertí" (1999)	"¿Cuántos Pasos?" (1999)

Music video
- "Si Me Advertí" on YouTube

"Si Me Advertí" (English: If I Warned Myself) is a 1999 song recorded by Mexican rock group Zurdok (including members Jorge Saenz, David Izquierdo and Latin Grammy nominee, Chetes).

The song was produced by Texan recording artist, music producer Peter Reardon (who also produced Zurdok songs; "Abre Los Ojos", "Tal Vez", "Espacio" and "¿Cuántos Pasos?".

== Release ==
"Si Me Advertí" was first released in 1999 by Discos Manicomio/Mercury/Universal sas the second single on their second album Hombre Sintetizador.

The song later appeared on their 2007 Best Of album entitled "Lo Mejor De Zurdok" released by Universal Music Group.

The album album Hombre Sintetizador (including "Si Me Advertí") was reissued in France by Unversal Music.

== Reception ==
In the book, "Desearía que Estuviera en Casa" (I wish he were home) writer Rodrigo Yescas Núñez describes the lyrics ""Well, how bad that you don't see it, you can have me on your side, and I'm still here thinking of you, of everything I gave you" of as genial.

Natalia Cano from Billboard Magazine said of "Si me advertí", with this song they have furthered their cult following within the Latin rock scene.

Coda Music lists "Si me advertí" as Zurdok's top song.

Sloucher Magazine has described the album Hombre Sintetizador as a The "Lost Gem and the song "Si me advertí" as A Classic.

The international platform U discover Music not only listed Hombre Sintetizador as one of the best alvums of 1999, they considered "Si Me Advertí" as one of the songs that defined them as one of the Mexican groups of the decade.

== Music video ==
The music video of "Si Me Advertí" created by Ariel Award winning Mexican film director Fernando Eimbcke and stars French-Mexican actress Yadira Pascault Orozco

The story follows a woman, (played by Yadira Pascault Orozco), as she seeks revenge on a womanizer who has wronged her.

She arrives at a hotel where he is being entertained by a sex worker, then unleashes chaos, hurling furniture and smashing mirrors as she demolishes the room.

After tying him up and forcing him into a car trunk, she leaves the vehicle—with him trapped inside—in an empty parking garage, bringing the story to a satisfying, revenge-filled close.

Embcke adds an inside joke to the visuals: the band members’ individual names are engraved on gold necklace plaques worn by the actors in the clip.
