= Yadira Pascault Orozco =

French Mexican actress and producer

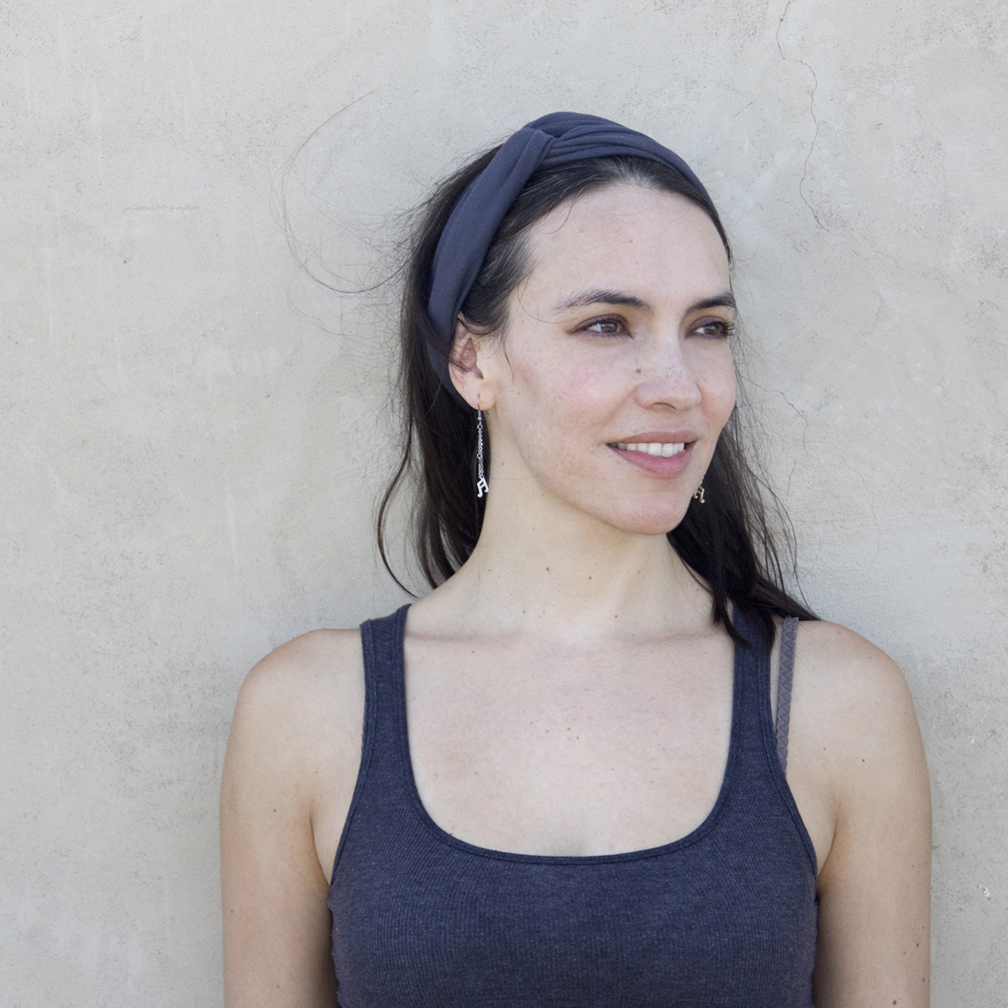
- Orozco in Los Angeles
- Born: Yadira Pascault Orozco
- Occupations: Actress, producer
- Years active: 1995–present
- Board member of: Clementina Films

Yadira Pascault Orozco is a French Mexican film, television, and theater actress and producer based in Los Angeles. She has most recently worked on the hit Telemundo show La Jefa, the Netflix series "Inside the Circle" (based on Jorge Zepeda Patterson's novel, Los Corruptores), and as Mata Hari on "Behind The Myth", an episode of the Emmy Award winning series Expedition Files on the Discovery Channel.

She has appeared in several feature films including; Heroes Game (Juego de Héroes), Between Us (Aquí entre nos) and No eres tú, soy yo, and has performed starring and co-starring dramatic roles in many prime-time episodic television programs for TV Azteca.

== Early work ==
=== Sónicamente, Once En El Cine ===
Yadira Pascault Orozco began her onscreen career as the presenter of the rock n roll program called Sónicamente and was also the host of the cinema culture show El Once En El Cine, both on Canal Once.

=== Si Me Advertí ===
She starred in music video for the song "Si Me Advertí" by Zurdok (considered by Billboard Magazine as one of the Top 50 Spanish language rock bands in history). The video was created by Ariel Award winning Mexican film director Fernando Eimbcke.

=== Cortinillas Canal 5 ===
In 1999, she appeared in two avant-garde in house commercials, Cortinillas, for the Mexican TV station Canal 5 entitled "High Five Girls" and "Cruellas". Both spots were directed by Oscar winner Alejandro González Iñárritu.

== As a producer ==
Pascault Orozco also produces both theater and film. She was an associate producer of the feature films, Nosotros los Nobles (English: The Noble Family), El Cumple de la Abuela, No Eres Tu Soy Yo, Amor de mis Amores, 31 Días, Boogie El Aceitoso Allá en el Rancho, and was the principal producer of the play La Promesa (written by the Soviet playwright Aleksei Arbuzov, that ran at several different locations in Mexico City during 2013.

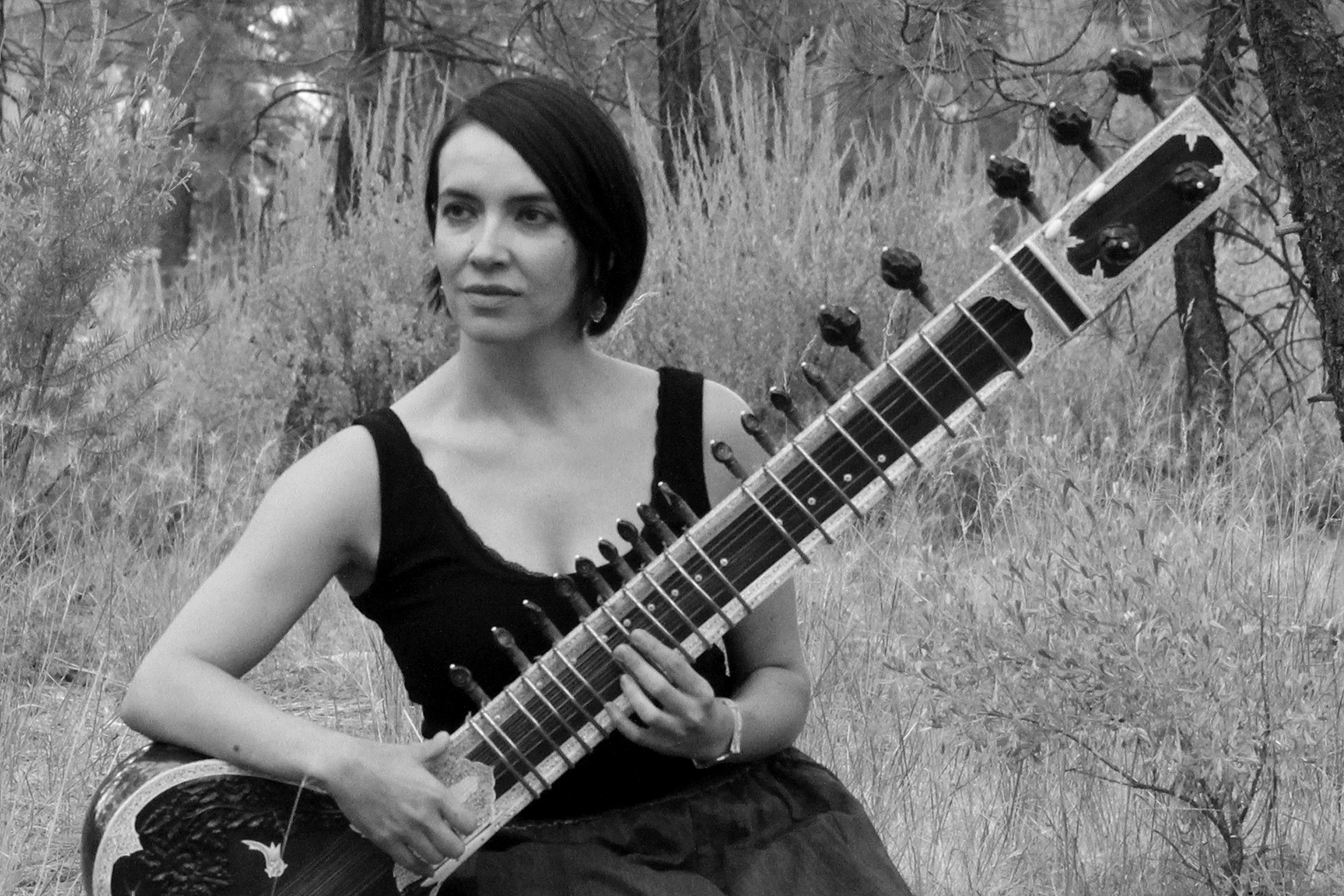
Yadira Pascault Orozco performing on sitar.

Two of her films are among the top ten all-time Mexican box office successes in history. In 2013, the comedy feature Nosotros los Nobles (The Noble Family), of which she was an associate producer, rose to the number one ranking after taking in $165.3 million Mexican pesos, rising above even the revered Arráncame la vida (2008; $110 million Mexican pesos) and Y Tu Mamá También (2000; $123 million pesos). In 2010, after only a month in national cinemas, the romantic comedy No Eres Tu Soy Yo (of which Pascault Orozco was both an associate producer and an actress) collected more than $100 million Mexican pesos and became the fifth highest-grossing film in the history of Mexican cinema, according to a report published by the National Chamber of the Cinematographic and Videogram Industry.

== In popular culture ==
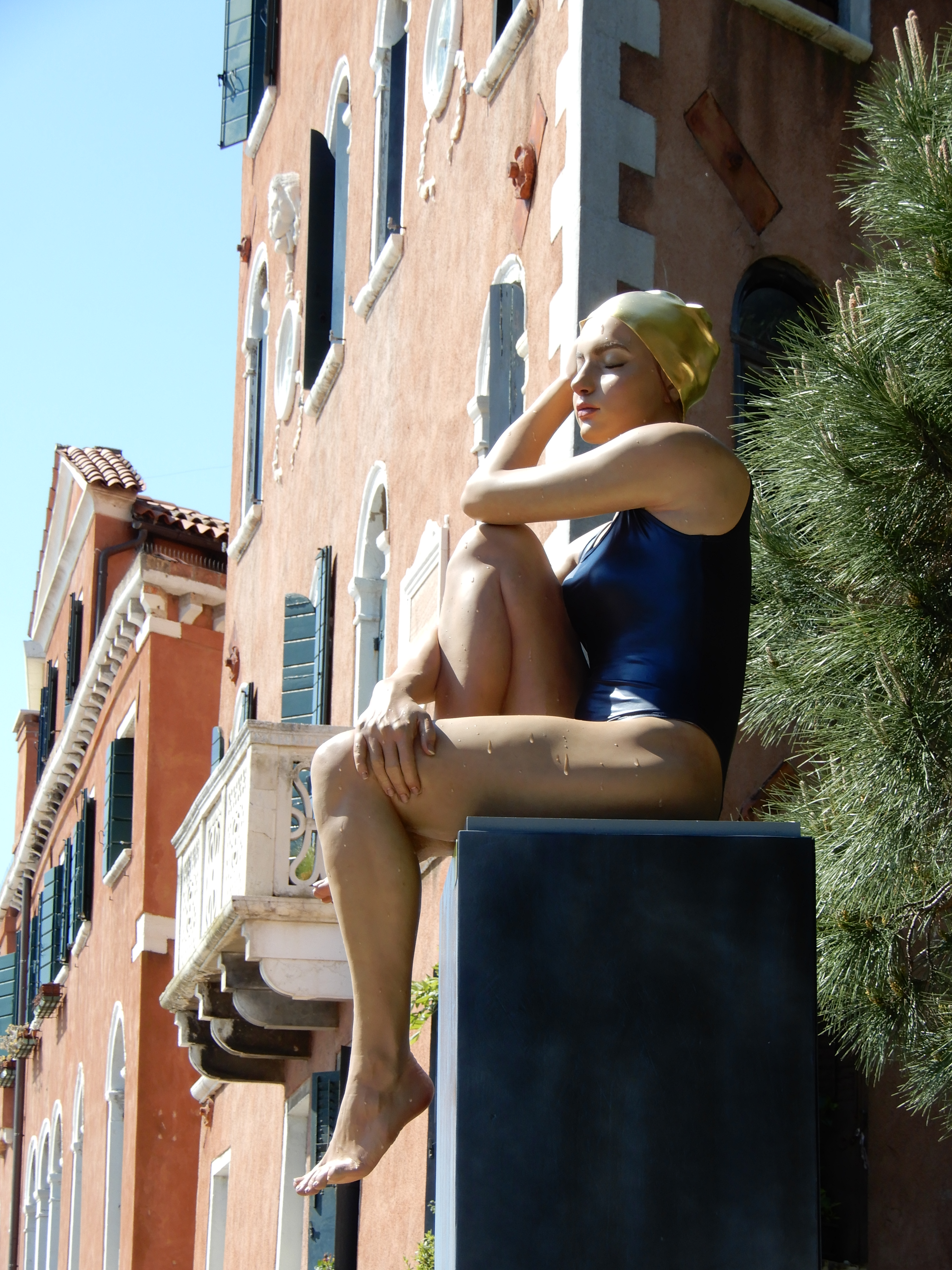
Hyperrealistic sculpture “The Midpoint” by Carole A. Feuerman (portraying Yadira Pascault Orozco), at Giardino della Marinaressa part of the 2017 Venice Biennale

Orozco has been a reference for works of modern visual art and also literature. In 2016, the Mexican muralist Julio Carrasco Bretón depicted her face on a large scale wall painting created specifically for Hotel El Parque México in Mexico City. The lead character "Violeta" in the Mexican writer Xavier Velasco's novel, Diablo Guardián, was largely inspired by Pascault Orozco's personal character and speech patterns. The book won the Premio Alfaguara book award in 2003.

After attending the opening of Perception, an exhibition by the New York contemporary artist Carole Feuerman at KM Fine Arts in Los Angeles, in 2016 the artist invited Pascault Orozco to New York to become the subject of a full-sized hyper-realist sculpture.

The finished result, a life-sized sculpture entitled, The Midpoint, portraying Yadira Pascault Orozco (wearing a one-piece swimsuit and a bathing cap) made its debut in Feuerman's 2017 solo showing at Giardino della Marinaressa, part of the 2017 Venice Biennale. Later in 2020, the sculpture was a focal point of an arts debate about the piece and its place in Tübingen, Germany involving mayor Boris Palmer and prominent members of the arts and culture community.

== Filmography ==
=== Film ===
Year	Title	Role	Notes
2005	Bolas Chinas	Natasha The Stripper	Directed by: Alejandro Ezpeleta
2006	Luciana	Doris	Directed by: Juan Pablo Cortés
2010	No eres tú, soy yo	Dueña del perro	Directed by: Alejandro Springall
2012	Aquí Entre Nos		Directed by: Patricia Martínez de Velasco
2013	Nosotros los Nobles (The Noble Family)	Associate producer	Directed by: Gary Alazraki
2016	Juego De Héroes	Graciela	Directed by: Pedro Alvarez Tostado
2018	Justice for All	Cielo	Directed by: Hector Echavarria
2018	Poppies	Mary	Directed by: Myles Yaksich
2021	Introducing Jodea	Isabella	Directed by: Jon Cohen
2024	Do Not Disturb	Isla	Directed by: Hugo Ortiz Clemens
2026	The Elephant in the Room	Celia	Directed by: Jeffrey Prosser

=== Theater ===
Year	Title	Role	Notes
2010	Las Mascaras de Sor Juana	Sor Juana	Directed by: Miguel Sabido
2013	La Promesa (actress, producer)	Protagonista	Directed by: Luly Rede
2018	I Was Born To Be	Gloria	Directed by: John Fingal O'Donnell
2019	Vote For Me	Rada	Directed by: John Fingal O'Donnell

=== Television ===
Year	Title	Role	Notes
1999-2005	Sónicamente	Presenter	Directed by: Jorge Villela
2008-2009	El Once En El Cine	Presenter	Directed by: Daniela Paasch
2025	La Jefa (ep. 72-27)	DEA	Directed by: Maurico Meneses (Telemundo)
2026	Inside The Circle (S1E1)	Conductora Noticiero R4	Directed by: Alejandro Lozano
