= Raquel Pankowsky =

Mexican film and television actress (1952–2022)

- Born: July 10, 1952; Mexico City, Mexico
- Died: March 28, 2022 (aged 69); Mexico City, Mexico
- Occupation: Actress
- Known for: Un gancho al corazón (2008), and Que pobres tan ricos (2013).

Raquel Pankowsky (July 10, 1952 – March 28, 2022) was a Mexican Jewish film and television actress.

== Early life ==
Born in Mexico City, Mexico, she grew up in Narvarte, Mexico City. Pankowsky never married and did not have children. She was the daughter of Isabel and José Pankowsky, who divorced when Pankowsky was 6 years old. Her father died when she was 19, and her mother when she was 25.

A lifelong smoker, she began smoking when she was 11 years, she was diagnosed with COPD and faced with the likelihood that she would develop pulmonary emphysema if she did not give up smoking. She could not imagine herself not smoking, and was having a difficult time giving it up and turned to an addiction psychiatrist. After she successfully quit smoking, during an interview she said the best thing she's done in her life was to give up smoking.

== Career ==
Pankowsky began acting in high school. Pankowsky was an extra in the theater production of Hat Full of Rain (Un sombrero lleno de lluvia) and met Luis Gimeno who was also in the play. At that time Gimeno was the director of the school of the National Association of Actors (ANDA), he encouraged her to study acting there.

In 2005 Pankowsky's role as Marta Sahagún, Mexico's First Lady and wife of President Vicente Fox, in El privilegio de mandar opened many doors for her and "gave her the greatest success of her career".

In 2016 she participated in the Bellas Artes reading promotional program “Leo… luego existo” (I read, therefore I exist) at the International Book Fair in Arteaga, where she read from the book "La culpa es de los Tlaxcaltecas " by Elena Garro, which encourages people of all ages to read.

== Filmography ==
=== Telenovelas ===
Telenovela roles
Year	Title	Roles	Notes
2018	José José, el príncipe de la canción		
2017	Papá a toda madre	Esperanza Félix	
2017	El bienamado	Concordia Briseño	
2013-2014	Qué pobres tan ricos	Isela Blanco	
2013	Corazón indomable	Cira	
2012	Miss XV	Griselda	
2012	Cachito de cielo	Coca Obregón	
2010-2011	Para volver a amar	Sra. de Pimentel	
2010	Zacatillo, un lugar en tu corazón	Sonia	
2008-2009	Un gancho al corazón	Bernarda	
2003-2004	Alegrijes y rebujos	Consuelo Márquez	
2001-2002	El juego de la vida	Bertha De la Mora	
2001	Carita de ángel	Honoria	
2000-2001	El precio de tu amor	Meche	
2000	La casa en la playa		
1999	Por tu amor	Dr. Obregón	
1998-1999	Camila	Gloria	
1997	Esmeralda	Juana	
1996	La sombra del otro		
1994-1995	Caminos cruzados	Inés	
1992-1993	Ángeles sin paraíso	Brígida	
1992	Carrusel de las Américas	Professor Matilde Mateuche	
1991-1992	Al filo de la muerte	Adela	
1991	Cadenas de amargura	Inés Blancarte	
1989-1990	Carrusel	Professor Matilde Mateuche	
1988	Amor en silencio	Sirvienta de Mercedes	
1987-1988	Victoria	Hortensia	
1987	Rosa salvaje	La Tacones	
1981-1982	Juegos del destino	Teresa	

=== Television ===
Television roles
Year	Title	Roles	Notes
2016	Los González	Doña María González	Several episodes
2013	As the Saying Goes (Como dice el dicho)		1 episode, 2013
2009	Killer Women (Mujeres asesinas)	Elena 'Nena' Quiroz Montalbo	1 episode, 2009
2009	Los simuladores		1 episode, 2009
2009	Hermanos y detectives		1 episode, 2009
2008	La rosa de Guadalupe	Clotilde	1 episode
2007	Vecinos	Tía Maty	1 episode
2007	A Family of Ten (Una familia de diez)	Conchita	1 episode
2007	The Plush Family (La familia P. Luche)	Directora	1 episode
2005-2006	The Privilege to Rule (El privilegio de mandar)	Martha Según	Several episodes
2005	Así es Gilberto Gless	Herself	1 episode
2005	Incognito	Martha Según de Fox	1 episode
2003	Your Love Story (Tu historia de amor)	Ana	Several episodes
2002-2004	Desde Gayola	Martha Según de Fox	Several episodes
1994-2003	Women, Real Life Cases (Mujer, casos de la vida real)		18 episodes

=== Film ===
Film roles
Year	Title	Roles	Notes
2011	La cebra	Señora Martina	
2010	No eres tú, soy yo	Agente de Bienes raíces	
2007	My Mexican Shivah (Morirse está en hebreo)	Esther	
2006	Así del precipicio	Raquel	
1991	El jugador	Juanita	
1990	Imagen de muerte		
1989	El cornudo soy yo		
1989	Señoritas a disgusto	Rosita Rivero	
1988	Las psiquiatras ardientes		
1983	Amityville 3-D	Sensory Woman	
1978	La plaza de Puerto Santo	Hija de Carmona	
1974	El mexicano feo		

=== Stage ===
- Humo, amo y cosas peores (2010)
- Driving Miss Daisy (2013)
- Los Locos Adams (2015)
- El secuestro de la Cuquis (2015)

== Awards ==
- Premios TVyNovelas - Nominated for Best Leading Actress for Papá a Toda Madre in 2018
- Presea Luminaria de Oro - Career achievement award (Reconocimiento por Desempeño) in 2014
- TV Adicto Golden Awards - Awarded Best Leading Actress for Cachito de cielo in 2012
- Premios Calendario de Oro - Best Comedy Actress in 2007
