= Sónicamente =

- Sónicamente presenter, Yadira Pascault Orozco
- Genre: Rock en español and Rock N Roll
- Created by: Jorge Villela
- Directed by: Jorge Villela
- Presented by: Yadira Pascault Orozco
- Country of origin: Mexico
- Original language: Spanish
- No. of episodes: 200

Production
- Executive producer: Arturo Ayala Torres
- Editor: Rafael Rivera Goyenechea
- Running time: 30 minutes (including commercials)

Original release
- Network: Canal Once (Mexico)
- Release: 6 September 2001 – 17 August 2008

Sónicamente is a music program on Canal Once (Mexico) focusing primarily on Mexican rock, Rock en español, Rock N Roll and Urban culture. It aired nationally in Mexico from 2001 until 2008. It was created and directed by Jorge Villela and was presented by Yadira Pascault Orozco.

During the course of the program, many Mexican and international musical artists were interviewed. They also often performed live to air at Canal Once studios in Mexico City. Among the invitees were; Molotov, Jaguares, Café Tacuba, Zoé, El Tri, Julieta Venegas, Zurdok, Jumbo, La Gusana Ciega, Santa Sabina, La Lupita, Control Machete, Víctimas del Doctor Cerebro, Ely Guerra, Maldita Vecindad, Los Esquizitos, Lucybell, Titán, Panteón Rococó, Lost Acapulco y La Barranca.

After its first year of relatively low-expense production, in late 2001 Canal Once granted Sónicamente a 48% increase in overall budget to improve the technical quality of the program.
