= María Amparo Escandón =

American film producer

- Born: June 19, 1957 (age 69); Mexico City, Mexico
- Occupations: Novelist, short story writer, creative director, screenwriter, film producer, professor
- Spouses: Luis Eduardo Gil; Benito Martínez Creel (−2006); Pedro Haas
- Children: 2

María Amparo Escandón (born June 19, 1957) is a Mexican-born American novelist, writer and film producer. Her work is known for addressing bi-cultural immigration experience of Mexicans. Her work has been translated into over 21 languages.

== Life and education ==
Her father, Julio Escandón, was a contractor in the construction business; and her mother, María Amparo de Escandón, headed professional training for the Labor Department in Mexico. María is the eldest of four children and spent her childhood in Mexico City, jumping from one elementary school to the next due to disciplinary issues. At the age of thirteen, she was sent to study in rural Minnesota, near the pig farms, where she discovered the English language. Upon her return to Mexico, she read One Hundred Years of Solitude by Gabriel García Márquez, and under his influence, initiated her career as a narrator.

Escandón studied Communications at Universidad Anáhuac and Universidad Nuevo Mundo in Mexico City from 1977 to 1982. She was briefly married to Luis Eduardo Gil, and later immigrated to the United States where she co-founded Acento with Benito Martínez Creel, who would become her second husband. She went back to studying but in the arena of visual arts. She took Ceramics at the Otis College of Art and Design in Los Angeles, California, from 1983 to 1985. After living in the US for ten years and having published a number of short stories in Spanish, in 1993, she entered a creative writing workshop at UCLA (University of California Los Angeles) Extension, to learn how to write in English. Just a year later, she was invited to become part of the teaching staff.

Escandón has two children (Zooey and Iñaki) by her ex-husband, Benito Martínez-Creel (divorced in 2006). She currently lives in Los Angeles, California and Mexico City with Pedro Haas.

== Literary career ==
María Amparo Escandón, an instant New York Times best selling author, developed her career in the early 1970s during the Latin American Boom. Her first published short story appeared in the Mexican literary journal Plural in 1973 when she was sixteen. The works of masters Julio Cortázar, Octavio Paz, Carlos Fuentes, Juan Rulfo, Pablo Neruda, Mario Benedetti, Gabriel García Márquez, Alejo Carpentier, and others influenced her work. Convinced that men had better opportunities to succeed as writers than women, she wrote her first short stories from the male perspective. It was until she moved to Los Angeles in 1983 when she discovered women writers like Toni Morrison and Sandra Cisneros that she shifted her perspective and focused on women's issues and the Mexican American experience in the US.

Living in California, in 1999, she wrote her first novel, Esperanza's Box of Saints published by Simon & Schuster, and its Spanish version, Santitos, published by Plaza & Janés, now Random House. Her second novel, González & Daughter Trucking Co., was published in English by Three Rivers Press in 2005 and in Spanish by Vintage Español under the title Transportes González e Hija. It is set in a Mexican prison and the roads of America. It deals with women's relationships, guilt, crime, passion, corruption and forgiveness in a context of a hybrid border culture. In this novel Escandón approaches her personal relationship with her own father who died of a heart attack three days after she finished writing her manuscript. She addresses paternal possessiveness and gender double standards in the Mexican society. The novel also reflects a linguistic reality in bicultural California exploring the vernacular merge of Spanish and English (Spanglish), as well as different sub-culture lingoes.

Escandón's third novel, L.A. Weather, is a New York Times best seller and a Reese's Book Club pick. It follows the Alvarado family as they wrestle with betrayal against a backdrop of impending evacuations during a season of drought and fire.

Aside from teaching Creative Writing at UCLA Extension, Escandón has been an advisor at the Sundance Screenwriters Labs in Mexico and Brazil, as well as at the Fundación Contenidos de Creación Fiction Workshops in Barcelona, and participates as a mentor for young upcoming minority writers at the PEN Center's Emerging Voices Program. Additionally, she is one of the original members of Frijolywood, the official Mexican Filmmakers' association in Hollywood.

== Film career ==
Escandón wrote the screenplay Santitos, based on her novel Esperanza's Box of Saints at the Sundance Screenwriters Lab. The film was produced by John Sayles and directed in Mexico by Alejandro Springall. The film was the third largest grossing Mexican film in Mexico in 1999 and was successfully released in Spain and Latin America in January 2000. To date, the film has received awards in 14 film festivals around the world, such as the Latin Cinema Award at the Sundance Film Festival, Best Film at the Guadalajara Film Festival, Best Actress at the Latin American Film Festival in Lima, Peru, Best Film at the Los Angeles Latino Film Festival, Best Actress at the Festival International du Film d'Amiens, Best Film at the Santa Fe International Film Festival, Grand Jury Award at the Cartagena International Film Festival, Best Opera Prima at the Heraldos Awards in Mexico, Special Jury Award at the Rencontres Cinémas de Toulouse, and Best Opera Prima by the Critique Française (Découverte de la Critique Française).

Escandón has recently completed the screenplay based on her novel González & Daughter Trucking Co. and the film is currently in active development at her own production company.

== Advertising career ==
Escandón began working as a copywriter in 1982 at Gutiérrez Silva in Mexico City while studying her degree in Communications. She moved to Los Angeles in 1983 to start Acento, today one of the nation's top 20 full-service agencies serving the U.S. Latino and Latin American markets in areas like creative, media planning and buying, production, direct marketing, public relations, grassroots, promotions, event marketing and entertainment. After selling Acento in 2009 and complying with a three-year non-compete, she founded Leagas Delaney America in 2012, a joint venture with Leagas Delaney LTD, a London-based advertising agency owned and operated by Tim Delaney and Margaret Johnson OBE.

== Wings for the Soul ==
In addition to her writing, film and advertising career, Escandón launched the first ever prison book club and author series in 2005, Wings for the Soul, at the California Institution for Women in Corona, CA, made possible by the Women and Criminal Justice Network. Wings for the Soul gave inmates the opportunity to meet four times a year to read and discuss a particular book with the author. The books were primarily written by women and were mainly about women.

== Published work ==
- Esperanza's Box of Saints (Santitos, in Spanish) (Simon & Schuster) (1998)
- González & Daughter Trucking Co. (Three Rivers Press) (2005)
- Las Mamis, Favorite Latino Authors Remember their Mothers, Edited by Esmeralda Santiago and Joie Davidow (Knopf) (2000)

== Filmography ==
- Santitos (1997) (Screenwriter, Actress)
