= Pride of the Bimbos =

1975 novel by John Sayles

- First edition cover
- Author: John Sayles
- Publisher: Little, Brown & Co.
- Publication date: July 1, 1975
- ISBN: 1-615-57640-1

Pride of the Bimbos is the first novel by American author and filmmaker John Sayles, published in 1975.

The book is about a dwarf who is a traveling baseball player who dresses in drag and plays local teams. The baseball is always played without comedy and the traveling team (the Bimbos) almost always wins. As the book unfolds the reader learns about the midget named Pogo in flashbacks. At one time he was a gang leader, and another time he was a detective. Throughout the book, a man who is as tall as Pogo is short tries to find him to do him harm.

New York Times reviewer Raymond Sokolov called the book "an oddly unsettling satire of American machismo". Kirkus Reviews said "it might be the unlikeliest book you ever thought to like", with its bizarre plot and "hugely funny scenes". They concluded "Sayles is a writer with more talent in the knuckle of his little finger than we've met in many a long season--full of spit and humor and affection." In 1988, Alida Becker of the Chicago Sun-Times called the book a "rollicking examination of masculine self-esteem". Randall Kenan, writing in 1991 in The Nation, called the book a "novel by turns hilarious and poignant", showing Sayles's "highly individual vision."
