= Efecto Dominó =

Studio album by Chetes
- Released: April 15, 2008
- Genre: Rock
- Length: 43:10
- Label: EMI Music
- Producer: Chetes

Efecto Dominó is an album by Chetes, released on April 15, 2008. The album received a Latin Grammy Award nomination for Best Rock Solo Vocal Album.

== Track list ==
All tracks are written by Chetes.

No.	Title	Length
1.	"Efecto Domino"	4:10
2.	"Fuera de Lugar"	3:36
3.	"Querer" (Written by Chetes, Ken Coomer, and Charlie Brocco)	3:38
4.	"Quédate"	3:32
5.	"La Primera Vez"	4:09
6.	"Destino"	4:12
7.	"Canción Optimista"	2:29
8.	"Sobrenatural"	3:09
9.	"Blues Del Diablo"	3:18
10.	"Ahora"	3:17
11.	"Como Lo Siento"	9:00

== Musicians ==
- Chetes: vocals, acoustic guitar, bariton guitar, nylon string guitar, electric guitar, resonator guitar, optigan, harpsichord, banjo on "La primera vez", string arrangements for "Ahora", toy piano, stylophone, rhodes, mellotron, piano
- Ken Coomer: production, drums except on "Sobrenatural" and "Blues del Diablo", percussion, glockenspiel on "Quedate", Walkie Talkie Radio on "La primera vez"
- Fred Eltringham: drums on "Sobrenatural" and "Blues del Diablo"
- Peter Stround: electric guitar, nylon string guitar on "Querer"
- Audley Freed: electric guitar
- Tim Marks: bass
- Rami Yaffee: organ, piano, wurlitzer, harmonium, chamberlin strings on "Destino", vibraphone on "Como lo Siento"
- Chris Carmichel: cello
- Keith Gattis: pedal steel guitar
- Scotty Huff: trumpet, flugelhomy and whistling on "La primera vez"
- Sarah Hays: backup vocals on "Blues del Diablo"
- Charlie Brocco: production, backup vocals on "Blues del Diablo"
- Jonathan Brocco: saxophone on bonus track of “Como Lo Siento”
