= Alejandro Springall =

Mexican film director and producer

Alejandro Springall (born 1966) is a Mexican film director and producer. His debut film Santitos (1999) launched his filmmaking career. His other feature films include My Mexican Shivah (2006), No eres tú, soy yo (2010), and Sonora (2018).

In 1966, Springall was born in Mexico. He studied at the London Film School and worked for the BBC and Channel 4. Upon returning to Mexico, he aided in the production of Cronos (1992) and Dollar mambo (1993). He made the Spanish subtitles to John Sayles's Men with Guns (1997) as well as played a minor acting role. In 1996, he directed his first feature film, Santitos (1999), written by María Amparo Escandón and co-produced with Sayles. It won Special Recognition for Latin American Film at the Sundance Film Festival.

In 2003, Springall produced and directed the grand concert of Chavela Vargas at Carnegie Hall, New York.

In 2016, it was announced Springall would direct Sonora (2018), produced by Sayles and Bertha Navarro, that centered around 1920s migration across El Camino del Diablo and racism. In 2021, he made his debut as a theatrical director with Sensualidad, a project at the London Film School based on Alberto Gout's 1951 film and which he collaborated with Mónica Dionne.

- Santitos (1998)
- Morirse está en hebreo (My Mexican Shivah) (2006)
- No eres tú, soy yo (It's Not You, It's Me) (2010)
- 200 años de mexican@s en movimiento (2010)
- The Devil's Highway (2018)

== Producer, co-producer and line producer filmography ==
- Cronos (La Invención de Cronos) (1993)
- Dollar Mambo (1993)
- Someone Else's America (1994)
- De tripas, corazón (1995)
- Santitos (1999)
- Frida (2002)
- Casa de los Babys (2003)
- Morirse está en hebreo (My Mexican Shivah) (2006)
- No eres tú, soy yo (It's Not You, It's Me) (2010)
- 200 años de mexican@s en movimiento (2010)
