= Casa de los babys =

Casa de los Babys
- Theatrical release poster
- Directed by: John Sayles
- Screenplay by: John Sayles
- Produced by: Alejandro Springall; Lemore Syvan
- Starring: Marcia Gay Harden; Maggie Gyllenhaal; Daryl Hannah; Susan Lynch; Mary Steenburgen; Lili Taylor
- Cinematography: Mauricio Rubinstein
- Edited by: John Sayles
- Music by: Mason Daring
- Production companies: IFC Films; Springall Pictures
- Distributed by: IFC Films
- Release dates: September 5, 2003 (Venice Film Festival); September 19, 2003 (United States)
- Running time: 95 minutes
- Countries: Mexico; United States
- Languages: English; Spanish
- Budget: $800,000
- Box office: $475,940

Casa de los Babys ("House of the Babies") is a 2003 drama film written, directed, and edited by filmmaker John Sayles. It features an ensemble cast, including Marcia Gay Harden, Maggie Gyllenhaal and Daryl Hannah.

== Plot ==
The film tells the story of six white American women impatiently waiting out their lengthy residency requirements in an unnamed South American country before taking custody of their adoptive babies.

== Cast ==
- Marcia Gay Harden as Nan, a bullying know-it-all who tries to get her lawyer to put her at the top of the baby list by way of bribery.
- Maggie Gyllenhaal as Jennifer, a well-to-do partner of a conservative husband who has decreed that his adoptive son will carry on his name.
- Daryl Hannah as Skipper, a Colorado girl who is an exercise fanatic and a masseuse. She has lost three babies due to birth defects.
- Susan Lynch as Eileen, a tender-hearted Irish American who dreams out loud about spending an enchanted snow day with her daughter in Boston.
- Mary Steenburgen as Gayle, a recovering alcoholic and born again Christian.
- Lili Taylor as Leslie, a single New Yorker who works in publishing, speaks fluent Spanish, and rebuffs a teenage beach boy.
- Rita Moreno as Señora Muñoz.
- Martha Higareda as Celia.
- Vanessa Martinez as Asunción.

== Reception ==
=== Box-office and distribution ===
The film was first presented at the Venice Film Festival on September 5, 2003.

The film was screened at various film festivals, including the Toronto International Film Festival, Canada; the Istanbul FilmOctober Film Week, Turkey; and others.

It opened in both New York City and Los Angeles on September 19, 2003. The first-week gross was $36,456 across nine screens, and total receipts for its run reached $475,940. At its widest release, the film was shown in 71 theaters and remained in circulation for 10 weeks.

=== Critical response ===
On the review aggregator website Rotten Tomatoes, 58% of 106 critics' reviews are positive. The website's consensus reads: "Well-acted and thought provoking, if not completely satisfying." Metacritic, which uses a weighted average, assigned the film a score of 55 out of 100, based on 32 critics, indicating "mixed or average" reviews.

Critic Stephen Holden, writing for The New York Times, liked the film message and wrote, "Casa de los Babys, adheres to the same essayistic format as many of its forerunners...Despite its emotionally loaded theme, the film is a scrupulously suds-free examination of motherhood as it is viewed in first- and third-world countries. The closest it gets to misty-eyed is in its panoramic shots of wide-eyed Latino infants who will soon be transported from a nation mired in poverty to a land of plenty ... the movie's even-handed portrayal of two cultures uneasily transacting the most personal business resonates with truth."

Critic Roger Ebert lauded the film and wrote, "Sayles handles this material with gentle delicacy, as if aware that the issues are too fraught to be approached with simple messages. He shows both sides; the maid Asuncion gave up her baby and now imagines her happy life in El Norte, but we feel how much she misses her. The squeegee kids on the corner have been abandoned by their parents and might happily go home with one of these wealthy American women. Sayles approaches the story like a documentarian, showing us the women, listening to their stories, and inviting us to share their hopes and fears while speculating about their motives. There are no clear answers—just the experiences of waiting for a few weeks in the Casa de los Babys.

Critics Frederic and Mary Ann Brussat also liked the film's message and wrote, "The overall tone of Casa de los Babys promotes the spiritual practice of openness, which is the ability to see clearly, without preference or prejudice, and with empathy. Sayles continues his special mission of exploring the nuances that go into the creation of cross-cultural tensions and misunderstandings."
