= Juego de héroes =

2016 Mexican film

Juego de Héroes
- Directed by: Pedro Álvarez Tostado and Camilo Abadia
- Produced by: Juan Manuel Robles and Pedro Cedillo
- Starring: Sebastián Zurita; Omar Ayala; Cristina Rodlo; Yadira Pascault Orozco; Rafael Simón; Cronos Filmes
- Distributed by: 20th Century Fox
- Release date: August 26, 2016
- Country: Mexico
- Language: Spanish
- Budget: $2.5 million

Juego de Héroes (in English, Heroes Game) is a 2016 Mexican produced by Juan Manuel Robles and Pedro Cedillo drama film directed by Pedro Álvarez Tostado. The story primarily revolves around two characters, Luis and Carlitos, who are very different but share a common obsession, soccer. As fate would have it, these great friends take different life paths. Luis (played by Sebastián Zurita) becomes a soccer superstar for the C.F. Pachuca team, but after a serious injury during the International Club Tournament, he is unable to return to the field indefinitely. On the other hand, Carlitos, the son of a single mother who by the hands of fate joins the same orphanage where she grew up develops his gift for healing. After 10 years, these great friends meet again at a crucial moment, their lives changed forever.

== Cast ==
- Sebastián Zurita as Luis
- Francisco Villalvazo as Carlitos
- Omar Ayala as El Diablo
- Cristina Rodlo as Maro
- Yadira Pascault Orozco as Graciela
- Rafael Simón as The Trainer
