= Peter Reardon =

American music producer (born 1970)

- Born: July 24, 1970 (age 55); Houston, Texas, U.S.
- Occupations: Manufacturer of professional audio equipment for the recording industry, Gnostic priest

Peter Reardon (born July 24, 1970) is an American recording artist, music producer and professional audio equipment manufacturer. Peter grew up in Houston, Texas, where he was heavily involved in the "punk" rock scene of the 1980s. Peter began his own musical career in the middle of the decade as the singer for the little-known band Blind Ignorants, where he first explored song writing and developed his own stage presence. Peter was hired by the infamous Rap-a-Lot records and was an engineer and\or mixer on several Geto Boys records as well as a number of solo projects for individual band members. For his efforts at Rap-A-Lot, he earned his first gold record from the RIAA. Peter continued to work with Rap-A-Lot through the early 1990s until leaving for Los Angeles to pursue other recording opportunities.

The 1990s saw Reardon producing and engineering for a large variety of bands in the U.S. and Mexico. Peter was for a time president of Waxploitation records. During the 1990s, he created several of his own pieces of recording equipment. This eventually led him to found Shadow Hills Industries around the year 2000. Subsequently, he moved the company and himself back to Texas settling in the Austin area.

On October 13, 2011, Reardon made a little seen appearance outside industry conferences when he was interviewed on Pensado's Place. In the interview Peter discusses his past work, his philosophy on creating equipment and music production. Peter also discusses his affinity for secrets and how he has the ability to allow the company that sells his equipment to deal with customers allowing him to use the company website to do something other than sell product. Dave Pensado goes on to say that Shadow Hills equipment has become an industry standard.

Artists worked with: The Odd Squad, The Terrorists, Geto Boys, Scarface, Ganksta N-I-P, Too Much Trouble, Big Mello, Joyfinger, Coolio, Westside Connection, J'Son, Off Da Hook, Strictly Ballroom, Clawfinger, Zurdok, Chris Vrenna, Teargas & Plateglass, Ben Vaughn, Son of a Gun, Gwendolyn, Tweaker,
