= Chetes =

Mexican musician (born 1979)

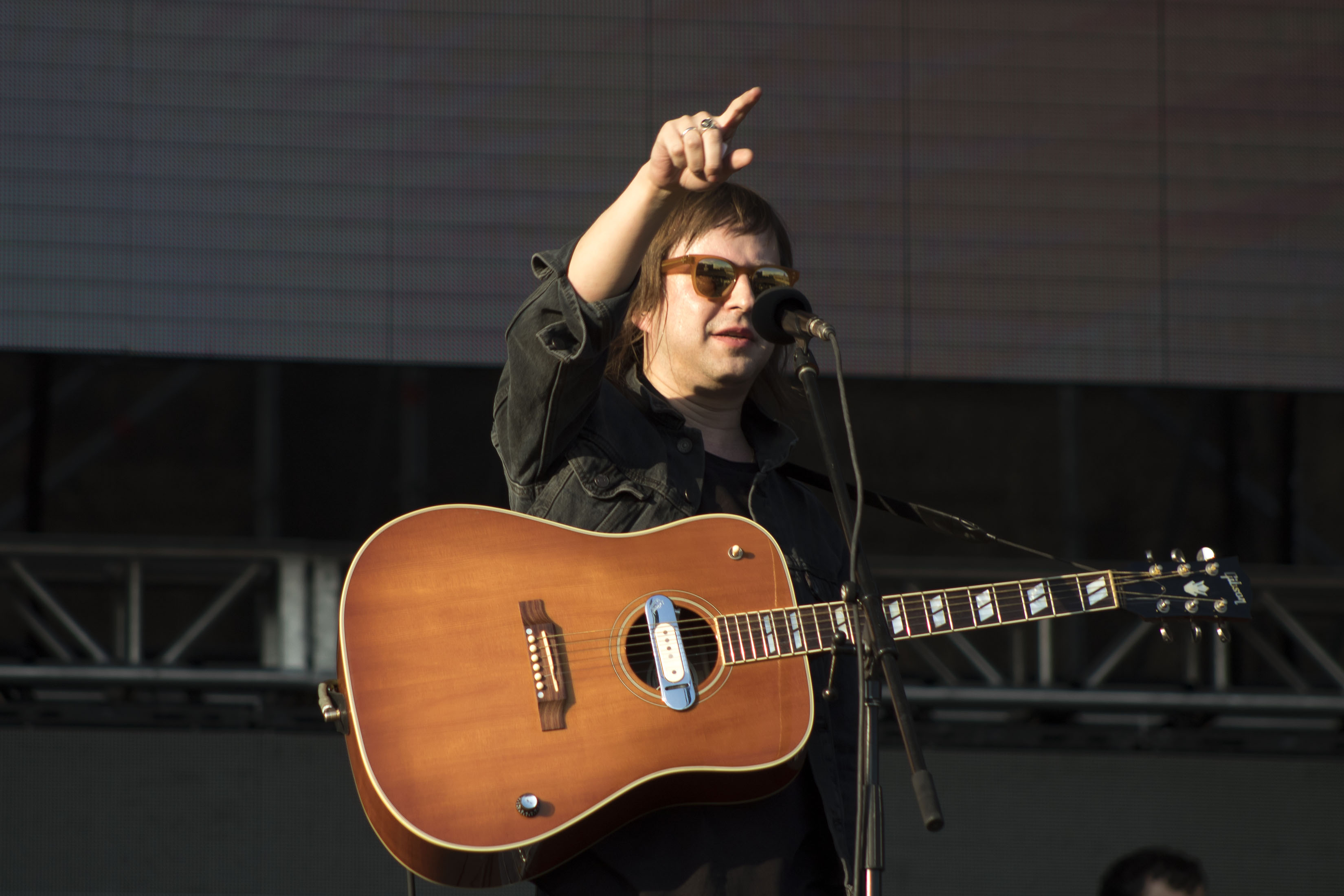
- Chetes performing in 2017

Background information
- Born: Luis Gerardo Garza Cisneros; 19 September 1979 (age 46); Monterrey, Mexico
- Genres: Alternative rock; pop rock
- Occupations: Musician; singer-songwriter
- Instruments: Vocals; guitar; piano; bass
- Years active: 1993–present
- Label: EMI
- Formerly of: Zurdok; Vaquero
- Website: chetes.com.mx

Luis Gerardo Garza Cisneros (Spanish: [lwis xeˈɾaɾðo ˈɣaɾsa sisˈneɾos]; (Note: In isolation, Garza is pronounced [ˈgaɾsa].) born 19 September 1979), better known by his stage name Chetes (Spanish: [ˈtʃetes]), is a Mexican rock musician, known as the frontman of the Avanzada Regia rock bands Zurdok and Vaquero as well as for his solo work.

== Biography ==
Chetes was born and raised in Monterrey, Mexico. He joined the fledgling rock band Zurdok in 1993 and went on to record three albums with them. The group broke up in 2002, and in 2005, Chetes, along with former Zurdok bandmate Maurizio Terracina, created the band Vaquero, together with Rodrigo Guardiola. They released a self-titled album the same year.

In 2005, Chetes recorded a cover of Miguel Bosé's song "Si Tú No Vuelves" with the Spanish duo Amaral, which was released on their 2005 album, Pájaros en la cabeza. A year later, he issued his debut solo record, Blanco Fácil. This was followed by Efecto Dominó in 2008 and Hipnosis in 2010. Chetes has also composed soundtracks for the films El Comediante (2022) and Sobriedad me estás matando (2026).

== Discography ==
=== with Zurdok ===
- Antena (1997)
- Hombre Sintetizador (1999)
- Maquillaje (2001)

=== with Vaquero ===
- Vaquero (2005)

=== Solo ===
Studio albums

- Blanco Fácil (2006)
- Efecto Dominó (2008)
- Hipnosis (2010)
- Stereotipos (2016)
- Odisea Magnetica (2019)
- Polvo de Estrellas with Calexico (2024)

EPs

- Plug and Play (Acústica) (EP, 2007)
- Cardio Sapien (EP, 2012)

Live albums

- Chetes 20 Live (2018)
- En vivo (2026)

Compilations

- Lo Mejor (2012)

Soundtracks

- El Comediante (2022)
- Sobriedad me estás matando (2026)
