= No eres tú, soy yo =

- Theatrical release poster
- Directed by: Alejandro Springall
- Written by: Alejandro Springall
- Story by: Juan Taratuto
- Produced by: Matthias Ehrenberg; Paula Jaramillo
- Starring: Eugenio Derbez; Alejandra Barros; Martina García; Juan Ríos; Alberto Estrella
- Cinematography: Celiana Cárdenas
- Edited by: Jorge García
- Music by: Christian Basso
- Distributed by: Warner Bros. Pictures
- Release date: August 27, 2010
- Country: Mexico
- Language: Spanish

No eres tú, soy yo (English: It's not you, it's me) is a 2010 Mexican romantic comedy directed by Alejandro Springall starring Eugenio Derbez, Alejandra Barros and Martina García and based on the Argentine film No sos vos, soy yo (2004), written by Juan Taratuto. It was produced by Matthias Ehrenberg and filmed in Mexico City.

The script was written by Luis Dawn and shows the experiences of Javier Herrera, an unlucky cardiovascular surgeon who, after being left by his wife María, must fight the problems of his love life upon not being able easily to forget his former mate. In the end, he meets Julia, an unmarried mother who works in a pet shop, with whom he falls in love and who helps him to bear his separation. No eres tú, soy yo was released 27 August 2010 in Mexico.

== Synopsis ==
Javier Herrera (Eugenio Derbez) is a cardiovascular surgeon whose world comes crashing down shortly after his wedding when his wife, María (Alejandra Barros) tells him that she loves someone else. He must start over completely, with no money and no job, and a totally empty apartment. He tries esoteric therapies and even adopts a dog to attract women, but to no avail: Javier only remembers his ex- wife. Enter Julia (Martina García), a free-spirited young woman willing to be his friend unconditionally, if only Javier could forget Maria.

== Cast ==
- Eugenio Derbez as Javier Herrera

In an interview with Cinemanía magazine, Derbez commented on the character: "He's complicated ... he has this feminine side that often we do not see in men: one enamored with his wife, whose world ends when she leaves him; it is to teach the women that the men cry, too, that we can die of love and of a broken heart." Unlike Derbez' previous projects, this one did not involve him in any technical aspect of the film.

- Alejandra Barros as María
- Martina García as Julia

About their participation in the film, García remarked: "Alexander is an passionate, indulging director, very clear in what he asks of you. It has been precious to work with him. He has seemed to me a truly exception human being and director."

- Mauritius Herrera as Ramiro
- Gina Morett as Georgina
- Aaron Hernán as Horacio
- Blancha Sanchez as Estela
- Juan Ríos Cantú as Martín
- Héctor Grouse as Edmundo the Psychiatrist.
- Mónica Dionne as Dra. Veronica Villar
- Vanessa Mateo as Lola
- Alberto Estrella as Dr. Carlos
- Sharon Zundel as Laura
- Ricardo Kleinbaum as Veterinarian
- Shaula Vega as Gaby.
- Mariana Gajá as Amandita.
- Yadira Pascault Orozco as Dog Owner.

== Production ==
=== Filming ===
The shooting of No eres tú, soy yo lasted a total of eight weeks, from 11 April to 23 June 2009, during which time there was a production delay due to the H1N1 pandemic that spread through Mexico that year, even though no one in the cast or crew became ill.

The main filming sites were the Inner Circuit, some zones in Pedregal de San Ángel (Jardines del Pedregal) and the Colonia del Valle and Colonia Narvarte neighborhoods in Mexico City.

== Promotion, opening and earnings ==
The first promotional poster debuted 12 May 2010, showing the film's title over a red, torn background and the lone phrase, "Coming Soon" on its lower border. A little over one month later, on 15 June, the final poster was launched, with images of Derbez and Barros. The film premiered 17 August 2010 in the complex Cinemark Reforma 222 theatre in the Federal District, and went on to open the Sixth Annual Monterrey International Film Festival on 20 August, being exhibited also in the Second Annual Chihuahua International Film Festival one day later. Days later, 27 August 2010, was released commercially in more than 300 cinemas nationwide.

In its first three days of exhibition, No eres tú, soy yo collected a total of 18.4 million MXN, making it the fourth-highest-earning romantic comedy in Mexico, with 377,000 viewers altogether, behind only Enchanted (2007; 30.3 million MXN), What Happens in Vegas (2008; 21.4 million MXN) and The Proposal (2009; 18.7 million MXN). In addition, it is Derbez' highest-earning debut, surpassing La Misma Luna (2007), and also becoming Mexico's sixth-highest in opening-weekend earnings, behind Otra película de huevos y un pollo (2009), El crimen del Padre Amaro (2002), Una película de huevos (2006), Rudo y Cursi (2008) y High School Musical: El Desafío (2008). Due to the success of the opening, it was announced that the film would be released in September in at least 20 additional cities across the country. Exactly a month after its opening in cinemas, the film collected more than 100 million MXN, according to a report published by the National Chamber of the Cinematographic and Videogram Industry (CANACINE). Due to this last development, No eres tú, soy yo became the ninth highest-grossing film in the history of Mexican cinema, exceeding in gains the productions Arráncame la vida (2008; 97 million MXN) and Amores perros (2000). In fact, the film is considered the most-seen film in Mexico during September 2010, the month in which the Bicentennial of the Independence of Mexico was celebrated. According to Derbez: "I foresaw that it would be a good film, but you never can foresee this success because the cinema is very complicated. I am very thankful to the people, who have taken two films past the 100 million mark [referring to La misma luna], and in the top ten, has me fascinated, I can't believe it."
