= My Mexican Shivah =

- Directed by: Alejandro Springall
- Written by: Jorge Goldenberg; Alejandro Springall
- Starring: Raquel Pankowsky; David Ostrosky; Sergio Kleiner
- Distributed by: Emerging Pictures
- Release date: 2007
- Running time: 98 minutes
- Countries: Mexico; United States
- Languages: Hebrew; Spanish; Yiddish

My Mexican Shivah is a 2007 Mexican-American comedy film directed by Alejandro Springall and starring Raquel Pankowsky, David Ostrosky and Sergio Kleiner.

== Cast ==
- Raquel Pankowsky
- David Ostrosky
- Sharon Zundel
- Emilio Savinni
- Sergio Kleiner

== Reception ==
The film has a 43% rating on Rotten Tomatoes. Eric Henderson of Slant Magazine awarded the film two stars out of four.
