= Gilberto Gless =

Gilberto Gless (born September 6, 1963) is a Mexican impersonator, comedian, singer, composer and actor known for his many characters, among them the impersonation of Vicente Fernandez and Luis Miguel. He has been called "el imitador de América" (America's impersonator).

== Biography ==
Gilberto Gless was born in Parral, Chihuahua on September 6, 1963. He is many times known for portraying a variety of artists from various backgrounds such as Shakira, Marco Antonio Solís, Julio Iglesias, Roberto Carlos, Dyango, José Luis Rodriguez "El Puma", among others. Since his beginnings in the year 2000 he has been critically lauded for his style and comic delivery, being considered among the best of the genre.

He hasn't been free from scrutiny however. As an example, in 2016 he was almost barred from impersonating Juan Gabriel by Gabriel's family. He also performed a rap version impersonating Vicente Fernandez, which Fernandez later declared he didn't like.

He has been known to be proud of his origins and has consistently stated that he loves his homeland and wishes to become more recognized as part of the people in the industry that are more positive.
