= John Sayles =

American film director, screenwriter and novelist (born 1950)

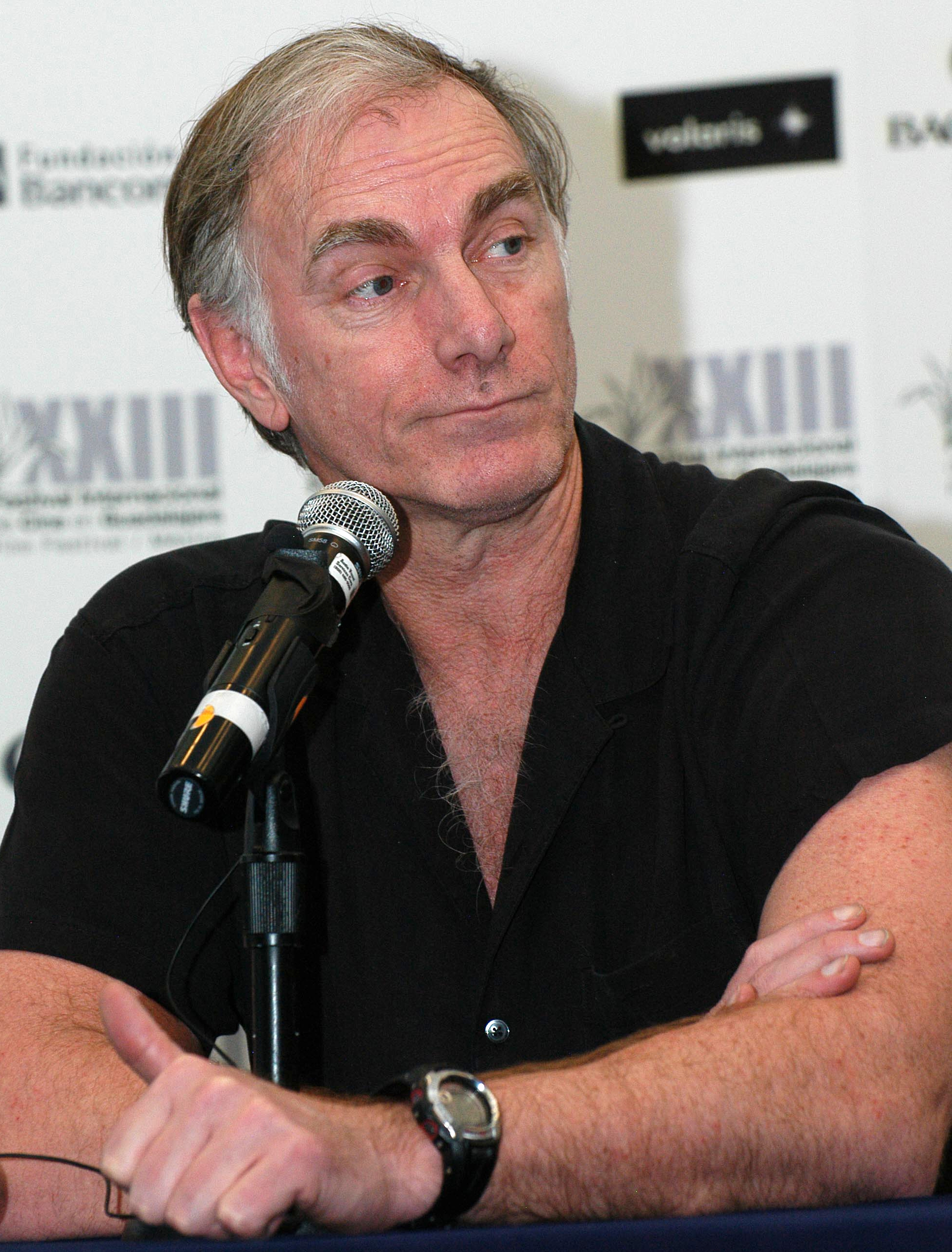
- Sayles at the 2008 Guadalajara International Film Festival in Guadalajara, Mexico
- Born: John Thomas Sayles; September 28, 1950 (age 76); Schenectady, New York, U.S.
- Education: Williams College
- Occupations: Director; screenwriter; editor; actor; novelist
- Years active: 1971–present

John Thomas Sayles (born September 28, 1950) is an American independent film director, screenwriter, editor, actor, and novelist. He is known for writing and directing the films The Brother from Another Planet (1984), Matewan (1987), Eight Men Out (1988), Passion Fish (1992), The Secret of Roan Inish (1994), Lone Star (1996), Men with Guns (1997), Sunshine State (2002), and Silver City (2004).

For Eight Men Out, Sayles was nominated for the USC Scripter Award. He has twice been nominated for the Academy Award for Best Original Screenplay, for Passion Fish and Lone Star. At the 56th Golden Globe Awards, Men with Guns was nominated for Best Foreign Language Film. His directorial debut Return of the Secaucus 7 (1980) and Matewan, were added to the United States National Film Registry by the Library of Congress in 1997 and 2023, respectively.

== Early life ==
Sayles was born on September 28, 1950, in Schenectady, New York, the son of Mary (née Rausch), a teacher, and Donald John Sayles, a school administrator. Both of his parents were Catholic and of half-Irish descent. John Sayles has referred to himself as a "Catholic atheist". He attended Williams College in Williamstown, Massachusetts, with frequent collaborators Gordon Clapp and David Strathairn, as well as his longtime partner, Maggie Renzi. Sayles earned a B.A. in psychology in 1972.

== Career ==
After college, Sayles moved to Boston where he held a series of blue-collar jobs. In the summer of 1974 he acted and directed at the Eastern Slope Playhouse in North Conway, New Hampshire. In 1975 he worked with The Atlantic Monthly on expanding a 50-page story he had submitted. The effort culminated in his first novel, The Pride of the Bimbos, published in 1975.

Like Martin Scorsese, Francis Ford Coppola, Ron Howard, James Cameron and Jonathan Demme, Sayles began his film career working for independent, low-budget producer Roger Corman. Sayles was discovered by Frances Doel, the script supervisor for Corman's New World Pictures. She hired Sayles to rewrite a Jaws knockoff which was in development; it became the film Piranha (1978). He soon demonstrated an ability to rapidly create scripts which met Corman's standards. Sayles has been called "the greatest screenwriter to ever work at New World."

=== Directorial debut ===
In 1979, Sayles used $30,000 he earned writing scripts for Corman to fund his first film, Return of the Secaucus 7. Making the film on a limited budget, he shot it in 16 mm; he set the story over a three-day weekend to limit costume changes, and wrote about people his age so that he could cast his actor friends from the Eastern Slope Playhouse. He chose as the primary setting a large nearby house to avoid travel expenses or the need for permits for different locations. The film received near-unanimous critical acclaim at the time and has maintained that reputation. In 1997, the National Film Preservation Board announced that Return of the Secaucus 7 was one of 25 films selected that year for preservation in the National Film Registry at the Library of Congress.

=== Filmmaker and screenwriter ===
In 1983, after making the films Baby It's You (starring Rosanna Arquette) and Lianna (a story in which a woman grows discontented with her marriage and falls in love with another woman), Sayles received a MacArthur Fellowship. He put the money into the science fiction feature The Brother from Another Planet, a film about a three-toed humanoid who escapes bondage on another world and crash-lands in New York harbor; because he is Africanoid in appearance, he finds himself at home among the people of Harlem, being pursued by European-looking alien enslaver men in black. In the 1980s, Sayles directed the music videos for three songs from Bruce Springsteen's Born in the USA album. In 1989, Sayles created and wrote the pilot episode for the television show Shannon's Deal about a down-and-out Philadelphia lawyer played by Jamey Sheridan. Sayles received a 1990 Edgar Award for his teleplay for the pilot. The show ran for 16 episodes before being canceled in 1991.

He has funded most of his films by writing genre scripts, such as Piranha, Alligator, The Howling, and The Challenge. He has also earned money by working as a script doctor, for example, he did rewrites for Apollo 13 and Mimic. Sayles's genre script Night Skies inspired what would eventually become the film E.T. the Extra-Terrestrial. The film's director, Steven Spielberg, later commissioned Sayles to write a script (unused) for the fourth Jurassic Park film.

The list of films directed by Sayles includes Lone Star, Passion Fish, Eight Men Out, The Secret of Roan Inish, Matewan, and Sunshine State. He works with a regular repertory of actors, most notably Chris Cooper, David Strathairn, and Gordon Clapp, each of whom appeared in at least four of his films. Sayles often acts in small roles in films he directs, and he has occasionally been employed as a supporting actor in other people's films and TV programs, for instance, after collaborating with Joe Dante on Piranha and The Howling, Sayles acted in Dante's movie, Matinee.

Sayles serves on the advisory board for the Austin Film Society. Maggie Renzi has been Sayles's long-time companion (and collaborator), but they have not married. She has produced most of his films since Lianna. In early 2003, Sayles signed the Not In Our Name "Statement of Conscience" (along with Noam Chomsky, Steve Earle, Brian Eno, Jesse Jackson, Viggo Mortensen, Bonnie Raitt, Oliver Stone, Marisa Tomei, Susan Sarandon, and others) which opposed the invasion of Iraq. In 2009, Sayles was hired to write a proposed HBO series based on the early life of Anthony Kiedis of the Red Hot Chili Peppers. In May 2010, Sayles submitted a pilot episode, but the following year it was announced that HBO was no longer interested in the series and that FX picked up the rights. By that point, Sayles had dropped out of the project.

In February 2010, he began shooting his 17th feature film, the historical war drama Amigo, in the Philippines. The film is a fictional account of events during the Philippine–American War, with a cast that includes Joel Torre, Chris Cooper, and Garret Dillahunt. Sayles's last directorial effort was Go for Sisters (2013). In subsequent years, he struggled to raise enough money to make a film with professional actors and crew. As of late 2026, he was reportedly planning to direct his next film, a Western titled I Passed This Way.

=== Novelist ===
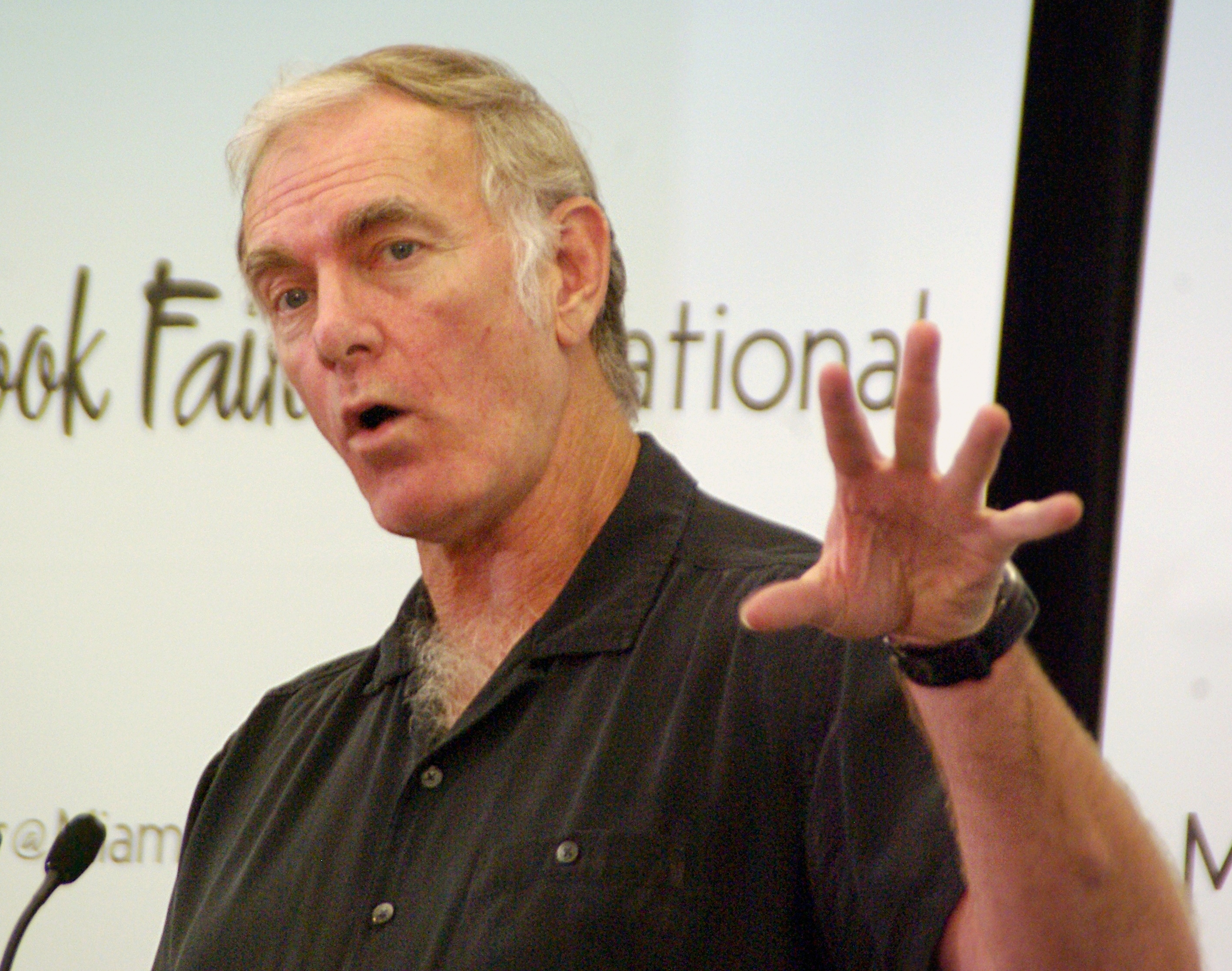
Sayles at the 2011 Miami Book Fair International in Miami

Parallel with his film career, Sayles has produced a steady stream of novels. He enjoyed early success with Union Dues (1977), which was a finalist for the National Book Award for Fiction. With the publication of Los Gusanos (1991)—a sprawling tale of Miami's Cuban exile community and 50 years of Cuban–American relations—Sayles began writing novels on a broad canvas with a penchant for lengthy works of historical fiction. He once called Gravity's Rainbow by Thomas Pynchon "the best 'big' book I know", and as Tom LeClair said of Sayles's 1,000-page A Moment in the Sun (2011), "In its scale, multiple plots, rigorous attention to setting and technology, colloquial exactitude, race consciousness and suspicion of political power, A Moment in the Sun is admirably Pynchonian." Another reviewer noted that for a budget-constrained independent filmmaker like Sayles, it "must have seemed a luxury to expand the story far beyond what would fit in 90 minutes, and to include places from the past that would be prohibitive to reproduce".

In a review of the 700-page Jamie MacGillivray (2022), Alex Preston wrote: "As with his previous books Yellow Earth (2020) and A Moment in the Sun (2011), this is a vast, epic and multidimensional tale, a larger and more various narrative than any film could hope to contain." Critics praised Sayles for skillfully managing the demands of the lengthy novel form, with "his rare ability to inhabit the intersecting perspectives, motivations, and desires of a diverse dramatis personae", and for being able "to balance his cinematic crowds with novelistic inwardness".

In interviews, Sayles has spoken about the process in which his story ideas and historical research are sometimes turned into fiction, and sometimes into film: "Both Jamie MacGillivray and To Save the Man started as screenplays we couldn't raise the money to make. Casa de los Babys was a movie I made based on a short story I'd written." The Honeydripper screenplay originated with his short story "Keeping Time", published in the Dillinger in Hollywood (2004) collection. His film Amigo grew out of the research he did for A Moment in the Sun, both works taking place at the turn of the 20th century in the U.S., Cuba, and the Philippines. Late in his career, when Sayles was unable to raise funds for new films, he continued to publish new fiction.

== Filmography ==
=== Film ===
| Year | Title | Director | Writer | Editor |
|---|---|---|---|---|
| 1980 | Return of the Secaucus 7 | Yes | Yes | Yes |
| 1983 | Lianna | Yes | Yes | Yes |
| 1983 | Baby It's You | Yes | Yes | No |
| 1984 | The Brother from Another Planet | Yes | Yes | Yes |
| 1987 | Matewan | Yes | Yes | No |
| 1988 | Eight Men Out | Yes | Yes | No |
| 1991 | City of Hope | Yes | Yes | Yes |
| 1992 | Passion Fish | Yes | Yes | Yes |
| 1994 | The Secret of Roan Inish | Yes | Yes | Yes |
| 1996 | Lone Star | Yes | Yes | Yes |
| 1997 | Men with Guns | Yes | Yes | Yes |
| 1999 | Limbo | Yes | Yes | Yes |
| 2002 | Sunshine State | Yes | Yes | Yes |
| 2003 | Casa de los babys | Yes | Yes | Yes |
| 2004 | Silver City | Yes | Yes | Yes |
| 2007 | Honeydripper | Yes | Yes | Yes |
| 2010 | Amigo | Yes | Yes | Yes |
| 2013 | Go for Sisters | Yes | Yes | Yes |

==== Writer ====
- Piranha (1978)
- The Lady in Red (1979)
- Battle Beyond the Stars (1980)
- Alligator (1980)
- The Howling (1981)
- The Challenge (1982)
- Enormous Changes at the Last Minute (1983)
- The Clan of the Cave Bear (1986)
- Breaking In (1989)
- Shakma (1990)
- Men of War (1994)
- The Spiderwick Chronicles (2008)
- The Devil's Highway (2018)

==== Executive producer ====
- Little Saints (1999)
- Girlfight (2000)
- My Mexican Shivah (2007)
- Talents (2015)
- The Man Who Killed Hitler and Then the Bigfoot (2018)

=== Television ===
| Year | Title | Notes |
|---|---|---|
| 1980 | A Perfect Match | Television film; writer |
| 1986 | Unnatural Causes | Television film; writer |
| 1989–1991 | Shannon's Deal | Television series; creator, writer, and producer |
| 2018 | The Alienist | Television series; writer and consulting producer |
| 2026 | The Gray House | Television series; writer |

=== Acting roles ===
| Year | Title | Role | Notes |
|---|---|---|---|
| 1978 | Piranha | Soldier | Uncredited |
| 1980 | Return of the Secaucus 7 | Howie | |
| 1981 | The Howling | Morgue Attendant | Uncredited |
| 1983 | Lianna | Jerry | |
| 1984 | The Brother from Another Planet | Man in Black #2 | |
| 1984 | Hard Choices | Don | |
| 1986 | Something Wild | Motorcycle Cop | |
| 1986 | Unnatural Causes | Lloyd | Television film |
| 1987 | Matewan | Hardshell Preacher | |
| 1988 | Eight Men Out | Ring Lardner | |
| 1989 | Untamagiru | US High Commissioner | |
| 1989 | The End of the Night | Wayne | |
| 1990 | Shannon's Deal | Ronny Nash | 2 episodes |
| 1990 | Little Vegas | Mike | |
| 1990 | Shakma | Cop | |
| 1991 | City of Hope | Carl | |
| 1991 | Square One Television | Roy "Lefty" Combs | 4 episodes |
| 1992 | Straight Talk | Guy Girardi | |
| 1992 | Passion Fish | Soap Doctor | Uncredited |
| 1992 | Malcolm X | FBI Agent | |
| 1993 | Matinee | Bob | |
| 1997 | Gridlock'd | Cop | |
| 2000 | Girlfight | Science Teacher | |
| 2002 | Sunshine State | Man who almost got hit by a golf ball | Uncredited |
| 2007 | Honeydripper | Zeke | |
| 2009 | In the Electric Mist | Michael Goldman | |
| 2012 | The Normals | Dr. Marx | |
| 2025 | Poker Face | Chief Hal | Episode: "The Taste of Human Blood" |

== Bibliography ==
=== Novels ===
- Pride of the Bimbos (1975). Little, Brown. ISBN 978-0316772303
- Union Dues (1977). Little, Brown. ISBN 978-0316772310
- Los Gusanos (1991). HarperCollins Publishers. ISBN 978-0060166533
- A Moment in the Sun (2011). McSweeney's Books. ISBN 978-1936365180
- Yellow Earth (2022). Haymarket Books. ISBN 978-1642597073
- Jamie MacGillivray: The Renegade's Journey (2022). Melville House. ISBN 978-1612199887
- To Save the Man (2025). Melville House. ISBN 978-1685891411
- Crucible (2026). Melville House. ISBN 978-1685892272

=== Short story collections ===
- The Anarchists' Convention (1979). Little, Brown. ISBN 978-0316772327
- Dillinger in Hollywood (2004). Nation Books. ISBN 978-1560256328

=== Screenplays ===
- Piranha (1978). New English Library. ISBN 978-0450042799
- Night Skies (1996). Sydney: The Cinestore. OCLC 222720465
- Men with Guns & Lone Star (1998). Faber & Faber. ISBN 978-0571195275
- Silver City and Other Screenplays (2004). Nation Books. ISBN 978-1560256311

=== Non-fiction ===
- Thinking in Pictures: The Making of the Movie "Matewan" (1987). Houghton Mifflin. ISBN 978-0395453889
- Sayles on Sayles (1998). Faber & Faber. Edited by Gavin Smith. ISBN 978-0571192809
- John Sayles: Interviews (1999). University Press of Mississippi. Edited by Diane Carson. ISBN 978-1578061389
- Sayles Talk: New Perspectives on Independent Filmmaker John Sayles (2006). Wayne State University Press. Edited by Diane Carson and Heidi Kenaga. ISBN 978-0814331552
- Backstory 5: Interviews with Screenwriters of the 1990s (2010). University of California Press. Edited by Patrick McGilligan. ISBN 978-0520251052

== Music videos ==
- Bruce Springsteen – "Born in the U.S.A."
- Bruce Springsteen – "I'm on Fire"
- Bruce Springsteen – "Glory Days"

== Awards/nominations ==
=== Films ===
Awards for Return of the Secaucus 7:

- Best Independent Film (Win) – 1981 Boston Society of Film Critics Awards
- Best Screenplay (Win) – John Sayles – 1980 Los Angeles Film Critics Association Awards
- National Film Registry – 1997 Library of Congress, National Film Preservation Board
- Best Comedy Written Directly for the Screen (Nominated) – John Sayles – 1981 Writers Guild of America Award
- Best Screenplay (Nominated) – John Sayles – 1980 New York Film Critics Circle
- Second Place – 1981 US Film Festival (later became the Sundance Film Festival)

Awards for Matewan:

- Critics Award (Nominated) – John Sayles – 1987 Deauville American Film Festival
- Best Director (Nominated) – John Sayles – 1988 Independent Spirit Awards
- Best Screenplay (Nominated) – John Sayles – 1988 Independent Spirit Awards
- Human Rights Award (Win) – 1988 Political Film Society

Awards for Shannon's Deal:

- Best Television Feature or Miniseries (Win) – 1990 Edgar Award

Awards for City of Hope:

- Critics Award (Nominated) – John Sayles – 1991 Deauville American Film Festival
- Special Award, Democracy Award (Win) – 1992 Political Film Society
- Tokyo Grand Prix Award (Win) – John Sayles – 1991 Tokyo International Film Festival

Awards for Passion Fish:

- Best Original Screenplay (Nominated) – John Sayles – 1993 Academy Awards
- Golden Spur Award (Win) – John Sayles – 1993 Flanders International Film Festival
- Best Screenplay Written Directly for the Screen (Nominated) – John Sayles – 1993 Writers Guild of America Award

Awards for The Secret of Roan Inish:

- Best Genre Video Release (Nominated) – 1996 Academy of Science Fiction, Fantasy & Horror Films
- International Critics Award (Win) – John Sayles – 1996 Gérardmer Film Festival
- Best Director (Nominated) – John Sayles – 1996 Independent Spirit Awards
- Best Screenplay (Nominated) – John Sayles – 1996 Independent Spirit Awards

Awards for Lone Star:

- Best Original Screenplay (Nominated) – John Sayles – 1997 Academy Awards
- Best Original Screenplay (Nominated) – John Sayles – 1997 BAFTA Awards
- Best Screenplay, Motion Picture (Nominated) – John Sayles – 1997 Golden Globes
- Best Screenplay Written Directly for the Screen (Nominated) – John Sayles – 1997 Writers Guild of America Award
- Best Picture (Nominated) – 1997 Broadcast Film Critics Association Awards
- Best Motion Picture Original Screenplay (Win) – John Sayles – 1997 Golden Satellite Awards
- Best Motion Picture – Drama (Nominated) – Maggie Renzi & R. Paul Miller – 1997 Golden Satellite Awards
- Best Screenplay (Nominated) – John Sayles – 1997 Independent Spirit Awards
- Best Film (Win) – Lone Star – 1996 Lone Star Film & Television Awards
- Best Director (Win) – John Sayles – 1996 Lone Star Film & Television Awards
- Best Screenplay (Win) – John Sayles – 1996 Lone Star Film & Television Awards
- Special Achievement Award for Outstanding Feature Film (Win) – 1996 NCLR Bravo Awards
- Best Director (Win) – John Sayles – 1997 Southeastern Film Critics Association Awards

Awards for Men with Guns/Hombres armados:

- Best Foreign Independent Film (Nominated) – 1998 British Independent Film Awards
- Best Foreign Film (Nominated) – 1999 Golden Globes
- Peace Award (Nominated) – 1998 Political Film Society
- FIPRESCI Prize (Win) – John Sayles – 1997 San Sebastián International Film Festival
- OCIC Award (Win) – John Sayles – 1997 San Sebastián International Film Festival
- Solidarity Award (Win) – John Sayles – 1997 San Sebastián International Film Festival
- Golden Seashell Award for Best Film (Nominated) – John Sayles – 1997 San Sebastián International Film Festival

Awards for Limbo:

- Best Director Golden Space Needle Award (Win) – John Sayles − 1999 Seattle International Film Festival
- Outstanding Indies (Win) – 1999 National Board of Review

Awards for Sunshine State:

- Golden Orange Award (Win) – John Sayles – 2002 Florida Film Critics Circle Awards
- Special Mention For Excellence In Filmmaking (Win) – 2002 National Board of Review

Award for Silver City:

- Golden Seashell Award for Best Film (Nominated) – John Sayles – 2004 San Sebastián International Film Festival

Awards for Honeydripper:

- Outstanding Independent or Foreign Film (Win) – 2008 NAACP Image Award
- Outstanding Writing in a Motion Picture (Theatrical or Television) (Nominated) – John Sayles – 2008 NAACP Image Awards
- Top 10 Independent Films of 2007 – National Board of Review of Motion Pictures
- Best Screenplay (Win) – John Sayles – 2007 San Sebastián International Film Festival (Tied with Gracia Querejeta and David Planell for Siete mesas de billar francés (2007))

=== Other recognition ===
Sayles's first published story, "I-80 Nebraska", won an O. Henry Award; his novel, Union Dues, was nominated for a National Book Award as well as the National Book Critics Circle Award.

In 1983, Sayles received the John D. MacArthur Award, given to 20 Americans in diverse fields each year for their innovative work. He has also been the recipient of the Eugene V. Debs Award, the John Steinbeck Award and the John Cassavetes Award. He was honored with the Ian McLellan Hunter Award for Lifetime Achievement by the Writers Guild of America (1999).

In 2013, Sayles and Maggie Renzi donated their non-film archive to the University of Michigan. The materials are held at the Harlan Hatcher Graduate Library. Sayles's films are housed at the UCLA Film & Television Archive.

== Recurring collaborators ==
Actors who have regularly worked with Sayles include Maggie Renzi, David Strathairn, Joe Morton, Chris Cooper, Mary McDonnell, Vincent Spano, Kevin Tighe, Josh Mostel, Tom Wright, Gordon Clapp and Angela Bassett.

| Work Actor | 1980 | 1983 | | 1984 | 1987 | 1988 | 1991 | 1992 | 1994 | 1996 | 1997 | 1999 | 2002 | 2003 | 2004 | 2007 | 2010 | 2013 |
| Work Actor | Return of the Secaucus 7 | Lianna | Baby It's You | The Brother from Another Planet | Matewan | Eight Men Out | City of Hope | Passion Fish | The Secret of Roan Inish | Lone Star | Men with Guns | Limbo | Sunshine State | Casa de los Babys | Silver City | Honeydripper | Amigo | Go for Sisters |
|---|---|---|---|---|---|---|---|---|---|---|---|---|---|---|---|---|---|---|
| Jace Alexander | | | | | X mark | X mark | X mark | | | | | | | | | | | |
| Eliot Asinof | | | | | | X mark | | | | | | | X mark | | | | | |
| Angela Bassett | | | | | | | X mark | X mark | | | | | X mark | | | | | |
| Jesse Borrego | | | | | | | | | | X mark | | | | | | | | X mark |
| Leo Burmester | | | | | | | | X mark | | X mark | | X mark | | | | | | |
| Gordon Clapp | X mark | | | | X mark | X mark | | | | | | | X mark | | | | | |
| Bill Cobbs | | | | X mark | | | | | | | | | X mark | | | | | |
| Chris Cooper | | | | | X mark | | X mark | | | X mark | | | | | X mark | | X mark | |
| Liane Alexandra Curtis | | | X mark | X mark | | | | | | | | | | | | | | |
| Vondie Curtis-Hall | | | | | | | | X mark | | | | | | | | X mark | | |
| Richard Edson | | | | | | X mark | | | | | | | X mark | | | | | |
| Miguel Ferrer | | | | | | | | | | | | | X mark | | X mark | | | |
| Kathryn Grody | | | | | | | | | | | X mark | X mark | | | | | | |
| Lisa Gay Hamilton | | | | | | | | | | | | | | | | X mark | | X mark |
| Daryl Hannah | | | | | | | | | | | | | | X mark | X mark | | | |
| Clifton James | | | | | | X mark | | | | X mark | | | X mark | | | | | |
| Kris Kristofferson | | | | | | | | | | X mark | | X mark | | | X mark | | | |
| Perry Lang | | | | | | X mark | | | | | | | X mark | | | | | |
| Susan Lynch | | | | | | | | | X mark | | | | | X mark | | | | |
| Vanessa Martinez | | | | | | | | | | X mark | | X mark | | X mark | | | | X mark |
| Mary McDonnell | | | | | X mark | | | X mark | | | | | | | | | | |
| Sam McMurray | | | X mark | | | | | | | | | | X mark | | | | | |
| Joe Morton | | | | X mark | | | X mark | | | X mark | | | | | | | | |
| Josh Mostel | | | | X mark | X mark | | X mark | | | | | | | | | | | |
| Bill Raymond | | | X mark | | | X mark | | | | | | | | | | | | |
| Maggie Renzi | X mark | X mark | | X mark | X mark | X mark | X mark | X mark | | | | | | | | | | |
| John Sayles | X mark | X mark | | X mark | X mark | X mark | X mark | X mark | | | | | | | | X mark | | |
| Vincent Spano | | | X mark | | | | X mark | | | | | | | | | | | |
| Mary Steenburgen | | | | | | | | | | | | | X mark | X mark | | X mark | | |
| Fisher Stevens | | | X mark | X mark | | | | | | | | | | | | | | |
| David Strathairn | X mark | | | X mark | X mark | X mark | X mark | X mark | | | | X mark | | | | | | |
| Kevin Tighe | | | | | X mark | X mark | X mark | | | | | | | | | | | |
| Ralph Waite | | | | | | | | | | | | | X mark | | X mark | | | |
| Tom Wright | | | | X mark | X mark | | X mark | X mark | | | | | X mark | | | X mark | | |

== See also ==
- Night Skies – for a more complete history of how a proposed sequel to Close Encounters of the Third Kind became the story basis for E.T. the Extra-Terrestrial
