= Zurdok =

Mexican rock band

- Origin: Monterrey, Nuevo León, Mexico
- Genre: Rock en español
- Years active: 1993–2003 (One-off reunions: 2006, 2014)
- Label: Universal
- Spinoffs: Vaquero
- Past members: Chetes; David Izquierdo; Maurizio Terracina; Gustavo "Cátsup" Hernández; Jorge "Fletch" Sáenz; Fernando Martz

Zurdok was a Mexican rock band from Monterrey, formed in 1993 under the name Zurdok Movimento. They recorded three studio albums that achieved success in the rock en español genre. Lead singer Fernando Martz left the band in 1999, and Chetes remained as the main vocalist. Zurdok went on hiatus in 2002 and broke up a year later. The band reunited briefly in 2006 and 2014. Zurdok appeared in the 2020 docuseries Break It All: The History of Rock in Latin America.

== Career ==
=== Early years ===
The drummer Jorge "Fletch" Sáenz and guitarist David Izquierdo, elementary school friends, formed the band Zurdok Movimento in 1993. They were joined by bassist Maurizio Terracina and later introduced to the vocalists Gerardo Garza, better known as Chetes, and Fernando Martz. They were influenced by American music and tried to create a sound that didn't already exist in Mexico. They went on to become pioneers of the so-called Avanzada Regia movement.

=== Releases ===
In 1997 Zurdok Movimento released their debut album, Antena, which produced the singles "Tropecé", "Si me hablas al revés", "Gallito Inglés", and "No Importa".

The band, by this point called only Zurdok, released their second album, Hombre Sintetizador, in 1999. It was produced by Peter Reardon and spawned the singles "Abre los ojos", "Si Me Advertí", "¿Cuántos pasos?", and "Luna". On this record, the band moved away from their debut's heavier, more distorted sound. Following the release, Martz left Zurdok, leaving Chetes as the band's sole vocalist.

Zurdok's third studio album, Maquillaje, came out in 2001, again produced by Reardon and recorded at Capital Studios in Los Angeles. The album was another sonic departure for the band, eschewing guitars entirely in favour of keyboards, synthesizers, and even a sitar, along with orchestral arrangements. The singles "Estatico", "Así Es", and "Para Siempre" were issued. Before the album's release, Hernández left the group. Zurdok subsequently toured with Jumbo.

=== Breakup and reunions ===
In 2002, Zurdok went on hiatus, as their contract with Universal Music was up. A year later, they announced that their split would be permanent.

In 2006, Fernando Martz and David Izquierdo organized a band reunion, and they performed at that year's Vive Latino festival. Zurdok reunited once more in 2014, touring Mexico and releasing several new songs as part of a compilation box set.

== Post-Zurdok ==
In 2005, Chetes and Maurizio Terracina formed the band Vaquero, which issued a self-titled album the same year. Chetes went on to have a solo career, releasing six studio albums as of 2026. Gustavo "Cátsup" Hernández joined the band Quiero Club.

== Band members ==
- Jorge "Fletch" Sáenz – drums
- David Izquierdo – guitar
- Maurizio Terracina – bass
- Chetes – vocals, guitar
- Gustavo "Cátsup" Hernández – guitar, keyboards
- Fernando Martz – vocals

== Discography ==
Studio albums

- Antena (1997)
- Hombre Sintetizador (1999)
- Maquillaje (2001)

Compilations

- Crazy Pack (2001)
- Lo Mejor de Zurdok (2007)
- 16 Éxitos de Oro (2012)
- Gran Salto 1997–2014 (2014)

Singles

- "Tropecé" (1997)
- "Si me hablas al revés" (1997)
- "Gallito Inglés" (1997)
- "Abre los ojos" (1999)
- "Si me adverti" (1999)
- "¿Cuántos pasos?" (1999)
- "Luna" (2001)
- "Estatico" (2001)
- "Así Es" (2001)
- "Para Siempre" (2004)
- "Azul Oscuro" (2014)
